= List of senators in the 36th Parliament of Canada =

This is a list of members of the Senate of Canada in the 36th Parliament of Canada.

The province of Quebec has 24 Senate divisions which are constitutionally mandated. In all other provinces, a Senate division is strictly an optional designation of the senator's own choosing, and has no real constitutional or legal standing. A senator who does not choose a special senate division is designated a senator for the province at large.

Names in bold indicate senators in the 26th Canadian Ministry.

== List of senators ==
=== Senators at the beginning of the 36th Parliament ===
Name	Party	Province (Division)	Date appointed	Appointed by	Left office	Reason
Willie Adams	Liberal	Northwest Territories, Nunavut^{[a]}	April 5, 1977	Trudeau	June 22, 2009	Retirement
Doris Margaret Anderson	Liberal	Prince Edward Island	September 21, 1995	Chrétien	July 5, 1997	Retirement
Raynell Andreychuk	Progressive Conservative	Saskatchewan	March 11, 1993	Mulroney	August 14, 2019	Retirement
W. David Angus	Progressive Conservative	Quebec	June 10, 1993	Mulroney	July 21, 2012	Retirement
Norman Atkins	Progressive Conservative	Ontario	June 30, 1986	Mulroney	June 27, 2009	Retirement
Jack Austin	Liberal	British Columbia	August 19, 1975	Trudeau	March 2, 2007	Retirement
Lise Bacon	Liberal	Quebec	September 15, 1994	Chrétien	August 25, 2009	Retirement
James Balfour	Progressive Conservative	Saskatchewan	September 13, 1979	Clark	December 12, 1999	Death
Gérald Beaudoin	Progressive Conservative	Quebec	September 26, 1988	Mulroney	April 15, 2004	Retirement
Eric Berntson	Progressive Conservative	Saskatchewan	September 27, 1990	Mulroney	February 27, 2001	Resignation
Roch Bolduc	Progressive Conservative	Quebec	September 26, 1988	Mulroney	September 10, 2003	Retirement
Lorne Bonnell	Liberal	Prince Edward Island	November 4, 1971	Trudeau	January 4, 1998	Retirement
Peter Bosa	Liberal	Ontario	April 5, 1977	Trudeau	December 10, 1998	Death
John G. Bryden	Liberal	New Brunswick	November 23, 1994	Chrétien	October 31, 2009	Resignation
John Buchanan	Progressive Conservative	Nova Scotia	September 12, 1990	Mulroney	April 22, 2006	Retirement
Pat Carney	Progressive Conservative	British Columbia	August 30, 1990	Mulroney	January 31, 2008	Resignation
Sharon Carstairs	Liberal	Manitoba	September 15, 1994	Chrétien	October 17, 2011	Resignation
Guy Charbonneau	Progressive Conservative	Quebec	September 27, 1979	Clark	June 21, 1997	Retirement
Ethel Cochrane	Progressive Conservative	Newfoundland and Labrador	November 17, 1986	Mulroney	September 23, 2012	Retirement
Michel Cogger	Progressive Conservative	Quebec	May 2, 1986	Mulroney	September 1, 2000	Resignation
Erminie Cohen	Progressive Conservative	New Brunswick	June 4, 1993	Mulroney	July 23, 2001	Retirement
Gerald Comeau	Progressive Conservative	Nova Scotia	August 30, 1990	Mulroney	November 30, 2013	Resignation
Anne Cools	Liberal	Ontario	January 13, 1984	Trudeau	August 12, 2018	Retirement
Eymard Corbin	Liberal	New Brunswick	July 9, 1984	Turner	August 2, 2009	Retirement
Pierre de Bané	Liberal	Quebec	June 29, 1984	Trudeau	August 2, 2013	Retirement
Mabel DeWare	Progressive Conservative	New Brunswick	September 23, 1990	Mulroney	August 9, 2001	Retirement
Consiglio Di Nino	Progressive Conservative	Ontario	August 30, 1990	Mulroney	June 30, 2012	Resignation
C. William Doody	Progressive Conservative	Newfoundland and Labrador	October 3, 1979	Clark	December 27, 2005	Death
Richard Doyle	Progressive Conservative	Ontario	March 19, 1985	Mulroney	March 10, 1998	Retirement
Trevor Eyton	Progressive Conservative	Ontario	September 23, 1990	Mulroney	July 12, 2009	Retirement
Joyce Fairbairn	Liberal	Alberta	June 29, 1984	Trudeau	January 18, 2013	Resignation
Jean Forest	Liberal	Alberta	May 16, 1996	Chrétien	August 28, 1998	Resignation
Michael Forrestall	Progressive Conservative	Nova Scotia	September 27, 1990	Mulroney	June 8, 2006	Death
Jean-Robert Gauthier	Liberal	Ontario	November 23, 1994	Chrétien	October 22, 2004	Retirement
Ron Ghitter	Progressive Conservative	Alberta	March 25, 1993	Mulroney	March 31, 2000	Resignation
Philippe Gigantès	Liberal	Quebec	January 13, 1984	Trudeau	August 16, 1998	Retirement
Jerry Grafstein	Liberal	Ontario	January 13, 1984	Trudeau	January 2, 2010	Retirement
**Alasdair Graham**	**Liberal**	**Nova Scotia**	**April 27, 1972**	**Trudeau**	**May 21, 2004**	**Retirement**
Normand Grimard	Progressive Conservative	Quebec	September 27, 1990	Mulroney	June 16, 2000	Retirement
Lenard Gustafson	Progressive Conservative	Saskatchewan	May 26, 1993	Mulroney	November 10, 2008	Retirement
Stanley Haidasz	Liberal	Ontario	March 23, 1978	Trudeau	March 4, 1998	Retirement
Dan Hays	Liberal	Alberta	June 29, 1984	Trudeau	June 30, 2007	Resignation
Jacques Hébert	Liberal	Quebec	April 20, 1983	Trudeau	June 21, 1998	Retirement
Céline Hervieux-Payette	Liberal	Quebec	March 21, 1995	Chrétien	April 22, 2016	Retirement
Duncan Jessiman	Progressive Conservative	Manitoba	May 26, 1993	Mulroney	June 5, 1998	Retirement
Janis Johnson	Progressive Conservative	Manitoba	September 27, 1990	Mulroney	September 27, 2016	Resignation
James Kelleher	Progressive Conservative	Ontario	September 23, 1990	Mulroney	October 2, 2005	Retirement
William McDonough Kelly	Progressive Conservative	Ontario	December 23, 1982	Trudeau	July 21, 2000	Retirement
Colin Kenny	Liberal	Ontario	June 29, 1984	Trudeau	February 2, 2018	Resignation
Wilbert Keon	Progressive Conservative	Ontario	September 27, 1990	Mulroney	May 17, 2010	Retirement
Noël Kinsella	Progressive Conservative	New Brunswick	September 12, 1990	Mulroney	November 27, 2014	Retirement
Michael J. L. Kirby	Liberal	Nova Scotia	January 13, 1984	Trudeau	October 31, 2006	Resignation
Leo Kolber	Liberal	Quebec	December 23, 1983	Trudeau	January 18, 2004	Retirement
Joseph P. Landry	Liberal	New Brunswick	February 26, 1996	Chrétien	June 19, 1997	Retirement
Thérèse Lavoie-Roux	Progressive Conservative	Quebec	September 27, 1990	Mulroney	March 12, 2001	Resignation
Edward M. Lawson	Independent	British Columbia	October 7, 1970	Trudeau	September 24, 2004	Retirement
Marjory LeBreton	Progressive Conservative	Ontario	June 18, 1993	Mulroney	July 4, 2015	Retirement
Philip Lewis	Liberal	Newfoundland and Labrador	March 23, 1978	Trudeau	November 28, 1999	Retirement
Rose-Marie Losier-Cool	Liberal	New Brunswick	March 21, 1995	Chrétien	June 18, 2012	Retirement
Paul Lucier	Liberal	Yukon	October 23, 1975	Trudeau	July 23, 1999	Death
John Lynch-Staunton	Progressive Conservative	Quebec	September 23, 1990	Mulroney	June 19, 2005	Retirement
Finlay MacDonald	Progressive Conservative	Nova Scotia	December 21, 1984	Mulroney	January 4, 1998	Retirement
John Michael Macdonald	Progressive Conservative	Nova Scotia	June 24, 1960	Diefenbaker	June 20, 1997	Death
Shirley Maheu	Liberal	Quebec	February 1, 1996	Chrétien	February 1, 2006	Death
Leonard Marchand	Liberal	British Columbia	June 29, 1984	Trudeau	March 1, 1998	Resignation
Michael Meighen	Progressive Conservative	Ontario	September 27, 1990	Mulroney	February 6, 2012	Resignation
Léonce Mercier	Liberal	Quebec	August 9, 1996	Chrétien	August 11, 2001	Retirement
Lorna Milne	Liberal	Ontario	September 21, 1995	Chrétien	December 13, 2009	Retirement
Gildas Molgat	Liberal	Manitoba	October 7, 1970	Trudeau	February 28, 2001	Death
Wilfred Moore	Liberal	Nova Scotia	September 26, 1996	Chrétien	January 14, 2017	Retirement
Lowell Murray	Progressive Conservative	Ontario	September 13, 1979	Clark	September 26, 2011	Retirement
Pierre Claude Nolin	Progressive Conservative	Quebec	June 18, 1993	Mulroney	April 23, 2015	Death
Donald Oliver	Progressive Conservative	Nova Scotia	September 7, 1990	Mulroney	November 16, 2013	Retirement
Gerry Ottenheimer	Progressive Conservative	Newfoundland and Labrador	December 30, 1987	Mulroney	January 18, 1998	Death
Landon Pearson	Liberal	Ontario	September 15, 1994	Chrétien	November 16, 2005	Retirement
Lucie Pépin	Liberal	Quebec	April 8, 1997	Chrétien	September 7, 2011	Retirement
Ray Perrault	Liberal	British Columbia	October 5, 1973	Trudeau	February 6, 2001	Retirement
William Petten	Liberal	Newfoundland and Labrador	April 8, 1968	Pearson	January 28, 1998	Retirement
Orville Howard Phillips	Progressive Conservative	Prince Edward Island	February 5, 1963	Diefenbaker	March 24, 1999	Resignation
Michael Pitfield	Independent	Ontario	December 22, 1982	Trudeau	June 1, 2010	Resignation
Marie Poulin	Liberal	Ontario	September 21, 1995	Chrétien	April 17, 2015	Resignation
Marcel Prud'homme	Independent	Quebec	May 26, 1993	Mulroney	November 30, 2009	Retirement
Jean-Claude Rivest	Progressive Conservative	Quebec	March 11, 1993	Mulroney	January 31, 2015	Resignation
Pietro Rizzuto	Liberal	Quebec	December 23, 1976	Trudeau	August 3, 1997	Death
Fernand Roberge	Progressive Conservative	Quebec	May 26, 1993	Mulroney	July 19, 2000	Resignation
Brenda Robertson	Progressive Conservative	New Brunswick	December 21, 1984	Mulroney	May 23, 2004	Retirement
Louis Robichaud	Liberal	New Brunswick	December 21, 1973	Trudeau	October 21, 2000	Retirement
Bill Rompkey	Liberal	Newfoundland and Labrador	September 21, 1995	Chrétien	May 13, 2011	Retirement
Eileen Rossiter	Progressive Conservative	Prince Edward Island	November 17, 1986	Mulroney	July 14, 2004	Retirement
Jean-Maurice Simard	Progressive Conservative	New Brunswick	June 26, 1985	Mulroney	June 16, 2001	Death
Herbert O. Sparrow	Liberal	Saskatchewan	February 9, 1968	Pearson	January 4, 2005	Retirement
Mira Spivak	Progressive Conservative	Manitoba	November 17, 1986	Mulroney	July 12, 2009	Retirement
Gerry St. Germain	Progressive Conservative	British Columbia	June 23, 1993	Mulroney	November 6, 2012	Retirement
Richard Stanbury	Liberal	Ontario	February 13, 1968	Pearson	May 2, 1998	Retirement
John Benjamin Stewart	Liberal	Nova Scotia	January 13, 1984	Trudeau	November 19, 1999	Retirement
Peter Stollery	Liberal	Ontario	July 2, 1981	Trudeau	November 29, 2010	Retirement
Terry Stratton	Progressive Conservative	Manitoba	March 25, 1993	Mulroney	March 16, 2013	Retirement
Nicholas Taylor	Liberal	Alberta	March 7, 1996	Chrétien	November 17, 2002	Retirement
Andy Thompson	Liberal	Ontario	April 6, 1967	Pearson	March 23, 1998	Resignation
David Tkachuk	Progressive Conservative	Saskatchewan	June 8, 1993	Mulroney	Incumbent	
Walter Patrick Twinn	Progressive Conservative	Alberta	September 27, 1990	Mulroney	October 30, 1997	Death
Charlie Watt	Liberal	Quebec	January 16, 1984	Trudeau	March 16, 2018	Resignation
Eugene Whelan	Liberal	Ontario	August 9, 1996	Chrétien	July 11, 1999	Retirement
Dalia Wood	Liberal	Quebec	March 26, 1979	Trudeau	January 31, 1999	Resignation

^{a} Willie Adams represented the Northwest Territories until the creation of Nunavut in 1999 when he became the Senator for Nunavut.

=== Senators appointed during the 36th Parliament ===
Name	Party	Province (Division)	Date appointed	Appointed by	Left office	Reason
Catherine Callbeck	Liberal	Prince Edward Island	September 22, 1997	Chrétien	July 25, 2014	Retirement
Marisa Ferretti Barth	Liberal	Quebec	September 22, 1997	Chrétien	April 28, 2006	Retirement
Fernand Robichaud	Liberal	New Brunswick	September 22, 1997	Chrétien	December 2, 2014	Retirement
Peggy Butts	Liberal	Nova Scotia	September 22, 1997	Chrétien	August 15, 1999	Retirement
Thelma Chalifoux	Liberal	Alberta	November 26, 1997	Chrétien	February 8, 2004	Retirement
Serge Joyal	Liberal	Quebec	November 26, 1997	Chrétien	Incumbent	
Ross Fitzpatrick	Liberal	British Columbia	March 6, 1998	Chrétien	February 4, 2008	Retirement
Archibald Johnstone	Liberal	Prince Edward Island	March 6, 1998	Chrétien	June 12, 1999	Retirement
Joan Cook	Liberal	Newfoundland and Labrador	March 6, 1998	Chrétien	October 6, 2009	Retirement
Marian Maloney	Liberal	Ontario	June 11, 1998	Chrétien	August 16, 1999	Retirement
Frank Mahovlich	Liberal	Ontario	June 11, 1998	Chrétien	January 10, 2013	Retirement
Calvin Ruck	Liberal	Nova Scotia	June 11, 1998	Chrétien	September 4, 2000	Retirement
Richard Kroft	Liberal	Manitoba	June 11, 1998	Chrétien	September 24, 2004	Resignation
Lois Miriam Wilson	Independent	Ontario	June 11, 1998	Chrétien	April 8, 2002	Retirement
Aurélien Gill	Liberal	Quebec	September 17, 1998	Chrétien	August 26, 2008	Retirement
Douglas Roche	Independent	Alberta	September 17, 1998	Chrétien	June 14, 2004	Retirement
Joan Fraser	Liberal	Quebec	September 17, 1998	Chrétien	February 2, 2018	Resignation
Vivienne Poy	Liberal	Ontario	September 17, 1998	Chrétien	September 17, 2012	Resignation
George Furey	Liberal	Newfoundland and Labrador	August 11, 1999	Chrétien	May 12, 2023	Retirement
Sheila Finestone	Liberal	Quebec	August 11, 1999	Chrétien	January 28, 2002	Retirement
Melvin Perry	Liberal	Prince Edward Island	August 11, 1999	Chrétien	August 23, 2000	Retirement
Ione Christensen	Liberal	Yukon	September 2, 1999	Chrétien	December 31, 2006	Resignation
Isobel Finnerty	Liberal	Ontario	September 2, 1999	Chrétien	July 15, 2005	Retirement
Nick Sibbeston	Liberal	Northwest Territories	September 2, 1999	Chrétien	November 21, 2017	Resignation
**Bernie Boudreau**	**Liberal**	**Nova Scotia**	**October 4, 1999**	**Chrétien**	**October 26, 2000**	**Resignation**
Jack Wiebe	Liberal	Saskatchewan	April 7, 2000	Chrétien	January 31, 2004	Resignation
Tommy Banks	Liberal	Alberta	April 7, 2000	Chrétien	December 17, 2011	Retirement
Jane Cordy	Liberal	Nova Scotia	June 9, 2000	Chrétien	Incumbent	
Raymond Squires	Liberal	Newfoundland and Labrador	June 9, 2000	Chrétien	February 6, 2001	Retirement
Raymond Setlakwe	Liberal	Quebec	June 20, 2000	Chrétien	July 3, 2003	Retirement
Betty Kennedy	Liberal	Ontario	June 20, 2000	Chrétien	January 4, 2001	Retirement

=== Left Senate during the 36th Parliament ===
Date	Name	Party	Representing	Details
June 19, 1997	Joseph P. Landry	Liberal	New Brunswick	Retirement
June 20, 1997	John Michael Macdonald	Progressive Conservative	Nova Scotia	Death
June 21, 1997	Guy Charbonneau	Progressive Conservative	Quebec	Retirement
July 5, 1997	Doris Margaret Anderson	Liberal	Prince Edward Island	Retirement
August 3, 1997	Pietro Rizzuto	Liberal	Quebec	Death
October 30, 1997	Walter Patrick Twinn	Progressive Conservative	Alberta	Death
January 4, 1998	Lorne Bonnell	Liberal	Prince Edward Island	Retirement
January 4, 1998	Finlay MacDonald	Progressive Conservative	Nova Scotia	Retirement
January 18, 1998	Gerry Ottenheimer	Progressive Conservative	Newfoundland and Labrador	Death
January 28, 1998	William Petten	Liberal	Newfoundland and Labrador	Retirement
March 1, 1998	Leonard Marchand	Liberal	British Columbia	Resignation
March 4, 1998	Stanley Haidasz	Liberal	Ontario	Retirement
March 10, 1998	Richard Doyle	Progressive Conservative	Ontario	Retirement
March 23, 1998	Andy Thompson	Independent	Ontario	Resignation
May 2, 1998	Richard Stanbury	Liberal	Ontario	Retirement
June 5, 1998	Duncan Jessiman	Progressive Conservative	Manitoba	Retirement
June 21, 1998	Jacques Hébert	Liberal	Quebec	Retirement
August 16, 1998	Philippe Gigantès	Liberal	Quebec	Retirement
August 28, 1998	Jean Forest	Liberal	Alberta	Resignation
December 10, 1998	Peter Bosa	Liberal	Ontario	Death
January 31, 1999	Dalia Wood	Liberal	Quebec	Resignation
March 24, 1999	Orville Howard Phillips	Progressive Conservative	Prince Edward Island	Resignation
June 12, 1999	Archibald Johnstone	Liberal	Prince Edward Island	Retirement
July 11, 1999	Eugene Whelan	Liberal	Ontario	Retirement
July 23, 1999	Paul Lucier	Liberal	Yukon	Death
August 15, 1999	Peggy Butts	Liberal	Nova Scotia	Retirement
August 16, 1999	Marian Maloney	Liberal	Ontario	Retirement
November 19, 1999	John Benjamin Stewart	Liberal	Nova Scotia	Retirement
November 28, 1999	Philip Lewis	Liberal	Newfoundland and Labrador	Retirement
December 12, 1999	James Balfour	Progressive Conservative	Saskatchewan	Death
March 31, 2000	Ron Ghitter	Progressive Conservative	Alberta	Resignation
June 16, 2000	Normand Grimard	Progressive Conservative	Quebec	Retirement
July 19, 2000	Fernand Roberge	Progressive Conservative	Quebec	Resignation
July 21, 2000	William McDonough Kelly	Progressive Conservative	Ontario	Retirement
August 23, 2000	Melvin Perry	Liberal	Prince Edward Island	Retirement
September 1, 2000	Michel Cogger	Progressive Conservative	Quebec	Resignation
September 4, 2000	Calvin Ruck	Liberal	Nova Scotia	Retirement
October 21, 2000	Louis Robichaud	Liberal	New Brunswick	Retirement
**October 26, 2000**	**Bernie Boudreau**	**Liberal**	**Nova Scotia**	**Resignation**

=== Changes in party affiliation during the 36th Parliament ===
Date	Name	Party (subsequent)	Party (previous)	Details
November 20, 1997	Andy Thompson	Independent	Liberal	Expelled from the Liberal caucus
June 30, 2000	Gerry St. Germain	Independent Conservative	Progressive Conservative	
October 18, 2000	Gerry St. Germain	Canadian Alliance	Independent Conservative	

== See also ==
- List of current Canadian senators
