= List of House members of the 36th Parliament of Canada =

This is a list of the members of the 36th Parliament of Canada, from September 22, 1997, through to dissolution on October 22, 2000.

== Members ==
Members of the House of Commons in the 36th parliament arranged by province.

Key:

- Party leaders are italicized.
- Cabinet ministers are in **boldface**.
- The prime minister is **both**.
- The speaker is indicated by "†".
- Parliamentary secretaries is indicated by "‡".

=== Alberta ===
Riding	Member	Political party	First elected / previously elected	No. of terms
Athabasca	David Chatters	Reform	1993	2nd term
Athabasca	David Chatters	Canadian Alliance (Note: On March 26, 2000, all members of the Reform Party of Canada switched to the new Canadian Alliance.)	1993	2nd term
Calgary Centre	Eric Lowther	Reform	1997	1st term
Calgary Centre	Eric Lowther	Canadian Alliance	1997	1st term
Calgary East	Deepak Obhrai	Reform	1997	1st term
Calgary East	Deepak Obhrai	Canadian Alliance	1997	1st term
Calgary Northeast	Art Hanger	Reform	1993	2nd term
Calgary Northeast	Art Hanger	Canadian Alliance	1993	2nd term
Calgary—Nose Hill	Diane Ablonczy	Reform	1993	2nd term
Calgary—Nose Hill	Diane Ablonczy	Canadian Alliance	1993	2nd term
Calgary Southeast	Jason Kenney	Reform	1997	1st term
Calgary Southeast	Jason Kenney	Canadian Alliance	1997	1st term
Calgary Southwest	Preston Manning	Reform	1993	2nd term
Calgary Southwest	Preston Manning	Canadian Alliance	1993	2nd term
Calgary West	Rob Anders	Reform	1997	1st term
Calgary West	Rob Anders	Canadian Alliance	1997	1st term
Crowfoot	Jack Ramsay	Reform	1993	2nd term
Crowfoot	Jack Ramsay	Canadian Alliance	1993	2nd term
Crowfoot	Jack Ramsay	Independent (Note: Jack Ramsay was expelled from the Canadian Alliance due to criminal charges and sat as Independent in 2000.)	1993	2nd term
Edmonton East	Peter Goldring	Reform	1997	1st term
Edmonton East	Peter Goldring	Canadian Alliance	1997	1st term
Edmonton North	Deborah Grey	Reform	1989	3rd term
Edmonton North	Deborah Grey	Canadian Alliance	1989	3rd term
Edmonton Southeast	**David Kilgour**	Liberal	1979 (Note: First elected as a Progressive Conservative)	6th term
Edmonton Southwest	Ian McClelland	Reform	1993	2nd term
Edmonton Southwest	Ian McClelland	Canadian Alliance	1993	2nd term
Edmonton West	**Anne McLellan**	Liberal	1993	2nd term
Edmonton—Strathcona	Rahim Jaffer	Reform	1997	1st term
Edmonton—Strathcona	Rahim Jaffer	Canadian Alliance	1997	1st term
Elk Island	Ken Epp	Reform	1993	2nd term
Elk Island	Ken Epp	Canadian Alliance	1993	2nd term
Lakeland	Leon Benoit	Reform	1993	2nd term
Lakeland	Leon Benoit	Canadian Alliance	1993	2nd term
Lethbridge	Rick Casson	Reform	1997	1st term
Lethbridge	Rick Casson	Canadian Alliance	1997	1st term
Macleod	Grant Hill	Reform	1993	2nd term
Macleod	Grant Hill	Canadian Alliance	1993	2nd term
Medicine Hat	Monte Solberg	Reform	1993	2nd term
Medicine Hat	Monte Solberg	Canadian Alliance	1993	2nd term
Peace River	Charlie Penson	Reform	1993	2nd term
Peace River	Charlie Penson	Canadian Alliance	1993	2nd term
Red Deer	Bob Mills	Reform	1993	2nd term
Red Deer	Bob Mills	Canadian Alliance	1993	2nd term
St. Albert	John G. Williams	Reform	1993	2nd term
St. Albert	John G. Williams	Canadian Alliance	1993	2nd term
Wetaskiwin	Dale Johnston	Reform	1993	2nd term
Wetaskiwin	Dale Johnston	Canadian Alliance	1993	2nd term
Wild Rose	Myron Thompson	Reform	1993	2nd term
Wild Rose	Myron Thompson	Canadian Alliance	1993	2nd term
Yellowhead	Cliff Breitkreuz	Reform	1993	2nd term
Yellowhead	Cliff Breitkreuz	Canadian Alliance	1993	2nd term

=== British Columbia ===
Riding	Member	Political party	First elected / previously elected	No. of terms
Burnaby—Douglas	Svend Robinson	New Democrat	1979	6th term
Cariboo—Chilcotin	Philip Mayfield	Reform	1993	2nd term
Cariboo—Chilcotin	Philip Mayfield	Canadian Alliance	1993	2nd term
Delta—South Richmond	John Cummins	Reform	1993	2nd term
Delta—South Richmond	John Cummins	Canadian Alliance	1993	2nd term
Dewdney—Alouette	Grant McNally	Reform	1997	1st term
Dewdney—Alouette	Grant McNally	Canadian Alliance	1997	1st term
Esquimalt—Juan de Fuca	Keith Martin	Reform	1993	2nd term
Esquimalt—Juan de Fuca	Keith Martin	Canadian Alliance	1993	2nd term
Fraser Valley	Chuck Strahl	Reform	1993	2nd term
Fraser Valley	Chuck Strahl	Canadian Alliance	1993	2nd term
Kamloops	Nelson Riis	New Democrat	1980	5th term
Kelowna	Werner Schmidt	Reform	1993	2nd term
Kelowna	Werner Schmidt	Canadian Alliance	1993	2nd term
Kootenay—Columbia	Jim Abbott	Reform	1993	2nd term
Kootenay—Columbia	Jim Abbott	Canadian Alliance	1993	2nd term
Langley—Abbotsford	Randy White	Reform	1993	2nd term
Langley—Abbotsford	Randy White	Canadian Alliance	1993	2nd term
Nanaimo—Alberni	Bill Gilmour	Reform	1993	2nd term
Nanaimo—Alberni	Bill Gilmour	Canadian Alliance	1993	2nd term
Nanaimo—Cowichan	Reed Elley	Reform	1997	1st term
Nanaimo—Cowichan	Reed Elley	Canadian Alliance	1997	1st term
New Westminster—Coquitlam—Burnaby	Paul Forseth	Reform	1993	2nd term
New Westminster—Coquitlam—Burnaby	Paul Forseth	Canadian Alliance	1993	2nd term
North Vancouver	Ted White	Reform	1993	2nd term
North Vancouver	Ted White	Canadian Alliance	1993	2nd term
Okanagan—Coquihalla	Jim Hart	Reform	1993	2nd term
Okanagan—Coquihalla	Jim Hart	Canadian Alliance	1993	2nd term
Okanagan—Coquihalla	Stockwell Day (2000) (Note: Jim Hart resigned his seat so that new Canadian Alliance leader Stockwell Day could run in a by-election to win a seat in the House.)	Canadian Alliance	2000	1st term
Okanagan—Shuswap	Darrel Stinson	Reform	1993	2nd term
Okanagan—Shuswap	Darrel Stinson	Canadian Alliance	1993	2nd term
Port Moody—Coquitlam	Sharon Hayes	Reform	1993	2nd term
Port Moody—Coquitlam	Lou Sekora (1998) (Note: Sharon Hayes resigned from Parliament to care for her ailing husband and was replaced by Lou Sekora after a 1998 byelection.)	Liberal	1998	1st term
Prince George—Bulkley Valley	Richard Harris	Reform	1993	2nd term
Prince George—Bulkley Valley	Richard Harris	Canadian Alliance	1993	2nd term
Prince George—Peace River	Jay Hill	Reform	1993	2nd term
Prince George—Peace River	Jay Hill	Canadian Alliance	1993	2nd term
Richmond	**Raymond Chan**	Liberal	1993	2nd term
Saanich—Gulf Islands	Gary Lunn	Reform	1997	1st term
Saanich—Gulf Islands	Gary Lunn	Canadian Alliance	1997	1st term
Skeena	Mike Scott	Reform	1993	2nd term
Skeena	Mike Scott	Canadian Alliance	1993	2nd term
South Surrey—White Rock—Langley	Val Meredith	Reform	1993	2nd term
South Surrey—White Rock—Langley	Val Meredith	Canadian Alliance	1993	2nd term
Surrey Central	Gurmant Grewal	Reform	1997	1st term
Surrey Central	Gurmant Grewal	Canadian Alliance	1997	1st term
Surrey North	Chuck Cadman	Reform	1997	1st term
Surrey North	Chuck Cadman	Canadian Alliance	1997	1st term
Vancouver Centre	**Hedy Fry**	Liberal	1993	2nd term
Vancouver East	Libby Davies	New Democrat	1997	1st term
Vancouver Island North	John Duncan	Reform	1993	2nd term
Vancouver Island North	John Duncan	Canadian Alliance	1993	2nd term
Vancouver Kingsway	Sophia Leung ‡	Liberal	1997	1st term
Vancouver Quadra	Ted McWhinney ‡	Liberal	1993	2nd term
Vancouver South—Burnaby	**Herb Dhaliwal**	Liberal	1993	2nd term
Victoria	**David Anderson**	Liberal	1968, (Note: Esquimalt—Saanich) 1993	3rd term*
West Kootenay—Okanagan	Jim Gouk	Reform	1993	2nd term
West Kootenay—Okanagan	Jim Gouk	Canadian Alliance	1993	2nd term
West Vancouver—Sunshine Coast	John Reynolds	Reform	1972, (Note: Burnaby—Richmond—Delta (First elected as a Progressive Conservative)) 1997	3rd term*
West Vancouver—Sunshine Coast	John Reynolds	Canadian Alliance	1972, 1997	3rd term*

=== Manitoba ===
Riding	Member	Political party	First elected / previously elected	No. of terms
Brandon—Souris	Rick Borotsik	Progressive Conservative	1997	1st term
Charleswood—St. James—Assiniboia	John Harvard ‡	Liberal	1988	3rd term
Churchill	Bev Desjarlais	New Democrat	1997	1st term
Dauphin—Swan River	Inky Mark	Reform	1997	1st term
Dauphin—Swan River	Inky Mark	Canadian Alliance	1997	1st term
Portage—Lisgar	Jake Hoeppner	Reform	1993	2nd term
Portage—Lisgar	Jake Hoeppner	Independent (Note: Jake Hoeppner was expelled from Reform Party and sat as an Independent in 1999.)	1993	2nd term
Provencher	David Iftody ‡	Liberal	1993	2nd term
Saint Boniface	**Ronald Duhamel**	Liberal	1988	3rd term
Selkirk—Interlake	Howard Hilstrom	Reform	1997	1st term
Selkirk—Interlake	Howard Hilstrom	Canadian Alliance	1997	1st term
Winnipeg Centre	Pat Martin	New Democrat	1997	1st term
Winnipeg North Centre	Judy Wasylycia-Leis	New Democrat	1997	1st term
Winnipeg North—St. Paul	Rey Pagtakhan ‡	Liberal	1988	3rd term
Winnipeg South	Reg Alcock ‡	Liberal	1993	2nd term
Winnipeg South Centre	**Lloyd Axworthy**	Liberal	1979	6th term
Winnipeg—Transcona	Bill Blaikie	New Democrat	1979	6th term

=== New Brunswick ===
Riding	Member	Political party	First elected / previously elected	No. of terms
Acadie—Bathurst	Yvon Godin	New Democrat	1997	1st term
Beauséjour—Petitcodiac	Angela Vautour	New Democrat	1997	1st term
Beauséjour—Petitcodiac	Angela Vautour	Progressive Conservative (Note: Angela Vautour left the New Democratic Party to join the Progressive Conservative Party in 1999.)	1997	1st term
Charlotte	Greg Thompson	Progressive Conservative	1988, 1997	2nd term*
Fredericton	**Andy Scott**	Liberal	1993	2nd term
Fundy—Royal	John Herron	Progressive Conservative	1997	1st term
Madawaska—Restigouche	Jean F. Dubé	Progressive Conservative	1997	1st term
Miramichi	Charles Hubbard	Liberal	1993	2nd term
Moncton	**Claudette Bradshaw** ‡	Liberal	1997	1st term
Saint John	Elsie Wayne	Progressive Conservative	1993	2nd term
Tobique—Mactaquac	Gilles Bernier	Progressive Conservative	1997	1st term

=== Newfoundland ===
Riding	Member	Political party	First elected / previously elected	No. of terms
Bonavista—Trinity—Conception	**Fred Mifflin**	Liberal	1988	3rd term
Burin—St. George's	Bill Matthews ‡	Progressive Conservative	1997	1st term
Burin—St. George's	Bill Matthews ‡	Liberal (Note: Bill Matthews left the Progressive Conservative Party to join the Liberal Party in 1999.)	1997	1st term
Gander—Grand-Falls	**George S. Baker**	Liberal	1974	7th term
Humber—St. Barbe—Baie Verte	Gerry Byrne ‡	Liberal	1996	2nd term
Labrador	Lawrence D. O'Brien ‡	Liberal	1996	2nd term
St. John's East	Norman Doyle	Progressive Conservative	1997	1st term
St. John's West	Charlie Power	Progressive Conservative	1997	1st term
St. John's West	Loyola Hearn (2000) (Note: Charlie Power retired from politics and was replaced by Loyola Hearn in a 2000 by-election.)	Progressive Conservative	2000	1st term

=== Nova Scotia ===
Riding	Member	Political party	First elected / previously elected	No. of terms
Bras d'Or	Michelle Dockrill	New Democrat	1997	1st term
Cumberland—Colchester	Bill Casey	Progressive Conservative	1988, 1997	2nd term*
Dartmouth	Wendy Lill	New Democrat	1997	1st term
Halifax	Alexa McDonough	New Democrat	1997	1st term
Halifax West	Gordon Earle	New Democrat	1997	1st term
Kings—Hants	Scott Brison	Progressive Conservative	1997	1st term
Kings—Hants	Joe Clark (2000) (Note: Scott Brison left parliament in 2000 to allow new Tory leader Joe Clark to run in a by-election to win a seat in the House.)	Progressive Conservative	1972, (Note: Rocky Mountain/Yellowhead (Alberta)) 2000	7th term*
Pictou—Antigonish—Guysborough	Peter MacKay	Progressive Conservative	1997	1st term
Sackville—Eastern Shore	Peter Stoffer	New Democrat	1997	1st term
South Shore	Gerald Keddy	Progressive Conservative	1997	1st term
Sydney—Victoria	Peter Mancini	New Democrat	1997	1st term
West Nova	Mark Muise	Progressive Conservative	1997	1st term

=== Ontario ===
Riding	Member	Political party	First elected / previously elected	No. of terms
Algoma—Manitoulin	Brent St. Denis ‡	Liberal	1993	2nd term
Barrie—Simcoe—Bradford	Aileen Carroll	Liberal	1997	1st term
Beaches—East York	**Maria Minna** ‡	Liberal	1993	2nd term
Bramalea—Gore—Malton	Gurbax Singh Malhi	Liberal	1993	2nd term
Brampton Centre	Sarkis Assadourian	Liberal	1993	2nd term
Brampton West—Mississauga	Colleen Beaumier	Liberal	1993	2nd term
Brant	**Jane Stewart**	Liberal	1993	2nd term
Broadview—Greenwood	Dennis Mills	Liberal	1988	3rd term
Bruce—Grey	Ovid Jackson ‡	Liberal	1993	2nd term
Burlington	Paddy Torsney ‡	Liberal	1993	2nd term
Cambridge	Janko Peric	Liberal	1993	2nd term
Carleton—Gloucester	Eugène Bellemare ‡	Liberal	1988	3rd term
Davenport	Charles Caccia	Liberal	1968	9th term
Don Valley East	**David Collenette**	Liberal	1974, 1980, 1993	4th term*
Don Valley West	John Godfrey ‡	Liberal	1993	2nd term
Dufferin—Peel—Wellington—Grey	Murray Calder	Liberal	1993	2nd term
Durham	Alex Shepherd ‡	Liberal	1993	2nd term
Eglinton—Lawrence	Joe Volpe ‡	Liberal	1988	3rd term
Elgin—Middlesex—London	Gar Knutson ‡	Liberal	1993	2nd term
Erie—Lincoln	John Maloney ‡	Liberal	1993	2nd term
Essex	Susan Whelan	Liberal	1993	2nd term
Etobicoke Centre	**Allan Rock**	Liberal	1993	2nd term
Etobicoke North	Roy Cullen ‡	Liberal	1996	2nd term
Etobicoke—Lakeshore	Jean Augustine	Liberal	1993	2nd term
Glengarry—Prescott—Russell	**Don Boudria**	Liberal	1984	4th term
Guelph—Wellington	Brenda Chamberlain ‡	Liberal	1993	2nd term
Haldimand—Norfolk—Brant	Bob Speller ‡	Liberal	1988	3rd term
Halton	Julian Reed ‡	Liberal	1993	2nd term
Hamilton East	**Sheila Copps**	Liberal	1984	4th term
Hamilton Mountain	Beth Phinney ‡	Liberal	1988	3rd term
Hamilton West	Stan Keyes ‡	Liberal	1988	3rd term
Hastings—Frontenac—Lennox and Addington	Larry McCormick ‡	Liberal	1993	2nd term
Huron—Bruce	Paul Steckle	Liberal	1993	2nd term
Kenora—Rainy River	**Bob Nault** ‡	Liberal	1988	3rd term
Kent—Essex	Jerry Pickard ‡	Liberal	1988	3rd term
Kingston and the Islands	Peter Milliken	Liberal	1988	3rd term
Kitchener Centre	Karen Redman ‡	Liberal	1997	1st term
Kitchener—Waterloo	Andrew Telegdi ‡	Liberal	1993	2nd term
Lambton—Kent—Middlesex	Rose-Marie Ur	Liberal	1993	2nd term
Lanark—Carleton	Ian Murray	Liberal	1993	2nd term
Leeds—Grenville	Joe Jordan ‡	Liberal	1997	1st term
London North Centre	Joe Fontana	Liberal	1988	3rd term
London West	Sue Barnes ‡	Liberal	1993	2nd term
London—Fanshawe	Pat O'Brien ‡	Liberal	1993	2nd term
Markham	Jim Jones	Progressive Conservative	1997	1st term
Markham	Jim Jones	Canadian Alliance (Note: Jim Jones left the Progressive Conservative Party to join the Canadian Alliance in 2000.)	1997	1st term
Mississauga Centre	Carolyn Parrish ‡	Liberal	1993	2nd term
Mississauga East	Albina Guarnieri	Liberal	1988	3rd term
Mississauga South	Paul Szabo ‡	Liberal	1993	2nd term
Mississauga West	Steve Mahoney	Liberal	1997	1st term
Nepean—Carleton	David Pratt	Liberal	1997	1st term
Niagara Centre	Gilbert Parent †	Liberal	1974, (Note: St. Catharines/Welland) 1988	6th term*
Niagara Falls	Gary Pillitteri	Liberal	1993	2nd term
Nickel Belt	Raymond Bonin	Liberal	1993	2nd term
Nipissing	Bob Wood ‡	Liberal	1988	3rd term
Northumberland	**Christine Stewart**	Liberal	1988	3rd term
Oak Ridges	Bryon Wilfert	Liberal	1997	1st term
Oakville	Bonnie Brown ‡	Liberal	1993	2nd term
Oshawa	Ivan Grose	Liberal	1993	2nd term
Ottawa Centre	Mac Harb	Liberal	1988	3rd term
Ottawa South	**John Manley**	Liberal	1988	3rd term
Ottawa West—Nepean	Marlene Catterall	Liberal	1988	3rd term
Ottawa—Vanier	Mauril Bélanger ‡	Liberal	1995	2nd term
Oxford	John Baird Finlay ‡	Liberal	1993	2nd term
Parkdale—High Park	Sarmite Bulte ‡	Liberal	1997	1st term
Parry Sound-Muskoka	**Andy Mitchell**	Liberal	1993	2nd term
Perth—Middlesex	John Richardson ‡	Liberal	1993	2nd term
Peterborough	Peter Adams ‡	Liberal	1993	2nd term
Pickering—Ajax—Uxbridge	Dan McTeague	Liberal	1993	2nd term
Prince Edward—Hastings	**Lyle Vanclief**	Liberal	1988	3rd term
Renfrew—Nipissing—Pembroke	Hec Clouthier ‡	Liberal	1997	1st term
Sarnia—Lambton	Roger Gallaway	Liberal	1993	2nd term
Sault Ste. Marie	Carmen Provenzano ‡	Liberal	1997	1st term
Scarborough Centre	John Cannis ‡	Liberal	1993	2nd term
Scarborough East	John McKay	Liberal	1997	1st term
Scarborough Southwest	Tom Wappel	Liberal	1988	3rd term
Scarborough—Agincourt	Jim Karygiannis	Liberal	1988	3rd term
Scarborough—Rouge River	Derek Lee ‡	Liberal	1988	3rd term
Simcoe North	Paul Devillers ‡	Liberal	1993	2nd term
Simcoe—Grey	Paul Bonwick	Liberal	1997	1st term
St. Catharines	Walt Lastewka ‡	Liberal	1993	2nd term
St. Paul's	Carolyn Bennett	Liberal	1997	1st term
Stoney Creek	Tony Valeri ‡	Liberal	1993	2nd term
Stormont—Dundas	Bob Kilger	Liberal	1988	3rd term
Sudbury	**Diane Marleau**	Liberal	1988	3rd term
Thornhill	**Elinor Caplan** ‡	Liberal	1997	1st term
Thunder Bay—Atikokan	Stan Dromisky ‡	Liberal	1993	2nd term
Thunder Bay—Nipigon	Joe Comuzzi	Liberal	1988	3rd term
Timiskaming—Cochrane	Benoît Serré ‡	Liberal	1993	2nd term
Timmins-James Bay	Réginald Bélair	Liberal	1988	3rd term
Toronto Centre—Rosedale	Bill Graham	Liberal	1993	2nd term
Trinity—Spadina	Tony Ianno ‡	Liberal	1993	2nd term
Vaughan—King—Aurora	Maurizio Bevilacqua	Liberal	1988	3rd term
Victoria—Haliburton	John O'Reilly	Liberal	1993	2nd term
Waterloo—Wellington	Lynn Myers ‡	Liberal	1997	1st term
Wentworth—Burlington	John Bryden	Liberal	1993	2nd term
Whitby—Ajax	Judi Longfield ‡	Liberal	1997	1st term
Willowdale	**Jim Peterson**	Liberal	1980, 1988	4th term*
Windsor West	**Herb Gray**	Liberal	1962	12th time
Windsor—St. Clair	Shaughnessy Cohen	Liberal	1993	2nd term
Windsor—St. Clair	Rick Limoges (1999) (Note: Shaughnessy Cohen died in office and was replaced by Richard Limoges after a 1999 byelection.)	Liberal	1999	1st term
York Centre	**Art Eggleton**	Liberal	1993	2nd term
York North	Karen Kraft Sloan ‡	Liberal	1993	2nd term
York South—Weston	John Nunziata	Independent	1984 (Note: First elected as a Liberal)	4th term
York West	**Sergio Marchi**	Liberal	1984	4th term
York West	Judy Sgro (1999) (Note: Sergio Marchi left politics to be appointed ambassador to the World Trade Organization; he was replaced by Judy Sgro after a 1999 byelection.)	Liberal	1999	1st term

=== Prince Edward Island ===
Riding	Member	Political party	First elected / previously elected	No. of terms
Cardigan	**Lawrence MacAulay**	Liberal	1988	3rd term
Egmont	Joe McGuire ‡	Liberal	1988	3rd term
Hillsborough	George Proud ‡	Liberal	1988	3rd term
Malpeque	Wayne Easter ‡	Liberal	1993	2nd term

=== Quebec ===
Riding	Member	Political party	First elected / previously elected	No. of terms
Abitibi	Guy St-Julien	Liberal	1984, 1997	3rd term*
Ahuntsic	Eleni Bakopanos ‡	Liberal	1993	2nd term
Anjou—Rivière-Des-Prairies	Yvon Charbonneau ‡	Liberal	1997	1st term
Argenteuil—Papineau	Maurice Dumas	Bloc Québécois	1993	2nd term
Beauce	Claude Drouin	Liberal	1997	1st term
Beauharnois—Salaberry	Daniel Turp	Bloc Québécois	1997	1st term
Beauport—Montmorency—Orléans	Michel Guimond	Bloc Québécois	1993	2nd term
Bellechasse—Etchemins—Montmagny—L'Islet	**Gilbert Normand**	Liberal	1997	1st term
Berthier—Montcalm	Michel Bellehumeur	Bloc Québécois	1993	2nd term
Bonaventure—Gaspé—Îles-de-la-Madeleine—Pabok	Yvan Bernier	Bloc Québécois	1993	2nd term
Bourassa	**Denis Coderre**	Liberal	1997	1st term
Brome—Missisquoi	Denis Paradis ‡	Liberal	1995	2nd term
Brossard—La Prairie	Jacques Saada ‡	Liberal	1997	1st term
Châteauguay	Maurice Godin	Bloc Québécois	1993	2nd term
Chambly	Ghislain Lebel	Bloc Québécois	1993	2nd term
Champlain	Réjean Lefebvre	Bloc Québécois	1993	2nd term
Champlain	Réjean Lefebvre	Independent (Note: Réjean Lefebvre left the Bloc Québécois due to drunken driving to sit as an Independent in 1999.)	1993	2nd term
Charlesbourg	Richard Marceau	Bloc Québécois	1997	1st term
Charlevoix	Gérard Asselin	Bloc Québécois	1993	2nd term
Chicoutimi	André Harvey	Progressive Conservative	1984, 1997	3rd term*
Chicoutimi	André Harvey	Independent	1984, 1997	3rd term*
Chicoutimi	André Harvey	Liberal (Note: André Harvey, David Price, and Diane St-Jacques left the Progressive Conservative Party to join the Liberal Party in 2000.)	1984, 1997	3rd term*
Compton—Stanstead	David Price	Progressive Conservative	1997	1st term
Compton—Stanstead	David Price	Liberal	1997	1st term
Drummond	Pauline Picard	Bloc Québécois	1993	2nd term
Frontenac—Mégantic	Jean-Guy Chrétien	Bloc Québécois	1993	2nd term
Gatineau	Mark Assad ‡	Liberal	1988	3rd term
Hochelaga—Maisonneuve	Réal Ménard	Bloc Québécois	1993	2nd term
Hull—Aylmer	**Marcel Massé**	Liberal	1993	2nd term
Hull—Aylmer	Marcel Proulx (1999) (Note: Marcel Massé retired from politics and was replaced by Marcel Proulx in a 1999 by-election.)	Liberal	1999	1st term
Joliette	René Laurin	Bloc Québécois	1993	2nd term
Jonquière	Jocelyne Girard-Bujold	Bloc Québécois	1997	1st term
Kamouraska—Rivière-du-Loup—Témiscouata—Les Basques	Paul Crête	Bloc Québécois	1993	2nd term
Lac-Saint-Jean	Stéphan Tremblay	Bloc Québécois	1996	2nd term
Lac-Saint-Louis	Clifford Lincoln	Liberal	1993	2nd term
LaSalle—Émard	**Paul Martin**	Liberal	1988	3rd term
Laurentides	Monique Guay	Bloc Québécois	1993	2nd term
Laurier—Sainte-Marie	Gilles Duceppe	Bloc Québécois	1990	3rd term
Laval Centre	Madeleine Dalphond-Guiral	Bloc Québécois	1993	2nd term
Laval East	Maud Debien	Bloc Québécois	1993	2nd term
Laval West	Raymonde Folco ‡	Liberal	1997	1st term
Lévis	Antoine Dubé	Bloc Québécois	1993	2nd term
Longueuil	Caroline St-Hilaire	Bloc Québécois	1997	1st term
Lotbinière	Odina Desrochers	Bloc Québécois	1997	1st term
Louis-Hébert	Hélène Alarie	Bloc Québécois	1997	1st term
Manicouagan	Ghislain Fournier	Bloc Québécois	1997	1st term
Matapédia—Matane	René Canuel	Bloc Québécois	1993	2nd term
Mercier	Francine Lalonde	Bloc Québécois	1993	2nd term
Mount Royal	Sheila Finestone	Liberal	1984	4th term
Mount Royal	Irwin Cotler (1999) (Note: Sheila Finestone was appointed to the Senate and was replaced by Irwin Cotler in a 1999 by-election.)	Liberal	1999	1st term
Notre-Dame-de-Grâce	Marlene Jennings	Liberal	1997	1st term
Outremont	**Martin Cauchon**	Liberal	1993	2nd term
Papineau—Saint-Denis	**Pierre Pettigrew**	Liberal	1996	2nd term
Pierrefonds—Dollard	Bernard Patry ‡	Liberal	1993	2nd term
Pontiac—Gatineau—Labelle	Robert Bertrand ‡	Liberal	1993	2nd term
Portneuf	Pierre de Savoye	Bloc Québécois	1993	2nd term
Quebec	Christiane Gagnon	Bloc Québécois	1993	2nd term
Quebec East	Jean-Paul Marchand	Bloc Québécois	1993	2nd term
Repentigny	Benoît Sauvageau	Bloc Québécois	1993	2nd term
Richelieu	Louis Plamondon	Bloc Québécois	1984	4th term
Richmond—Arthabaska	André Bachand	Progressive Conservative	1997	1st term
Rimouski—Mitis	Suzanne Tremblay	Bloc Québécois	1993	2nd term
Roberval	Michel Gauthier	Bloc Québécois	1993	2nd term
Rosemont	Bernard Bigras	Bloc Québécois	1997	1st term
Saint-Bruno—Saint-Hubert	Pierrette Venne	Bloc Québécois	1988	3rd term
Saint-Eustache—Sainte-Thérèse	Gilles Perron	Bloc Québécois	1997	1st term
Saint-Hyacinthe—Bagot	Yvan Loubier	Bloc Québécois	1993	2nd term
Saint-Jean	Claude Bachand	Bloc Québécois	1993	2nd term
Saint-Léonard—Saint-Michel	**Alfonso Gagliano**	Liberal	1984	4th term
Saint-Lambert	Yolande Thibeault	Liberal	1997	1st term
Saint-Laurent—Cartierville	**Stéphane Dion**	Liberal	1996	2nd term
Saint-Maurice	**Jean Chrétien**	Liberal	1963, 1990	11th time*
Shefford	Diane St-Jacques	Progressive Conservative	1997	1st term
Shefford	Diane St-Jacques	Liberal	1997	1st term
Sherbrooke	Jean Charest	Progressive Conservative	1984	4th term
Sherbrooke	Serge Cardin (1998)	Bloc Québécois (Note: Jean Charest left parliament to become leader of the Quebec Liberal Party and was replaced by Serge Cardin in a 1998 by-election.)	1998	1st term
Témiscamingue	Pierre Brien	Bloc Québécois	1993	2nd term
Terrebonne—Blainville	Paul Mercier	Bloc Québécois	1993	2nd term
Trois-Rivières	Yves Rocheleau	Bloc Québécois	1993	2nd term
Vaudreuil—Soulanges	Nick Discepola ‡	Liberal	1993	2nd term
Vercheres	Stéphane Bergeron	Bloc Québécois	1993	2nd term
Verdun—Saint-Henri	Raymond Lavigne	Liberal	1993	2nd term
Westmount—Ville-Marie	**Lucienne Robillard**	Liberal	1995	2nd term

=== Saskatchewan ===
Riding	Member	Political party	First elected / previously elected	No. of terms
Battlefords—Lloydminster	Gerry Ritz	Reform	1997	1st term
Battlefords—Lloydminster	Gerry Ritz	Canadian Alliance	1997	1st term
Blackstrap	Allan Kerpan	Reform	1993	2nd term
Blackstrap	Allan Kerpan	Canadian Alliance	1993	2nd term
Churchill River	Rick Laliberte	New Democrat	1997	1st term
Churchill River	Rick Laliberte	Liberal (Note: Rick Laliberte left the New Democratic Party to join the Liberal Party in 2000.)	1997	1st term
Cypress Hills—Grasslands	Lee Morrison	Reform	1993	2nd term
Cypress Hills—Grasslands	Lee Morrison	Canadian Alliance	1993	2nd term
Palliser	Dick Proctor	New Democrat	1997	1st term
Prince Albert	Derrek Konrad	Reform	1997	1st term
Prince Albert	Derrek Konrad	Canadian Alliance	1997	1st term
Qu'Appelle	Lorne Nystrom	New Democrat	1968, (Note: Yorkton—Melville) 1997	8th term*
Regina—Lumsden—Lake Centre	John Solomon	New Democrat	1993	2nd term
Saskatoon—Humboldt	Jim Pankiw	Reform	1997	1st term
Saskatoon—Humboldt	Jim Pankiw	Canadian Alliance	1997	1st term
Saskatoon—Rosetown—Biggar	Chris Axworthy	New Democrat	1988	3rd term
Saskatoon—Rosetown—Biggar	Dennis Gruending (1999) (Note: Chris Axworthy left parliament to join the provincial cabinet and was replaced by Dennis Gruending in a 1999 byelection.)	New Democrat	1999	1st term
Wanuskewin	Maurice Vellacott	Reform	1997	1st term
Wanuskewin	Maurice Vellacott	Canadian Alliance	1997	1st term
Souris—Moose Mountain	Roy Bailey	Reform	1997	1st term
Souris—Moose Mountain	Roy Bailey	Canadian Alliance	1997	1st term
Wascana	**Ralph Goodale**	Liberal	1974, (Note: Assiniboia) 1993	3rd term*
Yorkton—Melville	Garry Breitkreuz	Reform	1993	2nd term
Yorkton—Melville	Garry Breitkreuz	Canadian Alliance	1993	2nd term

=== Territories ===
Riding	Member	Political party	First elected / previously elected	No. of terms
Western Arctic	**Ethel Blondin-Andrew**	Liberal	1988	3rd term
Nunavut	Nancy Karetak-Lindell	Liberal	1997	1st term
Yukon	Louise Hardy	New Democrat	1997	1st term
