= 36th Canadian Parliament =

1997–2000 legislative term

- Majority parliament
- Sep. 22, 1997 – Oct. 22, 2000

Parliament leaders
- Prime minister: Rt. Hon. Jean Chrétien; Nov. 4, 1993 – Dec. 12, 2003
- Cabinet: 26th Canadian Ministry
- Leader of the Opposition: Hon. Preston Manning; 1997 – March 26, 2000
- Hon. Deborah Grey; March 27, 2000 – September 10, 2000
- Hon. Stockwell Day; September 11, 2000 – December 11, 2001

Party caucuses
- Government: Liberal Party
- Opposition: Reform Party*
- Senate Opp.: Progressive Conservative Party
- Recognized: Bloc Québécois
- New Democratic Party
- * Changed its name to Canadian Alliance partway through the Parliament.

House of Commons
- Seating arrangements of the House of Commons
- Speaker of the Commons: Hon. Gilbert Parent; Jan. 17, 1994 – Jan. 28, 2001
- Government House leader: Hon. Don Boudria; Jun. 11, 1997 – Jan. 14, 2002
- Opposition House leader: Hon. Randy White; Jun. 20, 1997 – Jan. 30, 2000
- Hon. Chuck Strahl; Feb. 1, 2000 – Apr. 24, 2001
- Members: 301 MP seats List of members

Senate
- Seating arrangements of the Senate
- Speaker of the Senate: Hon. Gildas Molgat; Nov. 22, 1994 – Jan. 25, 2001
- Government Senate leader: Hon. Alasdair Graham; June 11, 1997 – October 3, 1999
- Hon. Bernie Boudreau; October 4, 1999 – October 26, 2000
- Opposition Senate leader: Hon. John Lynch-Staunton; Dec. 15, 1993 – Sep. 30, 2004
- Senators: 104 senator seats List of senators

Sovereign
- Monarch: HM Elizabeth II; Feb. 6, 1952 – Sep. 8, 2022
- Governor general: HE Rt. Hon. Roméo LeBlanc; Feb. 8, 1995 – Oct. 7, 1999
- HE Rt. Hon. Adrienne Clarkson; Oct. 7, 1999 – Sep. 27, 2005

Sessions
- 1st session September 22, 1997 – September 18, 1999
- 2nd session October 12, 1999 – October 22, 2000
← 35th	→ 37th

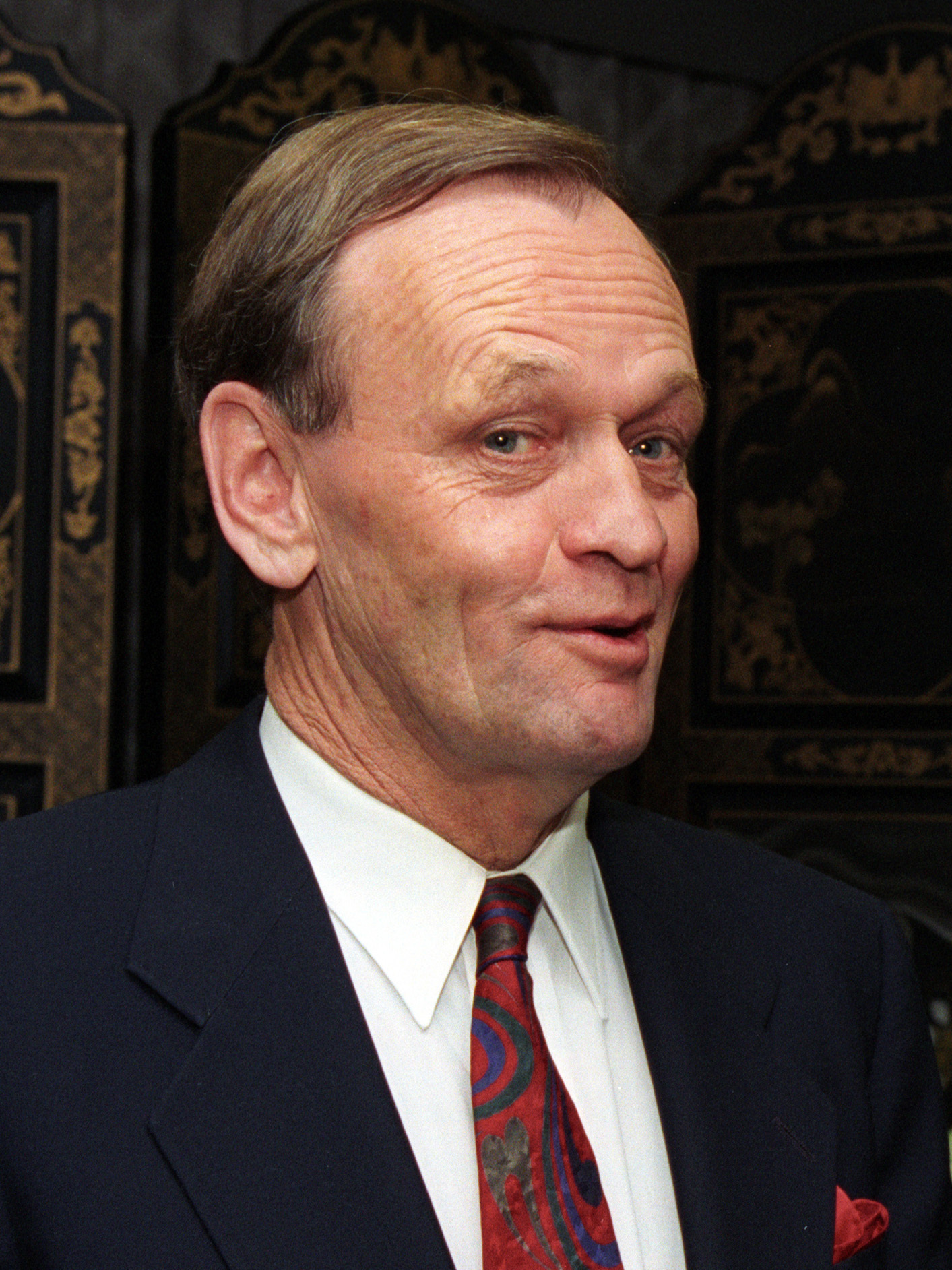
Jean Chrétien was Prime Minister during the 36th Canadian Parliament.

The 36th Canadian Parliament was in session from September 22, 1997, until October 22, 2000. The membership was set by the 1997 federal election on June 2, 1997, and it changed only somewhat due to resignations and by-elections until it was dissolved prior to the 2000 election.

It was controlled by a Liberal Party majority under Prime Minister Jean Chrétien and the 26th Canadian Ministry. The Official Opposition was first the Reform Party, led by Preston Manning, and then its successor party, the Canadian Alliance led by interim leader Deborah Grey.

The Speaker was Gilbert Parent. See also list of Canadian electoral districts 1996-2003 for a list of the ridings in this parliament.

For the first time in Canadian history, five different parties held official party status. Although five major parties ran for the 35th Parliament, the Progressive Conservative Party of Canada and the New Democratic Party both failed to win official party status in that parliament.

There were two sessions of the 36th Parliament:

Session	Start	End
1st	September 22, 1997	September 18, 1999
2nd	October 12, 1999	October 22, 2000

== Party standings ==
The party standings as of the election and as of dissolution were as follows:

Affiliation	House members		Senate members	
Affiliation	1997 election results	At dissolution	On election day 1997	At dissolution
Liberal	155	161	51	56
Reform	60	—N/a	0	—N/a
Bloc Québécois	44	44	0	0
New Democratic	21	19	0	0
Progressive Conservative	20	15	50	35
Independent	1	4	3	5
Alliance	—N/a	58	—N/a	1
Total members	301	301	104	97
Vacant	0	0	0	8
Total seats	301		104	105

== Ministry ==
The 26th Canadian Ministry was formed at the beginning of the 35th Canadian Parliament and lasted through the 36th Canadian Parliament and the majority of the 37th Canadian Parliament.

== Officeholders ==
=== Head of State ===
Office	Photo	Name	Assumed office	Left office
Sovereign		Elizabeth II	February 6, 1952	September 8, 2022
Governor General		Roméo LeBlanc	February 8, 1995	October 7, 1999
Governor General		Adrienne Clarkson	October 7, 1999	September 27, 2005

=== Party leadership ===
Party	Photo	Name	Assumed Office	Left Office
Liberal		Jean Chrétien	June 23, 1990	November 14, 2003
Reform		Preston Manning	November 1, 1987	March 25, 2000
Alliance		Deborah Grey (interim)	March 27, 2000	July 8, 2000
Alliance		Stockwell Day	July 8, 2000	December 11, 2001
Bloc Québécois		Gilles Duceppe	March 15, 1997	May 2, 2011
New Democratic		Alexa McDonough	October 14, 1995	January 25, 2003
Progressive Conservative		Jean Charest	December 14, 1993	April 2, 1998
Progressive Conservative		Elsie Wayne (interim)	April 2, 1998	November 14, 1998
Progressive Conservative		Joe Clark	November 14, 1998	May 31, 2003

==== Government leadership (Liberal) ====
Office	Photo	Officer	Riding	Assumed Office	Left Office
Prime Minister		Jean_Chrétien	Saint-Maurice	November 4, 1993	December 12, 2003
House Leader		Don Boudria	Glengarry–Prescott–Russell	June 11, 1997	January 14, 2002
Whip		Bob Kilger	Stormont—Dundas	1996	2001

== By-elections ==
By-election	Date	Incumbent	Party	Winner	Party	Cause	Retained
Okanagan—Coquihalla	September 11, 2000	Jim Hart	Canadian Alliance	Stockwell Day	Canadian Alliance	Resignation to provide a seat for Day	Yes
Kings—Hants	September 11, 2000	Scott Brison	Progressive Conservative	Joe Clark	Progressive Conservative	Resignation to provide a seat for Clark	Yes
St. John's West	May 15, 2000	Charlie Power	Progressive Conservative	Loyola Hearn	Progressive Conservative	Resignation	Yes
York West	November 15, 1999	Sergio Marchi	Liberal	Judy Sgro	Liberal	Resignation	Yes
Hull—Aylmer	November 15, 1999	Marcel Massé	Liberal	Marcel Proulx	Liberal	Resignation	Yes
Mount Royal	November 15, 1999	Sheila Finestone	Liberal	Irwin Cotler	Liberal	Resignation	Yes
Saskatoon—Rosetown—Biggar	November 15, 1999	Chris Axworthy	New Democratic	Dennis Gruending	New Democratic	Resignation	Yes
Windsor—St. Clair	April 12, 1999	Shaughnessy Cohen	Liberal	Rick Limoges	Liberal	Death (cerebral hemorrhage)	Yes
Sherbrooke	September 14, 1998	Jean Charest	Progressive Conservative	Serge Cardin	Bloc Québécois	Resignation to accept leadership of the Liberal Party of Quebec and enter provincial politics	No
Port Moody—Coquitlam	March 30, 1998	Sharon Hayes	Reform	Lou Sekora	Liberal	Resignation	No
