= 35th Canadian Parliament =

1994-97 seating of the national legislature of the North American country

- Majority parliament
- Jan. 17, 1994 – Apr. 27, 1997

Parliament leaders
- Prime minister: Rt. Hon. Jean Chrétien; Nov. 4, 1993 – Dec. 12, 2003
- Cabinet: 26th Canadian Ministry
- Leader of the Opposition: Hon. Lucien Bouchard; October 25, 1993 – January 14, 1996
- Hon. Gilles Duceppe (1st time); January 15, 1996 – February 16, 1996
- Hon. Michel Gauthier; February 17, 1996 – March 14, 1997
- Hon. Gilles Duceppe (2nd time); March 15, 1997 – June 23, 1997

Party caucuses
- Government: Liberal Party
- Opposition: Bloc Québécois
- Senate Opp.: Progressive Conservative Party*
- Recognized: Reform Party
- Unrecognized: New Democratic Party
- * Party only held official party status in the Senate.

House of Commons
- Seating arrangements of the House of Commons
- Speaker of the Commons: Hon. Gilbert Parent; January 17, 1994 – January 28, 2001
- Government House leader: Hon. Herb Gray; November 4, 1993 – April 27, 1997
- Opposition House leader: Hon. Michel Gauthier; November 10, 1993 – February 17, 1996
- Hon. Gilles Duceppe; February 18, 1996 – March 16, 1997
- Hon. Suzanne Tremblay; March 17, 1997 – April 25, 1997
- Members: 295 MP seats List of members

Senate
- Seating arrangements of the Senate
- Speaker of the Senate: Hon. Roméo LeBlanc; December 7, 1993 – November 21, 1994
- Hon. Gildas Molgat; November 22, 1994 – January 25, 2001
- Government Senate leader: Hon. Joyce Fairbairn; November 4, 1993 – June 10, 1997
- Opposition Senate leader: Hon. John Lynch-Staunton; December 15, 1993 – September 30, 2004
- Senators: 104 senator seats List of senators

Sovereign
- Monarch: Elizabeth II; 6 February 1952 – 8 September 2022
- Governor general: Ray Hnatyshyn; 29 January 1990 – 8 February 1995
- Roméo LeBlanc; 8 February 1995 – 7 October 1999

Sessions
- 1st session January 14, 1994 – February 2, 1996
- 2nd session February 27, 1996 – April 27, 1997
← 34th	→ 36th

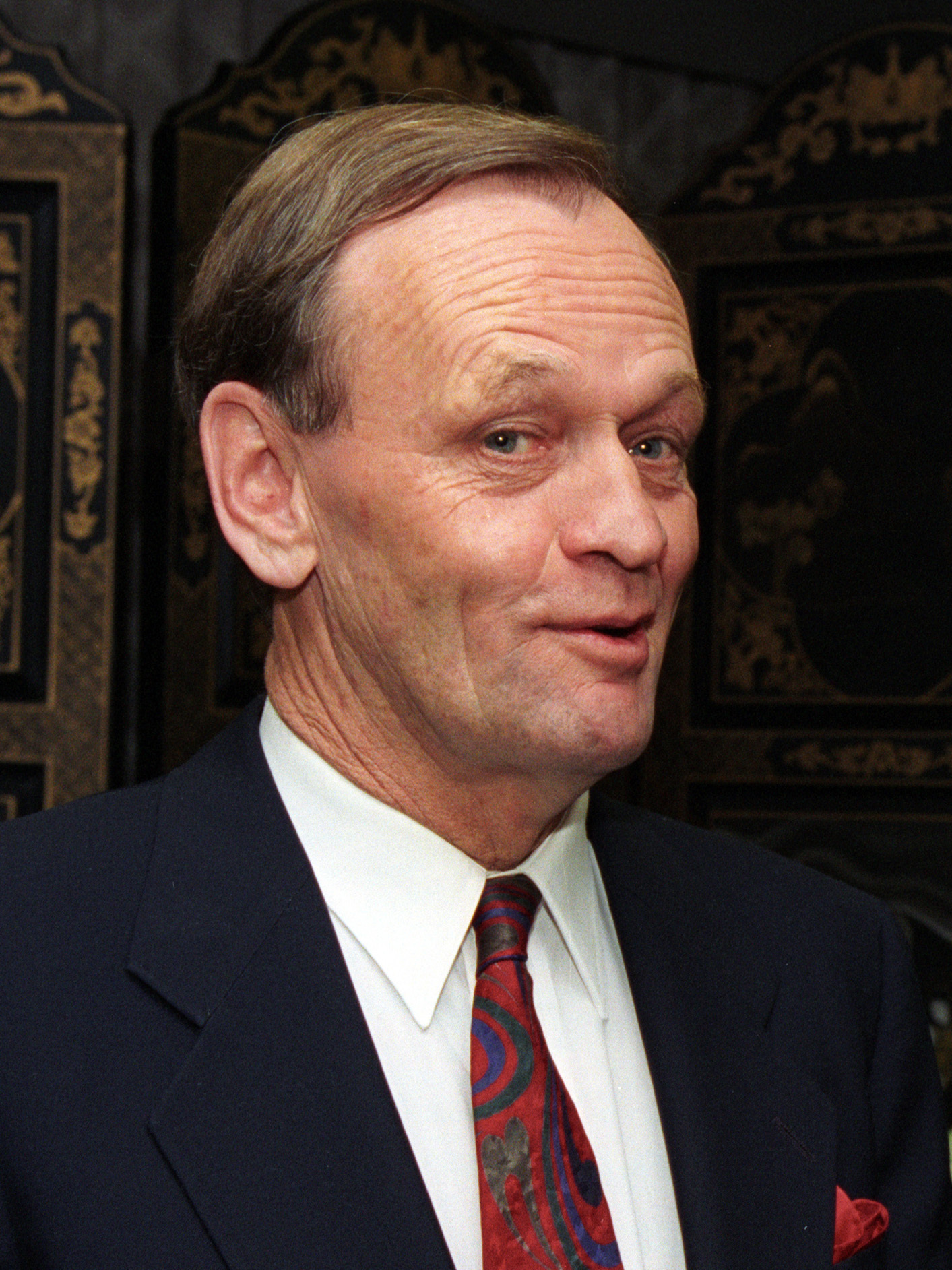
Jean Chrétien was Prime Minister during the 35th Canadian Parliament.

The 35th Canadian Parliament was in session from January 17, 1994, until April 27, 1997. The membership was set by the 1993 federal election on October 25, 1993, and it changed only somewhat due to resignations and by-elections until it was dissolved prior to the 1997 election.

There were two sessions of the 35th Parliament:

Session	Start	End
1st	January 17, 1994	February 2, 1996
2nd	February 27, 1996	April 27, 1997

== Overview ==
It was controlled by a Liberal Party majority under Prime Minister Jean Chrétien and the 26th Canadian Ministry. The Official Opposition was the Bloc Québécois, led first by Lucien Bouchard, then by Michel Gauthier, and finally by Gilles Duceppe.

== Party standings ==
The party standings as of the election and as of dissolution were as follows:

Affiliation	House members		Senate members	
Affiliation	1993 election results	At dissolution	On election day 1993	At dissolution
Liberal	177	174	41	51
Bloc Québécois	54	50	0	0
Reform	52	50	0	0
New Democratic	9	9	0	0
Progressive Conservative	2	3	58	50
Independent	1	5	5	3
Total members	295	291	104	104
Vacant	0	4	0	0
Total seats	295		104	

== Ministry ==
The 26th Canadian Ministry was formed at the beginning of the 35th Canadian Parliament and lasted through the 36th Canadian Parliament and the majority of the 37th Canadian Parliament.

== Officeholders ==
=== Head of State ===
Office	Photo	Name	Assumed office	Left office
Sovereign		Elizabeth II	February 6, 1952	September 8, 2022
Governor General		Ray Hnatyshyn	January 29, 1990	February 8, 1995
Governor General		Roméo LeBlanc	February 8, 1995	October 7, 1999

=== Party leadership ===
Party	Photo	Name	Assumed Office	Left Office
Liberal		Jean Chrétien	June 23, 1990	November 14, 2003
Bloc Québécois		Lucien Bouchard	July 25, 1990	January 16, 1996
Bloc Québécois		Gilles Duceppe	January 16, 1996	February 17, 1996
Bloc Québécois		Michel Gauthier	February 17, 1996	March 15, 1997
Bloc Québécois		Gilles Duceppe	March 15, 1997	May 2, 2011
Reform		Preston Manning	November 1, 1987	March 25, 2000
New Democratic		Audrey McLaughlin	December 5, 1989	October 14, 1995
New Democratic		Alexa McDonough	October 14, 1995	January 25, 2003
Progressive Conservative		Kim Campbell	June 25, 1993	December 14, 1993
Progressive Conservative		Jean Charest	December 14, 1993	April 2, 1998

==== Government leadership (Liberal) ====
Office	Photo	Officer	Riding	Assumed Office	Left Office
Prime Minister		Jean_Chrétien	Saint-Maurice	November 4, 1993	December 12, 2003
House Leader		Herb Gray	Windsor West	November 4, 1993	June 11, 1997
Whip		Alfonso Gagliano	Saint-Léonard—Saint-Michel	1993	1994
Whip		Don Boudria	Glengarry–Prescott–Russell	1994	1996
Whip		Bob Kilger	Stormont—Dundas	1996	2001

== Parliamentarians ==
=== House of Commons ===
Members of the House of Commons in the 35th parliament arranged by province.

Key:

- Party leaders are italicized.
- Parliamentary secretaries is indicated by "‡".
- Cabinet ministers are in **boldface**.
- The Prime Minister is **both**.
- The Speaker is indicated by "(†)".

==== Alberta ====
Riding	Member	Political party	First elected / previously elected	No. of terms
Athabasca	David Chatters	Reform	1993	1st term
Beaver River	Deborah Grey	Reform	1989	2nd term
Calgary Centre	Jim Silye	Reform	1993	1st term
Calgary North	Diane Ablonczy	Reform	1993	1st term
Calgary Northeast	Art Hanger	Reform	1993	1st term
Calgary Southeast	Jan Brown	Reform	1993	1st term
Calgary Southeast	Jan Brown	Independent*	1993	1st term
Calgary Southwest	Preston Manning	Reform	1993	1st term
Calgary West	Stephen Harper	Reform	1993	1st term
Crowfoot	Jack Ramsay	Reform	1993	1st term
Edmonton East	Judy Bethel	Liberal	1993	1st term
Edmonton North	John Loney	Liberal	1963, (Note: Bruce (Ontario) (First elected as a Progressive Conservative)) 1993	3rd term*
Edmonton Northwest	**Anne McLellan**	Liberal	1993	1st term
Edmonton Southeast	David Kilgour	Liberal	1979 (Note: First elected as a Progressive Conservative)	5th term
Edmonton Southwest	Ian McClelland	Reform	1993	1st term
Edmonton—Strathcona	Hugh Hanrahan	Reform	1993	1st term
Elk Island	Ken Epp	Reform	1993	1st term
Lethbridge	Ray Speaker	Reform	1993	1st term
Macleod	Grant Hill	Reform	1993	1st term
Medicine Hat	Monte Solberg	Reform	1993	1st term
Peace River	Charlie Penson	Reform	1993	1st term
Red Deer	Bob Mills	Reform	1993	1st term
St. Albert	John G. Williams	Reform	1993	1st term
Vegreville	Leon Benoit	Reform	1993	1st term
Wetaskiwin	Dale Johnston	Reform	1993	1st term
Wild Rose	Myron Thompson	Reform	1993	1st term
Yellowhead	Cliff Breitkreuz	Reform	1993	1st term

* Jan Brown was suspended from the Reform Party, and then quit the party to sit as an Independent Reform member.

==== British Columbia ====
Riding	Member	Political party	First elected / previously elected	No. of terms
Burnaby—Kingsway	Svend Robinson	New Democrat	1979	5th term
Capilano—Howe Sound	Herb Grubel	Reform	1993	1st term
Cariboo—Chilcotin	Philip Mayfield	Reform	1993	1st term
Comox—Alberni	Bill Gilmour	Reform	1993	1st term
Delta	John Cummins	Reform	1993	1st term
Esquimalt—Juan de Fuca	Keith Martin	Reform	1993	1st term
Fraser Valley East	Chuck Strahl	Reform	1993	1st term
Fraser Valley West	Randy White	Reform	1993	1st term
Kamloops	Nelson Riis	New Democrat	1980	4th term
Kootenay East	Jim Abbott	Reform	1993	1st term
Kootenay West—Revelstoke	Jim Gouk	Reform	1993	1st term
Mission—Coquitlam	Daphne Jennings	Reform	1993	1st term
Nanaimo—Cowichan	Bob Ringma	Reform	1993	1st term
New Westminster—Burnaby	Paul Forseth	Reform	1993	1st term
North Island—Powell River	John Duncan	Reform	1993	1st term
North Vancouver	Ted White	Reform	1993	1st term
Okanagan Centre	Werner Schmidt	Reform	1993	1st term
Okanagan—Shuswap	Darrel Stinson	Reform	1993	1st term
Okanagan—Similkameen—Merritt	Jim Hart	Reform	1993	1st term
Port Moody—Coquitlam	Sharon Hayes	Reform	1993	1st term
Prince George—Bulkley Valley	Richard Harris	Reform	1993	1st term
Prince George—Peace River	Jay Hill	Reform	1993	1st term
Richmond	**Raymond Chan**	Liberal	1993	1st term
Saanich—Gulf Islands	Jack Frazer	Reform	1993	1st term
Skeena	Mike Scott	Reform	1993	1st term
Surrey North	Margaret Bridgman	Reform	1993	1st term
Surrey—White Rock—South Langley	Val Meredith	Reform	1993	1st term
Vancouver Centre	**Hedy Fry** ‡	Liberal	1993	1st term
Vancouver East	Anna Terrana	Liberal	1993	1st term
Vancouver Quadra	Ted McWhinney ‡	Liberal	1993	1st term
Vancouver South	Herb Dhaliwal ‡	Liberal	1993	1st term
Victoria	**David Anderson**	Liberal	1968, (Note: Esquimalt—Saanich) 1993	2nd term*

==== Manitoba ====
Riding	Member	Political party	First elected / previously elected	No. of terms
Brandon—Souris	Glen McKinnon	Liberal	1993	1st term
Churchill	Elijah Harper	Liberal	1993	1st term
Dauphin—Swan River	Marlene Cowling ‡	Liberal	1993	1st term
Lisgar—Marquette	Jake Hoeppner	Reform	1993	1st term
Portage—Interlake	**Jon Gerrard**	Liberal	1993	1st term
Provencher	David Iftody	Liberal	1993	1st term
Selkirk—Red River	Ron Fewchuk	Liberal	1993	1st term
Saint Boniface	Ron Duhamel ‡	Liberal	1988	2nd term
Winnipeg North Centre	David Walker ‡	Liberal	1988	2nd term
Winnipeg North	Rey Pagtakhan ‡	Liberal	1988	2nd term
Winnipeg South	Reg Alcock	Liberal	1993	1st term
Winnipeg St. James	John Harvard ‡	Liberal	1988	2nd term
Winnipeg South Centre	**Lloyd Axworthy**	Liberal	1979	5th term
Winnipeg—Transcona	Bill Blaikie	New Democrat	1979	5th term

==== New Brunswick ====
Riding	Member	Political party	First elected / previously elected	No. of terms
Acadie—Bathurst	**Doug Young**	Liberal	1988	2nd term
Beauséjour	**Fernand Robichaud**	Liberal	1984, 1993	3rd term*
Carleton—Charlotte	Harold Culbert	Liberal	1993	1st term
Fredericton—York—Sunbury	Andy Scott	Liberal	1993	1st term
Fundy—Royal	Paul Zed ‡	Liberal	1993	1st term
Madawaska—Victoria	Pierrette Ringuette	Liberal	1993	1st term
Miramichi	Charles Hubbard	Liberal	1993	1st term
Moncton	George Rideout ‡	Liberal	1988	2nd term
Restigouche—Chaleur	Guy Arseneault ‡	Liberal	1988	2nd term
Saint John	Elsie Wayne	Progressive Conservative	1993	1st term

==== Newfoundland ====
Riding	Member	Political party	First elected / previously elected	No. of terms
Bonavista—Trinity—Conception	**Fred Mifflin** ‡	Liberal	1988	2nd term
Burin—St. George's	Roger Simmons	Liberal	1979, 1988	4th term*
Gander—Grand-Falls	George Baker	Liberal	1974	6th term
Humber—St. Barbe—Baie Verte	**Brian Tobin**	Liberal	1980	4th term
Humber—St. Barbe—Baie Verte	Gerry Byrne (1996)*	Liberal	1996	1st term
Labrador	Bill Rompkey	Liberal	1972	7th term
Labrador	Lawrence D. O'Brien (1996)**	Liberal	1996	1st term
St. John's East	Bonnie Hickey	Liberal	1993	1st term
St. John's West	Jean Payne	Liberal	1993	1st term

* Brian Tobin left parliament in 1996 to become premier of Newfoundland; Gerry Byrne was elected to replace him in a by-election.
** Bill Rompkey was appointed to the Senate in September 1995; Lawrence D. O'Brien was elected to replace him in a by-election in 1996.

==== Nova Scotia ====
Riding	Member	Political party	First elected / previously elected	No. of terms
Annapolis Valley—Hants	John Murphy	Liberal	1993	1st term
Cape Breton Highlands—Canso	Francis LeBlanc ‡	Liberal	1988	2nd term
Cape Breton—East Richmond	**David Dingwall**	Liberal	1980	4th term
Cape Breton—The Sydneys	Russell MacLellan ‡	Liberal	1979	5th term
Central Nova	Roseanne Skoke	Liberal	1993	1st term
Cumberland—Colchester	Dianne Brushett	Liberal	1993	1st term
Dartmouth	Ron MacDonald ‡	Liberal	1988	2nd term
Halifax	Mary Clancy ‡	Liberal	1988	2nd term
Halifax West	Geoff Regan	Liberal	1993	1st term
South Shore	Derek Wells	Liberal	1993	1st term
South West Nova	Harry Verran	Liberal	1993	1st term

==== Ontario ====
Riding	Member	Political party	First elected / previously elected	No. of terms
Algoma—Manitoulin	Brent St. Denis	Liberal	1993	1st term
Beaches—Woodbine	Maria Minna ‡	Liberal	1993	1st term
Bramalea—Gore—Malton	Gurbax Malhi	Liberal	1993	1st term
Brampton	Colleen Beaumier	Liberal	1993	1st term
Brant	**Jane Stewart**	Liberal	1993	1st term
Broadview—Greenwood	Dennis Mills ‡	Liberal	1988	2nd term
Broadview—Greenwood	Dennis Mills ‡	Independent Liberal*	1988	2nd term
Broadview—Greenwood	Dennis Mills ‡	Liberal	1988	2nd term
Bruce—Grey	Ovid Jackson ‡	Liberal	1993	1st term
Burlington	Paddy Torsney	Liberal	1993	1st term
Cambridge	Janko Peric	Liberal	1993	1st term
Carleton—Gloucester	Eugène Bellemare	Liberal	1988	2nd term
Cochrane—Superior	Réginald Bélair ‡	Liberal	1988	2nd term
Davenport	Charles Caccia	Liberal	1968	8th term
Don Valley East	**David Collenette**	Liberal	1974, 1980, 1993	3rd term*
Don Valley North	Sarkis Assadourian	Liberal	1993	1st term
Don Valley West	John Godfrey ‡	Liberal	1993	1st term
Durham	Alex Shepherd	Liberal	1993	1st term
Eglinton—Lawrence	Joe Volpe ‡	Liberal	1988	2nd term
Elgin—Norfolk	Gar Knutson	Liberal	1993	1st term
Erie	John Maloney	Liberal	1993	1st term
Essex-Kent	Jerry Pickard ‡	Liberal	1988	2nd term
Essex-Windsor	Susan Whelan ‡	Liberal	1993	1st term
Etobicoke Centre	**Allan Rock**	Liberal	1993	1st term
Etobicoke North	**Roy MacLaren**	Liberal	1979, 1988	4th term*
Etobicoke North	Roy Cullen (1996)**	Liberal	1996	1st term
Etobicoke—Lakeshore	Jean Augustine ‡	Liberal	1993	1st term
Glengarry—Prescott—Russell	**Don Boudria**	Liberal	1984	3rd term
Guelph—Wellington	Brenda Chamberlain	Liberal	1993	1st term
Haldimand—Norfolk	Bob Speller	Liberal	1988	2nd term
Halton—Peel	Julian Reed	Liberal	1993	1st term
Hamilton East	**Sheila Copps**	Liberal	1984	3rd term
Hamilton Mountain	Beth Phinney	Liberal	1988	2nd term
Hamilton—Wentworth	John Bryden	Liberal	1993	1st term
Hamilton West	Stan Keyes ‡	Liberal	1988	2nd term
Hastings—Frontenac—Lennox and Addington	Larry McCormick	Liberal	1993	1st term
Huron—Bruce	Paul Steckle	Liberal	1993	1st term
Kenora—Rainy River	Bob Nault ‡	Liberal	1988	2nd term
Kent	Rex Crawford	Liberal	1988	2nd term
Kingston and the Islands	Peter Milliken ‡	Liberal	1988	2nd term
Kitchener	John English ‡	Liberal	1993	1st term
Lambton—Kent—Middlesex	Rose-Marie Ur	Liberal	1993	1st term
Lanark—Carleton	Ian Murray	Liberal	1993	1st term
Leeds—Grenville	Jim Jordan	Liberal	1988	2nd term
Lincoln	Tony Valeri	Liberal	1993	1st term
London East	Joe Fontana ‡	Liberal	1988	2nd term
London—Middlesex	Pat O'Brien	Liberal	1993	1st term
London West	Sue Barnes ‡	Liberal	1993	1st term
Markham—Whitchurch—Stouffville	Jag Bhaduria	Liberal	1993	1st term
Markham—Whitchurch—Stouffville	Jag Bhaduria	Independent Liberal***	1993	1st term
Mississauga East	Albina Guarnieri ‡	Liberal	1988	2nd term
Mississauga South	Paul Szabo	Liberal	1993	1st term
Mississauga West	Carolyn Parrish	Liberal	1993	1st term
Nepean	Beryl Gaffney	Liberal	1988	2nd term
Niagara Falls	Gary Pillitteri	Liberal	1993	1st term
Nickel Belt	Raymond Bonin	Liberal	1993	1st term
Nipissing	Bob Wood	Liberal	1988	2nd term
Northumberland	**Christine Stewart**	Liberal	1988	2nd term
Oakville—Milton	Bonnie Brown	Liberal	1993	1st term
Ontario	Dan McTeague	Liberal	1993	1st term
Oshawa	Ivan Grose	Liberal	1993	1st term
Ottawa Centre	Mac Harb ‡	Liberal	1988	2nd term
Ottawa South	**John Manley**	Liberal	1988	2nd term
Ottawa West	Marlene Catterall ‡	Liberal	1988	2nd term
Ottawa—Vanier	Jean-Robert Gauthier	Liberal	1972	7th term
Ottawa—Vanier	Mauril Bélanger (1995)****	Liberal	1995	1st term
Oxford	John Baird Finlay	Liberal	1993	1st term
Parkdale—High Park	Jesse Flis ‡	Liberal	1979, 1988	4th term*
Parry Sound-Muskoka	Andy Mitchell	Liberal	1993	1st term
Perth—Wellington—Waterloo	John Richardson ‡	Liberal	1993	1st term
Peterborough	Peter Adams	Liberal	1993	1st term
Prince Edward—Hastings	Lyle Vanclief ‡	Liberal	1988	2nd term
Renfrew—Nipissing—Pembroke	Len Hopkins	Liberal	1965	9th term
Rosedale	Bill Graham	Liberal	1993	1st term
Sarnia—Lambton	Roger Gallaway	Liberal	1993	1st term
Sault Ste. Marie	**Ron Irwin**	Liberal	1980, 1993	2nd term*
Scarborough Centre	John Cannis	Liberal	1993	1st term
Scarborough East	**Doug Peters**	Liberal	1993	1st term
Scarborough West	Tom Wappel	Liberal	1988	2nd term
Scarborough—Agincourt	Jim Karygiannis	Liberal	1988	2nd term
Scarborough—Rouge River	Derek Lee	Liberal	1988	2nd term
Simcoe Centre	Ed Harper	Reform	1993	1st term
Simcoe North	Paul DeVillers ‡	Liberal	1993	1st term
St. Catharines	Walt Lastewka	Liberal	1993	1st term
St. Paul's	Barry Campbell ‡	Liberal	1993	1st term
Stormont—Dundas	Bob Kilger	Liberal	1988	2nd term
Sudbury	**Diane Marleau**	Liberal	1988	2nd term
Thunder Bay—Atikokan	Stan Dromisky	Liberal	1993	1st term
Thunder Bay—Nipigon	Joe Comuzzi	Liberal	1988	2nd term
Timiskaming—French River	Benoît Serré	Liberal	1993	1st term
Timmins—Chapleau	Peter Thalheimer	Liberal	1993	1st term
Trinity—Spadina	Tony Ianno	Liberal	1993	1st term
Victoria—Haliburton	John O'Reilly	Liberal	1993	1st term
Waterloo	Andrew Telegdi	Liberal	1993	1st term
Welland—St. Catharines—Thorold	Gilbert Parent (†)	Liberal	1974, (Note: St. Catharines/Welland) 1988	5th term*
Wellington—Grey—Dufferin—Simcoe	Murray Calder	Liberal	1993	1st term
Willowdale	Jim Peterson	Liberal	1980, 1988	3rd term*
Windsor West	**Herb Gray**	Liberal	1962	11th time
Windsor—St. Clair	Shaughnessy Cohen	Liberal	1993	1st term
York Centre	**Art Eggleton**	Liberal	1993	1st term
York North	Maurizio Bevilacqua ‡	Liberal	1988	2nd term
York South—Weston	John Nunziata	Liberal	1984	3rd term
York South—Weston	John Nunziata	Independent*****	1984	3rd term
York—Simcoe	Karen Kraft Sloan ‡	Liberal	1993	1st term
York West	**Sergio Marchi**	Liberal	1984	3rd term

* Dennis Mills quit the Liberal caucus to sit as an Independent Liberal in May 1996, but returned to the party in August of the same year.
** Roy MacLaren was appointed High Commissioner of Canada in the United Kingdom, and his seat was filled by Roy Cullen in a by-election in 1996.
*** Jag Bhaduria was expelled from the Liberal Party for falsifying his credentials.
**** Jean-Robert Gauthier was appointed to the Senate in 1994, and replaced by Mauril Bélanger in a by-election in 1995.
***** John Nunziata was expelled from the Liberal Party for voting against the 1996 budget on April 16 of that year, and sat for the rest of the session as an independent.

==== Prince Edward Island ====
Riding	Member	Political party	First elected / previously elected	No. of terms
Cardigan	**Lawrence MacAulay**	Liberal	1988	2nd term
Egmont	Joe McGuire	Liberal	1988	2nd term
Hillsborough	George Proud ‡	Liberal	1988	2nd term
Malpeque	Wayne Easter	Liberal	1993	1st term

==== Quebec ====
Riding	Member	Political party	First elected / previously elected	No. of terms
Abitibi	Bernard Deshaies	Bloc Québécois	1993	1st term
Ahuntsic	Michel Daviault	Bloc Québécois	1993	1st term
Anjou—Rivière-des-Prairies	Roger Pomerleau	Bloc Québécois	1993	1st term
Argenteuil—Papineau	Maurice Dumas	Bloc Québécois	1993	1st term
Beauce	Gilles Bernier	Independent	1984	3rd term
Beauharnois—Salaberry	Laurent Lavigne	Bloc Québécois	1993	1st term
Beauport—Montmorency—Orléans	Michel Guimond	Bloc Québécois	1993	1st term
Bellechasse	François Langlois	Bloc Québécois	1993	1st term
Berthier—Montcalm	Michel Bellehumeur	Bloc Québécois	1993	1st term
Blainville—Deux-Montagnes	Paul Mercier	Bloc Québécois	1993	1st term
Bonaventure—Îles-de-la-Madeleine	Patrick Gagnon ‡	Liberal	1993	1st term
Bourassa	Osvaldo Nunez	Bloc Québécois	1993	1st term
Brome—Missisquoi	Gaston Péloquin	Bloc Québécois	1993	1st term
Brome—Missisquoi	Denis Paradis (1995)*	Liberal	1995	1st term
Chambly	Ghislain Lebel	Bloc Québécois	1993	1st term
Champlain	Réjean Lefebvre	Bloc Québécois	1993	1st term
Charlesbourg	Jean-Marc Jacob	Bloc Québécois	1993	1st term
Charlevoix	Gérard Asselin	Bloc Québécois	1993	1st term
Chateauguay	Maurice Godin	Bloc Québécois	1993	1st term
Chicoutimi	Gilbert Fillion	Bloc Québécois	1993	1st term
Drummond	Pauline Picard	Bloc Québécois	1993	1st term
Frontenac	Jean-Guy Chrétien	Bloc Québécois	1993	1st term
Gaspé	Yvan Bernier	Bloc Québécois	1993	1st term
Gatineau—La Lièvre	Mark Assad	Liberal	1988	2nd term
Hochelaga—Maisonneuve	Réal Ménard	Bloc Québécois	1993	1st term
Hull—Aylmer	**Marcel Massé**	Liberal	1993	1st term
Joliette	René Laurin	Bloc Québécois	1993	1st term
Jonquière	André Caron**	Bloc Québécois	1993	1st term
Kamouraska—Rivière-du-Loup	Paul Crête	Bloc Québécois	1993	1st term
La Prairie	Richard Bélisle	Bloc Québécois	1993	1st term
Lac-Saint-Jean	Lucien Bouchard	Bloc Québécois	1988	3rd term
Lac-Saint-Jean	Stéphan Tremblay (1996)***	Bloc Québécois	1996	1st term
Lachine—Lac-Saint-Louis	Clifford Lincoln ‡	Liberal	1993	1st term
LaSalle—Émard	**Paul Martin**	Liberal	1988	2nd term
Laurentides	Monique Guay	Bloc Québécois	1993	1st term
Laurier—Sainte-Marie	Gilles Duceppe	Bloc Québécois	1990	2nd term
Laval Centre	Madeleine Dalphond-Guiral	Bloc Québécois	1993	1st term
Laval East	Maud Debien	Bloc Québécois	1993	1st term
Laval West	**Michel Dupuy**	Liberal	1993	1st term
Lévis	Antoine Dubé	Bloc Québécois	1993	1st term
Longueuil	Nic Leblanc	Bloc Québécois	1984	3rd term
Longueuil	Nic Leblanc	Independent Sovereigntist****	1984	3rd term
Lotbinière	Jean Landry	Bloc Québécois	1993	1st term
Louis-Hébert	Philippe Paré	Bloc Québécois	1993	1st term
Manicouagan	Bernard St-Laurent	Bloc Québécois	1993	1st term
Manicouagan	Bernard St-Laurent	Independent*****	1993	1st term
Matapédia—Matane	René Canuel	Bloc Québécois	1993	1st term
Mégantic—Compton—Stanstead	Maurice Bernier	Bloc Québécois	1993	1st term
Mercier	Francine Lalonde	Bloc Québécois	1993	1st term
Mount Royal	**Sheila Finestone**	Liberal	1984	3rd term
Notre-Dame-de-Grâce	Warren Allmand	Liberal	1965	9th term
Outremont	**Martin Cauchon**	Liberal	1993	1st term
Papineau—Saint-Michel	**André Ouellet**	Liberal	1967	9th term
Papineau—Saint-Michel	**Pierre Pettigrew** (1996)******	Liberal	1996	1st term
Pierrefonds—Dollard	Bernard Patry ‡	Liberal	1993	1st term
Pontiac—Gatineau—Labelle	Robert Bertrand	Liberal	1993	1st term
Portneuf	Pierre de Savoye	Bloc Québécois	1993	1st term
Québec	Christiane Gagnon	Bloc Québécois	1993	1st term
Quebec East	Jean-Paul Marchand	Bloc Québécois	1993	1st term
Richelieu	Louis Plamondon	Bloc Québécois	1984	3rd term
Richmond—Wolfe	Gaston Leroux	Bloc Québécois	1993	1st term
Rimouski—Témiscouata	Suzanne Tremblay	Bloc Québécois	1993	1st term
Roberval	Michel Gauthier	Bloc Québécois	1993	1st term
Rosemont	Benoît Tremblay	Bloc Québécois	1988	2nd term
Saint-Denis	Eleni Bakopanos	Liberal	1993	1st term
Saint-Henri—Westmount	David Berger	Liberal	1979	5th term
Saint-Henri—Westmount	**Lucienne Robillard** (1995)*******	Liberal	1995	1st term
Saint-Hubert	Pierrette Venne	Bloc Québécois	1988	2nd term
Saint-Hyacinthe—Bagot	Yvan Loubier	Bloc Québécois	1993	1st term
Saint-Jean	Claude Bachand	Bloc Québécois	1993	1st term
Saint-Laurent—Cartierville	Shirley Maheu	Liberal	1988	2nd term
Saint-Laurent—Cartierville	**Stéphane Dion** (1996)********	Liberal	1996	1st term
Saint-Léonard	**Alfonso Gagliano**	Liberal	1984	3rd term
Saint-Maurice	**Jean Chrétien**	Liberal	1963, 1990	10th term*
Shefford	Jean Leroux	Bloc Québécois	1993	1st term
Sherbrooke	Jean Charest	Progressive Conservative	1984	3rd term
Témiscamingue	Pierre Brien	Bloc Québécois	1993	1st term
Terrebonne	Benoît Sauvageau	Bloc Québécois	1993	1st term
Trois-Rivières	Yves Rocheleau	Bloc Québécois	1993	1st term
Vaudreuil	Nick Discepola ‡	Liberal	1993	1st term
Verchères	Stéphane Bergeron	Bloc Québécois	1993	1st term
Verdun—Saint-Paul	Raymond Lavigne	Liberal	1993	1st term

* Gaston Péloquin died in a car accident in 1994, and was replaced by Denis Paradis in a by-election on February 13, 1995.
** André Caron died in office on January 10, 1997, and the seat remains vacant for the reminder of parliament
*** Lucien Bouchard left parliament in 1995 to become premier of Quebec; Stéphan Tremblay is elected to replace him in a by-election.
**** Nic Leblanc left the Bloc Québécois and sat as an "Independent Sovereigntist" on March 17, 1997.
***** Bernard St-Laurent left the Bloc Québécois and sat as an independent on March 5, 1997.
****** André Ouellet was appointed head of Canada Post, and was replaced by Pierre Pettigrew in a by-election on March 25, 1996.
******* David Berger was appointed Canadian Ambassador to Israel and high commissioner to Cyprus in 1994, and was replaced by Lucienne Robillard in a by-election on February 13, 1995.
******** Shirley Maheu was appointed to the Senate, and was replaced by Stéphane Dion also in a by-election on March 26, 1996.

==== Saskatchewan ====
Riding	Member	Political party	First elected / previously elected	No. of terms
Kindersley—Lloydminster	Elwin Hermanson	Reform	1993	1st term
Mackenzie	Vic Althouse	New Democrat	1980	4th term
Moose Jaw—Lake Centre	Allan Kerpan	Reform	1993	1st term
Prince Albert—Churchill River	Gordon Kirkby ‡	Liberal	1993	1st term
Regina—Lumsden	John Solomon	New Democrat	1993	1st term
Regina—Qu'Appelle	Simon De Jong	New Democrat	1979	5th term
Regina—Wascana	**Ralph Goodale**	Liberal	1974, (Note: Assiniboia) 1993	2nd term*
Saskatoon—Clark's Crossing	Chris Axworthy	New Democrat	1988	2nd term
Saskatoon—Dundurn	Morris Bodnar ‡	Liberal	1993	1st term
Saskatoon—Humboldt	Georgette Sheridan	Liberal	1993	1st term
Souris—Moose Mountain	Bernie Collins	Liberal	1993	1st term
Swift Current—Maple Creek—Assiniboia	Lee Morrison	Reform	1993	1st term
The Battlefords—Meadow Lake	Len Taylor	New Democrat	1988	2nd term
Yorkton—Melville	Garry Breitkreuz	Reform	1993	1st term

==== Territories ====
Riding	Member	Political party	First elected / previously elected	No. of terms
Western Arctic	**Ethel Blondin-Andrew**	Liberal	1988	2nd term
Nunatsiaq	Jack Anawak ‡	Liberal	1988	2nd term
Yukon	Audrey McLaughlin	New Democrat	1987	3rd term

== By-elections ==
By-election	Date	Incumbent	Party	Winner	Party	Cause	Retained
Hamilton East	June 17, 1996	Sheila Copps	Liberal	Sheila Copps	Liberal	Resignation	Yes
Humber—St. Barbe—Baie Verte	March 25, 1996	Brian Tobin	Liberal	Gerry Byrne	Liberal	Resignation	Yes
Labrador	March 25, 1996	Bill Rompkey	Liberal	Lawrence D. O'Brien	Liberal	Resignation	Yes
Etobicoke North	March 25, 1996	Roy MacLaren	Liberal	Roy Cullen	Liberal	Resignation	Yes
Lac-Saint-Jean	March 25, 1996	Lucien Bouchard	Bloc Québécois	Stéphan Tremblay	Bloc Québécois	Resignation after being elected leader of the Parti Quebecois and Premier of Quebec following the resignation of Jacques Parizeau	Yes
Papineau—Saint-Michel	March 25, 1996	André Ouellet	Liberal	Pierre Pettigrew	Liberal	Resignation	Yes
Saint-Laurent—Cartierville	March 25, 1996	Shirley Maheu	Liberal	Stéphane Dion	Liberal	Called to the Senate	Yes
Ottawa—Vanier	February 13, 1995	Jean-Robert Gauthier	Liberal	Mauril Bélanger	Liberal	Resignation	Yes
Brome—Missisquoi	February 13, 1995	Gaston Péloquin	Bloc Québécois	Denis Paradis	Liberal	Death (car accident)	No
Saint-Henri—Westmount	February 13, 1995	David Berger	Liberal	Lucienne Robillard	Liberal	Resignation	Yes

== See also ==
- List of Canadian electoral districts (1987–1996) for a list of the ridings in this parliament.
