= Raymond Squires =

Canadian businessman and politician (1926–2019)

The Honourable Raymond G. Squires

Senator for Newfoundland and Labrador
- In office June 9, 2000 – February 6, 2001
- Appointed by: Jean Chrétien
- Preceded by: Philip Lewis
- Succeeded by: George Baker

Personal details
- Born: February 6, 1926 St. Anthony, Newfoundland and Labrador
- Died: October 8, 2019 (aged 93) Newfoundland and Labrador, Canada
- Party: Liberal
- Occupation: Businessman

Raymond G. Squires, CM (February 6, 1926 – October 8, 2019) was a Canadian businessman and retired senator.

Born in St. Anthony, Newfoundland and Labrador, he was the owner a gas and automobile service station and a motel. He was a St. Anthony city councilor for twelve years and mayor for eight years.

In June 2000, he was summoned to the Senate of Canada by Adrienne Clarkson on the advice of Jean Chrétien representing the senatorial division of Newfoundland and Labrador. A Liberal, he served until 75th birthday in February 2001.

In 1997, he was made a Member of the Order of Canada for his "lifelong commitment to the social welfare of his fellow citizens through his contributions as a businessman, philanthropist and municipal politician". He died on October 8, 2019.
