= John Sylvain =

Canadian politician

The Honourable John Sylvain

Senator for Rougemont, Quebec
- In office September 7, 1990 – February 1, 1996
- Appointed by: Brian Mulroney
- Preceded by: Jacques Flynn
- Succeeded by: Shirley Maheu

Personal details
- Born: June 7, 1924 London, England, UK
- Died: August 16, 2011 (aged 87) La Malbaie, Quebec, Canada
- Party: Progressive Conservative

John Sylvain (June 7, 1924 – August 16, 2011) was a Montreal insurance executive who was named to the Senate of Canada by Brian Mulroney in 1990.

The British born Sylvain had headed United Provinces Insurance Co. Ltd. and served as a director on the Canadian Development Investment Corporation. During the 1988 federal election he was campaign manager for Progressive Conservative cabinet minister Robert Layton in the Montreal-area riding of Lachine—Lac-Saint-Louis.

Sylvain was one of several Senators named by Mulroney in 1990 with the purpose of creating a Progressive Conservative majority in the upper house in order to pass the enactment of the Goods and Services Tax which had been delayed by the Senate's Liberal majority.

He served as deputy chair of the Canadian Senate Standing Committee on Banking, Trade and Commerce.

Sylvain decided to retire early from the Senate and left the body on February 1, 1996, three years before reaching the mandatory retirement age of 75. Sylvain's retirement allowed the Liberals, who were again in government, to regain control of the Senate.

He is the brother in law of financier and Power Corporation of Canada chairman Paul Desmarais, Sr.
