= Melvin Perry =

Canadian politician

The Hon. Melvin Perry (Poirier)

Senator for Prince Edward Island
- In office 11 August 1999 – 23 August 2000
- Appointed by: Jean Chrétien

Personal details
- Born: 23 August 1925 St-Edward, Prince Edward Island
- Died: 25 January 2002 (aged 76)
- Party: Liberal

Melvin Perry (Poirier) (23 August 1925 – 25 January 2002) was a Canadian politician. He also went by the name Perry Poirier.

Born in St. Edward, Prince Edward Island, he received a Bachelor of Arts degree in 1952 from the University of St. Joseph's College. He was a teacher for 34 years including 15 years as a Principal. He retired from teaching in 1987.

In 1999, he was appointed by Prime Minister Jean Chrétien to the Canadian Senate, representing the senatorial division of Prince Edward Island. He was the first Acadian appointed from Prince Edward Island since Joseph-Octave Arsenault was appointed in 1895, he served a little less than a year until he retired at the age of 75.
