= Maurice Riel =

Canadian politician

The Honourable Maurice Riel PC QC

Senator for Shawinegan, Quebec
- In office 1973–1997
- Appointed by: Pierre Trudeau
- Preceded by: Léon Méthot
- Succeeded by: Lucie Pépin

Personal details
- Born: April 3, 1922 St-Constant, Quebec, Canada
- Died: July 20, 2007 (aged 85)
- Party: Liberal

Maurice Riel, PC QC (April 3, 1922 – July 20, 2007) was a Canadian lawyer and Senator.

A distant relative of Louis Riel, Maurice Riel studied law and was admitted to the bar of Quebec in 1945. Establishing his own law firm in Montreal with Louis-René Beaudoin under the name Beaudoin, Riel (today Dunton Rainville), Riel worked in international law with a number of clients in France. He was appointed Queen's Counsel in 1958, and served as chairman of the Metropolitan Montreal Corporation from 1965 to 1969. He served on the board of the Bank of Canada from 1969 to 1973.

Riel joined the Liberal Party of Canada in 1947, and served in various capacities with the party. He was appointed to the Senate on the advice of Prime Minister Pierre Trudeau in 1973, and worked on immigration policy and foreign affairs amongst other issues. He was appointed Speaker of the Senate of Canada on December 16, 1983, but served for less than a year in that position due to the Progressive Conservative Party's victory in the 1984 general election. He was replaced as Speaker by Progressive Conservative Guy Charbonneau.

Riel remained active in the Senate until his retirement in 1997. He died on July 20, 2007.
