= Richard Doyle (politician) =

Canadian politician

The Honourable Richard James Doyle OC

Canadian Senator from Ontario
- In office 1985–1998
- Appointed by: Brian Mulroney

Personal details
- Born: March 10, 1923 Toronto, Ontario, Canada
- Died: April 9, 2003 (aged 80)
- Party: Progressive Conservative
- Committees: Chair, Standing Committee of Selection (1991-1993)

Richard (Dic) James Doyle, OC (March 10, 1923 – April 9, 2003) was a Canadian journalist, editor, and Senator.

== Background ==
Born in Toronto, Ontario, he served in the Royal Canadian Air Force during World War II, and retired in 1945 with the rank of Flying Officer.

He joined The Globe and Mail in 1951, becoming editor in 1963 and Editor-in-chief in 1978. He was succeeded by Norman Webster in 1983.

He is the author of two books: The Royal Story and Hurly-Burly: A Time at the Globe.

He was appointed to the Senate in 1985 representing the senatorial division of North York, Ontario and sat as a Progressive Conservative until his mandatory retirement when he turned 75.

In 1983, he was made an Officer of the Order of Canada. He was made a member of the Canadian News Hall of Fame in 1990.
