= Fernand Roberge =

Canadian politician and hotelier (1940–2026)

The Honourable Fernand Roberge

Senator from Quebec (Saurel)
- In office 1993–2000
- Preceded by: Fernand Leblanc
- Succeeded by: Jean Lapointe

Personal details
- Born: July 19, 1940 Laurierville, Quebec, Canada
- Died: February 22, 2026 (aged 85)
- Party: Progressive Conservative
- Profession: Hotelier

Fernand Roberge (July 19, 1940 – February 22, 2026) was a Canadian a hotelier and politician who served as a senator.

In 1977, Roberge became the first French Canadian to be chief executive officer of the Ritz-Carlton Hotel in Montreal and held the post for over 12 years. He was also part-owner of the hotel until selling his interest in 1991 to the Rolaco Group of New York.

He was appointed to the upper house by Prime Minister Brian Mulroney in May 1993, a month before the Progressive Conservative leader retired from office. Mulroney and Roberge were long time friends. Mulroney had previously appointed Roberge to the board of Air Canada in 1985.

Roberge had been one of the members of the "Ritz Gang" which helped Mulroney plot the downfall of then-Progressive Conservative leader Joe Clark in 1983 precipitating the 1983 Progressive Conservative leadership convention won by Mulroney.

In the lead up to the 1984 federal election, Roberge was a member of the Progressive Conservative party's candidate selection committee for Quebec. After the election, he was appointed chairman of the Mulroney government's patronage advisory committee for Quebec.

Shortly before the 1993 Progressive Conservative leadership convention, Roberge endorsed Kim Campbell for leader of the Progressive Conservative Party of Canada.

In 1998, Roberge was named one of the 10 senators with the worst attendance record in the chamber. He resigned from the body in July 2000 at the age of 60 in order to spend more time on his business affairs saying in the statement that, "I want to concentrate all my energies on various business projects and this involvement becomes increasingly incompatible with Senate duties in Ottawa."

In 2007, he was appointed chairman of the Ritz-Carlton advisory committee.

From the early 1990s, Roberge was also President and Chief Executive Officer of Stratcorp Inc., a management consulting society where he assists with special projects involving international strategic alliances, mergers and acquisitions and was a special advisor to the firm of Jones Lang LaSalle.

Roberge died on February 22, 2026, at the age of 85.
