= Roch Bolduc =

Canadian politician (born 1928)

The Honourable Roch Bolduc OC CQ

Senator for Gulf, Quebec
- In office September 26, 1988 – September 10, 2003
- Appointed by: Brian Mulroney
- Preceded by: Paul Lafond
- Succeeded by: Roméo Dallaire

Personal details
- Born: September 10, 1928 (age 97) Saint-Raphaël, Quebec, Canada
- Party: Progressive Conservative
- Spouse: Gisèle Lacroix
- Children: Louise, Jacques, Richard and André
- Occupation: Administrator, public servant

Roch Bolduc OC CQ (born September 10, 1928) is a former Canadian civil servant and Senator from the province of Quebec.

Born in Saint-Raphaël, Quebec, he received a Bachelor of Arts degree in 1948 and a Doctorate of Law degree in 1951 from Université Laval.

He was summoned to the Senate in 1988 on the advice of Prime Minister Brian Mulroney and represented the senatorial division of Gulf, Quebec. He sat as a Progressive Conservative and retired in 2003. In 1984, he was made an Officer of the Order of Canada. In 1998, he was made a Knight of the National Order of Quebec.

== Personal life ==
He married Gisèle Lacroix in 1954. They have four children: Louise, Jacques, Richard and André. In fall 2012, he published his memoirs, Le Mandarin de l'ombre.
