= Michel Cogger =

Canadian politician (1939–2025)

The Honourable Michel Cogger KC

Senator for Lauzon, Quebec
- In office 1986–2000
- Appointed by: Brian Mulroney
- Preceded by: Jean-Paul Deschatelets
- Succeeded by: Yves Morin

Personal details
- Born: Michel Benoit Cogger; March 21, 1939 Quebec City, Quebec, Canada
- Died: January 27, 2025 (aged 85)
- Party: Progressive Conservative

Michel Benoit Cogger, KC (March 21, 1939 – January 27, 2025) was a Canadian businessman, lawyer and politician in Quebec who served in the Senate of Canada.

Cogger was a senior political advisor to and fundraiser for Progressive Conservative prime minister Brian Mulroney and helped run the party's campaigns in Quebec in the 1984 and 1988 federal elections in which the Tories swept the province.

== Early life ==
Cogger attended law school at Laval University in the 1960s, where he became friends with Mulroney. The two were among a group of students who organized the Congrès des affaires canadiennes.

== Career ==
Cogger was campaign manager during Mulroney's bid to win the 1976 Progressive Conservative leadership convention as well as the successful campaign which forced Joe Clark to call a 1983 leadership convention.

In 1986, Muroney named Cogger to the Senate. In 1991, the Royal Canadian Mounted Police laid influence peddling charges alleging that Cogger had taken payments from businessman Guy Montpetit in exchange for the use of Cogger's influence to win government grants and contacts. Cogger was acquitted in 1993 but in 1997 the Supreme Court of Canada ordered a new trial which led to Cogger's conviction in 1998. He was fined $3,000, put on 12 months' probation and ordered to do 120 hours of community service. Cogger successfully appealed the sentence which was substituted by an absolute discharge in 2001.

In September 2000, Cogger resigned from the Senate. He had been largely absent from the upper house during his legal battles and was fined a total of $23,250 for missing sessions.

== Death ==
Cogger died on January 27, 2025, at the age of 85.
