= Erminie Cohen =

Canadian politician (1926–2019)

The Honourable Erminie Cohen CM

Senator for Saint John, New Brunswick
- In office 1993–2001
- Appointed by: Brian Mulroney

Personal details
- Born: Erminie Joy Bernstein; July 23, 1926 Saint John, New Brunswick
- Died: February 15, 2019 (aged 92) Saint John, New Brunswick
- Party: Progressive Conservative

Erminie Cohen CM (née Bernstein; July 23, 1926 – February 15, 2019) was a Canadian politician who served in the Senate from 1993 to 2001.

== Biography ==
Born Erminie Joy Bernstein in Saint John, New Brunswick, she graduated from Mount Allison University. In the 1970s, she co-founded Saint John Women for Action. She was a founding member of the Board of Hestia House, a trustee of Saint Joseph's Hospital, member of the Human Development Council, and Chair of Opera New Brunswick. She was the Chair of the New Brunswick Adoption Foundation Board, and President of the Foundation (Saint John) up until her death.

She was appointed on the recommendation of Prime Minister Brian Mulroney to the Senate of Canada in 1993 representing the senatorial division of Saint John, New Brunswick. She was a member of the Progressive Conservative Party caucus until her retirement in 2001, where she continued her devotion to social causes in particular, poverty. This included acting as the co-chair of the Progressive Conservative National Caucus Task Force on Poverty, and spearheading attempts to make discrimination based on social condition prohibited under the Canadian Human Rights Act.

Her awards include a Doctorate of Laws from the University of New Brunswick in Saint John, the Humanitarian Service Award from the Salvation Army, the Red Cross Humanitarian Award, and was also honoured by the Rotary Club as a Paul Harris Fellow. She was awarded an honorary doctorate of laws degree from the University of New Brunswick.

== Personal life and death ==
In 1948, she married Edgar R. Cohen. Together with her husband, she operated a women's fashion store and various real estate developments. She had three children: Shelley, Lee and Cathy.

She died on February 15, 2019, at the Saint John Regional Hospital.

She is buried in Shaarei Zedek Cemetery, Saint John, NB, Canada.
