= Duncan Jessiman =

Canadian politician

The Honourable Duncan James Jessiman QC

Canadian Senator from Manitoba
- In office 1993–1998
- Appointed by: Brian Mulroney

Personal details
- Born: June 5, 1923 Winnipeg, Manitoba, Canada
- Died: April 19, 2006 (aged 82) Vancouver, British Columbia, Canada
- Education: University of Manitoba (BA, LLB, LLM)

Duncan James Jessiman, QC (June 5, 1923 – April 19, 2006) was a Canadian politician and lawyer.

== Early life and career ==
Born in Winnipeg, Manitoba, he received a Bachelor of Arts, a Bachelor of Law, and a Master of Law all from the University of Manitoba. During World War II, he served with the Royal Canadian Navy and was discharged with the rank of Lieutenant in 1945. From 1948 to 1971, he practiced law with the firm of Johnston, Jessiman & Gardner. In 1971, he became a senior partner at the law firm Pitblado & Hoskin. From 1956 to 1967, he was a lecturer in corporation law at the University of Manitoba. He was appointed Queen's Counsel in 1959. He was a member of the board of the University of Winnipeg for 16 years.

== Political career ==
In 1993, he was appointed to the Senate by Brian Mulroney and represented the senatorial division of Manitoba. He served as a Progressive Conservative and retired on his 75th birthday in 1998.

== Personal life ==
He was married to Alix and had three children: Duncan, Robert, and Sally.
