= Philippe Gigantès =

Canadian politician

The Honourable Philippe Gigantès

Senator from De Lorimier, Quebec
- In office 1984–1998
- Appointed by: Pierre Trudeau
- Preceded by: Raymond Eudes
- Succeeded by: Joan Fraser

Associate Minister of Culture (Greece)
- In office 1964–1965
- Appointed by: Constantine II of Greece
- Preceded by: TBD
- Succeeded by: post abolished by Greek military junta of 1967–1974

Personal details
- Born: Philippe Deane Gigantès; August 16, 1923 Salonica, Greece
- Died: December 9, 2004 (aged 81) Montreal, Quebec
- Party: Liberal
- Spouse: Susan Elrington
- Relations: Terry Gigantes - Brother
- Children: Eleni, Claire and Eve Marie
- Education: University of Toronto
- Occupation: Senator, journalist, academic
- Profession: Journalist, author

Philippe Deane Gigantès (August 16, 1923 – December 9, 2004) was a veteran of the Second World War, journalist, war correspondent, POW of the Korean War, author, television commentator, Greek minister of culture, and Canadian senator.

== War and journalism ==
Gigantès served in the British Royal Navy during the Second World War. After the war, he became a journalist, working for the London Observer, in Greece, North Africa, and South Asia, from 1946 to 1961.

Gigantès covered the Korean War as the war correspondent from International News Service.

Whilst covering the Korean War he was taken prisoner, and spent 33 months in a North Korean prison camp. During this time he was interned with George Blake. After his release he wrote the book I was a Captive in Korea, which he published under the name “Philip Deane,” and returned to his career in journalism. He became the Washington correspondent for the London Observer and The Globe and Mail.

From 1965 to the 1970s, he was a journalist in Canada. During the 1970s he was speech writer and top aide to Canadian Prime Minister Pierre Trudeau.

== Greek Minister of Culture ==
He worked as a United Nations official. In 1964 he was appointed to the post of associate Greek Minister of Culture, serving until 1965. He later resumed his career in the media as a television commentator from 1965 to 1970s.

== Academic career and Canadian civil servant ==
From 1965 to 1968 completed his Bachelor of Arts, Master and PhD at the University of Toronto.

After his graduation he served as Dean of Arts at Bishop's University and Dean of Arts and Science at University of Lethbridge.

In the 1970s he served with the Official Languages Commission and the Treasury Board.

== Canadian Senator ==
In 1980 he ran for MP in the Canadian riding of Broadview-Greenwood, but was defeated by Bob Rae. In 1984 while working as an editorialist at the Montreal Gazette he was appointed to the Senate of Canada by Pierre Trudeau, for whom he had worked between 1978 and 1980 as a researcher then head of the Liberal Caucus Research Office. He served in the Senate until his 75th birthday in 1998.

While in the Senate he served on many committees but was particularly proud of his work as chair of an adhoc committee on the future of work. His report of this work was published by Parliament under the title Only Work Works and in French under the title "Il n'y a que le Travail qui Vaille.

== Electoral record ==
1980 Canadian federal election: Broadview—Greenwood
Party	Candidate	Votes	%
New Democratic	Bob Rae	12,953	40.37
Liberal	Philippe Gigantès	10,601	33.04
Progressive Conservative	Michael Clarke	7,677	23.92
Libertarian	Walter Belej	352	1.10
Rhinoceros	Vicki Butterfield	196	0.61
Communist	Ed McDonald	164	0.51
National	Don Hayward	53	0.17
Marxist–Leninist	Dorothy-Jean O'Donnell	53	0.17
Independent	Milorad Novich	40	0.12
Total valid votes		32,089	100.00
Rejected, unmarked and declined ballots		270	
Turnout		32,359	70.04
Electors on the lists		46,204	
Source: Canadian Elections Database

== Author ==
He was the author of 15 books including I Should Have Died, Is the Free Trade Deal Really for You? (1988) and Power and Greed: A Short History of the World (2002).

In his book Nice Work: The Continuing Scandal of Canada's Senate, journalist and author Claire Hoy wrote that Gigantes, during a filibuster in the Senate, read one of his books into the record; another senator suggested that he did this to get the work translated into French for free by parliamentary staff responsible for Hansard.

== Death ==
Gigantès died on December 9, 2004, of prostate cancer in Montreal. He left behind his wife Susan, his first wife Molly, three daughters Eleni, Claire and Eve Marie, two grandsons and a granddaughter. He was predeceased by his second wife Sylvie. His ashes were scattered in the waters of the Mediterranean Sea near Kefalonia, Greece.
