= Doris Margaret Anderson =

Canadian nutritionist and senator (1922–2022)

The Honourable Doris Margaret Anderson CM

Senator for St Peter's, Prince Edward Island
- In office September 21, 1995 – July 5, 1997
- Appointed by: Jean Chrétien

Personal details
- Born: July 5, 1922 St. Peters Bay, Prince Edward Island, Canada
- Died: October 16, 2022 (aged 100) Kings County, Prince Edward Island, Canada
- Party: Liberal
- Education: Acadia University (BSc, 1944); Cornell University (MSc, 1951)

Doris Margaret Anderson CM (July 5, 1922 – October 16, 2022) was a Canadian nutritionist and politician who served as a senator.

Anderson was born at St. Peters Bay, Prince Edward Island, the daughter of William W. and Florence (née MacSwain) Anderson. She attended Prince of Wales College, Acadia University and Cornell University where she earned bachelor's and masters's degrees and was a nutritionist and educator by career. Her thesis in 1951 was entitled A History of Celiac Disease with Special Emphasis on Theories of Etiology and Treatment.

From 1948 to 1966, she was employed at Prince of Wales College in the home economics department, first as a lecturer, eventually rising to become an associate professor and department chair. She later served as a professor of home economics (1969–1980) and nutrition at the University of Prince Edward Island (1980–1988) before becoming professor emeritus in 1994. Anderson also worked with the Government of Prince Edward Island in the department of health. In 1995, Anderson was appointed to the Senate by Jean Chrétien, representing the senatorial division of St. Peter's, Kings County, Prince Edward Island. She retired at the mandatory age of 75 in 1997. She was a member of the Liberal caucus.

In 1982, she was made a Member of the Order of Canada in recognition of having been able to "help many children suffering from celiac disease and to contribute to education and mental health in her province".

Anderson died in Kings County, Prince Edward Island, on October 16, 2022, at the age of 100.
