= Joseph P. Landry =

Canadian politician (1922–2008)

The Honourable Joseph P. Landry
- Born: Joseph Gérard Lauri P. Landry; June 19, 1922
- Died: July 25, 2008 (aged 86)

Joseph Gérard Lauri P. Landry (June 19, 1922 – July 25, 2008) was a Liberal Canadian senator and entrepreneur.

He established Cape Bald Packers, a lobster processing plant in Cap-Pelé, New Brunswick, in 1948. Starting off as a medium-sized business employing 30 people, the company continued to grow to where it now utilizes five Atlantic coast facilities and employs more than 1,000 people.

In 1982, he established Les Plastiques Downeast Plastics, which produces polystyrene products for the aquaculture industry.

In 1996, Landry was appointed to the Senate by Jean Chrétien.

== Awards ==
- 2001 Ernst & Young Atlantic Entrepreneur of the Year Trophy
- 1999, the Province of New Brunswick honored him with its Excellence Award in recognition of his practice of employing individuals with disabilities
- 1983 The Commission économique du Sud-Est awarded its Certificate of Merit to Cape Bald Packers.
