= Normand Grimard =

French Canadian lawyer and politician

The Honourable Normand Grimard QC

Senator for Québec, Quebec
- In office September 27, 1990 – June 16, 2000
- Appointed by: Brian Mulroney

Personal details
- Born: June 16, 1925 Rigaud, Quebec, Canada
- Died: December 28, 2017 (aged 92) Rouyn-Noranda, Quebec, Canada
- Party: Progressive Conservative

Normand Grimard, QC (June 16, 1925 – December 28, 2017) was a French Canadian lawyer and politician.

Born in Rigaud, Quebec, he received a Bachelor of Arts degree from St. Joseph Seminary, Trois-Rivières in 1946 and a Bachelor of Civil Law degree in 1949 from Laval University. He was called to the Quebec Bar in 1949 and was created a Queen's Counsel in 1959. A practicing lawyer, he worked in mining law at the Chambre de commerce du Québec.

In a 1977 by-election and the 1979 federal elections, he ran unsuccessfully as the Progressive Conservative candidate for the House of Commons of Canada in the Quebec riding of Témiscamingue.

In 1990, he was summoned to the Senate of Canada on the advice of Prime Minister Brian Mulroney. Mulroney used a little-known constitutional provision to increase the number of senators by eight temporarily, thus giving the Progressive Conservatives a majority in the upper chamber needed to pass the Goods and Services Tax legislation. A Progressive Conservative, he represented the senatorial division of Quebec until he retired in 2000. He was Deputy Chair of the Standing Committee - Privileges, Standing Rules and Orders.

He was the author of L'indispensable Sénat: défense d'une institution mal aimée, a book in which he defended the existence of the Senate.
