= William McDonough Kelly =

Canadian politician

The Honourable William McDonough Kelly CLJ

Canadian Senator from Ontario
- In office December 23, 1982 – July 21, 2000
- Appointed by: Pierre Elliott Trudeau

Personal details
- Born: July 21, 1925 Georgetown, Ontario, Canada
- Died: November 16, 2013 (aged 88) Toronto, Ontario, Canada
- Party: Progressive Conservative
- Committees: Chair, Special Committee on Terrorism and Public Safety (1986–1991); Chair, Standing Committee of Selection (1991–1993); Chair, Special Committee on Security and Intelligence (1997–1999)
- Portfolio: Government Whip in the Senate (1991–1993)

William McDonough Kelly, CLJ (July 21, 1925 – November 16, 2013) was a Canadian political strategist and Senator.

== Background ==
Kelly was a civil engineer by training and a consultant in the energy industry by profession. Politically he was a member of the Big Blue Machine, a group of advisers, organizers and strategists around Ontario Premier Bill Davis and the Progressive Conservative Party of Ontario in the 1970s and 1980s.

He was appointed to the Senate in 1982 by Liberal Prime Minister Pierre Elliott Trudeau. At the time, the Liberals had been in power for almost all of the previous twenty years resulting in a steady decline in the number of Tory senators. Trudeau adopted a policy of replacing retiring Progressive Conservative Senators with other Progressive Conservatives in order to ensure the opposition caucus was large enough to be functional.

The Leader of the Official Opposition would submit a short list of names from which the Prime Minister would choose an appointee for a vacant Tory Senate seat. Several senior Red Tories such as Joe Clark's chief of staff, Peter Harder as well as Norman Atkins, Hugh Segal (all three became Senators later) and Bill Davis himself lobbied Clark to include Kelly on the short list and lobbied the Prime Minister's Office to choose Kelly from the list.

As a Senator, Kelly served variously as caucus chairman and whip and served on various Senate committees, most notably as Chair of the Special Senate Committee on Security and Intelligence and the Special Senate Committee on Terrorism and the Public Safety. In the 1990s Kelly served as rapporteur and delegate on the second committee to the OSCE Parliamentary Assembly in Vienna. His Senate tenure was also notable for his having introduced a procedural intervention that succeeded in putting an end to the filibuster and the passing of the GST (Goods and Services Tax) bill in late 1990s. On his mandatory retirement from the Senate in 2000, Senate colleagues of both parties in the Senate lauded his distaste for partisanship and gentlemanly attributes.

== World War II ==
During World War II, Kelly served as a lieutenant, of the Second Field Engineer Regiment.

== Affiliations/honours ==
Kelly also served as a director of the Council on Drug Abuse, chairman of the Board of Governors at Ryerson Polytechnic University and co-chairman of a 1984 task force on Crown corporations. He also served for a period as Chairman of the Board of Rothmans Benson & Hedges Inc. He was a director of numerous national and international companies and financial institutions, governor of the Canadian Sports Hall of Fame and a commander of the Order of St. Lazarus of Jerusalem (CLJ).

== Sources ==
- Tributes to William Kelly on his retirement from the Senate, Hansard, June 20, 2000
