= Guy Charbonneau =

Canadian politician (1922–1998)

The Honourable Guy Charbonneau PC

Speaker of the Senate of Canada
- In office November 2, 1984 – December 6, 1993
- Nominated by: Brian Mulroney
- Appointed by: Jeanne Sauvé
- Preceded by: Maurice Riel
- Succeeded by: Roméo LeBlanc

Senator for Kennebec, Quebec
- In office September 27, 1979 – June 21, 1997
- Appointed by: Joe Clark
- Preceded by: Claude Wagner
- Succeeded by: Serge Joyal

Personal details
- Born: June 21, 1922 Trois-Rivières, Quebec, Canada
- Died: January 18, 1998 (aged 75)
- Party: Progressive Conservative

Guy Charbonneau PC (June 21, 1922 – January 18, 1998) was a Canadian senator who was the longest serving Speaker of the Canadian Senate, serving from 1984 to 1993. During his tenure, amendments to the Standing Orders of the Senate extended the powers of the speaker.

Chabonneau was born in Trois-Rivières, Quebec. He received his Bachelor of Arts from the Université de Montréal, and pursued further studies in economics at McGill University. He served during World War II in the Royal Canadian Air Force.

After being demobilized, he joined the insurance industry. He rose to the position of vice-president and director of Peerless Insurance Agencies in 1948. He became president in 1963. He later was chief executive officer of the firm of Charbonneau, Dulude and Associates Ltd., Insurance Brokers, and became a limited partner in the Mer Banco Group of Calgary. Charbonneau was on the board of directors of Canadian National Railway from 1961 to 1964.

He was summoned to the Senate on September 27, 1979 on the advice of Prime Minister Joe Clark, and sat as a Progressive Conservative. When Brian Mulroney became prime minister following the 1984 federal election, he recommended Charbonneau for the position of Speaker.

During much of Charbonneau's tenure, the Liberal Party held a majority in the Senate, despite the fact that the Progressive Conservatives formed the government, due to their majority in the House of Commons. This resulted in a number of occasions where the Senate defeated or delayed legislation passed by the House of Commons – a relatively rare occurrence in Canadian politics.

Opposition to the introduction of the Goods and Services Tax in 1990 resulted in Prime Minister Mulroney using a never-before-utilized section of the Constitution of Canada that allowed him to recommend to the Queen the appointment of eight additional Senators (two per region) beyond the usual maximum number of occupants of the upper chamber. This extraordinary appointment gave the Progressive Conservatives control of the Senate for the first time in decades. The measure resulted in an especially tumultuous debate in the usually staid upper house, providing a challenge to Charbonneau to maintain decorum.

This resulted in what opposition parties and outsiders viewed as abuses of his power as Speaker, including locking the Opposition out of voting sessions, turning off the bells that call Senators to votes, ramming through motions without debate, moving for divisions without the presence of Party Whips, and actually voting himself on many motions to help them carry.

In June 1991, the Senate adopted a major overhaul to the standing rules of the Senate giving the Speaker of the Senate powers more consistent with those of the Speaker of the Canadian House of Commons, previously the Senate Speaker enjoyed far less control over the upper house.

Charbonneau stepped down as Speaker following the defeat of the Progressive Conservatives in the 1993 federal election. As is customary for former Speakers, he was elevated to the Queen's Privy Council for Canada (in 1996). He retired from the Senate in 1997 upon reaching the mandatory retirement age of 75.

== Sources ==
- Official Biography
- Guy Charbonneau fonds, Library and Archives Canada
