= Philip D. Lewis =

Canadian politician

The Honourable Philip Lewis QC

Member of the Senate of Canada for St. John's, Newfoundland and Labrador
- In office 23 March 1978 – 28 November 1999

Personal details
- Born: Philip Derek Lewis; 28 November 1924 St. John's, Newfoundland, British Empire
- Died: 19 January 2017 (aged 92) St. John's, Newfoundland and Labrador, Canada
- Party: Liberal
- Profession: Lawyer

Philip Derek Lewis (28 November 1924 – 19 January 2017) was a Canadian politician who served in the Senate of Canada from 1978 to 1999. Lewis was a lawyer by profession.

He was nominated to the Senate by Prime Minister Pierre Trudeau under the St. John's, Newfoundland division. Lewis was a member of the Liberal party. He died in 2017, aged 92.
