= Sheila Finestone =

Canadian politician (1927–2009)

The Honourable Sheila Finestone PC

Senator for Montarville, Quebec
- In office August 11, 1999 – January 28, 2002
- Appointed by: Jean Chrétien
- Preceded by: Dalia Wood
- Succeeded by: Raymond Lavigne

Member of Parliament for Mount Royal
- In office September 4, 1984 – August 11, 1999
- Preceded by: Pierre Trudeau
- Succeeded by: Irwin Cotler

Personal details
- Born: Sheila Abbey; January 28, 1927 Montreal, Quebec, Canada
- Died: June 8, 2009 (aged 82) Ottawa, Ontario, Canada
- Resting place: Montreal, Quebec, Canada
- Party: Liberal
- Education: McGill University
- Cabinet: Secretary of State (Multiculturalism) (Status of Women) (1993-1996)

Sheila Abbey Finestone PC (January 28, 1927 – June 8, 2009) was a Canadian Member of Parliament for Mount Royal and Senator from Montarville, Quebec.

== Early life ==
Born in Montreal, Quebec, the daughter of Minnie Cummings Abbey and Monroe Abbey, a lawyer and onetime president of The Canadian Jewish Congress. She was the niece of Nathan Cummings and Maxwell Cummings. Sheila received a Bachelor of Science degree from McGill University in 1947 and married Alan Finestone (1923–1997). They had four sons: David (born 1950), Peter (born 1951), Maxwell (born 1954) and Stephen (born 1956).

== Career ==
From 1977 to 1980, Finestone was president of the Fédération des femmes du Québec. In 1984 she was elected as a Liberal Member of Parliament for the Montreal riding of Mount Royal. She was reelected in the 1988, 1993 and 1997 elections.

Finestone was sworn to the Privy Council in November 1993 as Secretary of State (Multiculturalism and Status of Women). She was appointed to the Senate of Canada in August 1999 and left in 2002 at the mandatory retirement age of 75. She was a board member of the Canadian Landmine Foundation.

=== Award ===
In 2008, Finestone won the Distinguished Service Award of the Canadian Association of Former Parliamentarians, "presented annually to a former parliamentarian who has made an outstanding contribution to the country and its democratic institutions". Finestone was unable to attend due to illness, so her son Peter accepted on her behalf.

== Death ==
Finestone died of cancer on June 8, 2009, in Ottawa.

26th Canadian Ministry (1993–2003) – Cabinet of Jean Chrétien
Sub-Cabinet Post
Predecessor	Title	Successor
	Secretary of State (Multiculturalism) (Status of Women) (1993–1996)	Hedy Fry
