= List of senators in the 39th Parliament of Canada =

This is a list of members of the Senate of Canada in the 39th Parliament of Canada.

At dissolution on September 7, 2008, there were 15 vacancies in the Senate: three each in British Columbia, Nova Scotia, and Quebec; two in Ontario; and each one in Newfoundland and Labrador, New Brunswick, Prince Edward Island, and Yukon. The resignation of Michael Fortier on September 7, 2008, subsequently created a 16th vacancy (4th in Quebec) on September 8.

The province of Quebec has 24 Senate divisions which are constitutionally mandated. In all other provinces, a Senate division is strictly an optional designation of the senator's own choosing, and has no real constitutional or legal standing. A senator who does not choose a special senate division is designated a senator for the province at large.

Names in bold indicate senators that served in the 28th Canadian Ministry.

== List of senators ==
=== Senators at the beginning of the 39th Parliament ===
Name	Party	Province (Division)	Date appointed	Appointed by	Left office	Reason
Willie Adams	Liberal	Nunavut	April 5, 1977	Trudeau	June 22, 2009	Retirement
Raynell Andreychuk	Conservative	Saskatchewan	March 11, 1993	Mulroney	August 14, 2019	Retirement
W. David Angus	Conservative	Québec (Alma)	June 10, 1993	Mulroney	July 21, 2012	Retirement
Norman Atkins	Progressive Conservative	Ontario (Markham)	July 2, 1986	Mulroney	June 27, 2009	Retirement
Jack Austin	Liberal	British Columbia (Vancouver South)	August 19, 1975	Trudeau	March 2, 2007	Retirement
Lise Bacon	Liberal	Québec (De la Durantaye)	September 15, 1994	Chrétien	August 25, 2009	Retirement
George Baker	Liberal	Newfoundland and Labrador	March 26, 2002	Chrétien	September 4, 2017	Retirement
Tommy Banks	Liberal	Alberta (Edmonton)	April 7, 2000	Chrétien	December 17, 2011	Retirement
Marisa Ferretti Barth	Liberal	Québec (Repentigny)	September 23, 1997	Chrétien	April 28, 2006	Retirement
Michel Biron	Liberal	Québec (Mille Isles)	October 4, 2001	Chrétien	March 16, 2009	Retirement
John G. Bryden	Liberal	New Brunswick	November 23, 1994	Chrétien	October 31, 2009	Resignation
John MacLellan Buchanan	Conservative	Nova Scotia (Halifax)	September 12, 1990	Mulroney	April 22, 2006	Retirement
Catherine Callbeck	Liberal	Prince Edward Island	September 23, 1997	Chrétien	July 25, 2014	Retirement
Larry Campbell	Liberal	British Columbia (Vancouver)	August 2, 2005	Martin	Incumbent	
Patricia Carney	Conservative	British Columbia	August 30, 1990	Mulroney	January 31, 2008	Resignation
Sharon Carstairs	Liberal	Manitoba	September 15, 1994	Chrétien	October 17, 2011	Resignation
Andrée Champagne	Conservative	Quebec (Grandville)	August 2, 2005	Martin	July 17, 2014	Retirement
Maria Chaput	Liberal	Manitoba	December 12, 2002	Chrétien	March 1, 2016	Resignation
Ione Jean Christensen	Liberal	Yukon	September 2, 1999	Chrétien	December 31, 2006	Resignation
Ethel M. Cochrane	Conservative	Newfoundland and Labrador	November 17, 1986	Mulroney	September 23, 2012	Retirement
Gerald J. Comeau	Conservative	Nova Scotia	August 30, 1990	Mulroney	November 30, 2013	Resignation
Joan Cook	Liberal	Newfoundland and Labrador	March 6, 1998	Chrétien	October 6, 2009	Retirement
Anne Claire Cools	Conservative	Ontario (Toronto-Centre-York)	January 13, 1984	Trudeau	August 12, 2018	Retirement
Eymard Georges Corbin	Liberal	New Brunswick (Grand-Sault)	July 9, 1984	Turner	August 2, 2009	Retirement
Jane Marie Cordy	Liberal	Nova Scotia	June 9, 2000	Chrétien	Incumbent	
Jim Cowan	Liberal	Nova Scotia (Halifax)	March 24, 2005	Martin	January 22, 2017	Retirement
Roméo Dallaire	Liberal	Quebec (Gulf)	March 24, 2005	Martin	June 17, 2014	Resignation
Dennis Dawson	Liberal	Quebec (Lauzon)	August 2, 2005	Martin	Incumbent	
Joseph A. Day	Liberal	New Brunswick (Saint John-Kennebecasis)	October 4, 2001	Chrétien	Incumbent	
Pierre de Bané	Liberal	Québec (De la Vallière)	June 29, 1984	Trudeau	August 2, 2013	Retirement
Consiglio Di Nino	Conservative	Ontario	August 30, 1990	Mulroney	June 30, 2012	Resignation
Percy Downe	Liberal	Prince Edward Island (Charlottetown)	June 26, 2003	Chrétien	Incumbent	
Lillian Dyck	New Democratic Party	Saskatchewan (North Battleford)	March 24, 2005	Martin	Incumbent	
Art Eggleton	Liberal	Ontario (Toronto)	March 24, 2005	Martin	September 29, 2018	Retirement
John Trevor Eyton	Conservative	Ontario	September 23, 1990	Mulroney	July 12, 2009	Retirement
Joyce Fairbairn	Liberal	Alberta (Lethbridge)	June 29, 1984	Trudeau	January 18, 2013	Resignation
D. Ross Fitzpatrick	Liberal	British Columbia (Okanagan-Similkameen)	March 6, 1998	Chrétien	February 4, 2008	Retirement
Michael Forrestall	Conservative	Nova Scotia (Dartmouth/Eastern Shore)	September 27, 1990	Mulroney	June 8, 2006	Death
Francis Fox	Liberal	Québec (Rigaud)	August 29, 2005	Martin	December 2, 2011	Resignation
Joan Fraser	Liberal	Québec (De Lorimier)	September 17, 1998	Chrétien	February 2, 2018	Resignation
George Furey	Liberal	Newfoundland and Labrador	August 11, 1999	Chrétien	May 12, 2023	Retirement
Aurélien Gill	Liberal	Québec (Wellington)	September 17, 1998	Chrétien	August 26, 2008	Retirement
Yoine Goldstein	Liberal	Québec (Rigaud)	August 29, 2005	Martin	May 11, 2009	Retirement
Jerry Grafstein	Liberal	Ontario (Metro Toronto)	January 13, 1984	Trudeau	January 2, 2010	Retirement
Lenard Joe Gustafson	Conservative	Saskatchewan	May 26, 1993	Mulroney	November 10, 2008	Retirement
Mac Harb	Liberal	Ontario	September 9, 2003	Chrétien	August 26, 2013	Resignation
Daniel Philip Hays^{3}	Liberal	Alberta (Calgary)	June 29, 1984	Trudeau	June 30, 2007	Resignation
Céline Hervieux-Payette^{4}	Liberal	Québec (Bedford)	March 21, 1995	Chrétien	April 22, 2016	Retirement
Libbe Hubley	Liberal	Prince Edward Island	March 8, 2001	Chrétien	September 8, 2017	Retirement
Mobina Jaffer	Liberal	British Columbia	June 13, 2001	Chrétien	Incumbent	
Janis Gudrun Johnson	Conservative	Manitoba (Winnipeg - Interlake)	September 27, 1990	Mulroney	September 27, 2016	Resignation
Serge Joyal	Liberal	Québec (Kennebec)	November 26, 1997	Chrétien	Incumbent	
Colin Kenny	Liberal	Ontario (Rideau)	June 29, 1984	Trudeau	February 2, 2018	Resignation
Wilbert Joseph Keon	Conservative	Ontario (Ottawa)	September 27, 1990	Mulroney	May 17, 2010	Retirement
Noël A. Kinsella	Conservative	New Brunswick (Fredericton-York-Sunbury)	September 12, 1990	Mulroney	November 27, 2014	Retirement
Michael J. L. Kirby	Liberal	Nova Scotia (South Shore)	January 13, 1984	Trudeau	October 31, 2006	Resignation
Jean Lapointe	Liberal	Québec (Saurel)	June 13, 2001	Chrétien	December 6, 2010	Retirement
Raymond Lavigne	Liberal	Québec (Montarville)	March 26, 2002	Chrétien	March 21, 2011	Resignation
**Marjory LeBreton**	**Conservative**	**Ontario**	**June 18, 1993**	**Mulroney**	**July 4, 2015**	**Retirement**
Rose-Marie Losier-Cool	Liberal	New Brunswick (Tracadie)	March 21, 1995	Chrétien	June 18, 2012	Retirement
Sandra Lovelace Nicholas	Liberal	New Brunswick	September 21, 2005	Martin	Incumbent	
Shirley Maheu	Liberal	Québec (Rougemont)	February 1, 1996	Chrétien	February 1, 2006	Death
Francis William Mahovlich	Liberal	Ontario	June 11, 1998	Chrétien	January 10, 2013	Retirement
Paul J. Massicotte	Liberal	Québec (De Lanaudière)	June 26, 2003	Chrétien	Incumbent	
Elaine McCoy	Progressive Conservative	Alberta (Calgary)	March 24, 2005	Martin	Incumbent	
Michael Arthur Meighen	Conservative	Ontario (St. Marys)	September 27, 1990	Mulroney	February 6, 2012	Resignation
Terry M. Mercer	Liberal	Nova Scotia (Northend Halifax)	November 7, 2003	Chrétien	Incumbent	
Pana Merchant	Liberal	Saskatchewan	December 12, 2002	Chrétien	March 31, 2017	Resignation
Lorna Ann Milne	Liberal	Ontario (Peel County)	September 22, 1995	Chrétien	December 13, 2009	Retirement
Grant Mitchell	Liberal	Alberta (Edmonton)	March 24, 2005	Martin	Incumbent	
Wilfred P. Moore	Liberal	Nova Scotia (Stanhope St./Bluenose)	September 26, 1996	Chrétien	January 14, 2017	Retirement
Jim Munson	Liberal	Ontario (Ottawa/Rideau Canal)	December 10, 2003	Chrétien	Incumbent	
Lowell Murray	Progressive Conservative	Ontario (Pakenham)	September 13, 1979	Clark	September 26, 2011	Retirement
Pierre Claude Nolin	Conservative	Québec (De Salaberry)	June 18, 1993	Mulroney	April 23, 2015	Death
Donald H. Oliver	Conservative	Nova Scotia	September 7, 1990	Mulroney	November 16, 2013	Retirement
Lucie Pépin	Liberal	Québec (Shawinigan)	April 8, 1997	Chrétien	September 7, 2011	Retirement
Robert Peterson	Liberal	Saskatchewan (Regina)	March 24, 2005	Martin	October 19, 2012	Retirement
Gerard Phalen	Liberal	Nova Scotia	October 4, 2001	Chrétien	March 28, 2009	Retirement
Peter Michael Pitfield	Independent	Ontario (Ottawa-Vanier)	December 22, 1982	Trudeau	June 1, 2010	Resignation
Madeleine Plamondon	Independent	Québec (The Laurentides)	September 9, 2003	Chrétien	September 21, 2006	Retirement
Marie-Paule Poulin	Liberal	Ontario	September 22, 1995	Chrétien	April 17, 2015	Resignation
Vivienne Poy	Liberal	Ontario (Toronto)	September 17, 1998	Chrétien	September 17, 2012	Resignation
Marcel Prud'homme	Independent	Québec (La Salle)	May 26, 1993	Mulroney	November 30, 2009	Retirement
Pierrette Ringuette	Liberal	New Brunswick	December 12, 2002	Chrétien	Incumbent	
Jean-Claude Rivest	Independent	Québec (Stadacona)	March 11, 1993	Mulroney	January 31, 2015	Resignation
Fernand Robichaud	Liberal	New Brunswick (Saint Louis de Kent)	September 23, 1997	Chrétien	December 2, 2014	Retirement
William H. Rompkey	Liberal	Newfoundland and Labrador (North West River)	September 22, 1995	Chrétien	May 13, 2011	Retirement
Nancy Ruth	Progressive Conservative	Ontario (Toronto)	March 24, 2005	Martin	January 6, 2017	Retirement
Hugh Segal	Conservative	Ontario (Kingston)	August 2, 2005	Martin	June 15, 2014	Resignation
Nick Sibbeston	Liberal	Northwest Territories	September 2, 1999	Chrétien	November 21, 2017	Resignation
David Paul Smith	Liberal	Ontario (Cobourg)	June 25, 2002	Chrétien	May 16, 2016	Retirement
Mira Spivak	Independent	Manitoba (Manitoba)	November 17, 1986	Mulroney	July 12, 2009	Retirement
Gerry St. Germain	Conservative	British Columbia (Langley-Pemberton-Whistler)	June 23, 1993	Mulroney	November 6, 2012	Retirement
Peter Alan Stollery	Liberal	Ontario (Bloor & Yonge/Toronto)	July 2, 1981	Trudeau	November 29, 2010	Retirement
Terrance Richard Stratton	Conservative	Manitoba (Red River)	March 25, 1993	Mulroney	March 16, 2013	Retirement
Claudette Tardif	Liberal	Alberta (Edmonton)	March 24, 2005	Martin	February 2, 2018	Resignation
David Tkachuk	Conservative	Saskatchewan	June 8, 1993	Mulroney	Incumbent	
Marilyn Trenholme Counsell	Liberal	New Brunswick	September 9, 2003	Chrétien	October 22, 2008	Retirement
Charlie Watt	Liberal	Québec (Inkerman)	January 14, 1984	Trudeau	March 16, 2018	Resignation
Rod Zimmer	Liberal	Manitoba (Winnipeg)	August 2, 2005	Martin	August 2, 2013	Resignation

=== Senators appointed during the 39th Parliament ===
Name	Party	Province (Division)	Date appointed	Appointed by	On the Advice of	Left office	Reason
Bert Brown^{6}	Conservative	Alberta	July 10, 2007	Jean	Harper	March 22, 2013	Retirement
**Michael Fortier**^{7}	**Conservative**	**Quebec (Rougemont)**	**February 27, 2006**	**Jean**	**Harper**	**September 8, 2008**	**Resignation**

- Senators in bold were cabinet ministers during the 39th Parliament

^{3} Senator Hays served as Leader of the Opposition in the Senate until 18 January 2007.

^{4} Senator Hervieux-Payette was appointed as Leader of the Opposition in the Senate on 18 January 2007.

^{6} Appointed from the list of elected senators-in-waiting.

^{7} Appointed after the election but prior to the official start of the 39th Parliament.

=== Left Senate during the 39th Parliament ===
Date	Name	Party	Province	Details
February 1, 2006	Shirley Maheu^{1}	Liberal	Quebec	Died
April 22, 2006	John Buchanan	Conservative	Nova Scotia	Reached mandatory retirement age of 75
April 28, 2006	Marisa Ferretti Barth	Liberal	Quebec	Reached mandatory retirement age of 75
June 8, 2006	Michael Forrestall	Conservative	Nova Scotia	Died
September 21, 2006	Madeleine Plamondon	Independent	Quebec	Reached mandatory retirement age of 75
October 31, 2006	Michael Kirby	Liberal	Nova Scotia	Resigned to move on to new challenges
December 31, 2006	Ione Jean Christensen	Liberal	Yukon	Resigned to assist her ailing husband
March 2, 2007	Jack Austin	Liberal	British Columbia	Reached mandatory retirement age of 75
June 30, 2007	Daniel Philip Hays	Liberal	Alberta	Resigned
January 31, 2008	Pat Carney	Conservative	British Columbia	Resigned
February 4, 2008	Ross Fitzpatrick	Liberal	British Columbia	Reached mandatory retirement age of 75
August 26, 2008	Aurelien Gill	Liberal	Quebec	Reached mandatory retirement age of 75
September 8, 2008	Michael Fortier	Conservative	Quebec	Resigned to run in 2008 election.

^{1} Died after the election but prior to the official start of the 39th Parliament.

=== Changes in party affiliation during the 39th Parliament ===
Date	Name	Party (subsequent)	Party (previous)	Details
March 29, 2006	Nancy Ruth^{1}	Conservative	Progressive Conservative	Appointed after the two parties merged, she originally listed her affiliation as Progressive Conservative
June 8, 2006	Raymond Lavigne	Liberal without caucus	Liberal	Suspended from the caucus for allegedly spending Senate funds for personal use. After being remove he continued to sit as a Liberal without caucus.
October 31, 2006	Lillian Dyck	Independent NDP	New Democrat	Dyck originally listed her official affiliation as NDP, but when this was not recognized by the party she changed her affiliation
June 22, 2007	Anne Cools	Conservative without caucus	Conservative	Removed from caucus for speaking out against the budget
December 13, 2007	Anne Cools	Non-aligned	Conservative without caucus	Changed to non-aligned in the standings

^{1} Changed after the election but prior to the official start of the 39th Parliament.

== Party standings since election ==
The party standings have changed as follows since the election preceding the 39th Parliament:

Number of members per party by date	2006										2007					2008			
Number of members per party by date	Jan 23	Feb 1	Feb 27	Mar 29	Apr 22	Apr 28	Jun 8	Sep 21	Oct 31	Dec 31	Mar 2	Jun 22	Jun 30	Jul 10	Dec 13	Jan 31	Feb 4	Aug 26	Sep 8
Liberal	67	66				65	64		63	62	61		60				59	58	
Conservative	23		24	25	24		23					22		23		22			21
Independent	5							4											
Progressive Conservative	4			3															
NDP	1								0										
Independent NDP	0								1										
Non-aligned	0														1				
Conservative without caucus	0											1			0				
Liberal without caucus	0						1												
vacant	5	6	5		6	7	8	9	10	11	12		13	12		13	14	15	16

== See also ==
- List of House members of the 39th Parliament of Canada
- Women in the 39th Canadian Parliament
- List of current Canadian senators
