= 38th Canadian Parliament =

2004–05 legislative term

- minority parliament
- Oct. 4, 2004 – Nov. 29, 2005

Parliament leaders
- Prime minister: Rt. Hon. Paul Martin; Dec. 12, 2003 – Feb. 6, 2006
- Cabinet: 27th Canadian Ministry
- Leader of the Opposition: Hon. Stephen Harper; March 20, 2004 – February 6, 2006

Party caucuses
- Government: Liberal Party
- Opposition: Conservative Party
- Recognized: Bloc Québécois
- New Democratic Party
- Unrecognized: Progressive Conservative*
- * Only in the Senate.

House of Commons
- Seating arrangements of the House of Commons
- Speaker of the Commons: Hon. Peter Milliken; January 29, 2001 – June 2, 2011
- Government House leader: Hon. Tony Valeri; October 4, 2004 – November 29, 2005
- Opposition House leader: Hon. John Douglas Reynolds; October 4, 2004 – January 27, 2005
- Jay D. Hill; January 30, 2005 – November 29, 2005
- Members: 308 seats MP seats List of members

Senate
- Seating arrangements of the Senate
- Speaker of the Senate: Hon. Dan Hays; October 4, 2004 – February 6, 2006
- Government Senate leader: Hon. Jacob Austin; October 4, 2004 – February 6, 2006
- Opposition Senate leader: Hon. Noël Kinsella; October 4, 2004 – February 6, 2006
- Senators: 105 seats senator seats List of senators

Sovereign
- Monarch: HM Elizabeth II; 6 February 1952 – 8 September 2022
- Governor general: HE Rt. Hon. Adrienne Clarkson; October 7, 1999 – September 27, 2005
- HE Rt. Hon. Michaëlle Jean; September 27, 2005 – October 1, 2010

Sessions
- 1st session October 4, 2004 – November 29, 2005
← 37th	→ 39th

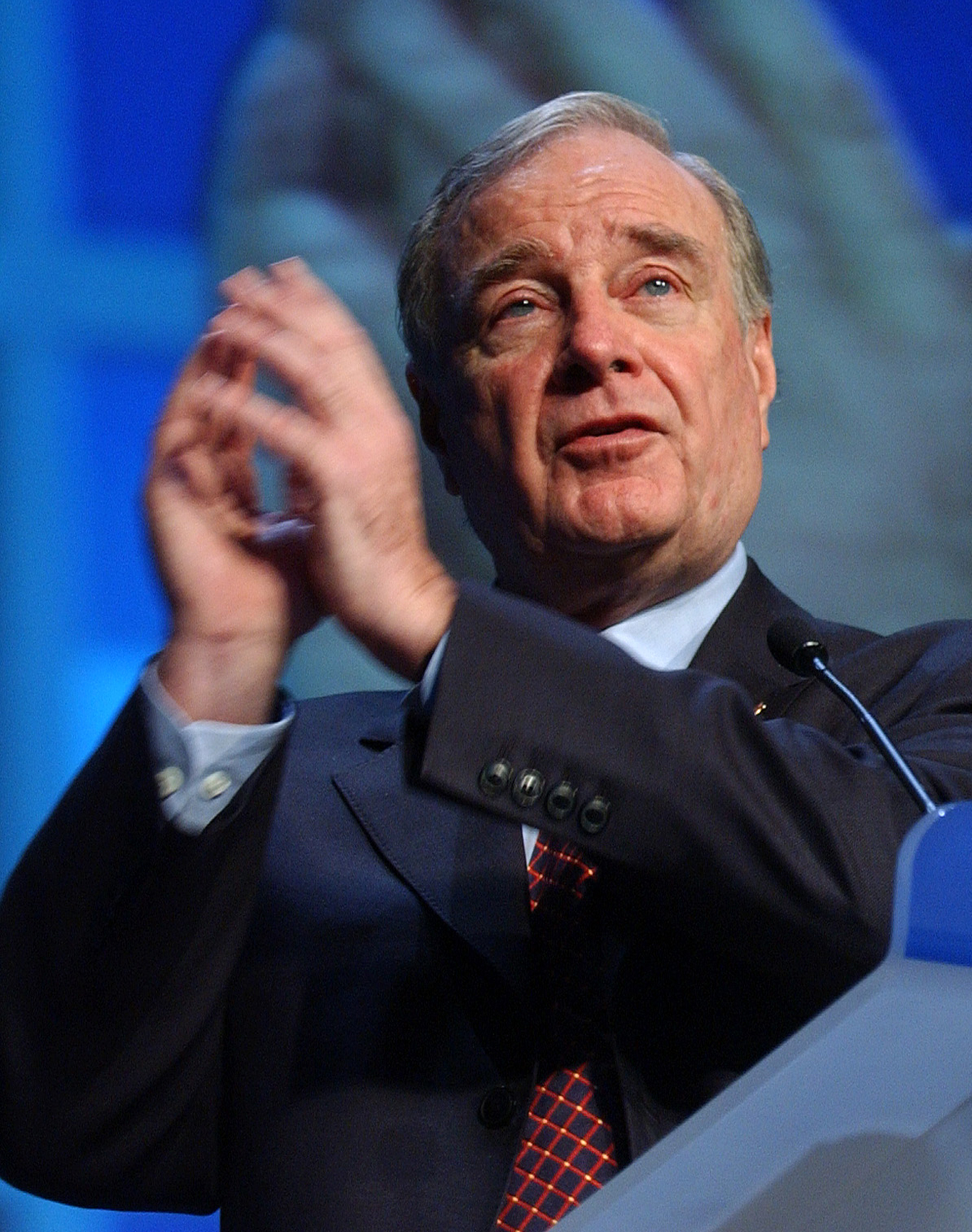
Paul Martin was Prime Minister during the 38th Canadian Parliament.

The 38th Canadian Parliament was in session from October 4, 2004, until November 29, 2005. The membership was set by the 2004 federal election on June 28, 2004, and it changed only somewhat due to resignations and by-elections, but due to the seat distribution, those few changes significantly affected the distribution of power. It was dissolved prior to the 2006 election.

There was one session of the 38th Parliament:

Session	Start	End
1st	October 4, 2004	November 29, 2005

== Overview ==
The 38th Canadian Parliament was controlled by a Liberal Party minority under Prime Minister Paul Martin and the 27th Canadian Ministry. The Official Opposition was the Conservative Party, led by Stephen Harper.

The Speaker was Peter Milliken. See also List of Canadian federal electoral districts for a list of the ridings in this parliament.

== Party standings ==
The party standings as of the election and as of dissolution were as follows:

Affiliation	House members		Senate members	
Affiliation	2004 election results	At dissolution	On election day 2004	At dissolution
Liberal	135	133	64	67
Conservative	99	98	25	23
Bloc Québécois	54	53	0	0
New Democratic	19	18	0	1
Independent	1	4	4	5
Senate PC	0	0	3	5
Total members	308	306	96	101
Vacant	0	2	9	4
Total seats	308		105	

== Major events ==
The parliament was dissolved following a vote of non-confidence passed on 28 November by the opposition Conservatives, supported by the New Democratic Party and Bloc Québécois. Consequently, a federal election was held on 23 January 2006 to choose the next parliament.

== Legislation and motions ==
Important bills of the 38th parliament included:

- Bill C-32 – the Department of Foreign Affairs Act to split DFAIT in two departments, was a surprise defeat for the government
- Bill C-38 – the Civil Marriage Act, legalized Same-sex marriage across Canada.
- Bill C-43 – the Canadian federal budget, 2005
- Bill C-48 – an NDP add-on to the 2005 budget

Complete list of bills

== Ministry ==
The 27th Canadian Ministry was formed during the 37th Canadian Parliament and lasted for the entirety of the 28th Parliament.

== Officeholders ==
=== Head of State ===
Office	Photo	Name	Assumed office	Left office
Sovereign		Elizabeth II	February 6, 1952	September 8, 2022
Governor General		Adrienne Clarkson	October 7, 1999	September 27, 2005
Governor General		Michaëlle Jean	September 27, 2005	October 1, 2010

=== Party leadership ===
Party	Photo	Name	Assumed Office	Left Office
Liberal		Paul Martin	November 14, 2003	March 19, 2006
Conservative		Stephen Harper	March 20, 2004	October 19, 2015
Bloc Québécois		Gilles Duceppe	March 15, 1997	May 2, 2011
New Democratic		Jack Layton	January 25, 2003	August 22, 2011

=== House of Commons ===
==== Presiding officer ====
Office	Photo	Party	Officer	Riding	Assumed office	Left office
Speaker of the House of Commons		Liberal	Hon. Peter Milliken	Kingston and the Islands	January 29, 2001	June 2, 2011

==== Government leadership (Liberal) ====
Office	Photo	Member	Riding
Prime Minister of Canada		Rt. Hon. Paul Martin	LaSalle—Émard
Government House Leader		Hon. Tony Valeri	Hamilton East—Stoney Creek
Deputy Speaker and Chair of Committees of the Whole		Hon Chuck Strahl	Chilliwack-Fraser Canyon
Deputy Chair of Committees of the Whole		Marcel Proulx	Hull—Aylmer
Assistant Deputy Chair of Committees of the Whole		Jean Augustine	Etobicoke—Lakeshore
Chief Government Whip		Hon. Karen Redman	Kitchener Centre

==== Opposition leadership (Conservative) ====
Office	Member		Riding
Leader of the Opposition	Hon. Stephen Harper		Calgary West
Opposition House Leader	January 27, 2005	Hon. John Douglas Reynolds	West Vancouver—Sunshine Coast
Opposition House Leader	January 30, 2005 -	Jay D. Hill	Prince George—Peace River
Whip	January 27, 2005	Jay D. Hill	Prince George—Peace River
Whip	January 28, 2005 -	Hon. Robert Douglas Nicholson	West Vancouver—Sunshine Coast

==== BLOC Leadership ====
Office	Member	Riding
Leader	Gilles Duceppe	Laurier—Sainte-Marie
House leader	Michel Gauthier	Roberval—Lac-Saint-Jean
Whip	Michel Guimond	Montmorency—Charlevoix—Haute-Côte-Nord

==== NDP Leadership ====
Office	Member	Riding
Leader	Hon. Jack Layton	Toronto—Danforth
House leader	Libby Davies	Vancouver East
Whip	Yvon Godin	Acadie—Bathurst

=== Senate ===
Office	Member	Party	Province
Speaker of the Senate	Hon. Daniel Hays	Liberal	Alberta
Speaker Pro Tempore	Hon. Shirley Maheu	Liberal	Quebec
Leader of the Government in the Senate	Hon. Jacob Austin	Liberal	British Columbia
Government Whip	Hon. Rose-Marie Losier-Cool	Liberal	New Brunswick
Office	Member	Party	Province
Leader of the Opposition in the Senate	Hon. Noël Kinsella	Conservative	New Brunswick
Opposition Whip	Hon. Marjory LeBreton	Conservative	Ontario

== Changes to Party Standings ==
=== Floor-crossings ===
In early 2005 Ontario Member of Parliament (MP) Belinda Stronach crossed the floor to the Liberal Party after running for Leader of the Conservative Party of Canada, and coming in second to Stephen Harper. She ended her public relationship with Conservative MP Peter MacKay.

=== By-elections ===
By-election	Date	Incumbent	Party	Winner	Party	Cause	Retained
Labrador	May 24, 2005	Lawrence D. O'Brien	Liberal	Todd Russell	Liberal	Death (cancer)	Yes

== See also ==
- List of Canadian federal electoral districts
- List of Canadian federal parliaments
