= 39th Canadian Parliament =

2006–08 legislative term

- Minority parliament
- Apr. 3, 2006 – Sep. 7, 2008
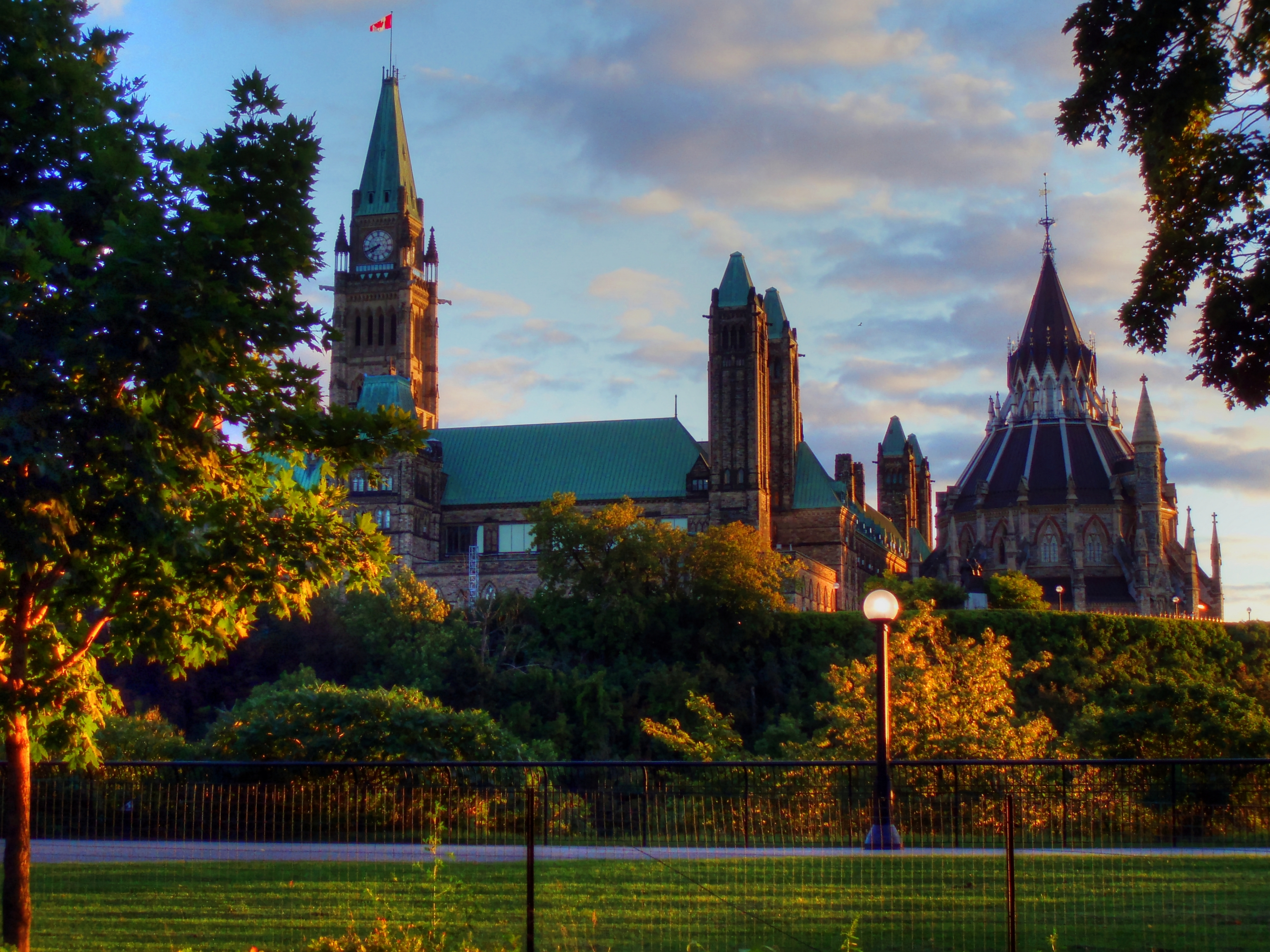
- Canadian Parliament (2008)

Parliament leaders
- Prime minister: Rt. Hon. Stephen Harper; Feb. 6, 2006 – Nov. 4, 2015
- Cabinet: 28th Canadian Ministry
- Leader of the Opposition: Hon. Bill Graham; Feb. 7, 2006 – Dec. 2, 2006
- Hon. Stéphane Dion; Dec. 2, 2006 – Dec. 10, 2008

Party caucuses
- Government: Conservative Party
- Opposition: Liberal Party
- Recognized: Bloc Québécois
- New Democratic Party
- Unrecognized: Green Party (from 2008)
- Progressive Conservative*
- * Only in the Senate.

House of Commons
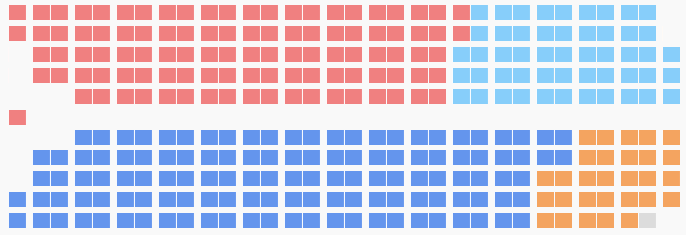
- Seating arrangements of the House of Commons
- Speaker of the Commons: Hon. Peter Milliken; January 29, 2001 – June 2, 2011
- Government House leader: Hon. Rob Nicholson; February 6, 2006 – January 4, 2007
- Hon. Peter Van Loan; January 4, 2007 – October 30, 2008
- Opposition House leader: Hon. Ralph Goodale; February 10, 2006 – September 6, 2010
- Members: 308 seats MP seats List of members

Senate
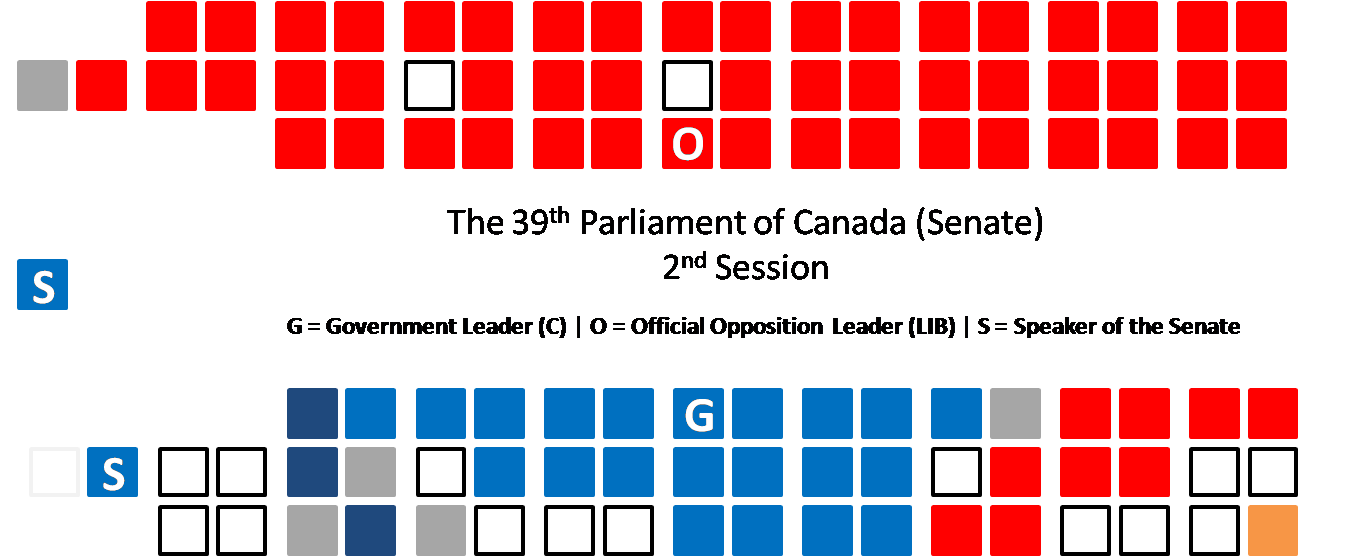
- Seating arrangements of the Senate
- Speaker of the Senate: Hon. Noël Kinsella; February 8, 2006 – November 26, 2014
- Government Senate leader: Hon. Marjory LeBreton; February 6, 2006 – July 14, 2013
- Opposition Senate leader: Hon. Dan Hays; February 8, 2006 – January 18, 2007
- Hon. Céline Hervieux-Payette; January 18, 2007 – November 3, 2008
- Senators: 105 seats senator seats List of senators

Sovereign
- Monarch: HM Elizabeth II; February 6, 1952 – 8 September 2022
- Governor general: HE Rt. Hon. Michaëlle Jean; September 27, 2005 – October 1, 2010

Sessions
- 1st session April 3, 2006 – September 14, 2007
- 2nd session October 16, 2007 – September 7, 2008
← 38th	→ 40th

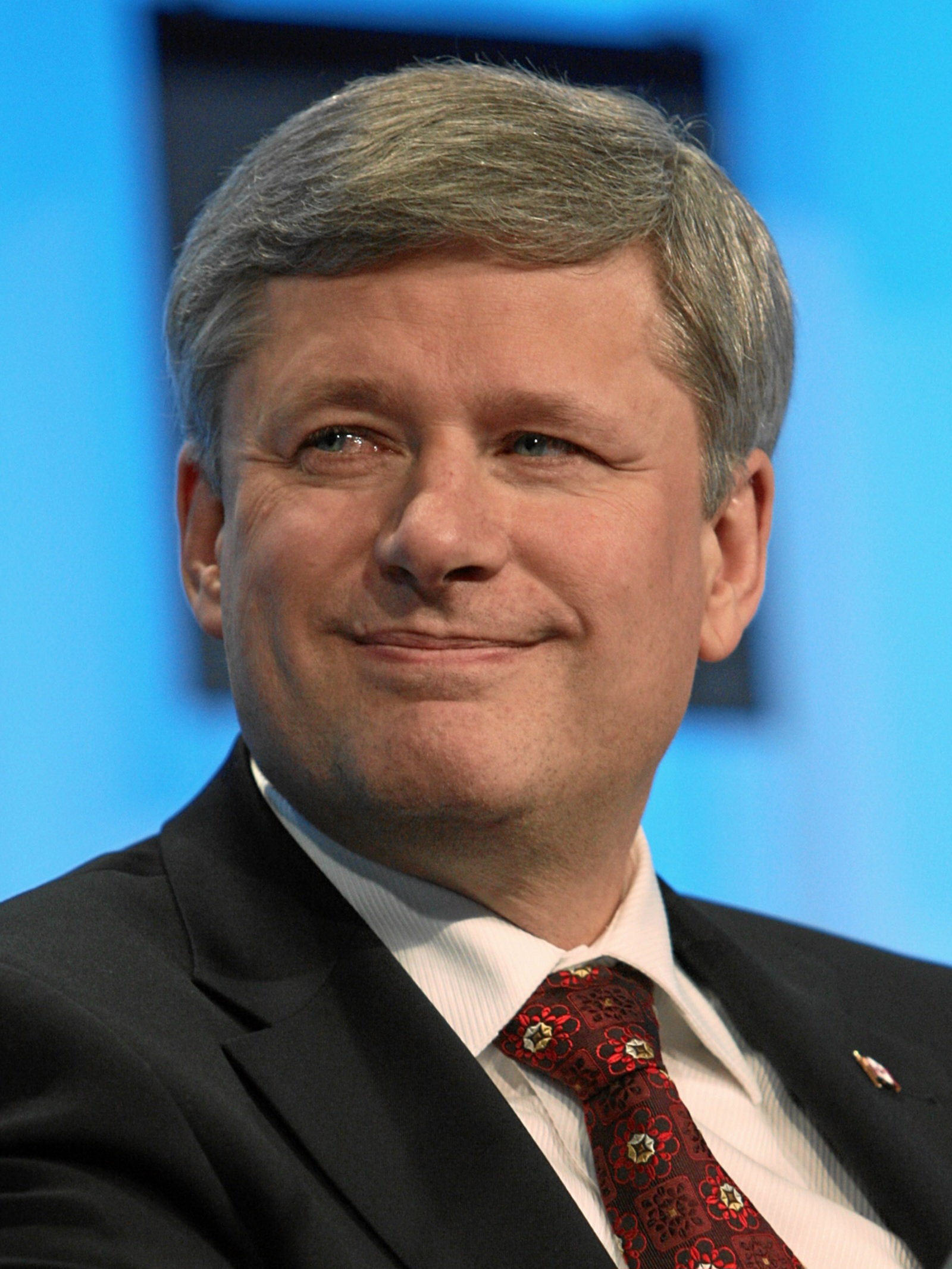
Stephen Harper was Prime Minister during the 39th Canadian Parliament.

The 39th Canadian Parliament was in session from April 3, 2006 until September 7, 2008. The membership was set by the 2006 federal election on January 23, 2006, and it changed only somewhat due to resignations and by-elections. The Parliament was dissolved on September 7, 2008, with an election to determine the membership of the 40th Parliament occurring on October 14, 2008.

There were two sessions of the 39th Parliament:

Session	Start	End
1st	April 3, 2006	September 14, 2007
2nd	October 16, 2007	September 7, 2008

== Overview ==
The 39th Parliament was the longest minority government led by any Canadian federal government until the record was surpassed by Justin Trudeau's Liberal minority government in the 44th Parliament on June 17, 2024. No other Conservative minority had previously lasted a full year, and only Lester B. Pearson's governments had lasted more than two.

The 39th Parliament was controlled by a Conservative Party minority, led by Prime Minister Stephen Harper and the 28th Canadian Ministry, which assumed power on February 6, 2006. The Official Opposition was the Liberal Party, led first by interim leader Bill Graham, and then by Stéphane Dion for the remainder of the Parliament's life.

The Speaker was Liberal Peter Milliken. Milliken was re-elected as the Speaker of the House for the 39th Parliament on April 3, 2006. The Speaker only votes in a tie, and, as Milliken is a Liberal, the Liberal caucus was effectively reduced by one. This, along with the defection of Wajid Khan to the Conservatives enabled the Conservatives to pass legislation with the cooperation of any one of the three opposition parties: Liberals, Bloc Québécois, or New Democratic Party (NDP).

The Parliament was dissolved by Governor General Michaëlle Jean on the advice of Prime Minister Stephen Harper on September 7, 2008. The general election for the members of the 40th Parliament of Canada was held on October 14, 2008.

== Party standings ==
The party standings as of the election and as of dissolution on September 7, 2008, are on the table below. Between these events, five members of the House of Commons crossed the floor, one died, twelve resigned, and nine members were elected in by-elections to fill vacancies, leaving four vacancies at dissolution. In that same period, two senators died, six reached the mandatory retirement age of 75, four resigned, and two were appointed to fill vacancies, leaving fifteen vacancies at dissolution. Step-by-step changes are listed in the Members section. See List of Canadian federal electoral districts for a list of the ridings in this parliament.

Affiliation	House members		Senate members	
Affiliation	2006 election results	At dissolution	On election day 2006^{1}	At dissolution
Conservative	124	127	23	22
Liberal	103	95	67	58
Bloc Québécois	51	48	0	0
New Democratic	29	30	1^{2}	0
Green	0	1^{4}	0	0
Independent	1	3^{3}	5	5
Senate PC	0	0	4	3
Independent Liberal	0	0	0	1
Independent NDP	0	0	0	1^{2}
Total members	308	304	100	90
Vacant	0	4	5	15
Total seats	308		105	

^{1}Members of the Canadian Senate are appointed by the governor general on the advice of the prime minister and remain as senators until the age of 75, even if the House of Commons has been dissolved or an election has been called.
^{2}Lillian Dyck was officially designated as affiliated with the New Democratic Party, despite the fact that the party would not accept her affiliation (due to the party's position on the Senate). Her official affiliation did not change until October 31, 2006.
^{3}André Arthur, Louise Thibault, Bill Casey.
^{4} Blair Wilson as a member of Green Party.

== Major events ==
=== Liberal leadership ===
During the election campaign, the Liberal leader was then-Prime Minister Paul Martin. After the election results were announced, Martin announced his intention to resign, but did not indicate when, other than saying he would not lead the party into the next election. On February 1, 2006, the Liberal Party Caucus chose Bill Graham as parliamentary leader, meaning he served as Leader of the Opposition in the House of Commons until the election of Stéphane Dion as Liberal leader at the Liberal Party leadership convention, held December 2–3, 2006.

On March 18, 2006 Martin tendered his resignation as Leader of the Liberal Party of Canada.

=== Five priorities ===
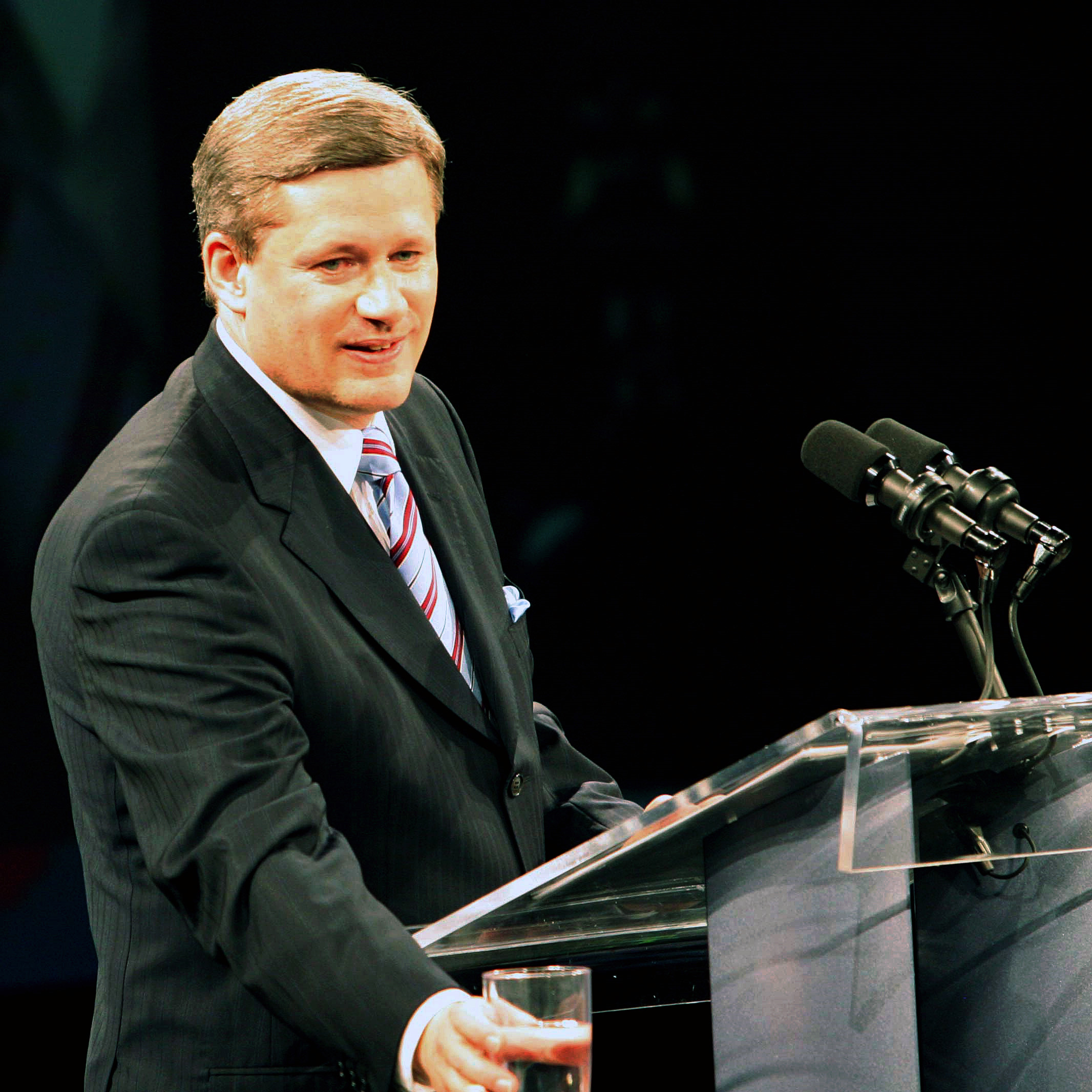
Stephen Harper is Prime Minister during the 39th Canadian Parliament. He is seen here giving his victory speech after the 2006 federal election which ended thirteen years of Liberal rule.

Prime Minister Harper said he would move forward with his top five priorities from the campaign. At least four of these would require legislative action: the passage of a Federal Accountability Act in response to the sponsorship scandal; setting longer mandatory sentences; lowering the Goods & Services Tax to 6% (and eventually to 5%); giving $1,200 for parents per child under the age of 6; and negotiating with the provinces to shorten wait-times (this priority was replaced, post-election, with combating crime by creating more police officers). The child allowance and first GST were in place by July 1, 2006. On December 6, 2006, another issue many expected to arise in the first session of parliament did, in fact, come to the fore, when the government introduced a motion calling "on the government to introduce legislation to restore the traditional definition of marriage without affecting civil unions and while respecting existing same-sex marriages". The next day, the House defeated the motion by a vote of 175 to 123, with six cabinet ministers voting against it, and Harper declared the issue settled. (See Members of the 39th Canadian Parliament and same-sex marriage for more information.) and on January 1, 2008 the second GST reduction came into effect. The Federal Accountability Act received Royal Assent on December 12, 2006

== Legislation and motions ==
Important business of the 39th Parliament includes the following bills and motions. Note that not all of these bills become law. Motions (excepting those which pass bills) have no effect in law. A complete list of bills of the 39th Parliament is on the Parliament's website, divided into bills from the 1st and 2nd sessions. On the site, the bills are divided into government bills, private member's bills, and private bills for both the House and the Senate.

=== Noteworthy acts passed by 39th Parliament ===
- Bill C-2, the Federal Accountability Act (officially "An Act providing for conflict of interest rules, restrictions on election financing and measures respecting administrative transparency, oversight and accountability"), received Royal Assent in the Senate on December 12, 2006, and is now becoming law. The Act plans to reduce the opportunity to exert influence with money by banning corporate, union, and large personal political donations; create a five-year lobbying ban on former ministers, their aides, and senior public servants; provide protection for whistleblowers; and enhancing the power for the Auditor General to follow the money spent by the government.
- Bill C-13 is The 2006 Canadian federal budget, which received Royal Assent in the Senate on June 22, 2006.

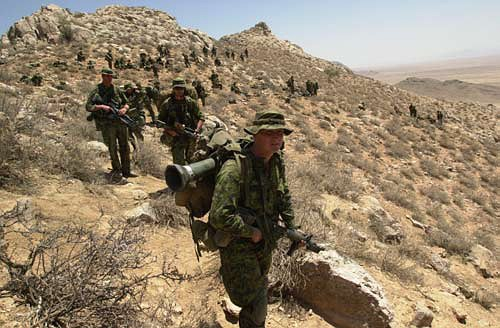
Canadian soldiers in Afghanistan.

- A motion in the House to extend Canada's mission in Afghanistan by two years was successful. The motion was supported by the Conservatives and 30 Liberal MPs, allowing it to narrowly pass 149–145 on May 17, 2006. Even outside of government bills, the Prime Minister's support of Canada's action has been a recurring topic, gaining him both supporters and critics among the Canadian population. On March 13, 2008, the mission was further extended until July 2011 by a vote of 197–77, with Conservative and Liberal MPs in favour, and Bloc and NDP MPs opposed.
- Bill C-24, the "Softwood Lumber Products Export Charge Act, 2006" put into effect the deal made between the Canadian and American governments regarding the longstanding softwood lumber debates. The Act received Royal Assent December 14, 2006.
- A motion passed by the opposition parties (161 for to 115 against) on February 5, 2007 to reaffirm Canada's commitment to the Kyoto Protocol. The motion may not have any legal effect, but it is related to Bill C-288 – which received Royal Assent on June 22, 2007.
- Bill C-16, titled "An Act to amend the Canada Elections Act", is a bill to set fixed election dates. Future elections will be held on the third Monday in October in the fourth calendar year following polling day for the last general election. Had Parliament not been dissolved on September 7, 2008 the next general election under this act would have been held on October 19, 2009; instead the next general election took place on October 14, 2008. The provinces of British Columbia, Saskatchewan, Ontario, and Newfoundland and Labrador have already implemented fixed election dates for their own provincial elections. Bill C-16 passed in the House on November 6, 2006 and the Senate on March 28, 2007. The House began discussing the amendments made in the Senate on April 21, 2007. The House voted against the amendments on April 24, 2007. On May 1, 2007, the Senate chose not to insist on its amendment. The bill received Royal Assent on May 3.
- Bill C-9, titled "An Act to amend the Criminal Code (conditional sentence of imprisonment)", is a bill to set minimum penalties for offences involving firearms. Under this act, persons convicted of a serious personal injury offence or a terrorism offence with a term of imprisonment of ten years or more would not be eligible for a conditional sentence. Bill C-9 passed in the House on November 3, 2006 and was passed by the Senate on May 16, 2007. The bill received Royal Assent on May 31, 2007.
- Bill C-2, titled An Act to amend the Criminal Code and to make consequential amendments to other Acts (Tackling Violent Crime Act) was the government's omnibus crime bill which received Royal Assent on February 29, 2008 and amended several pieces of legislation. Among other things, the bill raised the age of consent to 16 from 14, imposed minimum mandatory sentence for crimes involving firearms, instituted a "three-strikes-and-you're-out" (also known as a "reverse onus sentencing") for habitual offenders, and restricted "house arrest" policies for serious offenders. The bill received royal assent on February 28, 2008 and sections 1 to 17, 28 to 38, 54, 57 and 58 went into force on May 1, 2008 and sections 18 to 27, 39 to 53, 55, 56, 59 and 60 went into force on July 2, 2008.
- Bill C-288, an act of the opposition parties to try to make the government support its global climate change obligations under the Kyoto Protocol. It received Royal Assent on June 22, 2007.
- Bill C-52 is the 2007 Canadian federal budget.
- Bill C-50 is the 2008 Canadian federal budget.

=== Noteworthy motions passed by 39th Parliament ===
- A successful motion in the House to recognize the Québécois as a nation within a united Canada. The motion was put forward by the Prime Minister in reaction to an announced motion by Bloc Québécois leader Gilles Duceppe that would recognise Quebec as a nation, but did not contain the words "in Canada". The motion easily passed 266 to 16, with all party leaders voting in favour, including Duceppe
- On June 3, 2008, the Parliament of Canada passed a motion (137 to 110) which recommended that the government immediately implement a program which would "allow conscientious objectors...to a war not sanctioned by the United Nations...to...remain in Canada..." The motion gained international attention from The New York Times, Britain's BBC and the New Zealand press.
- Private Member's Motion 296, which stated "That, in the opinion of the House, the government should immediately adopt a child first principle, based on Jordan's Principle, to resolve jurisdictional disputes involving the care of First Nations children." was passed unanimously in the House of Commons on December 12, 2007.

=== Failed acts and motions ===
- A government motion to reopen the same-sex marriage debate failed. The 38th Canadian Parliament, led by the Liberals, had legalized same-sex marriage a year earlier. Several provinces had legalized same-sex marriage before that. During his campaign, Harper promised a parliamentary vote on reopening the issue. The motion failed 175–123 leaving same-sex marriage legal in Canada and the legal debate about it closed.
- A failed government motion (159 opposed to 124 in favour) to renew certain sunsetted provisions of the Anti-terrorism Act, first passed by the Liberals after 9/11 that suspended some civil liberties in order to combat terrorism.

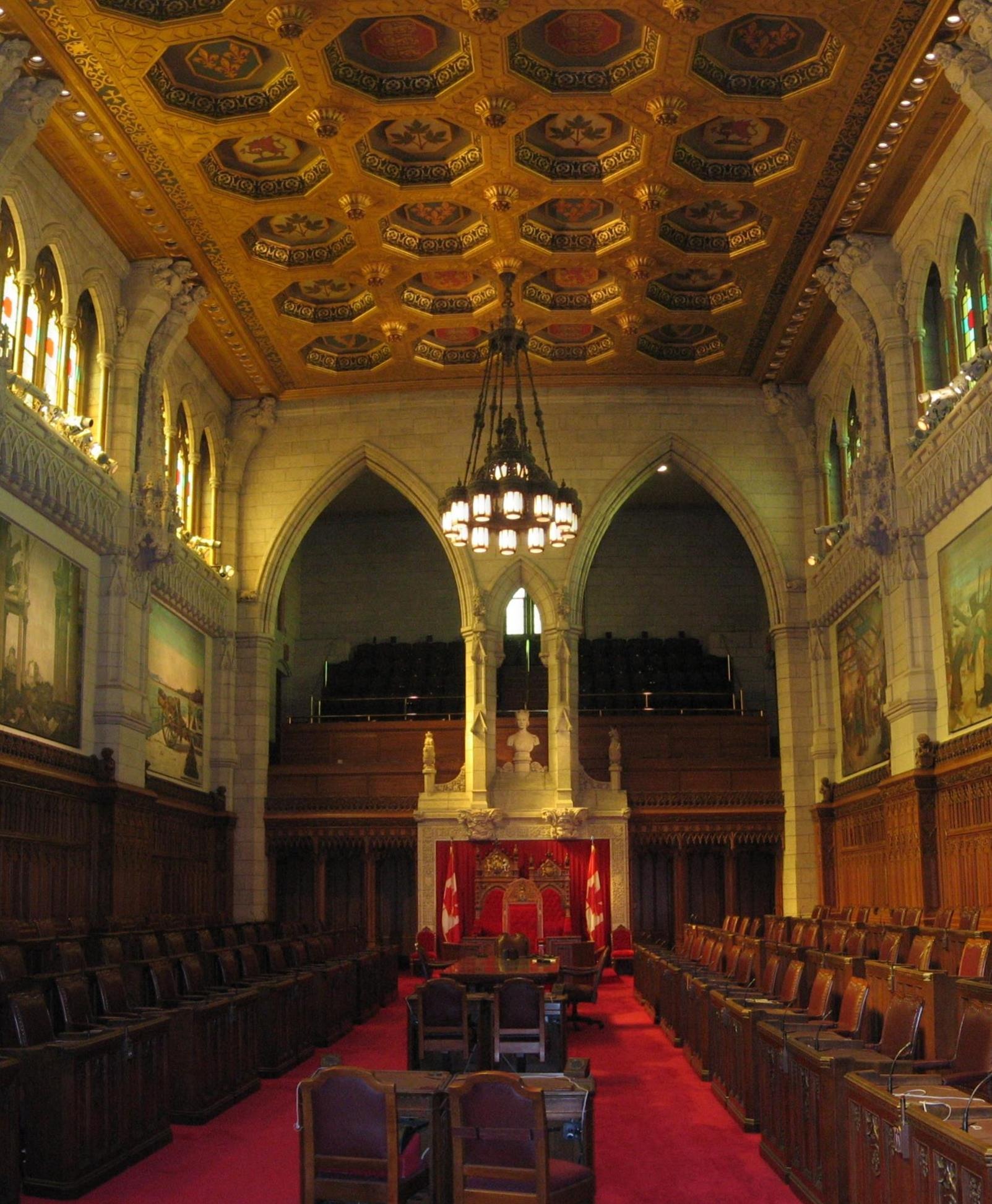
The government introduced multiple bills to reform the Senate of Canada, none of which became laws.

=== Acts that died on the Order Paper ===
- Bill C-19 (previously Bill S-4) titled An Act to amend the Constitution Act, 1867 (Senate tenure) was a bill to limit new Senators' tenure to eight-year terms. Currently, senators can stay in office until they reach the age of 75. The bill was first introduced by the government in the Senate on May 30, 2006. After consideration in committee and making amendments to the bill, the Senate recommended that the bill not be proceeded with until such time as the Supreme Court of Canada had ruled with respect to its constitutionality, which had not occurred prior to dissolution. The bill was reintroduced in the second session as a Commons bill on November 13, 2007, but did not become law before the session ended.
- Bill C-20 (previously Bill C-43), titled "An Act to provide for consultations with electors on their preferences for appointments to the Senate", was a bill to hold referendums on Senate appointments, introduced December 13, 2006. The bill did not pass by the end of the 1st session of parliament, and was reintroduced in the 2nd session on November 13, 2007. The bill was sent to a legislative committee before second reading on February 13, 2008, but it did not become law before the end of the session.
- Bill C-22 (previously Bill C-56), titled "An Act to amend the Constitution Act, 1867 (Democratic representation)" was a bill which would add 22 seats to the House of Commons. This would increase the number to 330 seats, although these seats probably will not be in use until at least 2014. Under the proposed plan, Ontario would gain ten seats, British Columbia would get another seven seats, and Alberta would receive another five seats. The bill did not pass by the end of the 1st session of parliament, and was reintroduced in the 2nd session. The bill was delayed by an amendment by the Bloc and did not become law by the end of the session.
- Bill C-10 (previously Bill C-33), among a long list of minor changes to tax law contained a controversial clause that would give the government power to deny taxation benefits for films made in Canada if the government deems the content to be objectionable. David Cronenberg and Sarah Polley argued it is equivalent to censorship because most Canadian films cannot afford to be produced without government assistance. The Bill was passed in the House October 29, 2007, but opposition parties later said that they did not notice the controversial part and several Senators have said that they intend to send the Bill back to the House.
- Bill C-61, titled An Act to amend the Copyright Act, automatically died before second reading when the 39th Parliament was dissolved prematurely and an election was called by the Governor General Michaëlle Jean at Prime Minister Stephen Harper's request on September 7, 2008. The controversial bill was tabled in 2008 during the second session of the 39th Canadian Parliament by Minister of Industry Jim Prentice.

== Parliamentarians ==
House of Commons

Senate

== Ministry ==
The 28th Canadian Ministry was formed during the 39th Canadian Parliament and lasted until the end of the 41st Canadian Parliament

== Officeholders ==
=== Head of State ===
Office	Photo	Name	Assumed office	Left office
Sovereign		Elizabeth II	February 6, 1952	September 8, 2022
Governor General		Michaëlle Jean	September 27, 2005	October 1, 2010

=== Party leadership ===
Party	Photo	Name	Assumed Office	Left Office
Conservative		Stephen Harper	March 20, 2004	October 19, 2015
Liberal		Bill Graham (Interim)	March 19, 2006	December 2, 2006
Liberal		Stéphane Dion	December 2, 2006	December 10, 2008
Bloc Québécois		Gilles Duceppe	March 15, 1997	May 2, 2011
New Democratic		Jack Layton	January 25, 2003	August 22, 2011

=== House of Commons ===
==== Presiding officer ====
Office	Photo	Party	Officer	Riding	Assumed office	Left office
Speaker of the House of Commons		Liberal	Hon. Peter Milliken	Kingston and the Islands	January 29, 2001	June 2, 2011

Hon. Peter Milliken (the Liberal member for Kingston and the Islands) was re-elected Speaker of the House of Commons on April 3, 2006. He defeated Diane Marleau (the Liberal Member for Sudbury) and Marcel Proulx (the Liberal Member for Hull—Aylmer) on the first ballot, becoming only the third Speaker from an opposition party in history.

==== Government leadership (Conservative) ====
Office	Photo	Officer	Riding	Assumed Office	Left Office
Prime Minister		Stephen Harper	Calgary Southwest	March 20, 2004	October 19, 2015
House Leader		Rob Nicholson	Niagara Falls	February 6, 2006	January 4, 2007
House Leader		Peter Van Loan	York—Simcoe	January 4, 2007	October 29, 2008
Whip		Jay Hill	Prince George—Peace River	February 16, 2006	October 30, 2008
Deputy Government Whip		Pierre Lemieux	Glengarry—Prescott—Russell	2006	2008

Other chair occupants

- Deputy Speaker and Chair of Committees of the Whole – Hon. Bill Blaikie (the New Democratic Party Member for Elmwood—Transcona). An MP since 1979, he is the longest-serving current Member of the House.
- Deputy Chair of Committees of the Whole — Royal Galipeau (the Conservative Member for Ottawa—Orléans). He is the first member of Parliament to hold this position without previous parliamentary experience.
- Assistant Deputy Chair of Committees of the Whole — Andrew Scheer (the Conservative Member for Regina—Qu'Appelle). As one of Canada's youngest MPs, is a vocal advocate of western concerns.

==== Other Floor leaders ====
- Opposition House Leader: Hon. Ralph Goodale
- Bloc Québécois House leader:
  1. Michel Gauthier (until April 20, 2007)
  2. Pierre Paquette (from April 20, 2007)
- New Democratic Party House leader: Libby Davies

==== Other Whips ====
The party whips in this Parliament were as follows:

- Official Opposition Whip: Hon. Karen Redman
- Bloc Québécois Whip: Michel Guimond
- New Democratic Party Whip: Yvon Godin

==== Other notable members ====
- Right Honourable Paul Martin, Liberal, former Prime Minister sitting the back benches as Member of Parliament for LaSalle—Émard

=== Senate ===
==== Speaker ====
- Hon. Noël Kinsella is the Speaker of the Senate (a Conservative Senator for New Brunswick).
- Speaker pro tempore of the Canadian Senate — Hon. Rose-Marie Losier-Cool (a Liberal Senator for New Brunswick).

==== Floor leaders ====
- Leader of the Government in the Senate: Hon. Marjory LeBreton
- Leader of the Opposition in the Senate: Hon. Céline Hervieux-Payette

== Changes to Party Standings ==
=== Floor-crossings ===
Five members of parliament crossed the floor since the election on January 23, 2006:

- On February 6, 2006, David Emerson, elected as the Liberal Member of Parliament for Vancouver Kingsway, crossed the floor to join Stephen Harper's cabinet as Minister of International Trade.
- On January 5, 2007, Wajid Khan, elected as the Liberal MP for Mississauga—Streetsville, crossed the floor to join the Conservative Party.
- On February 6, 2007, Garth Turner, elected as a Conservative MP for Halton, moved to the Liberal caucus. He had been sitting as an independent since being suspended from the Tory caucus on October 18, 2006.
- On June 26, 2007, Joe Comuzzi, elected as a Liberal MP for Thunder Bay—Superior North, moved to the Conservative caucus. He had been sitting as an independent since being suspended from the Liberal caucus on March 21, 2007.
- On August 30, 2008, Blair Wilson elected as a Liberal MP for West Vancouver—Sunshine Coast—Sea to Sky Country, moved to the Green caucus. He had been sitting as an independent since he resigned from the Liberal caucus on October 28, 2007.

=== By-elections ===
On September 20, 2006 Liberal MP Joe Fontana (London North Centre) resigned to run in the London mayoralty election. Fontana was replaced in the riding by Liberal Glen Pearson after a by-election on November 27, 2006.

Liberal MP Jean Lapierre declared on January 11, 2007 that he would resign from the Liberal Party at the end of the month to pursue a career in television. This took place on January 28, leaving the Outremont district vacant. On July 28, Prime Minister Stephen Harper called by-elections for this and two other Quebec ridings, which were held on September 17, 2007. Newcomer NDP candidate Thomas Mulcair won this riding over star Liberal candidate Jocelyn Coulon, only the second-ever time Outremont has not been won by a Liberal candidate. Mulcair was previously a Provincial Liberal Cabinet Minister in Quebec.

On February 21, 2007, Yvan Loubier (representing Saint-Hyacinthe—Bagot for the Bloc Québécois) resigned in order to run in the 2007 Quebec general election. Loubier was replaced in a by-election on September 17, 2007, by newcomer Bloc candidate Ève-Mary Thaï Thi Lac.

One day later, on February 22, veteran Liberal MP and former Liberal Party of Canada interim leader Bill Graham announced that he would not seek reelection in the next federal election. On June 19, 2007, Graham announced he would be resigning his Toronto Centre seat effective July 2, 2007, to allow former Ontario New Democratic Party Premier and Liberal Party leadership candidate Bob Rae to run in the riding. Rae went on to win the Liberal stronghold riding in a March 17, 2008 byelection.

On March 8, 2007, Liberal MP Jim Peterson announced that he would not be a candidate in his Willowdale riding in the next federal election. On June 20, 2007, Peterson followed Bill Graham's lead and announced his resignation from the House of Commons, effective July 12. Both Bill Graham and Jim Peterson resigned their seats early in the hope that Prime Minister Stephen Harper would be compelled to add those vacant seats to the scheduled September 17, 2007 by-elections in Quebec. On July 23, the Tory government announced that it would delay the Ontario by-elections so as not to overlap with the impending 2007 Ontario general election scheduled for October 10, 2007. When the by-election was eventually held in the riding on March 17, 2008, appointed former Liberal Party leadership candidate Martha Hall Findlay won handily.

Also in March 2007, Bloc Québécois MP and former BQ House Leader Michel Gauthier announced that he would not run in the next federal election. He resigned his seat of Roberval—Lac-Saint-Jean on July 29, 2007. Gauthier was replaced in a by-election on September 17, 2007, by newcomer Conservative candidate and former Roberval mayor Denis Lebel.

On July 5, 2007, Liberal MP Stephen Owen announced he would resign his seat of Vancouver Quadra to accept a position at the University of British Columbia, his resignation effective July 27, 2007. Owen was replaced in the riding by former BC Provincial Liberal MLA Joyce Murray, after a by-election on March 17, 2008.

On July 11, 2007, Liberal MP Gary Merasty announced he would resign his Desnethé—Missinippi—Churchill River seat, due to "family considerations", effective August 31, 2007. Merasty was replaced in the riding by Conservative newcomer Rob Clarke, after a by-election on March 17, 2008.

On December 12, 2007, Liberal MP Lucienne Robillard announced she would resign her seat of Westmount-Ville-Marie effective January 25, 2008.

On March 14, 2008 Bloc MP Maka Kotto resigned, followed by Liberal MP Brenda Chamberlain resigned on April 7. Another Liberal MP, John Godfrey, resigned on August 1.

By-election	Date	Incumbent	Party	Winner	Party	Cause	Retained
Toronto Centre	March 17, 2008	Bill Graham	Liberal	Bob Rae	Liberal	Resigned	Yes
Willowdale	March 17, 2008	Jim Peterson	Liberal	Martha Hall Findlay	Liberal	Resigned	Yes
Vancouver Quadra	March 17, 2008	Stephen Owen	Liberal	Joyce Murray	Liberal	Resigned	Yes
Desnethé—Missinippi— Churchill River	March 17, 2008	Gary Merasty	Liberal	Rob Clarke	Conservative	Resigned to enter private sector	No
Outremont	September 17, 2007	Jean Lapierre	Liberal	Thomas Mulcair	New Democratic	Resigned	No
Saint-Hyacinthe—Bagot	September 17, 2007	Yvan Loubier	Bloc Québécois	Ève-Mary Thaï Thi Lac	Bloc Québécois	Resigned to enter provincial politics	Yes
Roberval—Lac-Saint-Jean	September 17, 2007	Michel Gauthier	Bloc Québécois	Denis Lebel	Conservative	Resigned	No
London North Centre	November 27, 2006	Joe Fontana	Liberal	Glen Pearson	Liberal	Resigned to run for Mayor of London	Yes
Repentigny	November 27, 2006	Benoît Sauvageau	Bloc Québécois	Raymond Gravel	Bloc Québécois	Death (car accident)	Yes

== Major reports and inquiries ==
- "Rail Safety Act Review", Chaired by the Hon. Doug Lewis reported 31 October 2007; discussed in TRAN committee 12 November 2007; tabled in House of Commons by the Hon. Lawrence Cannon on 7 March 2008
