= President pro tempore =

Presiding legislative body officer in the absence of the position holder

A president pro tempore or speaker pro tempore is an officer of a legislative body who presides over the chamber in the absence of the normal presiding officer. The phrase pro tempore is Latin "for the time being".

In Argentina, a similar role is carried by the provisional president of the Argentine Senate in the absence of the vice president of Argentina. By the 1994 amendment to the 1853 Constitution, the vice president is designated as the senate president.

== List of presidents pro tempore ==
=== Canada ===
- Speaker Pro Tempore of the Canadian Senate

=== Liberia ===
- List of presidents pro tempore of the Senate of Liberia

=== United States ===
- President pro tempore of the United States Senate
- Speaker pro tempore of the United States House of Representatives
- President pro tempore of the California State Senate
- President pro tempore of the Kentucky Senate
- President pro tempore of the North Carolina Senate
- President pro tempore of the North Dakota Senate
- President pro tempore of the Oklahoma Senate
- President pro tempore of the Pennsylvania Senate
- President pro tempore of the Senate of Virginia
- President pro tempore of the Texas Senate
- Speaker pro tempore of the House of Representatives of Puerto Rico

=== Philippines ===
- President pro tempore of the Senate of the Philippines

=== International organizations ===
- President pro tempore of the Union of South American Nations
