= List of House members of the 38th Parliament of Canada =

This is a list of members of the House of Commons of Canada in the 38th Parliament of Canada (October 4, 2004 to November 29, 2005).

Conservative
Liberal
Bloc Québécois
New Democratic
Independent

== Members ==
- Bold text denotes cabinet ministers
- Italic text denotes party leaders.
- The prime minister is **both**.
- The speaker is indicated by "†".
- Parliamentary secretaries is indicated by "‡".

=== Alberta ===
Name	Party	Electoral district	First elected / previously elected	No. of terms
Brian Jean	Conservative	Athabasca	2004	1st term
Lee Richardson	Conservative	Calgary Centre	1988, (Note: Calgary Southeast) 2004	2nd term*
Jim Prentice	Conservative	Calgary Centre--North	2004	1st term
Deepak Obhrai	Conservative	Calgary East	1997	3rd term
Art Hanger	Conservative	Calgary Northeast	1993	4th term
Diane Ablonczy	Conservative	Calgary—Nose Hill	1993	4th term
Jason Kenney	Conservative	Calgary Southeast	1997	3rd term
Stephen Harper	Conservative	Calgary Southwest	1993, (Note: Calgary West) 2002	3rd term*
Rob Anders	Conservative	Calgary West	1997	3rd term
Kevin Sorenson	Conservative	Crowfoot	2000	2nd term
**Anne McLellan**	Liberal	Edmonton Centre	1993	4th term
Peter Goldring	Conservative	Edmonton East	1997	3rd term
James Rajotte	Conservative	Edmonton—Leduc	2000	2nd term
David Kilgour	Liberal	Edmonton—Mill Woods—Beaumont	1979 (Note: First elected as a Progressive Conservative)	8th time
David Kilgour	Independent	Edmonton—Mill Woods—Beaumont	1979	8th time
Rahim Jaffer	Conservative	Edmonton—Strathcona	1997	3rd term
John Williams	Conservative	Edmonton—St. Albert	1993	4th term
Ken Epp	Conservative	Edmonton—Sherwood Park	1993	4th term
Rona Ambrose	Conservative	Edmonton—Spruce Grove	2004	1st term
Rick Casson	Conservative	Lethbridge	1997	3rd term
Ted Menzies	Conservative	Macleod	2004	1st term
Monte Solberg	Conservative	Medicine Hat	1993	4th term
Charlie Penson	Conservative	Peace River	1993	4th term
Bob Mills	Conservative	Red Deer	1993	4th term
Leon Benoit	Conservative	Vegreville—Wainwright	1993	4th term
David Chatters	Conservative	Westlock—St. Paul	1993	4th term
Dale Johnston	Conservative	Wetaskiwin	1993	4th term
Myron Thompson	Conservative	Wild Rose	1993	4th term
Rob Merrifield	Conservative	Yellowhead	2000	2nd term

=== British Columbia ===
Name	Party	Electoral district	First elected / previously elected	No. of terms
Randy White	Conservative	Abbotsford	1993	4th term
Jim Gouk	Conservative	British Columbia Southern Interior	1993	4th term
Bill Siksay	New Democratic	Burnaby—Douglas	2004	1st term
Peter Julian	New Democratic	Burnaby—New Westminster	2004	1st term
Richard Harris	Conservative	Cariboo—Prince George	1993	4th term
Chuck Strahl	Conservative	Chilliwack—Fraser Canyon	1993	4th term
John Cummins	Conservative	Delta—Richmond East	1993	4th term
Keith Martin ‡	Liberal	Esquimalt—Juan de Fuca	1993 (Note: First elected as a member of the Reform/Canadian Alliance party)	4th term
Nina Grewal	Conservative	Fleetwood—Port Kells	2004	1st term
Betty Hinton	Conservative	Kamloops—Thompson—Cariboo	2000	2nd term
Werner Schmidt	Conservative	Kelowna—Lake Country	1993	4th term
Jim Abbott	Conservative	Kootenay—Columbia	1993	4th term
Mark Warawa	Conservative	Langley	2004	1st term
James Lunney	Conservative	Nanaimo—Alberni	2000	2nd term
Jean Crowder	New Democratic	Nanaimo—Cowichan	2004	1st term
Paul Forseth	Conservative	New Westminster—Coquitlam	1993	4th term
Gurmant Grewal	Conservative	Newton—North Delta	1997	3rd term
Darrel Stinson	Conservative	North Okanagan—Shuswap	1993	4th term
Don Bell	Liberal	North Vancouver	2004	1st term
Stockwell Day	Conservative	Okanagan—Coquihalla	2000	3rd term
Randy Kamp	Conservative	Pitt Meadows—Maple Ridge—Mission	2004	1st term
James Moore	Conservative	Port Moody—Westwood—Port Coquitlam	2000	2nd term
Jay Hill	Conservative	Prince George—Peace River	1993	4th term
**Raymond Chan**	Liberal	Richmond	1993, 2004	3rd term*
Gary Lunn	Conservative	Saanich—Gulf Islands	1997	3rd term
Russ Hiebert	Conservative	South Surrey—White Rock—Cloverdale	2004	1st term
Nathan Cullen	New Democratic	Skeena—Bulkley Valley	2004	1st term
Chuck Cadman	Independent	Surrey North	1997	3rd term
Vacant		Surrey North	1997	3rd term
Hedy Fry ‡	Liberal	Vancouver Centre	1993	4th term
Libby Davies	New Democratic	Vancouver East	1997	3rd term
John Duncan	Conservative	Vancouver Island North	1993	4th term
**David Emerson**	Liberal	Vancouver Kingsway	2004	1st term
**Stephen Owen**	Liberal	Vancouver Quadra	2000	2nd term
**Ujjal Dosanjh**	Liberal	Vancouver South	2004	1st term
David Anderson	Liberal	Victoria	1968, (Note: Esquimalt—Saanich) 1993	5th term*
John Reynolds	Conservative	West Vancouver—Sunshine Coast—Sea to Sky Country	1972, (Note: Burnaby—Richmond—Delta (First elected as a Progressive Conservative)) 1997	5th term*

=== Manitoba ===
Name	Party	Electoral district	First elected / previously elected	No. of terms
Merv Tweed	Conservative	Brandon—Souris	2004	1st term
Steven Fletcher	Conservative	Charleswood—St. James—Assiniboia	2004	1st term
Bev Desjarlais	New Democratic	Churchill	1997	3rd term
Bev Desjarlais	Independent	Churchill	1997	3rd term
Inky Mark	Conservative	Dauphin—Swan River—Marquette	1997	3rd term
Bill Blaikie	New Democratic	Elmwood—Transcona	1979	8th time
Joy Smith	Conservative	Kildonan—St. Paul	2004	1st term
Brian Pallister	Conservative	Portage—Lisgar	2000	2nd term
Vic Toews	Conservative	Provencher	2000	2nd term
Raymond Simard ‡	Liberal	Saint Boniface	2002	2nd term
James Bezan	Conservative	Selkirk—Interlake	2004	1st term
Pat Martin	New Democratic	Winnipeg Centre	1997	3rd term
Judy Wasylycia-Leis	New Democratic	Winnipeg North	1997	3rd term
**Reg Alcock**	Liberal	Winnipeg South	1993	4th term
Anita Neville ‡	Liberal	Winnipeg South Centre	2000	2nd term

=== New Brunswick ===
Name	Party	Electoral district	First elected / previously elected	No. of terms
Yvon Godin	New Democratic	Acadie—Bathurst	1997	3rd term
Dominic LeBlanc ‡	Liberal	Beauséjour	2000	2nd term
**Andy Scott**	Liberal	Fredericton	1993	4th term
Rob Moore	Conservative	Fundy Royal	2004	1st term
Jean-Claude D'Amours	Liberal	Madawaska—Restigouche	2004	1st term
Charles Hubbard ‡	Liberal	Miramichi	1993	4th term
**Claudette Bradshaw**	Liberal	Moncton—Riverview—Dieppe	1997	3rd term
Greg Thompson	Conservative	New Brunswick Southwest	1988, 1997	4th term*
Paul Zed	Liberal	Saint John	1993, (Note: Fundy Royal) 2004	2nd term*
Andy Savoy	Liberal	Tobique—Mactaquac	2000	2nd term

=== Newfoundland and Labrador ===
Name	Party	Electoral district	First elected / previously elected	No. of terms
**John Efford**	Liberal	Avalon	2002	2nd term
Scott Simms	Liberal	Bonavista—Gander—Grand Falls—Windsor	2004	1st term
Gerry Byrne ‡	Liberal	Humber—St. Barbe—Baie Verte	1996	4th term
Lawrence D. O'Brien	Liberal	Labrador	1996	4th term
Todd Russell (2005)	Liberal	Labrador	2005	1st term
Bill Matthews	Liberal	Random—Burin—St. George's	1997	3rd term
Norman Doyle	Conservative	St. John's East	1997	3rd term
Loyola Hearn	Conservative	St. John's South—Mount Pearl	2000	3rd term

=== Nova Scotia ===
Name	Party	Electoral district	First elected / previously elected	No. of terms
Rodger Cuzner	Liberal	Cape Breton—Canso	2000	2nd term
Peter MacKay	Conservative	Central Nova	1997	3rd term
Bill Casey	Conservative	Cumberland—Colchester—Musquodoboit Valley	1988, 1997	4th term*
Michael Savage	Liberal	Dartmouth—Cole Harbour	2004	1st term
Alexa McDonough	New Democratic	Halifax	1997	3rd term
**Geoff Regan**	Liberal	Halifax West	1993, 2000	3rd term*
**Scott Brison**	Liberal	Kings—Hants	1997, 2000	3rd term*
Peter Stoffer	New Democratic	Sackville——Eastern Shore	1997	3rd term
Gerald Keddy	Conservative	South Shore—St. Margaret's	1997	3rd term
Mark Eyking ‡	Liberal	Sydney—Victoria	2000	2nd term
Robert Thibault ‡	Liberal	West Nova	2000	2nd term

=== Ontario ===
Name	Party	Electoral district	First elected / previously elected	No. of terms
Mark Holland	Liberal	Ajax—Pickering	2004	1st term
Brent St. Denis	Liberal	Algoma—Manitoulin—Kapuskasing	1993	4th term
Russ Powers	Liberal	Ancaster—Dundas—Flamborough—Westdale	2004	1st term
**Aileen Carroll**	Liberal	Barrie	1997	3rd term
Maria Minna	Liberal	Beaches—East York	1993	4th term
Gurbax Malhi ‡	Liberal	Bramalea—Gore—Malton	1993	4th term
Ruby Dhalla	Liberal	Brampton—Springdale	2004	1st term
Colleen Beaumier	Liberal	Brampton West	1993	4th term
Lloyd St. Amand	Liberal	Brant	2004	1st term
Larry Miller	Conservative	Bruce—Grey—Owen Sound	2004	1st term
Paddy Torsney ‡	Liberal	Burlington	1993	4th term
Gary Goodyear	Conservative	Cambridge	2004	1st term
Gordon O'Connor	Conservative	Carleton—Mississippi Mills	2004	1st term
Jerry Pickard ‡	Liberal	Chatham-Kent—Essex	1988	5th term
Mario Silva	Liberal	Davenport	2004	1st term
Yasmin Ratansi	Liberal	Don Valley East	2004	1st term
**John Godfrey**	Liberal	Don Valley West	1993	4th term
David Tilson	Conservative	Dufferin—Caledon	2004	1st term
Bev Oda	Conservative	Durham	2004	1st term
**Joe Volpe**	Liberal	Eglinton—Lawrence	1988	5th term
Joe Preston	Conservative	Elgin—Middlesex—London	2004	1st term
Jeff Watson	Conservative	Essex	2004	1st term
Borys Wrzesnewskyj	Liberal	Etobicoke Centre	2004	1st term
Jean Augustine	Liberal	Etobicoke—Lakeshore	1993	4th term
Roy Cullen ‡	Liberal	Etobicoke North	1996	4th term
Don Boudria	Liberal	Glengarry—Prescott—Russell	1984	6th term
Brenda Chamberlain	Liberal	Guelph	1993	4th term
Diane Finley	Conservative	Haldimand—Norfolk	2004	1st term
Barry Devolin	Conservative	Haliburton—Kawartha Lakes—Brock	2004	1st term
Gary Carr	Liberal	Halton	2004	1st term
David Christopherson	New Democratic	Hamilton Centre	2004	1st term
**Tony Valeri**	Liberal	Hamilton East—Stoney Creek	1993	4th term
Beth Phinney	Liberal	Hamilton Mountain	1988	5th term
Paul Steckle	Liberal	Huron—Bruce	1993	4th term
Roger Valley	Liberal	Kenora	2004	1st term
Peter Milliken †	Liberal	Kingston and the Islands	1988	5th term
Karen Redman	Liberal	Kitchener Centre	1997	3rd term
Lynn Myers	Liberal	Kitchener—Conestoga	1997	3rd term
Andrew Telegdi	Liberal	Kitchener—Waterloo	1993	4th term
Rose-Marie Ur	Liberal	Lambton—Kent—Middlesex	1993	4th term
Scott Reid	Conservative	Lanark—Frontenac—Lennox and Addington	2000	2nd term
Gord Brown	Conservative	Leeds—Grenville	2004	1st term
Pat O'Brien	Liberal	London—Fanshawe	1993	4th term
Pat O'Brien	Independent	London—Fanshawe	1993	4th term
**Joe Fontana**	Liberal	London North Centre	1988	5th term
Sue Barnes ‡	Liberal	London West	1993	4th term
**John McCallum**	Liberal	Markham—Unionville	2000	2nd term
Navdeep Bains ‡	Liberal	Mississauga—Brampton South	2004	1st term
**Albina Guarnieri**	Liberal	Mississauga East—Cooksville	1988	5th term
Carolyn Parrish	Liberal	Mississauga—Erindale	1993	4th term
Carolyn Parrish	Independent	Mississauga—Erindale	1993	4th term
Paul Szabo	Liberal	Mississauga South	1993	4th term
Wajid Khan	Liberal	Mississauga—Streetsville	2004	1st term
Pierre Poilievre	Conservative	Nepean—Carleton	2004	1st term
**Belinda Stronach**	Conservative	Newmarket—Aurora	2004	1st term
**Belinda Stronach**	Liberal	Newmarket—Aurora	2004	1st term
Rob Nicholson	Conservative	Niagara Falls	1984, 2004	3rd term*
Dean Allison	Conservative	Niagara West—Glanbrook	2004	1st term
Raymond Bonin	Liberal	Nickel Belt	1993	4th term
Anthony Rota	Liberal	Nipissing—Timiskaming	2004	1st term
Paul Macklin ‡	Liberal	Northumberland—Quinte West	2000	2nd term
Bonnie Brown	Liberal	Oakville	1993	4th term
Lui Temelkovski	Liberal	Oak Ridges—Markham	2004	1st term
Colin Carrie	Conservative	Oshawa	2004	1st term
Ed Broadbent	New Democratic	Ottawa Centre	1968, (Note: Oshawa—Whitby/Oshawa) 2004	8th time*
Marc Godbout	Liberal	Ottawa—Orléans	2004	1st term
David McGuinty	Liberal	Ottawa South	2004	1st term
**Mauril Bélanger**	Liberal	Ottawa—Vanier	1995	4th term
Marlene Catterall	Liberal	Ottawa West—Nepean	1988	5th term
Dave MacKenzie	Conservative	Oxford	2004	1st term
Sarmite Bulte	Liberal	Parkdale—High Park	1997	3rd term
**Andy Mitchell**	Liberal	Parry Sound-Muskoka	1993	4th term
Gary Schellenberger	Conservative	Perth Wellington	2003	2nd term
Peter Adams ‡	Liberal	Peterborough	1993	4th term
Dan McTeague ‡	Liberal	Pickering—Scarborough East	1993	4th term
Daryl Kramp	Conservative	Prince Edward—Hastings	2004	1st term
Cheryl Gallant	Conservative	Renfrew—Nipissing—Pembroke	2000	2nd term
Bryon Wilfert ‡	Liberal	Richmond Hill	1997	3rd term
Roger Gallaway	Liberal	Sarnia—Lambton	1993	4th term
Tony Martin	New Democratic	Sault. Ste. Marie	2004	1st term
Jim Karygiannis ‡	Liberal	Scarborough—Agincourt	1988	5th term
John Cannis	Liberal	Scarborough Centre	1993	4th term
John McKay	Liberal	Scarborough—Guildwood	1997	3rd term
Tom Wappel	Liberal	Scarborough Southwest	1988	5th term
Derek Lee	Liberal	Scarborough—Rouge River	1988	5th term
Helena Guergis	Conservative	Simcoe—Grey	2004	1st term
Paul DeVillers ‡	Liberal	Simcoe North	1993	4th term
Walt Lastewka ‡	Liberal	St. Catharines	1993	4th term
**Carolyn Bennett**	Liberal	St. Paul's	1997	3rd term
Guy Lauzon	Conservative	Stormont—Dundas—South Glengarry	2004	1st term
Diane Marleau ‡	Liberal	Sudbury	1988	5th term
Susan Kadis	Liberal	Thornhill	2004	1st term
Ken Boshcoff	Liberal	Thunder Bay—Rainy River	2004	1st term
**Joe Comuzzi**	Liberal	Thunder Bay—Superior North	1988	5th term
Charlie Angus	New Democratic	Timmins-James Bay	2004	1st term
**Bill Graham**	Liberal	Toronto Centre	1993	4th term
Jack Layton	New Democratic	Toronto—Danforth	2004	1st term
**Tony Ianno**	Liberal	Trinity—Spadina	1993	4th term
Maurizio Bevilacqua	Liberal	Vaughan	1988	5th term
John Maloney	Liberal	Welland	1993	4th term
Michael Chong	Conservative	Wellington—Halton Hills	2004	1st term
Judi Longfield ‡	Liberal	Whitby—Oshawa	1997	3rd term
**Jim Peterson**	Liberal	Willowdale	1980, 1988	6th term*
Joe Comartin	New Democratic	Windsor—Tecumseh	2000	2nd term
Brian Masse	New Democratic	Windsor West	2002	2nd term
**Ken Dryden**	Liberal	York Centre	2004	1st term
Peter Van Loan	Conservative	York—Simcoe	2004	1st term
Alan Tonks	Liberal	York South—Weston	2000	2nd term
**Judy Sgro**	Liberal	York West	1999	3rd term

=== Prince Edward Island ===
Name	Party	Electoral district	First elected / previously elected	No. of terms
Lawrence MacAulay	Liberal	Cardigan	1988	5th term
Shawn Murphy ‡	Liberal	Charlottetown	2000	2nd term
**Joe McGuire**	Liberal	Egmont	1988	5th term
Wayne Easter ‡	Liberal	Malpeque	1993	4th term

=== Quebec ===
Name	Party	Electoral district	First elected / previously elected	No. of terms
Yvon Lévesque	Bloc Québécois	Abitibi—Baie-James—Nunavik—Eeyou	2004	1st term
Marc Lemay	Bloc Québécois	Abitibi—Témiscamingue	2004	1st term
Eleni Bakopanos ‡	Liberal	Ahuntsic	1993	4th term
Robert Carrier	Bloc Québécois	Alfred-Pellan	2004	1st term
Mario Laframboise	Bloc Québécois	Argenteuil—Papineau—Mirabel	2000	2nd term
Louis Plamondon	Bloc Québécois	Bas-Richelieu—Nicolet—Bécancour	1984	6th term
Claude Drouin ‡	Liberal	Beauce	1997	3rd term
Alain Boire	Bloc Québécois	Beauharnois—Salaberry	2004	1st term
Christian Simard	Bloc Québécois	Beauport—Limoilou	2004	1st term
Guy André	Bloc Québécois	Berthier—Maskinongé	2004	1st term
Denis Coderre	Liberal	Bourassa	1997	3rd term
Denis Paradis	Liberal	Brome—Missisquoi	1995	4th term
**Jacques Saada**	Liberal	Brossard—La Prairie	1997	3rd term
Yves Lessard	Bloc Québécois	Chambly—Borduas	2004	1st term
Richard Marceau	Bloc Québécois	Charlesbourg—Haute-Saint-Charles	1997	3rd term
Denise Poirier-Rivard	Bloc Québécois	Châteauguay—Saint-Constant	2004	1st term
Robert Bouchard	Bloc Québécois	Chicoutimi—Le Fjord	2004	1st term
France Bonsant	Bloc Québécois	Compton—Stanstead	2004	1st term
Pauline Picard	Bloc Québécois	Drummond	1993	4th term
Raynald Blais	Bloc Québécois	Gaspésie—Îles-de-la-Madeleine	2004	1st term
Françoise Boivin	Liberal	Gatineau	2004	1st term
Jean-Yves Roy	Bloc Québécois	Haute-Gaspésie—La Mitis—Matane—Matapédia	2000	2nd term
Réal Ménard	Bloc Québécois	Hochelaga	1993	4th term
Pablo Rodriguez	Liberal	Honoré—Mercier	2004	1st term
Marcel Proulx	Liberal	Hull—Aylmer	1999	3rd term
**Liza Frulla**	Liberal	Jeanne-Le Ber	2002	2nd term
Pierre Paquette	Bloc Québécois	Joliette	2000	2nd term
Sébastien Gagnon	Bloc Québécois	Jonquière—Alma	2002	2nd term
Francine Lalonde	Bloc Québécois	La Pointe-de-l'Île	1993	4th term
Francis Scarpaleggia	Liberal	Lac-Saint-Louis	2004	1st term
**Paul Martin**	Liberal	LaSalle—Émard	1988	5th term
Johanne Deschamps	Bloc Québécois	Laurentides—Labelle	2004	1st term
Gilles Duceppe	Bloc Québécois	Laurier—Sainte-Marie	1990	5th term
Nicole Demers	Bloc Québécois	Laval	2004	1st term
Raymonde Folco	Liberal	Laval—Les Îles	1997	3rd term
Réal Lapierre	Bloc Québécois	Lévis—Bellechasse	2004	1st term
Caroline St-Hilaire	Bloc Québécois	Longueuil—Pierre-Boucher	1997	3rd term
Odina Desrochers	Bloc Québécois	Lotbinière—Chutes-de-la-Chaudière	1997	3rd term
Roger Clavet	Bloc Québécois	Louis-Hébert	2004	1st term
Bernard Cleary	Bloc Québécois	Louis-Saint-Laurent	2004	1st term
Gérard Asselin	Bloc Québécois	Manicouagan	1993	4th term
Serge Ménard	Bloc Québécois	Marc-Aurèle-Fortin	2004	1st term
Marc Boulianne	Bloc Québécois	Mégantic—L'Érable	2004	1st term
Roger Gaudet	Bloc Québécois	Montcalm	2002	2nd term
Paul Crête	Bloc Québécois	Montmagny—L'Islet—Kamouraska—Rivière-du-Loup	1993	4th term
Michel Guimond	Bloc Québécois	Montmorency—Charlevoix—Haute-Côte-Nord	1993	4th term
**Irwin Cotler**	Liberal	Mount Royal	1999	3rd term
Marlene Jennings ‡	Liberal	Notre-Dame-de-Grâce—Lachine	1997	3rd term
**Jean Lapierre**	Liberal	Outremont	1979, (Note: Shefford) 2004	5th term*
**Pierre Pettigrew**	Liberal	Papineau	1996	4th term
Bernard Patry	Liberal	Pierrefonds—Dollard	1993	4th term
David Smith	Liberal	Pontiac	2004	1st term
Guy Côté	Bloc Québécois	Portneuf—Jacques-Cartier	2004	1st term
Christiane Gagnon	Bloc Québécois	Québec	1993	4th term
Benoît Sauvageau	Bloc Québécois	Repentigny	1993	4th term
André Bellavance	Bloc Québécois	Richmond—Arthabaska	2004	1st term
Louise Thibault	Bloc Québécois	Rimouski-Neigette—Témiscouata—Les Basques	2004	1st term
Gilles Perron	Bloc Québécois	Rivière-des-Mille-Îles	1997	3rd term
Monique Guay	Bloc Québécois	Rivière-du-Nord	1993	4th term
Michel Gauthier	Bloc Québécois	Roberval—Lac-Saint-Jean	1993	4th term
Bernard Bigras	Bloc Québécois	Rosemont—La Petite-Patrie	1997	3rd term
Carole Lavallée	Bloc Québécois	Saint-Bruno—Saint-Hubert	2004	1st term
Yvan Loubier	Bloc Québécois	Saint-Hyacinthe—Bagot	1993	4th term
Claude Bachand	Bloc Québécois	Saint-Jean	1993	4th term
Maka Kotto	Bloc Québécois	Saint-Lambert	2004	1st term
**Stéphane Dion**	Liberal	Saint-Laurent—Cartierville	1996	4th term
Massimo Pacetti	Liberal	Saint-Léonard—Saint-Michel	2002	2nd term
Marcel Gagnon	Bloc Québécois	Saint-Maurice—Champlain	2000	2nd term
Robert Vincent	Bloc Québécois	Shefford	2004	1st term
Serge Cardin	Bloc Québécois	Sherbrooke	1998	3rd term
Diane Bourgeois	Bloc Québécois	Terrebonne—Blainville	2000	2nd term
Paule Brunelle	Bloc Québécois	Trois-Rivières	2004	1st term
Meili Faille	Bloc Québécois	Vaudreuil—Soulanges	2004	1st term
Stéphane Bergeron	Bloc Québécois	Verchères—Les-Patriotes	1993	4th term
Vacant		Verchères—Les-Patriotes	1993	4th term
**Lucienne Robillard**	Liberal	Westmount—Ville-Marie	1995	4th term

=== Saskatchewan ===
Name	Party	Electoral district	First elected / previously elected	No. of terms
Gerry Ritz	Conservative	Battlefords—Lloydminster	1997	3rd term
Lynne Yelich	Conservative	Blackstrap	2000	2nd term
David L. Anderson	Conservative	Cypress Hills—Grasslands	2000	2nd term
Jeremy Harrison	Conservative	Desnethé—Missinippi—Churchill River	2004	1st term
Dave Batters	Conservative	Palliser	2004	1st term
Brian Fitzpatrick	Conservative	Prince Albert	2000	2nd term
Tom Lukiwski	Conservative	Regina—Lumsden—Lake Centre	2004	1st term
Andrew Scheer	Conservative	Regina—Qu'Appelle	2004	1st term
Brad Trost	Conservative	Saskatoon—Humboldt	2004	1st term
Carol Skelton	Conservative	Saskatoon—Rosetown—Biggar	2000	2nd term
Maurice Vellacott	Conservative	Saskatoon—Wanuskewin	1997	3rd term
Ed Komarnicki	Conservative	Souris—Moose Mountain	2004	1st term
**Ralph Goodale**	Liberal	Wascana	1974, (Note: Assiniboia) 1993	5th term*
Garry Breitkreuz	Conservative	Yorkton—Melville	1993	4th term

=== Territories ===
Name	Party	Electoral district	First elected / previously elected	No. of terms
Nancy Karetak-Lindell	Liberal	Nunavut	1997	3rd term
**Ethel Blondin-Andrew**	Liberal	Western Arctic	1988	5th term
Larry Bagnell ‡	Liberal	Yukon	2000	2nd term

== Changes in party affiliation ==
The party standings changed as follows:

Number of members per party by date	2004			2005						
Number of members per party by date	June 28	November 22	December 16	April 12	May 17	May 24	June 6	July 9	October 17	November 9
Liberal	135	134	133	132	133	134	133			
Conservative	99				98					
Bloc Québécois	54									53
New Democratic	19								18	
Independent	1	2		3			4	3	4	
vacant	0		1			0		1		2

Name	Party (new)	Party (when elected)	Details
Carolyn Parrish	Independent	Liberal	Suspended from the Liberal caucus on November 18, 2004. Sat as an Independent starting November 22, 2004.
David Kilgour	Independent	Liberal	Announced on April 12, 2005, that he is leaving the Liberal caucus to sit as an Independent.
Belinda Stronach	Liberal	Conservative	Announced on May 17, 2005, that she is leaving the Conservative caucus to sit as a Liberal MP and a member of the cabinet.
Pat O'Brien	Independent	Liberal	Announced on June 6, 2005 that he is leaving the Liberal caucus to sit as an Independent.
Bev Desjarlais	Independent	New Democratic	Announced on October 17, 2005 that she is leaving the New Democratic caucus to sit as an Independent after losing the nomination in her riding.

== Former members of the 38th Parliament ==
Members of the House of Commons in the 38th Parliament of Canada who left their seats.

Name	Party	Electoral district	Cause of departure	Succeeded by
Lawrence D. O'Brien	Liberal	Labrador	Died December 16, 2004	Todd Russell (Liberal)
Chuck Cadman	Independent	Surrey North	Died July 9, 2005	left vacant due to snap election
Stéphane Bergeron	Bloc Québécois	Verchères—Les-Patriotes	Resigned November 9, 2005	left vacant due to snap election
