= Lucie Pépin =

Canadian nurse and politician

The Honourable Lucie Pépin

Speaker Pro Tempore of the Senate of Canada
- In office October 8, 2002 – October 5, 2004
- Speaker: Dan Hays
- Preceded by: Rose-Marie Losier-Cool
- Succeeded by: Shirley Maheu
Parliamentary constituencies
Canadian Senator from Shawinegan
In office April 8, 1997 – September 7, 2011
Nominated by	Jean Chrétien
Appointed by	Roméo LeBlanc
Preceded by	Maurice Riel
Succeeded by	Ghislain Maltais (2012)
Member of Parliament for Outremont
In office September 4, 1984 – November 21, 1988
Preceded by	Marc Lalonde
Succeeded by	Jean-Pierre Hogue

Personal details
- Born: September 7, 1936 (age 90)
- Party: Liberal

Lucie Pépin (born September 7, 1936) is a Canadian nurse and former politician. Pépin served in both the House of Commons and Senate.

== Career ==
A registered nurse by profession, in the 1960s, Pépin served as head nurse in the gynecology department and then at the family planning clinic of Notre-Dame Hospital in Montreal, and was cross-appointed to the Université de Montréal's faculty of medicine. In the 1970s, she was an administrator at the Canadian Committee for Fertility Research in Montreal, and a lecturer at the Université de Montréal. From 1979 until 1984, Pépin was vice-president and then president of the Canadian Advisory Council on the Status of Women.

== Politics ==
Pépin entered the House of Commons of Canada in the 1984 election when she became the Liberal Member of Parliament for Outremont, Quebec succeeding Marc Lalonde. She was defeated in the 1988 election, during which abortion was a key issue.

From 1993 to 1997, she was a commissioner on the National Parole Board. In 1997, she was appointed to the Senate of Canada on the recommendation of Prime Minister Jean Chrétien, and served as Speaker pro tempore of the Upper House from 2002 to 2004. Until her retirement, she was a member of the Senate Standing Committee on Social Affairs, Science and Technology.

On September 7, 2011, Pépin retired from the Senate upon reaching the mandatory retirement age of 75.

== Notes and references ==
Parliament of Canada
Preceded by Marc Lalonde (Liberal)	Member of Parliament for Outremont; 1984–1988	Succeeded by Jean-Pierre Hogue (PC)
