= Jean-Pierre Hogue =

Canadian politician

Jean-Pierre Hogue (24 November 1927 – 17 June 2012) was a member of the House of Commons of Canada from 1988 to 1993. He was born in Montreal, Quebec. By career, he was a psychologist, professor and writer.

== Political career ==
He was elected in the 1988 federal election at the Outremont electoral district for the Progressive Conservative Party. It was speculated that he won due to the support of ultra-conservative Hasidic Jews abandoning Liberal incumbent Lucie Pépin due to her support for legal abortion. He was the first non-Liberal Member of Parliament elected since the riding's creation in 1935. He served in the 34th Canadian Parliament, supporting the governments led by Prime Ministers Brian Mulroney and Kim Campbell from the back benches, then lost his seat to Liberal Martin Cauchon in a heavy defeat at the 1993 federal election. Hogue finished in a distant third place with just under nine percent of the vote.

Hogue was the guest speaker at the 47th Annual Serbian Day on 28 June 1992 in Niagara Falls, Ontario.

Parliament of Canada
Preceded by Lucie Pépin, Liberal	Member of Parliament for Outremont; 1988 - 1993	Succeeded by Martin Cauchon, Liberal
