= Shirley Maheu =

Canadian politician

The Honourable Shirley Maheu

Speaker Pro Tempore of the Senate of Canada
- In office October 6, 2004 – February 1, 2006
- Speaker: Dan Hays
- Preceded by: Lucie Pépin
- Succeeded by: Rose-Marie Losier-Cool

Deputy Chair of the Committees of the Whole
- In office January 18, 1994 – February 2, 1996
- Speaker: Gilbert Parent
- Preceded by: Steve Paproski (1993)
- Succeeded by: Bob Kilger
Parliamentary constituencies
Canadian Senator from Rougemont
In office February 1, 1996 – February 1, 2006
Nominated by	Jean Chrétien
Appointed by	Roméo LeBlanc
Preceded by	John Sylvain
Succeeded by	Michael Fortier
Member of Parliament for Saint-Laurent—Cartierville (Saint-Laurent; 1988–1993)
In office November 21, 1988 – January 31, 1996
Preceded by	Riding established
Succeeded by	Stéphane Dion

Personal details
- Born: October 7, 1931 Montreal, Quebec, Canada
- Died: February 1, 2006 (aged 74)
- Party: Liberal

Shirley Maheu (October 7, 1931 – February 1, 2006) was a Canadian politician.

A resident of Saint-Laurent, Quebec since 1965, where she operated a successful insurance brokerage firm in partnership with her husband Renė Maheu, Senator Maheu was a founding member of the Saint-Laurent Chamber of Commerce and served as its first Vice-President. She was also active in a number of local and national community groups and charities including Boy Scouts of Canada.

In addition to business and community work, she was an active municipal and federal politician, and served as a Saint-Laurent Municipal Councillor from 1982 to 1988. In the 1988 federal election in November 1988, she was elected to the House of Commons of Canada as the Liberal Member of Parliament for Saint-Laurent, Quebec. Sitting on the opposition bench, she served as the Liberal Critic for Multiculturalism and Citizenship. In September, 1990 she was also appointed Regional Whip for Quebec. Re-elected in the renamed riding of Saint-Laurent—Cartierville during the 1993 election that brought the Liberals to power under Jean Chrétien, she served as Deputy Chair of Committees of the Whole from January 1994 to February 1996, with one of her roles being assistant deputy Speaker of the House of Commons.

In 1996, she was appointed to the Senate of Canada on Chrėtien's recommendation in order to give star candidate Stéphane Dion the opportunity to contest a by-election to fill the vacancy in the House created by Maheu's appointment.

She was active on several Senate committees, including serving as Chair of the Standing Committees on Human Rights and that of Privileges, Standing Rules and Orders. In October 2004, she was appointed Speaker pro tempore of the Senate of Canada.
