= Dan Hays =

Canadian politician

The Honourable Daniel Hays PC OC CD

Speaker of the Senate of Canada
- In office January 26, 2001 – February 7, 2006
- Nominated by: Jean Chrétien
- Speaker Pro Tempore: Rose-Marie Losier-Cool; Lucie Pépin; Shirley Maheu
- Preceded by: Gildas Molgat
- Succeeded by: Noël Kinsella

Leader of the Opposition in the Senate
- In office February 1, 2006 – January 17, 2007
- Prime Minister: Stephen Harper
- Preceded by: Noël Kinsella
- Succeeded by: Céline Hervieux-Payette

Canadian Senator from Alberta
- In office June 29, 1984 – June 30, 2007
- Nominated by: Pierre Trudeau
- Appointed by: Jeanne Sauvé
- Preceded by: Ernest Manning (1983)
- Succeeded by: Bert Brown

Personal details
- Born: Daniel Phillip Hays; April 24, 1939 (age 87) Calgary, Alberta, Canada
- Party: Liberal
- Spouse(s): Kathy Hays; Linda Jolly
- Children: 3
- Parents: Harry Hays (father); Muriel Hays (mother)
- Profession: Lawyer; politician; rancher

Daniel Phillip Hays PC OC CD (April 24, 1939) is a Canadian politician born in Calgary, Alberta. He was Speaker of the Senate of Canada from 2001 to 2006, when he became Leader of the Government (Liberal) in the Senate. Hays was the Leader of the Opposition in the 39th Canadian Parliament (2006–2007), and chair of numerous Senate committees.

== Background ==
He is the only child of Muriel and Harry Hays, who served as Minister of Agriculture in the government of Prime Minister Lester B. Pearson. Dan Hays married Kathy in 2001. He has three daughters from his previous marriage.

Hays attended Western Canada High School, and Strathcona-Tweedsmuir in Calgary, as well as, Appleby College in Oakville. He obtained his B.A. degree in history from the University of Alberta and his LL.B. degree from the University of Toronto. Following his articles, in 1966, with the Calgary-based firm Macleod Dixon, he was called to the Alberta Bar, and became known as a prominent lawyer. Hays was active in various practice areas, most notably corporate, commercial, and international operations. As well, he had a meaningful role in the firm's strategic planning and government relations. He served as Chairman of Macleod Dixon, LLP after his retirement from the Senate. He has been a member of Macleod Dixon, and successor firm Norton Rose Fulbright, for over 50 years.

Hays was appointed to the Senate of Canada by Prime Minister Pierre Trudeau on April 29, 1984, representing Alberta. He chose Calgary as his self-designated senate division. Hays served as Chair of the Senate Standing Committee on Agriculture and Forestry from 1986 to 1988 and again from 1994 to 1995. He was also the chair of the Senate Standing Committee on Energy, the Environment and Natural Resources from 1989 to 1993. He chaired the Committee on Senate Reform, 2006 to 2007. On October 12, 1999, he was appointed Deputy Leader of the Government by Prime Minister Jean Chrétien. Chrétien appointed him as Speaker in January 2001. He is the only Albertan to have held this office.

Hays served as president of the Liberal Party of Canada between 1994 and 1999. He has chaired the party's National Executive Committee and Management Committee, as well as serving as Chair of the Liberal party's Revenue Committee. From 1996 to 1998, he served as Election Readiness Co-chair and National Platform Co-chair for the Liberal party. Hays is also the past Chair of the Canada-Japan Inter-Parliamentary Group and the Canadian section of the Asia-Pacific Parliamentary Forum.

On February 1, 2006, he was named as the Leader of the Opposition in the Senate, replacing Noël Kinsella, a position he held until being succeeded by Céline Hervieux-Payette on January 18, 2007. On January 22, 2007, he was sworn into the Queen's Privy Council for Canada.

Hays officially vacated his Senate seat on June 30, 2007.

Hays served as an Honorary Lieutenant-colonel of The King's Own Calgary Regiment (RCAC) since 2000 with two extensions in 2007 and 2010 as Honorary Colonel of the Regiment. In 2005, he was admitted to the pantheon of l'Order of La Pléiade by the Canadian branch of l’Assemblée Parlementaire de la Francophonie (APF). He also sits on the Advisory Council of the Canadian Defence and Foreign Affairs Institute. In 2018, he was recognized for his exemplary contributions to Alberta and Canada by his alma mater, the University of Alberta, with an honorary degree of Doctor of Laws.

== Honours ==
On April 29, 2000, Hays received Grand Cordon of the Order of the Sacred Treasure from the Emperor of Japan. He was conferred with this honour for promoting Canada/Japan bilateral relations.

In 2007, Hays was appointed by Prime Minister Stephen Harper as member of the Queen's Privy Council of Canada.

In 2011, Hays became an Officier de la Légion d'honneur for his work in furthering Canada's involvement in the Organisation Internationale de Francophonie.

In 2012 He received the Canadian Forces' Decoration (CD) for 12 years service in the Canadian Army.

In 2014, Hays was recognized as a Distinguished Alumni by the University of Alberta.

In 2017, Hays received the Canadian Senate 150th anniversary of Confederation medal from Sen. Art Eggleton.

On November 21, 2018, Hays received an honorary Doctor of Laws degree from the University of Alberta.

In 2019 He was appointed as Officer of the Order of Canada (OC) by Governor General Julie Payette.

Parliament of Canada
Preceded by Harry Hays; Ernest Manning	Senator Alberta; 1984–2007	Succeeded by Bert Brown
Preceded by Gildas Molgat	Speaker of the Senate of Canada; 2001–2006	Succeeded by Noël Kinsella
Preceded by Noël Kinsella	Leader of the Opposition in the Senate of Canada; 2006–2007	Succeeded by Céline Hervieux-Payette
Party political offices
Preceded by Don Johnston	President of the Liberal Party of Canada; 1994–1998	Succeeded by Stephen LeDrew
