= Aurélien Gill =

Canadian businessman, teacher and politician

The Honourable Aurélien Gill CM CQ

Senator from Quebec
- In office September 17, 1998 – August 26, 2008
- Appointed by: Jean Chrétien
- Preceded by: Jacques Hébert
- Succeeded by: Leo Housakos

Personal details
- Born: August 26, 1933 Mashteuiatsh, Quebec, Canada
- Died: January 17, 2015 (aged 81) Roberval, Quebec, Canada
- Party: Liberal
- Education: Université Laval
- Occupation: Businessman, teacher

Aurélien Gill, CM CQ (August 26, 1933 – January 17, 2015) was a Canadian businessman, teacher and politician. Gill served in the Senate of Canada from his appointment in 1998 until his retirement in 2008.

== Early life ==
Born in Mashteuiatsh, the only Native community in Saguenay–Lac-Saint-Jean, Quebec, Gill received a bachelor's degree in pedagogy from Université Laval.

An Aboriginal businessman and advocate, Gill also has a background as a teacher and government administrator having been Quebec Director-General of the Department of Indian and Northern Affairs. He was founding president of the Conseil Attikamek-Montagnais and chief of the Mashteuiatsh Montagnais community from 1975 to 1982 and from 1987 to 1989.

Gill was made a Knight of the National Order of Quebec in 1991.

== Political career ==
Gill ran for a seat to the House of Commons of Canada in the 1993 Canadian federal election. He faced three other candidates in the electoral district of Roberval. Gill was defeated by Bloc Québécois candidate Michel Gauthier finishing second, he also finished ahead of future Member of Parliament Alain Giguère who finished a distant fourth place.

He was appointed to the Senate on the advice of Prime Minister Jean Chrétien on September 17, 1998. He sat as a Liberal representing the Quebec senatorial district of Wellington. He retired from the Senate on his 75th birthday on August 26, 2008. Gill died on January 17, 2015.
