= Leo Housakos =

Canadian politician (born 1968)

The Honourable Leo Housakos
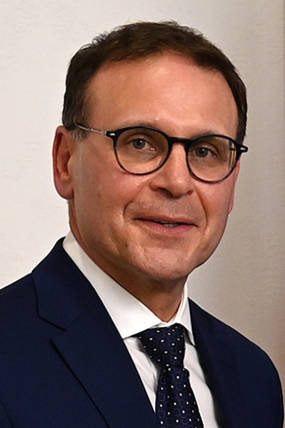
- Housakos in 2023

Leader of the Opposition in the Senate
- Incumbent
- Assumed office May 14, 2025
- Leader: Pierre Poilievre
- Preceded by: Don Plett

Canadian Senator from Quebec (Wellington)
- Incumbent
- Assumed office January 8, 2009
- Nominated by: Stephen Harper
- Appointed by: Michaëlle Jean
- Preceded by: Aurélien Gill

Speaker of the Senate of Canada
- In office May 4, 2015 – December 3, 2015 (Acting: April 24, 2015 – May 4, 2015)
- Nominated by: Stephen Harper
- Appointed by: David Johnston
- Preceded by: Pierre Claude Nolin
- Succeeded by: George Furey

Deputy Whip of the Opposition
- In office 2016 – May 14, 2025

Personal details
- Born: January 10, 1968 (age 58) Montreal, Quebec, Canada
- Party: Conservative (federal); Conservative (Quebec)
- Other political affiliations: Progressive Conservative (before 2000); Canadian Alliance (2000–2003)
- Spouse: Demi Papapanagiotou
- Children: Peter and Tasso
- Education: McGill University (BA)
- Profession: Businessman

Leonidas Housakos (born January 10, 1968) is a Canadian politician who has served as the senator for Wellington, Quebec since January 8, 2009. A member of the Conservative Party, Housakos was appointed on the advice of Prime Minister Stephen Harper. Housakos served as the speaker of the Senate for part of 2015. In May 2025, he was appointed Leader of the Opposition in the Senate.

== Background ==
Housakos was born in Montreal, Quebec into a Greek family. He graduated from McGill University with a Bachelor of Arts in 1992 and worked as a ministerial staffer in the Ministry of Multiculturalism under Gerry Weiner. Soon after, he became involved with the Hellenic Congress of Quebec and served two terms as its Vice-President, National Issues between 1998 and 2000.

Prior to entry to politics, Housakos worked as the president of Terrau Inc., the presidency of Quadvision International and Sales at Constant Laboratories. He was also a member of the North America Advisory Board for the Alexander Proudfoot Company, an organization specializing in the productivity of corporations.

He co-founded the Hellenic Board of Trade in 1993, an organization dedicated to the development of business opportunities and networking in the Greater Montreal Area. Housakos was an advisor to the Mayor of Montreal between 2001 and 2002. In 2007, he was appointed to the Board of Directors of Via Rail and served for a year.

== Political career ==
Housakos began his political involvement in 1993 as a field organizer for Jean Charest in Montreal back when Charest ran for leadership for the Progressive Conservative Party of Canada.

Housakos served as a co-chair on Pierre Poilievre’s leadership campaign for the Conservative Party of Canada in 2022.

He was a candidate for the Canadian Alliance in the 2000 federal election, in the riding of Laval West, where he has lived for over twenty years.

For several year Leo Housakos acted as the head of the Action démocratique du Québec's fundraising arm, a provincial party in Quebec whose leader, Mario Dumont, campaigned for the "Yes" side during the 1995 referendum in Quebec along with Parti Québécois and Bloc Québécois. The "No" side was led by Jean Charest, the then leader of the Progressive Conservative Party of Canada, Jean Chrétien, the then leader of the Liberal Party of Canada and Daniel Johnson, the then leader of the Liberal Party of Quebec.

=== Senator ===
Housakos was appointed to the Canadian Senate by Prime Minister Stephen Harper on December 22, 2008, as a member of the Conservative Party of Canada promising to uphold the limit of 8 years for Senate appointees.

==== Corruption allegations ====
Housakos served as the president of the fundraising committee of the Action démocratique du Québec. In October 2013, a witness with the Charbonneau Commission insinuated to the CBC that Housakos gave him illegal contributions collected in 2008 in favour of the party. Housakos denied any wrongdoing, describing the allegations as "a hatchet job of the worst degree." The Charbonneau Commission has long since completed its work and released its report. The false allegations were proven untrue and Housakos' name does not appear anywhere in the report.

In December 2017, The Globe and Mail reported that Housakos, along with Senator Victor Oh and Don Plett, were subject to a Senate ethics probe regarding an all-expenses-paid trip to China without declaring it as a sponsored travel or a gift. In February 2020, the Ethics Officer released his report and reiterated that Housakos and Plett were not the subjects of his investigation and that they were exonerated on the basis that Senator Oh had not made them aware of the source of funding for the trip.

In 2006, during an informal meeting with the former chief of staff to Public Works Minister Michael Fortier, Leo Housakos raised the possibility of the department's dropping its plan to reclaim a building complex from the Rosdev Group. Housakos hoped Rosdev's president, Michael Rosenberg, would become a strong ally for the party, especially within Montreal's Jewish community. So he argued at the time that the ministerial staffer should help Rosdev "get a fair hearing" in an effort to help the party. Rosdev faced the loss of a $50-million complex because Ottawa planned to exercise an option to claim the complex for $0 in 2010.

==== Sponsored legislation ====
In the 43rd Canadian Parliament (2019 to 2021), Housakos introduce Bill S-221 which, if approved, would have inserted a provision into the Criminal Code to make committing mischief in relation to a monument or similar structure that honours first responders an indictable offence subject to specified minimum fines and imprisonment.

In the 44th Canadian Parliament, he introduced Bill S-204, seeking to block all imports from China's Xinjiang region, citing allegations from human rights organizations that members of the Uyghurs and other Turkic minorities are subject to forced labour as part of the Communist government's plan to control the population.

==== Speakership ====
He was appointed acting speaker of the Senate on April 24, 2015, following the death of Pierre Claude Nolin. On May 4, 2015, he was appointed as Pierre Claude Nolin's successor permanently. He was succeeded as Speaker by Senator George Furey on December 3, 2015, on Furey's appointment to the position by Prime Minister Justin Trudeau.

=== Opposition leader ===
He was appointed leader of the Opposition in the Senate on May 14, 2025, following the retirement of Don Plett. During his tenure, there has been a wave of defections from other parties to the Conservative caucus.

== Political stances ==
=== Official bilingualism ===
Breaking ranks with his party in September 2011, Housakos was the first Conservative Party parliamentarian to openly and publicly oppose the nomination of unilingual Michael Ferguson as Auditor General of Canada, stating, "there are certain positions in the federal government that are so symbolic to what Canada is all about and I just believe they have to be filled by people who are functionally bilingual." Arguing that the appointment sets a dangerous precedent that threatens bilingualism in Canada, he said, "I think that bilingualism is so fundamental to this country, not just from the point of view of national unity, but I think it’s a tool that should be used as a positive attribute, both in terms of our diplomatic strategies and our commercial strategies around the world."

=== Multiculturalism ===
In October 2012, Housakos published The Challenges of Integration and Multiculturalism, where he voices concerns regarding the difficulties recent immigrants have had in being both accepted and integrated within North American society and, more specifically, the challenges the Muslim communities after 9/11. He argues that the Canadian government should provide prospective new immigrants a clear understanding of the norms and values of their adoptive new home, because Canada is a country based on the separation of Church and state and the equality of men and women.

Housakos published Multiculturalism's an Outdated Insult, in March 2013, where he argues that official Multiculturalism became a state-financed marketing program where the government uses tax dollars to buy photo ops with ethnic leaders. He suggested that multiculturalism should be replaced with a policy of integration.

=== Charter of Quebec Values ===
Housakos later spoke out against the Parti Québécois government's Charter of Quebec Values, on the basis that it negates respect for individual rights.

"Other than just a political ploy on the part of the Parti Québécois to chase down nationalist votes that have maybe left to go to other more radical nationalist parties in the last couple of elections, there's no other benefit (from introducing a new charter)," said Housakos. "So the only people that see a need for this is the Parti Québécois. And the need is for political expediency."

=== Foreign policies ===
In December 2019, Housakos and Senator Thanh Hai Ngo tabled a motion to sanction Chinese officials on actions in Hong Kong and Xinjiang, citing their concern for "violation of human rights Hong Kong" and for the "treatment of minority Muslims in China".

=== A Digital Plan for Canada ===
Commenting on the release of the report, Housakos said, "We need a multi-targeted policy approach to prepare the way for a digital society. We need a principle of true universality to avoid the creation of 'information haves' and 'information have-nots'." NDP industry critic Brian Masse welcomed the report, insisting a national digital policy was overdue for Canadians and contained many ideas his party wants to explore further.

== Personal life ==
Housakos is married to Demi Papapanagiotou; they have two children.

=== Community involvement ===
Housakos does charity work for the American Hellenic Educational Progressive Association (AHEPA), where they help raise funds for children's causes in the Montreal area. He helped to organize a charity ball for Giant Steps, an association dedicated to helping autistic children. He has also been coaching a youth hockey team for over 10 years. In 2009, his team became the champions of the 33rd Brossard Provincial Atom hockey tournament.

Political offices
Preceded by Pierre Claude Nolin	Speaker of the Senate of Canada; 2015	Succeeded by George Furey
