= Pierre Claude Nolin =

Canadian politician (1950–2015)

The Honourable Pierre Claude Nolin
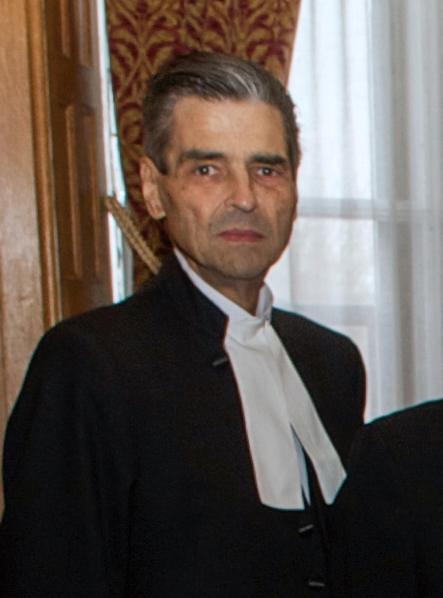
- Nolin in 2014

Speaker of the Senate
- In office November 27, 2014 – April 23, 2015
- Nominated by: Stephen Harper
- Appointed by: David Johnston
- Preceded by: Noël Kinsella
- Succeeded by: Leo Housakos

Senator for De Salaberry, Quebec
- In office June 18, 1993 – April 23, 2015
- Nominated by: Brian Mulroney
- Appointed by: Ray Hnatyshyn
- Preceded by: Jean-Marie Poitras
- Succeeded by: André Pratte

Personal details
- Born: October 30, 1950 Montreal, Quebec, Canada
- Died: April 23, 2015 (aged 64) Ottawa, Ontario, Canada
- Party: Progressive Conservative (1993–2004); Conservative (2004–2015)
- Spouse: Camille Desjardins
- Children: 3
- Education: University of Ottawa

Pierre Claude Nolin (October 30, 1950 – April 23, 2015) was a Canadian politician and senator. A prominent member of the Conservative Party of Canada from 2004 until his death, he became an influential figure in the Party's parliamentary caucus.

Appointed to the Canadian senate on recommendation of Brian Mulroney on 1993, he was designated as speaker pro tempore in 2013 before being promoted to the office of speaker of the Senate in November 2014. He held the office until his death on April 23, 2015.

== Life before politics ==
Nolin was born in Montreal, Quebec, and attended the University of Ottawa. He received a law degree in 1975. In 1976, Nolin married Camille Desjardins, with whom he had three children, Simon, Louis and Virginie.

== Quebec senator ==
Nolin was appointed to the Senate of Canada on the recommendation of Prime Minister Brian Mulroney on June 18, 1993. He had been an influential supporter of Mulroney in Quebec politics since 1976, when Mulroney made his first attempt at becoming the Progressive Conservative Party's leader.

For ten years, Nolin worked actively as a high-profile member of the Progressive Conservative Senate caucus. In 2002, Nolin chaired the Canadian Senate Special Committee on Illegal Drugs and supporting its recommendations to legalize but not decriminalize the use of marijuana in Canada. Nolin supported the merger of the Progressive Conservative Party and the Canadian Alliance in 2003 that ultimately created the Conservative Party of Canada (CPC). Nolin supported auto-parts magnate Belinda Stronach during the 2004 CPC leadership election.

Between former Tory MP André Bachand's departure from politics in June 2004 and January 2006, Nolin surreptitiously became the "Quebec strongman" in the new Conservative Party's parliamentary caucus. Nolin is largely seen as an influential Red Tory, which is in line with most of the Conservatives who have come from Quebec in recent decades.

In January 2005, Nolin announced that the Quebec wing of the CPC would be introducing several "moderate" principles to the March 2005 CPC Policy Convention in Montreal, including a motion to support the rights of married same-sex couples to equal status in the courts of law. Many of the new Tory party's Quebec-wing motions passed, but with amendments. In the 2006 Canadian federal election, the new Tories managed to elect 10 members from Quebec, which was the party's best showing since 1988.

Nolin was elected speaker pro tempore of the Canadian Senate on November 20, 2013. He was then appointed speaker of the Senate by Prime Minister Stephen Harper effective November 27, 2014, as a result of the retirement of his predecessor, Noël Kinsella.

== Illness and death ==
Nolin was diagnosed with a rare form of cancer in 2010. He died on April 23, 2015, at the age of 64 from pancreatic cancer. Nolin's funeral was held at Montreal's Notre-Dame Basilica.

Senator Leo Housakos would continue in the role as acting Speaker of the Senate until a new person is appointed. On May 4, 2015, Housakos was appointed as Pierre Claude Nolin's successor permanently.

Political offices
Preceded by Noël Kinsella	Speaker of the Senate of Canada; 2014–2015	Succeeded by Leo Housakos (acting)
