= Rose-Marie Losier-Cool =

Canadian politician (born 1937)

The Honourable Rose-Marie Losier-Cool

Speaker Pro Tempore of the Senate of Canada
- In office November 17, 1999 – October 7, 2002
- Speaker: Gildas Molgat; Dan Hays
- Preceded by: Gerry Ottenheimer
- Succeeded by: Lucie Pépin

Government Whip in the Senate
- In office January 15, 2004 – February 5, 2006
- Prime Minister: Jean Chrétien
- Leader: Jack Austin
- Preceded by: Bill Rompkey
- Succeeded by: Terry Stratton

Canadian Senator from Tracadie
- In office March 21, 1995 – June 18, 2012
- Nominated by: Jean Chrétien
- Appointed by: Roméo LeBlanc
- Preceded by: Roméo LeBlanc
- Succeeded by: Paul McIntyre

Personal details
- Born: June 18, 1937 (age 88) Tracadie, New Brunswick, Canada
- Party: Liberal

Rose-Marie Losier-Cool (born June 18, 1937) is a retired Canadian Senator for New Brunswick.

A member of New Brunswick's Acadian community, Losier-Cool worked as a teacher for thirty-three years, two decades of which were spent at École secondaire Népisiguit in Bathurst, New Brunswick.

She was elected the first woman president of the Association des enseignantes et des enseignants francophones du Nouveau-Brunswick in 1983 and has sat on the board of directors of the Canadian Teachers' Federation. She was awarded the Teacher of the Year Award for non-sexist teaching by the government of New Brunswick in 1993. In 1994–95, she was Vice-President of the New Brunswick Advisory Council on the Status of Women.

Losier-Cool was appointed to the Senate on March 21, 1995 on the advice of then Prime Minister of Canada Jean Chrétien and sits as a Liberal. In January 2004, she was appointed Government Whip in the Senate, the first woman ever to hold this role. Loisier-Cool left the Senate upon reaching the mandatory retirement age of 75 on June 18, 2012.
