= Speaker pro tempore of the Senate of Canada =

- Président(e) intérimaire du Sénat du Canada
- Incumbent; René Cormier since June 5, 2025
- Senate of Canada
- Style: The Honourable
- Appointer: The governor general
- Term length: At His Majesty's pleasure
- Salary: $207,000 (2024)
- Website: sencanada.ca/en/senators/ringuette-pierrette/

The Speaker pro tempore (French: Président(e) intérimaire) is an officer and second-highest ranking member of the Senate of Canada. The Speaker Pro Tempore ("acting Speaker") is a member of the Senate who is first nominated by a selection committee. The nomination is then confirmed through a vote in the Senate. The Speaker Pro Tempore serves whenever the Speaker of the Senate of Canada, who is appointed by the government, is unable to attend a sitting of the Senate.

== List of speakers pro tempore of the Senate ==
The following is the list of speakers pro tempore of the Senate of Canada.

No.	Portrait	Name (Birth–Death)	Term of office		Party
No.	Portrait	Name (Birth–Death)	Took office	Left office	Party
1		Renaude Lapointe; Senator for Mille Isles, Quebec (1912–2002)	June 9, 1982	November 30, 1983	Liberal
2		Gildas Molgat; Senator for Saint Rose, Manitoba (1927–2001)	December 19, 1983	July 9, 1984	Liberal
3		Martial Asselin; Senator for Stadacona, Quebec (1924–2013)	November 13, 1984	October 1, 1988	Progressive Conservative
(2)		Gildas Molgat; Senator for Saint Rose, Manitoba (1927–2001)	December 29, 1988	May 12, 1991	Liberal
4		Rhéal Bélisle; Senator for Sudbury, Ontario (1919–1992)	May 28, 1991	November 3, 1992	Progressive Conservative
5		Gerry Ottenheimer; Senator for Waterford-Trinity, Newfoundland and Labrador (1934–1998)	December 7, 1992	January 18, 1998	Progressive Conservative
6		Rose-Marie Losier-Cool; Senator for Tracadie, New Brunswick (born 1937)	November 17, 1999	October 2, 2002	Liberal
7		Lucie Pépin; Senator for Shawinegan, Quebec (born 1936)	October 8, 2002	October 5, 2004	Liberal
8		Shirley Maheu; Senator for Rougemont, Quebec (1931–2006)	October 6, 2004	February 1, 2006	Liberal
(6)		Rose-Marie Losier-Cool; Senator for Tracadie, New Brunswick (born 1937)	April 6, 2006	March 3, 2010	Liberal
9		Donald Oliver; Senator for South Shore, Nova Scotia (born 1938)	March 4, 2010	November 16, 2013	Conservative
10		Pierre Claude Nolin; Senator for De Salaberry, Quebec (1950–2015)	November 20, 2013	November 26, 2014	Conservative
11		Leo Housakos; Senator for Wellington, Quebec (born 1968)	December 2, 2014	May 3, 2015	Conservative
12		Nicole Eaton; Senator for Ontario (born 1945)	December 9, 2015	September 11, 2019	Conservative
13		Pierrette Ringuette; Senator for New Brunswick (born 1955)	May 1, 2020	June 5, 2025	Independent Senators Group
14		René Cormier; Senator for New Brunswick (born 1956)	June 5, 2025	Incumbent	Independent Senators Group

== See also ==
- President pro tempore of the United States Senate
- President of the Senate (Australia)
- Speaker of the House of Commons (Canada)
