= Speaker of the Senate of Canada =

Presiding officer of the Senate of Canada

- Président du Sénat du Canada
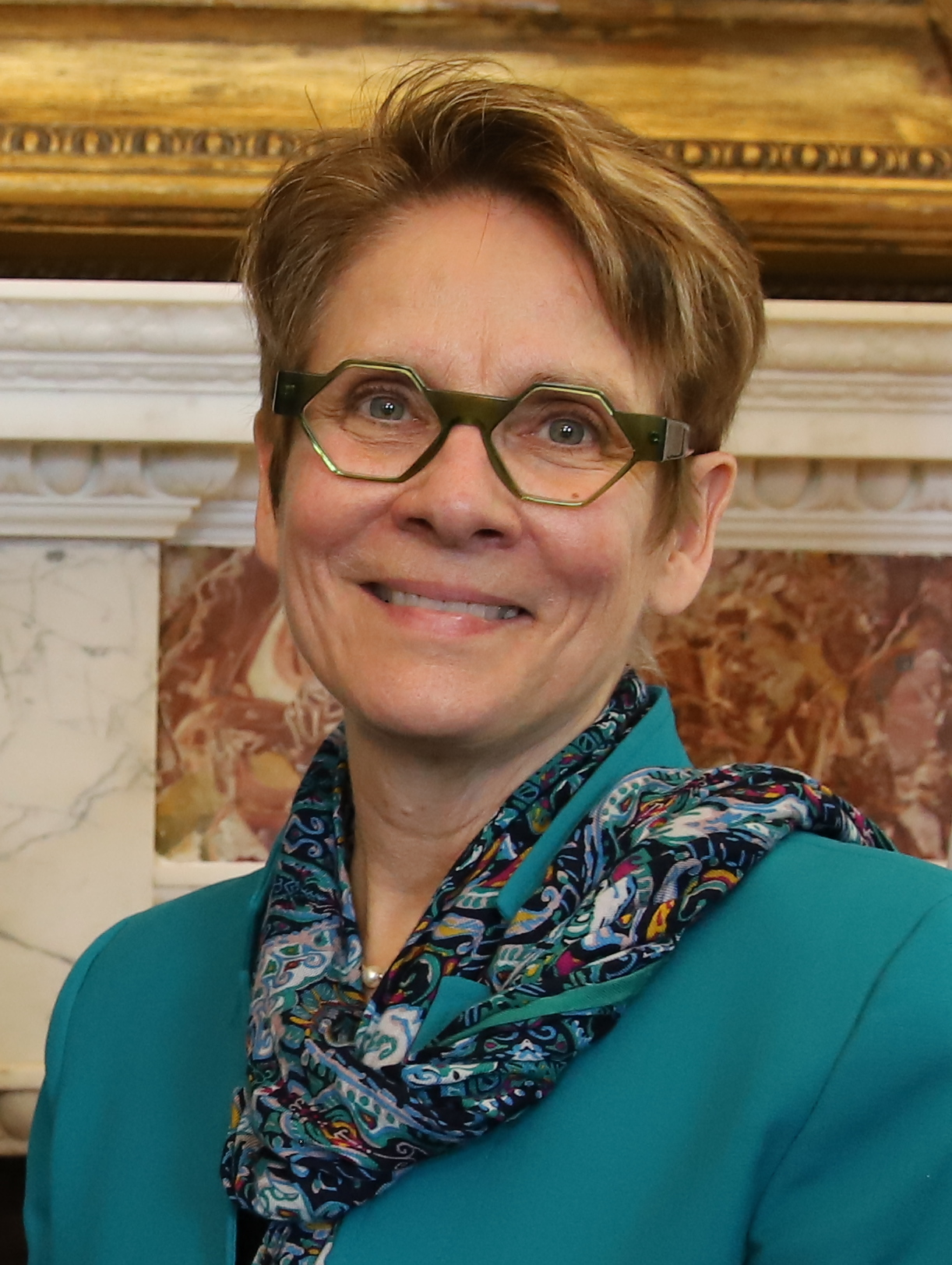
- Incumbent; Raymonde Gagné since May 16, 2023
- Senate of Canada
- Style: The Honourable
- Appointer: The governor general on the advice of the prime minister
- Term length: At His Majesty's pleasure
- Inaugural holder: Joseph-Édouard Cauchon
- Formation: November 5, 1867
- Salary: $248,700 (2024)
- Website: sencanada.ca/en/speakers/raymonde-gagne/biography/

The speaker of the Senate of Canada (French: président du Sénat du Canada) is the presiding officer of the Senate of Canada. The speaker represents the Senate at official functions, rules on questions of parliamentary procedure and parliamentary privilege, and presides over debates and voting in the chamber. The office of the speaker is held by Raymonde Gagné who has held the position since May 16, 2023.

== Appointment and precedence ==
By convention, the speaker of the Senate is appointed by the governor general on the advice of the prime minister.

The speaker of the Senate takes precedence only after the monarch, the governor general, members of the Canadian Royal Family, former governors general and their spouses, the prime minister, former prime ministers, and the chief justice of Canada in the Canadian Order of Precedence.

== History of the speaker ==
The role of the speaker in the Senate was originally based on that of the lord chancellor in the United Kingdom, who presided over the British House of Lords. In keeping with the role of the lord chancellor, the speaker of the Senate was expected to be partisan; the speaker of the Senate would, at all times, have the right to leave the chair, to participate in debates, and to hold an original vote—unlike the speaker of the House of Commons, who has a vote only in the event of a tie.

The speaker of the Senate was also similar to the lord chancellor in being considered equal to other senators. Decisions of the chair were not binding on the Senate unless the speaker's decision was also the pleasure of a majority of senators. Also similar to the practice of the House of Lords was that the speaker would not intervene unless another senator brought a matter to the attention of the speaker. Decisions from the chair remain subject to appeals from the Senate.

Canada has more recently departed from the traditions of the House of Lords, notably since 1991, when new rules for the Senate were adopted. The new Standing Orders have made it clear that the speaker of the Senate could intervene without being called to do so by the Senate. The new guidelines move the Senate further from the model of the self-governing practices of the House of Lords, and more toward the chair-governed customs of the House of Commons.

The position was preceded by the speaker of the Legislative Council of the Province of Canada.

== Role of the speaker ==
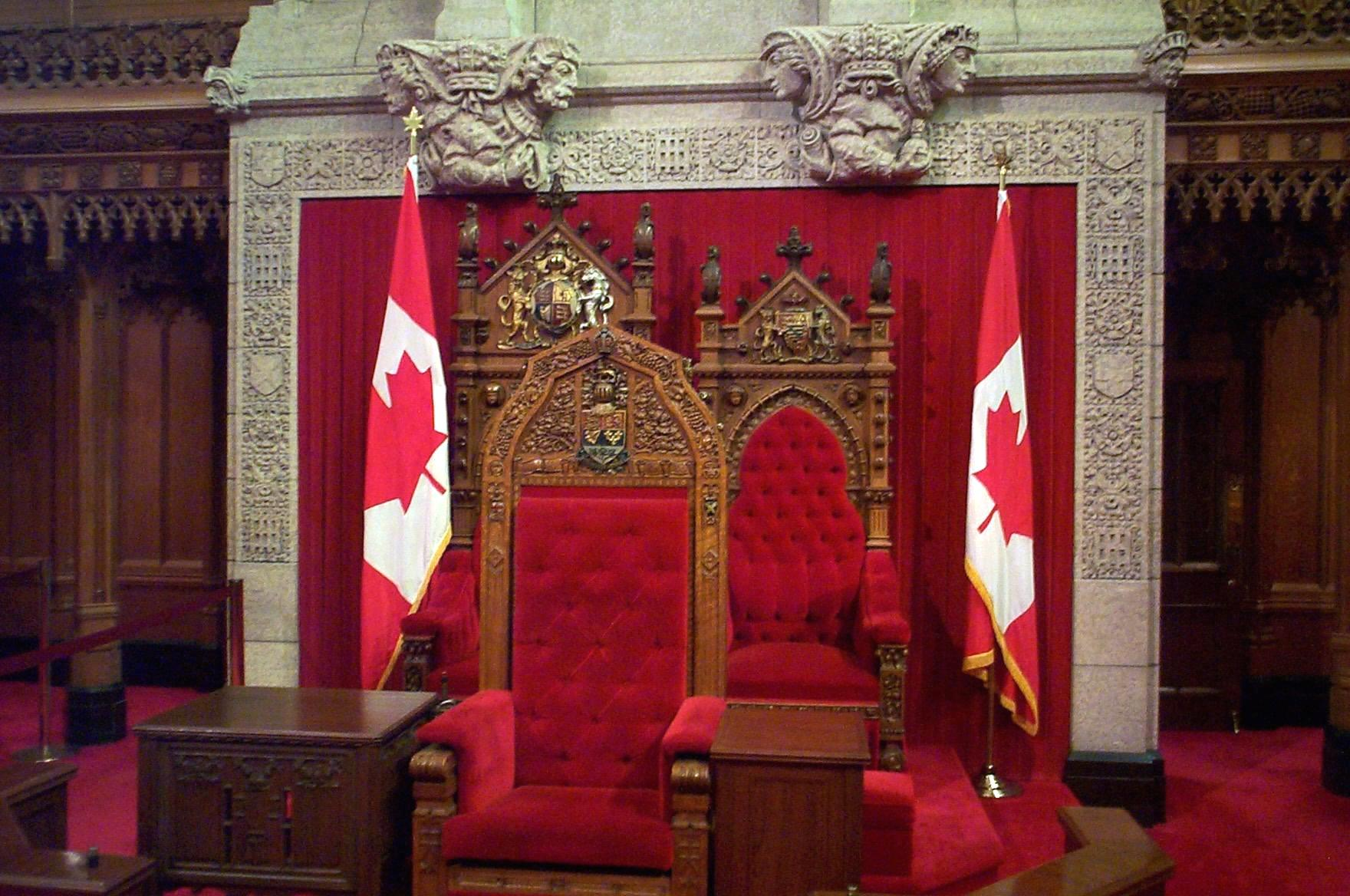
The Speaker of the Senate occupies the chair in front of the thrones.

The speaker of the Senate is historically responsible for deciding on points of order, only once risen by another senator. However, with the 1991 amendments to the Standing Orders and Guidelines that govern the Senate of Canada, the speakership has generally begun to assert its right to intervene, where appropriate, without being prompted to do so. Therefore, the speaker is, broadly speaking, responsible for the maintenance of order and decorum in the Senate.

As a high-ranking individual on the order of precedence, the speaker of the Senate often receives visiting heads of state and heads of government — this role is not merely ceremonial; the speaker is a real delegate and representative of Canada abroad. They are expected to represent Canada internationally, and sometimes visit other nations on behalf of the Government of Canada.

While the speaker is an officer of the Senate, the speaker as a senator also remains a representative of the province or territory from which they were appointed. Unlike the speaker of the House of Commons, the speaker of the Senate has the right to participate in debates. The speaker has the right and power to cast an original vote, and to simultaneously preside over the voting process (rather than the speaker merely delivering a tie-breaking vote).

Another significant difference between the two speakers is that the speaker of the House of Commons holds a management role within the administration of the House of Commons and chairs the Board of Internal Economy. The speaker of the Senate holds no similar role, as the Senate's Standing Committee on Internal Economy, Budgets, and Administration is chaired by another senator.

In the absence of the speaker in the chamber, their duties are carried by the speaker pro tempore, a senator appointed at the beginning of each session by the Senate. Should both chair officers be absent, any senator can be called upon to take the chair. Irrespective of who is in the chair, their decisions hold the same force as that of the speaker of the Senate.

== Ceremony ==
The speaker of the Senate performs the Senate Speaker's Parade to mark the opening of a sitting in the Senate with the help of the Black Rod.

== List of speakers of the Senate ==
Key:

Liberal Party of Canada
Historical Conservative parties (including Liberal-Conservative, Conservative (Historical), Nationalist Conservative, Progressive Conservative)
Conservative Party of Canada
Independent

No.	Portrait	Name (Birth–Death)	Term of office		Party
No.	Portrait	Name (Birth–Death)	Took office	Left office	Party
1		Joseph-Édouard Cauchon; Senator for Stadacona, Quebec (1816–1885)	November 5, 1867	May 16, 1869	Independent; Conservative
2		John Ross; Senator for Ontario (1818–1871)	May 17, 1869	May 26, 1869	Conservative
(1)		Joseph-Édouard Cauchon; Senator for Stadacona, Quebec (1816–1885)	May 27, 1869	June 2, 1872	Independent; Conservative
3		Amos Edwin Botsford; Senator for New Brunswick (1804–1894)	June 3, 1872	June 5, 1872	Conservative
(1)		Joseph-Édouard Cauchon; Senator for Stadacona, Quebec (1816–1885)	June 6, 1872	June 30, 1872	Independent; Conservative
4		Pierre-Joseph-Olivier Chauveau; Senator for Stadacona, Quebec (1820–1890)	February 21, 1873	January 8, 1874	Conservative
5		David Christie; Senator for Erie, Ontario (1818–1880)	January 9, 1874	October 16, 1878	Liberal
6		Robert Duncan Wilmot; Senator for New Brunswick (1809–1891)	November 7, 1878	February 10, 1880	Conservative
7		David Lewis Macpherson; Senator for Saugeen, Ontario (1818–1896)	February 11, 1880	February 15, 1880	Conservative
(3)		Amos Edwin Botsford; Senator for New Brunswick (1804–1894)	February 16, 1880	April 18, 1880	Conservative
(7)		David Lewis Macpherson; Senator for Saugeen, Ontario (1818–1896)	April 19, 1880	October 16, 1883	Conservative
8		William Miller; Senator for Richmond, Nova Scotia (1835–1912)	October 17, 1883	April 3, 1887	Liberal- Conservative
9		Josiah Burr Plumb; Senator for Ontario (1816–1888)	April 4, 1887	March 12, 1888	Conservative
10		George William Allan; Senator for York, Ontario (1822–1901)	March 17, 1888	April 26, 1891	Conservative
11		Alexandre Lacoste; Senator for De Lorimier, Quebec (1842–1923)	April 27, 1891	September 13, 1891	Conservative
12		John Jones Ross; Senator for De la Durantaye, Quebec (1831–1901)	September 14, 1891	July 12, 1896	Conservative
13		Charles Alphonse Pantaléon Pelletier; Senator for Grandville, Quebec (1837–1911)	July 13, 1896	January 28, 1901	Liberal
14		Lawrence Geoffrey Power; Senator for Halifax, Nova Scotia (1841–1921)	January 29, 1901	January 8, 1905	Liberal
15		Raoul Dandurand; Senator for De Lorimier, Quebec (1861–1942)	January 9, 1905	January 13, 1909	Liberal
16		James Kirkpatrick Kerr; Senator for Toronto, Ontario (1841–1916)	January 14, 1909	October 22, 1911	Liberal
17		Auguste Charles Philippe Robert Landry; Senator for Stadacona, Quebec (1846–1919)	October 23, 1911	June 2, 1916	Conservative
18		Joseph Bolduc; Senator for Lauzon, Quebec (1847–1924)	June 3, 1916	February 6, 1922	Nationalist; Conservative
19		Hewitt Bostock; Senator for Kamloops, British Columbia (1864–1930)	February 7, 1922	May 12, 1930	Liberal
20		Arthur Charles Hardy; Senator for Leeds, Ontario (1872–1962)	May 13, 1930	September 2, 1930	Liberal
21		Pierre-Édouard Blondin; Senator for The Laurentides, Quebec (1874–1943)	September 3, 1930	January 10, 1936	Conservative
22		Walter Edward Foster; Senator for Saint John, New Brunswick (1873–1947)	January 11, 1936	May 8, 1940	Liberal
23		Georges Parent; Senator for Kennebec, Quebec (1879–1942)	May 9, 1940	December 14, 1942	Liberal
24		Thomas Vien; Senator for De Lorimier, Quebec (1881–1972)	January 23, 1943	August 23, 1945	Liberal
25		James Horace King; Senator for Kootenay East, British Columbia (1873–1955)	August 24, 1945	August 2, 1949	Liberal
26		Élie Beauregard; Senator for Rougemont, Quebec (1884–1954)	August 3, 1949	October 13, 1953	Liberal
27		Wishart McLea Robertson; Senator for Shelburne, Nova Scotia (1891–1967)	October 14, 1953	October 3, 1957	Liberal
28		Mark Robert Drouin; Senator for La Salle, Quebec (1903–1963)	October 4, 1957	September 23, 1962	Progressive; Conservative
29		George Stanley White; Senator for Hastings–Frontenac, Ontario (1897–1977)	September 24, 1962	April 26, 1963	Progressive; Conservative
30		Maurice Bourget; Senator for The Laurentides, Quebec (1907–1979)	April 27, 1963	January 6, 1966	Liberal
31		Sydney John Smith; Senator for Kamloops, British Columbia (1892–1976)	January 7, 1966	September 4, 1968	Liberal
32		Jean-Paul Deschatelets; Senator for Lauzon, Quebec (1912–1986)	September 5, 1968	December 13, 1972	Liberal
33		Muriel McQueen Fergusson; Senator for Frederickton, New Brunswick (1899–1997)	December 14, 1972	September 11, 1974	Liberal
34		Renaude Lapointe; Senator for Mille Isles, Quebec (1912–2002)	September 12, 1974	October 4, 1979	Liberal
35		Allister Grosart; Senator for Pickering, Ontario (1906–1984)	October 5, 1979	March 3, 1980	Progressive; Conservative
36		Jean Marchand; Senator for De la Vallière, Quebec (1918–1998)	March 4, 1980	December 15, 1983	Liberal
37		Maurice Riel; Senator for Shawinegan, Quebec (1922–2007)	December 16, 1983	November 1, 1984	Liberal
38		Guy Charbonneau; Senator for Kennebec, Quebec (1922–1998)	November 2, 1984	December 6, 1993	Progressive; Conservative
39		Roméo LeBlanc; Senator for Beauséjour, New Brunswick (1927–2009)	December 7, 1993	November 21, 1994	Liberal
40		Gildas Molgat; Senator for Saint Rose, Manitoba (1927–2001)	November 22, 1994	January 25, 2001	Liberal
41		Dan Hays; Senator for Calgary, Alberta (born 1939)	January 26, 2001	February 7, 2006	Liberal
42		Noël Kinsella; Senator for Fredericton–York–Sunbury, New Brunswick (1939–2023)	February 8, 2006	November 26, 2014	Conservative
43		Pierre Claude Nolin; Senator for De Salaberry, Quebec (1950–2015)	November 27, 2014	April 23, 2015	Conservative
44		Leo Housakos; Senator for Wellington, Quebec (born 1968)	April 24, 2015	December 2, 2015	Conservative
45		George Furey; Senator for Newfoundland and Labrador (born 1948)	December 3, 2015	May 12, 2023	Independent
46		Raymonde Gagné; Senator for Manitoba (born 1956)	May 16, 2023	Incumbent	Independent

Hays, Housakos, and Furey are the only current living former speakers of the Senate.

Several speakers have died during their time in office:

- Josiah Burr Plumb, 1888
- Hewitt Bostock, 1930
- Georges Parent, 1942
- Pierre Claude Nolin, 2015
