= 41st Canadian Parliament =

2011–15 legislative term

- Majority parliament
- Jun. 2, 2011 – Aug. 2, 2015
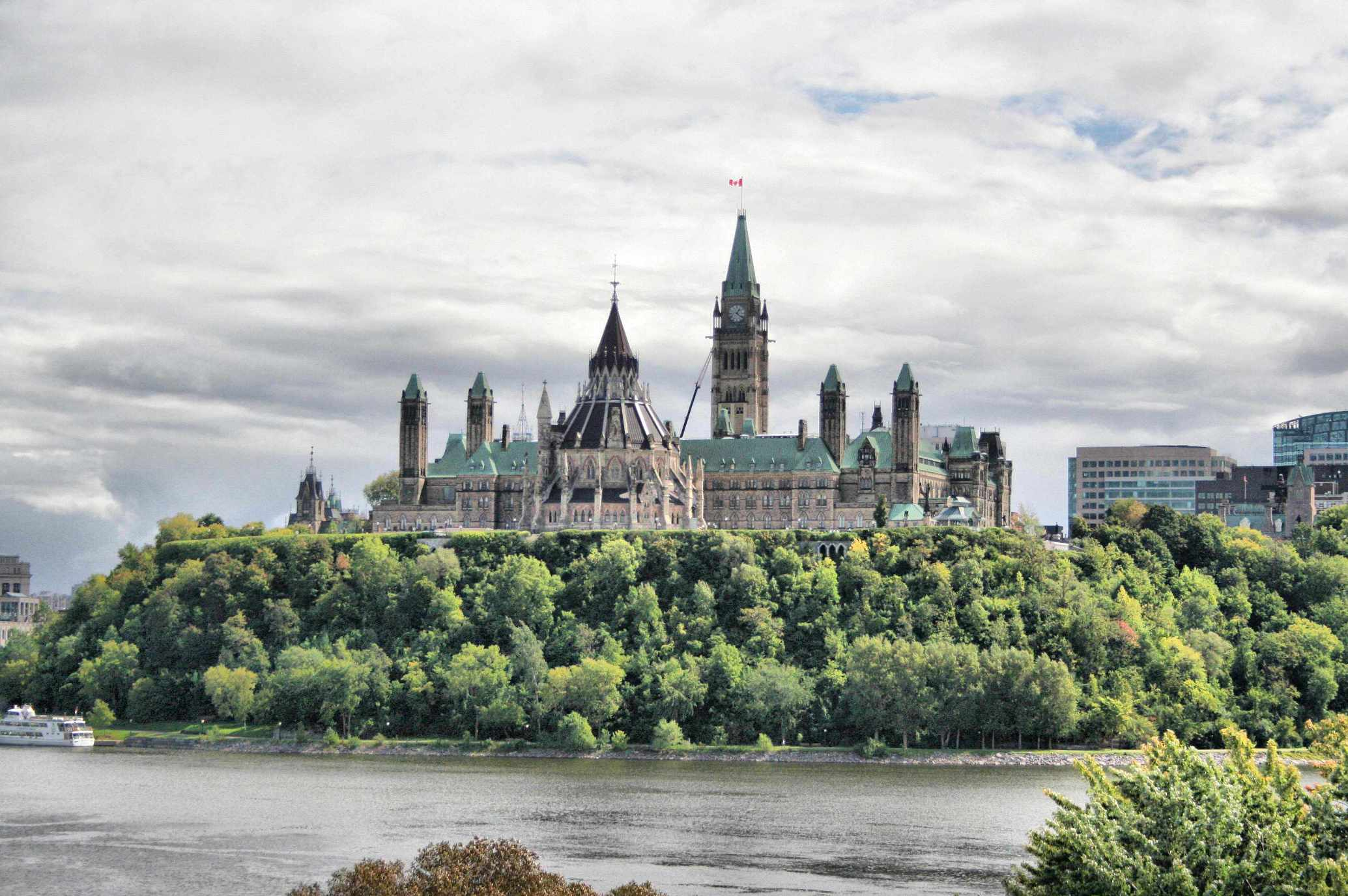
- Canadian Parliament (2013)

Parliament leaders
- Prime minister: Rt. Hon. Stephen Harper; Feb. 6, 2006 – Nov. 4, 2015
- Cabinet: 28th Canadian Ministry
- Leader of the Opposition: Hon. Jack Layton; May 2, 2011 – August 22, 2011 (His death)
- Nycole Turmel; August 23, 2011 – March 23, 2012
- Hon. Thomas Mulcair; March 24, 2012 – November 4, 2015

Party caucuses
- Government: Conservative
- Opposition: New Democratic
- Senate Opp.: Senate Liberal Caucus* (from 2014)
- Recognized: Liberal
- Unrecognized: Bloc Québécois
- Green
- Strength in Democracy (from 2014)
- Progressive Conservative* (until 2013)
- * Only in the Senate.

House of Commons
- Seating arrangements of the House of Commons
- Speaker of the Commons: Hon. Andrew Scheer; June 2, 2011 – December 2, 2015
- Government House leader: Hon. Peter Van Loan; May 18, 2011 – November 4, 2015
- Opposition House leader: Hon. Thomas Mulcair; June 2, 2011 – October 14, 2011
- Joe Comartin; October 14, 2011 – April 19, 2012
- Nathan Cullen; April 20, 2012 – March 19, 2014
- Peter Julian; March 20, 2014 – November 18, 2015
- Members: 308 MP seats List of members

Senate
- Seating arrangements of the Senate
- Speaker of the Senate: Hon. Noël A. Kinsella; February 8, 2006 – November 27, 2014
- Hon. Pierre Claude Nolin; November 27, 2014 – April 23, 2015
- Hon. Leo Housakos; April 24, 2015 - August 2, 2015
- Government Senate leader: Hon. Marjory LeBreton; February 6, 2006 – July 14, 2013
- Claude Carignan; August 30, 2013 – November 4, 2015
- Opposition Senate leader: Hon. Jim Cowan; November 3, 2008 – November 4, 2015
- Senators: 105 senator seats List of senators

Sovereign
- Monarch: HM Elizabeth II; February 6, 1952 – 8 September 2022
- Governor general: HE Rt. Hon. David Johnston; October 1, 2010 – October 2, 2017

Sessions
- 1st session June 2, 2011 – September 13, 2013
- 2nd session October 16, 2013 – August 2, 2015
| ← 40th | → 42nd |

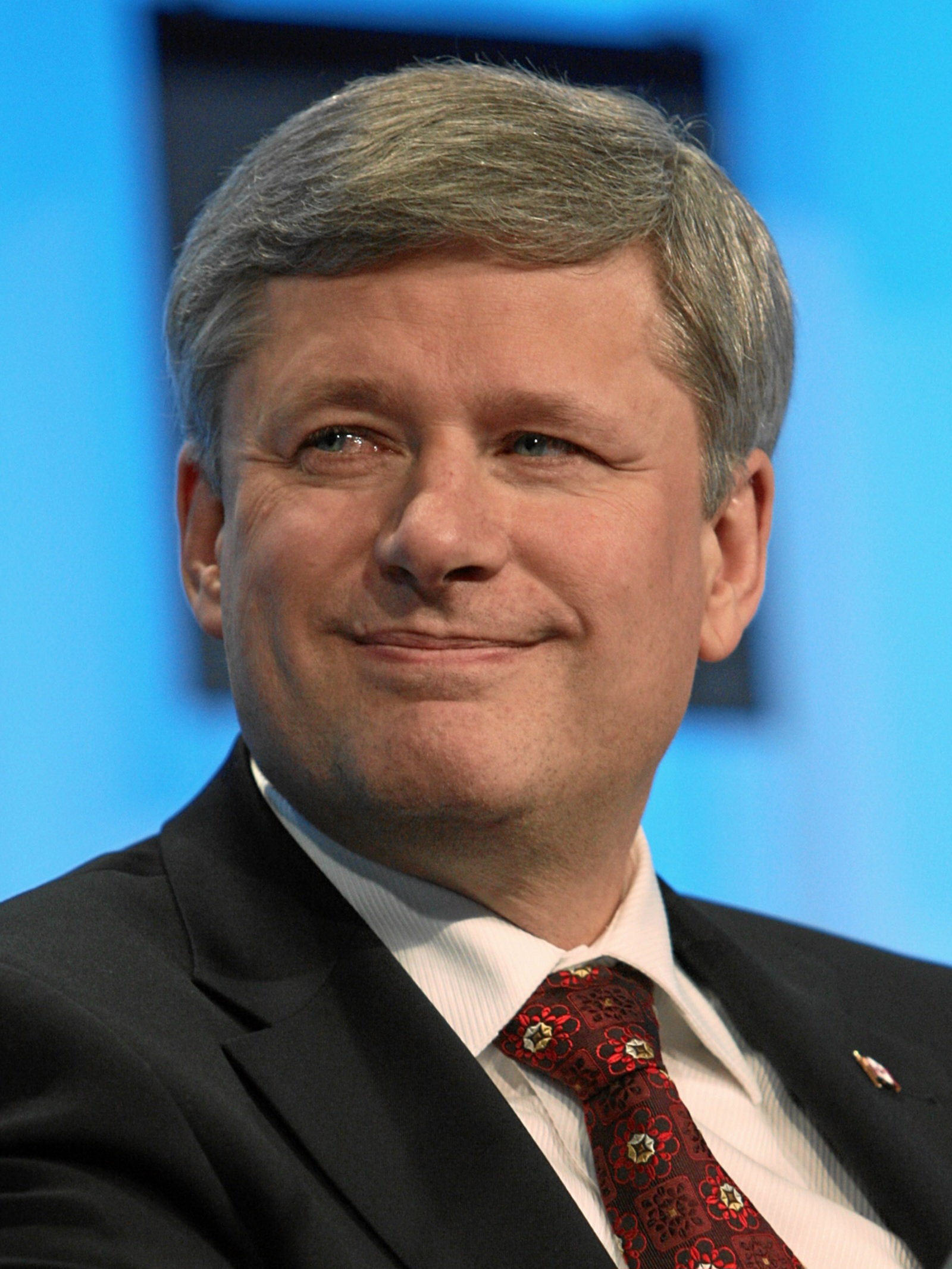
Stephen Harper was Prime Minister during the 41st Canadian Parliament.

The 41st Canadian Parliament was in session from June 2, 2011 to August 2, 2015, with the membership of its House of Commons having been determined by the results of the 2011 federal election held on May 2, 2011. It was dissolved prior to the 2015 federal election.

There were three sessions of the 41st Parliament:

| Session | Start | End |
|---|---|---|
| 1st | June 2, 2011 | September 13, 2013 |
| 2nd | October 16, 2013 | August 2, 2015 |

== Overview ==
Parliament convened on June 2, 2011, with the election of Andrew Scheer as Speaker, followed the next day with the Speech from the Throne.

On August 2, 2015, Prime Minister Stephen Harper asked the Governor General to dissolve Parliament and issue the writ of election, leading to an 11-week election campaign period for the 2015 federal election. Significant legislation adopted during the 41st Parliament included the Copyright Modernization Act, the Safe Streets and Communities Act, the Jobs, Growth and Long-term Prosperity Act, the Jobs and Growth Act and the Fair Elections Act.

== Party standings ==
| Affiliation | House members | | Senate members | |
| Affiliation | 2011 election results | At dissolution | On election day 2011 | At dissolution |
|---|---|---|---|---|
| Conservative | 166 | 159 | 52 | 47 |
| New Democratic | 103 | 95 | 0 | 0 |
| Liberal | 34 | 36 | 46 | 0 |
| Bloc Québécois | 4 | 2 | 0 | 0 |
| Green | 1 | 2 | 0 | 0 |
| Strength in Democracy | —N/a | 2 | —N/a | 0 |
| Independent | 0 | 8 (Note: Scott Andrews, André Bellavance, Sana Hassainia, Maria Mourani, Massimo Pacetti, Manon Perreault, Brent Rathgeber, James Lunney) | 2 | 6 |
| Independent Conservative | 0 | 0 | 0 | 0 |
| Senate PC | 0 | 0 | 2 | 0 |
| Senate Liberal Caucus | —N/a | 0 | —N/a | 29 |
| Independent Progressive Conservative | 0 | 0 | 0 | 1 |
| Total members | 308 | 304 | 103 | 83 |
| Vacant | 0 | 4 | 3 | 22 |
| Total seats | 308 | | 103 | |

== Major events ==
The orange wave during the 2011 election saw a surge in support for the New Democratic Party. This resulted in them becoming the official opposition for the first time in the country's history, as well as marking the Liberal party's first time not taking first or second place in a Canadian election. Jack Layton was the Leader of the Opposition until his death on August 11, 2011. Nycole Turmel followed as the party's interim leader until Tom Mulcair won the 2012 leadership election.

== Legislation and motions ==
=== First session ===
The parliament's first session ran between June 2, 2011, and September 13, 2013, and saw 83 bills adopted. In June 2011, immediately following the election the first six bills were given royal assent. These were the enabling legislation for the 2011 Canadian federal budget, the Canada Post back-to-work legislation titled Restoring Mail Delivery for Canadians Act (Bill C-6), and the Fair and Efficient Criminal Trials Act (Bill C-2) authorizing federal judges to hear all pretrial motions at once during mega-trials.

When the parliament re-convened in September 2011, the Minister of Justice introduced the Safe Streets and Communities Act (Bill C-10), an omnibus bill of nine separate measures. Among the measures include replacing the pardon system with 'record suspensions', mandatory minimum sentences and/or penalties for certain drug and sexual offences, increasing prison sentences for marijuana offences, making it illegal to make sexually explicit information available to a child, reducing the ability of judges to sentence certain offenders to house arrest, allowing immigration officers to deny work permits to foreigners who are at risk of being sexually exploited, and enabling Canadians to sue state sponsors of terrorism for losses due to an act of terrorism. The bill was reviewed by the 'House Standing Committee on Justice and Human Rights' throughout October and November, chaired by Oxford MP Dave MacKenzie and passed by the House of Commons on December 5, 2011, on a 157 to 127 vote, with only the Conservative Party voting in favour. The senate made six amendments and it was given royal assent on March 13, 2012.

On September 29 the Minister of Industry introduced the Copyright Modernization Act (Bill C-11]) — the same bill that was introduced in the 3rd session of the previous parliament and referred to the 'Legislative Committee on Bill C-32'. The bill is first major copyright reform since 1997 and brings Canadian copyright laws in line with modern digital rights management The act enables copyright holders to sue operators of peer-to-peer file sharing sites, makes circumventing technological protection measures (e.g. digital locks, encryption, etc.) illegal except when in the public interest, makes it illegal to remove rights management information (e.g. digital watermarks), extends moral rights for performers, makes legal the practise of copying for the purpose of backup, format shifting (CD to mp3), time shifting (recording to watch later), and expands fair dealing to include use in education, parody, and satire. However, the proposed law was criticized as "irredeemably flawed" due to a contradiction between consumer rights and digital locks, American interference, a requirement for students to destroy copyrighted digital content after a course ends, and makes notice and notice mandatory for all ISPs, including disclosing the identity and activity of customers suspected of copyright infringement. The bill finally passed the House of Commons on June 18 and given royal assent on June 29.

The Minister of Agriculture introduced the Marketing Freedom for Grain Farmers Act (Bill C-18) which repealed the Canadian Wheat Board Act, eliminating the requirement for farmers to sell wheat and barley produce to the Canadian Wheat Board. The new act also appoints a new board of directors that must either privatize or dismantle the wheat board. The bill was studied by the 'Legislative Committee on Bill C-18' chaired by Wetaskiwin MP Blaine Calkins between October 31 and November 4. The bill was subject to a lawsuit by the wheat board's existing board of directors claiming that the government cannot change the mandate of the wheat board without the consent of its members and a counter-suit which sought to prevent the board of directors from using wheat board revenue for legal action against the government. A federal trial court decided that for the bill to be legal the government required the consent of the affected farmers, via a vote or plebiscite, as provided for in the 1998 Canadian Wheat Board Act, although that case is in appeal as of December 2011. Nevertheless, on November 28, the bill was passed by the House of Commons, with only the Conservative Party voting in favour. The bill was reviewed by the Standing Senate Committee on Agriculture and Forestry in December and passed by the Senate on December 15, 2011. Despite the ruling of the judicial branch, Governor General David Johnston gave royal assent to the bill on the same day.

The Minister of Public Safety introduced the Ending the Long-gun Registry Act (Bill C-19) which amends the Criminal Code and the Firearms Act to remove the requirement to register firearms that are neither prohibited nor restricted and requires that the existing records relating to non-restricted firearms in the Canadian Firearms Registry be destroyed. The registration of long guns had been a divisive issue since its inception in 1995. The bill was introduced on October 25 and reviewed by the 'House Standing Committee on Public Safety and National Security' throughout November, chaired by Crowfoot MP Kevin Sorenson. With no amendments made to the bill in committee, it was passed on February 15 by the House of Commons on a 159 to 130 vote, with only two opposition MPs voting in favour. The bill was passed by the senate on April 5, 2012, and given royal assent the next day.

The Minister of Public Safety also introduced the Protecting Children from Internet Predators Act (Bill C-30) which proposed to amend the Criminal Code to grant law enforcement agencies new powers, such as online surveillance or warrantless wiretapping, to combat criminal activity on the internet. The bill has met with criticism from privacy groups, opposition MPs and the public over charges that the law would infringe on the privacy rights of Canadian citizens. Toews responded to the opposition by stating, addressing a Liberal MP, "He can either stand with us or stand with the child pornographers" which was received negatively. The bill was introduced on February 14, 2012, and declared dead a year later when the Response to the Supreme Court of Canada Decision in R. v. Tse Act (Bill C-55) was introduced which also makes provisions for online surveillance and warrantless wiretapping.

Senate leader Majorly LeBreton introduced the Safe Food for Canadians Act (Bill S-11) which was part of a response to tainted meat being discovered coming from the XL Foods processing plant in September 2012. The act made numerous changes to the food regulatory system, including requiring better tracking of products, providing food inspectors more authority and increasing penalties for violations.

The Minister of Justice introduced the Not Criminally Responsible Reform Act (Bill C-54) on February 8, 2013. The legislation proposes to create a "high risk" designation for people found guilty of a crime but not criminally responsible due to a mental disorder and enshrines in law that the safety of the public is paramount in deciding whether and how such a person can re-enter society.

=== Omnibus bills ===
On April 26, 2012, the Minister of Finance introduced the Jobs, Growth and Long-term Prosperity Act (Bill C-38), an omnibus bill that amends over 50 laws. The bill makes numerous amendments to the environmental assessment process, including increasing the threshold for which reviews are required, limiting the scope of the reviews, shortening review times, moving environmental reviews of pipeline projects to the National Energy Board and nuclear projects to the Canadian Nuclear Safety Commission, enabling the delegation of reviews to provincial agencies, limiting reviews of fish habitats to only the fish used for commercial, recreation or first nations purposes, making reviews of migratory birds optional (at the discretion of cabinet), and limits public participation to only those individuals who directly impacted by a proposal or are specifically sought by the review agency for their specialized knowledge. The omnibus bill would also repeal the Kyoto Protocol Implementation Act and the Fair Wages and Hours of Labour Act, eliminates the National Council of Welfare, and the International Centre for Human Rights and Democratic Development, the regulatory agency Assisted Human Reproduction Canada, the Public Appointments Commission, the National Roundtable on the Environment and the Economy, and the Canadian Artists and Producers Professional Relations Tribunal, as well as eliminates the office of the inspector general at the Canadian Security Intelligence Service and certain reviews by Auditor General. It creates a new department called Shared Services Canada and replaces the Employment Insurance Board of Referees with the Social Security Tribunal. The bill also provides for moving the Old Age Security pension threshold from 65 to 67 years old, and provides for the deprecation of the penny and social insurance number cards. The government was criticized for limiting debate on the 420-page bill to only seven days. The bill was passed by the House of Commons on June 18 and the Senate on June 29 and given royal assent on the same day.

The second omnibus bill was the Jobs and Growth Act (Bill C-45), introduced on October 18, 2012, by the Minister of Finance and adopted on December 14. The 443-page bill makes 65 amendments to 24 laws. Among the financial measures in the bill were the elimination of the Overseas Employment Tax Credit and corporate tax credits for mining exploration and development; moving the Atlantic Investment Tax Credit away from oil, gas, and mining towards electricity generation; making provisions for Pooled Registered Pension Plans; various amendments to Registered Disability Savings Plans, Retirement Compensation Arrangements, Employees Profit Sharing Plans, and thin capitalisation rules; reducing the Scientific Research and Experimental Development Tax Credit Program; adding a requirement that employers report as part of an employee's income any contributions to a group sickness or accident insurance plan; increasing the salaries of federal judges and making the income of the Governor General subject to income taxes. Non-financial measures added into the bill included a renaming of the Navigable Waters Protection Act to Navigation Protection Act and reduces its scope from all navigable waters to only 159 rivers and lakes, plus three oceans; creates the Bridge to Strengthen Trade Act which exempts a proposed new bridge between Windsor, Ontario and Detroit, Michigan from the Environmental Assessment Act, Fisheries Act, and the new Navigation Protection Act; eliminates the Merchant Seamen Compensation Board, the Hazardous Materials Information Review Commission, and the Canada Employment Insurance Financing Board. The portion of the bill that dealt with political pensions was taken out after first reading and re-introduced as the Pension Reform Act (Bill C-46).

Fifteen private member bills had received royal assent. Six private member bills were adopted in 2012:

- Geoff Regan's Purple Day Act (Bill C-278) designates March 26 as Purple Day
- John Carmichael's National Flag of Canada Act (Bill C-288) encourages the display of flag of Canada on multiple-residence buildings and gated communities
- Joy Smith's An Act to amend the Criminal Code (trafficking in persons) (Bill C-310) enables the prosecution of Canadians who engage in human trafficking while outside Canada
- Dan Albas's An Act to amend the Importation of Intoxicating Liquors Act (interprovincial importation of wine for personal use) (Bill C-311) allows Canadians to import wine for personal use across provincial borders
- Harold Albrecht's Federal Framework for Suicide Prevention Act (Bill C-300) requires the federal government to operate a program for suicide prevention
- Patricia Davidson's An Act to amend the Food and Drugs Act (non-corrective contact lenses) (Bill C-313) makes cosmetic contact lenses subject to the Food and Drugs Act.

In 2013, another nine private member bills were adopted:

- Gord Brown's An Act to amend the Canada National Parks Act (St. Lawrence Islands National Park of Canada) (Bill C-370) changes the name of St. Lawrence Islands National Park to Thousand Islands National Park
- Roxanne James's An Act to amend the Corrections and Conditional Release Act (vexatious complainants) (Bill C-293) allows Commissioner of the Correctional Service to dismiss complaints believed to be frivolous made by offenders
- Larry Miller's Transboundary Waters Protection Act (Bill C-383) limits the bulk removal of water from the Canadian side of transboundary bodies of water
- Merv Tweed's An Act to amend the Canada Post Corporation Act (library materials) (Bill C-383) allows Canada Post to provide reduced postage rates for mailing library materials
- Blake Richards's Preventing Persons from Concealing Their Identity during Riots and Unlawful Assemblies Act (Bill C-309) makes concealing identity (e.g. wearing a mask) during an unlawful assembly a criminal offense punishable by up to 10 years imprisonment
- Dick Harris's An Act to amend the Employment Insurance Act (incarceration) (Bill C-316) removes time spent in prison from qualifying and benefit periods for employment insurance
- Brian Storseth's An Act to amend the Canadian Human Rights Act (protecting freedom) (Bill C-304) repealed section 13 of the Canadian Human Rights Act which had prohibited dissemination of hate speech by telephone or internet
- David Wilks's An Act to amend the Criminal Code (kidnapping of young person) (Bill C-299) creates mandatory sentencing for an offender convicted of kidnapping a person under 16 years old
- Alexandrine Latendresse's Language Skills Act (Bill C-419) requires that holders of certain appointed public offices must be fluent in both English and French.

=== Second session ===
The second session ran between October 16, 2013, and August 2, 2015, and saw 86 bills receive royal assent. The Prohibiting Cluster Munitions Act implemented Canada's commitments made under the Convention on Cluster Munitions. The Canadian Museum of History Act changed the name and purpose of the Canadian Museum of Civilization to the Canadian Museum of History. The Combating Counterfeit Products Act created a new criminal offence for possessing or exporting of counterfeit goods and allows customs officers to detain goods that they suspect infringe copyright or trade-marks. The Red Tape Reduction Act required that a federal government regulation be eliminated for every new regulation created affecting a business. The Minister of Aboriginal Affairs introduced the First Nations Elections Act which created an alternative electoral system, to the system under the Indian Act, that First Nations may opt in to elect chiefs and councils.

The Minister of Justice sponsored seven bills. The Protecting Canadians from Online Crime Act made revenge porn illegal. The Tackling Contraband Tobacco Act created a new criminal offence for selling, distributing or delivering contraband tobacco products. The Not Criminally Responsible Reform Act makes those found guilty of an offense but not criminally responsible be deemed high risk offenders. The Tougher Penalties for Child Predators Act increases mandatory minimum penalties and maximum penalties for sexual offences against children and creates a publicly accessible database of them, as well as requires reporting to police, border guards and officials in destination countries, of international travel. The Victims Bill of Rights Act creates the "Canadian Victims Bill of Rights" and provides for a right to present a victim impact statement, a right to the protection of identity, a right to participate in the criminal justice process and a right to seek restitution. The Justice for Animals in Service Act makes it a criminal offense to kill or injure a law enforcement animal or a military animal while the animal is carrying out its duty. The Protection of Communities and Exploited Persons Act, which makes purchasing sexual services and communicating in public places or online for the purpose of selling sexual services criminal offenses, was adopted in response to a Supreme Court decision that found the existing laws against prostitution in Canada were unconstitutional.

The Minister of Public Safety sponsored four bills. The Protection of Canada from Terrorists Act allows Canadian Security Intelligence Service (CSIS) to act outside Canadian borders, share information with foreign intelligence agencies and guarantee anonymity to informants. The Anti-terrorism Act, 2015 makes promoting terrorism a criminal offense, allows for preventative arrests, allows for easier information sharing, inclusive of confidential data, between federal organizations for the purpose of detecting threats, and providing new powers to CSIS. The Common Sense Firearms Licensing Act simplifies firearms licensing, provides a six-month amnesty for renewing a licence, eases rules on transporting restricted guns, provides the cabinet power to classify guns, and creates new limits to the power of the chief firearms officer. The Drug-Free Prisons Act gives the Parole Board of Canada permission to cancel parole after a positive drug test.

The Minister of Health's Respect for Communities Act requires extensive consultation and letters of approvals to allow supervised injection site like Insite. The Protecting Canadians from Unsafe Drugs Act allows the Minister of Health to require studies regarding the effects of a therapeutic product (except natural health products, require a label changes, and require healthcare institutions to report adverse drug reactions and medical device incidents.

The Minister of Transport introduced the Safeguarding Canada's Seas and Skies Act implemented the International Convention on Liability and Compensation for Damage in Connection with the Carriage of Hazardous and Noxious Substances by Sea, extends civil and criminal immunity to oil spill response operations, and adds new reporting requirements to oil handling facilities. The same minister also introduce the Safe and Accountable Rail Act establishes minimum liability insurance levels for railway companies and creates a new compensation fund financed by shippers for use to cover damages from railway accidents. The Minister of Natural Resources's Energy Safety and Security Act and Pipeline Safety Act increases the no fault liability for companies involved in oil and gas pipelines and offshore oil facilities to $1-billion and unlimited liability if found at fault, as well as implements parts of the Vienna Convention on Civil Liability for Nuclear Damage.

Nineteen private member bills were adopted in the second session.

- Cheryl Gallant's Disability Tax Credit Promoters Restrictions Act (Bill C-462) prevents tax consultants from charging fees to claim the Disability Tax Credit on behalf of someone.
- David Tilson's An Act to amend the Criminal Code (mischief relating to war memorials) (Bill C-217) makes committing mischief in relation to a war memorial or cenotaph a criminal offense.
- Parm Gill's An Act to amend the Criminal Code and the National Defence Act (criminal organization recruitment) (Bill C-394) makes recruiting, soliciting, encouraging, coercing or inviting a person to join a criminal organization a criminal offense.
- Mark Warawa's An Act to amend the Criminal Code and the Corrections and Conditional Release Act (restrictions on offenders) (Bill C-489) allows courts to require offender to stay 2 kilometres from a victim's residence as a condition of probation and from communicating with the victim or a witness.
- Earl Dreeshen's An Act to amend the Criminal Code (personating peace officer or public officer) (Bill C-444) makes personating a police officer or a public officer while committing a crime be deemed an aggravation
- Rick Norlock's National Hunting, Trapping and Fishing Heritage Day Act (Bill C-501) makes the third Saturday in September National Hunting, Trapping and Fishing Heritage Day.
- Dave MacKenzie's An Act to amend the Corrections and Conditional Release Act (escorted temporary absence) (Bill C-483) transfers the authority, from Correctional Service of Canada to the Parole Board of Canada, to grant or cancel escorted temporary absences of prisoners convicted of first- or second-degree murder.

== Parliamentarians ==
=== Senate ===
In total during the 41st Parliament, Prime-Minister Harper appointed 21 senators, all of whom caucused with the Conservative Party. On May 18, 2011, two weeks after the election, Harper appointed Fabian Manning, Larry Smith, and Josée Verner, all of whom were defeated Conservative Party candidates in the general election. Manning and Smith had resigned from the Senate to run in the election and they became the first Senators to be reappointed to the Senate since John Carling in April 1896. On January 6, 2012, Harper appointed seven new Senators, all Conservative Party members: Alberta Senator-in-waiting Betty Unger, former police chief in the city of Ottawa Vernon White, former MP Norman Doyle, the 2011 Conservative Party nominee in Saint-Hyacinthe—Bagot Jean-Guy Dagenais, as well as JoAnne Buth, Ghislain Maltais, and Asha Seth. A third batch of senators were appointed on September 6, 2012. They included the first Vietnamese-Canadian, Thanh Hai Ngo, and the first Filipino-Canadian, Tobias C. Enverga, to be appointed as senators, as well as Diane Bellemare of Montreal, Tom McInnis of Halifax, and Paul McIntyre. In early 2013, Harper appointed a final batch, including Denise Batters, David Wells of St. John's, Victor Oh of Mississauga, Lynn Beyak of Dryden, Ontario, plus Alberta Senators-in-waiting Doug Black and Scott Tannas.

Of those who left the Senate during the 41st Parliament, 22 had reached the mandatory retirement age, including 12 Conservative Party members and one of the two remaining Progressive Conservatives. Three senators (Fred Dickson, Doug Finley, and Pierre Claude Nolin) died while in office. Of the remaining, 13 voluntarily resigned for various reasons, including 7 who had caucused with the Liberal Party and 6 with the Conservative Party. The Senate suspended three members (Mike Duffy, Pamela Wallin and Patrick Brazeau) for the remainder of the 41st Parliament after allegations of misuse of expense accounts was presented — evidence of misspending was also presented against Mac Harb but he voluntarily resigned before Senate could consider disciplinary measures. A comprehensive audit of all senator expenses was released in June 2015 which identified 21 senators who claimed and were paid for invalid expenses, amounting to $978,627. In addition to Duffy, Wallin, Brazeau and Harb, the audit recommended criminal investigations be conducted into the expense claims of 9 other senators who had served during the 41st Parliament.

In January 2014, the Liberal Party removed its senate members from its national party caucus. From then on, the members and the new senate caucus were referred to as "Independent Liberal" and referred to themselves as the "Senate Liberal Caucus", though they were no longer formally affiliated with the Liberal Party of Canada.

== Committees ==
=== House ===
- Standing Committee on Aboriginal Affairs and Northern Development
- Standing Committee on Access to Information, Privacy and Ethics
- Standing Committee on Agriculture and Agri-Food
- Standing Committee on Canadian Heritage
- Standing Committee on Citizenship and Immigration
- Standing Committee on Environment and Sustainable Development
- Standing Committee on Finance
- Standing Committee on Fisheries and Oceans
- Standing Committee on Foreign Affairs and International Development
- Standing Committee on Government Operations and Estimates
- Standing Committee on Health
- Standing Committee on Human Resources, Skills and Social Development and the Status of Persons with Disabilities
- Standing Committee on Industry, Science and Technology
- Standing Committee on International Trade
- Standing Committee on Justice and Human Rights
- Standing Committee on National Defence
- Standing Committee on Natural Resources
- Standing Committee on Official Languages
- Standing Committee on Procedure and House Affairs
- Standing Committee on Public Accounts
- Standing Committee on Public Safety and National Security
- Standing Committee on Status of Women
- Standing Committee on Transport, Infrastructure and Communities
- Standing Committee on Veterans Affairs

=== Senate ===
- Standing Committee on Aboriginal Peoples
- Standing Committee on Agriculture and Forestry
- Standing Committee on Banking, Trade and Commerce
- Standing Committee on Conflict of Interest for Senators
- Standing Committee on Energy, the Environment and Natural Resources
- Standing Committee on Fisheries and Oceans
- Standing Committee on Foreign Affairs and International Trade
- Standing Committee on Human Rights
- Standing Committee on Internal Economy, Budgets and Administration
- Standing Committee on Legal and Constitutional Affairs
- Standing Committee on National Finance
- Standing Committee on National Security and Defence
  - Subcommittee on Veterans Affairs
- Standing Committee on Official Languages
- Standing Committee on Rules, Procedures and the Rights of Parliament
- Selection Committee
- Standing Committee on Social Affairs, Science and Technology
- Standing Committee on Transport and Communications

=== Joint committees ===
- Standing Joint Committee on the Library of Parliament
- Standing Joint Committee on Scrutiny of Regulations

== Ministry ==
With the 28th Canadian Ministry continuing, Harper largely kept the same cabinet as before the election with Jim Flaherty as Minister of Finance, Peter MacKay as Minister of National Defence, Vic Toews as Minister of Public Safety, Leona Aglukkaq as Minister of Health, and Gerry Ritz as the Minister of Agriculture. Five ministers were lost in the election to retirement or defeat. In the 18 May cabinet shuffle Harper promoted Steven Blaney, Ed Fast, Joe Oliver, Peter Penashue to ministerial positions, as well as promoting Denis Lebel and Julian Fantino from Minister of State roles to ministerial positions. He also promoted Bernard Valcourt, Tim Uppal, Alice Wong, Bal Gosal, and Maxime Bernier to Minister of State roles, replacing the two who had been promoted to Minister, one who had been defeated in the election, and Rob Merrifield and Rob Moore who were demoted. Upon the retirement of Bev Oda in July 2012, Harper promoted Julian Fantino to replace her as Minister for International Cooperation, with Bernard Valcourt replacing Fantino as Associate Minister.

In preparing for the second session, Harper shuffled his cabinet in July 2013. Kellie Leitch, Chris Alexander, Shelly Glover and Kerry-Lynne Findlay were promoted to ministerial positions. Vic Toews, Keith Ashfield, Peter Kent and Gordon O'Connor were removed from cabinet. Michelle Rempel, Pierre Poilievre, Greg Rickford, Candice Bergen and Rob Moore were promoted from Parliamentary Secretaries to Ministers of State. Kevin Sorenson was added to cabinet as a Minister of State. John Duncan resigned as Minister of Aboriginal Affairs and Northern Development a couple months previously but was added back into cabinet as a Minister of State. In the shuffle Leona Aglukkaq became the new Minister of Environment, Rona Ambrose the new Minister of Health, Rob Nicholson the new Minister of National Defence, Gail Shea the new Minister of Fisheries and Oceans, and Peter MacKay the new Minister of Justice and Attorney-General.

== Officeholders ==
The current and former officers of Parliament during the 41st Parliament are set out below.

=== Speakers ===
- Speaker of the Senate of Canada:
  - Hon. Noël Kinsella, Conservative Senator for New Brunswick. (until November 26, 2014)
  - Hon. Pierre Claude Nolin, Conservative Senator for Quebec. (until April 23, 2015)
  - Hon. Leo Housakos, Conservative Senator for Quebec. (until December 3, 2015)
- Speaker of the House of Commons of Canada: Hon. Andrew Scheer, Conservative member for Regina—Qu'Appelle, Saskatchewan

=== Other chair occupants ===
Senate

- Speaker pro tempore of the Canadian Senate:
  - Hon. Donald H. Oliver, Conservative senator for Nova Scotia (until November 16, 2013)
  - Hon. Pierre Claude Nolin, Conservative senator for Salaberry, Quebec (November 20, 2013 – November 27, 2014)
  - Hon. Leo Housakos, Conservative senator for Wellington, Quebec (from November 27, 2014)

House of Commons

- House of Commons Deputy Speaker and Chair of Committees of the Whole:
  - Denise Savoie, NDP member for Victoria, British Columbia (June 6, 2011 – August 31, 2012)
  - Joe Comartin, NDP member for Windsor—Tecumseh, Ontario (from September 17, 2012)
- Deputy Chair of Committees of the Whole: Barry Devolin, Conservative member for Haliburton—Kawartha Lakes—Brock, Ontario
- Assistant Deputy Chair of Committees of the Whole: Bruce Stanton, Conservative member for Simcoe North, Ontario

=== Leaders ===
- Prime Minister of Canada: Rt. Hon. Stephen Harper (Conservative)
- Leader of Her Majesty's Loyal Opposition (NDP):
  - Hon. Jack Layton (May 2, 2011 – August 22, 2011)
  - Nycole Turmel (August 23, 2011 – March 23, 2012 as Opposition Leader; July 28, 2011 to March 24, 2012 as interim NDP leader)
  - Hon. Thomas Mulcair (from March 24, 2012)
- Liberal Party of Canada:
  - Hon. Bob Rae (interim, May 25, 2011 – April 14, 2013)
  - Justin Trudeau (from April 14, 2013 – March 9, 2025)
- Bloc Québécois leader (all acting from outside the House):
  - Vivian Barbot (May 2, 2011 – December 11, 2011)
  - Daniel Paillé (December 11, 2011 – December 16, 2013)
  - Mario Beaulieu (June 14, 2014 – July 1, 2015)
  - Gilles Duceppe (June 10, 2015 – October 22, 2015)
- Green Party of Canada leader: Elizabeth May
- Strength in Democracy leader: Jean-François Fortin (from October 21, 2014)

=== Floor leaders ===
Senate

- Leader of the Government in the Senate:
  - Hon. Marjory LeBreton (until July 14, 2013)
  - Hon. Claude Carignan (from August 20, 2013)
- Leader of the Opposition in the Senate: Hon. Jim Cowan

House of Commons

- Government House Leader: Hon. Peter Van Loan
- Opposition House Leader:
  - Thomas Mulcair (May 26, 2011 – October 12, 2011)
  - Joe Comartin (October 13, 2011 – April 18, 2012)
  - Nathan Cullen (April 19, 2012 – March 19, 2014)
  - Peter Julian (March 20, 2014 – present)
- Liberal House Leader:
  - Marc Garneau (May 26, 2011 – November 27, 2012)
  - Dominic LeBlanc (from November 28, 2012)
- Bloc Québécois House Leader:
  - Louis Plamondon (May 2, 2011 – 2013) (acting)
  - André Bellavance (December 16, 2013 – February 25, 2014) (acting)
  - Jean-François Fortin (February 26, 2014 – August 12, 2014) (acting)
  - Louis Plamondon (August 26, 2014 – present) (acting)

=== Whips ===
Senate

- Government Whip in the Senate: Hon. Elizabeth Marshall
- Deputy Government Whip in the Senate:
  - Hon. Yonah Martin (until September 30, 2013)
  - Hon. Stephen Greene (from October 1, 2013)
- Opposition Whip in the Senate: Hon. Jim Munson
- Deputy Opposition Whip in the Senate: Hon. Libbe Hubley

House of Commons

- Chief Government Whip:
  - Gordon O'Connor (until July 15, 2013)
  - John Duncan (from July 15, 2013)
- Deputy Government Whip:
  - Harold Albrecht (until January 27, 2013)
  - Dave MacKenzie (from January 28, 2013)
- Official Opposition Whip:
  - Chris Charlton (May 26, 2011 – April 18, 2012)
  - Nycole Turmel (from April 19, 2012)
- Liberal Whip: Judy Foote

=== Shadow cabinets ===
- Official Opposition Shadow Cabinet of the 41st Parliament of Canada
- Liberal Shadow Cabinet of the 41st Parliament of Canada
- Bloc Québécois Shadow Cabinet of the 41st Parliament of Canada

== Changes to party standings ==
The following by-elections have been held during the 41st Canadian Parliament:

| By-election | Date | Incumbent | Party | Winner | Party | Cause | Retained |
|---|---|---|---|---|---|---|---|
| Yellowhead | November 17, 2014 | Rob Merrifield | Conservative | Jim Eglinski | Conservative | Resigned to accept appointment as Alberta's envoy to the United States. | Yes |
| Whitby—Oshawa | November 17, 2014 | Jim Flaherty | Conservative | Pat Perkins | Conservative | Death (heart attack) | Yes |
| Scarborough— Agincourt | June 30, 2014 | Jim Karygiannis | Liberal | Arnold Chan | Liberal | Resigned to run for Toronto City Council. | Yes |
| Trinity—Spadina | June 30, 2014 | Olivia Chow | New Democratic | Adam Vaughan | Liberal | Resigned to run for Mayor of Toronto. | No |
| Fort McMurray— Athabasca | June 30, 2014 | Brian Jean | Conservative | David Yurdiga | Conservative | Resigned to return to private life. | Yes |
| Macleod | June 30, 2014 | Ted Menzies | Conservative | John Barlow | Conservative | Resigned to accept a position in the private sector. | Yes |
| Brandon—Souris | November 25, 2013 | Merv Tweed | Conservative | Larry Maguire | Conservative | Resigned to join private sector. | Yes |
| Toronto Centre | November 25, 2013 | Bob Rae | Liberal | Chrystia Freeland | Liberal | Resigned to become First Nations negotiator in Ontario. | Yes |
| Provencher | November 25, 2013 | Vic Toews | Conservative | Ted Falk | Conservative | Resigned to spend more time with his family and join the private sector. | Yes |
| Bourassa | November 25, 2013 | Denis Coderre | Liberal | Emmanuel Dubourg | Liberal | Resigned to run for Mayor of Montreal. | Yes |
| Labrador | May 13, 2013 | Peter Penashue | Conservative | Yvonne Jones | Liberal | Resigned to run again in a by-election following election spending concerns. | No |
| Victoria | November 26, 2012 | Denise Savoie | New Democratic | Murray Rankin | New Democratic | Resignation due to illness | Yes |
| Durham | November 26, 2012 | Bev Oda | Conservative | Erin O'Toole | Conservative | Resignation | Yes |
| Calgary Centre | November 26, 2012 | Lee Richardson | Conservative | Joan Crockatt | Conservative | Resigned to work in the office of the Premier of Alberta. | Yes |
| Toronto—Danforth | March 19, 2012 | Jack Layton | New Democratic | Craig Scott | New Democratic | Death (cancer) | Yes |

The party standings in the House of Commons have changed as follows:

May 2, 2011 – January 17, 2014
| Number of members per party by date | 2011 | | | 2012 | | | | | | | 2013 | | | | | | | | | | | | | |
| Number of members per party by date | May 2 | Aug 22 | Dec 5 | Jan 10 | Mar 19 | Apr 23 | May 30 | Jul 31 | Aug 31 | Nov 26 | Feb 27 | Mar 14 | May 13 | Jun 2 | Jun 5 | Jun 6 | Jul 9 | Jul 31 | Aug 31 | Sep 12 | Sep 26 | Nov 6 | Nov 25 | Dec 13 |
|---|---|---|---|---|---|---|---|---|---|---|---|---|---|---|---|---|---|---|---|---|---|---|---|---|
| Conservative | 166 | | 165 | | | | 164 | 163 | | 165 | | 164 | | | 163 | 164 | 163 | | 162 | | 161 | 160 | 162 | |
| New Democratic | 103 | 102 | | 101 | 102 | 101 | | | 100 | 101 | 100 | | | | | | | | | | | | | |
| Liberal | 34 | | | 35 | | | | | | | | | 36 | 35 | | | | 34 | | | | | 36 | |
| Bloc Québécois | 4 | | | | | | | | | | 5 | | | | | | | | | 4 | | | | |
| Green | 1 | | | | | | | | | | | | | | | | | | | | | | | 2 |
| Independent | 0 | | | | | 1 | | | | | | | | | 2 | | | | | 3 | | | | 2 |
| Independent Conservative | 0 | | 1 | | | | | | | | | | | | | 0 | | | | | 1 | | | |
| Total members | 308 | 307 | | | 308 | | 307 | 306 | 305 | 308 | | 307 | 308 | 307 | | | 306 | 305 | 304 | | | 303 | 307 | |
| Vacant | 0 | 1 | | | 0 | | 1 | 2 | 3 | 0 | | 1 | 0 | 1 | | | 2 | 3 | 4 | | | 5 | 1 | |
| Government majority | 24 | 25 | 23 | | 22 | | 21 | 20 | 21 | 22 | | 21 | 20 | 21 | 19 | 21 | 20 | 21 | 20 | | 18 | 17 | | |

January 17, 2014 – present
| Number of members per party by date | 2014 | | | | | | | | | | | | | 2015 | | | | |
| Number of members per party by date | Jan 17 | Mar 12 | Apr 1 | Apr 10 | Jun 6 | Jun 30 | Aug 12 | Aug 20 | Aug 25 | Sep 17 | Oct 21 | Nov 5 | Nov 17 | Jan 5 | Feb 9 | Mar 16 | Mar 31 | May 13 |
|---|---|---|---|---|---|---|---|---|---|---|---|---|---|---|---|---|---|---|
| Conservative | 161 | | | 160 | | 162 | | | | 161 | | | 163 | | 162 | 161 | 160 | 159 |
| New Democratic | 100 | 99 | | | 98 | | | 97 | | | 96 | | | 95 | | | | |
| Liberal | 36 | | 35 | | | 37 | | | | | | 35 | | | 36 | | | |
| Bloc Québécois | 4 | | | | | | 3 | | 2 | | | | | | | | | |
| Green | 2 | | | | | | | | | | | | | | | | | |
| Strength in Democracy | 0 | | | | | | | | | | 2 | | | | | | | |
| Independent | 2 | | | | 3 | | 4 | 5 | 6 | | 5 | 7 | | | | | 8 | |
| Independent Conservative | 1 | | | | | | | | | | | 0 | | | | | | |
| Total members | 306 | 305 | 304 | 303 | | 307 | | | | 306 | | 305 | 307 | 306 | | 305 | | 304 |
| Vacant | 2 | 3 | 4 | 5 | | 1 | | | | 2 | | 3 | 1 | 2 | | 3 | | 4 |
| Government majority | 16 | 17 | 18 | 17 | | | | | | 16 | | 17 | 19 | 20 | 18 | 17 | 15 | 14 |

The party standings in the Senate have changed during the 41st Canadian Parliament as follows:

May 2, 2011 – May 9, 2013
| Number of members per party by date | 2011 | | | | | | | | | | 2012 | | | | | | | | | | | | | 2013 | | | | | | | |
| Number of members per party by date | May 2 | May 13 | May 25 | Jun 13 | Sep 7 | Sep 21 | Sep 26 | Oct 17 | Dec 2 | Dec 17 | Jan 6 | Jan 17 | Feb 6 | Feb 9 | Feb 20 | Jun 18 | Jun 30 | Jul 21 | Sep 6 | Sep 17 | Sep 23 | Oct 19 | Nov 6 | Jan 10 | Jan 18 | Jan 25 | Feb 7 | Feb 11 | Mar 16 | Mar 22 | Mar 25 |
|---|---|---|---|---|---|---|---|---|---|---|---|---|---|---|---|---|---|---|---|---|---|---|---|---|---|---|---|---|---|---|---|
| Conservative | 52 | | 54 | 55 | | 54 | | | | | 59 | 60 | 59 | 58 | 59 | | 58 | 57 | 62 | | 61 | | 60 | | | 65 | 64 | | 63 | 62 | 63 |
| Liberal | 46 | 45 | | | 44 | | | 43 | 42 | 41 | | | | | | 40 | | | | 39 | | 38 | | 37 | 36 | | | | | | |
| Independent | 2 | | | | | | | | | | | | | | | | | | | | | | | | | | 3 | | | | |
| Senate Progressive Conservative Caucus | 2 | | | | | | 1 | | | | | | | | | | | | | | | | | | | | | 0 | | | |
| Independent Progressive Conservative | 0 | | | | | | | | | | | | | | | | | | | | | | | | | | | 1 | | | |
| Total members | 102 | 101 | 103 | 104 | 103 | 102 | 101 | 100 | 99 | 98 | 103 | 104 | 103 | 102 | 103 | 102 | 101 | 100 | 105 | 104 | 103 | 102 | 101 | 100 | 99 | 104 | | | 103 | 102 | 103 |
| Vacant | 3 | 4 | 2 | 1 | 2 | 3 | 4 | 5 | 6 | 7 | 2 | 1 | 2 | 3 | 2 | 3 | 4 | 5 | 0 | 1 | 2 | 3 | 4 | 5 | 6 | 1 | | | 2 | 3 | 2 |
| Government majority | 2 | 3 | 5 | 6 | 7 | 6 | 7 | 8 | 9 | 10 | 15 | 16 | 15 | 14 | 15 | 16 | 15 | 14 | 19 | 20 | 19 | 20 | 19 | 20 | 21 | 26 | 24 | | 23 | 22 | 23 |

May 9, 2013 – present
| Number of members per party by date | 2013 | | | | | | | | | 2014 | | | | | | | | | | 2015 | | | | | | |
| Number of members per party by date | May 9 | May 11 | May 16 | May 17 | Aug 2 | Aug 26 | Nov 16 | Nov 21 | Nov 30 | Jan 29 | Jun 15 | Jun 17 | Jun 30 | Jul 17 | Jul 25 | Aug 10 | Nov 27 | Dec 2 | Dec 15 | Jan 31 | Apr 17 | Apr 23 | Jun 15 | Jun 17 | Jun 20 | Jul 4 |
|---|---|---|---|---|---|---|---|---|---|---|---|---|---|---|---|---|---|---|---|---|---|---|---|---|---|---|
| Conservative | 63 | 62 | 61 | 60 | | | 59 | | 57 | | 56 | | | 55 | | 54 | 53 | | 52 | | | 51 | 50 | 49 | 48 | 47 |
| Liberal | 35 | | | | 33 | | | 32 | | 0 | | | | | | | | | | | | | | | | |
| Senate Liberal Caucus | 0 | | | | | | | | | 32 | | 31 | 32 | | 31 | | | 30 | | | 29 | | | | | |
| Independent | 4 | | 5 | 6 | | 5 | | 6 | | | | | 5 | | | | | | | 4 | | | 5 | 6 | | |
| Independent Progressive Conservative | 1 | | | | | | | | | | | | | | | | | | | | | | | | | |
| Total members | 103 | 102 | | | 100 | 99 | 98 | | 96 | | 95 | 94 | | 93 | 92 | 91 | 90 | 89 | 88 | 87 | 86 | 85 | | | 84 | 83 |
| Vacant | 2 | 3 | | | 5 | 6 | 7 | | 9 | | 10 | 11 | | 12 | 13 | 14 | 15 | 16 | 17 | 18 | 19 | 20 | | | 21 | 22 |
| Government majority | 23 | 22 | 20 | 18 | 20 | 21 | 20 | | 18 | | 17 | 18 | | 17 | 18 | 17 | 16 | 17 | 16 | 17 | 18 | 16 | 15 | 13 | 12 | 11 |
