= List of senators in the 41st Parliament of Canada =

This is a list of members of the Senate of Canada in the 41st Canadian Parliament.

The province of Quebec has 24 Senate divisions which are constitutionally mandated. In all other provinces, a Senate division is strictly an optional designation of the senator's own choosing, and has no real constitutional or legal standing. A senator who does not choose a special senate division is designated a senator for the province at large.

Names in bold indicate senators in the 28th Canadian Ministry.

== List of senators ==
Name	Party	Province (Division)	Date appointed	Appointed by	Left office	Reason	Start	End
Raynell Andreychuk	Conservative	Saskatchewan	March 11, 1993	Mulroney	August 14, 2019	Retirement	Yes	Yes
W. David Angus	Conservative	Quebec (Alma)	June 10, 1993	Mulroney	July 21, 2012	Retirement	Yes	No
Salma Ataullahjan	Conservative	Ontario	July 9, 2010	Harper	Incumbent		Yes	Yes
George Baker	Liberal	Newfoundland and Labrador	March 26, 2002	Chrétien	September 4, 2017	Retirement	Yes	Yes
George Baker	Liberal (Senate caucus)	Newfoundland and Labrador	March 26, 2002	Chrétien	September 4, 2017	Retirement	Yes	Yes
Tommy Banks	Liberal	Alberta (Edmonton)	April 7, 2000	Chrétien	December 17, 2011	Retirement	Yes	No
Denise Batters	Conservative	Saskatchewan	January 25, 2013	Harper	Incumbent		No	Yes
Diane Bellemare	Conservative	Quebec (Alma)	September 6, 2012	Harper	Incumbent		No	Yes
Lynn Beyak	Conservative	Ontario	January 25, 2013	Harper	Incumbent		No	Yes
Doug Black	Conservative	Alberta	January 25, 2013	Harper	Incumbent		No	Yes
Pierre-Hugues Boisvenu	Conservative	Quebec (La Salle)	January 29, 2010	Harper	Incumbent		Yes	Yes
David Braley	Conservative	Ontario	May 20, 2010	Harper	November 30, 2013	Resignation	Yes	No
Patrick Brazeau	Conservative	Quebec (Repentigny)	January 8, 2009	Harper	Incumbent		Yes	Yes
Patrick Brazeau	Independent	Quebec (Repentigny)	January 8, 2009	Harper	Incumbent		Yes	Yes
Bert Brown	Conservative	Alberta	July 10, 2007	Harper	March 22, 2013	Retirement	Yes	No
JoAnne Buth	Conservative	Manitoba	January 6, 2012	Harper	August 10, 2014	Resignation	No	No
Catherine Callbeck	Liberal	Prince Edward Island	September 23, 1997	Chrétien	July 25, 2014	Retirement	Yes	No
Catherine Callbeck	Liberal (Senate caucus)	Prince Edward Island	September 23, 1997	Chrétien	July 25, 2014	Retirement	Yes	No
Larry Campbell	Liberal	British Columbia (Vancouver)	August 2, 2005	Martin	Incumbent		Yes	Yes
Larry Campbell	Liberal (Senate caucus)	British Columbia (Vancouver)	August 2, 2005	Martin	Incumbent		Yes	Yes
Claude Carignan	Conservative	Quebec (Mille Isles)	August 27, 2009	Harper	Incumbent		Yes	Yes
Sharon Carstairs	Liberal	Manitoba	September 15, 1994	Chrétien	October 17, 2011	Resignation	Yes	No
Andrée Champagne	Conservative	Quebec (Grandville)	August 2, 2005	Martin	July 17, 2014	Retirement	Yes	No
Maria Chaput	Liberal	Manitoba	December 12, 2002	Chrétien	March 1, 2016	Resignation	Yes	Yes
Maria Chaput	Liberal (Senate caucus)	Manitoba	December 12, 2002	Chrétien	March 1, 2016	Resignation	Yes	Yes
Marie-P. Charette-Poulin	Liberal	Ontario	September 22, 1995	Chrétien	April 17, 2015	Resignation	Yes	No
Marie-P. Charette-Poulin	Liberal (Senate caucus)	Ontario	September 22, 1995	Chrétien	April 17, 2015	Resignation	Yes	No
Ethel Cochrane	Conservative	Newfoundland and Labrador	November 17, 1986	Mulroney	September 23, 2012	Retirement	Yes	No
Gerald J. Comeau	Conservative	Nova Scotia	August 30, 1990	Mulroney	November 30, 2013	Resignation	Yes	No
Anne Cools	Independent	Ontario (Toronto-Centre-York)	January 13, 1984	Trudeau	August 12, 2018	Retirement	Yes	Yes
Jane Cordy	Liberal	Nova Scotia	June 9, 2000	Chrétien	Incumbent		Yes	Yes
Jane Cordy	Liberal (Senate caucus)	Nova Scotia	June 9, 2000	Chrétien	Incumbent		Yes	Yes
Jim Cowan	Liberal	Nova Scotia (Halifax)	March 24, 2005	Martin	January 22, 2017	Retirement	Yes	Yes
Jim Cowan	Liberal (Senate caucus)	Nova Scotia (Halifax)	March 24, 2005	Martin	January 22, 2017	Retirement	Yes	Yes
Jean-Guy Dagenais	Conservative	Quebec	January 17, 2012	Harper	Incumbent		No	Yes
Roméo Dallaire	Liberal	Quebec (Gulf)	March 24, 2005	Martin	June 17, 2014	Resignation	Yes	No
Roméo Dallaire	Liberal (Senate caucus)	Quebec (Gulf)	March 24, 2005	Martin	June 17, 2014	Resignation	Yes	No
Dennis Dawson	Liberal	Quebec (Lauzon)	August 2, 2005	Martin	Incumbent		Yes	Yes
Dennis Dawson	Liberal (Senate caucus)	Quebec (Lauzon)	August 2, 2005	Martin	Incumbent		Yes	Yes
Joseph A. Day	Liberal	New Brunswick (Saint John-Kennebecasis)	October 4, 2001	Chrétien	Incumbent		Yes	Yes
Joseph A. Day	Liberal (Senate caucus)	New Brunswick (Saint John-Kennebecasis)	October 4, 2001	Chrétien	Incumbent		Yes	Yes
Pierre De Bané	Liberal	Quebec (De la Vallière)	June 29, 1984	Trudeau	August 2, 2013	Retirement	Yes	No
Jacques Demers	Conservative	Quebec (Rigaud)	August 27, 2009	Harper	August 25, 2019	Retirement	Yes	Yes
Fred Dickson	Conservative	Nova Scotia (Halifax)	January 2, 2009	Harper	February 9, 2012	Death	Yes	No
Consiglio Di Nino	Conservative	Ontario	August 30, 1990	Mulroney	June 30, 2012	Resignation	Yes	No
Percy Downe	Liberal	Prince Edward Island (Charlottetown)	June 26, 2003	Chrétien	Incumbent		Yes	Yes
Percy Downe	Liberal (Senate caucus)	Prince Edward Island (Charlottetown)	June 26, 2003	Chrétien	Incumbent		Yes	Yes
Norman Doyle	Conservative	Newfoundland and Labrador	January 6, 2012	Harper	Incumbent		No	Yes
Mike Duffy	Conservative	Prince Edward Island (Cavendish)	January 2, 2009	Harper	Incumbent		Yes	Yes
Mike Duffy	Independent	Prince Edward Island (Cavendish)	January 2, 2009	Harper	Incumbent		Yes	Yes
Lillian Dyck	Liberal	Saskatchewan (North Battleford)	March 24, 2005	Martin	Incumbent		Yes	Yes
Lillian Dyck	Liberal (Senate caucus)	Saskatchewan (North Battleford)	March 24, 2005	Martin	Incumbent		Yes	Yes
Nicole Eaton	Conservative	Ontario (Caledon)	January 2, 2009	Harper	Incumbent		Yes	Yes
Art Eggleton	Liberal	Ontario (Toronto)	March 24, 2005	Martin	September 29, 2018	Retirement	Yes	Yes
Art Eggleton	Liberal (Senate caucus)	Ontario (Toronto)	March 24, 2005	Martin	September 29, 2018	Retirement	Yes	Yes
Tobias C. Enverga	Conservative	Ontario	September 6, 2012	Harper	November 16, 2017	Death	No	Yes
Joyce Fairbairn	Liberal	Alberta (Lethbridge)	June 29, 1984	Trudeau	January 18, 2013	Resignation	Yes	No
Doug Finley	Conservative	Ontario	August 27, 2009	Harper	May 11, 2013	Death	Yes	No
Suzanne Fortin-Duplessis	Conservative	Quebec (Rougemont)	January 14, 2009	Harper	June 20, 2015	Retirement	Yes	No
Francis Fox	Liberal	Quebec (Victoria)	August 29, 2005	Martin	December 2, 2011	Resignation	Yes	No
Joan Fraser	Liberal	Quebec (De Lorimier)	September 17, 1998	Chrétien	February 2, 2018	Resignation	Yes	Yes
Joan Fraser	Liberal (Senate caucus)	Quebec (De Lorimier)	September 17, 1998	Chrétien	February 2, 2018	Resignation	Yes	Yes
Linda Frum	Conservative	Ontario	August 27, 2009	Harper	Incumbent		Yes	Yes
George Furey	Liberal	Newfoundland and Labrador	August 11, 1999	Chrétien	May 12, 2023	Retirement	Yes	Yes
George Furey	Liberal (Senate caucus)	Newfoundland and Labrador	August 11, 1999	Chrétien	May 12, 2023	Retirement	Yes	Yes
Irving Gerstein	Conservative	Ontario (Toronto)	January 2, 2009	Harper	February 10, 2016	Retirement	Yes	Yes
Stephen Greene	Conservative	Nova Scotia (Halifax — The Citadel)	January 2, 2009	Harper	Incumbent		Yes	Yes
Mac Harb	Liberal	Ontario	September 9, 2003	Chrétien	August 26, 2013	Resignation	Yes	No
Mac Harb	Independent	Ontario	September 9, 2003	Chrétien	August 26, 2013	Resignation	Yes	No
Céline Hervieux-Payette	Liberal	Quebec (Bedford)	March 21, 1995	Chrétien	April 22, 2016	Retirement	Yes	Yes
Céline Hervieux-Payette	Liberal (Senate caucus)	Quebec (Bedford)	March 21, 1995	Chrétien	April 22, 2016	Retirement	Yes	Yes
Leo Housakos	Conservative	Quebec (Wellington)	January 8, 2009	Harper	Incumbent		Yes	Yes
Elizabeth Hubley	Liberal	Prince Edward Island	March 8, 2001	Chrétien	September 8, 2017	Retirement	Yes	Yes
Elizabeth Hubley	Liberal (Senate caucus)	Prince Edward Island	March 8, 2001	Chrétien	September 8, 2017	Retirement	Yes	Yes
Mobina Jaffer	Liberal	British Columbia	June 13, 2001	Chrétien	Incumbent		Yes	Yes
Mobina Jaffer	Liberal (Senate caucus)	British Columbia	June 13, 2001	Chrétien	Incumbent		Yes	Yes
Janis Johnson	Conservative	Manitoba (Winnipeg - Interlake)	September 27, 1990	Mulroney	September 27, 2016	Resignation	Yes	Yes
Serge Joyal	Liberal	Québec (Kennebec)	November 26, 1997	Chrétien	Incumbent		Yes	Yes
Serge Joyal	Liberal (Senate caucus)	Québec (Kennebec)	November 26, 1997	Chrétien	Incumbent		Yes	Yes
Colin Kenny	Liberal	Ontario (Rideau)	June 29, 1984	Trudeau	February 2, 2018	Resignation	Yes	Yes
Colin Kenny	Independent	Ontario (Rideau)	June 29, 1984	Trudeau	February 2, 2018	Resignation	Yes	Yes
Colin Kenny	Liberal (Senate caucus)	Ontario (Rideau)	June 29, 1984	Trudeau	February 2, 2018	Resignation	Yes	Yes
Noël Kinsella	Conservative	New Brunswick (Fredericton-York-Sunbury)	September 12, 1990	Mulroney	November 27, 2014	Retirement	Yes	No
Vim Kochhar	Conservative	Ontario	January 29, 2010	Harper	September 21, 2011	Retirement	Yes	No
Daniel Lang	Conservative	Yukon (Whitehorse)	January 2, 2009	Harper	August 15, 2017	Resignation	Yes	Yes
**Marjory LeBreton**	Conservative	Ontario	June 18, 1993	Mulroney	July 4, 2015	Retirement	Yes	No
Rose-Marie Losier-Cool	Liberal	New Brunswick (Tracadie)	March 21, 1995	Chrétien	June 18, 2012	Retirement	Yes	No
Sandra Lovelace Nicholas	Liberal	New Brunswick	September 21, 2005	Martin	Incumbent		Yes	Yes
Sandra Lovelace Nicholas	Liberal (Senate caucus)	New Brunswick	September 21, 2005	Martin	Incumbent		Yes	Yes
Michael L. MacDonald	Conservative	Nova Scotia (Dartmouth)	January 2, 2009	Harper	Incumbent		Yes	Yes
Frank Mahovlich	Liberal	Ontario	June 11, 1998	Chrétien	January 10, 2013	Retirement	Yes	No
Ghislain Maltais	Conservative	Quebec	January 6, 2012	Harper	April 22, 2019	Retirement	No	Yes
Fabian Manning	Conservative	Newfoundland and Labrador	May 25, 2011	Harper	Incumbent		No	Yes
Elizabeth Marshall	Conservative	Newfoundland and Labrador	January 29, 2010	Harper	Incumbent		Yes	Yes
Yonah Martin	Conservative	British Columbia (Vancouver)	January 2, 2009	Harper	Incumbent		Yes	Yes
Paul J. Massicotte	Liberal	Quebec (De Lanaudière)	June 26, 2003	Chrétien	Incumbent		Yes	Yes
Paul J. Massicotte	Liberal (Senate caucus)	Quebec (De Lanaudière)	June 26, 2003	Chrétien	Incumbent		Yes	Yes
Elaine McCoy	Progressive Conservative	Alberta (Calgary)	March 24, 2005	Martin	Incumbent		Yes	Yes
Elaine McCoy	Independent Progressive Conservative	Alberta (Calgary)	March 24, 2005	Martin	Incumbent		Yes	Yes
Tom McInnis	Conservative	Nova Scotia	September 6, 2012	Harper	Incumbent		No	Yes
Paul McIntyre	Conservative	New Brunswick	September 6, 2012	Harper	Incumbent		No	Yes
Michael Meighen	Conservative	Ontario (St. Marys)	September 27, 1990	Mulroney	February 6, 2012	Resignation	Yes	No
Terry Mercer	Liberal	Nova Scotia (Northend Halifax)	November 7, 2003	Chrétien	Incumbent		Yes	Yes
Terry Mercer	Liberal (Senate caucus)	Nova Scotia (Northend Halifax)	November 7, 2003	Chrétien	Incumbent		Yes	Yes
Pana Merchant	Liberal	Saskatchewan	December 12, 2002	Chrétien	March 31, 2017	Resignation	Yes	Yes
Pana Merchant	Liberal (Senate caucus)	Saskatchewan	December 12, 2002	Chrétien	March 31, 2017	Resignation	Yes	Yes
Don Meredith	Conservative	Ontario	December 20, 2010	Harper	May 10, 2017	Resignation	Yes	Yes
Don Meredith	Independent	Ontario	December 20, 2010	Harper	May 10, 2017	Resignation	Yes	Yes
Grant Mitchell	Liberal	Alberta (Edmonton)	March 24, 2005	Martin	Incumbent		Yes	Yes
Grant Mitchell	Liberal (Senate caucus)	Alberta (Edmonton)	March 24, 2005	Martin	Incumbent		Yes	Yes
Percy Mockler	Conservative	New Brunswick (St. Leonard)	January 2, 2009	Harper	Incumbent		Yes	Yes
Wilfred P. Moore	Liberal	Nova Scotia (Stanhope St./Bluenose)	September 26, 1996	Chrétien	January 14, 2017	Retirement	Yes	Yes
Wilfred P. Moore	Liberal (Senate caucus)	Nova Scotia (Stanhope St./Bluenose)	September 26, 1996	Chrétien	January 14, 2017	Retirement	Yes	Yes
Jim Munson	Liberal	Ontario (Ottawa/Rideau Canal)	December 10, 2003	Chrétien	Incumbent		Yes	Yes
Jim Munson	Liberal (Senate caucus)	Ontario (Ottawa/Rideau Canal)	December 10, 2003	Chrétien	Incumbent		Yes	Yes
Lowell Murray	Progressive Conservative	Ontario (Pakenham)	September 13, 1979	Clark	September 26, 2011	Retirement	Yes	No
Nancy Ruth	Conservative	Ontario (Toronto)	March 24, 2005	Martin	January 6, 2017	Retirement	Yes	Yes
Richard Neufeld	Conservative	British Columbia (Charlie Lake)	January 2, 2009	Harper	Incumbent		Yes	Yes
Thanh Hai Ngo	Conservative	Ontario	September 6, 2012	Harper	Incumbent		No	Yes
Pierre Claude Nolin	Conservative	Quebec (De Salaberry)	June 18, 1993	Mulroney	April 23, 2015	Death	Yes	No
Kelvin Ogilvie	Conservative	Nova Scotia (Annapolis Valley - Hants)	August 27, 2009	Harper	November 6, 2017	Retirement	Yes	Yes
Victor Oh	Conservative	Ontario	January 25, 2013	Harper	Incumbent		No	Yes
Donald Oliver	Conservative	Nova Scotia (South Shore)	September 7, 1990	Mulroney	November 16, 2013	Retirement	Yes	No
Dennis Patterson	Conservative	Nunavut	August 27, 2009	Harper	Incumbent		Yes	Yes
Lucie Pépin	Liberal	Quebec (Shawinigan)	April 8, 1997	Chrétien	September 7, 2011	Retirement	Yes	No
Robert Peterson	Liberal	Saskatchewan (Regina)	March 24, 2005	Martin	October 19, 2012	Retirement	Yes	No
Don Plett	Conservative	Manitoba (Landmark)	August 27, 2009	Harper	Incumbent		Yes	Yes
Rose-May Poirier	Conservative	New Brunswick (Saint-Louis-de-Kent)	February 28, 2010	Harper	Incumbent		Yes	Yes
Vivienne Poy	Liberal	Ontario (Toronto)	September 17, 1998	Chrétien	September 17, 2012	Resignation	Yes	No
Nancy Greene Raine	Conservative	British Columbia (Sun Peaks)	January 2, 2009	Harper	May 11, 2018	Retirement	Yes	Yes
Pierrette Ringuette	Liberal	New Brunswick	December 12, 2002	Chrétien	Incumbent		Yes	Yes
Pierrette Ringuette	Liberal (Senate caucus)	New Brunswick	December 12, 2002	Chrétien	Incumbent		Yes	Yes
Michel Rivard	Conservative	Quebec (The Laurentides)	January 2, 2009	Harper	August 7, 2016	Retirement	Yes	Yes
Jean-Claude Rivest	Independent	Quebec (Stadacona)	March 11, 1993	Mulroney	January 31, 2015	Resignation	Yes	No
Fernand Robichaud	Liberal	New Brunswick (Saint Louis de Kent)	September 23, 1997	Chrétien	December 2, 2014	Retirement	Yes	No
Fernand Robichaud	Liberal (Senate caucus)	New Brunswick (Saint Louis de Kent)	September 23, 1997	Chrétien	December 2, 2014	Retirement	Yes	No
Bill Rompkey	Liberal	Newfoundland and Labrador (North West River)	September 22, 1995	Chrétien	May 13, 2011	Retirement	Yes	No
Bob Runciman	Conservative	Ontario	January 29, 2010	Harper	August 10, 2017	Retirement	Yes	Yes
Judith Seidman	Conservative	Québec (De la Durantaye)	August 27, 2009	Harper	Incumbent		Yes	Yes
Hugh Segal	Conservative	Ontario (Kingston)	August 2, 2005	Martin	June 15, 2014	Resignation	Yes	No
Asha Seth	Conservative	Ontario	January 6, 2012	Harper	December 15, 2014	Retirement	No	No
Nick Sibbeston	Liberal	Northwest Territories	September 2, 1999	Chrétien	November 21, 2017	Resignation	Yes	Yes
Nick Sibbeston	Liberal (Senate caucus)	Northwest Territories	September 2, 1999	Chrétien	November 21, 2017	Resignation	Yes	Yes
David P. Smith	Liberal	Ontario (Cobourg)	June 25, 2002	Chrétien	May 16, 2016	Retirement	Yes	Yes
David P. Smith	Liberal (Senate caucus)	Ontario (Cobourg)	June 25, 2002	Chrétien	May 16, 2016	Retirement	Yes	Yes
Larry Smith	Conservative	Quebec (Saurel)	May 25, 2011	Harper	Incumbent		No	Yes
Gerry St. Germain	Conservative	British Columbia (Langley-Pemberton-Whistler)	June 23, 1993	Mulroney	November 6, 2012	Retirement	Yes	No
Carolyn Stewart Olsen	Conservative	New Brunswick	August 27, 2009	Harper	Incumbent		Yes	Yes
Terry Stratton	Conservative	Manitoba (Red River)	March 25, 1993	Mulroney	March 16, 2013	Retirement	Yes	No
Scott Tannas	Conservative	Alberta	March 25, 2013	Harper	Incumbent		No	Yes
Claudette Tardif	Liberal	Alberta (Edmonton)	March 24, 2005	Martin	February 2, 2018	Resignation	Yes	Yes
Claudette Tardif	Liberal (Senate caucus)	Alberta (Edmonton)	March 24, 2005	Martin	February 2, 2018	Resignation	Yes	Yes
David Tkachuk	Conservative	Saskatchewan	June 8, 1993	Mulroney	Incumbent		Yes	Yes
Betty Unger	Conservative	Alberta	January 6, 2012	Harper	August 21, 2018	Retirement	No	Yes
Josée Verner	Conservative	Quebec (Montarville)	June 13, 2011	Harper	Incumbent		No	Yes
John D. Wallace	Conservative	New Brunswick (Rothesay)	January 2, 2009	Harper	February 1, 2017	Resignation	Yes	Yes
Pamela Wallin	Conservative	Saskatchewan (Kuroki Beach)	January 2, 2009	Harper	Incumbent		Yes	Yes
Pamela Wallin	Independent	Saskatchewan (Kuroki Beach)	January 2, 2009	Harper	Incumbent		Yes	Yes
Charlie Watt	Liberal	Quebec (Inkerman)	January 16, 1984	Trudeau	March 16, 2018	Resignation	Yes	Yes
Charlie Watt	Liberal (Senate caucus)	Quebec (Inkerman)	January 16, 1984	Trudeau	March 16, 2018	Resignation	Yes	Yes
David Wells	Conservative	Newfoundland and Labrador	January 25, 2013	Harper	Incumbent		No	Yes
Vernon White	Conservative	Ontario	February 20, 2012	Harper	Incumbent		No	Yes
Rod Zimmer	Liberal	Manitoba (Winnipeg)	August 2, 2005	Martin	August 2, 2013	Resignation	Yes	No

== Resignations, retirements, deaths, and floor crossing ==
=== Left Senate during the 41st Parliament ===
Date	Name	Party	Province (Division)	Details
May 13, 2011	William Rompkey	Liberal	Newfoundland and Labrador	Reached mandatory retirement age of 75
September 7, 2011	Lucie Pépin	Liberal	Quebec (Shawinigan)	Reached mandatory retirement age of 75
September 21, 2011	Vim Kochhar	Conservative	Ontario	Reached mandatory retirement age of 75
September 26, 2011	Lowell Murray	Progressive Conservative	Ontario (Pakenham)	Reached mandatory retirement age of 75
October 17, 2011	Sharon Carstairs	Liberal	Manitoba	Resigned
December 2, 2011	Francis Fox	Liberal	Quebec (Victoria)	Resigned
December 17, 2011	Tommy Banks	Liberal	Alberta (Edmonton)	Reached mandatory retirement age of 75
February 6, 2012	Michael Meighen	Conservative	Ontario	Resigned
February 9, 2012	Fred Dickson	Conservative	Nova Scotia	Death
June 18, 2012	Rose-Marie Losier-Cool	Liberal	New Brunswick (Tracadie)	Reached mandatory retirement age of 75
June 30, 2012	Consiglio Di Nino	Conservative	Ontario	Resigned
July 21, 2012	W. David Angus	Conservative	Quebec (Alma)	Reached mandatory retirement age of 75
September 17, 2012	Vivienne Poy	Liberal	Ontario (Toronto)	Resigned
September 23, 2012	Ethel Cochrane	Conservative	Newfoundland and Labrador	Reached mandatory retirement age of 75
October 19, 2012	Robert Peterson	Liberal	Saskatchewan (Regina)	Reached mandatory retirement age of 75
November 6, 2012	Gerry St. Germain	Conservative	British Columbia (Langley-Pemberton-Whistler)	Reached mandatory retirement age of 75
January 10, 2013	Frank Mahovlich	Liberal	Ontario	Reached mandatory retirement age of 75
January 18, 2013	Joyce Fairbairn	Liberal	Alberta (Lethbridge)	Resigned
March 16, 2013	Terry Stratton	Conservative	Manitoba (Red River)	Reached mandatory retirement age of 75
March 22, 2013	Bert Brown	Conservative	Alberta	Reached mandatory retirement age of 75
May 11, 2013	Doug Finley	Conservative	Ontario	Death
August 2, 2013	Pierre de Bané	Liberal	Quebec	Reached mandatory retirement age of 75
August 2, 2013	Rod Zimmer	Liberal	Manitoba	Resigned due to health issues
August 26, 2013	Mac Harb	Independent	Ontario	Resigned due to expense scandal.
November 16, 2013	Donald Oliver	Conservative	Nova Scotia (South Shore)	Reached mandatory retirement age of 75
November 30, 2013	Gerald J. Comeau	Conservative	Nova Scotia	Resigned
November 30, 2013	David Braley	Conservative	Ontario	Resigned
June 15, 2014	Hugh Segal	Conservative	Ontario	Resigned
June 17, 2014	Romeo Dallaire	Liberal	Quebec (Gulf)	Resigned
July 17, 2014	Andrée Champagne	Conservative	Quebec (Grandville)	Reached mandatory retirement age of 75
July 25, 2014	Catherine Callbeck	Liberal	Prince Edward Island	Reached mandatory retirement age of 75
August 10, 2014	JoAnne Buth	Conservative	Manitoba	Resigned
November 27, 2014	Noël Kinsella	Conservative	New Brunswick (Fredericton-York-Sunbury)	Reached mandatory retirement age of 75
December 2, 2014	Fernand Robichaud	Liberal	New Brunswick (Saint Louis de Kent)	Reached mandatory retirement age of 75
December 15, 2014	Asha Seth	Conservative	Ontario	Reached mandatory retirement age of 75
January 31, 2015	Jean-Claude Rivest	Independent	Quebec (Stadacona)	Resignation
April 17, 2015	Marie-P. Charette-Poulin	Liberal (Senate caucus)	Ontario	Resignation due to illness
April 23, 2015	Pierre Claude Nolin	Conservative	Quebec (De Salaberry)	Death
June 20, 2015	Suzanne Fortin-Duplessis	Conservative	Quebec (Rougemont)	Reached mandatory retirement age of 75
July 4, 2015	Marjory LeBreton	Conservative	Ontario	Reached mandatory retirement age of 75

=== Changes in party affiliation during the 41st Parliament ===
Date	Name	Party (subsequent)	Party (previous)	Details
February 7, 2013	Patrick Brazeau	Independent	Conservative	Conservative whip withdrawn
February 11, 2013	Elaine McCoy	Independent Progressive Conservative	Progressive Conservative	
May 9, 2013	Mac Harb	Independent	Liberal	Resigned Liberal whip
May 16, 2013	Mike Duffy	Independent	Conservative	Resigned Conservative whip
May 17, 2013	Pamela Wallin	Independent	Conservative	Resigned Conservative whip
November 21, 2013	Colin Kenny	Independent	Liberal	Withdrew from Liberal caucus after sexual harassment complaint.
January 29, 2014	All 32 Liberal senators	Liberal (Senate caucus)	Liberal	All Liberal senators are removed from parliament caucus.
June 30, 2014	Colin Kenny	Liberal (Senate caucus)	Independent	Invited back into Liberal caucus.
June 15, 2015	Pierre-Hugues Boisvenu	Independent	Conservative	Resigned from caucus due to RCMP investigation into his expenses.
June 17, 2015	Don Meredith	Independent	Conservative	Conservative whip withdrawn

== Party standings since the election ==
The party standings have changed as follows since the election of the 41st Parliament on May 2, 2011:

May 2, 2011 – May 9, 2013
Number of members per party by date	2011										2012													2013							
Number of members per party by date	May 2	May 13	May 25	Jun 13	Sep 7	Sep 21	Sep 26	Oct 17	Dec 2	Dec 17	Jan 6	Jan 17	Feb 6	Feb 9	Feb 20	Jun 18	Jun 30	Jul 21	Sep 6	Sep 17	Sep 23	Oct 19	Nov 6	Jan 10	Jan 18	Jan 25	Feb 7	Feb 11	Mar 16	Mar 22	Mar 25
Conservative	52		54	55		54					59	60	59	58	59		58	57	62		61		60			65	64		63	62	63
Liberal	46	45			44			43	42	41						40				39		38		37	36						
Independent	2																										3				
Senate Progressive Conservative Caucus	2						1																					0			
Independent Progressive Conservative	0																											1			
Total members	102	101	103	104	103	102	101	100	99	98	103	104	103	102	103	102	101	100	105	104	103	102	101	100	99	104			103	102	103
Vacant	3	4	2	1	2	3	4	5	6	7	2	1	2	3	2	3	4	5	0	1	2	3	4	5	6	1			2	3	2
Government majority	2	3	5	6	7	6	7	8	9	10	15	16	15	14	15	16	15	14	19	20	19	20	19	20	21	26	24		23	22	23

May 9, 2013 – present
Number of members per party by date	2013									2014										2015						
Number of members per party by date	May 9	May 11	May 16	May 17	Aug 2	Aug 26	Nov 16	Nov 21	Nov 30	Jan 29	Jun 15	Jun 17	Jun 30	Jul 17	Jul 25	Aug 10	Nov 27	Dec 2	Dec 15	Jan 31	Apr 17	Apr 23	Jun 15	Jun 17	Jun 20	Jul 4
Conservative	63	62	61	60			59		57		56			55		54	53		52			51	50	49	48	47
Liberal	35				33			32		0																
Senate Liberal Caucus	0									32		31	32		31			30			29					
Independent	4		5	6		5		6					5							4			5	6		
Independent Progressive Conservative	1																									
Total members	103	102			100	99	98		96		95	94		93	92	91	90	89	88	87	86	85			84	83
Vacant	2	3			5	6	7		9		10	11		12	13	14	15	16	17	18	19	20			21	22
Government majority	23	22	20	18	20	21	20		18		17	18		17	18	17	16	17	16	17	18	16	15	13	12	11

== See also ==
- List of House members of the 41st Parliament of Canada
- Women in the 41st Canadian Parliament
- List of current Canadian senators
