= Colin Kenny =

Colin Kenny may refer to:

- Colin Kenny (politician)
- Colin Kenny (actor)
