= List of House members of the 41st Parliament of Canada =

This is a list of members of the House of Commons of Canada in the 41st Canadian Parliament (June 2, 2011 to August 2, 2015).

== Members ==
Key:

- Party leaders are italicized.
- Cabinet ministers are in **boldface**.
- The prime minister is **both**.
- The speaker is indicated by "†".
- Parliamentary secretaries are indicated by "‡".

=== Alberta ===
Name	Party	Electoral district	First elected / previously elected	No. of terms
Lee Richardson (until May 30, 2012)	Conservative	Calgary Centre	1988, (Note: Calgary Southeast) 2004	5th term*
Joan Crockatt (after November 26, 2012)	Conservative	Calgary Centre	2012	1st term
**Michelle Rempel** ‡	Conservative	Calgary Centre-North	2011	1st term
Deepak Obhrai ‡	Conservative	Calgary East	1997	6th term
Devinder Shory	Conservative	Calgary Northeast	2008	2nd term
**Diane Ablonczy**	Conservative	Calgary—Nose Hill	1993	7th term
**Jason Kenney**	Conservative	Calgary Southeast	1997	6th term
**Stephen Harper**	Conservative	Calgary Southwest	1993, (Note: Calgary West) 2002	6th term*
Rob Anders	Conservative	Calgary West	1997	6th term
**Kevin Sorenson**	Conservative	Crowfoot	2000	5th term
Laurie Hawn	Conservative	Edmonton Centre	2006	3rd term
Peter Goldring	Conservative	Edmonton East	1997	6th term
Peter Goldring	Independent Conservative	Edmonton East	1997	6th term
Peter Goldring	Conservative^{a}	Edmonton East	1997	6th term
James Rajotte	Conservative	Edmonton—Leduc	2000	5th term
Mike Lake ‡	Conservative	Edmonton—Mill Woods—Beaumont	2006	3rd term
Linda Duncan	New Democratic	Edmonton—Strathcona	2008	2nd term
Brent Rathgeber	Conservative	Edmonton—St. Albert	2008	2nd term
Brent Rathgeber	Independent^{b}	Edmonton—St. Albert	2008	2nd term
**Tim Uppal**	Conservative	Edmonton—Sherwood Park	2008	2nd term
**Rona Ambrose**	Conservative	Edmonton—Spruce Grove	2004	4th term
Brian Jean (until January 17, 2014)	Conservative	Fort McMurray—Athabasca	2004	4th term
David Yurdiga (after June 30, 2014)	Conservative	Fort McMurray—Athabasca	2014	1st term
Jim Hillyer	Conservative	Lethbridge	2011	1st term
**Ted Menzies** (until November 6, 2013)	Conservative	Macleod	2004	4th term
John Barlow (after June 30, 2014)	Conservative	Macleod	2014	1st term
LaVar Payne	Conservative	Medicine Hat	2008	2nd term
Chris Warkentin ‡	Conservative	Peace River	2006	3rd term
Earl Dreeshen	Conservative	Red Deer	2008	2nd term
Leon Benoit	Conservative	Vegreville—Wainwright	1993	7th term
Brian Storseth	Conservative	Westlock—St. Paul	2006	3rd term
Blaine Calkins	Conservative	Wetaskiwin	2006	3rd term
Blake Richards	Conservative	Wild Rose	2008	2nd term
Rob Merrifield (until September 17, 2014)	Conservative	Yellowhead	2000	5th term
Jim Eglinski (after November 17, 2014)	Conservative	Yellowhead	2014	1st term

- **^a** Voluntarily left caucus on December 5, 2011, and re-joined the Conservative caucus on June 6, 2013
- **^b** Left caucus on June 5, 2013

=== British Columbia ===
Name	Party	Electoral district	First elected / previously elected	No. of terms
**Ed Fast**	Conservative	Abbotsford	2006	3rd term
Alex Atamanenko	New Democratic	British Columbia Southern Interior	2006	3rd term
Kennedy Stewart	New Democratic	Burnaby—Douglas	2011	1st term
Peter Julian	New Democratic	Burnaby—New Westminster	2004	4th term
Richard Harris	Conservative	Cariboo—Prince George	1993	7th term
Mark Strahl ‡	Conservative	Chilliwack—Fraser Canyon	2011	1st term
**Kerry-Lynne Findlay** ‡	Conservative	Delta—Richmond East	2011	1st term
Randall Garrison	New Democratic	Esquimalt—Juan de Fuca	2011	1st term
Nina Grewal	Conservative	Fleetwood—Port Kells	2004	4th term
Cathy McLeod ‡	Conservative	Kamloops—Thompson—Cariboo	2008	2nd term
Ron Cannan	Conservative	Kelowna—Lake Country	2006	3rd term
David Wilks	Conservative	Kootenay—Columbia	2011	1st term
Mark Warawa	Conservative	Langley	2004	4th term
James Lunney	Conservative	Nanaimo—Alberni	2000	5th term
James Lunney	Independent^{c}	Nanaimo—Alberni	2000	5th term
Jean Crowder	New Democratic	Nanaimo—Cowichan	2004	4th term
Fin Donnelly	New Democratic	New Westminster—Coquitlam	2009	2nd term
Jinny Sims	New Democratic	Newton—North Delta	2011	1st term
Andrew Saxton ‡	Conservative	North Vancouver	2008	2nd term
Dan Albas ‡	Conservative	Okanagan—Coquihalla	2011	1st term
Colin Mayes	Conservative	Okanagan—Shuswap	2006	3rd term
Randy Kamp ‡	Conservative	Pitt Meadows—Maple Ridge—Mission	2004	4th term
**James Moore**	Conservative	Port Moody—Westwood—Port Coquitlam	2000	5th term
Bob Zimmer	Conservative	Prince George—Peace River	2011	1st term
**Alice Wong**	Conservative	Richmond	2008	2nd term
Elizabeth May	Green	Saanich—Gulf Islands	2011	1st term
Russ Hiebert	Conservative	South Surrey—White Rock—Cloverdale	2004	4th term
Nathan Cullen	New Democratic	Skeena—Bulkley Valley	2004	4th term
Jasbir Sandhu	New Democratic	Surrey North	2011	1st term
Hedy Fry	Liberal	Vancouver Centre	1993	7th term
Libby Davies	New Democratic	Vancouver East	1997	6th term
**John Duncan**	Conservative	Vancouver Island North	1993, 2008	6th term*
Don Davies	New Democratic	Vancouver Kingsway	2008	2nd term
Joyce Murray	Liberal	Vancouver Quadra	2008	3rd term
Wai Young	Conservative	Vancouver South	2011	1st term
Denise Savoie (until August 23, 2012)	New Democratic	Victoria	2006	3rd term
Murray Rankin (after November 26, 2012)	New Democratic	Victoria	2012	1st term
John Weston	Conservative	West Vancouver—Sunshine Coast—Sea to Sky Country	2008	2nd term

- **^c** Resigned from caucus March 31, 2015.

=== Manitoba ===
Name	Party	Electoral district	First elected / previously elected	No. of terms
Merv Tweed (until August 31, 2013)	Conservative	Brandon—Souris	2004	4th term
Larry Maguire (after November 25, 2013)	Conservative	Brandon—Souris	2013	1st term
**Steven Fletcher**	Conservative	Charleswood—St. James—Assiniboia	2004	4th term
Niki Ashton	New Democratic	Churchill	2008	2nd term
Robert Sopuck	Conservative	Dauphin—Swan River—Marquette	2010	2nd term
Lawrence Toet	Conservative	Elmwood—Transcona	2011	1st term
Joy Smith	Conservative	Kildonan—St. Paul	2004	4th term
**Candice Bergen** ‡	Conservative	Portage—Lisgar	2008	2nd term
**Vic Toews** (until July 9, 2013)	Conservative	Provencher	2000	5th term
Ted Falk (after November 25, 2013)	Conservative	Provencher	2013	1st term
**Shelly Glover** ‡	Conservative	Saint Boniface	2008	2nd term
James Bezan ‡	Conservative	Selkirk—Interlake	2004	4th term
Pat Martin	New Democratic	Winnipeg Centre	1997	6th term
Kevin Lamoureux	Liberal	Winnipeg North	2010	2nd term
Rod Bruinooge	Conservative	Winnipeg South	2006	3rd term
Joyce Bateman	Conservative	Winnipeg South Centre	2011	1st term

=== New Brunswick ===
Name	Party	Electoral district	First elected / previously elected	No. of terms
Yvon Godin	New Democratic	Acadie—Bathurst	1997	6th term
Dominic LeBlanc	Liberal	Beauséjour	2000	5th term
**Keith Ashfield**	Conservative	Fredericton	2008	2nd term
**Rob Moore**	Conservative	Fundy Royal	2004	4th term
**Bernard Valcourt**	Conservative	Madawaska—Restigouche	1984, 2011	3rd term*
Tilly O'Neill-Gordon	Conservative	Miramichi	2008	2nd term
Robert Goguen ‡	Conservative	Moncton—Riverview—Dieppe	2011	1st term
John Williamson	Conservative	New Brunswick Southwest	2011	1st term
Rodney Weston	Conservative	Saint John	2008	2nd term
Mike Allen	Conservative	Tobique—Mactaquac	2006	3rd term

=== Newfoundland and Labrador ===
Name	Party	Electoral district	First elected / previously elected	No. of terms
Scott Andrews	Liberal	Avalon	2008	2nd term
Scott Andrews	Independent^{d}	Avalon	2008	2nd term
Scott Simms	Liberal	Bonavista—Gander—Grand Falls—Windsor	2004	4th term
Gerry Byrne	Liberal	Humber—St. Barbe—Baie Verte	1996	7th term
**Peter Penashue** (until March 14, 2013)	Conservative	Labrador	2011	1st term
Yvonne Jones (after May 13, 2013)	Liberal	Labrador	2013	1st term
Judy Foote	Liberal	Random—Burin—St. George's	2008	2nd term
Jack Harris	New Democratic	St. John's East	1987, 2008	3rd term*
Ryan Cleary	New Democratic	St. John's South—Mount Pearl	2011	1st term

- **^d** Suspended from caucus November 5, 2014.

=== Nova Scotia ===
Name	Party	Electoral district	First elected / previously elected	No. of terms
Rodger Cuzner	Liberal	Cape Breton—Canso	2000	5th term
**Peter MacKay**	Conservative	Central Nova	1997	6th term
Scott Armstrong ‡	Conservative	Cumberland—Colchester—Musquodoboit Valley	2009	2nd term
Robert Chisholm	New Democratic	Dartmouth—Cole Harbour	2011	1st term
Megan Leslie	New Democratic	Halifax	2008	2nd term
Geoff Regan	Liberal	Halifax West	1993, 2000	6th term*
Scott Brison	Liberal	Kings—Hants	1997, (Note: First elected as a Progressive Conservative) 2000	6th term*
Peter Stoffer	New Democratic	Sackville—Eastern Shore	1997	6th term
Gerald Keddy ‡	Conservative	South Shore—St. Margaret's	1997	6th term
Mark Eyking	Liberal	Sydney—Victoria	2000	5th term
Greg Kerr	Conservative	West Nova	2008	2nd term

=== Ontario ===
Name	Party	Electoral district	First elected / previously elected	No. of terms
**Chris Alexander** ‡	Conservative	Ajax—Pickering	2011	1st term
Carol Hughes	New Democratic	Algoma—Manitoulin—Kapuskasing	2008	2nd term
David Sweet	Conservative	Ancaster—Dundas—Flamborough—Westdale	2006	3rd term
Patrick Brown (until May 13, 2015)	Conservative	Barrie	2006	3rd term
Vacant		Barrie	2006	3rd term
Matthew Kellway	New Democratic	Beaches—East York	2011	1st term
**Bal Gosal**	Conservative	Bramalea—Gore—Malton	2011	1st term
Parm Gill ‡	Conservative	Brampton—Springdale	2011	1st term
Kyle Seeback	Conservative	Brampton West	2011	1st term
Phil McColeman	Conservative	Brant	2008	2nd term
Larry Miller	Conservative	Bruce—Grey—Owen Sound	2004	4th term
Mike Wallace	Conservative	Burlington	2006	3rd term
**Gary Goodyear**	Conservative	Cambridge	2004	4th term
**Gordon O'Connor**	Conservative	Carleton—Mississippi Mills	2004	4th term
Dave Van Kesteren	Conservative	Chatham-Kent—Essex	2006	3rd term
Andrew Cash	New Democratic	Davenport	2011	1st term
Joe Daniel	Conservative	Don Valley East	2011	1st term
John Carmichael	Conservative	Don Valley West	2011	1st term
David Tilson	Conservative	Dufferin—Caledon	2004	4th term
**Bev Oda** (until July 31, 2012)	Conservative	Durham	2004	4th term
**Erin O'Toole** ‡ (after November 26, 2012)	Conservative	Durham	2012	1st term
**Joe Oliver**	Conservative	Eglinton—Lawrence	2011	1st term
Joe Preston	Conservative	Elgin—Middlesex—London	2004	4th term
Jeff Watson ‡	Conservative	Essex	2004	4th term
Ted Opitz	Conservative	Etobicoke Centre	2011	1st term
Bernard Trottier ‡	Conservative	Etobicoke—Lakeshore	2011	1st term
Kirsty Duncan	Liberal	Etobicoke North	2008	2nd term
Pierre Lemieux ‡	Conservative	Glengarry—Prescott—Russell	2006	3rd term
Frank Valeriote	Liberal	Guelph	2008	2nd term
**Diane Finley**	Conservative	Haldimand—Norfolk	2004	4th term
Barry Devolin	Conservative	Haliburton—Kawartha Lakes—Brock	2004	4th term
**Lisa Raitt**	Conservative	Halton	2008	2nd term
David Christopherson	New Democratic	Hamilton Centre	2004	4th term
Wayne Marston	New Democratic	Hamilton East—Stoney Creek	2006	3rd term
Chris Charlton	New Democratic	Hamilton Mountain	2006	3rd term
Ben Lobb	Conservative	Huron—Bruce	2008	2nd term
**Greg Rickford** ‡	Conservative	Kenora	2008	2nd term
Ted Hsu	Liberal	Kingston and the Islands	2011	1st term
Stephen Woodworth	Conservative	Kitchener Centre	2008	2nd term
Harold Albrecht	Conservative	Kitchener—Conestoga	2006	3rd term
Peter Braid ‡	Conservative	Kitchener—Waterloo	2008	2nd term
Bev Shipley	Conservative	Lambton—Kent—Middlesex	2006	3rd term
Scott Reid	Conservative	Lanark—Frontenac—Lennox and Addington	2000	5th term
Gord Brown	Conservative	Leeds—Grenville	2004	4th term
Irene Mathyssen	New Democratic	London—Fanshawe	2006	3rd term
Susan Truppe ‡	Conservative	London North Centre	2011	1st term
**Ed Holder**	Conservative	London West	2008	2nd term
John McCallum	Liberal	Markham—Unionville	2000	5th term
Eve Adams ‡	Conservative	Mississauga—Brampton South	2011	1st term
Eve Adams ‡	Liberal^{e}	Mississauga—Brampton South	2011	1st term
Wladyslaw Lizon	Conservative	Mississauga East—Cooksville	2011	1st term
Bob Dechert ‡	Conservative	Mississauga—Erindale	2008	2nd term
Stella Ambler	Conservative	Mississauga South	2011	1st term
Brad Butt	Conservative	Mississauga—Streetsville	2011	1st term
**Pierre Poilievre** ‡	Conservative	Nepean—Carleton	2004	4th term
Lois Brown ‡	Conservative	Newmarket—Aurora	2008	2nd term
**Rob Nicholson**	Conservative	Niagara Falls	1984, 2004	6th term*
Dean Allison	Conservative	Niagara West—Glanbrook	2004	4th term
Claude Gravelle	New Democratic	Nickel Belt	2008	2nd term
Jay Aspin	Conservative	Nipissing—Timiskaming	2011	1st term
Rick Norlock	Conservative	Northumberland—Quinte West	2006	3rd term
Terence Young	Conservative	Oakville	2008	2nd term
Paul Calandra ‡	Conservative	Oak Ridges—Markham	2008	2nd term
Colin Carrie ‡	Conservative	Oshawa	2004	4th term
Paul Dewar	New Democratic	Ottawa Centre	2006	3rd term
Royal Galipeau	Conservative	Ottawa—Orléans	2006	3rd term
David McGuinty	Liberal	Ottawa South	2004	4th term
Mauril Bélanger	Liberal	Ottawa—Vanier	1995	7th term
**John Baird** (until March 16, 2015)	Conservative	Ottawa West—Nepean	2006	3rd term
Vacant		Ottawa West—Nepean	2006	3rd term
Dave MacKenzie	Conservative	Oxford	2004	4th term
Peggy Nash	New Democratic	Parkdale—High Park	2006, 2011	2nd term*
**Tony Clement**	Conservative	Parry Sound-Muskoka	2006	3rd term
Gary Schellenberger	Conservative	Perth Wellington	2003	5th term
Dean Del Mastro ‡ (until November 5, 2014)	Conservative	Peterborough	2006	3rd term
Dean Del Mastro ‡ (until November 5, 2014)	Independent Conservative^{f}	Peterborough	2006	3rd term
Vacant		Peterborough	2006	3rd term
Corneliu Chisu	Conservative	Pickering—Scarborough East	2011	1st term
Daryl Kramp	Conservative	Prince Edward—Hastings	2004	4th term
Cheryl Gallant	Conservative	Renfrew—Nipissing—Pembroke	2000	5th term
Costas Menegakis ‡	Conservative	Richmond Hill	2011	1st term
Pat Davidson	Conservative	Sarnia—Lambton	2006	3rd term
Bryan Hayes	Conservative	Sault Ste. Marie	2011	1st term
Jim Karygiannis (until April 1, 2014)	Liberal	Scarborough—Agincourt	1988	8th term
Arnold Chan (after June 30, 2014)	Liberal	Scarborough—Agincourt	2014	1st term
Roxanne James ‡	Conservative	Scarborough Centre	2011	1st term
John McKay	Liberal	Scarborough-Guildwood	1997	6th term
Dan Harris	New Democratic	Scarborough Southwest	2011	1st term
Rathika Sitsabaiesan	New Democratic	Scarborough—Rouge River	2011	1st term
**Kellie Leitch** ‡	Conservative	Simcoe—Grey	2011	1st term
Bruce Stanton	Conservative	Simcoe North	2006	3rd term
Rick Dykstra ‡	Conservative	St. Catharines	2006	3rd term
Carolyn Bennett	Liberal	St. Paul's	1997	6th term
Guy Lauzon	Conservative	Stormont—Dundas—South Glengarry	2004	4th term
Glenn Thibeault (until January 5, 2015)	New Democratic	Sudbury	2008	2nd term
Vacant		Sudbury	2008	2nd term
**Peter Kent**	Conservative	Thornhill	2008	2nd term
John Rafferty	New Democratic	Thunder Bay—Rainy River	2008	2nd term
Bruce Hyer	New Democratic	Thunder Bay—Superior North	2008	2nd term
Bruce Hyer	Independent	Thunder Bay—Superior North	2008	2nd term
Bruce Hyer	Green^{g}	Thunder Bay—Superior North	2008	2nd term
Charlie Angus	New Democratic	Timmins-James Bay	2004	4th term
Bob Rae^{h} (until July 31, 2013)	Liberal	Toronto Centre	1978, (Note: Broadview/Broadview—Greenwood (First elected as a New Democrat)) 2008	6th term*
Chrystia Freeland (after November 25, 2013)	Liberal	Toronto Centre	2013	1st term
Jack Layton^{i} (until August 22, 2011)	New Democratic	Toronto—Danforth	2004	4th term
Craig Scott (after March 19, 2012)	New Democratic	Toronto—Danforth	2012	1st term
Olivia Chow (until March 12, 2014)	New Democratic	Trinity—Spadina	2006	3rd term
Adam Vaughan (after June 30, 2014)	Liberal	Trinity—Spadina	2014	1st term
**Julian Fantino**	Conservative	Vaughan	2010	2nd term
Malcolm Allen	New Democratic	Welland	2008	2nd term
Michael Chong	Conservative	Wellington—Halton Hills	2004	4th term
**Jim Flaherty** (until April 10, 2014)	Conservative	Whitby—Oshawa	2006	3rd term
Pat Perkins (after November 17, 2014)	Conservative	Whitby—Oshawa	2014	1st term
Chungsen Leung ‡	Conservative	Willowdale	2011	1st term
Joe Comartin	New Democratic	Windsor—Tecumseh	2000	5th term
Brian Masse	New Democratic	Windsor West	2002	5th term
Mark Adler	Conservative	York Centre	2011	1st term
**Peter Van Loan**	Conservative	York—Simcoe	2004	4th term
Mike Sullivan	New Democratic	York South—Weston	2011	1st term
Judy Sgro	Liberal	York West	1999	6th term

- **^e** Changed affiliation on February 9, 2015.
- **^f** Left caucus on September 26, 2013.
- **^g** Left New Democratic caucus April 23, 2012. Joined Green caucus December 13, 2013.
- **^h** Liberal leader until April 14, 2013.
- **^i** New Democratic leader until July 28, 2011.

=== Prince Edward Island ===
Name	Party	Electoral district	First elected / previously elected	No. of terms
Lawrence MacAulay	Liberal	Cardigan	1988	8th term
Sean Casey	Liberal	Charlottetown	2011	1st term
**Gail Shea**	Conservative	Egmont	2008	2nd term
Wayne Easter	Liberal	Malpeque	1993	7th term

=== Quebec ===
Name	Party	Electoral district	First elected / previously elected	No. of terms
Romeo Saganash	New Democratic	Abitibi—Baie-James—Nunavik—Eeyou	2011	1st term
Christine Moore	New Democratic	Abitibi—Témiscamingue	2011	1st term
Maria Mourani	Bloc Québécois	Ahuntsic	2006	3rd term
Maria Mourani	Independent^{j}	Ahuntsic	2006	3rd term
Rosane Doré Lefebvre	New Democratic	Alfred-Pellan	2011	1st term
Mylène Freeman	New Democratic	Argenteuil—Papineau—Mirabel	2011	1st term
Louis Plamondon	Bloc Québécois	Bas-Richelieu—Nicolet—Bécancour	1984	9th term
**Maxime Bernier**	Conservative	Beauce	2006	3rd term
Anne Minh-Thu Quach	New Democratic	Beauharnois—Salaberry	2011	1st term
Raymond Côté	New Democratic	Beauport—Limoilou	2011	1st term
Ruth Ellen Brosseau	New Democratic	Berthier—Maskinongé	2011	1st term
Denis Coderre (until June 2, 2013)	Liberal	Bourassa	1997	6th term
Emmanuel Dubourg (after November 25, 2013)	Liberal	Bourassa	2013	1st term
Pierre Jacob	New Democratic	Brome—Missisquoi	2011	1st term
Hoang Mai	New Democratic	Brossard—La Prairie	2011	1st term
Matthew Dubé	New Democratic	Chambly—Borduas	2011	1st term
Anne-Marie Day	New Democratic	Charlesbourg—Haute-Saint-Charles	2011	1st term
Sylvain Chicoine	New Democratic	Châteauguay—Saint-Constant	2011	1st term
Dany Morin	New Democratic	Chicoutimi—Le Fjord	2011	1st term
Jean Rousseau	New Democratic	Compton—Stanstead	2011	1st term
François Choquette	New Democratic	Drummond	2011	1st term
Philip Toone	New Democratic	Gaspésie—Îles-de-la-Madeleine	2011	1st term
Françoise Boivin	New Democratic	Gatineau	2004, (Note: First elected as a Liberal) 2011	2nd term*
Jean-François Fortin	Bloc Québécois	Haute-Gaspésie—La Mitis—Matane—Matapédia	2011	1st term
Jean-François Fortin	Independent	Haute-Gaspésie—La Mitis—Matane—Matapédia	2011	1st term
Jean-François Fortin	Strength in Democracy^{k}	Haute-Gaspésie—La Mitis—Matane—Matapédia	2011	1st term
Marjolaine Boutin-Sweet	New Democratic	Hochelaga	2011	1st term
Paulina Ayala	New Democratic	Honoré-Mercier	2011	1st term
Nycole Turmel^{l}	New Democratic	Hull—Aylmer	2011	1st term
Tyrone Benskin	New Democratic	Jeanne-Le Ber	2011	1st term
Francine Raynault	New Democratic	Joliette	2011	1st term
Claude Patry	New Democratic	Jonquière—Alma	2011	1st term
Claude Patry	Bloc Québécois^{m}	Jonquière—Alma	2011	1st term
Ève Péclet	New Democratic	La Pointe-de-l'Île	2011	1st term
Francis Scarpaleggia	Liberal	Lac-Saint-Louis	2004	4th term
Hélène LeBlanc	New Democratic	LaSalle—Émard	2011	1st term
Marc-André Morin	New Democratic	Laurentides—Labelle	2011	1st term
Hélène Laverdière	New Democratic	Laurier—Sainte-Marie	2011	1st term
José Nunez-Melo	New Democratic	Laval	2011	1st term
François Pilon	New Democratic	Laval—Les Îles	2011	1st term
**Steven Blaney**	Conservative	Lévis—Bellechasse	2006	3rd term
Pierre Nantel	New Democratic	Longueuil—Pierre-Boucher	2011	1st term
Jacques Gourde ‡	Conservative	Lotbinière—Chutes-de-la-Chaudière	2006	3rd term
Denis Blanchette	New Democratic	Louis-Hébert	2011	1st term
Alexandrine Latendresse	New Democratic	Louis-Saint-Laurent	2011	1st term
Jonathan Genest-Jourdain	New Democratic	Manicouagan	2011	1st term
Alain Giguère	New Democratic	Marc-Aurèle-Fortin	2011	1st term
**Christian Paradis**	Conservative	Mégantic—L'Érable	2006	3rd term
Manon Perreault	New Democratic	Montcalm	2011	1st term
Manon Perreault	Independent^{n}	Montcalm	2011	1st term
François Lapointe	New Democratic	Montmagny—L'Islet—Kamouraska—Rivière-du-Loup	2011	1st term
Jonathan Tremblay	New Democratic	Montmorency—Charlevoix—Haute-Côte-Nord	2011	1st term
Irwin Cotler	Liberal	Mount Royal	1999	6th term
Isabelle Morin	New Democratic	Notre-Dame-de-Grâce—Lachine	2011	1st term
Thomas Mulcair^{o}	New Democratic	Outremont	2007	3rd term
Justin Trudeau^{p}	Liberal	Papineau	2008	2nd term
Lysane Blanchette-Lamothe	New Democratic	Pierrefonds—Dollard	2011	1st term
Mathieu Ravignat	New Democratic	Pontiac	2011	1st term
Élaine Michaud	New Democratic	Portneuf—Jacques-Cartier	2011	1st term
Annick Papillon	New Democratic	Québec	2011	1st term
Jean-François Larose	New Democratic	Repentigny	2011	1st term
Jean-François Larose	Strength in Democracy^{q}	Repentigny	2011	1st term
André Bellavance	Bloc Québécois	Richmond—Arthabaska	2004	4th term
André Bellavance	Independent^{r}	Richmond—Arthabaska	2004	4th term
Guy Caron	New Democratic	Rimouski-Neigette—Témiscouata—Les Basques	2011	1st term
Laurin Liu	New Democratic	Rivière-des-Mille-Îles	2011	1st term
Pierre Dionne Labelle	New Democratic	Rivière-du-Nord	2011	1st term
**Denis Lebel**	Conservative	Roberval—Lac-Saint-Jean	2007	3rd term
Alexandre Boulerice	New Democratic	Rosemont—La Petite-Patrie	2011	1st term
Djaouida Sellah	New Democratic	Saint-Bruno—Saint-Hubert	2011	1st term
Marie-Claude Morin	New Democratic	Saint-Hyacinthe—Bagot	2011	1st term
Tarik Brahmi	New Democratic	Saint-Jean	2011	1st term
Sadia Groguhé	New Democratic	Saint-Lambert	2011	1st term
Stéphane Dion	Liberal	Saint-Laurent—Cartierville	1996	7th term
Massimo Pacetti	Liberal	Saint-Léonard—Saint-Michel	2002	5th term
Massimo Pacetti	Independent^{s}	Saint-Léonard—Saint-Michel	2002	5th term
Lise St-Denis	New Democratic	Saint-Maurice—Champlain	2011	1st term
Lise St-Denis	Liberal^{t}	Saint-Maurice—Champlain	2011	1st term
Réjean Genest	New Democratic	Shefford	2011	1st term
Pierre-Luc Dusseault	New Democratic	Sherbrooke	2011	1st term
Charmaine Borg	New Democratic	Terrebonne—Blainville	2011	1st term
Robert Aubin	New Democratic	Trois-Rivières	2011	1st term
Jamie Nicholls	New Democratic	Vaudreuil-Soulanges	2011	1st term
Sana Hassainia	New Democratic	Verchères—Les Patriotes	2011	1st term
Sana Hassainia	Independent^{u}	Verchères—Les Patriotes	2011	1st term
Marc Garneau	Liberal	Westmount—Ville-Marie	2008	2nd term

- **^j** Expelled from caucus September 12, 2013.
- **^k** Resigned from Bloc Québécois caucus August 12, 2014. Sat as an independent until founding Strength in Democracy October 21, 2014.
- **^l** New Democratic leader from July 28, 2011, to March 24, 2012.
- **^m** Changed affiliation on February 27, 2013.
- **^n** Suspended from caucus June 6, 2014.
- **^o** New Democratic leader since March 24, 2012.
- **^p** Liberal leader since April 14, 2013.
- **^q** Changed affiliation on October 21, 2014.
- **^r** Resigned from caucus August 25, 2014.
- **^s** Suspended from caucus November 5, 2014.
- **^t** Changed affiliation on January 10, 2012.
- **^u** Changed affiliation on August 20, 2014.

=== Saskatchewan ===
Name	Party	Electoral district	First elected / previously elected	No. of terms
**Gerry Ritz**	Conservative	Battlefords—Lloydminster	1997	6th term
**Lynne Yelich**	Conservative	Blackstrap	2000	5th term
David L. Anderson ‡	Conservative	Cypress Hills—Grasslands	2000	5th term
Rob Clarke	Conservative	Desnethé—Missinippi—Churchill River	2008	3rd term
Ray Boughen	Conservative	Palliser	2008	2nd term
Randy Hoback	Conservative	Prince Albert	2008	2nd term
Tom Lukiwski ‡	Conservative	Regina—Lumsden—Lake Centre	2004	4th term
Andrew Scheer †	Conservative	Regina—Qu'Appelle	2004	4th term
Brad Trost	Conservative	Saskatoon—Humboldt	2004	4th term
Kelly Block ‡	Conservative	Saskatoon—Rosetown—Biggar	2008	2nd term
Maurice Vellacott	Conservative	Saskatoon—Wanuskewin	1997	6th term
Ed Komarnicki	Conservative	Souris—Moose Mountain	2004	4th term
Ralph Goodale	Liberal	Wascana	1974, (Note: Assiniboia) 1993	8th term*
Garry Breitkreuz	Conservative	Yorkton—Melville	1993	7th term

=== Territories ===
Name	Party	Electoral district	First elected / previously elected	No. of terms
**Leona Aglukkaq**	Conservative	Nunavut	2008	2nd term
Dennis Bevington	New Democratic	Northwest Territories (Western Arctic until 2014)	2006	3rd term
Ryan Leef	Conservative	Yukon	2011	1st term

== Changes since the 41st election ==
The party standings have changed as follows:

May 2, 2011 – January 17, 2014
Number of members per party by date	2011			2012							2013													
Number of members per party by date	May 2	Aug 22	Dec 5	Jan 10	Mar 19	Apr 23	May 30	Jul 31	Aug 31	Nov 26	Feb 27	Mar 14	May 13	Jun 2	Jun 5	Jun 6	Jul 9	Jul 31	Aug 31	Sep 12	Sep 26	Nov 6	Nov 25	Dec 13
Conservative	166		165				164	163		165		164			163	164	163		162		161	160	162	
New Democratic	103	102		101	102	101			100	101	100													
Liberal	34			35									36	35				34					36	
Bloc Québécois	4										5									4				
Green	1																							2
Independent	0					1									2					3				2
Independent Conservative	0		1													0					1			
Total members	308	307			308		307	306	305	308		307	308	307			306	305	304			303	307	
Vacant	0	1			0		1	2	3	0		1	0	1			2	3	4			5	1	
Government majority	24	25	23		22		21	20	21	22		21	20	21	19	21	20	21	20		18	17		

January 17, 2014 – present
Number of members per party by date	2014													2015				
Number of members per party by date	Jan 17	Mar 12	Apr 1	Apr 10	Jun 6	Jun 30	Aug 12	Aug 20	Aug 25	Sep 17	Oct 21	Nov 5	Nov 17	Jan 5	Feb 9	Mar 16	Mar 31	May 13
Conservative	161			160		162				161			163		162	161	160	159
New Democratic	100	99			98			97			96			95				
Liberal	36		35			37						35			36			
Bloc Québécois	4						3		2									
Green	2																	
Strength in Democracy	0										2							
Independent	2				3		4	5	6		5	7					8	
Independent Conservative	1											0						
Total members	306	305	304	303		307				306		305	307	306		305		304
Vacant	2	3	4	5		1				2		3	1	2		3		4
Government majority	16	17	18	17						16		17	19	20	18	17	15	14

=== Membership changes ===
Membership changes in the 41st Parliament
Date	Name	District	Party	Reason
August 22, 2011	Jack Layton	Toronto—Danforth	New Democratic	Died of cancer.
December 5, 2011	Peter Goldring	Edmonton East	Independent Conservative	Voluntarily left the Conservative caucus, but retained affiliation.
January 10, 2012	Lise St-Denis	Saint-Maurice—Champlain	Liberal	Changed affiliation from New Democratic to Liberal.
March 19, 2012	Craig Scott	Toronto—Danforth	New Democratic	Elected in a by-election.
April 23, 2012	Bruce Hyer	Thunder Bay—Superior North	Independent	Voluntarily left the New Democratic caucus, but retained party membership.
May 30, 2012	Lee Richardson	Calgary Centre	Conservative	Resigned from the House to accept a job working for Alberta Premier Alison Redford.
July 31, 2012	Bev Oda	Durham	Conservative	Voluntarily resigned from the Cabinet and the House following a series of personal expense scandals.
August 31, 2012	Denise Savoie	Victoria	New Democratic	Voluntarily resigned from Parliament for health reasons.
November 26, 2012	Joan Crockatt	Calgary Centre	Conservative	Elected in a by-election.
November 26, 2012	Erin O'Toole	Durham	Conservative	Elected in a by-election
November 26, 2012	Murray Rankin	Victoria	New Democratic	Elected in a by-election.
February 27, 2013	Claude Patry	Jonquière—Alma	Bloc Québécois	Changed affiliation from New Democratic to Bloc Québécois.
March 14, 2013	Peter Penashue	Labrador	Conservative	Resigned to run in a by-election.
May 13, 2013	Yvonne Jones	Labrador	Liberal	Elected in a by-election.
June 2, 2013	Denis Coderre	Bourassa	Liberal	Resigned to run for mayor of Montreal.
June 5, 2013	Brent Rathgeber	Edmonton—St. Albert	Independent	Voluntarily left the Conservative caucus, citing the Conservative party's "lack of commitment to transparency and open government".
June 6, 2013	Peter Goldring	Edmonton East	Conservative	Rejoined Conservative caucus.
July 9, 2013	Vic Toews	Provencher	Conservative	Resigned citing a desire to spend more time with his family.
July 31, 2013	Bob Rae	Toronto Centre	Liberal	Resigned to become First Nations negotiator in Ontario.
August 31, 2013	Merv Tweed	Brandon—Souris	Conservative	Resigned to become President of OmniTRAX Canada.
September 12, 2013	Maria Mourani	Ahuntsic	Independent	Expelled from Bloc Québécois caucus due to comments against the provincial Parti Québécois government's proposed Quebec Charter of Values.
September 26, 2013	Dean Del Mastro	Peterborough	Independent Conservative	Left caucus after being charged with breaking campaign rules during the 2008 election, but retained affiliation.
November 6, 2013	Ted Menzies	Macleod	Conservative	Resigned to become president and CEO of CropLife Canada.
November 25, 2013	Emmanuel Dubourg	Bourassa	Liberal	Elected in a by-election.
November 25, 2013	Ted Falk	Provencher	Conservative	Elected in a by-election.
November 25, 2013	Chrystia Freeland	Toronto Centre	Liberal	Elected in a by-election.
November 25, 2013	Larry Maguire	Brandon—Souris	Conservative	Elected in a by-election.
December 13, 2013	Bruce Hyer	Thunder Bay—Superior North	Green	Joined Green caucus.
January 17, 2014	Brian Jean	Fort McMurray—Athabasca	Conservative	Resigned to return to private life.
March 12, 2014	Olivia Chow	Trinity—Spadina	New Democratic	Resigned to run for mayor of Toronto.
April 1, 2014	Jim Karygiannis	Scarborough—Agincourt	Liberal	Resigned to enter Toronto municipal politics.
April 10, 2014	Jim Flaherty	Whitby—Oshawa	Conservative	Died of a heart attack.
June 6, 2014	Manon Perreault	Montcalm	Independent	Suspended from New Democratic caucus after being charged with public mischief.
June 30, 2014	John Barlow	Macleod	Conservative	Elected in a by-election.
June 30, 2014	David Yurdiga	Fort McMurray—Athabasca	Conservative	Elected in a by-election.
June 30, 2014	Adam Vaughan	Trinity—Spadina	Liberal	Elected in a by-election.
June 30, 2014	Arnold Chan	Scarborough—Agincourt	Liberal	Elected in a by-election.
August 12, 2014	Jean-François Fortin	Haute-Gaspésie—La Mitis—Matane—Matapédia	Independent	Resigned from Bloc Québécois caucus due to differences with newly elected Party Leader Mario Beaulieu.
August 20, 2014	Sana Hassainia	Verchères—Les Patriotes	Independent	Resigned from New Democratic caucus due to a conflict with the party over its stance on the 2014 Israel–Gaza conflict.
August 25, 2014	André Bellavance	Richmond—Arthabaska	Independent	Resigned from Bloc Québécois caucus due to differences with newly elected Party Leader Mario Beaulieu.
September 17, 2014	Rob Merrifield	Yellowhead	Conservative	Resigned to accept an appointment from Alberta Premier Jim Prentice as the province's envoy to the United States.
October 21, 2014	Jean-François Fortin	Haute-Gaspésie—La Mitis—Matane—Matapédia	Strength in Democracy	Co-created Strength in Democracy.
October 21, 2014	Jean-François Larose	Repentigny	Strength in Democracy	Resigned from New Democratic caucus upon co-creating Strength in Democracy.
November 5, 2014	Scott Andrews	Avalon	Independent	Suspended from Liberal caucus following allegations of sexual harassment.
November 5, 2014	Massimo Pacetti	Saint-Léonard—Saint-Michel	Independent	Suspended from Liberal caucus following allegations of sexual harassment.
November 5, 2014	Dean Del Mastro	Peterborough	Independent Conservative	Resigned his seat after being found guilty on three counts of violating election spending limits.
November 17, 2014	Pat Perkins	Whitby—Oshawa	Conservative	Elected in a by-election.
November 17, 2014	Jim Eglinski	Yellowhead	Conservative	Elected in a by-election.
January 5, 2015	Glenn Thibeault	Sudbury	New Democratic	Resigned to run in a provincial by-election.
February 9, 2015	Eve Adams	Mississauga—Brampton South	Liberal	Changed affiliation from Conservative to Liberal.
March 16, 2015	John Baird	Ottawa West—Nepean	Conservative	Resigned from cabinet, and subsequently from parliament, to enter private life.
March 31, 2015	James Lunney	Nanaimo—Alberni	Independent	Left caucus due to concerns about religious freedom.
May 13, 2015	Patrick Brown	Barrie	Conservative	Resigned after being elected leader of the Progressive Conservative Party of Ontario.

== See also ==
- List of senators in the 41st Parliament of Canada
- Women in the 41st Canadian Parliament
- By-elections to the 41st Canadian Parliament
