= Thin capitalisation =

Financial concept

A company is said to be thinly capitalised when the level of its debt is much greater than its equity capital, i.e. its gearing, or leverage, is very high. An entity's debt-to-equity funding is sometimes expressed as a ratio. For example, a gearing ratio of 1.5:1 means that for every $1 of equity the entity has $1.5 of debt.

A high gearing ratio can create problems for:

- creditors, which bear the solvency risk of the company, and
- revenue authorities, which are concerned about excessive interest claims.

== Credit risk ==
If the shareholders have introduced only a nominal amount of paid-up share capital, then the company has lower financial reserves with which to meet its obligations. If all or most of the company's capital comes from debt, which (unlike equity) needs to be serviced, and ultimately repaid, it means that the providers of capital are ultimately competing with the company's trade creditors for the same capital resources.

In general, most common law countries tend not to employ thin capitalisation rules in relation to raising and maintenance of capital. However, a number of civil law jurisdictions do.

However, in almost all jurisdictions there are certain types of regulated entity which require a certain amount, or a certain proportion, of paid-up share capital to be licensed to trade. The most common examples of this are banks and insurance companies. This is because if such companies were to fail and go into liquidation the economic effect of such failures can lead to a domino effect, which can have catastrophic consequences for other businesses and, ultimately, national economies.

== Tax issues ==
Even where countries’ corporate laws permit companies to be thinly capitalised, revenue authorities in those countries will often limit the amount that a company can claim as a tax deduction on interest, particularly when it receives loans at non-commercial rates (e.g. from connected parties). However, some countries simply disallow interest deductions above a certain level from all sources when the company is considered to be too highly geared under applicable tax regulations.

Some tax authorities limit the applicability of thin capitalisation rules to corporate groups with foreign entities to avoid “base erosion and profit shifting" to other jurisdictions. The United States “earnings stripping” rules are an example. Hong Kong protects tax revenue by prohibiting payers from claiming tax deductions for interest paid to foreign entities, thus eliminating the possibility of using thin capitalisation to shift income to a lower-tax jurisdiction.

Thin capitalisation rules determine how much of the interest paid on corporate debt is deductible for tax purposes. Such rules are of interest to private-equity firms, which use significant amounts of debt to finance leveraged buyouts, and in the context of strategic acquisitions, where the purchaser wishes to push debt into higher taxed countries with significant pre-tax income.

== See also ==
- Base Erosion and Profit Shifting
