= Canada Employment Insurance Financing Board =

Crown corporation of the Government of Canada

The Canada Employment Insurance Financing Board (CEIFB) was a Crown corporation of the Government of Canada, created in 2008, that began its operations in 2010 and was dissolved in 2013. As a parent Crown corporation, under Part X of the Financial Administration Act, CEIFB reported to Parliament through the Minister of Human Resources and Skills Development.

== Mandate ==
Canada's employment insurance program supports Canadian employees during periods of unemployment. The program is funded through the contributions of Canadian employers and employees. The task of CEIFB was to set EI premiums in a transparent way and to temporarily hold and manage any surplus EI premiums that accrued from January 1, 2009 onwards. In practice, the CEIFB's mandate never allowed it to exercise any authority, and it became a rubber stamp for the government in the setting of EI premium rates. The organization was dissolved in 2013, after having spent close to $5 million over 3 years.

== Corporate Objectives ==
1. Develop appropriate corporate structures and policies:

The CEIFB will strengthen its corporate governance by finalizing and implementing its Code of Ethics and Conduct and developing detailed conflict of interest procedures.

2. Establish the necessary human resources:

The CEIFB will appoint a Chief Actuary, recruit additional staff and develop an HR management framework.

3. Fulfill legislated mandate:

The CEIFB will set the EI premium rate for 2011, establish an independent review of the Chief Actuary's methodology, develop a risk-management framework, and begin to put in place investment policies, systems and procedures to enable the investment of funds (once they are received).

4. Develop a robust reporting system:

The CEIFB will ensure that all of its statutory reporting requirements are met, and develop Corporate Plans against which future performance can be measured and reported.

== Criticism ==
The constraints under which the CEIFB was created prevented it from exercising any meaningful role. The Mowat Centre noted that: "In 2008, the federal government created the CEIFB, an ostensibly autonomous, independent board mandated to set premiums. It was tasked with balancing revenues and expenditures over time, with any surpluses to be used to lower future premiums. However, the board has no mandate to ensure premiums remain stable over the business cycle. Also, the board's first attempt to set the premium rate in 2011 was overridden by the federal government (Department of Finance Canada, 2010)." Another commentator stated that: "Given that the government retained ultimate control over the setting of rates, and has done so since 2008, there never was any need for the CEIFB to exist."

On January 18, 2012, the CBC aired the following story during its flagship news broadcast The National: "EI financing agency spends millions doing nothing".
