= Colin Kenny (politician) =

Canadian politician (born 1943)

The Honourable Colin Kenny

Canadian Senator from Ontario
- In office June 29, 1984 – February 2, 2018
- Nominated by: Pierre Trudeau
- Appointed by: Jeanne Sauvé

Personal details
- Born: James Colin Ramsey Kenny; December 10, 1943 (age 82) Montreal, Quebec, Canada
- Party: Liberal (until 2013); Independent Liberal (2014-2018)
- Education: Norwich University; Tuck School of Business

James Colin Ramsey Kenny (born December 10, 1943) is a former Canadian Senator. A member of the Liberal Party, he was appointed to the Senate in 1984 by Pierre Trudeau to represent the Rideau region of Ontario.

On January 31, 2018, it was announced that Kenny had informed the Speaker of the Senate that he would be retiring effective February 2, 2018, ten months ahead of his scheduled retirement date, due to ill health.

== Early life and career ==
James Colin Ramsey Kenny was born in Montreal, Quebec, on December 10, 1943, to a wealthy Rockliffe family. His stepfather Roy H. Hyndman was the final president of Charles Ogilvy Ltd. a major Ottawa department store.

Kenny received his high school education at Bishop's College School. He received a Bachelor of Science degree in 1966 from Norwich University. In 1967, he received a Public Service Fellowship from the Tuck School of Business.

== Political career ==
Kenny's political career began in 1968 when he served as executive director of the Liberal Party of Canada in Ontario, a post he would hold until 1970. He worked in the Pierre Trudeau's Prime Minister's Office from 1969 until 1979, rising from special assistant to take up such roles as director of operations, policy advisor, and Principal Secretary to Prime Minister.

Following the Liberal government's defeat in the 1979 election, he worked as an executive with Dome Petroleum, until being appointed to the Senate on the recommendation of Trudeau in 1984.

As a member of the Upper House, Kenny has been active in writing anti-smoking legislation and legislation encouraging the use of alternative fuels. He has also represented Canada as a delegate to the Organisation for Economic Co-operation and Development (OECD) and the European Bank for Reconstruction and Development.

The SCONSAD reports examine areas of national security and defence, including airports, seaports, border crossings, coasts, Emergency Preparedness, and the Canadian Forces.

In the 35th Parliament, Kenny was the Vice-Chair of the Standing Committee on Energy, the Environment and Natural Resources from 1994 to 1997. In the same parliament, he chaired the Senate Standing Committee on Internal Economy, Budgets and Administration from 1995 until 1997. In the 36th Parliament, Kenny was the chair of the Subcommittee on Human Resources of the Standing Committee on Internal Economy, Budgets and Administration from 1999 to 2000. Kenny also served as Vice-Chair of the Special Committee on Illegal Drugs from 2000 during 36th Parliament to 2002 during the 37th Parliament. From 2001 to 2009, Kenny was the first chair of the Senate committee on national security and defence.

In 2009, Kenny gained national spotlight with a YouTube video of the Senate Defence Committee where several heated arguments occurred in committee when the meeting was disrupted repetitively by senators choosing not to follow rules.

He is also a member of the Trilateral Commission.

In October 2013, CBC News reported that a former staffer of Kenny's had accused him of sexual harassment. Kenny withdrew from the Liberal caucus on November 21, 2013, pending the outcome of an investigation into the allegations. In April 2014 an independent investigator cleared Kenny on all three charges brought forward by his former employee. The findings were upheld by both Liberal and Conservative senate whips and the investigation was closed. The investigation was criticized because it did not look into evidence of complaints made by other woman besides the former assistant. After the initial CBC story broke, nine other woman made complaints against Kenny, including two who had been employed by his tanning salon and two who were employed by NATO when Kenny was part of the NATO Parliamentary Assembly in 2001. By the time the investigation had concluded Liberal leader Justin Trudeau had removed all Liberal senators from the party caucus, and Kenny joined the newly independent Senate Liberal caucus in June 2014.

In 2015, Canadian auditor general Michael Ferguson recommended that the Royal Canadian Mounted Police should investigate Kenny along with eight other senators for questionable expenses paid to staff for non-parliamentary work. Afterwards, Kenny repaid $30,000 in expenses which had been deemed unjustified.

After 2013 and 2016 CBC News reports that Kenny had reportedly used Senate personnel for tasks such as payings bills for his personal residence and making orders for his tanning salon business, the Senate ethics officer launched a preliminary review of his use of publicly funded parliamentary resources in May 2017.

At the end of January 2018, Kenny wrote the Speaker of the Senate to inform him that he would retire on February 2, 2018, ten months before his mandatory retirement date of December 2018, citing his ill health. The decision was made a day after Kenny's former staffer who had accused him of sexual harassment emailed Prime Minister Justin Trudeau asking him to re-open the investigation so it could hear from the other women complainants as well.

== See also ==
- List of Ontario senators.
- List of Bishop's College School alumni
