= Thanh Hai Ngo =

Canadian politician

The Honourable Thanh Hai Ngo
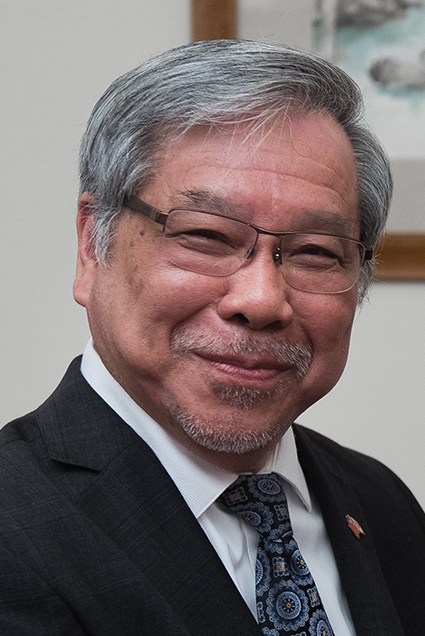

Canadian Senator from Ontario
- In office September 6, 2012 – January 3, 2022
- Nominated by: Stephen Harper
- Appointed by: David Johnston

Personal details
- Born: January 3, 1947 (age 79) South Vietnam
- Party: Conservative
- Education: University of Ottawa; University of Paris
- Occupation: Politician; teacher; diplomat
- Website: honourablengo.ca

Thanh Hai Ngo (Vietnamese: Ngô Thanh Hải; born January 3, 1947) is a retired Canadian politician who served as a senator from Ontario between 2012 and 2022. A member of the Conservative Party, Ngo was appointed to the Senate on the advice of Prime Minister Stephen Harper. He is the first senator of Vietnamese descent. He retired from the Senate upon reaching the mandatory retirement age of 75 on January 3, 2022.

== Background ==
Ngô was born in South Vietnam and was an officer of Republic of Vietnam Military Forces. He immigrated to Canada after the Fall of Saigon in April 1975. Senator Ngo has been very concerned with allegations of abuse of human rights in Vietnam.

He has a Bachelor of Arts (Honors) from the University of Paris and Bachelor and a Master of Education from the University of Ottawa. Until his appointment to the Senate in 2012, he had been a citizenship judge from 2007 to 2012.

He retired from the Senate upon reaching the mandatory retirement age of 75 on January 3, 2022.
