= Victor Oh =

Canadian politician

The Honourable Victor Oh
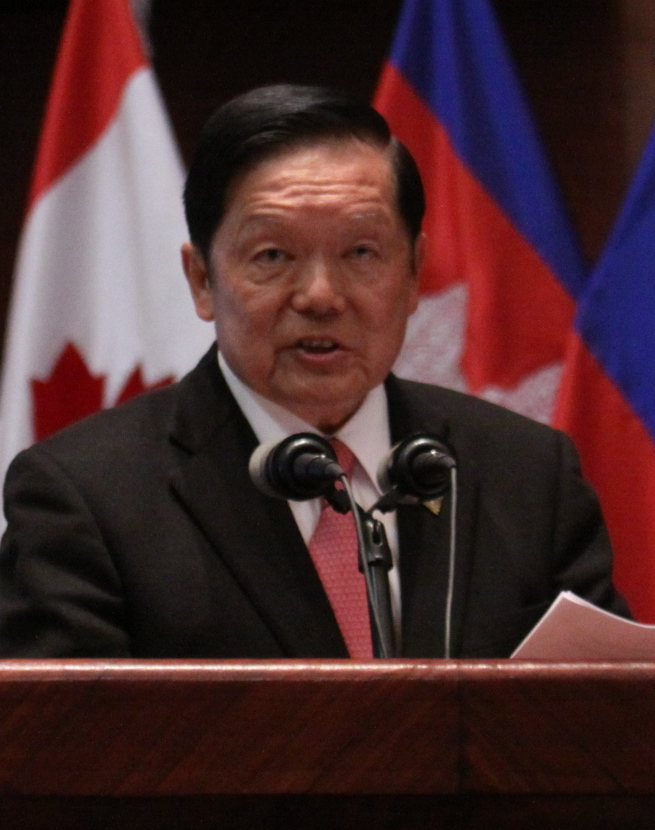

Canadian Senator from Ontario
- In office January 25, 2013 – June 10, 2024
- Nominated by: Stephen Harper
- Appointed by: David Johnston

Personal details
- Born: June 10, 1949 (age 77) Singapore
- Party: Conservative Party of Canada
- Spouse: Rosabella Chiu

Victor Oh (Chinese: 胡子修, born June 10, 1949) is a retired Singaporean-born Canadian politician who served as a Canadian senator from Ontario from January 2013 until his mandatory retirement in June 2024.

== Early life ==
Oh was born in the Singapore when it was a crown colony. His family has ancestral roots in Fujian, China. In Singapore, his family operated a real estate business and became acquainted with staff from the Canadian High Commission as several employees rented properties managed by his family. In 1978, when he was in his late twenties, Oh emigrated to Canada with his wife and children and settled in Mississauga, Ontario.

== Business career ==
Oh was the founding chairman of the Canada-China Business Communication Council and the former President of Wyford Holdings, a property development and management business.

== Senate of Canada ==
Oh was a member of the Standing Senate Committees on Foreign Affairs and International Trade, Agriculture and Forestry and National Security and Defence. He was also a member of the Special Senate Committee on the Arctic.

Oh was the vice-chair of the Canada-China Legislative Association and of the Canada-Japan Inter-Parliamentary Group in addition to a member of the Canada-Europe Parliamentary Association, the Canadian Section of ParlAmericas and the Canada-United States Inter-Parliamentary Group. He has also held executive positions in a number of parliamentary friendship groups including Canada-Bulgaria, Canada-Indonesia, Canada-Malaysia, Canada-Nordic-Baltic, Canada-Peru and Canada-Singapore.

In 2016, Senator Oh was the head of the Canadian parliamentary delegation at the 24th Annual Meeting of the Asia-Pacific Parliamentary Forum (APPF) held in Vancouver, British Columbia. On this same year, he joined the Parliamentary Network on the World Bank & International Monetary Fund, which provides a platform for parliamentarians from over 140 countries to advocate for increased accountability and transparency in International Financial Institutions and multilateral development financing.

Oh has also been involved in various initiatives to celebrate ethnic, religious, and cultural diversity in Canada.

Hazel McCallion, the former mayor of Mississauga, inspired Oh to get involved in public life. He notes that "her lifelong involvement with charitable work and her deep commitment to the public good was, and continues to be, a true testament of good leadership."

In June 2023, Oh advocated for the establishment of a foundation that would sue "messy reporters" and politicians who "try to smear" Chinese people.

Oh retired as a senator on June 10, 2024, upon reaching the mandatory retirement age of 75.

=== Conflict of interest investigation ===
In December 2017, it was reported that Victor Oh accepted trips to China paid for by the Chinese government or pro-Beijing business groups. In February 2020, the Senate's ethics watchdog found that Victor Oh broke the conflict of interest and ethics code by accepting and then failing to disclose an all-expenses-paid trip to China for himself and two other senators. On June 18, the Senate Ethics and Conflict of Interest Committee recommended that Oh be censured, and asked for him to apologize to the Senate.

=== Foreign interference allegation ===
During the public inquiry into Chinese government interference in the 2019 and 2021 Canadian federal elections, then-Conservative House of Commons leader Erin O'Toole considered expelling a Conservative senator from the party caucus over concerns that this senator directly or indirectly lobbied on behalf of a Chinese state-owned enterprise in a town in Ontario. Conservative staffers revealed that the senator O'Toole was referring to was Oh. Previously, during the 2017 conflict of interest investigation, Oh was reported to have met with United Front's officials during the Chinese-sponsored trips to discuss initiatives to build support for Beijing's policies in the Chinese overseas diaspora and influence the countries in which the diaspora live in.

== Recognition and awards ==
In 2011, Canadian Immigrant magazine named him one of the Top 25 Canadian Immigrant Award Winners.

Oh has served as the honorary chair of the board of the Canada Confederation of Shenzhen Associations (CCSA).
