= Tobias Enverga =

Canadian politician

The Honourable Tobias Enverga
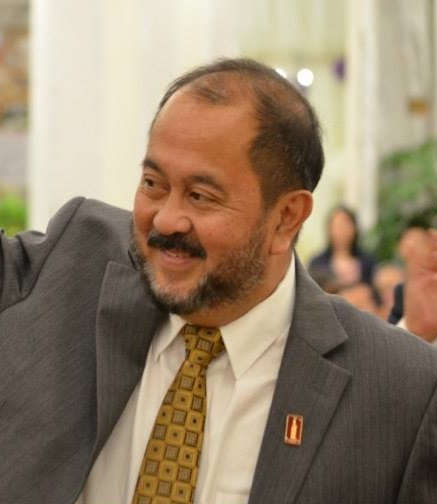

Canadian Senator from Ontario
- In office September 6, 2012 – November 16, 2017
- Nominated by: Stephen Harper
- Appointed by: David Johnston

TCDSB Trustee for Ward 8
- In office December 1, 2010 – September 5, 2012
- Preceded by: Oliver Carroll
- Succeeded by: Garry Tanuan

Personal details
- Born: Tobias Combalicer Enverga Jr. December 2, 1955 Lucena, Quezon, Philippines
- Died: November 16, 2017 (aged 61) Medellín, Colombia
- Party: Conservative
- Spouse: Rosemer Albovias
- Children: 3
- Education: Colegio de San Juan de Letran; York University; Centennial College

Tobias Combalicer Enverga Jr. (December 2, 1955 – November 16, 2017) was a Canadian senator representing the province of Ontario.

== Early life and career ==
Enverga was born in the Philippines. He earned a Bachelor of Arts in Economics from the Colegio de San Juan de Letran in the Philippines, a Masters Certificate in Project Management from the Schulich School of Business at York University, and a Computer Studies Certificate from Centennial College. At the time of his appointment, he was a project manager at the Bank of Montreal, where he had worked for over 30 years.

=== School trustee ===
He served as a school trustee on the Toronto Catholic District School Board until his appointment to the Senate and was the first Filipino-Canadian elected to public office in the city of Toronto. As a trustee, Enverga initiated Rosary Day in October where all Catholic school communities would pray the Rosary.

=== Community Involvement ===
He was co-chair of the Asian Heritage Month Celebration for the Greater Toronto Area, and was previously a director of the Canadian Multicultural Council-Asians in Ontario. He founded the Philippine Canadian Charitable Foundation and was past president of the Philippine Independence Day Council.

Enverga also supported charitable organizations such as ANCOP Canada, Kol Hope Foundation for Children, where he was a member of the board and the Community Alliance for Social Justice (CASJ), a broad alliance of individuals and groups fighting for justice and the marginalized. Senator Enverga was also integral in providing relief goods when Typhoon Haiyan (Yolanda) hit the Philippines.

== Senator ==
Enverga was appointed to the Senate of Canada on September 6, 2012, where he sat as a Conservative.

He was the first Filipino-Canadian to sit in the Senate. One of his primary focuses in the Senate was to advocate for people with Down syndrome, a condition affecting one of his daughters. Enverga was also a passionate champion of multiculturalism.

Enverga also initiated the first Philippine Flag-Raising event at Parliament Hill to mark Philippine Independence on June 12. The event attracted hundreds of attendees from all over Ontario and Quebec.

In addition, Senator Enverga was involved in several Standing Committees and participated in various important studies. He was involved in the Aboriginals Peoples committee, Banking, Trade and Commerce; Maritime Search and Rescue Operations, National Finance, National Security and Defense.

Senator Enverga also served as the only representative and led delegate from Canada at the 38th General Assembly of the ASEAN Inter-Parliamentary Assembly (AIPA) and held a dialogue with over various representatives from ASEAN countries to discuss topics including Canada's approach to disaster management, illegal drug policies, trade and investment, as well as other topics raised by his parliamentary counterparts.

He was a member of the Canadian delegation to the ParlAmericas. It is a group composed of 35 national legislatures from North America, Central and South America and the Caribbean. He played an active role in building ties with parliamentarians and civil society representatives from the regions through political dialogue and cooperation.

== Awards and recognitions ==
Enverga was an active member of the community and has been recognized for his contributions to both Canada and in the Philippines. He was the only individual among the four awardees who received the very prestigious 2008 Linkapil Award (or Lingkodsa Kapwa Pilipino Presidential Award). LINKAPIL Award is conferred on Filipino associations or individuals for their exceptional or significant contribution to reconstruction, progress and development in the Philippines. In 2012, he received the Queen's Diamond Jubilee Medal for his exceptional and meritorious service.

Enverga was also conferred with the Philippine Order of the Knights of Rizal with the rank of Knight Grand Officer of Rizal-(KGOR).

== Death ==
He died November 16, 2017, while on a parliamentary trip to Medellín, Colombia to attend the ParlAmericas Annual Plenary Assembly.

== Electoral record ==
=== Municipal ===
2010 Toronto election Catholic District School Board; Trustee – Ward 8
Candidate	Votes	%
Tobias Enverga	2,596	22.04%
Carol Williams	2,560	21.73%
Tom De Luca	1,460	12.39%
Paul Del Grande	1,371	11.64%
Theresa Pastore	1,365	11.59%
Leo Ng	1,336	11.34%
Benedict Aguiar	1,091	9.26%
Total	12,652	100%
