= Fred Dickson =

Canadian politician

The Honourable Fred Dickson QC

Senator for Halifax, Nova Scotia
- In office January 2, 2009 – February 9, 2012
- Appointed by: Stephen Harper

Personal details
- Born: July 4, 1937 Glace Bay, Nova Scotia, Canada
- Died: February 9, 2012 (aged 74) Truro, Nova Scotia, Canada
- Party: Conservative
- Spouse: Kaye Dickson
- Committees: Senate Committee on National Finance and Senate Committee on Energy, the Environment and Natural Resources

Fred Dickson QC (July 4, 1937 – February 9, 2012) was a Canadian lawyer, politician, and a Conservative member of the Senate of Canada. Dickson was appointed on the advice of Stephen Harper to the Senate on January 2, 2009.

== Career ==
He was counsel with the law firm of McInnes Cooper and has advised the federal and provincial governments on numerous resource and infrastructure projects, including serving as an advisor to the Government of Nova Scotia under Premier John Buchanan during the signing of the 1982 and 1985 Canada/Nova Scotia Offshore Oil and Gas Agreements. He was a director of the Offshore/Onshore Technologies Association of Nova Scotia and Canadian Council for Public-Private Partnerships.

He died on February 9, 2012, after a four-year battle with colon cancer.
