= Asha Seth =

Canadian politician and doctor

The Honourable Asha Seth
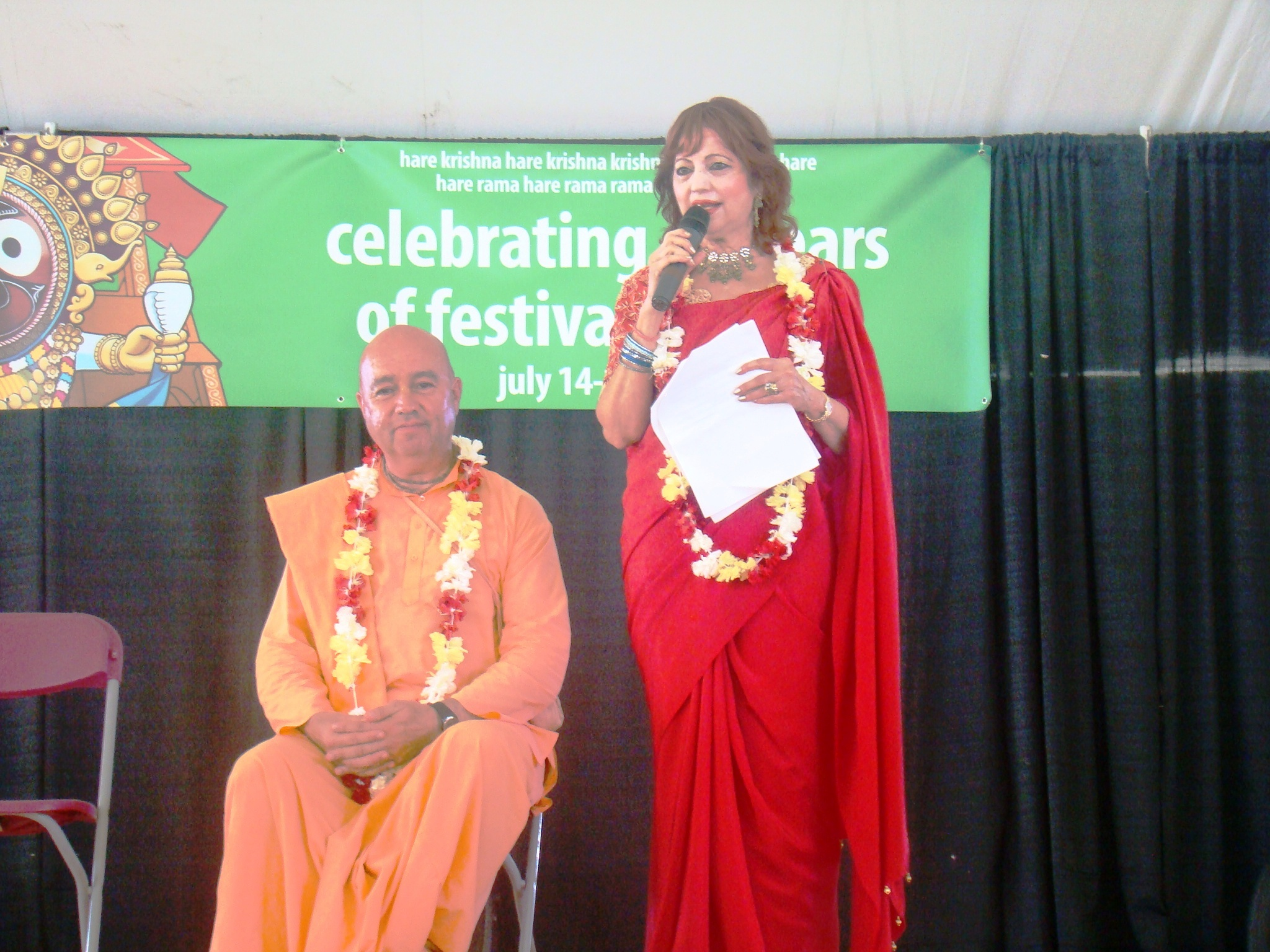
- Sr. Swamiji of ISCON honored Dr. Asha Seth

Canadian Senator from Ontario
- In office January 6, 2012 – December 15, 2014
- Appointed by: Stephen Harper

Personal details
- Born: December 15, 1939 (age 86)
- Party: Conservative
- Education: King George Medical College

Asha Seth (born December 15, 1939) is a Canadian politician and physician. She was appointed to the Senate of Canada (for Ontario) by Stephen Harper on January 6, 2012, and sat as a Conservative until reaching the mandatory retirement age of 75 on December 15, 2014.

== Background ==
She was born in India and trained in medicine at the King George Medical College in Lucknow and the Royal Berkshire Hospital in the UK. She became a Canadian citizen in 1974. She worked as an obstetrician and gynecologist at St. Joseph's Health Centre in Toronto since 1976, and is also known as a philanthropist, having founded the NIMDAC Foundation. She is a National Board member of the Canadian National Institute for the Blind. She is part of the executive team of the Canada India Foundation.

In 2010, Seth was one of the recipients of the Top 25 Canadian Immigrant Awards, presented by Canadian Immigrant Magazine.
