= JoAnne Buth =

Canadian politician

The Honourable JoAnne L. Buth

Canadian Senator from Manitoba
- In office January 6, 2012 – August 10, 2014
- Nominated by: Stephen Harper
- Appointed by: David Johnston
- Preceded by: Sharon Carstairs
- Succeeded by: Patricia Bovey

Personal details
- Born: May 23, 1954 (age 72)
- Party: Conservative
- Education: University of Winnipeg (BSc); University of Manitoba (MSc)

JoAnne L. Buth (born May 23, 1954) is a retired Canadian politician. She was appointed to the Canadian Senate by Governor General David Johnston on the advice of Prime Minister Stephen Harper on January 6, 2012, replacing the retired Sharon Carstairs. She sat as a Conservative. She retired from the Senate on August 10, 2014 in order to become CEO of the Canadian International Grains Institute, a group that promotes Canadian field crops.

== Early life and education ==
Buth was born May 21, 1954. She has a Bachelor of Science in biology from the University of Winnipeg and a Master of Science in entomology from the University of Manitoba.

== Career ==
Buth's background in agriculture includes stints as a research and development manager with DowElanco Canada and as an information officer for the federal agriculture department's research station in Winnipeg. More recently she worked in Carman, Manitoba as a manager and weed management specialist in Manitoba's provincial ministry of agriculture. Prior to her Senate appointment, she was president of the Canola Council of Canada, a lobby group for the canola industry.
