= List of senators in the 37th Parliament of Canada =

This is a list of members of the Senate of Canada in the 37th Parliament of Canada.

The province of Quebec has 24 Senate divisions which are constitutionally mandated. In all other provinces, a Senate division is strictly an optional designation of the senator's own choosing, and has no real constitutional or legal standing. A senator who does not choose a special senate division is designated a senator for the province at large.

Names in bold indicate senators in the 26th or 27th Canadian Ministry.

== List of senators ==
=== Senators at the beginning of the 37th Parliament ===
Name	Party	Province (Division)	Date appointed	Appointed by	Left office	Reason
Willie Adams	Liberal	Nunavut	April 5, 1977	Trudeau	June 22, 2009	Retirement
Raynell Andreychuk	Progressive Conservative	Saskatchewan	March 11, 1993	Mulroney	August 14, 2019	Retirement
W. David Angus	Progressive Conservative	Quebec (Alma)	June 10, 1993	Mulroney	July 21, 2012	Retirement
Norman Atkins	Progressive Conservative	Ontario (Markham)	June 30, 1986	Mulroney	June 27, 2009	Retirement
**Jack Austin**	**Liberal**	**British Columbia (Vancouver South)**	**August 19, 1975**	**Trudeau**	**March 2, 2007**	**Retirement**
Lise Bacon	Liberal	Quebec (De la Durantaye)	September 15, 1994	Chrétien	August 25, 2009	Retirement
Tommy Banks	Liberal	Alberta	April 7, 2000	Chrétien	December 17, 2011	Retirement
Gérald Beaudoin	Progressive Conservative	Quebec (Rigaud)	September 26, 1988	Mulroney	April 15, 2004	Retirement
Eric Berntson	Progressive Conservative	Saskatchewan	September 27, 1990	Mulroney	February 27, 2001	Resignation
Roch Bolduc	Progressive Conservative	Quebec (Gulf)	September 26, 1988	Mulroney	September 10, 2003	Retirement
John G. Bryden	Liberal	New Brunswick	November 23, 1994	Chrétien	October 31, 2009	Resignation
John Buchanan	Progressive Conservative	Nova Scotia (Halifax)	September 12, 1990	Mulroney	April 22, 2006	Retirement
Catherine Callbeck	Liberal	Prince Edward Island	September 22, 1997	Chrétien	July 25, 2014	Retirement
Pat Carney	Progressive Conservative	British Columbia	August 30, 1990	Mulroney	January 31, 2008	Resignation
**Sharon Carstairs**	**Liberal**	**Manitoba**	**September 15, 1994**	**Chrétien**	**October 17, 2011**	**Resignation**
Thelma Chalifoux	Liberal	Alberta	November 26, 1997	Chrétien	February 8, 2004	Retirement
Marie Charette-Poulin	Liberal	Ontario (Northern Ontario)	September 21, 1995	Chrétien	April 17, 2015	Resignation
Ione Christensen	Liberal	Yukon	September 2, 1999	Chrétien	December 31, 2006	Resignation
Ethel Cochrane	Progressive Conservative	Newfoundland and Labrador	November 17, 1986	Mulroney	September 23, 2012	Retirement
Erminie Cohen	Progressive Conservative	New Brunswick (Saint John)	June 4, 1993	Mulroney	July 23, 2001	Retirement
Gerald Comeau	Progressive Conservative	Nova Scotia	August 30, 1990	Mulroney	November 30, 2013	Resignation
Joan Cook	Liberal	Newfoundland and Labrador	March 6, 1998	Chrétien	October 6, 2009	Retirement
Anne Cools	Liberal	Ontario (Toronto Centre)	January 13, 1984	Trudeau	August 12, 2018	Retirement
Eymard Corbin	Liberal	New Brunswick (Grand-Sault)	July 9, 1984	Turner	August 2, 2009	Retirement
Jane Cordy	Liberal	Nova Scotia	June 9, 2000	Chrétien	November 18, 2024	Resignation
Pierre de Bané	Liberal	Quebec (De la Vallière)	June 29, 1984	Trudeau	August 2, 2013	Retirement
Mabel DeWare	Progressive Conservative	New Brunswick (Moncton)	September 23, 1990	Mulroney	August 9, 2001	Retirement
Consiglio Di Nino	Progressive Conservative	Ontario	August 30, 1990	Mulroney	June 30, 2012	Resignation
C. William Doody	Progressive Conservative	Newfoundland and Labrador (Harbour Main-Bell Island)	October 3, 1979	Clark	December 27, 2005	Death
Trevor Eyton	Progressive Conservative	Ontario	September 23, 1990	Mulroney	July 12, 2009	Retirement
Joyce Fairbairn	Liberal	Alberta (Lethbridge)	June 29, 1984	Trudeau	January 18, 2013	Resignation
Marisa Ferretti Barth	Liberal	Quebec (Repentigny)	September 22, 1997	Chrétien	April 28, 2006	Retirement
Sheila Finestone	Liberal	Quebec (Montarville)	August 11, 1999	Chrétien	January 28, 2002	Retirement
Isobel Finnerty	Liberal	Ontario	September 2, 1999	Chrétien	July 15, 2005	Retirement
Ross Fitzpatrick	Liberal	British Columbia (Okanagan-Similkameen)	March 6, 1998	Chrétien	February 4, 2008	Retirement
Michael Forrestall	Progressive Conservative	Nova Scotia (Dartmouth/Eastern Shore)	September 27, 1990	Mulroney	June 8, 2006	Death
Joan Fraser	Liberal	Quebec (De Lorimier)	September 17, 1998	Chrétien	February 2, 2018	Resignation
George Furey	Liberal	Newfoundland and Labrador	August 11, 1999	Chrétien	May 12, 2023	Retirement
Jean-Robert Gauthier	Liberal	Ontario (Ottawa—Vanier)	November 23, 1994	Chrétien	October 22, 2004	Retirement
Aurélien Gill	Liberal	Quebec (Wellington)	September 17, 1998	Chrétien	August 26, 2008	Retirement
Jerry Grafstein	Liberal	Ontario (Metro Toronto)	January 13, 1984	Trudeau	January 2, 2010	Retirement
Alasdair Graham	Liberal	Nova Scotia (The Highlands)	April 27, 1972	Trudeau	May 21, 2004	Retirement
Lenard Gustafson	Progressive Conservative	Saskatchewan	May 26, 1993	Mulroney	November 10, 2008	Retirement
Dan Hays	Liberal	Alberta (Calgary)	June 29, 1984	Trudeau	June 30, 2007	Resignation
Céline Hervieux-Payette	Liberal	Quebec (Bedford)	March 21, 1995	Chrétien	April 22, 2016	Retirement
Janis Johnson	Progressive Conservative	Manitoba	September 27, 1990	Mulroney	September 27, 2016	Resignation
Serge Joyal	Liberal	Quebec (Kennebec)	November 26, 1997	Chrétien	January 31, 2020	Retirement
James Kelleher	Progressive Conservative	Ontario	September 23, 1990	Mulroney	October 2, 2005	Retirement
Betty Kennedy	Liberal	Ontario	June 20, 2000	Chrétien	January 4, 2001	Retirement
Colin Kenny	Liberal	Ontario (Rideau)	June 29, 1984	Trudeau	February 2, 2018	Resignation
Wilbert Keon	Progressive Conservative	Ontario (Ottawa)	September 27, 1990	Mulroney	May 17, 2010	Retirement
Noël Kinsella	Progressive Conservative	New Brunswick (Fredericton—York—Sunbury)	September 12, 1990	Mulroney	November 27, 2014	Retirement
Michael J. L. Kirby	Liberal	Nova Scotia (South Shore)	January 13, 1984	Trudeau	October 31, 2006	Resignation
Leo Kolber	Liberal	Quebec (Victoria)	December 23, 1983	Trudeau	January 18, 2004	Retirement
Richard Kroft	Liberal	Manitoba	June 11, 1998	Chrétien	September 24, 2004	Resignation
Thérèse Lavoie-Roux	Progressive Conservative	Quebec (Acadie)	September 27, 1990	Mulroney	March 12, 2001	Resignation
Edward M. Lawson	Independent	British Columbia (Vancouver)	October 7, 1970	Trudeau	September 24, 2004	Retirement
Marjory LeBreton	Progressive Conservative	Ontario	June 18, 1993	Mulroney	July 4, 2015	Retirement
Rose-Marie Losier-Cool	Liberal	New Brunswick (Tracadie)	March 21, 1995	Chrétien	June 18, 2012	Retirement
John Lynch-Staunton	Progressive Conservative	Quebec (Grandville)	September 23, 1990	Mulroney	June 19, 2005	Retirement
Shirley Maheu	Liberal	Quebec (Rougemont)	February 1, 1996	Chrétien	February 1, 2006	Death
Frank Mahovlich	Liberal	Ontario (Toronto)	June 11, 1998	Chrétien	January 10, 2013	Retirement
Michael Meighen	Progressive Conservative	Ontario (St. Marys)	September 27, 1990	Mulroney	February 6, 2012	Resignation
Léonce Mercier	Liberal	Quebec (Mille Isles)	August 9, 1996	Chrétien	August 11, 2001	Retirement
Lorna Milne	Liberal	Ontario (Brampton & Peel County)	September 21, 1995	Chrétien	December 13, 2009	Retirement
Gildas Molgat	Liberal	Manitoba (Ste. Rose)	October 7, 1970	Trudeau	February 28, 2001	Death
Wilfred Moore	Liberal	Nova Scotia (Stanhope St./South Shore)	September 26, 1996	Chrétien	January 14, 2017	Retirement
Lowell Murray	Progressive Conservative	Ontario (Pakenham)	September 13, 1979	Clark	September 26, 2011	Retirement
Pierre Claude Nolin	Progressive Conservative	Quebec (De Salaberry)	June 18, 1993	Mulroney	April 23, 2015	Death
Donald Oliver	Progressive Conservative	Nova Scotia (South Shore)	September 7, 1990	Mulroney	November 16, 2013	Retirement
Landon Pearson	Liberal	Ontario	September 15, 1994	Chrétien	November 16, 2005	Retirement
Lucie Pépin	Liberal	Quebec (Shawinigan)	April 8, 1997	Chrétien	September 7, 2011	Retirement
Ray Perrault	Liberal	British Columbia (North Shore-Burnaby)	October 5, 1973	Trudeau	February 6, 2001	Retirement
Michael Pitfield	Independent	Ontario (Ottawa—Vanier)	December 22, 1982	Trudeau	June 1, 2010	Resignation
Vivienne Poy	Liberal	Ontario (Toronto)	September 17, 1998	Chrétien	September 17, 2012	Resignation
Marcel Prud'homme	Independent	Quebec (La Salle)	May 26, 1993	Mulroney	November 30, 2009	Retirement
Jean-Claude Rivest	Progressive Conservative	Quebec (Stadacona)	March 11, 1993	Mulroney	January 31, 2015	Resignation
Brenda Robertson	Progressive Conservative	New Brunswick (Riverview)	December 21, 1984	Mulroney	May 23, 2004	Retirement
Fernand Robichaud	Liberal	New Brunswick	September 22, 1997	Chrétien	December 2, 2014	Retirement
Douglas Roche	Independent	Alberta (Edmonton)	September 17, 1998	Chrétien	June 14, 2004	Retirement
Bill Rompkey	Liberal	Newfoundland and Labrador	September 21, 1995	Chrétien	May 13, 2011	Retirement
Eileen Rossiter	Progressive Conservative	Prince Edward Island	November 17, 1986	Mulroney	July 14, 2004	Retirement
Raymond Setlakwe	Liberal	Quebec (The Laurentides)	June 20, 2000	Chrétien	July 3, 2003	Retirement
Nick Sibbeston	Liberal	Northwest Territories	September 2, 1999	Chrétien	November 21, 2017	Resignation
Jean-Maurice Simard	Progressive Conservative	New Brunswick (Edmundston)	June 26, 1985	Mulroney	June 16, 2001	Death
Herbert O. Sparrow	Liberal	Saskatchewan	February 9, 1968	Pearson	January 4, 2005	Retirement
Mira Spivak	Progressive Conservative	Manitoba	November 17, 1986	Mulroney	July 12, 2009	Retirement
Raymond Squires	Liberal	Newfoundland and Labrador	June 9, 2000	Chrétien	February 6, 2001	Retirement
Gerry St. Germain	Canadian Alliance	British Columbia (Langley-Pemberton-Whistler)	June 23, 1993	Mulroney	November 6, 2012	Retirement
Peter Stollery	Liberal	Ontario (Bloor and Yonge (Toronto))	July 2, 1981	Trudeau	November 29, 2010	Retirement
Terry Stratton	Progressive Conservative	Manitoba (Red River)	March 25, 1993	Mulroney	March 16, 2013	Retirement
Nicholas Taylor	Liberal	Alberta (Bon Accord & Sturgeon County)	March 7, 1996	Chrétien	November 17, 2002	Retirement
David Tkachuk	Progressive Conservative	Saskatchewan	June 8, 1993	Mulroney	February 18, 2020	Retirement
Charlie Watt	Liberal	Quebec (Inkerman)	January 16, 1984	Trudeau	March 16, 2018	Resignation
Jack Wiebe	Liberal	Saskatchewan	April 7, 2000	Chrétien	January 31, 2004	Resignation
Lois Miriam Wilson	Independent	Ontario (Toronto)	June 11, 1998	Chrétien	April 8, 2002	Retirement

=== Senators appointed during the 37th Parliament ===
Name	Party	Province (Division)	Date appointed	Appointed by	Left office	Reason
Libbe Hubley	Liberal	Prince Edward Island	March 8, 2001	Chrétien	September 8, 2017	Retirement
Yves Morin	Liberal	Quebec (Lauzon)	March 8, 2001	Chrétien	November 28, 2004	Retirement
James Tunney	Liberal	Ontario (Grafton)	March 8, 2001	Chrétien	June 16, 2002	Retirement
Mobina Jaffer	Liberal	British Columbia	June 13, 2001	Chrétien	Incumbent	
Laurier LaPierre	Liberal	Ontario	June 13, 2001	Chrétien	November 21, 2004	Retirement
Viola Léger	Liberal	New Brunswick (Acadie)	June 13, 2001	Chrétien	June 29, 2005	Retirement
Jean Lapointe	Liberal	Quebec (Saurel)	June 13, 2001	Chrétien	December 6, 2010	Retirement
Joseph A. Day	Liberal	New Brunswick (Saint John-Kennebecasis)	October 4, 2001	Chrétien	Incumbent	
Michel Biron	Liberal	Quebec (Mille Isles)	October 4, 2001	Chrétien	March 16, 2009	Retirement
Gerard Phalen	Liberal	Nova Scotia	October 4, 2001	Chrétien	March 28, 2009	Retirement
Ron Duhamel	Liberal	Manitoba	January 15, 2002	Chrétien	September 30, 2002	Death
George Baker	Liberal	Newfoundland and Labrador	March 26, 2002	Chrétien	September 4, 2017	Retirement
Raymond Lavigne	Liberal	Quebec (Montarville)	March 26, 2002	Chrétien	March 21, 2011	Resignation
David Smith	Liberal	Ontario (Cobourg)	June 25, 2002	Chrétien	May 16, 2016	Retirement
Pana Merchant	Liberal	Saskatchewan	December 12, 2002	Chrétien	March 31, 2017	Resignation
Maria Chaput	Liberal	Manitoba	December 12, 2002	Chrétien	March 1, 2016	Resignation
Pierrette Ringuette	Liberal	New Brunswick	December 12, 2002	Chrétien	Incumbent	
Percy Downe	Liberal	Prince Edward Island (Charlottetown)	June 26, 2003	Chrétien	Incumbent	
Paul Massicotte	Liberal	Quebec (De Lanaudière)	June 26, 2003	Chrétien	Incumbent	
Marilyn Trenholme Counsell	Liberal	New Brunswick	September 9, 2003	Chrétien	October 22, 2008	Retirement
Madeleine Plamondon	Independent	Quebec (The Laurentides)	September 9, 2003	Chrétien	September 21, 2006	Retirement
Mac Harb	Liberal	Ontario	September 9, 2003	Chrétien	August 26, 2013	Resignation
Terry Mercer	Liberal	Nova Scotia (North End Halifax)	November 7, 2003	Chrétien	May 6, 2022	Retirement
Jim Munson	Liberal	Ontario (Ottawa/Rideau Canal)	December 10, 2003	Chrétien	Incumbent	

=== Left Senate during the 37th Parliament ===
Date	Name	Party	Representing	Details
January 4, 2001	Betty Kennedy	Liberal	Ontario	Retirement
February 6, 2001	Raymond Squires	Liberal	Newfoundland and Labrador	Retirement
February 6, 2001	Ray Perrault	Liberal	British Columbia (North Shore-Burnaby)	Retirement
February 27, 2001	Eric Berntson	Progressive Conservative	Saskatchewan	Resignation
February 28, 2001	Gildas Molgat	Liberal	Manitoba (Ste. Rose)	Death
March 12, 2001	Thérèse Lavoie-Roux	Progressive Conservative	Quebec (Acadie)	Resignation
June 16, 2001	Jean-Maurice Simard	Progressive Conservative	New Brunswick (Edmundston)	Death
July 23, 2001	Erminie Cohen	Progressive Conservative	New Brunswick (Saint John)	Retirement
August 9, 2001	Mabel DeWare	Progressive Conservative	New Brunswick (Moncton)	Retirement
August 11, 2001	Léonce Mercier	Liberal	Quebec (Mille Isles)	Retirement
January 28, 2002	Sheila Finestone	Liberal	Quebec (Montarville)	Retirement
April 8, 2002	Lois Miriam Wilson	Independent	Ontario (Toronto)	Retirement
June 16, 2002	James Tunney	Liberal	Ontario (Grafton)	Retirement
September 30, 2002	Ron Duhamel	Liberal	Manitoba	Death
November 17, 2002	Nicholas Taylor	Liberal	Alberta (Bon Accord & Sturgeon County)	Retirement
July 3, 2003	Raymond Setlakwe	Liberal	Quebec (The Laurentides)	Retirement
September 10, 2003	Roch Bolduc	Progressive Conservative	Quebec (Gulf)	Retirement
January 18, 2004	Leo Kolber	Liberal	Quebec (Victoria)	Retirement
January 31, 2004	Jack Wiebe	Liberal	Saskatchewan	Resignation
February 8, 2004	Thelma Chalifoux	Liberal	Alberta	Retirement
April 15, 2004	Gérald Beaudoin	Conservative	Quebec (Rigaud)	Retirement
May 21, 2004	Alasdair Graham	Liberal	Nova Scotia (The Highlands)	Retirement
May 23, 2004	Brenda Robertson	Conservative	New Brunswick	Retirement
June 14, 2004	Douglas Roche	Independent	Alberta (Edmonton)	Retirement

=== Changes in party affiliation during the 37th Parliament ===
Date	Name	Party (subsequent)	Party (previous)	Details
February 2, 2004	Janis Johnson	Conservative	Progressive Conservative	Joined the new Conservative Party formed from the merger between the Progressive Conservatives and Canadian Alliance.
February 2, 2004	W. David Angus	Conservative	Progressive Conservative	Joined the new Conservative Party formed from the merger between the Progressive Conservatives and Canadian Alliance.
February 2, 2004	David Tkachuk	Conservative	Progressive Conservative	Joined the new Conservative Party formed from the merger between the Progressive Conservatives and Canadian Alliance.
February 2, 2004	Pierre Claude Nolin	Conservative	Progressive Conservative	Joined the new Conservative Party formed from the merger between the Progressive Conservatives and Canadian Alliance.
February 2, 2004	Pat Carney	Conservative	Progressive Conservative	Joined the new Conservative Party formed from the merger between the Progressive Conservatives and Canadian Alliance.
February 2, 2004	Noël Kinsella	Conservative	Progressive Conservative	Joined the new Conservative Party formed from the merger between the Progressive Conservatives and Canadian Alliance.
February 2, 2004	Trevor Eyton	Conservative	Progressive Conservative	Joined the new Conservative Party formed from the merger between the Progressive Conservatives and Canadian Alliance.
February 2, 2004	Consiglio Di Nino	Conservative	Progressive Conservative	Joined the new Conservative Party formed from the merger between the Progressive Conservatives and Canadian Alliance.
February 2, 2004	Gerry St. Germain	Conservative	Canadian Alliance	Joined the new Conservative Party formed from the merger between the Progressive Conservatives and Canadian Alliance.
February 2, 2004	Eileen Rossiter	Conservative	Progressive Conservative	Joined the new Conservative Party formed from the merger between the Progressive Conservatives and Canadian Alliance.
February 2, 2004	Michael Forrestall	Conservative	Progressive Conservative	Joined the new Conservative Party formed from the merger between the Progressive Conservatives and Canadian Alliance.
February 2, 2004	Brenda Robertson	Conservative	Progressive Conservative	Joined the new Conservative Party formed from the merger between the Progressive Conservatives and Canadian Alliance.
February 2, 2004	Marjory LeBreton	Conservative	Progressive Conservative	Joined the new Conservative Party formed from the merger between the Progressive Conservatives and Canadian Alliance.
February 2, 2004	Gerald Comeau	Conservative	Progressive Conservative	Joined the new Conservative Party formed from the merger between the Progressive Conservatives and Canadian Alliance.
February 2, 2004	Gérald Beaudoin	Conservative	Progressive Conservative	Joined the new Conservative Party formed from the merger between the Progressive Conservatives and Canadian Alliance.
February 2, 2004	Lenard Gustafson	Conservative	Progressive Conservative	Joined the new Conservative Party formed from the merger between the Progressive Conservatives and Canadian Alliance.
February 2, 2004	Mira Spivak	Conservative	Progressive Conservative	Joined the new Conservative Party formed from the merger between the Progressive Conservatives and Canadian Alliance.
February 2, 2004	James Kelleher	Conservative	Progressive Conservative	Joined the new Conservative Party formed from the merger between the Progressive Conservatives and Canadian Alliance.
February 2, 2004	Ethel Cochrane	Conservative	Progressive Conservative	Joined the new Conservative Party formed from the merger between the Progressive Conservatives and Canadian Alliance.
February 2, 2004	John Lynch-Staunton	Conservative	Progressive Conservative	Joined the new Conservative Party formed from the merger between the Progressive Conservatives and Canadian Alliance.
February 2, 2004	Michael Meighen	Conservative	Progressive Conservative	Joined the new Conservative Party formed from the merger between the Progressive Conservatives and Canadian Alliance.
February 2, 2004	Terry Stratton	Conservative	Progressive Conservative	Joined the new Conservative Party formed from the merger between the Progressive Conservatives and Canadian Alliance.
February 2, 2004	Donald Oliver	Conservative	Progressive Conservative	Joined the new Conservative Party formed from the merger between the Progressive Conservatives and Canadian Alliance.
February 2, 2004	John Buchanan	Conservative	Progressive Conservative	Joined the new Conservative Party formed from the merger between the Progressive Conservatives and Canadian Alliance.
February 2, 2004	Wilbert Keon	Conservative	Progressive Conservative	Joined the new Conservative Party formed from the merger between the Progressive Conservatives and Canadian Alliance.
February 2, 2004	Raynell Andreychuk	Conservative	Progressive Conservative	Joined the new Conservative Party formed from the merger between the Progressive Conservatives and Canadian Alliance.
February 3, 2004	Mira Spivak	Independent	Conservative	Chose to sit as an independent after originally joining the new Conservative Party.
February 4, 2004	Edward M. Lawson	Liberal	Independent	
June 2, 2004	Jean-Claude Rivest	Independent	Progressive Conservative	
June 8, 2004	Anne Cools	Conservative	Liberal	

== See also ==
- List of current Canadian senators
