= An Act to amend the Criminal Code (hate propaganda) =

Act of the Parliament of Canada

Parliament of Canada
- Citation: SC 2004, c. 14
- Passed by: House of Commons
- Passed: September 17, 2003
- Passed by: Senate
- Passed: April 28, 2004
- Royal assent: April 29, 2004
- Commenced: April 29, 2004

Legislative history

Initiating chamber: House of Commons
- Bill citation: Bill C-415, 37th Parliament, 1st Session; Bill C-250, 37th Parliament, 2nd and 3rd Sessions
- Introduced by: Svend Robinson
- First reading: November 22, 2001
- Second reading: October 24, 2002
- Considered in committee: May 27, 2003
- Third reading: September 17, 2003

Revising chamber: Senate
- Member(s) in charge: Serge Joyal
- First reading: February 3, 2004
- Second reading: February 5, 2004
- Considered in committee: March 25, 2004
- Third reading: April 28, 2004

Related legislation
- Criminal Code, RSC 1985, c. C-46

Summary
- Adds sexual orientation to offences of hate propaganda and advocating genocide
- Status: In force

An Act to amend the Criminal Code (hate propaganda), (French: Loi modifiant le Code criminel (propagande haineuse), also known as Bill C-250 during the second and third sessions of the 37th Canadian parliament) is an Act of the Parliament of Canada to amend the Criminal Code. It added penalties for publicly inciting hatred against or encouraging the genocide of people on the basis of sexual orientation and added a defence for the expression of good-faith opinions based on religious texts. It originated in a Private Member's Bill introduced by Svend Robinson, a member of the opposition.

== Content ==
Prior to this amendment, the Criminal Code prohibited the promotion of genocide and the public incitement of hatred against groups identifiable by colour, race, religion, and ethnic origin. The Act expanded coverage of these existing provisions to include groups identifiable on the basis of sexual orientation. The Act also expanded one of the defences available to persons charged with the incitement of hatred, allowing for the expression of good-faith opinions based on religious texts, in addition to the preexisting defence allowing the good-faith expression of opinions on religious subjects.

As with all Canadian legislation, this act has equal force in French in which it is called La Loi modifiant le Code criminel (propagande haineuse).

== Religious freedom concerns ==
Critics of the bill claimed that it would prohibit reciting various scripture condemning homosexuality, while supporters pointed out that the bill added an explicit defence against any charge of incitement of hatred for opinions expressed in good faith based on religious texts. Critics of the law however, have expressed concern the courts will abrogate the religious loophole because "good faith" is not clearly defined.

== Legislative history ==
C-250 was first introduced in 2001 into the 37th Parliament, 1st Session as Bill C-415 by New Democratic MP Svend Robinson. Following the end of that session, the bill was reintroduced as C-250 in the 37th Parliament, 2nd Session. It passed the House of Commons on September 17, 2003, but was not passed by the Senate before the end of the session. The bill was reintroduced in the 37th Parliament, 3rd Session, passing both the Senate on April 28, 2004. Royal Assent was granted on April 29, 2004.

September 17, 2003 vote in the House of Commons of Canada (3rd Reading)
| Party | Voted for | Voted against | Present (Speaker of the House) | Absent (Did Not Vote) |
|---|---|---|---|---|
| G Liberal Party of Canada (Parti libéral du Canada) (Grits) | 92: Peter Adams; Reg Alcock; Jean Augustine; Larry Bagnell; Sue Barnes; Gilbert Barrette; Mauril Bélanger; Carolyn Bennett; Gérard Binet; Ethel Blondin-Andrew; Paul Bonwick; Don Boudria; Claudette Bradshaw; Bonnie Brown; Sarmite Bulte; Gerry Byrne; Charles Caccia; Elinor Caplan; Aileen Carroll; Marlene Catterall; Martin Cauchon; Yvon Charbonneau; Denis Coderre; David Collenette; Roy Cullen; Rodger Cuzner; Paul DeVillers; Stéphane Dion; Stan Dromisky; Claude Drouin; Wayne Easter; Art Eggleton; Mark Eyking; John Finlay; Raymonde Folco; Joe Fontana; Liza Frulla; Hedy Fry; John Godfrey; Bill Graham; Ivan Grose; Albina Guarnieri; John Harvard; André Harvey; Tony Ianno; Marlene Jennings; Christian Jobin; Joe Jordan; Stan Keyes; David Kilgour; Gar Knutson; Karen Kraft Sloan; Robert Lanctôt; Dominic LeBlanc; Derek Lee; Clifford Lincoln; Paul Harold Macklin; Steve Mahoney; John Maloney; Paul Martin; John McCallum; Anne McLellan; Maria Minna; Andy Mitchell; Shawn Murphy; Robert Nault; Anita Neville; Gilbert Normand; Denis Paradis; Carolyn Parrish; Bernard Patry; Jim Peterson; Beth Phinney; David Price; Marcel Proulx; Karen Redman; Geoff Regan; Lucienne Robillard; Allan Rock; Jacques Saada; Andy Scott; Judy Sgro; Alex Shepherd; Raymond Simard; Brent St. Denis; Jane Stewart; Diane St-Jacques; Andrew Telegdi; Robert Thibault; Yolande Thibeault; Lyle Vanclief; Susan Whelan | 41: Sarkis Assadourian; Réginald Bélair; Eugène Bellemare; Robert Bertrand; Raymond Bonin; John Bryden; Murray Calder; John Cannis; Brenda Chamberlain; John Efford; Charles Hubbard; Ovid Jackson; Nancy Karetak-Lindell; Jim Karygiannis; Walt Lastewka; Judi Longfield; Gurbax Malhi; Diane Marleau; Larry McCormick; Joe McGuire; John McKay; Dan McTeague; Pat O'Brien; John O'Reilly; Massimo Pacetti; Janko Peric; Joe Peschisolido; Jerry Pickard; Gary Pillitteri; Julian Reed; Andy Savoy; Benoît Serré; Bob Speller; Paul Steckle; Guy St-Julien; Paul Szabo; Alan Tonks; Rose-Marie Ur; Tony Valeri; Joseph Volpe; Tom Wappel | 1: Peter Milliken | 37: Carole-Marie Allard; David Anderson; Mark Assad; Eleni Bakopanos; Colleen Beaumier; Maurizio Bevilacqua; Jeannot Castonguay; Jean Chrétien; Joe Comuzzi; Sheila Copps (Paired); Irwin Cotler; Herb Dhaliwal (Paired); Nick Discepola; Claude Duplain; Georges Farrah; Roger Gallaway; Ralph Goodale (Paired); Bob Kilger; Rick Laliberte; Sophia Leung; Lawrence MacAulay; John Manley; Serge Marcil; Bill Matthews; Peter Milliken; Dennis Mills; Lynn Myers; Lawrence D. O'Brien; Stephen Owen (Paired); Rey Pagtakhan; Pierre Pettigrew (Paired); David Pratt; Carmen Provenzano; Hélène Scherrer; Tony Tirabassi; Paddy Torsney; Bryon Wilfert |
| Canadian Alliance (Alliance canadienne) | - | 62: Jim Abbott; Diane Ablonczy; Rob Anders; David Anderson; Roy Bailey; Leon Benoit; Garry Breitkreuz; Andy Burton; Chuck Cadman; Rick Casson; David Chatters; John Cummins; Stockwell Day; John Duncan; Reed Elley; Ken Epp; Brian Fitzpatrick; Paul Forseth; Cheryl Gallant; Peter Goldring; Jim Gouk; Gurmant Grewal; Deborah Grey; Art Hanger; Stephen Harper; Richard Harris; Grant Hill; Jay Hill; Howard Hilstrom; Betty Hinton; Rahim Jaffer; Dale Johnston; Jason Kenney; Gary Lunn; James Lunney; Keith Martin; Philip Mayfield; Grant McNally; Val Meredith; Rob Merrifield; Bob Mills; Deepak Obhrai; Brian Pallister; Charlie Penson; James Rajotte; Scott Reid; John Reynolds; Gerry Ritz; Werner Schmidt; Carol Skelton; Monte Solberg; Kevin Sorenson; Larry Spencer; Darrel Stinson; Chuck Strahl; Myron Thompson; Vic Toews; Maurice Vellacott; Randy White; Ted White; John G. Williams; Lynne Yelich | - | 1: James Moore |
| Bloc Québécois (BQ) | 27: Gérard Asselin; Claude Bachand; Stéphane Bergeron; Bernard Bigras; Diane Bourgeois; Serge Cardin; Paul Crête; Madeleine Dalphond-Guiral; Gilles Duceppe; Marcel Gagnon; Christiane Gagnon; Sébastien Gagnon; Michel Gauthier; Jocelyne Girard-Bujold; Monique Guay; Michel Guimond; Mario Laframboise; Yvan Loubier; Richard Marceau; Réal Ménard; Pierre Paquette; Pauline Picard; Louis Plamondon; Yves Rocheleau; Jean-Yves Roy; Benoît Sauvageau; Suzanne Tremblay | - | - | 6: Odina Desrochers (Paired); Ghislain Fournier (Paired); Roger Gaudet (Paired); Francine Lalonde (Paired); Gilles-A. Perron; Caroline St-Hilaire (Paired) |
| New Democratic Party (Nouveau Parti démocratique) (NDP) | 14: Bill Blaikie; Joe Comartin; Libby Davies; Bev Desjarlais; Yvon Godin; Wendy Lill; Pat Martin; Brian Masse; Alexa McDonough; Lorne Nystrom; Dick Proctor; Svend Robinson; Peter Stoffer; Judy Wasylycia-Leis | - | - | - |
| Progressive Conservative Party of Canada (Parti progressiste-conservateur du Canada) (PC) | 7: André Bachand; Rick Borotsik; Scott Brison; Joe Clark; John Herron; Gerald Keddy; Peter MacKay | 7: Rex Barnes; Bill Casey; Norman E. Doyle; Inky Mark; Gary Schellenberger; Greg Thompson; Elsie Wayne | - | 1: Loyola Hearn |
| Independent | 1: Jean-Guy Carignan | - | - | 3: Ghislain Lebel; Jim Pankiw; Pierrette Venne |
| Total | 141 | 110 | 1 | 48 (5 Pairs) |

April 28, 2004 vote in the Senate of Canada (3rd Reading)
| Party | Voted for | Voted against | Abstained | Present (Speaker of the Senate) (chose not to vote) | Absent (Did Not Vote) |
|---|---|---|---|---|---|
| G Liberal Party of Canada (Parti libéral du Canada) (Grits) | 49: Willie Adams; Jack Austin; Lise Bacon; Tommy Banks; Michel Biron; John G. Bryden; Catherine Callbeck; Sharon Carstairs; Maria Chaput; Ione Christensen; Joan Cook; Eymard Corbin; Joseph A. Day; Percy Downe; Joyce Fairbairn; Marisa Ferretti Barth; Isobel Finnerty; Ross Fitzpatrick; Joan Fraser; George Furey; Jean-Robert Gauthier; Aurélien Gill; Alasdair Graham; Mac Harb; Céline Hervieux-Payette; Libbe Hubley; Mobina Jaffer; Serge Joyal; Colin Kenny; Michael J. L. Kirby; Richard Kroft; Jean Lapointe; Raymond Lavigne; Viola Léger; Rose-Marie Losier-Cool; Shirley Maheu; Frank Mahovlich; Paul Massicotte; Terry Mercer; Yves Morin; Jim Munson; Landon Pearson; Gerard Phalen; Pierrette Ringuette; Fernand Robichaud; Bill Rompkey; David Smith; Peter Stollery; Charlie Watt | 3: Anne Cools; Pana Merchant; Nick Sibbeston | - | 1: Lucie Pépin (Speaker pro-tempore) | 12: George Baker; Marie Charette-Poulin; Jane Cordy; Marilyn Trenholme Counsell; Pierre De Bané; Jerry Grafstein; Daniel Hays; Laurier LaPierre; Lorna Milne; Wilfred Moore; Vivienne Poy; Herbert O. Sparrow |
| Conservative Party of Canada (Parti conservateur du Canada) (Tories) | 5: Raynell Andreychuk; Janis Johnson; Marjory LeBreton; Pierre Claude Nolin; Jean-Claude Rivest | 6: W. David Angus; Ethel Cochrane; Michael Forrestall; Gerry St. Germain; Terry Stratton; David Tkachuk | 3: James Kelleher; John Lynch-Staunton; Michael Meighen | - | 11: John Buchanan; Pat Carney; Gerald Comeau; Consiglio Di Nino; Trevor Eyton; Lenard Gustafson; Wilbert Keon; Noël Kinsella; Donald Oliver; Brenda Robertson; Eileen Rossiter |
| Independent | 2: Marcel Prud'homme; Mira Spivak^{a} | 2: Edward M. Lawson; Madeleine Plamondon | - | - | 2: Michael Pitfield; Douglas Roche |
| Progressive Conservative Party of Canada (Parti progressiste-conservateur du Canada) (PC)^{a} | 3: Norman K. Atkins; C. William Doody; Lowell Murray | - | - | - | - |
| Total | 59 | 11 | 3 | 1 | 25 |

a. These senators have decided against joining the Conservative Party of Canada and have chosen to sit in the Senate as 'Progressive Conservatives' (with Mira Spivak briefly joining the Conservative caucus before becoming an Independent).
