= Marjory LeBreton =

Canadian politician (born 1940)

The Honourable Marjory LeBreton PC
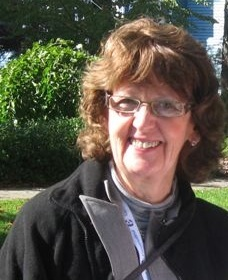

Leader of the Government in the Senate
- In office February 6, 2006 – July 14, 2013
- Prime Minister: Stephen Harper
- Deputy: Gerald Comeau; Claude Carignan
- Whip: Terry Stratton; Consiglio Di Nino; Elizabeth Marshall
- Preceded by: Jack Austin
- Succeeded by: Claude Carignan

Minister of State (Seniors) (Note: Office known as "Secretary of State for Seniors" from January 4, 2007 to October 30, 2008.)
- In office January 4, 2007 – January 4, 2011
- Prime Minister: Stephen Harper
- Minister: Monte Solberg; Diane Finley
- Preceded by: Position established
- Succeeded by: Diane Ablonczy

Canadian Senator from Ontario
- In office June 18, 1993 – July 4, 2015
- Nominated by: Brian Mulroney
- Appointed by: Ray Hnatyshyn
- Preceded by: Multi-member district
- Succeeded by: Multi-member district

Personal details
- Born: July 4, 1940 (age 86) Nepean, Ontario, Canada
- Party: Conservative
- Spouse: Douglas LeBreton (1934-2022)
- Profession: Political advisor

Marjory LeBreton PC (born July 4, 1940) is a Canadian former leader of the Government in the Senate of Canada; a member of the Canadian cabinet; and past national chair of Mothers Against Drunk Driving in Canada. She worked with four leaders of the Progressive Conservative Party of Canada - John Diefenbaker, Robert Stanfield, Joe Clark and Brian Mulroney - from 1962 to 1993 before being appointed to the Senate on the advice of Mulroney. She sat as a Progressive Conservative Senator from her appointment until moving with most of her caucus colleagues to the new Conservative Party of Canada in 2004, of which she was soon elected to Chief Whip. She served as an advisor to then opposition leader Stephen Harper during the 2006 election, which the Conservative Party won. After the election, she was named to the cabinet position Leader of the Government in the Senate. On July 4, 2013, LeBreton announced she would not continue in the position as of the next cabinet shuffle, which occurred later that summer. She retired from the Senate upon reaching her 75th birthday on July 4, 2015.

== Early and personal life ==
Marjory LeBreton was born in and completed her elementary and secondary school education in the neighbourhood of City View, in the city of Nepean, Ontario, which is today part of Ottawa. She was married to Douglas LeBreton (1934–2022), with whom she had two children: Linda and Michael. Linda was killed in an accident involving a drunk driver which led to LeBreton's active involvement in the Mothers Against Drunk Driving organization.

== Progressive Conservative staffer ==
LeBreton began working at Progressive Conservative party headquarters in 1962, moving from there to the office of leader John Diefenbaker when he became opposition leader following the 1963 election. During her time in the leader's office, she accompanied him on a national whistlestop tour during the 1965 election.

Following Diefenbaker's resignation as leader, she continued in the leader's office under Robert Stanfield through his three election campaigns - 1968, 1972 and 1974. When Stanfield announced his resignation in 1975, she went to work in the PC Party office helping to coordinate the 1976 Progressive Conservative leadership convention. Joe Clark won the 1976 convention and hired LeBreton as his office's tour coordinator, a position she held until Clark won the 1979 federal election.

LeBreton later worked in the office of Brian Mulroney while he was prime minister, rising to position of Deputy Chief of Staff and Government Appointments Director. She was appointed by Mulroney to the Senate on June 18, 1993, shortly before his retirement from politics.

== Senator ==
LeBreton is generally considered to be a Red Tory and is progressive on social issues such as abortion rights. She was also one of the few politicians in the Parliament of Canada to oppose Bill C-36, Canada's anti-terrorism legislation in 2001.

She was a long-time foe of proposals to merge the Progressive Conservatives with the Canadian Alliance but reluctantly supported the late 2003 proposal to unite the parties and subsequently became a Conservative Party of Canada senator once the merger was completed. Over time, she warmed to the new party, and later served as one of Stephen Harper's top advisors in the 2006 federal election.

Senator LeBreton was appointed Leader of the Government in the Senate by Prime Minister Stephen Harper in February 2006 and also acquired the role of Secretary of State for Seniors during a cabinet shuffle on January 4, 2007. On July 4, 2013, she announced her resignation from the cabinet after a stormy period of expenses scandals that tarnished the reputation of the Conservatives, but remained a Conservative Senator for Ontario. Senator LeBreton was an important figure during the Canadian Senate expenses scandal, having ordered the initial audit by Deloitte of senatorial expenses, after accusations of misappropriation were levelled against Canadian senators, most famously Mike Duffy, whose name became synonymous with the scandal. While she received a backlash for her role as the government leader at the time of the misappropriations, she was adamant that an investigation needed to proceed. Criticism was levelled at her from both party critics and loyalists, with the former claiming she was involved in a whitewash, and the latter claiming she was underhandedly promoting controversial Senate reform. As the scandals intensified, LeBreton gave a defiant speech to the Senate in which she said Ottawa was "populated by Liberal elites and their media lickspittles". LeBreton was well known for her campaign work where her job was to "assist the media."

=== Committee assignments ===
Following her appointment to the Senate, during the 34th Canadian Parliament, she sat on the Standing Committee on Internal Economy, Budgets and Administration.

During the 35th Parliament, she sat on the Internal Economy Committee, Standing Committee on Social Affairs, Science and Technology, Standing Committee on Agriculture and Forestry, as well as the Special Committee on Pearson Airport Agreements.

In the 36th Parliament, she sat on the Internal Economy committee, Social Affairs committee, Agriculture and Forestry committee, Standing Committee on Transport and Communications, Standing Committee on Banking, Trade and Commerce, as well as the Special Committee on Security and Intelligence.

In the 37th Parliament, she sat on the Social Affairs committee, the Agriculture and Forestry committee, the Transport and Communications committee, the Standing Committee on Privileges, Standing Rules and Orders, and the Standing Committee on National Finance.

In the 38th Parliament, she sat on the Social Affairs committee, the Transport and Communications committee, the Standing Committee on Rules, Procedures and the Rights of Parliament, the Standing Committee on Human Rights, and the Standing Committee on Foreign Affairs.

In the 39th Parliament, she sat on the Social Affairs committee, the Rules committee, the Human Rights committee and the Foreign Affairs committee.

During the 37th, 38th and 39th parliaments, she was vice-chair of the Social Affairs committee. During the 40th Parliament, as government leader, she did not sit formally on any committee, but was an ex-officio member of them all.

== See also ==
- List of Ontario senators

28th Canadian Ministry (2006–2015) – Cabinet of Stephen Harper
Cabinet post (1)
Predecessor	Office	Successor
Jack Austin	Leader of the Government in the Senate; February 6, 2006 – July 15, 2013	Cabinet position abolished
Sub-Cabinet Post
Predecessor	Title	Successor
	Minister of State for Seniors (2007–2010) styled as Secretary of State until 2008	Diane Ablonczy
