= List of House members of the 37th Parliament of Canada =

The following is a list of the members as of the dissolution of the 37th Parliament of Canada on May 23, 2004, and reflects additions to the House resulting from by-election and resignations following the 2000 election.

== Members ==
Key:

- Party leaders are italicized.
- Cabinet ministers are in **boldface**.
- The prime minister is **both**.
- The speaker is indicated by "†".
- Parliamentary secretaries are indicated by "‡".

=== Alberta ===
Name	Party	Electoral district	First elected / previously elected	No. of terms
David Chatters	Canadian Alliance	Athabasca	1993	3rd term
David Chatters	Conservative	Athabasca	1993	3rd term
Joe Clark (Note: Progressive Conservative leader until May 31, 2003.)	Progressive Conservative	Calgary Centre	1972, (Note: Rocky Mountain/Yellowhead) 2000	8th time*
Joe Clark	Independent	Calgary Centre	1972, 2000	8th time*
Deepak Obhrai	Canadian Alliance	Calgary East	1997	2nd term
Deepak Obhrai	Conservative	Calgary East	1997	2nd term
Art Hanger	Canadian Alliance	Calgary Northeast	1993	3rd term
Art Hanger	Independent Canadian Alliance	Calgary Northeast	1993	3rd term
Art Hanger	Democratic Representative	Calgary Northeast	1993	3rd term
Art Hanger	Canadian Alliance	Calgary Northeast	1993	3rd term
Art Hanger	Conservative	Calgary Northeast	1993	3rd term
Diane Ablonczy	Canadian Alliance	Calgary—Nose Hill	1993	3rd term
Diane Ablonczy	Conservative	Calgary—Nose Hill	1993	3rd term
Jason Kenney	Canadian Alliance	Calgary Southeast	1997	2nd term
Jason Kenney	Conservative	Calgary Southeast	1997	2nd term
Preston Manning	Canadian Alliance	Calgary Southwest	1993	3rd term
Stephen Harper (2002) (Note: Canadian Alliance leader from March 20, 2002, to December 7, 2003. Conservative leader from March 20, 2004.)	Canadian Alliance	Calgary Southwest	1993, (Note: Calgary West) 2002	2nd term*
Stephen Harper (2002)	Conservative	Calgary Southwest	1993, 2002	2nd term*
Rob Anders	Canadian Alliance	Calgary West	1997	2nd term
Rob Anders	Conservative	Calgary West	1997	2nd term
Kevin Sorenson	Canadian Alliance	Crowfoot	2000	1st term
Kevin Sorenson	Conservative	Crowfoot	2000	1st term
Peter Goldring	Canadian Alliance	Edmonton Centre-East	1997	2nd term
Peter Goldring	Conservative	Edmonton Centre-East	1997	2nd term
Deborah Grey	Canadian Alliance	Edmonton North	1989	4th term
Deborah Grey	Independent Canadian Alliance	Edmonton North	1989	4th term
Deborah Grey	Democratic Representative	Edmonton North	1989	4th term
Deborah Grey	Canadian Alliance	Edmonton North	1989	4th term
Deborah Grey	Conservative	Edmonton North	1989	4th term
Rahim Jaffer	Canadian Alliance	Edmonton—Strathcona	1997	2nd term
Rahim Jaffer	Conservative	Edmonton—Strathcona	1997	2nd term
**David Kilgour**	Liberal	Edmonton Southeast	1979 (Note: First elected as a Progressive Conservative)	7th term
James Rajotte	Canadian Alliance	Edmonton Southwest	2000	1st term
James Rajotte	Conservative	Edmonton Southwest	2000	1st term
**Anne McLellan**	Liberal	Edmonton West	1993	3rd term
Ken Epp	Canadian Alliance	Elk Island	1993	3rd term
Ken Epp	Conservative	Elk Island	1993	3rd term
Leon Benoit	Canadian Alliance	Lakeland	1993	3rd term
Leon Benoit	Conservative	Lakeland	1993	3rd term
Rick Casson	Canadian Alliance	Lethbridge	1997	2nd term
Rick Casson	Conservative	Lethbridge	1997	2nd term
Grant Hill	Canadian Alliance	Macleod	1993	3rd term
Grant Hill	Conservative	Macleod	1993	3rd term
Monte Solberg	Canadian Alliance	Medicine Hat	1993	3rd term
Monte Solberg	Independent Canadian Alliance	Medicine Hat	1993	3rd term
Monte Solberg	Democratic Representative	Medicine Hat	1993	3rd term
Monte Solberg	Canadian Alliance	Medicine Hat	1993	3rd term
Monte Solberg	Conservative	Medicine Hat	1993	3rd term
Charlie Penson	Canadian Alliance	Peace River	1993	3rd term
Charlie Penson	Conservative	Peace River	1993	3rd term
Bob Mills	Canadian Alliance	Red Deer	1993	3rd term
Bob Mills	Conservative	Red Deer	1993	3rd term
John Williams	Canadian Alliance	St. Albert	1993	3rd term
John Williams	Conservative	St. Albert	1993	3rd term
Dale Johnston	Canadian Alliance	Wetaskiwin	1993	3rd term
Dale Johnston	Conservative	Wetaskiwin	1993	3rd term
Myron Thompson	Canadian Alliance	Wild Rose	1993	3rd term
Myron Thompson	Conservative	Wild Rose	1993	3rd term
Rob Merrifield	Canadian Alliance	Yellowhead	2000	1st term
Rob Merrifield	Conservative	Yellowhead	2000	1st term

=== British Columbia ===
Name	Party	Electoral district	First elected / previously elected	No. of terms
Svend Robinson	NDP	Burnaby—Douglas	1979	7th term
Philip Mayfield	Canadian Alliance	Cariboo—Chilcotin	1993	3rd term
Philip Mayfield	Conservative	Cariboo—Chilcotin	1993	3rd term
John Cummins	Canadian Alliance	Delta—South Richmond	1993	3rd term
John Cummins	Conservative	Delta—South Richmond	1993	3rd term
Grant McNally	Canadian Alliance	Dewdney—Alouette	1997	2nd term
Grant McNally	Independent Canadian Alliance	Dewdney—Alouette	1997	2nd term
Grant McNally	Democratic Representative	Dewdney—Alouette	1997	2nd term
Grant McNally	Canadian Alliance	Dewdney—Alouette	1997	2nd term
Grant McNally	Conservative	Dewdney—Alouette	1997	2nd term
Keith Martin	Canadian Alliance	Esquimalt—Juan de Fuca	1993	3rd term
Keith Martin	Conservative	Esquimalt—Juan de Fuca	1993	3rd term
Keith Martin	Independent	Esquimalt—Juan de Fuca	1993	3rd term
Chuck Strahl	Canadian Alliance	Fraser Valley	1993	3rd term
Chuck Strahl	Independent Canadian Alliance	Fraser Valley	1993	3rd term
Chuck Strahl	Democratic Representative	Fraser Valley	1993	3rd term
Chuck Strahl	Canadian Alliance	Fraser Valley	1993	3rd term
Chuck Strahl	Conservative	Fraser Valley	1993	3rd term
Betty Hinton	Canadian Alliance	Kamloops, Thompson and Highland Valleys	2000	1st term
Betty Hinton	Conservative	Kamloops, Thompson and Highland Valleys	2000	1st term
Werner Schmidt	Canadian Alliance	Kelowna	1993	3rd term
Werner Schmidt	Conservative	Kelowna	1993	3rd term
Jim Gouk	Canadian Alliance	Kootenay—Boundary—Okanagan	1993	3rd term
Jim Gouk	Independent Canadian Alliance	Kootenay—Boundary—Okanagan	1993	3rd term
Jim Gouk	Democratic Representative	Kootenay—Boundary—Okanagan	1993	3rd term
Jim Gouk	Canadian Alliance	Kootenay—Boundary—Okanagan	1993	3rd term
Jim Gouk	Conservative	Kootenay—Boundary—Okanagan	1993	3rd term
Jim Abbott	Canadian Alliance	Kootenay—Columbia	1993	3rd term
Jim Abbott	Conservative	Kootenay—Columbia	1993	3rd term
Randy White	Canadian Alliance	Langley—Abbotsford	1993	3rd term
Randy White	Conservative	Langley—Abbotsford	1993	3rd term
James Lunney	Canadian Alliance	Nanaimo—Alberni	2000	1st term
James Lunney	Conservative	Nanaimo—Alberni	2000	1st term
Reed Elley	Canadian Alliance	Nanaimo—Cowichan	1997	2nd term
Reed Elley	Conservative	Nanaimo—Cowichan	1997	2nd term
Paul Forseth	Canadian Alliance	New Westminster—Coquitlam—Burnaby	1993	3rd term
Paul Forseth	Conservative	New Westminster—Coquitlam—Burnaby	1993	3rd term
Ted White	Canadian Alliance	North Vancouver	1993	3rd term
Ted White	Conservative	North Vancouver	1993	3rd term
Stockwell Day (Note: Canadian Alliance leader until December 12, 2001.)	Canadian Alliance	Okanagan—Coquihalla	2000	2nd term
Stockwell Day	Conservative	Okanagan—Coquihalla	2000	2nd term
Darrel Stinson	Canadian Alliance	Okanagan—Shuswap	1993	3rd term
Darrel Stinson	Conservative	Okanagan—Shuswap	1993	3rd term
James Moore	Canadian Alliance	Port Moody—Coquitlam—Port Coquitlam	2000	1st term
James Moore	Conservative	Port Moody—Coquitlam—Port Coquitlam	2000	1st term
Richard Harris	Canadian Alliance	Prince George–Bulkley Valley	1993	3rd term
Richard Harris	Conservative	Prince George–Bulkley Valley	1993	3rd term
Jay Hill	Canadian Alliance	Prince George—Peace River	1993	3rd term
Jay Hill	Independent Canadian Alliance	Prince George—Peace River	1993	3rd term
Jay Hill	Democratic Representative	Prince George—Peace River	1993	3rd term
Jay Hill	Canadian Alliance	Prince George—Peace River	1993	3rd term
Jay Hill	Conservative	Prince George—Peace River	1993	3rd term
Joe Peschisolido ‡	Canadian Alliance	Richmond	2000	1st term
Joe Peschisolido ‡	Liberal	Richmond	2000	1st term
Gary Lunn	Canadian Alliance	Saanich—Gulf Islands	1997	2nd term
Gary Lunn	Independent Canadian Alliance	Saanich—Gulf Islands	1997	2nd term
Gary Lunn	Democratic Representative	Saanich—Gulf Islands	1997	2nd term
Gary Lunn	Canadian Alliance	Saanich—Gulf Islands	1997	2nd term
Gary Lunn	Conservative	Saanich—Gulf Islands	1997	2nd term
Andy Burton	Canadian Alliance	Skeena	2000	1st term
Andy Burton	Independent Canadian Alliance	Skeena	2000	1st term
Andy Burton	Democratic Representative	Skeena	2000	1st term
Andy Burton	Canadian Alliance	Skeena	2000	1st term
Andy Burton	Conservative	Skeena	2000	1st term
Val Meredith	Canadian Alliance	South Surrey—White Rock—Langley	1993	3rd term
Val Meredith	Independent Canadian Alliance	South Surrey—White Rock—Langley	1993	3rd term
Val Meredith	Democratic Representative	South Surrey—White Rock—Langley	1993	3rd term
Val Meredith	Canadian Alliance	South Surrey—White Rock—Langley	1993	3rd term
Val Meredith	Conservative	South Surrey—White Rock—Langley	1993	3rd term
Gurmant Grewal	Canadian Alliance	Surrey Central	1997	2nd term
Gurmant Grewal	Conservative	Surrey Central	1997	2nd term
Chuck Cadman	Canadian Alliance	Surrey North	1997	2nd term
Chuck Cadman	Conservative	Surrey North	1997	2nd term
Chuck Cadman	Independent	Surrey North	1997	2nd term
**Hedy Fry** ‡	Liberal	Vancouver Centre	1993	3rd term
Libby Davies	NDP	Vancouver East	1997	2nd term
John Duncan	Canadian Alliance	Vancouver Island North	1993	3rd term
John Duncan	Conservative	Vancouver Island North	1993	3rd term
Sophia Leung ‡	Liberal	Vancouver Kingsway	1997	2nd term
**Stephen Owen** ‡	Liberal	Vancouver Quadra	2000	1st term
**Herb Dhaliwal**	Liberal	Vancouver South—Burnaby	1993	3rd term
**David Anderson**	Liberal	Victoria	1968, (Note: Esquimalt—Saanich) 1993	4th term*
John Reynolds (Note: Canadian Alliance interim leader from December 12, 2001, to March 20, 2002.)	Canadian Alliance	West Vancouver—Sunshine Coast	1972, (Note: Burnaby—Richmond—Delta (First elected as a Progressive Conservative)) 1997	4th term*
John Reynolds	Conservative	West Vancouver—Sunshine Coast	1972, 1997	4th term*

=== Manitoba ===
Name	Party	Electoral district	First elected / previously elected	No. of terms
Rick Borotsik	Progressive Conservative	Brandon—Souris	1997	2nd term
Rick Borotsik	Conservative	Brandon—Souris	1997	2nd term
John Harvard ‡	Liberal	Charleswood St. James—Assiniboia	1988	4th term
Vacant		Charleswood St. James—Assiniboia	1988	4th term
Bev Desjarlais	NDP	Churchill	1997	2nd term
Inky Mark	Canadian Alliance	Dauphin—Swan River	1997	2nd term
Inky Mark	Independent Canadian Alliance	Dauphin—Swan River	1997	2nd term
Inky Mark	Democratic Representative	Dauphin—Swan River	1997	2nd term
Inky Mark	Independent Conservative	Dauphin—Swan River	1997	2nd term
Inky Mark	Progressive Conservative	Dauphin—Swan River	1997	2nd term
Inky Mark	Conservative	Dauphin—Swan River	1997	2nd term
Vic Toews	Canadian Alliance	Provencher	2000	1st term
Vic Toews	Conservative	Provencher	2000	1st term
Brian Pallister	Canadian Alliance	Portage—Lisgar	2000	1st term
Brian Pallister	Conservative	Portage—Lisgar	2000	1st term
**Ron Duhamel**	Liberal	Saint Boniface	1988	4th term
Raymond Simard (2002)	Liberal	Saint Boniface	2002	1st term
Howard Hilstrom	Canadian Alliance	Selkirk—Interlake	1997	2nd term
Howard Hilstrom	Conservative	Selkirk—Interlake	1997	2nd term
Pat Martin	NDP	Winnipeg Centre	1997	2nd term
Judy Wasylycia-Leis	NDP	Winnipeg North Centre	1997	2nd term
**Rey Pagtakhan**	Liberal	Winnipeg North—St. Paul	1988	4th term
**Reg Alcock**	Liberal	Winnipeg South	1993	3rd term
Anita Neville	Liberal	Winnipeg South Centre	2000	1st term
Bill Blaikie	NDP	Winnipeg—Transcona	1979	7th term

=== New Brunswick ===
Name	Party	Electoral district	First elected / previously elected	No. of terms
Yvon Godin	NDP	Acadie—Bathurst	1997	2nd term
Dominic LeBlanc ‡	Liberal	Beauséjour—Petitcodiac	2000	1st term
**Andy Scott**	Liberal	Fredericton	1993	3rd term
John Herron	Progressive Conservative	Fundy—Royal	1997	2nd term
John Herron	Independent	Fundy—Royal	1997	2nd term
Jeannot Castonguay ‡	Liberal	Madawaska—Restigouche	2000	1st term
Charles Hubbard ‡	Liberal	Miramichi	1993	3rd term
**Claudette Bradshaw**	Liberal	Moncton—Riverview—Dieppe	1997	2nd term
Greg Thompson	Progressive Conservative	New Brunswick Southwest	1988, 1997	3rd term*
Greg Thompson	Conservative	New Brunswick Southwest	1988, 1997	3rd term*
Elsie Wayne	Progressive Conservative	Saint John	1993	3rd term
Elsie Wayne	Conservative	Saint John	1993	3rd term
Andy Savoy	Liberal	Tobique—Mactaquac	2000	1st term

=== Newfoundland and Labrador ===
Name	Party	Electoral district	First elected / previously elected	No. of terms
**Brian Tobin**	Liberal	Bonavista—Trinity—Conception	1980, (Note: Humber—Port au Port—St. Barbe/Humber—St. Barbe—Baie Verte) 2000	5th term*
**John Efford** (2002)	Liberal	Bonavista—Trinity—Conception	2002	1st term
Bill Matthews ‡	Liberal	Burin—St. George's	1997	2nd term
George Baker	Liberal	Gander—Grand-Falls	1974	8th time
Rex Barnes (2002)	Progressive Conservative	Gander—Grand-Falls	2002	1st term
Rex Barnes (2002)	Conservative	Gander—Grand-Falls	2002	1st term
**Gerry Byrne** ‡	Liberal	Humber—St. Barbe—Baie Verte	1996	3rd term
Lawrence D. O'Brien ‡	Liberal	Labrador	1996	3rd term
Norman Doyle	Progressive Conservative	St. John's East	1997	2nd term
Norman Doyle	Conservative	St. John's East	1997	2nd term
Loyola Hearn	Progressive Conservative	St. John's West	2000	2nd term
Loyola Hearn	Conservative	St. John's West	2000	2nd term

=== Nova Scotia ===
Name	Party	Electoral district	First elected / previously elected	No. of terms
Rodger Cuzner ‡	Liberal	Bras d'Or—Cape Breton	2000	1st term
Bill Casey	Progressive Conservative	Cumberland—Colchester	1988, 1997	3rd term*
Bill Casey	Conservative	Cumberland—Colchester	1988, 1997	3rd term*
Wendy Lill	NDP	Dartmouth	1997	2nd term
Alexa McDonough (Note: NDP leader until January 25, 2003.)	NDP	Halifax	1997	2nd term
**Geoff Regan** ‡	Liberal	Halifax West	1993, 2000	2nd term*
Scott Brison ‡	Progressive Conservative	Kings—Hants	1997, 2000	2nd term*
Scott Brison ‡	Liberal	Kings—Hants	1997, 2000	2nd term*
Peter MacKay (Note: Progressive Conservative leader from May 31, 2003, to December 8, 2003.)	Progressive Conservative	Pictou—Antigonish—Guysborough	1997	2nd term
Peter MacKay	Conservative	Pictou—Antigonish—Guysborough	1997	2nd term
Peter Stoffer	NDP	Sackville—Musquodoboit Valley—Eastern Shore	1997	2nd term
Gerald Keddy	Progressive Conservative	South Shore	1997	2nd term
Gerald Keddy	Conservative	South Shore	1997	2nd term
Mark Eyking ‡	Liberal	Sydney—Victoria	2000	1st term
**Robert Thibault**	Liberal	West Nova	2000	1st term

=== Ontario ===
Name	Party	Electoral district	First elected / previously elected	No. of terms
Brent St. Denis ‡	Liberal	Algoma—Manitoulin	1993	3rd term
John Bryden	Liberal	Ancaster—Dundas—Flamborough—Aldershot	1993	3rd term
John Bryden	Independent	Ancaster—Dundas—Flamborough—Aldershot	1993	3rd term
John Bryden	Conservative	Ancaster—Dundas—Flamborough—Aldershot	1993	3rd term
**Aileen Carroll** ‡	Liberal	Barrie—Simcoe—Bradford	1997	2nd term
**Maria Minna**	Liberal	Beaches—East York	1993	3rd term
Gurbax Malhi ‡	Liberal	Bramalea—Gore—Malton—Springdale	1993	3rd term
Sarkis Assadourian ‡	Liberal	Brampton Centre	1993	3rd term
Colleen Beaumier ‡	Liberal	Brampton West—Mississauga	1993	3rd term
**Jane Stewart**	Liberal	Brant	1993	3rd term
Ovid Jackson	Liberal	Bruce—Grey—Owen Sound	1993	3rd term
Paddy Torsney	Liberal	Burlington	1993	3rd term
Janko Peric	Liberal	Cambridge	1993	3rd term
Jerry Pickard ‡	Liberal	Chatham-Kent—Essex	1988	4th term
Charles Caccia	Liberal	Davenport	1968	10th term
**David Collenette**	Liberal	Don Valley East	1974, 1980, 1993	5th term*
John Godfrey ‡	Liberal	Don Valley West	1993	3rd term
Murray Calder ‡	Liberal	Dufferin—Peel—Wellington—Grey	1993	3rd term
Alex Shepherd ‡	Liberal	Durham	1993	3rd term
**Joe Volpe**	Liberal	Eglinton—Lawrence	1988	4th term
**Gar Knutson**	Liberal	Elgin—Middlesex—London	1993	3rd term
John Maloney ‡	Liberal	Erie—Lincoln	1993	3rd term
**Susan Whelan**	Liberal	Essex	1993	3rd term
**Allan Rock**	Liberal	Etobicoke Centre	1993	3rd term
Vacant		Etobicoke Centre	1993	3rd term
**Jean Augustine**	Liberal	Etobicoke—Lakeshore	1993	3rd term
Roy Cullen ‡	Liberal	Etobicoke North	1996	3rd term
**Don Boudria**	Liberal	Glengarry—Prescott—Russell	1984	5th term
Brenda Chamberlain ‡	Liberal	Guelph—Wellington	1993	3rd term
**Bob Speller**	Liberal	Haldimand—Norfolk—Brant	1988	4th term
John O'Reilly ‡	Liberal	Haliburton—Victoria—Brock	1993	3rd term
Julian Reed	Liberal	Halton	1993	3rd term
**Sheila Copps**	Liberal	Hamilton East	1984	5th term
Beth Phinney	Liberal	Hamilton Mountain	1988	4th term
**Stan Keyes**	Liberal	Hamilton West	1988	4th term
Larry McCormick ‡	Liberal	Hastings—Frontenac—Lennox and Addington	1993	3rd term
Paul Steckle	Liberal	Huron—Bruce	1993	3rd term
Peter Milliken †	Liberal	Kingston and the Islands	1988	4th term
Karen Redman ‡	Liberal	Kitchener Centre	1997	2nd term
Andrew Telegdi ‡	Liberal	Kitchener—Waterloo	1993	3rd term
**Bob Nault**	Liberal	Kenora—Rainy River	1988	4th term
Rose-Marie Ur	Liberal	Lambton—Kent—Middlesex	1993	3rd term
Scott Reid	Canadian Alliance	Lanark—Carleton	2000	1st term
Scott Reid	Conservative	Lanark—Carleton	2000	1st term
Joe Jordan ‡	Liberal	Leeds—Grenville	1997	2nd term
Pat O'Brien ‡	Liberal	London—Fanshawe	1993	3rd term
Joe Fontana ‡	Liberal	London North-Centre	1988	4th term
Sue Barnes ‡	Liberal	London West	1993	3rd term
**John McCallum** ‡	Liberal	Markham	2000	1st term
Carolyn Parrish	Liberal	Mississauga Centre	1993	3rd term
**Albina Guarnieri**	Liberal	Mississauga East	1988	4th term
Paul Szabo ‡	Liberal	Mississauga South	1993	3rd term
**Steve Mahoney** ‡	Liberal	Mississauga West	1997	2nd term
**David Pratt**	Liberal	Nepean—Carleton	1997	2nd term
Gary Pillitteri	Liberal	Niagara Falls	1993	3rd term
Tony Tirabassi ‡	Liberal	Niagara Centre	2000	1st term
Raymond Bonin	Liberal	Nickel Belt	1993	3rd term
Bob Wood	Liberal	Nipissing	1988	4th term
Paul Macklin ‡	Liberal	Northumberland	2000	1st term
Bryon Wilfert ‡	Liberal	Oak Ridges	1997	2nd term
Bonnie Brown	Liberal	Oakville	1993	3rd term
Ivan Grose ‡	Liberal	Oshawa	1993	3rd term
Mac Harb	Liberal	Ottawa Centre	1988	4th term
Vacant		Ottawa Centre	1988	4th term
Eugène Bellemare ‡	Liberal	Ottawa—Orléans	1988	4th term
**John Manley**	Liberal	Ottawa South	1988	4th term
**Mauril Bélanger**	Liberal	Ottawa—Vanier	1995	3rd term
Marlene Catterall	Liberal	Ottawa West—Nepean	1988	4th term
John Baird Finlay ‡	Liberal	Oxford	1993	3rd term
Sarmite Bulte ‡	Liberal	Parkdale—High Park	1997	2nd term
**Andy Mitchell**	Liberal	Parry Sound-Muskoka	1993	3rd term
John Richardson	Liberal	Perth—Middlesex	1993	3rd term
Gary Schellenberger (2003)	Progressive Conservative	Perth—Middlesex	2003	1st term
Gary Schellenberger (2003)	Conservative	Perth—Middlesex	2003	1st term
Peter Adams	Liberal	Peterborough	1993	3rd term
Dan McTeague ‡	Liberal	Pickering—Ajax—Uxbridge	1993	3rd term
**Lyle Vanclief**	Liberal	Prince Edward—Hastings	1988	4th term
Cheryl Gallant	Canadian Alliance	Renfrew—Nipissing—Pembroke	2000	1st term
Cheryl Gallant	Conservative	Renfrew—Nipissing—Pembroke	2000	1st term
Roger Gallaway ‡	Liberal	Sarnia—Lambton	1993	3rd term
Carmen Provenzano ‡	Liberal	Sault Ste. Marie	1997	2nd term
Jim Karygiannis ‡	Liberal	Scarborough—Agincourt	1988	4th term
John Cannis ‡	Liberal	Scarborough Centre	1993	3rd term
John McKay ‡	Liberal	Scarborough East	1997	2nd term
Derek Lee ‡	Liberal	Scarborough—Rouge River	1988	4th term
Tom Wappel	Liberal	Scarborough Southwest	1988	4th term
Paul Bonwick ‡	Liberal	Simcoe—Grey	1997	2nd term
**Paul DeVillers**	Liberal	Simcoe North	1993	3rd term
Walt Lastewka ‡	Liberal	St. Catharines	1993	3rd term
**Carolyn Bennett**	Liberal	St. Paul's	1997	2nd term
**Tony Valeri**	Liberal	Stoney Creek	1993	3rd term
Bob Kilger	Liberal	Stormont—Dundas—Charlottenburgh	1988	4th term
Diane Marleau	Liberal	Sudbury	1988	4th term
**Elinor Caplan**	Liberal	Thornhill	1997	2nd term
Stan Dromisky	Liberal	Thunder Bay—Atikokan	1993	3rd term
**Joe Comuzzi**	Liberal	Thunder Bay—Superior North	1988	4th term
Benoit Serré ‡	Liberal	Timiskaming—Cochrane	1993	3rd term
Réginald Bélair	Liberal	Timmins-James Bay	1988	4th term
**Bill Graham**	Liberal	Toronto Centre—Rosedale	1993	3rd term
Dennis Mills	Liberal	Toronto—Danforth	1988	4th term
Tony Ianno	Liberal	Trinity—Spadina	1993	3rd term
**Maurizio Bevilacqua**	Liberal	Vaughan—King—Aurora	1988	4th term
Lynn Myers ‡	Liberal	Waterloo—Wellington	1997	2nd term
Judi Longfield ‡	Liberal	Whitby—Ajax	1997	2nd term
**Jim Peterson**	Liberal	Willowdale	1980, 1988	5th term*
Joe Comartin	NDP	Windsor—St. Clair	2000	1st term
**Herb Gray**	Liberal	Windsor West	1962	13th time
Brian Masse (2002)	NDP	Windsor West	2002	1st term
**Art Eggleton**	Liberal	York Centre	1993	3rd term
Karen Kraft Sloan	Liberal	York North	1993	3rd term
Alan Tonks ‡	Liberal	York South—Weston	2000	1st term
**Judy Sgro** ‡	Liberal	York West	1999	2nd term

=== Prince Edward Island ===
Name	Party	Electoral district	First elected / previously elected	No. of terms
**Lawrence MacAulay**	Liberal	Cardigan	1988	4th term
**Joe McGuire**	Liberal	Egmont	1988	4th term
Shawn Murphy ‡	Liberal	Hillsborough	2000	1st term
**Wayne Easter**	Liberal	Malpeque	1993	3rd term

=== Quebec ===
Name	Party	Electoral district	First elected / previously elected	No. of terms
Guy St-Julien	Liberal	Abitibi—Baie-James—Nunavik	1984, 1997	4th term*
Eleni Bakopanos ‡	Liberal	Ahuntsic	1993	3rd term
Yvon Charbonneau ‡	Liberal	Anjou—Rivière-des-Prairies	1997	2nd term
Mario Laframboise	Bloc Québécois	Argenteuil—Papineau—Mirabel	2000	1st term
Louis Plamondon	Bloc Québécois	Bas-Richelieu—Nicolet—Bécancour	1984	5th term
**Claude Drouin** ‡	Liberal	Beauce	1997	2nd term
Serge Marcil ‡	Liberal	Beauharnois—Salaberry	2000	1st term
Michel Guimond	Bloc Québécois	Beauport—Montmorency—Côte-de-Beaupré—Île-d'Orléans	1993	3rd term
**Gilbert Normand**	Liberal	Bellechasse—Etchemins—Montmagny—L'Islet	1997	2nd term
Michel Bellehumeur	Bloc Québécois	Berthier—Montcalm	1993	3rd term
Roger Gaudet (2002)	Bloc Québécois	Berthier—Montcalm	2002	1st term
Georges Farrah ‡	Liberal	Bonaventure—Gaspé—Îles-de-la-Madeleine—Pabok	2000	1st term
**Denis Coderre**	Liberal	Bourassa	1997	2nd term
**Denis Paradis** ‡	Liberal	Brome—Missisquoi	1995	3rd term
**Jacques Saada**	Liberal	Brossard—La Prairie	1997	2nd term
Ghislain Lebel	Bloc Québécois	Chambly	1993	3rd term
Ghislain Lebel	Independent	Chambly	1993	3rd term
Marcel Gagnon	Bloc Québécois	Champlain	2000	1st term
Richard Marceau	Bloc Québécois	Charlesbourg—Jacques-Cartier	1997	2nd term
Gérard Asselin	Bloc Québécois	Charlevoix	1993	3rd term
Robert Lanctôt	Bloc Québécois	Châteauguay	2000	1st term
Robert Lanctôt	Liberal	Châteauguay	2000	1st term
André Harvey ‡	Liberal	Chicoutimi—Le Fjord	1984, 1997 (Note: re-elected as a Progressive Conservative)	4th term*
David Price ‡	Liberal	Compton—Stanstead	1997	2nd term
Pauline Picard	Bloc Québécois	Drummond	1993	3rd term
Gérard Binet	Liberal	Frontenac—Mégantic	2000	1st term
Mark Assad ‡	Liberal	Gatineau	1988	4th term
Réal Ménard	Bloc Québécois	Hochelaga—Maisonneuve	1993	3rd term
Marcel Proulx ‡	Liberal	Hull—Aylmer	1999	2nd term
Pierre Paquette	Bloc Québécois	Joliette	2000	1st term
Jocelyne Girard-Bujold	Bloc Québécois	Jonquière	1997	2nd term
Paul Crête	Bloc Québécois	Kamouraska—Rivière-du-Loup—Temiscouata—Les-Basques	1993	3rd term
Stéphan Tremblay	Bloc Québécois	Lac-Saint-Jean—Saguenay	1996	3rd term
Sébastien Gagnon (2002)	Bloc Québécois	Lac-Saint-Jean—Saguenay	2002	1st term
Clifford Lincoln	Liberal	Lac-Saint-Louis	1993	3rd term
**Paul Martin** (Note: Liberal leader from November 14, 2003. Prime minister from December 12, 2003.)	Liberal	LaSalle—Émard	1988	4th term
Monique Guay	Bloc Québécois	Laurentides	1993	3rd term
Gilles Duceppe	Bloc Québécois	Laurier—Sainte-Marie	1990	4th term
Madeleine Dalphond-Guiral	Bloc Québécois	Laval Centre	1993	3rd term
Carole-Marie Allard ‡	Liberal	Laval East	2000	1st term
Raymonde Folco ‡	Liberal	Laval West	1997	2nd term
Antoine Dubé	Bloc Québécois	Lévis-et-Chutes-de-la-Chaudière	1993	3rd term
Christian Jobin (2003)	Liberal	Lévis-et-Chutes-de-la-Chaudière	2003	1st term
Caroline St-Hilaire	Bloc Québécois	Longueuil	1997	2nd term
Odina Desrochers	Bloc Québécois	Lotbinière—L'Érable	1997	2nd term
**Hélène Scherrer**	Liberal	Louis-Hébert	2000	1st term
Ghislain Fournier	Bloc Québécois	Manicouagan	1997	2nd term
Jean-Yves Roy	Bloc Québécois	Matapédia—Matane	2000	1st term
Francine Lalonde	Bloc Québécois	Mercier	1993	3rd term
**Irwin Cotler**	Liberal	Mount Royal	1999	2nd term
Marlene Jennings ‡	Liberal	Notre-Dame-de-Grâce—Lachine	1997	2nd term
**Martin Cauchon**	Liberal	Outremont	1993	3rd term
**Pierre Pettigrew**	Liberal	Papineau—Saint-Denis	1996	3rd term
Bernard Patry	Liberal	Pierrefonds—Dollard	1993	3rd term
Robert Bertrand	Liberal	Pontiac—Gatineau—Labelle	1993	3rd term
Claude Duplain ‡	Liberal	Portneuf	2000	1st term
Christiane Gagnon	Bloc Québécois	Québec	1993	3rd term
Jean-Guy Carignan	Liberal	Quebec East	2000	1st term
Jean-Guy Carignan	Independent	Quebec East	2000	1st term
Jean-Guy Carignan	Liberal	Quebec East	2000	1st term
Jean-Guy Carignan	Independent	Quebec East	2000	1st term
Benoît Sauvageau	Bloc Québécois	Repentigny	1993	3rd term
André Bachand	Progressive Conservative	Richmond—Arthabaska	1997	2nd term
André Bachand	Independent	Richmond—Arthabaska	1997	2nd term
Suzanne Tremblay	Bloc Québécois	Rimouski—Neigette-et-La-Mitis	1993	3rd term
Gilles Perron	Bloc Québécois	Rivière-des-Mille-Îles	1997	2nd term
Michel Gauthier	Bloc Québécois	Roberval	1993	3rd term
Bernard Bigras	Bloc Québécois	Rosemont—La Petite-Patrie	1997	2nd term
Pierrette Venne	Bloc Québécois	Saint-Bruno—Saint-Hubert	1988	4th term
Pierrette Venne	Independent	Saint-Bruno—Saint-Hubert	1988	4th term
Yvan Loubier	Bloc Québécois	Saint-Hyacinthe—Bagot	1993	3rd term
Claude Bachand	Bloc Québécois	Saint-Jean	1993	3rd term
**Stéphane Dion**	Liberal	Saint-Laurent—Cartierville	1996	3rd term
Yolande Thibeault	Liberal	Saint-Lambert	1997	2nd term
**Alfonso Gagliano**	Liberal	Saint-Léonard—Saint-Michel	1984	5th term
Massimo Pacetti (2002)	Liberal	Saint-Léonard—Saint-Michel	2002	1st term
**Jean Chrétien** (Note: Liberal leader until November 14, 2003. Prime minister until December 12, 2003.)	Liberal	Saint-Maurice	1963, 1990	12th time*
Vacant		Saint-Maurice	1963, 1990	12th time*
Diane St-Jacques ‡	Liberal	Shefford	1997	2nd term
Serge Cardin	Bloc Québécois	Sherbrooke	1998	2nd term
Pierre Brien	Bloc Québécois	Témiscamingue	1993	3rd term
Pierre Brien	Independent	Témiscamingue	1993	3rd term
Gilbert Barrette (2003)	Liberal	Témiscamingue	2003	1st term
Diane Bourgeois	Bloc Québécois	Terrebonne—Blainville	2000	1st term
Yves Rocheleau	Bloc Québécois	Trois-Rivières	1993	3rd term
Nick Discepola	Liberal	Vaudreuil—Soulanges	1993	3rd term
Stéphane Bergeron	Bloc Québécois	Verchères—Les Patriotes	1993	3rd term
Raymond Lavigne	Liberal	Verdun—Saint-Henri—Saint-Paul—Pointe-Saint-Charles	1993	3rd term
**Liza Frulla** (2002)	Liberal	Verdun—Saint-Henri—Saint-Paul—Pointe-Saint-Charles	2002	1st term
**Lucienne Robillard**	Liberal	Westmount—Ville-Marie	1995	3rd term

=== Saskatchewan ===
Name	Party	Electoral district	First elected / previously elected	No. of terms
Gerry Ritz	Canadian Alliance	Battlefords—Lloydminster	1997	2nd term
Gerry Ritz	Conservative	Battlefords—Lloydminster	1997	2nd term
Lynne Yelich	Canadian Alliance	Blackstrap	2000	1st term
Lynne Yelich	Conservative	Blackstrap	2000	1st term
David L. Anderson	Canadian Alliance	Cypress Hills—Grasslands	2000	1st term
David L. Anderson	Conservative	Cypress Hills—Grasslands	2000	1st term
Rick Laliberte	Liberal	Churchill River	1997 (Note: First elected as a New Democrat)	2nd term
Dick Proctor	NDP	Palliser	1997	2nd term
Brian Fitzpatrick	Canadian Alliance	Prince Albert	2000	1st term
Brian Fitzpatrick	Independent Canadian Alliance	Prince Albert	2000	1st term
Brian Fitzpatrick	Democratic Representative	Prince Albert	2000	1st term
Brian Fitzpatrick	Canadian Alliance	Prince Albert	2000	1st term
Brian Fitzpatrick	Conservative	Prince Albert	2000	1st term
Larry Spencer	Canadian Alliance	Regina—Lumsden—Lake Centre	2000	1st term
Larry Spencer	Conservative	Regina—Lumsden—Lake Centre	2000	1st term
Larry Spencer	Independent	Regina—Lumsden—Lake Centre	2000	1st term
Lorne Nystrom	NDP	Regina—Qu'Appelle	1968, (Note: Yorkton—Melville) 1997	9th term*
Jim Pankiw	Canadian Alliance	Saskatoon—Humboldt	1997	2nd term
Jim Pankiw	Independent Canadian Alliance	Saskatoon—Humboldt	1997	2nd term
Jim Pankiw	Democratic Representative	Saskatoon—Humboldt	1997	2nd term
Jim Pankiw	Canadian Alliance	Saskatoon—Humboldt	1997	2nd term
Jim Pankiw	Independent	Saskatoon—Humboldt	1997	2nd term
Carol Skelton	Canadian Alliance	Saskatoon—Rosetown—Biggar	2000	1st term
Carol Skelton	Conservative	Saskatoon—Rosetown—Biggar	2000	1st term
Maurice Vellacott	Canadian Alliance	Saskatoon—Wanuskewin	1997	2nd term
Maurice Vellacott	Conservative	Saskatoon—Wanuskewin	1997	2nd term
Roy Bailey	Canadian Alliance	Souris—Moose Mountain	1997	2nd term
Roy Bailey	Conservative	Souris—Moose Mountain	1997	2nd term
**Ralph Goodale**	Liberal	Wascana	1974, (Note: Assiniboia) 1993	4th term*
Garry Breitkreuz	Canadian Alliance	Yorkton—Melville	1993	3rd term
Garry Breitkreuz	Conservative	Yorkton—Melville	1993	3rd term

=== Territories ===
Name	Party	Electoral district	First elected / previously elected	No. of terms
Nancy Karetak-Lindell	Liberal	Nunavut	1997	2nd term
**Ethel Blondin-Andrew**	Liberal	Western Arctic	1988	4th term
Larry Bagnell ‡	Liberal	Yukon	2000	1st term

== Changes since the 37th election ==
=== Former members of the 37th Parliament ===
Previous members of the House of Commons in the 37th Parliament of Canada.

Name	Party	Riding	Cause of departure	Succeeded by
Herb Gray	Liberal	Windsor West, ON	Retired January 14, 2002	Brian Masse (New Democrat)
Alfonso Gagliano	Liberal	Saint-Léonard—Saint-Michel, QC	Appointed Ambassador to Denmark January 14, 2002	Massimo Pacetti (Liberal)
Ronald Duhamel	Liberal	Saint Boniface, MB	Appointed to the Senate January 15, 2002	Raymond Simard (Liberal)
Brian Tobin	Liberal	Bonavista—Trinity—Conception, NF	Retired January 25, 2002	John Efford (Liberal)
Preston Manning	Canadian Alliance	Calgary Southwest, AB	Retired January 31, 2002	Stephen Harper (Canadian Alliance)
George S. Baker	Liberal	Gander—Grand Falls, NF	Appointed to the Senate March 26, 2002	Rex Barnes (Progressive Conservative)
Raymond Lavigne	Liberal	Verdun—Saint-Henri—Saint-Paul—Pointe-Saint-Charles, QC	Appointed to the Senate March 26, 2002	Liza Frulla (Liberal)
Stéphan Tremblay	Bloc Québécois	Lac-Saint-Jean—Saguenay, QC	Retired May 7, 2002	Sébastien Gagnon (Bloc Québécois)
Michel Bellehumeur	Bloc Québécois	Berthier—Montcalm, QC	Retired May 18, 2002	Roger Gaudet (Bloc Québécois)
John Richardson	Liberal	Perth—Middlesex, ON	Retired October 11, 2002	Gary Schellenberger (Progressive Conservative)
Pierre Brien	Independent §	Témiscamingue, QC	Retired 14 March 2003	Gilbert Barrette (Liberal)
Antoine Dubé	Bloc Québécois	Lévis-et-Chutes-de-la-Chaudière, QC	Retired March 17, 2003	Christian Jobin (Liberal)
Mac Harb	Liberal	Ottawa Centre, ON	Appointed to the Senate September 9, 2003	Ed Broadbent (New Democrat)
Jean Chrétien	Liberal	Saint-Maurice, QC	Retired and stepped down as prime minister December 12, 2003	Marcel Gagnon (Bloc Québécois)
Allan Rock	Liberal	Etobicoke Centre, ON	Appointed Ambassador to the United Nations December 12, 2003	Boris Wrzesnewskyj (Liberal)
John Harvard	Liberal	Charleswood—St. James—Assiniboia, MB	Resigned on May 6, 2004 and appointed lieutenant-governor of Manitoba the next day	Steven Fletcher (Conservative)

§ – formerly a member of the Bloc Québécois, sat as an independent from 16 January 2003 until retirement.
