= James Tunney =

James or Jim Tunney may refer to:

== Politics ==
- James Tunney (Irish politician) (1892–1964), Irish Labour Party politician
- Jim Tunney (Irish politician) (1923–2002), Irish Fianna Fáil politician, son of the above
- James Tunney (Canadian politician) (1927–2010), Canadian senator

== Others ==
- Jim Tunney (American football) (1929–2024), American football official
- James Joseph Tunney or Gene Tunney (1897–1978), American boxer
