= 2001 Canadian federal budget =

2001 Budget of the Canadian Federal Government
- Presented: 10 December 2001
- Country: Canada
- Parliament: 37th
- Party: Liberal
- Finance minister: Paul Martin
- Total revenue: 190.570 billion
- Total expenditures: 183.949 billion
- Surplus: C$6.621 billion

The Canadian federal budget for the fiscal year 2001–02 was presented by Minister of Finance Paul Martin in the House of Commons on December 10, 2001. It was known as the "Security Budget" for its focus on security after the September 11 attacks in the United States.

This was the last budget presented by Paul Martin as Minister of Finance. It was marked by the poor Canadian economy of the previous year that saw very slow growth. In order to keep the budget balanced, Martin proposed only limited new spending. The largest outlay was $7.7 billion over five years to improve security.

== Background ==
This budget was unusually presented in December 2001, as federal budgets are normally released in February or March. However, the election in November 2000 had been preceded by a detailed "budget update" for which covered most of the fiscal year 2001-2002.

The November 2000 Speech from the throne had announced it would attempt to improve the living conditions of indigenous communities, and so the 2001 budget was expected to include large investments in these communities. However, the September 11 attacks cause the government's priorities to change toward national security, which was reflected in the budget.

== Key elements ==
The main elements of this budget are linked to national security. An additional $1.2 billion was allocated to the Department of National Defence. The Royal Canadian Mounted Police and Canadian Security Intelligence Service also received budget increases, and sums were also allocated to expand the screening of migrants coming to Canada.

The Budget also allocated funds for greater airport security, including the instauration of sky Marshals for selected flights. The creation of a new agency responsible for airport protection and passenger safety was announced. This agency would become the Canadian Air Transport Security Authority, and would be funded by a special tax on air travel.

646 million dollars was also announced for reinforce border security, including $58 million to enhance the NEXUS program, $107 million to purchase better bomb detection equipment, $135 million to increase government agencies' presence at the border, and $67 million to invest in new technologies for border agents in airports and border crossings.

The Budget allocated $2 billion for the creation of the Strategic Infrastructure Fund. It was announced that an independent committee would review grant applications for this fund. 236 million dollars was allocated to the maintenance of veterans' hospitals, and the budget for ecological municipal projects was increased from 125 million to 250 million dollars.

== Reactions ==
=== Opposition parties ===
The Bloc Québécois and the New Democratic Party did not criticize the increase in security spendings, considering these sums necessary. They, however, criticize the lack of spending in Social Security, and the low level of investment in economic development.

The Canadian Alliance, on the other hand, critiqued the lack of tax cuts in the budget, something they considered was needed to boost the economy. The Canadian Alliance also stated that the budget did not spend enough on security, when compared to the other NATO countries' response to the September 11 attacks. Stockwell Day also came out against the increases in the CBC budget, Foreign Aid, and cultural fundings.

Joe Clark, leader of the PC-DR coalition, criticized the lack of a long-term vision in the budget, considering it sacrificed the country's long-term prosperity while doing very little to increase national security.

=== Municipalities ===
Yves Ducharme, mayor of Hull and vice-president of the Federation of Canadian Municipalities, expressed support for the Strategic Infrastructure Fund, but made known he was disappointed by the lack of funds for public transportation in the budget. Montreal mayor Gérald Tremblay and Laval mayor Gilles Vaillancourt both expressed support for the budget and the Strategic Infrastructure Fund as well.

=== Provinces ===
Most provinces lamented the lack of increase in health transfers, as the premiers had called for in their last conference in August 2001. Alberta and Ontario claimed that without these transfers, they would be forced to privatise some hospital services traditionally part of Medicare. Ontario premier Mike Harris claimed that, without these health transfers, the federal government forces 8 provinces to run a deficit in their next budget. Manitoba premier Gary Doer said that the government's decision to prioritize security over health care was error of judgment.
