= 37th Canadian Parliament =

2001–04 legislative term

- Majority parliament
- Jan. 29, 2001 – May. 23, 2004

Parliament leaders
- Prime minister: Rt. Hon. Jean Chrétien; Nov. 4, 1993 – Dec. 12, 2003
- Rt. Hon. Paul Martin; Dec. 12, 2003 – Feb. 6, 2006
- Cabinets: 26th Canadian Ministry; 27th Canadian Ministry
- Leader of the Opposition: Hon. Stockwell Day; September 11, 2000 – December 11, 2001
- Hon. John Reynolds; December 12, 2001 – May 20, 2002
- Hon. Stephen Harper; May 21, 2002 – January 8, 2004
- Hon. Grant Hill; January 9, 2004 – March 19, 2004
- Hon. Stephen Harper; March 20, 2004 – February 6, 2006

Party caucuses
- Government: Liberal Party
- Opposition: Canadian Alliance*
- Senate Opp.: Progressive Conservative*
- Recognized: Bloc Québécois
- New Democratic Party
- Unrecognized: Democratic Representative Caucus
- * Parties merged partway through the Parliament to create the Conservative Party of Canada. Some members retained the designation of Progressive Conservative in the Senate.

House of Commons
- Seating arrangements of the House of Commons
- Speaker of the Commons: Hon. Peter Milliken; January 29, 2001 – June 2, 2011
- Government House leader: Don Boudria; June 11, 1997 – January 14, 2002
- Ralph Goodale; January 15, 2002 – May 25, 2002
- Don Boudria; May 26, 2002 – August 11, 2004
- Jacques Saada; August 12, 2004 – August 22, 2004
- Opposition House leader: Randy White; December 18, 2001 – April 3, 2002
- John Reynolds; April 4, 2002 – December 22, 2003
- Loyola Hearn; December 23, 2003 – March 21, 2004
- John Reynolds; March 22, 2004 – January 27, 2005
- Members: 301 seats MP seats List of members

Senate
- Seating arrangements of the Senate
- Speaker of the Senate: Hon. Daniel Hays; January 26, 2001 – February 7, 2006
- Government Senate leader: Sharon Carstairs; January 9, 2001 – August 11, 2004
- Jack Austin; August 12, 2004 – February 6, 2006
- Opposition Senate leader: John Lynch-Staunton; October 25, 1993 – July 16, 2004
- Senators: 105 seats senator seats List of senators

Sovereign
- Monarch: HM Elizabeth II; 6 February 1952 – 8 September 2022
- Governor general: HE Rt. Hon. Adrienne Clarkson; October 7, 1999 – February 27, 2005

Sessions
- 1st session January 29, 2001 – September 16, 2002
- 2nd session September 30, 2002 – November 12, 2003
- 3rd session February 2, 2004 – May 23, 2004
← 36th	→ 38th

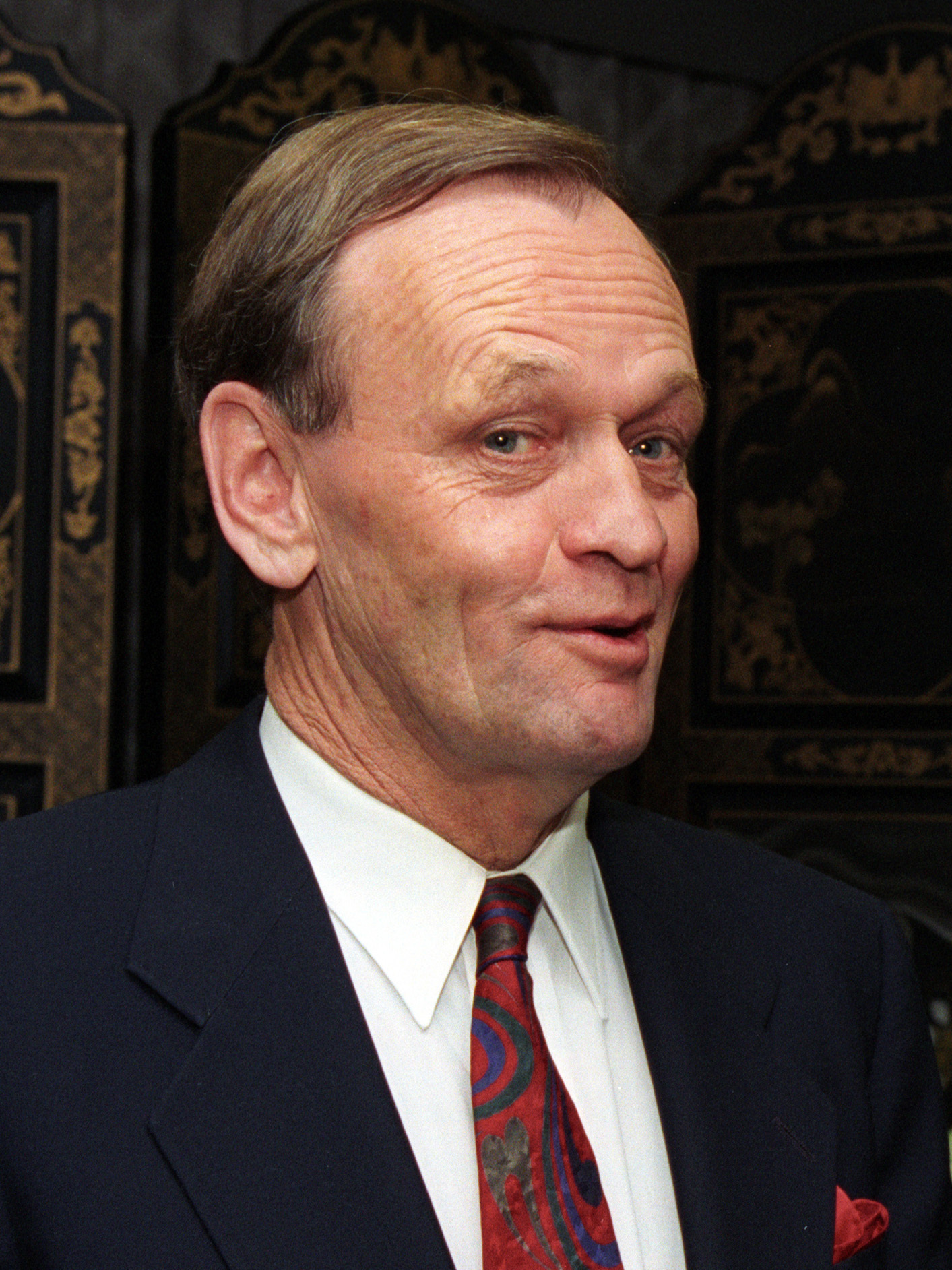
Jean Chrétien was Prime Minister during most of the 37th Canadian Parliament.

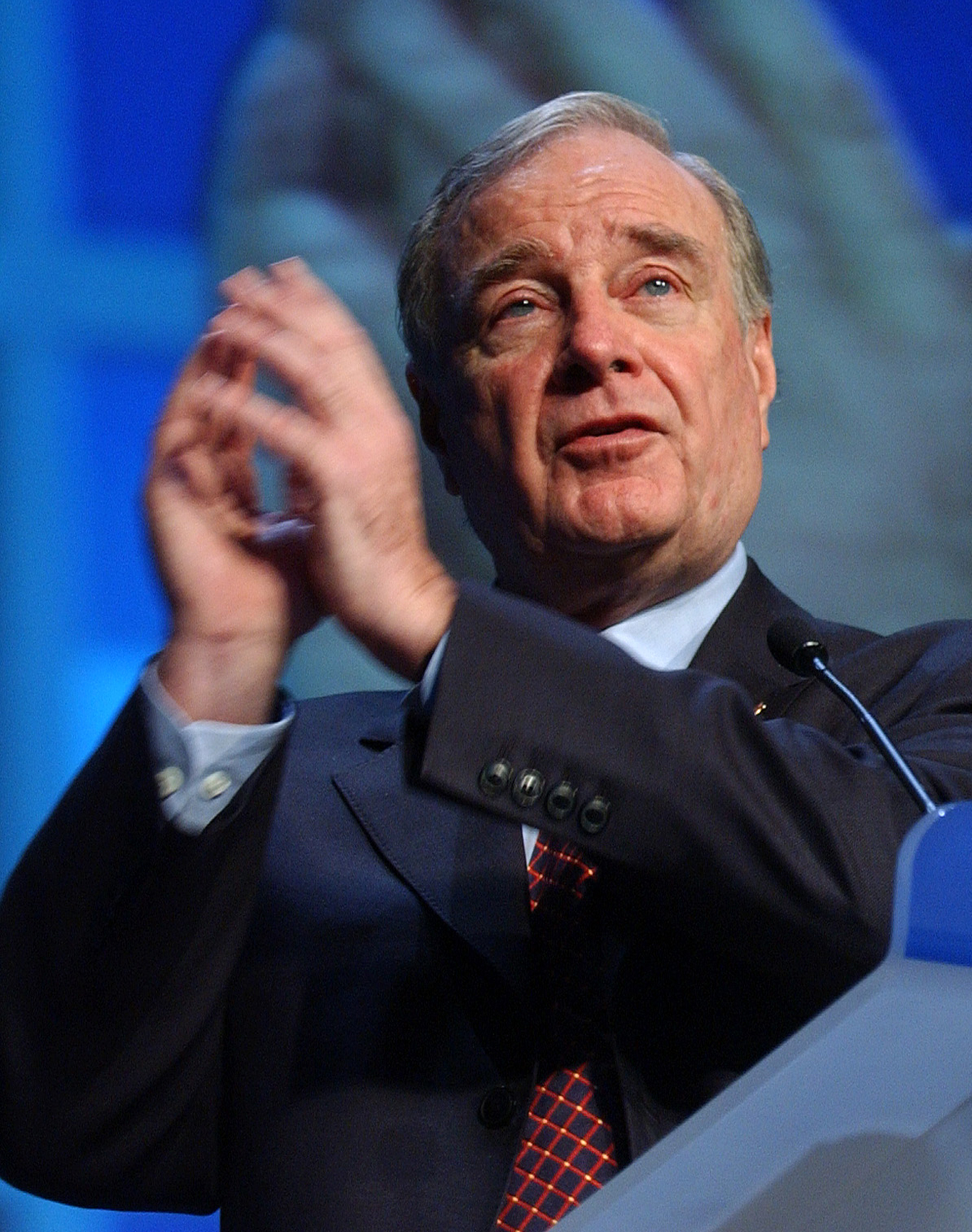
Paul Martin was Prime Minister at the end of the 37th Canadian Parliament.

The 37th Canadian Parliament was in session from January 29, 2001, until May 23, 2004. The membership was set by the 2000 federal election on November 27, 2000, and it changed only somewhat due to resignations and by-elections until it was dissolved prior to the 2004 election.

There were three sessions of the 37th Parliament:

Session	Start	End
1st	January 29, 2001	September 16, 2002
2nd	September 30, 2002	November 12, 2003
3rd	February 2, 2004	May 23, 2004

== Overview ==
It was controlled by a Liberal Party majority, led first by Prime Minister Jean Chrétien and the 26th Canadian Ministry, and then by Prime Minister Paul Martin and the 27th Canadian Ministry. The Official Opposition was formed by first the Canadian Alliance, led by Stockwell Day and then by Stephen Harper, and then by its successor party, the Conservative Party, also led by Harper.

== Party standings ==
The party standings as of the election and as of dissolution were as follows:

Affiliation	House members		Senate members	
Affiliation	2000 election results	At dissolution	On election day 2000	At dissolution
Liberal	172	168	55	65
Alliance	66	—N/a	1	—N/a
Bloc Québécois	38	33	0	0
New Democratic	13	14	0	0
Progressive Conservative	12	—N/a	35	—N/a
Conservative	—N/a	72	—N/a	24
Independent	0	10	5	5
Senate PC	—N/a	0	—N/a	3
Total members	301	297	96	97
Vacant	0	4	9	8
Total seats	301		105	

In 2001, 13 MPs opposed to the leadership of Stockwell Day left the Canadian Alliance and formed the Democratic Representative Caucus. Chuck Strahl was chosen leader of the caucus, which subsequently entered into a coalition agreement with the Progressive Conservative Party of Canada. In 2002, after Day had lost the leadership of his party to Stephen Harper, all but one DRC MP rejoined the Canadian Alliance.

== Ministry ==
The 26th Canadian Ministry was formed at the beginning of the 35th Canadian Parliament and lasted through the 36th Canadian Parliament and the majority of the 37th Canadian Parliament. The 27th Canadian Ministry was formed at the beginning of the 37th Canadian Parliament.

== Officeholders ==
=== Head of State ===
Office	Photo	Name	Assumed office	Left office
Sovereign		Elizabeth II	February 6, 1952	September 8, 2022
Governor General		Adrienne Clarkson	October 7, 1999	September 27, 2005

=== Party leadership ===
Party	Photo	Name	Assumed Office	Left Office
Liberal		Jean Chrétien	June 23, 1990	November 14, 2003
Liberal		Paul Martin	November 14, 2003	March 19, 2006
Alliance		Stockwell Day	July 8, 2000	December 11, 2001
Alliance		John Reynolds (Interim)	December 11, 2001	March 20, 2002
Alliance		Stephen Harper	March 20, 2002	December 7, 2003
Progressive Conservative		Joe Clark	November 14, 1998	May 31, 2003
Progressive Conservative		Peter MacKay	May 31, 2003	December 7, 2003
Conservative (PC/Alliance merger)		John Lynch-Staunton	December 8, 2003	March 20, 2004
Conservative (PC/Alliance merger)		Stephen Harper	March 20, 2004	October 19, 2015
Bloc Québécois		Gilles Duceppe	March 15, 1997	May 2, 2011
New Democratic		Alexa McDonough	October 14, 1995	January 25, 2003
New Democratic		Jack Layton	January 25, 2003	August 22, 2011

==== Government leadership (Liberal) ====
Office	Photo	Officer	Riding	Assumed Office	Left Office
Prime Minister		Jean_Chrétien	Saint-Maurice	November 4, 1993	December 12, 2003
Prime Minister		Paul Martin	LaSalle—Émard	December 12, 2003	February 6, 2006
House Leader		Don Boudria (1st time)	Glengarry–Prescott–Russell	June 11, 1997	January 15, 2002
House Leader		Ralph Goodale	Regina—Wascana	January 15, 2002	May 26, 2002
House Leader		Don Boudria (2nd time)	Glengarry–Prescott–Russell	May 26, 2002	December 12, 2003
House Leader		Jacques Saada	Brossard—La Prairie	December 12, 2003	July 20, 2004
Whip		Marlene Catterall	Ottawa West—Nepean	2001	2003
Whip		Mauril Bélanger	Ottawa—Vanier	2003	2004

== Changes to party standings ==
=== By-elections ===
By-election	Date	Incumbent	Party	Winner	Party	Cause	Retained
Lévis-et-Chutes-de-la-Chaudière	June 16, 2003	Antoine Dubé	Bloc Québécois	Christian Jobin	Liberal	Resigned to enter provincial politics	No
Témiscamingue	June 16, 2003	Pierre Brien	Bloc Québécois	Gilbert Barrette	Liberal	Resigned to enter provincial politics	No
Perth—Middlesex	May 21, 2003	John Richardson	Liberal	Gary Schellenberger	Progressive Conservative	Resigned	No
Berthier—Montcalm	December 9, 2002	Michel Bellehumeur	Bloc Québécois	Roger Gaudet	Bloc Québécois	Resigned	Yes
Lac-Saint-Jean—Saguenay	December 9, 2002	Stéphan Tremblay	Bloc Québécois	Sébastien Gagnon	Bloc Québécois	Resigned to enter provincial politics	Yes
Calgary Southwest	May 13, 2002	Preston Manning	Canadian Alliance	Stephen Harper	Canadian Alliance	Resigned	Yes
Saint Boniface	May 13, 2002	Ron Duhamel	Liberal	Raymond Simard	Liberal	Appointed to the Senate	Yes
Bonavista—Trinity—Conception	May 13, 2002	Brian Tobin	Liberal	John Efford	Liberal	Resigned	Yes
Gander—Grand Falls	May 13, 2002	George Baker	Liberal	Rex Barnes	Progressive Conservative	Appointed to the Senate	No
Windsor West	May 13, 2002	Herb Gray	Liberal	Brian Masse	New Democratic	Resigned to accept appointment as Chair of the Canadian Section of the International Joint Commission	No
Saint-Léonard—Saint-Michel	May 13, 2002	Alfonso Gagliano	Liberal	Massimo Pacetti	Liberal	Resigned to accept appointment as Ambassador to Denmark	Yes
Verdun—Saint-Henri—Saint-Paul—Pointe Saint-Charles	May 13, 2002	Raymond Lavigne	Liberal	Liza Frulla	Liberal	Appointed to the Senate	Yes

== Legislation and motions ==
Important bills of the 37th parliament include:

- Assisted Human Reproduction Act
- Canadian federal budget, 2001
- Canadian federal budget, 2003
- Canadian federal budget, 2004
- Bill C-250, declared attacks based on sexual orientation to be hate crimes.
- Immigration and Refugee Protection Act
- Youth Criminal Justice Act
- Pledge to Africa Act
- Anti-Terrorism Act

== See also ==
- list of Canadian electoral districts 1996-2003 for a list of the ridings in this parliament.
