= Royce Frith =

Canadian diplomat, public servant and politician

The Honourable Royce Frith CM, QC

Canadian High Commissioner to the United Kingdom
- In office 1994–1996
- Prime Minister: Jean Chrétien
- Preceded by: Fredrik Stefan Eaton
- Succeeded by: Roy MacLaren

Leader of the Opposition in the Senate of Canada
- In office September 30, 1991 – September 1, 1993
- Preceded by: Allan MacEachen
- Succeeded by: John Lynch-Staunton

Deputy Leader of the Opposition in the Senate of Canada
- In office November 1984 – September 1991
- Preceded by: Dufferin Roblin
- Succeeded by: Gildas Molgat

Deputy Leader of the Government in the Senate of Canada
- In office April 1980 – September 1984
- Preceded by: Dufferin Roblin
- Succeeded by: C. William Doody

Canadian Senator from Ontario
- In office April 5, 1977 – August 29, 1994
- Appointed by: Pierre Trudeau

Personal details
- Born: November 12, 1923 Lachine, Quebec, Canada
- Died: March 17, 2005 (aged 81) Vancouver, British Columbia, Canada
- Party: Liberal
- Education: University of Toronto; York University; University of Ottawa
- Occupation: Lawyer; diplomat; broadcaster

Royce Herbert Frith, CM QC (November 12, 1923 – March 17, 2005) was a Canadian diplomat, public servant, lawyer, broadcaster, and politician.

== Education ==
He received a BA from the University of Toronto, an LL.B from Osgoode Hall Law School and a Dipl. d’études supérieures (droit) from the University of Ottawa. He was admitted to the Ontario Bar in 1949 and would become a partner in the Toronto firm of Magwood, Frith & Casey, specializing in litigation, municipal and broadcast and entertainment industry law.

== Broadcasting ==
An amateur actor and performer, Frith found time to act in plays, perform on the radio, and sing and play several instruments, while concurrently building his legal career. In 1949, he hosted western music show Home on the Range on radio station CFRB in Toronto. He also sang in a choir as a youth that appeared regularly on CBC Radio and continued to appear on CBC singing in radio operas, acting in dramas such on the anthology series Wednesday Night and Stage and as a panelist on The Superior Sex and Live A Borrowed Life on CBC Television in the 1950s. In the 1960s he presented the public affairs show Telepoll on the CTV Television Network for several seasons.

Frith successfully applied to the Board of Broadcast Governors in 1963 for a license to operate a new radio station in Windsor, Ontario. Frith was awarded a license to operate CKWW-AM but sold the station to Geoff Stirling before it went on the air.

== Early political career ==
A resident of the Toronto suburb of Leaside, Ontario, Frith was elected to Leaside town council in the 1950s first as councillor and later as Deputy Reeve before he and his law firm were appointed the town's solicitors.

Active in Liberal Party politics, Frith was president of the Ontario Liberal Party from 1960 to 1961.

== Federal government and Senate ==
Frith first came to prominence as a member of the Royal Commission on Bilingualism and Biculturalism in the 1960s. He served as a legal advisor to the Commissioner of Official Languages from 1971 until 1977 when he was appointed to the Senate of Canada by Pierre Trudeau. He sat in the Upper House as a Liberal and served in various positions including Leader of the Opposition in the Canadian Senate and led the Liberals' filibuster against the introduction of the Goods and Services Tax forcing Prime Minister Brian Mulroney to use an obscure section of the Constitution to appoint extra Senators and ensure passage of the measure.

== High Commissioner ==
Frith left the Upper House in 1994 to become Canada's High Commissioner to the United Kingdom. Frith had a very high profile and used his flair for public performance to his advantage, particularly during Canada's Turbot War with Spain in which he played a crucial role in rallying British public opinion behind Canada. Frith also ensured the retention of Canada House in Trafalgar Square as the site of the Canadian high commission when the government had considered abandoning the location in order to save money. Frith returned to Canada in 1996 and resumed his law practice.

== Later life ==
In his last years, Firth was a lawyer with the firm Ladner Downs in Vancouver and went into the office daily until just a few weeks prior to his death. He served on various boards including the Board of Trustees of the National Arts Centre in Ottawa. Frith has also served on the governing bodies of the Lester B. Pearson United World College of the Pacific and the Vancouver Symphony. In 2000 he was appointed a member of the Order of Canada.

== Bibliography ==
- Frith, Royce (1991). Hoods on the Hill: How Mulroney and His Gang Rammed the GST Past Parliament and Down Our Throats. Toronto, ON: Coach House Press. ISBN 9780889104303. OCLC 796996447.
- —; Kuchar, Len (1993). The show must not go on. Montreal, QC: Robert Davies Publishing. ISBN 9781895854213. OCLC 30484876.

Government offices
Preceded by Allan MacEachen	Leader of the Opposition in the Senate of Canada; 1991–1993	Succeeded by John Lynch-Staunton
Diplomatic posts
Preceded by Fredrik Stefan Eaton	Canadian High Commissioner to the United Kingdom; 1994–1996	Succeeded by Roy MacLaren
