= Gérald Beaudoin =

Canadian politician

The Honourable Gérald Beaudoin OC OQ MSRC

Senator for Rigaud senate division
- In office 1988–2004
- Appointed by: Brian Mulroney
- Preceded by: Jean Le Moyne
- Succeeded by: Yoine Goldstein

Personal details
- Born: April 15, 1929 Montreal, Quebec, Canada
- Died: September 10, 2008 (aged 79) Hull, Quebec, Canada
- Party: Conservative (2004)
- Other political affiliations: Progressive Conservative (1988–2004)

Gérald A. Beaudoin OC OQ MSRC (April 15, 1929 – September 10, 2008) was a Canadian lawyer and Senator.

Born in Montreal, Quebec, he received a B.A., an LL.L and an M.A. from the Université de Montréal. He was called to the Quebec Bar in 1954.

He was appointed to the Senate in 1988 representing the Senatorial division of Rigaud, Quebec. He retired at the mandatory age of 75 in 2004. He sat as a Progressive Conservative and then as a Conservative.

After his political career, he taught constitutional law at the faculty of civil law at the University of Ottawa.

== Honours ==
In 1980, he was made an Officer of the Order of Canada. In 2001, he was made a Commander of the Order of the Crown. In 2004 he received the French Legion of Honour. In 2008, he was made an Officer of the National Order of Quebec.
