= Léonce Mercier =

Canadian politician (1926–2019)

The Honourable Léonce Mercier

Senator for Mille Isles senate division
- In office August 9, 1996 – August 11, 2001
- Appointed by: Jean Chrétien
- Preceded by: Jean-Louis Roux
- Succeeded by: Michel Biron

Personal details
- Born: 11 August 1926 Kénogami, Quebec
- Died: 27 December 2019 (aged 93)
- Party: Liberal Party of Canada

Léonce Mercier (August 11, 1926 – December 27, 2019) was a Canadian Senator from Quebec as well as a businessman and consultant.

Mercier is a long-time activist and organizer in the Liberal Party of Canada in Quebec under Pierre Trudeau and Jean Chrétien and Quebec Liberal Party during the leadership of Jean Lesage and Robert Bourassa. He began his involvement in northern Quebec in the Saguenay–Lac-Saint-Jean region.

In 1995, he was in charge of the Action Canada national unity campaign in the region during the 1995 Quebec referendum and was also an organizer for the "No" side during the 1980 Quebec referendum.

He was director general of the Liberal Party of Quebec from 1978 to 1985.

Mercier was a leading Quebec organizer of Jean Chrétien's campaigns for the leadership of the federal Liberal Party at the 1984 and 1990 federal Liberal leadership convention.

He was an organizer of Jean Lesage's successful campaign to lead the Quebec Liberal Party and also organized for Bourassa's leadership campaign. He was a candidate for the Quebec Liberal Party in the 1970 provincial election in the electoral district of Dubuc but was defeated by the Union Nationale candidate. In 1978, he was an organizer for the unsuccessful leadership campaign of Raymond Garneau.

Mercier was appointed to the Canadian Senate by Jean Chrétien in 1996 and retired in 2001 upon reaching the mandatory retirement age of 75. He served as Whip of the Senate Liberal caucus from 1998 until his retirement.

He also served from 1988 until 1995 as a commissioner of Quebec's Régie des alcools, des courses et des jeux regulatory agency.

In his earlier life he worked variously as a car salesman in a Ford dealership, an inspector for a lumber company, an agent for independent truckers. In the 1980s he was a business and public relations consultant.

== Sources ==
- Senate of Canada retirement tributes to Léonce Mercier, October 24, 2001
- Léonce Mercier – Parliament of Canada biography
