= Gerard Phalen =

Canadian politician, educator, and union leader (1934–2021)

Gerard A. "Jigger" Phalen (March 28, 1934 – October 25, 2021) was a former Canadian Senator, educator, and union leader.

== Early life ==
Phalen was from Glace Bay, Nova Scotia He was an industrial mechanical instructor at the Nova Scotia Eastern Institute of Technology and then at the University College of Cape Breton (now Cape Breton University) until his retirement in 1991. Active in the Nova Scotia Government Employees Union, he served as its president from 1976 to 1979. He has also served as chairman of the faculty association at NSEIT and in various other academic capacities at UCCB.

== Political career ==
He was appointed to the Canadian Senate by Prime Minister Jean Chrétien in 2001 and sat in the upper house as a Liberal. He left the Senate upon reaching the mandatory retirement age of 75 on March 28, 2009.

== Personal life ==
Phalen and his wife Christina Phalen had three children.
