= Marisa Ferretti Barth =

Canadian politician (1931–2021)

The Honourable Marisa Ferretti Barth

Senator for Repentigny, Quebec
- In office September 22, 1997 – April 28, 2006
- Appointed by: Jean Chrétien
- Preceded by: Pietro Rizzuto
- Succeeded by: Patrick Brazeau

Personal details
- Born: April 28, 1931 Ascoli Piceno, Italy
- Died: March 28, 2021 (aged 89)
- Party: Liberal

Marisa Ferretti Barth OQ (April 28, 1931 – March 28, 2021) was a Canadian Senator.

== Life and career ==
Born in Ascoli Piceno, Italy, Marisa Ferretti Barth was a social worker, human resources consultant and community organizer before her appointment to the Senate. She established 84 seniors' clubs for Italian-Canadians as well as helping found a seniors' club for Chinese Canadians in Montreal as well as seniors organizations for other ethnic groups. She founded the Regional Council of Italian-Canadian Seniors serving as its executive director since 1975 and also was a board member of the National Congress of Italian Canadians in the 1980s.

She was appointed to the Senate on September 22, 1997 on the advice of Prime Minister Jean Chrétien and represented the province of Quebec. She sat as a Liberal, until her mandatory retirement at the age of 75 on April 28, 2006.

== Honours ==
In 2008, she was made an Officer of the National Order of Quebec. In 2003, she was made a Grand Officer of the Order of Merit of the Italian Republic.
