= Michel Biron =

Canadian politician (1934–2023)

The Honourable Michel Biron C.M.

Senator for Mille Isles senate division
- In office October 4, 2001 – March 16, 2009
- Appointed by: Jean Chrétien
- Preceded by: Léonce Mercier
- Succeeded by: Claude Carignan

Personal details
- Born: March 16, 1934 Nicolet, Quebec, Canada
- Died: April 26, 2023 (aged 89)
- Party: Liberal Party of Canada

Michel Biron, CM (March 16, 1934 – April 26, 2023) was a Canadian politician who served as a Senator from 2001 to 2009. Biron was appointed on the advice of Prime Minister Jean Chrétien, to represent the Canadian senatorial division of Mille Isles, Quebec as a member of the Liberal Party of Canada, on October 4, 2001. Biron was appointed a Member of the Order of Canada in 2001.

On 10 June 2005, Senator Biron declared that the conditions placed on Karla Homolka's release were "totalitarian", according to an interview with CTV Newsnet. Two weeks later, Biron apologized.

Biron left the Senate on March 16, 2009, upon reaching the mandatory retirement age of 75. He lived in Nicolet, Quebec.

Biron died on April 26, 2023, at the age of 89.
