= James Tunney (Canadian politician) =

Canadian dairy farmer and politician

The Honourable James Francis "Jim" Tunney

Canadian Senator from Ontario
- In office March 8, 2001 – June 16, 2002
- Appointed by: Jean Chrétien

Personal details
- Born: June 16, 1927 Grafton, Ontario, Canada
- Died: September 22, 2010 (aged 83) Cobourg, Ontario, Canada
- Party: Liberal
- Spouse: Gladys Badgerow

James Francis "Jim" Tunney (June 16, 1927 – September 22, 2010) was a Canadian dairy farmer and member of the Senate of Canada.

== Background ==
Born in Grafton, Ontario, Tunney was a fourth generation farmer from Northumberland County, Ontario. He was a director of the Dairy Farmers of Canada for 18 years, a director of the Dairy Bureau of Canada for 8 years, and a director of the Ontario Milk Marketing Board for 12 years. For 16 years, he was a Trustee with the Peterborough, Victoria, Northumberland & Clarington District Separate School Board.

He was summoned to the Senate of Canada for the Ontario senatorial division of Grafton on the advice of Prime Minister Jean Chrétien in 2001. A Liberal, he served for 1 year and 3 months until his mandatory retirement at the age of 75 in 2002.
