= Democratic Representative Caucus =

Democratic Representative Caucus Caucus démocratique représentatif
- Former federal parliamentary caucus
- Leader: Chuck Strahl
- Founded: 2001
- Dissolved: 2002
- Split from: Canadian Alliance
- Merged into: Canadian Alliance
- Ideology: Conservatism

The Democratic Representative Caucus, also called the Democratic Representative Association, was a parliamentary group in the 37th Canadian Parliament consisting of Members of Parliament who left the Canadian Alliance in 2001 in protest against the leadership of Stockwell Day.

== Formation ==
Following the Alliance's disappointing performance in the 2000 election, Day came under severe criticism from his own party, and several high-profile Alliance MPs began publicly calling for him to step down. Through the spring of 2001, several members of the Alliance resigned their shadow cabinet seats, the most high-profile resignation being that of deputy leader Deborah Grey.

On May 2, Art Hanger was the first Alliance MP formally suspended from caucus for criticizing Day. Over the next two months, 11 other Alliance MPs were either suspended from caucus or resigned. On May 16, Hanger was followed by Chuck Strahl, Gary Lunn, Jim Pankiw, Val Meredith, Grant McNally, Jay Hill and Jim Gouk. In late June, they were joined by Monte Solberg, Andy Burton and Brian Fitzpatrick, and in the first week of July by Grey and Inky Mark.

At this time Day attempted to solve the crisis by offering to take a temporary leave of absence from the leadership if the dissidents returned to the party, but he withdrew the offer after the dissident MPs refused his conditions. Through the summer, the MPs sat as "Independent Alliance Caucus", and were jokingly dubbed the "Rebel Alliance" by political commentators.

In early September, a new offer was made to the MPs in which they would be readmitted to the Alliance caucus if they promised to refrain from criticizing Day's leadership. The MPs surveyed their constituents, and the offer was accepted by Hanger, Gouk, Solberg, Fitzpatrick and Burton. The remaining seven MPs refused, and formed the Democratic Representative Caucus on September 12, with Strahl as its parliamentary leader and Grey as deputy leader. This was not intended as a new political party, but simply as a group caucus. The MPs immediately entered a coalition agreement with the Progressive Conservatives.

== Coalition with the Progressive Conservatives ==
The PC-DRC Coalition was intended to be PC leader Joe Clark's framework for proving that the two parties could be united on his terms rather than Day's. To that end, Clark and Strahl tried to propose common policies that would appeal to both PC and Alliance members. Clark remained the leader of the coalition caucus, with Strahl as deputy leader and Grey as caucus chairwoman.

Two weeks later, on September 24, the "Progressive Conservative - Democratic Reform Coalition Caucus" made their formal debut in the House of Commons of Canada. Speaker Peter Milliken ruled that the arrangement would be recognized as a coalition, but would not gain all of the parliamentary privileges of being a unified party; for example, although the coalition caucus now had more MPs than the New Democratic Party, Milliken ruled that the coalition would not outrank the NDP in party precedence matters, such as speaking order or seating.

While the DRC members insisted that they remained loyal to the Canadian Alliance despite their opposition to Day's leadership, the group founded the Democratic Representative Association (DRA) to support their re-election campaigns as DRC Members of Parliament.

On November 19, Lunn left the DRC to rejoin the Alliance shortly after Day agreed to hold a new Alliance leadership race, although the party forced him to issue a public apology for his role in the schism before readmitting him to the caucus. The remaining DRC members were formally expelled as members of the Canadian Alliance in December.

== End of the coalition ==
In March 2002, Day lost that leadership race to Stephen Harper. In April five of the seven DRC members returned to the Alliance caucus, terminating their coalition agreement with the PCs. Pankiw's request for readmission to the Alliance caucus was denied, as he was embroiled in a political controversy involving a violent confrontation with a First Nations constituent. Mark chose not to return to the Alliance caucus, instead sitting as an Independent Conservative, then joining the PC caucus in August.

Clark's successor, Peter MacKay, negotiated a merger with the CA in late 2003, and he, along with Mark and most of the PC caucus, joined with the CA caucus to form the Conservative Party of Canada, fulfilling the DRC's main goal of a unified centre-right. Clark and a few other prominent PC MPs and senators refused to join the new party, whilst Pankiw was again refused admission along with another Saskatchewan CA MP, Larry Spencer.

== See also ==
- Unite the Right (Canada)
