= W. David Angus =

Canadian lawyer and senator (born 1937)

The Honourable W. David Angus KC

Senator for Alma, Quebec
- In office June 10, 1993 – July 21, 2012
- Appointed by: Brian Mulroney
- Preceded by: Hartland Molson

Personal details
- Born: July 21, 1937 (age 89) Toronto, Ontario, Canada
- Party: Conservative
- Profession: Lawyer

W. David Angus KC (born July 21, 1937) is a Canadian lawyer and former Canadian senator.

== Career ==
Born in Toronto, Ontario, in 1937, Angus moved to Montreal with his family at the age of nine and has been based there ever since. Educated at Lower Canada College, Princeton University, where he played varsity hockey and golf, and McGill University Faculty of Law, Angus is a lawyer and senior partner at the firm of Stikeman Elliott in Montreal.

Angus was the Progressive Conservative Party of Canada's chief fundraiser throughout Brian Mulroney's period as party leader being chairman of the PC Canada Fund from 1983 to 1983. He remained chairman emeritus of the Fund until the demise of the party in 2003. Conservative Party of Canada leader Stephen Harper appointed Angus to the Conservative Fund Canada in 2005 and he became once again chairman emeritus. He was appointed Queen's Counsel in 1984 and served on the board of Air Canada from 1985 until 2004.

He was appointed to the Senate by Governor General Ray Hnatyshyn on the advice of Prime Minister Brian Mulroney, on June 10, 1993, days before the prime minister's retirement. Angus sat as a Progressive Conservative senator until the party's demise and then sat as a supporter of the Conservative Party of Canada. He reached mandatory retirement from the Senate at 75 years old on July 21, 2012. Angus also served on the board of the MUHC, resigning after co-chair Arthur Porter had fled to Panama to avoid indictment in Quebec for graft.

== Senate committees ==
=== Chair ===
- Energy, the Environment and Natural Resources (2009–2010)
- Banking, Trade, and Commerce (2007–2008)

=== Vice-Chair ===
- Special Committee on Senate Reform (2006–2007)
- Banking, Trade, and Commerce (1996–2007)
