= Ross Fitzpatrick =

Canadian politician (born 1933)

David Ross Fitzpatrick OC OBC (born February 4, 1933) is a former Canadian Senator representing the Senatorial district of Okanagan-Similkameen, British Columbia.

Born in Kelowna, British Columbia, Fitzpatrick received a Bachelor of Commerce and Business Administration degree from the University of British Columbia in 1958, where he initiated into the Phi Delta Theta fraternity. He did postgraduate studies in economics at the University of Maryland in 1962 and in business administration at Columbia University from 1962 to 1963.

A successful businessman, Fitzpatrick was appointed to the senate on the advice of Jean Chrétien in March 1998. He sat as a Liberal. He reached the mandatory retirement age on February 4, 2008.

His business interests are varied and include being the proprietor of CedarCreek Estate Winery, General Partner DRF & Associates, Chairman of Greata Ranch Development Corporation and Chairman of Channel Resources. Fitzpatrick was the founder and CEO of Viceroy Resource Corporation.

In 2009, he was made a Member of the Order of British Columbia and an Officer of the Order of Canada in 2021.
