= Jean-Claude Rivest =

Canadian politician (born 1943)

The Honourable Jean-Claude Rivest

Senator for Stadacona, Quebec
- In office 1993–2015
- Appointed by: Brian Mulroney
- Preceded by: Claude Castonguay
- Succeeded by: Marc Gold

Personal details
- Born: January 27, 1943 (age 83) L'Assomption, Quebec
- Party: Independent (2004-present); Conservative (2003-2004); Progressive Conservative (1993-2003)

Jean-Claude Rivest (born January 27, 1943) is a Canadian lawyer, former politician and Senator.

Born in L'Assomption, Quebec, the son of Victor Rivest and Yvette Lafortune, he studied law at the Université de Montréal. He was called to the Quebec Bar in 1966. He practiced law from 1966 to 1967, until he started working for Jean Lesage. From 1970 to 1976, he worked for Robert Bourassa, Premier of Quebec. From 1976 to 1979, he worked for Gérard D. Levesque, leader of the Official Opposition in the National Assembly of Quebec. In 1979, he was elected to the National Assembly as a Liberal Party candidate in a by-election in the riding of Jean-Talon. He was re-elected in the 1981 general election.

He was appointed to the Senate on the recommendation of Prime Minister Brian Mulroney in 1993. He initially sat as a Progressive Conservative Senator. Upon that party's merger with the Canadian Alliance, he sat in the newly formed Conservative Party caucus. In September 2004, he changed his designation to "Independent". He was a member of the Senate Legal and Constitutional Affairs committee.

Rivest retired from the Senate at the end of January 2015, three years prior to reaching the mandatory retirement age of 75.
