= Noël Kinsella =

Canadian politician (1939–2023)

The Honourable Noël Kinsella PC CD
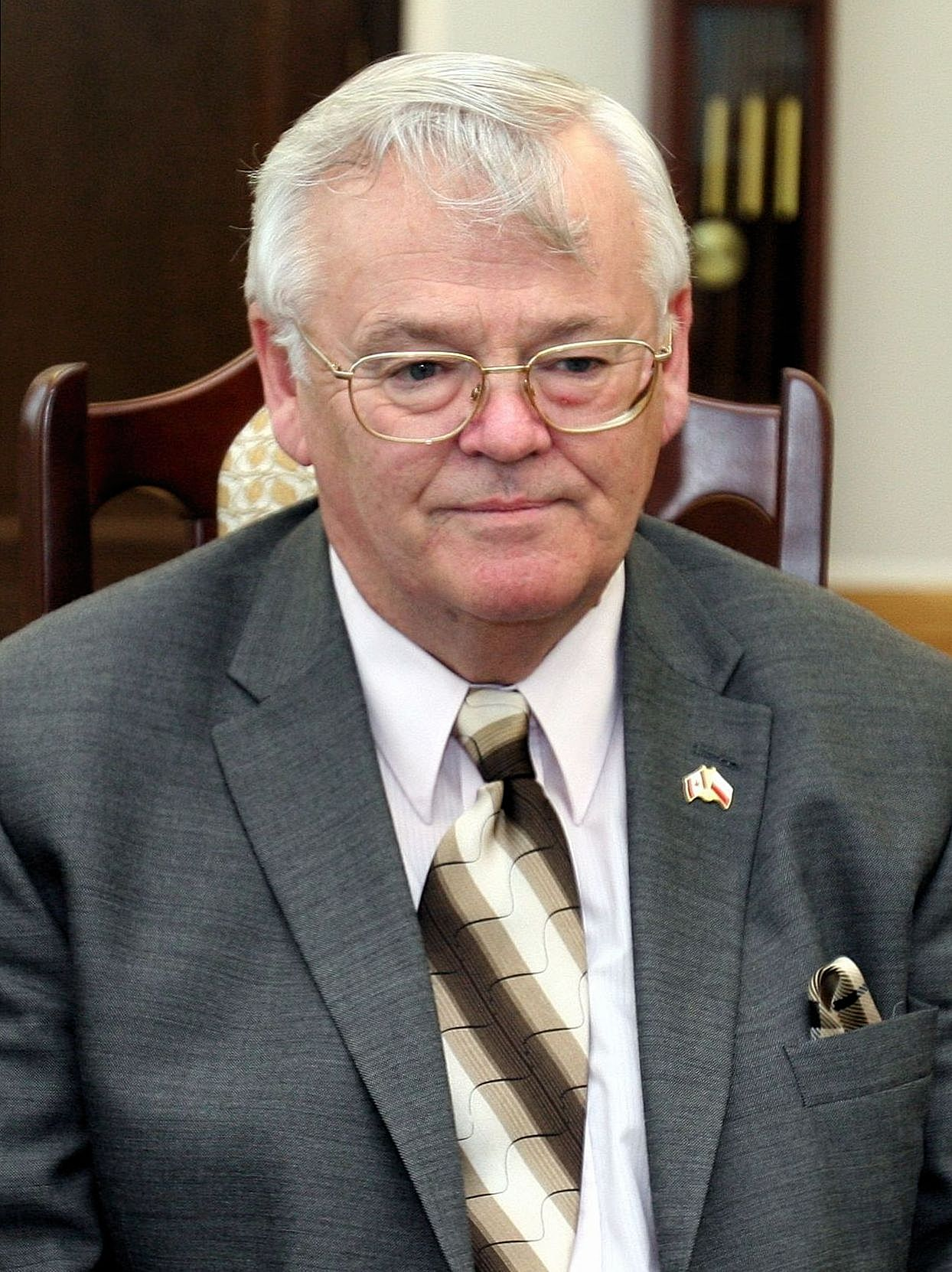
- Kinsella in 2007

Speaker of the Senate
- In office February 8, 2006 – November 26, 2014
- Nominated by: Stephen Harper
- Appointed by: Michaëlle Jean
- Preceded by: Daniel Hays
- Succeeded by: Pierre Claude Nolin

Senator from New Brunswick (Fredericton-York-Sunbury)
- In office September 12, 1990 – November 26, 2014
- Nominated by: Brian Mulroney
- Appointed by: Ray Hnatyshyn

Personal details
- Born: Noël Augustus Kinsella; November 28, 1939 Saint John, New Brunswick, Canada
- Died: December 6, 2023 (aged 84)
- Party: Conservative
- Spouse: Ann Conley Kinsella
- Profession: Professor, public servant

Noël Augustus Kinsella PC CD (November 28, 1939 – December 6, 2023) was a Canadian politician and was speaker of the Senate of Canada from 2006 to 2014.

== Early life and education ==
Noël Augustus Kinsella was born in Saint John, New Brunswick on November 28, 1939. He graduated from St. Malachy's Memorial High School. He earned a Bachelor of Arts in psychology from University College in Dublin, Ireland. He was also an alumnus of the Pontifical University of St. Thomas Aquinas Angelicum in Rome, from which he earned a PhL and then a PhD in 1965 with a dissertation entitled Toward a theory of personality development : a study of the works of Erik H. Erikson. Furthermore, he received an STL and an STD degree from the Pontifical Lateran University in Rome. He was a Professor for 41 years at St. Thomas University and was a member of the Board of Governors. He also served as chair of the Atlantic Human Rights Centre.

== Career ==
Kinsella was appointed to the Senate of Canada on the recommendation of Prime Minister Brian Mulroney on September 12, 1990, as a Senator for New Brunswick. He sat as a member of the Progressive Conservative Party caucus until 2004, when he joined most of the Tory caucus in becoming a Conservative Senator.

Kinsella was Opposition whip from 1994 to 1999 and deputy leader of the Opposition in the Senate from 1999 to 2004. From 2004 to 2006, he was leader of the Opposition in the Senate. On February 8, 2006, he was named Speaker of the Senate by the Governor General, Michaëlle Jean, on the advice of Prime Minister Stephen Harper. Kinsella spoke French, and used it in parliament. He resigned as Speaker on November 26, 2014, in anticipation of his mandatory retirement from the Senate two days later.

Kinsella was considered a Red Tory and supported Peter MacKay in his bid to become leader of the Progressive Conservative Party in 2003.

== Death ==
Kinsella died on December 6, 2023, at the age of 84.

== Honours and awards ==
Kinsella was an honorary Captain of the Royal Canadian Navy since December 2008.

Kinsella was also a knight of the Sovereign Military Order of Malta.

On February 23, 2015, he was sworn in as a Member of the Queen's Privy Council for Canada. This gave him the right to the honorific prefix "The Honourable" and the post-nominal letters "PC" for life.

Ribbon	Description	Notes
	Order of St. John (K.stJ)	2010; Knight of Justice
	Queen Elizabeth II Silver Jubilee Medal	1977; Canadian Version of this Medal
	125th Anniversary of the Confederation of Canada Medal	1992
	Queen Elizabeth II Golden Jubilee Medal	2002; Canadian Version of this Medal
	Queen Elizabeth II Diamond Jubilee Medal	2012; Canadian Version of this Medal
	Canadian Forces' Decoration (CD)	January 2021; 12 Years Service in the Royal Canadian Navy

=== Honorary degrees ===
Honorary degrees

Location	Date	School	Degree	Gave Commencement Address
Republic of Ireland	30 August 2011	University College Dublin	Doctor of Literature (D.Litt)	Yes

Coat of arms of Noël Kinsella
Crest Issuant from a circlet of fleurs-de-lis, fiddleheads and shamrocks Vert, a dove close proper holding in its beak a flame Gules; Escutcheon Argent on a fess between in chief two suns in splendour Gules and in base a lion passant Sable, the Mace of the Senate of Canada Or; Supporters Two white-tailed deer proper each charged on the shoulder with a pomme bearing an open book Argent and standing on a bed of maple leaves Gules; Motto LUCERNA PEDIBUS MEIS VERBUM TUUM (Latin for 'Your word is a lamp unto my feet')

Political offices
Preceded by John Lynch-Staunton	Leader of the Opposition in the Senate of Canada; 2004–2006	Succeeded by Dan Hays
Preceded by Dan Hays	Speaker of the Senate of Canada; 2006–2014	Succeeded by Pierre Claude Nolin
