= Wilbert Keon =

Canadian politician (1935–2019)

The Honourable Wilbert Keon OC OOnt

Canadian Senator from Ontario
- In office September 27, 1990 – May 17, 2010
- Nominated by: Brian Mulroney
- Appointed by: Ray Hnatyshyn

Personal details
- Born: Wilbert Joseph Keon; May 17, 1935 Sheenboro, Quebec, Canada
- Died: April 7, 2019 (aged 83) Ottawa, Ontario, Canada
- Party: Conservative
- Occupation: heart surgeon, researcher

Wilbert Joseph Keon OC OOnt (May 17, 1935 – April 7, 2019) was a Canadian physician. A heart surgeon and researcher by profession, Keon was a longtime Canadian senator.

== Biography ==
Born in Sheenboro, Quebec, Keon received a Bachelor of Science from St. Patrick's College, Carleton University and a Doctor of Medicine from the University of Ottawa.

After a period of studying and teaching at Harvard University in Boston, he returned to Ottawa in 1969. Keon founded the University of Ottawa Heart Institute at the Ottawa Civic Hospital in 1976, acting as its CEO for more than thirty years until his retirement from that job in April 2004. In 1986, he was the first Canadian to implant an artificial heart into a human as a bridge to transplant. Keon retired as a working doctor and resigned from the Ontario College of Physicians and Surgeons in June 2010.

In 1990 Keon was appointed to the Senate by Governor General Ray Hnatyshyn on the advice of Prime Minister Brian Mulroney, where he sat as a Conservative. In 2010, Keon retired from the Senate upon reaching the mandatory retirement age of 75.

Keon married Anne Jennings in 1960. They have three children: Claudia, Ryan, (who ran for the Liberal Party of Canada in the federal riding of Nepean-Carleton,) and Neil. Keon also has a school named after him in Chapeau, Quebec. He died from a suspected heart attack on April 7, 2019, aged 83.

== Controversy ==
On November 25, 1999, Keon was caught in a prostitution sting by an undercover Ottawa police officer. Shortly thereafter, on December 16 of that same year, he resigned as director of the Ottawa Heart Institute.

== Honours ==
- In 1984 he was made an Officer of the Order of Canada.
- He was appointed an Officer of the Order of Malta by Pope John Paul II.
- In 1990, he was appointed to the Order of Ontario.
- In 1994 he was awarded an honorary D.Sc. from Carleton University.
- In 2007, he was inducted into the Canadian Medical Hall of Fame.

== See also ==
- List of Ontario senators.
