= John Lynch-Staunton =

Canadian politician (1930–2012)

The Honourable John Lynch-Staunton

Interim leader of the Conservative Party
- In office December 7, 2003 – March 20, 2004
- Preceded by: Position established
- Succeeded by: Stephen Harper

Leader of the Opposition in the Senate
- In office December 7, 1993 – September 30, 2004
- Prime Minister: Jean Chrétien; Paul Martin
- Preceded by: Royce Frith
- Succeeded by: Noël Kinsella

Canadian Senator from Grandville
- In office September 23, 1990 – June 19, 2005
- Nominated by: Brian Mulroney
- Appointed by: Ray Hnatyshyn
- Preceded by: Léopold Langlois (1988)
- Succeeded by: Andrée Champagne

Montreal City Councillor for Côte-des-Neiges
- In office October 24, 1960 – November 10, 1974
- Preceded by: Multi-member district
- Succeeded by: Nick Auf der Maur

Personal details
- Born: John George Lynch-Staunton; June 19, 1930 Montreal, Quebec, Canada
- Died: August 17, 2012 (aged 82) Pincher Creek, Alberta, Canada
- Party: Conservative
- Other political affiliations: Progressive Conservative
- Spouse: Juliana de Kuyper (m. 1958)
- Children: 5
- Education: Georgetown University (BSc); Queen's University (MA)

John George Lynch-Staunton (June 19, 1930 – August 17, 2012) was a Canadian senator, who served as interim leader of the Conservative Party of Canada, from December 2003 to March 2004. He represented the Senate division of Grandville, Quebec. Lynch-Staunton was the first Senator to lead a federal political party since Arthur Meighen from 1941 to 1942.

== Early years and education ==
Born in Montreal, Quebec, Lynch-Staunton was educated at Collège Stanislas and Collège Jean-de-Brébeuf in Montreal. He obtained a B.Sc in Foreign Service from Georgetown University in Washington, D.C. in 1953, and did graduate work towards a Master of Arts degree in Canadian History at Queen's University, Kingston, Ontario, from 1953 to 1955.

== Family ==
Lynch-Staunton married Juliana de Kuyper in 1958. The couple had five children: Mark (d: 2013), Peter (d: 2015), Gabrielle, Sophie and Sean. Lynch-Staunton has 9 grandchildren: Caitlin, Harrison, Connor, Juliana, Aidan, Jaryd, Monique, Jack, Matthew and Tyce (b: 2016).

== City councillor ==
Lynch-Staunton was elected to the city council of Montreal in 1960. He represented the district of Côte-des-Neiges and was a member of Mayor Jean Drapeau's Parti civique de Montréal. He was re-elected in 1962, 1966 and 1970. Mayor Drapeau appointed him to the executive committee as vice chairman. In 1974 he lost his bid for re-election to Nick Auf der Maur as the Rassemblement des citoyens et citoyennes de Montréal (RCM) achieved its first political breakthrough.

== Provincial politics ==
Lynch-Staunton ran as a Union Nationale candidate for a provincial by-election in the district of Notre-Dame-de-Grâce in 1968. He was defeated by Liberal candidate William Tetley.

== Senator ==
Lynch-Staunton was appointed to the Senate on the recommendation of Prime Minister Brian Mulroney on September 23, 1990. The following year, he was appointed Deputy Leader of the Government in the Senate, and he became Leader of the Opposition in the Senate in December 1993 following the Liberal victory in that year's general election. From December 8, 2003, with the merger of the Canadian Alliance and the Progressive Conservative Party of Canada ratified by both parties, he served as interim leader of the new Conservative Party of Canada until the election of Stephen Harper in March 2004. "Lynch-Staunton's high-road leadership of a Senate majority in opposition to an elected majority government in the Commons is a model for students of Parliament – and for future reference when history repeats itself". He remained Leader of the Opposition in the Senate until September 30, 2004, and retired from Parliament when he reached the mandatory retirement age of 75 on June 19, 2005.

== Retirement ==
Lynch-Staunton won a council seat in Stanstead in the Quebec municipal elections on November 1, 2009.

== Death ==
Lynch-Staunton died on August 17, 2012, following a heart attack while he was at a family reunion in Pincher Creek, Alberta; he was 82 years old.

Parliament of Canada
Preceded by Léopold Langlois	Senator for Grandville; 1990–2005	Succeeded by Andrée Champagne
Government offices
Preceded by Royce Herbert Frith	Leader of the Opposition in the Senate of Canada; 1993–2004	Succeeded by Noël A. Kinsella
Party political offices
Preceded by Party created	Leader of the Conservative Party; Interim; 2003–2004	Succeeded by Stephen Harper
