= Consiglio Di Nino =

Canadian businessman and politician

The Honourable Consiglio Di Nino
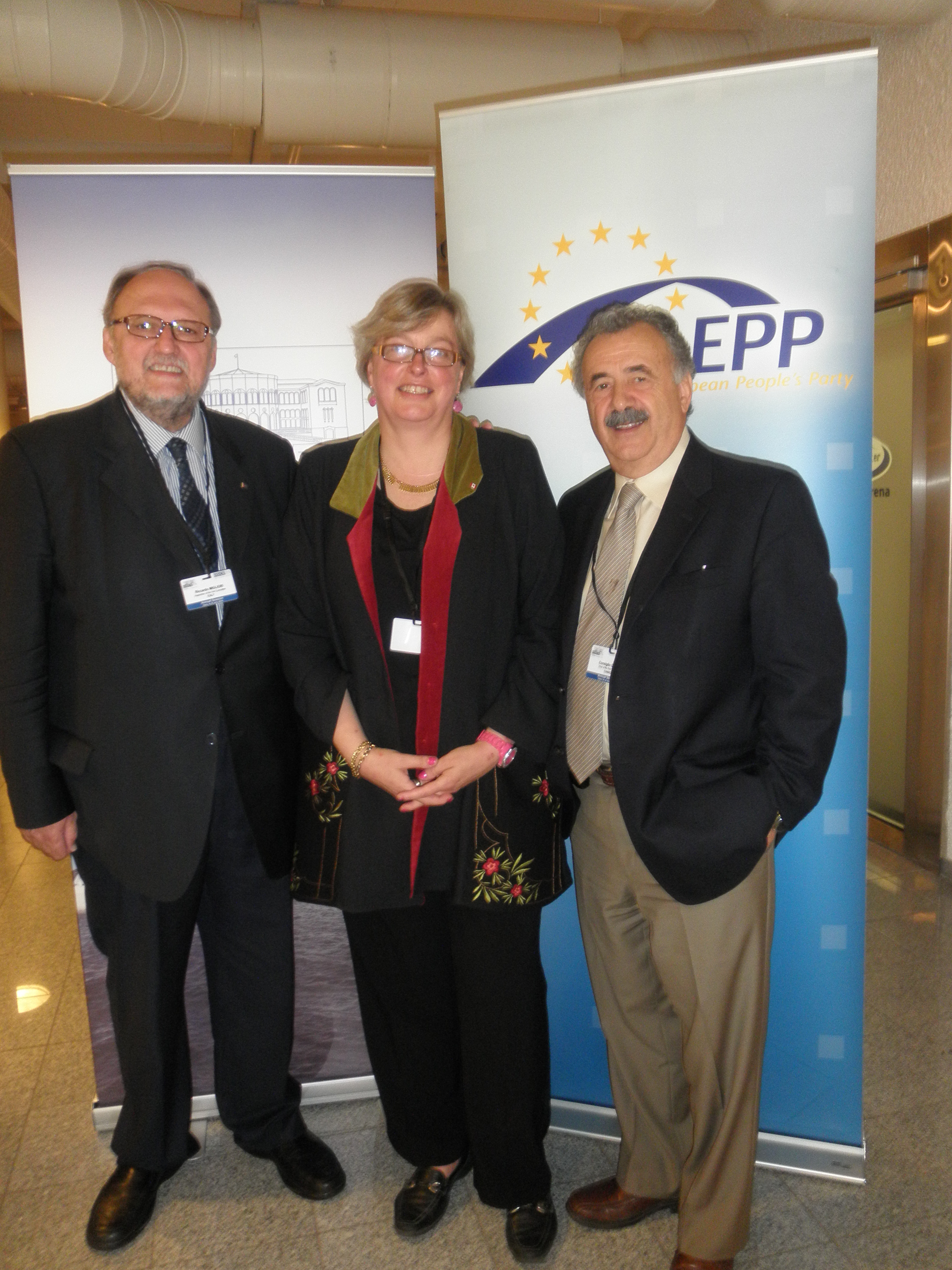
- Ricardo Migliori (left), Walburga Habsburg Douglas (center) and Consiglio Di Nino (right), 2010

Canadian Senator from Ontario
- In office August 30, 1990 – June 30, 2012
- Appointed by: Brian Mulroney

Personal details
- Born: January 24, 1938 (age 88) Italy
- Party: Conservative

Consiglio Di Nino (born January 24, 1938) is an Italian-born Canadian businessman and former Senate of Canada senator from 1990 to 2012.

== Early life and career ==
Born on January 24, 1938, in Italy, Di Nino immigrated to Canada with his family at the end of the Second World War. He attended St Michael's College School in Toronto before going to the University of Toronto and York University.

Beginning as a bank teller in 1955, Di Nino rose to a management position at the Toronto-Dominion Bank and eventually became an executive at Realty Capital Corporation. In 1979, he founded and became CEO of Cabot Trust (which eventually became Cabot Capital Corporation). He left in 1991 to become a consultant in the financial sector.

== Political career ==
In 1990, Di Nino was appointed to the Senate on the recommendation of Prime Minister Brian Mulroney. He sat as a Progressive Conservative until 2004 when he and most of his Tory colleagues joined the Conservative Party of Canada. He served as Government Whip in the Senate from January 1, 2010, to May 24, 2011. He resigned on June 30, 2012, seven months before his mandatory retirement.

He was Canada's top representative to the Organization for Security and Co-operation in Europe in 2009. His work at OSCE took him to Kazakhstan.

Di Nino founded the Canadian Parliamentary Friends of Tibet. He has given a number of speeches and written letters urging a boycott of the People's Republic of China because of its occupation of Tibet.

Di Nino has also been heavily involved in the Italian-Canadian community as past chair of Villa Charities Incorporated (a charity founded by the Italian-Canadian business community), past president of the Canadian Italian Business and Professional Association, Villa Colombo Home for the Aged and the Columbus Centre of Toronto. He also served as president of the Harbourfront Corporation federal agency responsible for Toronto's waterfront.

== See also ==
- List of Ontario senators
