= Terry Stratton =

Canadian politician (1938–2026)

The Honourable Terry Stratton

Canadian Senator from Manitoba
- In office March 25, 1993 – March 16, 2013
- Appointed by: Brian Mulroney
- Succeeded by: Raymonde Gagné

Personal details
- Born: Terrance Richard Stratton; March 16, 1938 Winnipeg, Manitoba, Canada
- Died: February 13, 2026 (aged 87)
- Party: Conservative
- Spouse: Marie Wyatt (m. 1961)
- Children: 3
- Education: University of Manitoba

Terrance Richard Stratton (March 16, 1938 – February 13, 2026) was a Canadian politician. He served in the Senate of Canada, representing Manitoba from March 25, 1993 until March 16, 2013.

== Background ==
Stratton served as Opposition Whip from 2001 until 2004 when he became Deputy Leader of the Opposition in the Senate. When the Conservatives took power in 2006, he was appointed Government Whip in the Senate, serving until December 31, 2009.

Stratton died on February 13, 2026, at the age of 87.
