= 1st Canadian Parliament =

1867–1872 national legislative term

- Majority parliament
- Sep. 24, 1867 – Jul. 8, 1872

Parliament leaders
- Prime minister: Rt. Hon. Sir John A. Macdonald; Jul. 1, 1867 – Nov. 5, 1873
- Cabinet: 1st Canadian Ministry

Party caucuses
- Government: Conservative Party & Liberal-Conservative
- Opposition: Liberal Party
- Crossbench: Anti-Confederation Party

House of Commons
- Seating arrangements of the House of Commons
- Speaker of the Commons: Hon. James Cockburn; November 6, 1867 – March 25, 1874
- Members: 180 MP seats List of members

Senate
- Seating arrangements of the Senate
- Speaker of the Senate: The Hon. Joseph-Édouard Cauchon; November 5, 1867 – June 30, 1872
- Government Senate leader: Alexander Campbell; July 1, 1867 – November 5, 1873
- Opposition Senate leader: Luc Letellier de St-Just; July 1, 1867 – November 5, 1873
- Senators: 72 senator seats List of senators

Sovereign
- Monarch: Victoria; 1 July 1867 – 22 Jan. 1901
- Governor general: The Viscount Monck; 1 July 1867 – 14 Nov. 1868
- Lord Lisgar; 2 Feb. 1869 – 25 June 1872
- The Earl of Dufferin; 25 June 1872 – 25 Nov. 1878

Sessions
- 1st session November 6, 1867 – May 22, 1868
- 2nd session April 15, 1869 – June 22, 1869
- 3rd session February 15, 1870 – May 12, 1870
- 4th session February 15, 1871 – April 14, 1871
- 5th session April 11, 1872 – June 14, 1872
→ 2nd

The 1st Canadian Parliament was summoned in November 1867, following the election of the members of the House of Commons in the 1867 federal election. It lasted until dissolution in 1872, prior to the 1872 election (four years and 252 days). It met in five different sessions from 1867 to 1872, and was prorogued between the sessions.

The House of Commons was controlled by a majority coalition between the Conservative Party and the Liberal-Conservative Party under Prime Minister Sir John A. Macdonald and the 1st Canadian Ministry. The Official Opposition was the Liberal Party, but there was not yet a Leader of the Official Opposition during the 1st Parliament.

James Cockburn, M.P., was the Speaker of the House of Commons for the term of the Parliament. Senator Joseph-Édouard Cauchon was the Speaker of the Senate for the term of the Parliament.

== Creation of the Parliament of Canada ==
=== Confederation ===
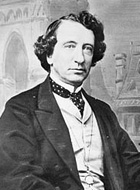
Sir John A. MacDonald, first Prime Minister of Canada

Canada was created on July 1, 1867, when the British North America Act, 1867 (now the Constitution Act, 1867) was brought into force by royal proclamation of Queen Victoria. That was the culmination of Canadian Confederation, which united the Province of Canada, Nova Scotia and New Brunswick into a new federation, with the Province of Canada split into two new provinces, Ontario and Quebec.

The act created a new federal parliament, the Parliament of Canada. It was composed of the monarch, represented by the Governor General of Canada, the appointed Senate, and the elected House of Commons. The Parliament operates on a similar basis as the British Parliament, with the government of Canada headed by the Prime Minister of Canada, who holds office based on controlling a majority in the House of Commons.

Based on the political situation leading up to July 1, 1867, it was generally expected that John A. Macdonald, one of the co-premiers of the Province of Canada, would be the first prime minister of Canada. This was confirmed by Governor General Viscount Monck, who appointed Macdonald as prime minister in May 1867. Macdonald then appointed the cabinet ministers for the new federal government, which took office on July 1, in the run-up to the first elections for the House of Commons, which occurred in August and September, 1867.

=== House of Commons ===
The seats in the House of Commons were allocated to the four provinces, based on population: Ontario had 82 seats, Quebec had 65, Nova Scotia had 19, and New Brunswick had 15. Most of the electoral districts, also called ridings, were single-member districts, but there were some multi-member districts. Voting was done by open ballots, with members elected on a first-past-the-post system.

In the first general elections in 1867, Macdonald's supporters, an informal coalition of Conservatives and Liberal-Conservatives, won a majority of the seats in the House of Commons, confirming him and the cabinet in office. The Parliament was then summoned for November 7, 1867.

=== Senate ===
The Senate is an appointed body, not elected. Seats are allocated on regional representation, not provincial equality.

The Senate in 1867 was composed of three divisions: the Ontario, Quebec and the Maritime divisions. Each division had twenty-four seats, for a total of seventy-two seats in all. The seats of the Maritime division were allocated equally between New Brunswick and Nova Scotia, with twelve senators from each of those provinces.

The proclamation of Confederation on May 22 had named the 72 men (24 each for Quebec and Ontario, 12 each for New Brunswick and Nova Scotia) who would sit in the Senate.

The province of Quebec has 24 Senate divisions which are constitutionally mandated. In all other provinces, a Senate division is strictly an optional designation of the senator's own choosing, and has no real constitutional or legal standing. A senator who does not choose a special senate division is designated a senator for the province at large.

== Addition of Manitoba, British Columbia, and the North-West Territories ==
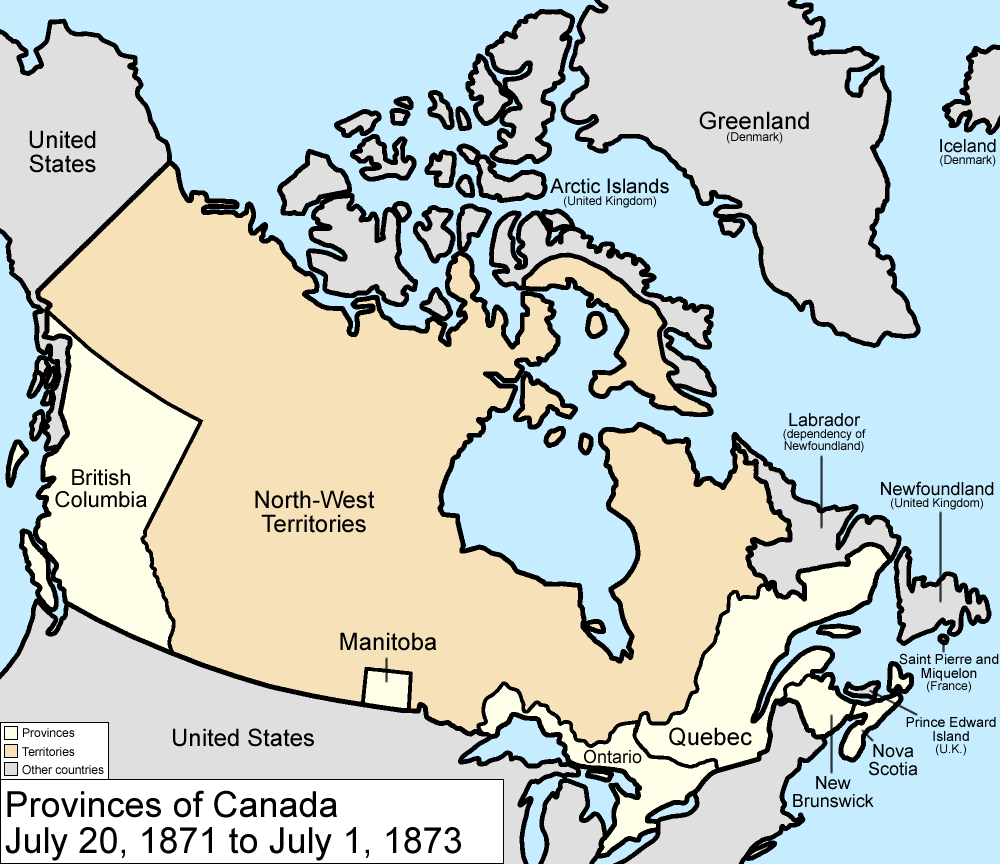
Map of Canada in 1871

Canada expanded westward during the term of the first Parliament, with the addition of the provinces of Manitoba and British Columbia. That resulted in the expansion of both the House of Commons and the Senate.

On July 15, 1870, Canada acquired Rupert's Land and the North-Western Territory. That same date, Parliament created the province of Manitoba, a small province centred on Winnipeg. Manitoba was the fifth Canadian province and was allotted two seats in the Senate and four in the House of Commons. By-elections were held to elect the four Manitoba MPs in March 1871. Three members were elected because a tie was declared in one riding (Marquette). The outcome of the disputed election was not resolved prior to the 1872 election so neither candidate took the seat in the House of Commons. With the two added Manitoba Senate seats, the number of seats in the Senate rose to 74. Manitoba's Senate seats were filled in December 13, 1871, when Governor General Lord Lisgar, on the advice of Prime Minister Macdonald, filled the seats.

On July 20, 1871, British Columbia became the sixth Canadian province and was allotted six seats in the House of Commons (elected in by-elections in November and December 1871) and three seats in the Senate, bringing the total number of seats in the Senate to 77. On December 13, 1871, Lord Lisgar, on the advice of Macdonald, appointed three persons to fill those seats.

Also on July 15, 1870, the federal Parliament created the North-West Territories, which included all of Rupert's Land and the North-Western Territory (other than Manitoba). The North-West Territories did not receive any representation in the House of Commons or the Senate until 1886.

== Throne speeches of the first Parliament ==
Each new session of the Canadian Parliament opens with the Throne Speech from the Governor General. Although delivered by the governor general, the throne speech is drafted by the government and sets out the legislative agenda of the government for the upcoming session.

=== 1867: First Session ===
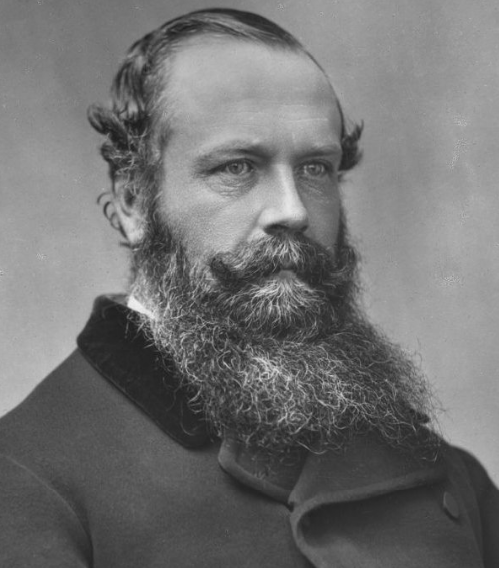
Governor General Monck, who summoned the 1st Parliament after the federal election in 1867

Governor General Monck opened the first Parliament with the throne speech on November 7, 1867.

Monck commented on the enactment of the British North America Act, 1867, stating that while passed by the Imperial Parliament, it had been the product of careful negotiations between the British government and the delegates of the British North American provinces. While the British government saw the creation of the new country as advantageous to the Empire, the provincial delegates had been given every freedom in the design of the new constitution. He trusted that the new country would soon extend from the Atlantic to the Pacific.

He stated that it now fell to the representatives of the people of Canada to create the institutions and laws necessary to put into practice the principles set out in the constitution. He stated that some of the objectives for the government in the upcoming session would be:

- financial matters, such as currency, customs, excise, and federal revenue generally;
- the adoption of a uniform postal system;
- management and maintenance of federal public works and properties;
- militia organization and defence;
- administration of Indian affairs;
- uniform laws respecting patents of invention and discovery;
- naturalization of aliens;
- criminal law;
- laws relating to bankruptcy and insolvency.

Monck also stated a proposal would be introduced for the immediate construction of the Intercolonial Railway, as required by the constitution, and assisted by the financial guarantee given by the British government. Measures would also be introduced for the protection of fisheries and marine interests, as well as uniform laws regarding federal elections.

He also specifically advised the members of the House of Commons that the financial needs for operation of the government since July 1 had been undertaken on the authority of the ministers, who would account to the House of Commons for their expenditures during that period.

=== 1869: Second Session ===
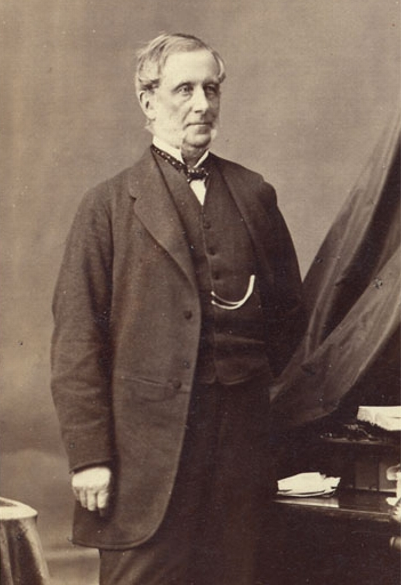
Sir John Young, Bt. (later Lord Lisgar), governor general of Canada, 1869–1872

Flag of the Hudson's Bay Company, which controlled Rupert's Land and the North-Western Territory prior to 1870

The second session of the Parliament opened on April 15, 1869. The throne speech was given by the new Governor General, Sir John Young.

The governor general commented that the federal government, the Hudson's Bay Company and the Colonial Secretary had been engaged in negotiations for the HBC to surrender Rupert's Land and the North-Western Territory to Canada, and that the transfer seemed likely. He also announced that the governor of Newfoundland had communicated with him on the possibility of admitting Newfoundland into Confederation. He mentioned that with the assistance of the British government, measures had been undertaken to resolve Nova Scotia's objections to aspects of the new federal system.

He announced that bills would be introduced in the session for the following purposes:

- the assimilation of provincial criminal laws into federal criminal law;
- uniform federal elections law;
- uniform bankruptcy and insolvency law;
- uniform laws relating to patents of invention and discovery.

He also mentioned that the charters of several banks would be up for renewal, which would be a very important measure for the sound commerce of the country.

=== 1870: Third Session ===
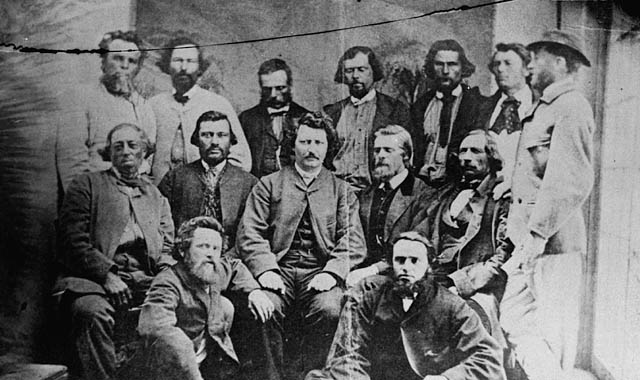
Provisional government of Assiniboia in the North-West Territories, June 1870

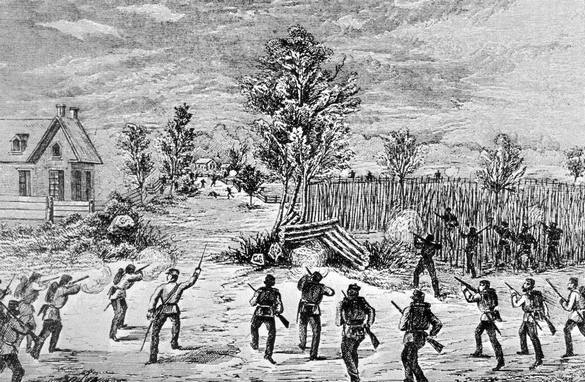
Battle of Eccles Hill, Quebec, to repel Fenian raiders, May 1870

The third session opened on February 15, 1870, with a throne speech by the governor general, Sir John Young.

After complimentary opening remarks about the economy, the governor general commented on the political unrest in the North-West Territories, which he attributed to misapprehensions about the intentions of the Canadian government in acquiring the territory. He stated that the government had responded with conciliation measures, which he hoped would lead to a peaceful and equitable settlement of the difficulties and the incorporation of the North-West Territories into Canada. He advised that since the existing act for the temporary government of the North-West Territories was due to expire, a new measure would be introduced in the session.

The governor general then mentioned several other proposed bills for the session, to deal with:

- banking regulation, to balance the financial security of Canadians with the business structures of the banks;
- a uniform electoral franchise and federal election laws;
- regulation of the local coasting trade, failing which an Imperial statute would apply;
- creation of a federal court of appeal, which would also have some original jurisdiction;
- a uniform census law, to meet the constitutional requirement for a census in 1871, which would be important for the readjustment of seats in the House of Commons. He hoped that similar rules could be adopted for censuses in Newfoundland and Prince Edward Island, to assist in uniform data tables.

The governor general noted with satisfaction the strong turn-out by the militia, ready to repeal the threat of Fenian raids. He also commented on the attempts made by the provinces to encourage immigration and the improvement of public works.

He closed by referring to his visits to all the provinces, including his role in welcoming Prince Arthur on his visit to Canada. He was happy to report to the Imperial government the general satisfaction that Canadians in all parts of the country had with their ability to create their own institutions, governed by their own laws.

=== 4th Session ===
On Wednesday February 15, 1871. The 4th session of the 1st parliament of the Dominion of Canada opened with a speech from the throne by the governor general, John Young (The Lord Lisgar).

In the speech, he highlights the menace of invasion from the United States. He also celebrates the creation of the province of Manitoba and looks forward to the same from British Columbia. On that topic, he speaks on the importance of the interoceanic railway to be created. He encourages more immigration to these new territories. He recommends the swift standardization of currency to not fall into the divisiveness seen in Europe. He says the census will occur on April 3, 1871. He briefly touches on some future bills pertaining to Parliamentary Elections, Weights and Measures, Insurance Companies, Savings Banks, and for the Consolidation and amendment of the Inspection Laws.

=== 5th Session ===
On Thursday April 11, 1872. The 5th session of the 1st parliament of the Dominion of Canada opened with a speech from the throne by the governor general, John Young (The Lord Lisgar).

In the speech, he highlights the threat of invasion of Manitoba from the United States. He remarks on a conference held in Ottawa in September 1871 on the subject of immigration. He recognizes the adoption of British Columbia into the union and the continuation of the railway project. He encourages the development of canals and a direct water communication between the Gulf of St. Lawrence and the Bay of Fundy. He notes that the census has taken place. He briefly mentions future bills pertaining to Judges of Superior Courts-to the regulation and management of the Public Lands and Mines of the Dominion in Manitoba and the North West Territories, aid for the amendment of the laws relating to the Public Health.

== Party standings at opening of Parliament, 1867 ==
Although there were changes to the House of Commons and the Senate during the term of the 1st Parliament, due to by-elections and new appointments to the Senate, Prime Minister Macdonald and the 1st Canadian ministry retained their majorities in both chambers throughout.

=== House of Commons ===
Seats in the House of Commons by party and province
Party	New Brunswick	Nova Scotia	Ontario	Quebec	Totals
Conservative	1	1	33	36	71
Liberal-Conservative	2	0	16	11	29
Liberal	12	0	33	17	62
Anti-Confederation	0	18	0	0	18
Vacant	0	0	0	1	1
Totals:	15	19	82	65	181

=== Senate ===
Seats in the Senate by party and Senate division
Party	Ontario	Quebec	Maritime	Totals
Conservative	13	15	10	38
Liberal-Conservative	1	1	4	6
Liberal	10	8	8	26
Vacant	0	0	2	2
Totals:	24	24	24	72

==== Maritime Senate seats by province ====
Seats in the Maritime division by province
Party	New Brunswick	Nova Scotia	Totals
Conservative	5	5	10
Liberal-Conservative	1	3	4
Liberal	4	4	8
Vacant	2	0	2
Totals:	24	24	24

== House of Commons ==
Following is a full list of members of the House of Commons in the first Parliament, organised by province,

John A. Macdonald was the Prime Minister of Canada throughout the term of the 1st Parliament, and appointed the members of the federal Cabinet.

James Cockburn, MP for Northumberland West in Ontario, was the speaker for the term of the 1st Parliament.

Although the Liberal Party formed the Official Opposition, the party did not yet have a leader, so there was no Leader of the Official Opposition.

Key:

- Party leaders are italicized.
- Cabinet ministers are in **boldface**.
- The Prime Minister is **both**.
- The Speaker is indicated by "(†)".

Electoral districts denoted by an asterisk (*) indicates that district was represented by two members.

=== Members elected in 1867 ===
==== New Brunswick ====
Electoral district	Name	Party	First elected	No. of terms
Albert	John Wallace	Liberal	1867	1st term
Carleton	Charles Connell	Liberal	1867	1st term
Charlotte	John Bolton	Liberal	1867	1st term
City and County of Saint John	John Hamilton Gray	Conservative	1867	1st term
City of Saint John	**Samuel Leonard Tilley**	Liberal-Conservative	1867	1st term
Gloucester	Timothy Warren Anglin	Liberal	1867	1st term
Kent	Auguste Renaud	Liberal	1867	1st term
King's	George Ryan	Liberal	1867	1st term
Northumberland	John Mercer Johnson (to September 8, 1868) (death)	Liberal	1867	1st term
Northumberland	Richard Hutchison (from December 24, 1868)	Liberal	1868	1st term
Queen's	John Ferris	Liberal	1867	1st term
Restigouche	John McMillan (to February 15, 1868) (appointed Inspector of Post Offices)	Liberal	1867	1st term
Restigouche	William Murray Caldwell (from March 13, 1868, to September 29, 1870) (death)	Liberal	1868	1st term
Restigouche	George Moffat (from November 29, 1870)	Conservative	1870	1st term
Sunbury	Charles Burpee	Liberal	1867	1st term
Victoria	John Costigan	Liberal-Conservative	1867	1st term
Westmorland	Albert James Smith	Liberal	1867	1st term
York	Charles Fisher (to October 3, 1868) (appointed to the Supreme Court of New Brunswick)	Liberal	1867	1st term
York	John Pickard (from October 28, 1868)	Independent Liberal	1868	1st term

==== Nova Scotia ====
Electoral district	Name	Party	First elected	No. of terms
Annapolis	William Hallett Ray	Anti-Confederate	1867	1st term
Annapolis	William Hallett Ray	Liberal^{1}	1867	1st term
Antigonish	Hugh McDonald	Anti-Confederate	1867	1st term
Antigonish	Hugh McDonald	Liberal-Conservative^{1}	1867	1st term
Cape Breton	James Charles McKeagney	Anti-Confederate	1867	1st term
Cape Breton	James Charles McKeagney	Liberal-Conservative^{1}	1867	1st term
Colchester	Archibald McLelan (to June 21, 1869) (appointed to Senate)	Anti-Confederate	1867	1st term
Colchester	Archibald McLelan (to June 21, 1869) (appointed to Senate)	Liberal-Conservative^{1}	1867	1st term
Colchester	**Adams George Archibald** (from September 9, 1869, to May 19, 1870) (named Lieutenant-Governor of Manitoba and the Northwest Territories)	Liberal-Conservative	1869	1st term
Colchester	Frederick M. Pearson (from November 8, 1870)	Liberal	1870	1st term
Cumberland	**Charles Tupper**	Conservative	1867	1st term
Digby	Alfred William Savary	Anti-Confederate	1867	1st term
Digby	Alfred William Savary	Conservative^{1}	1867	1st term
Guysborough	Stewart Campbell	Anti-Confederate	1867	1st term
Guysborough	Stewart Campbell	Liberal-Conservative^{1}	1867	1st term
Halifax*	Alfred Gilpin Jones	Anti-Confederate	1867	1st term
Halifax*	Alfred Gilpin Jones	Independent	1867	1st term
Halifax*	Patrick Power	Anti-Confederate	1867	1st term
Halifax*	Patrick Power	Liberal^{1}	1867	1st term
Hants	**Joseph Howe**	Anti-Confederate	1867	1st term
Hants	**Joseph Howe**	Liberal-Conservative^{1}	1867	1st term
Inverness	Hugh Cameron	Anti-Confederate	1867	1st term
Inverness	Hugh Cameron	Liberal-Conservative^{1}	1867	1st term
Kings	William Henry Chipman to (April 9, 1870) (death)	Anti-Confederate	1867	1st term
Kings	William Henry Chipman to (April 9, 1870) (death)	Liberal^{1}	1867	1st term
Kings	Leverett de Veber Chipman (from June 23, 1870)	Liberal	1870	1st term
Lunenburg	Edmund Mortimer McDonald	Anti-Confederate	1867	1st term
Lunenburg	Edmund Mortimer McDonald	Liberal-Conservative^{1}	1867	1st term
Pictou	James William Carmichael	Anti-Confederate	1867	1st term
Pictou	James William Carmichael	Liberal^{1}	1867	1st term
Queens	James Fraser Forbes	Anti-Confederate	1867	1st term
Queens	James Fraser Forbes	Liberal^{1}	1867	1st term
Richmond	William Croke (to March 11, 1869) (death)	Anti-Confederate	1867	1st term
Richmond	William Croke (to March 11, 1869) (death)	Conservative^{1}	1867	1st term
Richmond	Isaac Le Vesconte (from April 20, 1869)	Conservative^{1}	1869	1st term
Shelburne	Thomas Coffin	Anti-Confederate	1867	1st term
Shelburne	Thomas Coffin	Liberal-Conservative^{1}	1867	1st term
Victoria	William Ross	Anti-Confederate	1867	1st term
Victoria	William Ross	Liberal^{1}	1867	1st term
Yarmouth	Thomas Killam (to December 15, 1868) (death)	Anti-Confederate	1867	1st term
Yarmouth	Frank Killam (from April 20, 1869)	Liberal	1868	1st term

Note:

^{1} – The Anti-Confederate Party dissolved after failing to secure Nova Scotia's secession from Confederation. In 1869 its members joined other parties, or in one case sat as an independent.

==== Ontario ====
Electoral district	Name	Party	First elected	No. of terms
Addington	James Lapum	Conservative	1867	1st term
Algoma	Wemyss Mackenzie Simpson (to April 26, 1871) (appointed Indian Commissioner for Rupert's Land)	Conservative	1867	1st term
Algoma	Frederick William Cumberland (from June 30, 1871)	Conservative	1871	1st term
Bothwell	David Mills	Liberal	1867	1st term
Brant North	John Young Bown	Liberal-Conservative	1867	1st term
Brant South	Edmund Burke Wood	Liberal	1867	1st term
Brockville	James Crawford	Conservative	1867	1st term
Bruce North	Alexander Sproat	Conservative	1867	1st term
Bruce South	Francis Hurdon	Conservative	1867	1st term
Cardwell	Thomas Roberts Ferguson	Conservative	1867	1st term
Carleton	John Holmes	Liberal-Conservative	1867	1st term
Cornwall	John Sandfield Macdonald	Liberal	1867	1st term
Dundas	John Sylvester Ross	Liberal-Conservative	1867	1st term
Durham East	Francis H. Burton	Conservative	1867	1st term
Durham West	Edward Blake	Liberal	1867	1st term
Elgin East	Thomas William Dobbie	Conservative	1867	1st term
Elgin West	John H. Munroe	Conservative	1867	1st term
Essex	**John O'Connor**	Conservative	1867	1st term
Frontenac	Thomas Kirkpatrick (to March 26, 1870) (death)	Conservative	1867	1st term
Frontenac	George Airey Kirkpatrick (from April 27, 1870)	Conservative	1870	1st term
Glengarry	Donald Alexander Macdonald	Liberal	1867	1st term
Grenville South	Walter Shanly	Conservative	1867	1st term
Grey North	George Snider	Liberal	1867	1st term
Grey South	George Jackson	Conservative	1867	1st term
Haldimand	David Thompson	Liberal	1867	1st term
Halton	John White	Liberal	1867	1st term
Hamilton	Charles Magill	Liberal	1867	1st term
Hastings East	Robert Read (to February 24, 1871) (appointed to Senate)	Conservative	1867	1st term
Hastings East	John White (from March 20, 1871)	Conservative	1871	1st term
Hastings North	Mackenzie Bowell	Conservative	1867	1st term
Hastings West	James Brown	Conservative	1867	1st term
Huron North	Joseph Whitehead	Liberal	1867	1st term
Huron South	Malcolm Colin Cameron	Liberal	1867	1st term
Kent	Rufus Stephenson	Conservative	1867	1st term
Kingston	The Right Honourable Sir **John A. Macdonald**, Prime Minister of Canada	Liberal-Conservative	1867	1st term
Lambton	Alexander Mackenzie	Liberal	1867	1st term
Lanark North	**William C.B. McDougall**	Liberal-Conservative	1867	1st term
Lanark South	**Alexander Morris**^{6}	Conservative	1867	1st term
Leeds North and Grenville North	Francis Jones	Conservative	1867	1st term
Leeds South	John Willoughby Crawford	Conservative	1867	1st term
Lennox	Richard John Cartwright	Conservative	1867	1st term
Lennox	Richard John Cartwright	Liberal	1867	1st term
Lincoln	James Rea Benson (to March 14, 1868) (appointed to the Senate)	Liberal-Conservative	1867	1st term
Lincoln	Thomas Rodman Merritt (from April 13, 1868)	Liberal	1868	1st term
London	John Carling	Liberal-Conservative	1867	1st term
Middlesex East	Crowell Willson	Liberal-Conservative	1867	1st term
Middlesex North	Thomas Scatcherd	Liberal	1867	1st term
Middlesex West	Angus Peter McDonald	Conservative	1867	1st term
Monck	Lachlin McCallum	Liberal-Conservative	1867	1st term
Niagara	Angus Morrison	Conservative	1867	1st term
Norfolk North	Aquila Walsh	Conservative	1867	1st term
Norfolk South	Peter Lawson	Liberal	1867	1st term
Northumberland East	Joseph Keeler	Liberal-Conservative	1867	1st term
Northumberland West	James Cockburn (†)	Conservative	1867	1st term
Ontario North	John Hall Thompson	Liberal	1867	1st term
Ontario South	Thomas Nicholson Gibbs	Liberal-Conservative	1867	1st term
Ottawa (City of)	Joseph Merrill Currier	Liberal-Conservative	1867	1st term
Oxford North	Thomas Oliver	Liberal	1867	1st term
Oxford South	Ebenezer Vining Bodwell	Liberal	1867	1st term
Peel	John Hillyard Cameron	Conservative	1867	1st term
Perth North	James Redford	Liberal	1867	1st term
Perth South	Robert MacFarlane	Liberal	1867	1st term
Peterborough East	Peregrine Maitland Grover	Conservative	1867	1st term
Peterborough West	Charles Perry	Conservative	1867	1st term
Prescott	Albert Hagar	Liberal	1867	1st term
Prince Edward	Walter Ross	Liberal	1867	1st term
Renfrew North	John Rankin (to October 12, 1869) (resigned)	Conservative	1867	1st term
Renfrew North	**Francis Hincks** (from November 13, 1869)	Liberal-Conservative	1869	1st term
Renfrew South	Daniel McLachlin (to June 3, 1869) (resigned)	Liberal	1867	1st term
Renfrew South	John Lorn McDougall (from July 12, 1869)	Liberal	1869	1st term
Russell	James Alexander Grant	Conservative	1867	1st term
Simcoe North	Thomas David McConkey	Liberal	1867	1st term
Simcoe South	William Carruthers Little	Liberal-Conservative	1867	1st term
Stormont	Samuel Ault	Liberal-Conservative	1867	1st term
Toronto East	James Beaty	Conservative	1867	1st term
Toronto West	Robert Alexander Harrison	Conservative	1867	1st term
Victoria North	John Morison	Liberal	1867	1st term
Victoria South	George Kempt	Liberal	1867	1st term
Waterloo North	Isaac Erb Bowman	Liberal	1867	1st term
Waterloo South	James Young	Liberal	1867	1st term
Welland	Thomas Clark Street	Conservative	1867	1st term
Wellington Centre	Thomas Sutherland Parker (to October 24, 1868) (death)	Liberal	1867	1st term
Wellington Centre	James Ross (from January 18, 1869)	Liberal	1869	1st term
Wellington North	George Alexander Drew	Liberal-Conservative	1867	1st term
Wellington South	David Stirton	Liberal	1867	1st term
Wentworth North	James McMonies	Liberal	1867	1st term
Wentworth South	Joseph Rymal	Liberal	1867	1st term
York East	James Metcalfe	Liberal	1867	1st term
York North	James Pearson Wells	Liberal	1867	1st term
York West	**William Pearce Howland** (to July 14, 1868) (appointed Lieutenant Governor of Ontario)	Liberal-Conservative	1867	1st term
York West	Amos Wright (from August 14, 1868)	Liberal	1867	1st term

Note:

^{6} – One Ontario MP, Alexander Morris, recontested his seat in a byelection. He was reelected in Lanark South on November 29, 1869, after being appointed Minister of Inland Revenue.

==== Quebec ====
Electoral district	Name	Party	First elected	No. of terms
Argenteuil	John Abbott	Liberal-Conservative	1867	1st term
Bagot	Pierre-Samuel Gendron	Conservative	1867	1st term
Beauce	Christian Pozer	Liberal	1867	1st term
Beauharnois	Michael Cayley	Conservative	1867	1st term
Bellechasse	Louis Napoléon Casault (to May 26, 1870) (appointed to Superior Court of Quebec)	Conservative	1867	1st term
Bellechasse	Télesphore Fournier (from August 15, 1870)	Liberal	1870	1st term
Berthier	Anselme Pâquet	Liberal	1867	1st term
Bonaventure	Théodore Robitaille	Conservative	1867	1st term
Brome	**Christopher Dunkin**^{4} (to October 24, 1871) (appointed to Superior Court of Quebec)	Conservative	1867	1st term
Brome	Edward Carter (from November 17, 1871)	Conservative	1871	1st term
Chambly	Pierre Benoit	Conservative	1867	1st term
Champlain	John Jones Ross	Conservative	1867	1st term
Charlevoix	Simon Xavier Cimon	Conservative	1867	1st term
Châteauguay	Luther Holton	Liberal	1867	1st term
Chicoutimi—Saguenay	Pierre Alexis Tremblay	Liberal	1867	1st term
Compton	**John Henry Pope**^{5}	Liberal-Conservative	1867	1st term
Dorchester	**Hector-Louis Langevin**	Conservative	1867	1st term
Drummond—Arthabaska	Louis Adélard Sénécal	Conservative	1867	1st term
Gaspé	Pierre Fortin	Conservative	1867	1st term
Hochelaga	Antoine Dorion	Liberal	1867	1st term
Huntingdon	**John Rose**^{2} (to September 29, 1869) (resigned)	Liberal-Conservative	1867	1st term
Huntingdon	Julius Scriver (from October 30, 1869)	Liberal	1869	1st term
Iberville	François Béchard	Liberal	1867	1st term
Jacques Cartier	Guillaume Gaucher	Conservative	1867	1st term
Joliette	François Benjamin Godin	Liberal	1867	1st term
Kamouraska	no election in 1867 due to rioting			
Kamouraska	Charles Pelletier (from February 17, 1869)	Liberal	1869	1st term
Laprairie	Alfred Pinsonneault	Conservative	1867	1st term
L'Assomption	Louis Archambeault	Liberal-Conservative	1867	1st term
Laval	Joseph Bellerose	Conservative	1867	1st term
Lévis	Joseph Blanchet	Liberal-Conservative	1867	1st term
L'Islet	Barthélemy Pouliot^{3}	Conservative	1867	1st term
Lotbinière	Henri Joly De Lotbinière	Liberal	1867	1st term
Maskinongé	George Caron	Conservative	1867	1st term
Mégantic	George Irvine	Conservative	1867	1st term
Missisquoi	Brown Chamberlin (to June 6, 1870) (resigned to become Queen's Printer)	Conservative	1867	1st term
Missisquoi	George Baker (from July 5, 1870)	Liberal-Conservative	1870	1st term
Montcalm	Joseph Dufresne (to July 13, 1871) (resigned)	Conservative	1867	1st term
Montcalm	Firmin Dugas (from September 15, 1871)	Conservative	1871	1st term
Montmagny	Joseph-Octave Beaubien	Conservative	1867	1st term
Montmorency	Joseph-Édouard Cauchon (to November 1, 1867)	Conservative	1867	1st term
Montmorency	Jean Langlois (from December 11, 1867)	Conservative	1867	1st term
Montreal Centre	Thomas Workman	Liberal	1867	1st term
Montreal East	**George-Étienne Cartier**	Liberal-Conservative	1867	1st term
Montreal West	Thomas D'Arcy McGee (to April 7, 1868) (assassinated)	Liberal-Conservative	1867	1st term
Montreal West	Michael Patrick Ryan (from April 20, 1868)	Liberal-Conservative	1868	1st term
Napierville	Sixte Coupal dit la Reine	Liberal	1867	1st term
Nicolet	Joseph Gaudet	Conservative	1867	1st term
Ottawa (County of)	Alonzo Wright	Liberal-Conservative	1867	1st term
Pontiac	Edmund Heath	Conservative	1867	1st term
Portneuf	Jean Brousseau	Conservative	1867	1st term
Quebec-Centre	Georges-Honoré Simard	Conservative	1867	1st term
Quebec County	Pierre-Joseph-Olivier Chauveau	Conservative	1867	1st term
Quebec East	Pierre Huot (to June 14, 1870) (resigned to become Postmaster of Quebec)	Liberal	1867	1st term
Quebec East	Adolphe Guillet dit Tourangeau (from July 18, 1870)	Conservative	1870	1st term
Quebec West	Thomas McGreevy	Liberal-Conservative	1867	1st term
Richelieu	Thomas McCarthy (to September 23, 1870) (death)	Conservative	1867	1st term
Richelieu	Georges Isidore Barthe (from November 18, 1870)	Independent Conservative	1870	1st term
Richmond—Wolfe	William Hoste Webb	Conservative	1867	1st term
Rimouski	George Sylvain	Conservative	1867	1st term
Rouville	Guillaume Cheval dit St-Jacques	Liberal	1867	1st term
Saint Maurice	Louis Léon Lesieur Desaulniers (to September 29, 1868) (resigned)	Conservative	1867	1st term
Saint Maurice	Élie Lacerte (from October 30, 1868)	Conservative	1868	1st term
Shefford	Lucius Huntington	Liberal	1867	1st term
Town of Sherbrooke	**Alexander Galt**	Liberal-Conservative	1867	1st term
Soulanges	Luc Masson	Conservative	1867	1st term
St. Hyacinthe	Alexandre Kierzkowski (to August 4, 1870) (death)	Liberal	1867	1st term
St. Hyacinthe	Louis Delorme (from September 1, 1870)	Liberal	1870	1st term
St. John's	François Bourassa	Liberal	1867	1st term
Stanstead	Charles Colby	Liberal-Conservative	1867	1st term
Témiscouata	Charles Bertrand	Conservative	1867	1st term
Terrebonne	Louis Masson	Conservative	1867	1st term
Three Rivers	Louis Boucher De Niverville (to September 30, 1868) (resigned)	Conservative	1867	1st term
Three Rivers	William McDougall (from October 17, 1868)	Conservative	1868	1st term
Two Mountains	Jean-Baptiste Daoust	Conservative	1867	1st term
Vaudreuil	Donald McMillan	Conservative	1867	1st term
Verchères	Félix Geoffrion	Liberal	1867	1st term
Yamaska	Moïse Fortier	Liberal	1867	1st term

Four Quebec members recontested their seats in byelections, and were re-elected:

^{2} – John Rose was reelected in Huntingdon on November 28, 1867, after being named Minister of Finance.

^{3} – Barthélemy Pouliot was unseated on petition, but was reelected in L'Islet on July 14, 1869.

^{4} – Christopher Dunkin was reelected in Brome on November 29, 1869, after being named Minister of Agriculture.

^{5} – John Henry Pope was reelected in Compton on November 11, 1871, after being named Minister of Agriculture following Dunkin's resignation from Parliament.

==== Manitoba ====
Manitoba joined Confederation in 1870. Byelections to choose Manitoba's representatives were held on March 2 and March 3, 1871.

Electoral district	Name	Party	First elected	No. of terms
Lisgar	John Christian Schultz (from March 2, 1871)	Conservative	1871	1st term
Marquette* (both candidates declared elected due to a tie)	James S. Lynch (from March 2, 1871)	Liberal	1871	1st term
Marquette* (both candidates declared elected due to a tie)	Angus McKay (from March 2, 1871)	Conservative	1871	1st term
Selkirk	Donald Alexander Smith (from March 2, 1871)	Independent Conservative	1871	1st term
Provencher	Pierre Delorme (from March 3, 1871)	Conservative	1871	1st term

==== British Columbia ====
British Columbia joined Confederation in 1871. Byelections to choose the province's MPs were held in November and December of that year.

Electoral district	Name	Party	First elected	No. of terms
Cariboo District	Joshua Spencer Thompson (from December 19, 1871)	Liberal-Conservative	1871	1st term
New Westminster District	Hugh Nelson (from December 13, 1871)	Liberal-Conservative	1871	1st term
Vancouver	Robert Wallace (from December 15, 1871)	Conservative	1871	1st term
Victoria*	Amor De Cosmos (from November 24, 1871)	Liberal	1871	1st term
Victoria*	Henry Nathan, Jr. (from November 24, 1871)	Liberal	1871	1st term
Yale District	Charles Frederick Houghton (from December 19, 1871)	Liberal	1871	1st term

- Victoria was a two-seat riding.

== Senate ==
=== Senators summoned to the 1st Parliament ===
Following is a full list of members of the Senate in the first Parliament, organised by senatorial division. Senator Joseph-Édouard Cauchon was the speaker of the Senate during the 1st Parliament, except for nine days in 1869 and two days in 1872. Names of senators who were members of the federal Cabinet are italicised.

==== Ontario Division ====
Name	Party	Appointed by	On advice of	Date appointed	Term ended
**James Cox Aikins**	Liberal-Conservative	Royal Proclamation	Macdonald and Belleau	October 23, 1867	August 6, 1904 (Note: Died in office.)
George William Allan	Conservative	Royal Proclamation	Macdonald and Belleau	October 23, 1867	July 24, 1901
Oliver Blake	Liberal	Royal Proclamation	Macdonald and Belleau	October 23, 1867	December 10, 1873
Asa Burnham	Conservative	Royal Proclamation	Macdonald and Belleau	October 23, 1867	May 10, 1873
**Alexander Campbell**	Conservative	Royal Proclamation	Macdonald and Belleau	October 23, 1867	February 7, 1887 (Note: Resigned on appointment as Lieutenant Governor of Ontario.)
David Christie	Liberal	Royal Proclamation	Macdonald and Belleau	October 23, 1867	December 14, 1880
George Crawford	Conservative	Royal Proclamation	Macdonald and Belleau	October 23, 1867	July 4, 1870
Walter Dickson	Conservative	Royal Proclamation	Macdonald and Belleau	October 23, 1867	February 14, 1884 (Note: Disqualified. Failed to attend Senate for two consecutive sessions of Parliament.)
**Adam Fergusson Blair**	Liberal	Royal Proclamation	Macdonald and Belleau	October 23, 1867	December 29, 1867
Billa Flint	Liberal	Royal Proclamation	Macdonald and Belleau	October 23, 1867	June 15, 1894
John Hamilton	Conservative	Royal Proclamation	Macdonald and Belleau	October 23, 1867	October 10, 1882
Elijah Leonard	Liberal	Royal Proclamation	Macdonald and Belleau	October 23, 1867	May 14, 1891
David Macpherson	Conservative	Royal Proclamation	Macdonald and Belleau	October 23, 1867	August 16, 1896
Roderick Matheson	Conservative	Royal Proclamation	Macdonald and Belleau	October 23, 1867	January 13, 1873
Walter McCrea	Liberal	Royal Proclamation	Macdonald and Belleau	October 23, 1867	January 5, 1871 (Note: Resigned on appointment to the District Court of Algoma.)
Donald McDonald	Liberal	Royal Proclamation	Macdonald and Belleau	October 23, 1867	January 20, 1879
William McMaster	Liberal	Royal Proclamation	Macdonald and Belleau	October 23, 1867	September 22, 1887
Samuel Mills	Conservative	Royal Proclamation	Macdonald and Belleau	October 23, 1867	January 24, 1874
David Reesor	Liberal	Royal Proclamation	Macdonald and Belleau	October 23, 1867	January 1, 1901 (Note: Resigned from Senate.)
John Ross	Conservative	Royal Proclamation	Macdonald and Belleau	October 23, 1867	January 31, 1871
Benjamin Seymour	Conservative	Royal Proclamation	Macdonald and Belleau	October 23, 1867	March 23, 1880
James Shaw	Conservative	Royal Proclamation	Macdonald and Belleau	October 23, 1867	February 6, 1878
John Simpson	Liberal	Royal Proclamation	Macdonald and Belleau	October 23, 1867	March 21, 1885
James Skead	Conservative	Royal Proclamation	Macdonald and Belleau	October 23, 1867	July 5, 1884

==== Quebec Division ====
Name	Party	Quebec Senate division	Appointed by	On advice of	Date appointed	Term ended
Joseph Armand	Conservative	Repentigny	Royal Proclamation	Belleau and Macdonald	October 23, 1867	January 1, 1903
Narcisse Belleau	Conservative	Stadacona	Royal Proclamation	Belleau and Macdonald	October 23, 1867	October 23, 1867 (Note: Resigned on appointment as Lieutenant Governor of Quebec.)
Joseph-Noël Bossé	Conservative	De la Durantaye	Royal Proclamation	Belleau and Macdonald	October 23, 1867	January 23, 1868 (Note: Resigned on appointment to Superior Court of Quebec.)
Jacques-Olivier Bureau	Liberal	De Lorimier	Royal Proclamation	Belleau and Macdonald	October 23, 1867	February 7, 1883
William Henry Chaffers	Liberal	Rougemont	Royal Proclamation	Belleau and Macdonald	October 23, 1867	July 19, 1894
Charles Cormier	Liberal	Kennebec	Royal Proclamation	Belleau and Macdonald	October 23, 1867	May 7, 1887
Antoine Juchereau Duchesnay	Conservative	La Salle	Royal Proclamation	Belleau and Macdonald	October 23, 1867	January 7, 1871
Elzéar H.J. Duchesnay	Conservative	Lauzon	Royal Proclamation	Belleau and Macdonald	October 23, 1867	May 12, 1871
Léandre Dumouchel	Conservative	Mille Isles	Royal Proclamation	Belleau and Macdonald	October 23, 1867	September 24, 1882
James Ferrier	Conservative	Shawinigan	Royal Proclamation	Belleau and Macdonald	October 23, 1867	May 30, 1888
Asa Foster	Conservative	Bedford	Royal Proclamation	Belleau and Macdonald	October 23, 1867	February 10, 1876 (Note: Resigned on bankruptcy.)
Jean-Baptiste Guévremont	Conservative	Saurel	Royal Proclamation	Belleau and Macdonald	October 23, 1867	June 14, 1896
John Hamilton	Conservative	Inkerman	Royal Proclamation	Belleau and Macdonald	October 23, 1867	May 5, 1887
Louis Lacoste	Conservative	Montarville	Royal Proclamation	Belleau and Macdonald	October 23, 1867	November 26, 1878
James Leslie	Conservative	Alma	Royal Proclamation	Belleau and Macdonald	October 23, 1867	December 6, 1873
Luc Letellier de St-Just	Liberal	Grandville	Royal Proclamation	Belleau and Macdonald	October 23, 1867	December 14, 1876
Charles Malhiot	Liberal	De la Vallière	Royal Proclamation	Belleau and Macdonald	October 23, 1867	November 9, 1874
Louis Auguste Olivier	Liberal	De Lanaudière	Royal Proclamation	Belleau and Macdonald	October 23, 1867	September 8, 1873
David Edward Price	Conservative	The Laurentides	Royal Proclamation	Belleau and Macdonald	October 23, 1867	August 3, 1883
Louis Renaud	Conservative	De Salaberry	Royal Proclamation	Belleau and Macdonald	October 23, 1867	October 30, 1873
Thomas Ryan	Liberal-Conservative	Victoria	Royal Proclamation	Belleau and Macdonald	October 23, 1867	May 25, 1889
John Sanborn	Liberal	Wellington	Royal Proclamation	Belleau and Macdonald	October 23, 1867	October 12, 1872
Ulric Tessier	Liberal	Gulf	Royal Proclamation	Belleau and Macdonald	October 23, 1867	February 11, 1873
Charles Wilson	Conservative	Rigaud	Royal Proclamation	Belleau and Macdonald	October 23, 1867	May 4, 1877

==== Maritime Division ====
Name	Party	Province	Appointed by	On advice of	Date appointed	Term ended
John Anderson	Liberal	Nova Scotia	Royal Proclamation	Tupper	October 23, 1867	December 24, 1870
Thomas Archibald	Liberal-Conservative	Nova Scotia	Royal Proclamation	Tupper	October 23, 1867	October 18, 1890
Caleb Bill	Liberal-Conservative	Nova Scotia	Royal Proclamation	Tupper	October 23, 1867	February 1, 1872
Amos Botsford	Conservative	New Brunswick	Royal Proclamation	Mitchell	October 23, 1867	March 18, 1894
John Bourinot	Liberal-Conservative	Nova Scotia	Royal Proclamation	Tupper	October 23, 1867	January 19, 1884
Robert Dickey	Conservative	Nova Scotia	Royal Proclamation	Tupper	October 23, 1867	July 14, 1903
John Ferguson	Conservative	New Brunswick	Royal Proclamation	Mitchell	October 23, 1867	August 21, 1888
Robert Hazen	Conservative	New Brunswick	Royal Proclamation	Mitchell	October 23, 1867	August 15, 1874
John Holmes	Conservative	Nova Scotia	Royal Proclamation	Tupper	October 23, 1867	June 3, 1876
**Edward Kenny**	Conservative	Nova Scotia	Royal Proclamation	Tupper	October 23, 1867	April 11, 1876
John Locke	Liberal	Nova Scotia	Royal Proclamation	Tupper	October 23, 1867	December 12, 1873
Abner McClelan	Liberal	New Brunswick	Royal Proclamation	Mitchell	October 23, 1867	December 9, 1896 (Note: Resigned on appointment as Lieutenant Governor of New Brunswick.)
Jonathan McCully	Liberal	Nova Scotia	Royal Proclamation	Tupper	October 23, 1867	September 28, 1870 (Note: Resigned on appointment to the Supreme Court of Nova Scotia.)
William Miller	Liberal-Conservative	Nova Scotia	Royal Proclamation	Tupper	October 23, 1867	February 23, 1912
**Peter Mitchell**	Liberal-Conservative	New Brunswick	Royal Proclamation	Mitchell	October 23, 1867	July 13, 1872 (Note: Resigned from Senate to stand for election to the House of Commons.)
William Odell	Conservative	New Brunswick	Royal Proclamation	Mitchell	October 23, 1867	July 25, 1891
John Ritchie	Conservative	Nova Scotia	Royal Proclamation	Tupper	October 23, 1867	September 28, 1870
John Robertson	Liberal	New Brunswick	Royal Proclamation	Mitchell	October 23, 1867	August 3, 1876
William Steeves	Liberal	New Brunswick	Royal Proclamation	Mitchell	October 23, 1867	December 9, 1873
David Wark	Liberal	New Brunswick	Royal Proclamation	Mitchell	October 23, 1867	August 20, 1905
Benjamin Wier	Liberal	Nova Scotia	Royal Proclamation	Tupper	October 23, 1867	April 14, 1868
Robert Wilmot	Conservative	New Brunswick	Royal Proclamation	Mitchell	October 23, 1867	February 10, 1880

=== Senators appointed during the 1st Parliament ===
Name	Party	Province (Division)	Date appointed	Appointed by	On the Advice of	Left office	Reason
Joseph-Édouard Cauchon	Independent Conservative	Quebec (Stadacona)	November 2, 1867	Viscount Monck	Macdonald	June 30, 1872	Resignation
**Jean-Charles Chapais**	Conservative	Quebec (De la Durantaye)	January 30, 1868	Viscount Monck	Macdonald		
James Rea Benson	Liberal-Conservative	Ontario	March 14, 1868	Viscount Monck	Macdonald		
James Dever	Liberal	New Brunswick	March 14, 1868	Viscount Monck	Macdonald		
John Glasier	Liberal	New Brunswick	March 14, 1868	Viscount Monck	Macdonald		
Archibald McLelan	Liberal-Conservative	Nova Scotia	June 21, 1869	Baron Lisgar	Macdonald		
Alexander Macfarlane	Conservative	Nova Scotia	October 10, 1870	Baron Lisgar	Macdonald		
Jeremiah Northup	Liberal	Nova Scotia	October 10, 1870	Baron Lisgar	Macdonald		
Ebenezer Perry	Conservative	Ontario	February 2, 1871	Baron Lisgar	Macdonald		
Frank Smith	Conservative	Ontario	February 2, 1871	Baron Lisgar	Macdonald		
Ezra Churchill	Liberal-Conservative	Nova Scotia	February 3, 2871	Baron Lisgar	Macdonald		
Louis Panet	Conservative	Quebec (La Salle)	February 10, 1871	Baron Lisgar	Macdonald		
Robert Read	Conservative	Ontario	February 24, 1871	Baron Lisgar	Macdonald		
Robert William Weir Carrall	Conservative	British Columbia	December 13, 1871	Baron Lisgar	Macdonald		
Clement Francis Cornwall	Conservative	British Columbia	December 13, 1871	Baron Lisgar	Macdonald		
Alexandre-René Chaussegros de Léry	Conservative	Quebec (Lauzon)	December 13, 1871	Baron Lisgar	Macdonald		
Marc-Amable Girard	Conservative	Manitoba	December 13, 1871	Baron Lisgar	Macdonald		
William John Macdonald	Conservative	British Columbia	December 13, 1871	Baron Lisgar	Macdonald		
John Sutherland	Independent Conservative	Manitoba	December 13, 1871	Baron Lisgar	Macdonald		
Henry Adolphus Newman Kaulback	Conservative	Nova Scotia	March 27, 1872	Baron Lisgar	Macdonald		

- Senators in bold were cabinet ministers during the 1st Parliament

== Parliamentary term and sessions ==
Parliament & Session	General Election Dates	Return of the Writs	Opening Date	Last Sitting Day	Prorogation	Dissolution
1st Parliament	August 7 to September 20, 1867	September 24, 1867	—	-	-	July 8, 1872
1st Session	—	—	November 6, 1867	May 22, 1868	May 22, 1868	—
2nd Session	—	—	April 15, 1869	June 22, 1869	June 22, 1869	—
3rd Session	—	—	February 15, 1870	May 12, 1870	May 12, 1870	—
4th Session	—	—	February 15, 1871	April 14, 1871	April 14, 1871	—
5th Session	—	—	April 11, 1872	June 14, 1872	June 14, 1872	—
Source: House of Commons Procedure and Practice

== Pre-Confederation predecessors ==
Colony	Assembly
Province of Canada	8th Parliament
Nova Scotia	22nd General Assembly
New Brunswick	21st Legislative Assembly
Red River Colony	Legislative Assembly of Assiniboia
Colony of British Columbia	Legislative Council of British Columbia

== By-elections to fill casual vacancies in the 1st Canadian Parliament ==
(This list does not include byelections held to fill new seats in Manitoba and British Columbia, as shown above)

== New Brunswick ==
Date	Riding	Incumbent	Party	Elected	Party	Reason for by-election
March 13, 1868	Restigouche	John McMillan	Liberal	William Murray Caldwell	Liberal	McMillan appointed Inspector of Post Offices in New Brunswick, February 15, 1868
October 28, 1868	York	Charles Fisher	Liberal	John Pickard	Independent Liberal	Fisher appointed to New Brunswick Supreme Court, October 3, 1868
December 24, 1868	Northumberland	John Mercer Johnson	Liberal	Richard Hutchison	Liberal	Johnson's death, November 8, 1868
November 29, 1870	Restigouche	William Murray Caldwell	Liberal	George Moffat, Sr.	Conservative	Caldwell appointed inspector of post offices in New Brunswick, September 29, 1870

=== Nova Scotia ===
Date	Riding	Incumbent	Party	Elected	Party	Reason for by-election
April 20, 1869	Richmond	William Joseph Croke	Anti-Confederate	Isaac LeVesconte	Conservative	Croke's death, March 11, 1869
April 20, 1869	Yarmouth	Thomas Killam	Anti-Confederate	Frank Killam	Liberal	Thomas Killam's death, December 15, 1868
April 24, 1869	Hants	Joseph Howe	Anti-Confederate	Joseph Howe	Liberal-Conservative	Ministerial by-election upon Howe's appointment as President of the Privy Council, January 30, 1869
September 9, 1869	Colchester	Archibald McLelan	Anti-Confederate	Adams George Archibald	Liberal-Conservative	McLelan called to the Senate, June 21, 1869
June 15, 1870	Cumberland	Charles Tupper	Conservative	Charles Tupper	Conservative	Ministerial by-election upon Tupper's appointment as President of the Privy Council
June 23, 1870	Kings	William Henry Chipman	Anti-Confederate	Leverett de Veber Chipman	Liberal	William Chipman's death, April 10, 1870
November 8, 1870	Colchester	Adams George Archibald	Liberal-Conservative	Frederick M. Pearson	Liberal	Archibald appointed Lieutenant-Governor of Manitoba and Lieutenant Governor of the North-West Territories, May 20, 1870

== Ontario ==
Date	Riding	Incumbent	Party	Elected	Party	Reason for by-election
April 13, 1868	Lincoln	James Rea Benson	Liberal-Conservative	Thomas Rodman Merritt	Liberal	Benson called to the Senate, March 14, 1868
August 14, 1868	York West	William Pearce Howland	Liberal-Conservative	Amos Wright	Liberal	Howland appointed Lieutenant-Governor of Ontario, July 15, 1868
July 12, 1869	Wellington Centre	Thomas Sutherland Parker	Liberal	James Ross	Liberal	Parker's death, October 24, 1868
November 13, 1869	Renfrew North	John Rankin	Liberal-Conservative	Francis Hincks	Conservative	Rankin resigned to provide a seat for Hincks, October 12, 1869
November 29, 1869	Renfrew South	Daniel McLachlin	Liberal	John Lorn McDougall	Liberal	McLachlin resigned June 3, 1869, taking retirement
November 29, 1869	Lanark South	Alexander Morris	Conservative	Alexander Morris	Conservative	Ministerial by-election upon Morris's appointment as Minister of Inland Revenue, November 15, 1869
April 27, 1870	Frontenac	Thomas Kirkpatrick	Conservative	George Airey Kirkpatrick	Conservative	Kirkpatrick's death, March 26, 1870
March 20, 1871	Hastings East	Robert Read	Conservative	John White	Conservative	Read called to the Senate, February 24, 1871
June 30, 1871	Algoma	Wemyss Mackenzie Simpson	Conservative	Frederick William Cumberland	Conservative	Simpson appointed Indian Commissioner for Rupert's Land, April 26, 1871

== Quebec ==
Date	Riding	Incumbent	Party	Elected	Party	Reason for by-election
November 28, 1867	Huntingdon	Sir John Rose	Liberal-Conservative	Sir John Rose	Liberal-Conservative	Ministerial by-election upon Rose's appointment as Minister of Finance, November 18, 1867
December 11, 1867	Montmorency	Joseph-Édouard Cauchon	Conservative	Jean Langlois	Conservative	Cauchon called to the Senate, November 2, 1867
April 20, 1868	Montreal West	Thomas D'Arcy McGee	Liberal-Conservative	Michael Patrick Ryan	Liberal-Conservative	McGee assassinated, April 7, 1868
October 17, 1868	Three Rivers	Louis-Charles Boucher de Niverville	Conservative	William McDougall	Conservative	Boucher de Niverville appointed sheriff for the district of Trois-Rivières, September 30, 1868
October 30, 1868	Saint Maurice	Louis-Léon Lesieur Desaulniers	Conservative	Élie Lacerte	Conservative	Desaulniers appointed inspector of prisons and asylums in Quebec, September 29, 1868
February 17, 1869	Kamouraska	Vacant		Charles Alphonse Pantaléon Pelletier	Liberal	No election held in 1867 due to riots
July 14, 1869	L'Islet	Barthélemy Pouliot	Conservative	Barthélemy Pouliot	Conservative	Previous election annulled, June 9, 1869
October 30, 1869	Huntingdon	Sir John Rose	Liberal-Conservative	Julius Scriver	Liberal	Rose resigned September 29, 1869 and moved to London where he acted as the government's representative to the UK.
November 29, 1869	Brome	Christopher Dunkin	Conservative	Christopher Dunkin	Conservative	Ministerial by-election upon Dunkin's appointment as Minister of Agriculture, November 15, 1869
July 5, 1870	Missisquoi	Brown Chamberlin	Conservative	George Barnard Baker	Liberal-Conservative	Chamberlin resigned on appointment as Queen's Printer, June 6, 1870
July 18, 1870	Quebec East	Pierre-Gabriel Huot	Liberal	Adolphe Guillet dit Tourangeau	Conservative	Huot resigned on appointment as postmaster at Quebec, June 14, 1870
August 15, 1870	Bellechasse	Louis-Napoléon Casault	Conservative	Télesphore Fournier	Liberal	Casault resigned on appointment to the Superior Court of Quebec, May 26, 1870
September 1, 1870	St. Hyacinthe	Alexandre-Édouard Kierzkowski	Liberal	Louis Delorme	Liberal	Kierzkowski's death, August 4, 1870
November 18, 1870	Richelieu	Thomas McCarthy	Conservative	Georges Isidore Barthe	Independent Conservative	McCarthy's death, September 23, 1870
September 15, 1871	Montcalm	Joseph Dufresne	Conservative	Firmin Dugas	Conservative	Dufresne was appointed Sheriff of Saint-Jean County, July 13, 1871
November 11, 1871	Compton	John Henry Pope	Conservative	John Henry Pope	Conservative	Ministerial by-election upon appointment as Minister of Agriculture, October 25, 1871
November 17, 1871	Brome	Christopher Dunkin	Conservative	Edward Carter	Conservative	Dunkin resigned on appointment to the Superior Court of Quebec, October 24, 1871

== See also ==
- List of current Canadian senators

== Works cited ==
- Government of Canada. "1st Parliament". Members of the House of Commons: 1867 to Date: By Parliament. Library of Parliament. Archived from the original on 2006-12-20.
- Government of Canada. "1st Parliament". Senators: 1867 to Date: By Parliament. Library of Parliament.
- Government of Canada. "The Canadian Ministry in order of precedence (Current)". Canadian Ministry (Cabinet). Library of Parliament. Archived from the original on April 9, 2010.
