= Section 25 of the Constitution Act, 1867 =

Provision of the Constitution of Canada

British North America Act, 1867

Section 25 of the Constitution Act, 1867 (French: article 25 de la Loi constitutionnelle de 1867) is a repealed provision of the Constitution of Canada relating to the appointment of the first members of the Senate of Canada in 1867.

The Constitution Act, 1867 is the constitutional statute which established Canada. Originally named the British North America Act, 1867, the Act continues to be the foundational statute for the Constitution of Canada, although it has been amended many times since 1867. It is now recognised as part of the supreme law of Canada.

== Constitution Act, 1867 ==
The Constitution Act, 1867 is part of the Constitution of Canada and thus part of the supreme law of Canada. The Act sets out the constitutional framework of Canada, including the structure of the federal government and the powers of the federal government and the provinces. It was the product of extensive negotiations between the provinces of British North America at the Charlottetown Conference in 1864, the Quebec Conference in 1864, and the London Conference in 1866. Those conferences were followed by consultations with the British government in 1867. The Act was then enacted in 1867 by the British Parliament under the name the British North America Act, 1867. In 1982 the Act was brought under full Canadian control through the Patriation of the Constitution, and was renamed the Constitution Act, 1867. Since Patriation the Act can only be amended in Canada, under the amending formula set out in the Constitution Act, 1982.

== Text of section 25 ==
Section 25 read:

Summons of First Body of Senators
25 Such Persons shall be first summoned to the Senate as the Queen by Warrant under Her Majesty's Royal Sign Manual thinks fit to approve, and their Names shall be inserted in the Queen's Proclamation of Union.

Section 25 was found in Part IV of the Constitution Act, 1867, dealing with the legislative power of the federal government. It was repealed in 1893 as part of a general statute law revision.

== Purpose and interpretation ==
The Senate of Canada is the upper house of the Parliament of Canada. Its members are appointed, not elected. Section 25 was the initial step to provide for the appointment of the first group of senators for the new Parliament of Canada in 1867. The list of nominees for the Senate was put forward by the governments of the Province of Canada, Nova Scotia and New Brunswick, approved by the Queen, and then set out in the royal proclamation which brought the Constitution Act, 1867 came into force on July 1, 1867.

Section 127 of the Act provided the mechanism for offers of Senate positions to be made to incumbent members of the provincial legislative councils.

== Legislative history ==
=== Origins ===
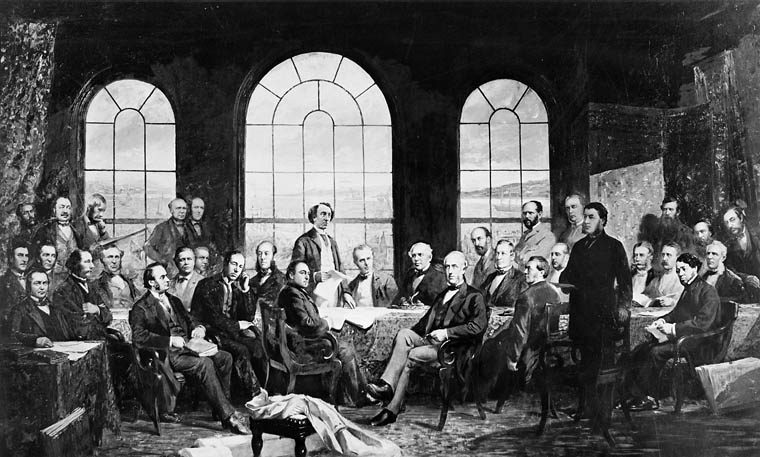
The Quebec Conference, 1864

Prior to Confederation, the Province of Canada, New Brunswick and Nova Scotia all had bicameral parliaments, with the upper houses termed the legislative councils. The Fathers of Confederation agreed in the Quebec Resolutions that the first senators in the new Parliament of Canada would be nominated by the provincial governments. The seats would be offered to current members of the provincial legislative councils, in proportion to the representation of the government and opposition members in each legislative council, so that "all political parties may as nearly as possible be fairly represented."

The London Conference confirmed that approach in the London Resolutions, which finalised the agreement for Confederation.

This principle of proportionate political representation was not expressly included in the Act itself, but was implemented in the initial appointments to the Senate, which were largely drawn from the provincial legislative councils.

=== Drafts of section 25 ===
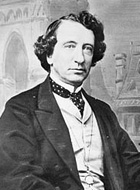
John A. Macdonald, who did not want the names of the new senators be included in the Proclamation

Section 25, setting out the method for the appointment of the initial group of senators, went through a number of drafts in the lead-up to the introduction of the bill in the British Parliament:

- The earliest rough draft of the bill proposed that the executive governments of each of the provinces would nominate individuals who were members of the legislative councils, and the governor general would appoint those individuals;
- The next draft proposed that the first senators would be named in a schedule to the bill;
- The third and fourth drafts proposed that prior to the first meeting of Parliament, the Governor General could summon to the Senate "such persons as Her Majesty may think fit";
- The final draft provided that the first group would be summoned, after the Queen's approval, signified under the royal sign manual.

At some point between the final draft bill on February 7, 1867 and its introduction in Parliament on February 12, section 25 took its final form, with the addition of the words "... and their names shall be inserted in the Queen's proclamation of union." The decision to list the new senators in the Proclamation was apparently at the insistence of the British government, over the opposition of John A. Macdonald, the future prime minister of Canada. Macdonald had a very pragmatic reason for his opposition, as explained in a letter to the Colonial Secretary, Lord Carnarvon: "... if the list were settled now, every man ... who is omitted, rightly or wrongly, would vote against the government." Nonetheless, the decision of the British government stood.

=== Repeal ===
Section 25 was repealed by the British Parliament in 1893, in the Statute Law Revision Act 1893. The law was of a housekeeping nature, repealing statutory provisions which no longer had any purpose. Since the initial senators had been appointed in 1867, section 25 was no longer needed.

There is no indication that the British government consulted the government of Canada about the amendment.

== Appointment of the first senators ==
=== Summons by the Governor General ===
Following the proclamation of the Act on July 1, 1867, the next step was to appoint the nominees listed in the proclamation. This step was done by the Governor General of Canada, who summoned each of the individuals named in the proclamation to the Senate. This step was done by a combination of letters patent (dated October 29, 1867) and individual writs of summons under section 24 of the Act.

=== First senators ===
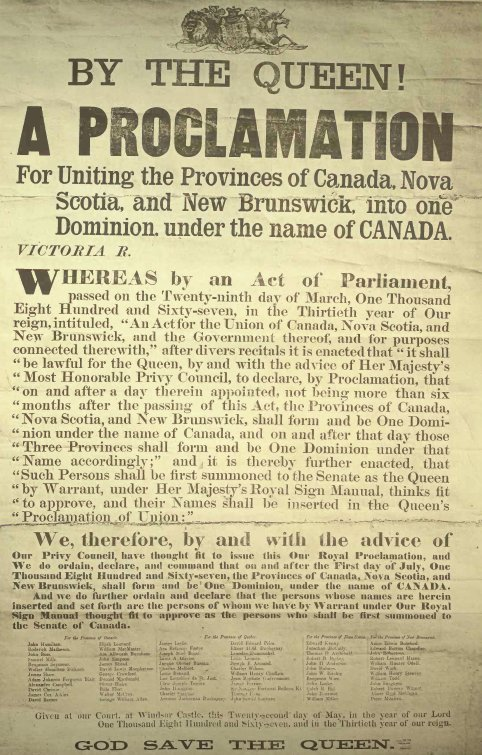
Royal proclamation, naming the individuals to be summoned to the Senate

The following were the senators nominated under section 25. They were all named in the Royal Proclamation, and then appointed by individual summons under section 24.

Prior to Confederation, the Legislative Council of the Province of Canada was composed of 48 members, 24 from Canada East and 24 from Canada West. All of the members of the Legislative Council as of 1867 were named in the list in the Royal Proclamation.

The majority of the senators appointed from New Brunswick and Nova Scotia were from the legislative councils of those two provinces, but some of the appointments were members of the legislative assemblies. Members of the legislative councils of New Brunswick and Nova Scotia who accepted a senate position automatically gave up their position in the legislative council, as provided by section 127 of the Act.

Three nominees declined the position:

- Sir Narcisse Fortunat Belleau of Quebec, who instead was appointed the first Lieutenant Governor of Quebec on July 1, 1867;
- Edward Barron Chandler of New Brunswick, who declined based on his advanced age and disinclination to seek a new public office; and
- William Todd of New Brunswick, who declined as he did not wish to move to Ottawa.

=== Ontario ===
| Name | Political party |
|---|---|
| Aikins, James Cox | Liberal-Conservative |
| Allan, George William | Conservative |
| Blair, Adam Johnston Ferguson | Liberal |
| Blake, Oliver | Liberal |
| Burnham, Asa Allworth | Conservative |
| Campbell, Alexander | Conservative |
| Christie, David | Liberal |
| Crawford, George | Conservative |
| Dickson, Walter Hamilton | Conservative |
| Flint, Billa | Liberal |
| Hamilton, John | Conservative |
| Leonard, Elijah | Liberal |
| McCrea, Walter | Liberal |
| McDonald, Donald | Liberal |
| Macpherson, David Lewis | Conservative |
| McMaster, William | Liberal |
| Matheson, Roderick | Conservative |
| Mills, Samuel | Conservative |
| Reesor, David | Liberal |
| Ross, John | Conservative |
| Seymour, Benjamin | Conservative |
| Shaw, James | Conservative |
| Simpson, John | Liberal |
| Skead, James | Conservative |

=== Quebec ===
| Name | Political party |
|---|---|
| Armand, Joseph-François | Conservative |
| Belleau, Narcisse Fortunat (Note: Declined appointment) | Conservative |
| Bossé, Joseph-Noël | Conservative |
| Bureau, Jacques-Olivier | Liberal |
| Chaffers, William Henry | Liberal |
| Cormier, Charles | Nationalist Liberal |
| Duchesnay, Antoine Juchereau | Conservative |
| Duchesnay, Elzear-Henri Jucereau | Conservative |
| Dumouchel, Léandre | Conservative |
| Ferrier, James | Conservative |
| Foster, Asa Belknap | Conservative |
| Guévremont, Jean Baptiste | Conservative |
| Hamilton, John | Conservative |
| Lacoste, Louis | Conservative |
| Leslie, James | Conservative |
| Letellier de St-Just, Luc | Liberal |
| Malhiot, Charles-Christophe | Liberal |
| Olivier, Louis Auguste | Liberal |
| Price, David Edward | Conservative |
| Renaud, Louis | Conservative |
| Ryan, Thomas | Liberal-Conservative Party |
| Sanborn, John Sewell | Liberal |
| Tessier, Ulric-Joseph | Liberal |
| Wilson, Charles | Conservative |

=== Nova Scotia ===
| Name | Political party |
|---|---|
| Anderson, John Hawkins | Liberal |
| Bill, Caleb Rand (Note: Member of Legislative Assembly at time of appointment) | Liberal-Conservative |
| Bourinot, John | Liberal-Conservative |
| Archibald, Thomas Dickson | Liberal-Conservative |
| Dickey, Robert B. | Conservative |
| Holmes, John | Conservative |
| Kenny, Edward | Conservative |
| Locke, John | Liberal |
| William Miller | Liberal-Conservative |
| McCully, Jonathan | Liberal |
| Ritchie, John William | Conservative |
| Wier, Benjamin (Note: Former member of Legislative Assembly at time of appointment) | Liberal |

=== New Brunswick ===
| Name | Political party |
|---|---|
| Botsford, Amos Edwin | Conservative |
| Chandler, Edward Barron (Note: Declined appointment) | Conservative |
| Ferguson, John | Conservative |
| Hazen, Robert Leonard | Conservative |
| McClelan, Abner Reid (Note: Member of Legislative Assembly at time of appointment) | Liberal |
| Mitchell, Peter | Liberal-Conservative |
| Odell, William Hunter | Conservative |
| Robertson, John | Liberal |
| Steeves, William Henry | Liberal |
| Todd, William | Liberal |
| Wark, David | Liberal |
| Wilmot, Robert Duncan | Conservative |

== Related provisions ==
The Proclamation of the Constitution Act, 1867 named the initial group of senators appointed under this provision.

Section 24 of the Act authorises the governor general to summon "qualified persons" to be members of the Senate.

Section 127 of the Act set out the process for inviting members of the provincial legislative councils to be included in the list of nominees in the Proclamation.
