= List of members of the Senate of Canada (A) =

Senator	Lifespan	Party	Prov.	Entered	Left	Appointed by	Left due to	For life?
John Abbott	1821–1893	L	QC	12 May 1887	30 October 1893	Macdonald	Death	Y
Michael Adams	1845–1899	C	NB	7 January 1896	1 January 1899	Bowell	Death	Y
Willie Adams	1934–present	L	NT; NU	5 April 1977; September 2, 1999	September 2, 1999; 22 June 2009	Trudeau, P.	Retirement	
Charles Adler	1954–present		MB	16 August 2024	—	Trudeau, J.	—	
James Cox Aikins	1823–1904	LC	ON	23 October 1867; 7 January 1896	30 May 1882; 6 August 1904	Royal proclamation Bowell	Resignation; Death	Y
John Black Aird	1923–1995	L	ON	10 November 1964	28 November 1974	Pearson	Resignation	Y
George Alexander	1814–1903	C	ON	30 May 1873	29 May 1891	Macdonald	Resignation	Y
George William Allan	1822–1901	C	ON	23 October 1867	24 July 1901	Royal proclamation	Death	Y
William Johnston Almon	1816–1901	LC	NS	15 April 1879	18 February 1901	Macdonald	Death	Y
Doris Margaret Anderson	1922–2022	L	PE	21 September 1995	5 July 1997	Chrétien	Retirement	
John Hawkins Anderson	1805–1870	L	NS	23 October 1867	24 December 1870	Royal proclamation	Death	Y
Margaret Dawn Anderson	1967–present		NT	12 December 2018	—	Trudeau, J.	—	
Margaret Jean Anderson	1915–2003	L	NB	23 March 1978	7 August 1990	Trudeau, P.	Retirement	
Raynell Andreychuk	1944–present	C	SK	11 March 1993	14 August 2019	Mulroney	—	
Auguste-Réal Angers	1837–1919	C	QC	16 December 1892	10 June 1896	Thompson	Resignation	Y
W. David Angus	1937–present	C	QC	10 June 1993	21 July 2012	Mulroney	Retirement	
Thomas Dickson Archibald	1813–1890	LC	NS	23 October 1867	18 October 1890	Royal proclamation	Death	Y
Hazen Argue	1921–1991	L	SK	24 February 1966	2 October 1991	Pearson	Death	
Joseph-François Armand	1820–1903	C	QC	23 October 1867	1 January 1903	Royal proclamation	Death	Y
Dawn Arnold	1966–present		NB	7 March 2025	—	Trudeau, J.	—	
David Arnot	1952–present		SK	29 July 2021	—	Trudeau, J.	—	
Joseph-Octave Arsenault	1828–1897	C	PE	18 February 1895	14 December 1897	Bowell	Death	Y
James Arthurs	1866–1937	C	ON	20 July 1935	7 October 1937	Bennett	Death	Y
Walter Aseltine	1886–1971	C	SK	30 December 1933	31 March 1971	Bennett	Resignation	Y
Martial Asselin	1924–2013	PC	QC	1 September 1972	7 August 1990	Trudeau, P.	Resignation	
Salma Ataullahjan	1952–present	C	ON	9 July 2010	—	Harper	—	
Norman Atkins	1934–2010	PC	ON	2 July 1986	27 June 2009	Mulroney	Retirement	
Réjean Aucoin	1955–present		NS	31 October 2023	—	Trudeau, J.	—	
Michèle Audette	1971–present		QC	29 July 2021	—	Trudeau, J.	—	
Jack Austin	1932–present	L	BC	19 August 1975	2 March 2007	Trudeau, P.	Retirement	
Allen Bristol Aylesworth	1854–1952	L	ON	11 January 1923	13 February 1952	King	Death	Y
