= William Barton Northrup =

Canadian politician (1856–1925)

William Barton Northrup KC
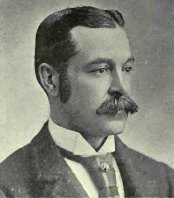

5th Clerk of the House of Commons
- In office March 1918 – December 1924
- Preceded by: Thomas Barnard Flint
- Succeeded by: Arthur Beauchesne

Member of the Canadian Parliament for Hastings East
- In office 1900–1917
- Preceded by: Jeremiah M. Hurley
- Succeeded by: Thomas Henry Thompson
- In office 1892–1896
- Preceded by: Samuel Barton Burdett
- Succeeded by: Jeremiah M. Hurley

Personal details
- Born: October 19, 1856 Belleville, Canada West
- Died: November 22, 1925 (aged 69)
- Party: Conservative
- Education: University of Toronto
- Profession: Lawyer

William Barton Northrup, KC (October 19, 1856 – October 22, 1925) was a Canadian lawyer and politician.

Born in Belleville, Canada West, the son of Anson Gilbert Northrup and Jane C. Balster, Northrup was educated at the Upper Canada College and the University of Toronto, where he received a Bachelor of Arts degree in 1877 and a Master of Arts degree in 1878. A lawyer he was head of the firm of Northrup & Roberts, in Belleville. He was created a King's Counsel in 1903.

He first ran unsuccessfully as the Conservative candidate for the House of Commons of Canada for the Ontario electoral district of Hastings East in the 1891 federal election losing to Liberal Samuel Barton Burdett. After Burdett died in office in 1892, Northrup was acclaimed in the resulting 1892 by-election. He was defeated in the 1896 federal election and was elected in 1900, 1904, 1908, and 1911.

From 1918 to 1924, he was the Clerk of the House of Commons.
