= Robert Read =

Canadian politician

The Honourable Robert Read
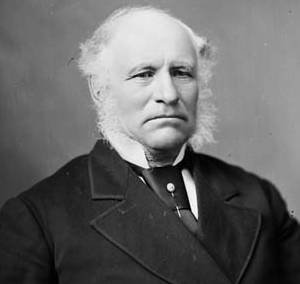

Canadian Senator from Ontario
- In office February 24, 1871 – June 29, 1896
- Appointed by: John A. Macdonald

Member of Parliament for Hastings East
- In office 1867–1871
- Succeeded by: John White

Personal details
- Born: December 11, 1814 Fressingfield in Suffolk, England
- Died: June 29, 1896 (aged 81)
- Party: Conservative

Robert Read (December 11, 1814 – June 29, 1896) was a Canadian businessman and politician. He represented Hastings East in the 1st Canadian Parliament as a Conservative until February 24, 1871 when he was named to the Senate of Canada for Quinte division.

== Background ==
He was born at Fressingfield in Suffolk, England in 1814, the son of Robert Read, and came to Upper Canada in 1836, settling at Belleville. Read was a farmer, distiller and tanner. He also served as director of the Grand Trunk Railway. He was elected to the Legislative Council of the Province of Canada for Quinte in 1862 and then was elected to the House of Commons after Confederation.

In 1840, Read married Margaret Campion. Read remarried in 1894 to Mary Jane Horsey, the eldest daughter of Kingston architect Edward Horsey. He died in office in 1896.
