= Section 127 =

Section 127 may refer to:

== Australia ==
- Section 127 of the Constitution of Australia (repealed 1967), excluding Indigenous Australians from population counts

== India ==
- Section 127 of the Indian Penal Code, offence of receiving property by waging war against the state

== United Kingdom ==
- Section 127 of the Communications Act 2003, prohibiting "grossly offensive, indecent, obscene or menacing" electronic communications
- Section 127 of the Magistrates' Courts Act 1980, establishing a six-month limitation period for summary offences

== Canada ==
- Section 127 of the Constitution Act, 1867
