= Samuel Burdett =

Samuel Burdett may refer to:

- Samuel Swinfin Burdett (1836–1914), U.S. Representative from Missouri
- Samuel Barton Burdett (1843–1892), politician, lawyer and lecturer
