= Section 4 =

Section 4 may refer to:

- Section 4 of the Constitution of Australia
- Section 4 of the Canadian Charter of Rights and Freedoms
- Section 4 of the Human Rights Act 1998 (UK)
- Section 4 of the Constitution Act, 1867
- Section 4 of the Indian Penal Code, describing when the code may apply to extraterritorial offences

== See also ==
- MI4, British Directorate of Military Intelligence, Section 4
