= Section 4 of the Constitution Act, 1867 =

Provision of the Constitution of Canada

British North America Act, 1867

Section 4 of the Constitution Act, 1867 (French: article 4 de la Loi constitutionnelle de 1867) is a provision of the Constitution of Canada relating to the meaning of the name "Canada".

The Constitution Act, 1867 is the constitutional statute which established Canada. Originally named the British North America Act, 1867, the Act continues to be the foundational statute for the Constitution of Canada, although it has been amended many times since 1867. It is now recognised as part of the supreme law of Canada.

== Constitution Act, 1867 ==
The Constitution Act, 1867 is part of the Constitution of Canada and thus part of the supreme law of Canada. The Act sets out the constitutional framework of Canada, including the structure of the federal government and the powers of the federal government and the provinces. It was the product of extensive negotiations between the provinces of British North America at the Charlottetown Conference in 1864, the Quebec Conference in 1864, and the London Conference in 1866. Those conferences were followed by consultations with the British government in 1867. The Act was then enacted in 1867 by the British Parliament under the name the British North America Act, 1867. In 1982 the Act was brought under full Canadian control through the Patriation of the Constitution, and was renamed the Constitution Act, 1867. Since Patriation, the Act can only be amended in Canada, under the amending formula set out in the Constitution Act, 1982.

== Text of section 4 ==
Section 4 reads:

Construction of subsequent Provisions of Act
4 Unless it is otherwise expressed or implied, the Name Canada shall be taken to mean Canada as constituted under this Act.

Section 4 is found in Part II of the Constitution Act, 1867, dealing with the union. It has been amended once, in 1893.

== Legislative history ==
Neither the Quebec Resolutions nor the London Resolutions dealt with the name of the new country, leaving it to the formal choice of the Queen. However, by the time of the London Conference in 1866, there was general agreement among the delegates that the name would be Canada, which they then recommended. Section 3 of the Act provides that the name of the new country will be Canada.

Section 4 was not included in the drafts of the Act until the final draft. As originally enacted, it read as follows:

4 The subsequent Provisions of this Act shall, unless it is otherwise expressed or implied, commence and have effect on and after the Union, that is to say, on and after the Day appointed for the Union taking effect in the Queen’s Proclamation; and in the same Provisions, unless it is otherwise expressed or implied, the Name Canada shall be taken to mean Canada as constituted under this Act.

The section was amended by a British statute law revision act in 1893, which deleted the first part of the sentence. There is no indication that the British government consulted the government of Canada about the amendment. Section 4 has not been amended since 1893.

== Purpose and interpretation ==
The first part of the section, as originally adopted in 1867, was a transitional provision. It gave guidance on the implementation of the statute, since it would come into force on proclamation, rather than immediately on royal assent. This initial wording was spent once the Act was in force and was eventually repealed by the British Parliament by the Statute Law Revision Act, 1893.

The second part of the section, preserved in the current version, is a definitional section. The word "Canada" is used in the Act to refer to the new country, but the word "Canada" also occurs in references to the Province of Canada, Lower Canada, and Upper Canada. Section 4 indicates that when "Canada" is used in the Act, it generally refers to the new country.

== Related provisions of the Constitution Act, 1867 ==
Section 3 of the Act provides that the name of the new country is Canada.

Section 6 of the Act refers to the Province of Canada, and to the provinces of Upper Canada and Lower Canada.

== See also ==
Name of Canada
