= Samuel Barton Burdett =

Canadian politician (1843–1892)

Member of the Canadian Parliament for Hastings East
- In office 1887–1892
- Preceded by: John White
- Succeeded by: William Barton Northrup

Personal details
- Born: September 30, 1843 Tyendinaga, Canada West
- Died: January 20, 1892 (aged 48)
- Party: Liberal
- Occupation: lawyer, lecturer

Samuel Barton Burdett (born September 30, 1843 in Tyendinaga, Canada West-died January 20, 1892) was a politician, lawyer and lecturer. He was elected to the House of Commons of Canada as a Member in the 1887 election. He was re-elected in the 1891 election then died in office on January 20, 1892. He also served as a councillor for the town of Belleville, Ontario.
