= William Dickson (Upper Canada) =

Canadian businessman, lawyer and politician (1769–1846)

William Dickson (July 13, 1769 – February 19, 1846) was a businessman, lawyer and political figure in Upper Canada.

He was born in Dumfries, Scotland in 1769. In 1785, he emigrated to the Niagara Peninsula, where he managed mills and a store for Robert Hamilton, his cousin. In 1793, with Samuel Street, he arranged the sale of Six Nations lands along the Grand River, acting as an agent for Joseph Brant.

In 1806, he took issue with remarks made during a trial by William Weekes against the former Lieutenant Governor Peter Hunter, who had died in 1805. Weekes challenged him to a duel and, on October 10, was fatally wounded by Dickson and died the next day.

He was taken prisoner by the Americans at Niagara during the War of 1812 and his house was burned during the American withdrawal.

He was appointed to Upper Canada's Legislative Council in 1815. In 1816, he began developing a block of land he had acquired along the Grand River, which later became Dumfries Township and the town of Galt. He encouraged Scottish immigration into that area and is also the namesake of the Dickson Hill neighbourhood in West Galt.

He died at Niagara in 1846.

One son, Robert, served in the Legislative Assembly and another, Walter, later became a member of the Senate of Canada.
