= Robert Dickson (Upper Canada politician) =

Lawyer and political figure in Upper Canada

Robert Dickson (1796 – November 28, 1846) was a lawyer and political figure in Upper Canada.

He was born at Newark (Niagara-on-the-Lake) in 1796, the son of William Dickson, a member of the Legislative Council. He studied in Edinburgh and settled in Niagara. He served in the local militia, becoming captain in 1829, and was elected to represent the town in the Legislative Assembly of Upper Canada in 1828. He died in Livorno, Italy in 1846.

His younger brother Walter Hamilton later became a member of the Canadian Senate.
