= Barthélemy Pouliot =

Canadian politician

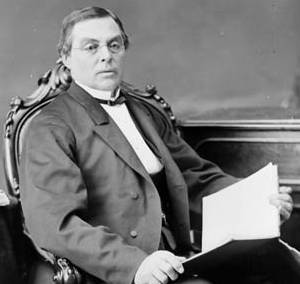

Member of the Canadian Parliament for L'Islet
- In office 1867–1872
- Succeeded by: Philippe Baby Casgrain

Personal details
- Born: October 15, 1811 St-Jean d'Orléans, Lower Canada
- Died: February 26, 1890 (aged 78) L'Islet (L'Islet-sur-Mer), Quebec
- Party: Conservative

Barthélemy Pouliot (October 15, 1811 – February 26, 1890) was a Quebec businessman and political figure. He represented L'Islet in the 1st Canadian Parliament as a Conservative member.

He was born in Saint-Jean on the Île d'Orléans in 1811 and was educated at Quebec City. He became a merchant in L'Islet-sur-Mer. Pouliot was one of the founders of the Québec, Chaudière, Maine and Portland Railway. He also served as justice of the peace. Pouliot was elected to the House of Commons in 1867; his election was annulled after an appeal but he was reelected in an 1869 by-election.

He died at L'Islet in 1890.

== Electoral record ==
1867 Canadian federal election: L'Islet
Party	Candidate	Votes	Elected
Conservative	Barthélemy Pouliot	464	✓
Unknown	Louis-Bonaventure Caron	40	
Source: Canadian Elections Database

By-election: On Mr. Pouliot being unseated on petition

By-election on 14 July 1869
Party	Candidate	Votes
Conservative	Barthélemy Pouliot	697
Unknown	Louis-Bonaventure Caron	460

1872 Canadian federal election: L'Islet
Party	Candidate	Votes
Liberal	Philippe Baby Casgrain	646
Conservative	Barthélemy Pouliot	599
Source: Canadian Elections Database
