= Louis Olivier =

Canadian politician

Louis Olivier (1758 – February 4, 1816) was a political figure in Lower Canada.

He was born Louis-Marie-Olivier Olivier at Berthier in 1758, the son of a French soldier from Paris. He became a merchant at Berthier and also served as postmaster. Olivier was a member of the local militia, later becoming major, and served during the War of 1812. In 1800, he was named a justice of the peace for Trois-Rivières district and a commissioner for the trial of small claims in 1808. In 1792, he was elected to the 1st Parliament of Lower Canada for Warwick; he was elected again in 1810.

Olivier died, probably at Berthier, in 1816.

His grandson, Louis Auguste Olivier, later served in the Canadian senate. His great-granddaughter Julie-Élizabeth-Geneviève "Jane" Morrison was the second wife of Louis-Hippolyte Lafontaine.
