= Ontario Bank =

Canadian bank (1857–1906)

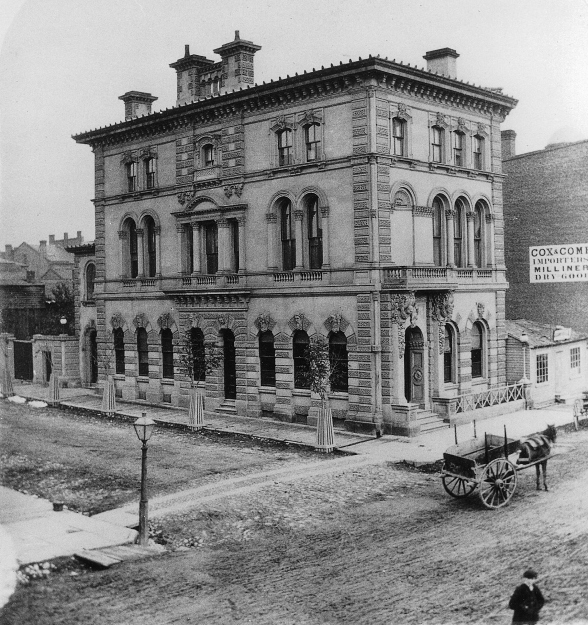
- An Ontario Bank branch at Wellington and Scott Streets in Toronto, 1868
- Type: Private
- Industry: Banking
- Founded: 1857; 169 years ago in Bowmanville, Ontario, Canada
- Founder: John Simpson
- Defunct: 1906; 120 years ago
- Fate: Acquired by the Bank of Montreal
- Successor: Bank of Montreal
- Headquarters: Toronto, Ontario, Canada
- Area served: Ontario

Ontario Bank was an early bank operating in Ontario, Canada. It began operations in 1857 and was last listed as a member of the Canadian Bankers Association in 1901.

The bank was founded in Bowmanville, Ontario by John Simpson, a local resident and a former bank manager for the town's Bank of Montreal branch. Simpson later became one of Canada's first senators.

Simpson opened the bank's first branch in Bowmanville in 1857. In 1861 the impressive Toronto branch was built and by 1868 a limestone and brick head office building had been built in Bowmanville. In 1875, the head office was moved to Toronto.

The bank and its 30 branches across the province were absorbed into the Bank of Montreal in the fall of 1906, after its general manager Charles McGill was found to have been speculating in the U.S. stock markets with bank funds and sustained an estimated $1.25 million in losses from ill-timed short sales. McGill was convicted of filing false tax returns and sentenced to a five-year prison term early in 1907.
