= Section 127 of the Constitution Act, 1867 =

Provision of the Constitution of Canada

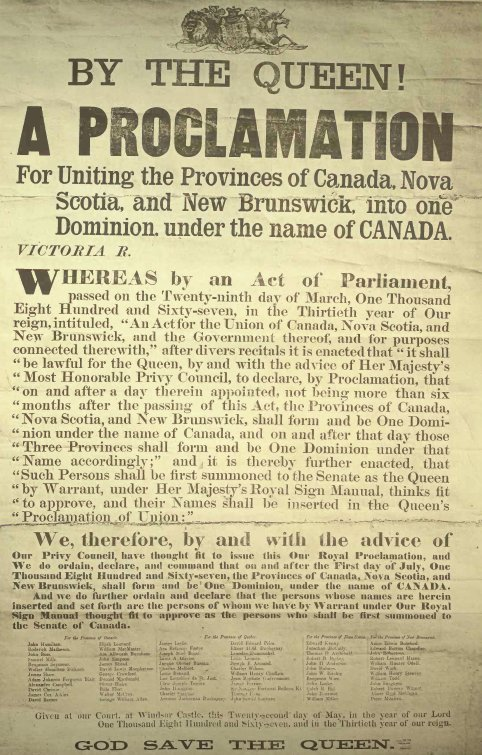

Section 127 of the Constitution Act, 1867 (French: article 127 de la Loi constitutionnelle de 1867) is a repealed provision of the Constitution of Canada relating to the appointment of the first senators in the Senate of Canada. It outlined how members of the existing provincial Legislative Councils could be appointed to the Senate.

The Constitution Act, 1867 is the constitutional statute which established Canada. Originally named the British North America Act, 1867, the act continues to be the foundational statute for the Constitution of Canada, although it has been amended many times since 1867. It is now recognised as part of the supreme law of Canada.

== Constitution Act, 1867 ==
The Constitution Act, 1867 is part of the Constitution of Canada and thus part of the supreme law of Canada. It was the product of extensive negotiations by the governments of the British North American provinces in the 1860s. The act sets out the constitutional framework of Canada, including the structure of the federal government and the powers of the federal government and the provinces. Originally enacted in 1867 by the British Parliament under the name the British North America Act, 1867, in 1982 the act was brought under full Canadian control through the Patriation of the Constitution, and was renamed the Constitution Act, 1867. Since Patriation the act can only be amended in Canada, under the amending formula set out in the Constitution Act, 1982.

== Text of section 127 ==
Section 127 read:

As to Legislative Councillors of Provinces becoming Senators
127 If any Person being at the passing of this Act a Member of the Legislative Council of Canada, Nova Scotia, or New Brunswick, to whom a Place in the Senate is offered, does not within Thirty Days thereafter, by Writing under his Hand, addressed to the Governor General of the Province of Canada or to the Lieutenant Governor of Nova Scotia or New Brunswick (as the Case may be), accept the same, he shall be deemed to have declined the same; and any Person who, being at the passing of this Act a Member of 'the Legislative Council of Nova Scotia or New Brunswick, accepts a Place in the Senate, shall thereby vacate his Seat in such Legislative Council.

Section 127 was found in Part IX of the Constitution Act, 1867, dealing with miscellaneous provisions of a general nature. It was repealed in 1893 as part of a general statute law revision.

== Purpose and interpretation ==
The Senate of Canada is the upper house of the Parliament of Canada. Senators are appointed, not elected. Prior to Confederation, the Province of Canada, New Brunswick and Nova Scotia each had bicameral parliaments, with the upper house termed the Legislative Council.

The Quebec Resolutions provided that positions in the new Senate of Canada would be offered to current members of the provincial legislative councils, in proportion to the representation of the government and opposition members, so that "all political parties may as nearly as possible be fairly represented." This principle was not expressly included in the act itself, but was implemented in the initial appointments to the Senate, which were largely drawn from the provincial legislative councils.

This section of the act provided the mechanism for offers to be made to members of the legislative councils, prior to the Royal Proclamation being issued to bring the act into force. Once an offer of a Senate position was made, a legislative councillor had 30 days to signify whether he accepted the position. If so, his name would be included in the royal proclamation. A person appointed to the Senate in this way gave up their seat in the provincial legislative council.

== Repeal ==
Section 127 was repealed by the British Parliament in 1893, in the Statute Law Revision Act 1893. The revision act was of a housekeeping nature, repealing statutory provisions which no longer had any purpose. Since the initial senators had been appointed in 1867, section 127 was no longer needed and was repealed.

== Related provisions ==
The Proclamation of the Constitution Act, 1867 was the formal document which proclaimed the Constitution Act, 1867 to be in force as of July 1, 1867. The Proclamation included the names of the 72 men who were to be appointed to the Senate.

Section 23 of the Act sets out the qualifications for a member of the Senate.

Section 25 of the Act provided for the initial appointment of the members of the Senate, whose names would be included in the royal proclamation bringing the act into force.
