= Louis-Bonaventure Caron =

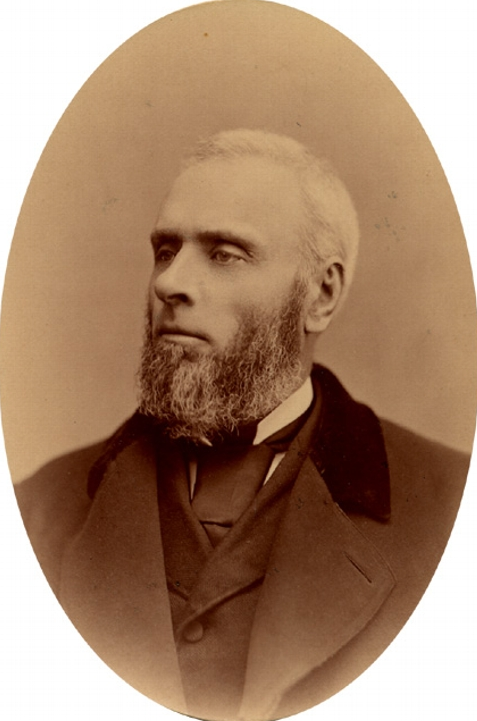

Member of the Legislative Assembly of the Province of Canada for L'Islet
- In office 1863–1866

Personal details
- Born: November 16, 1828 L'Islet (L'Islet-sur-Mer), Lower Canada
- Died: May 28, 1915 (aged 86) L'Islet (L'Islet-sur-Mer), Quebec

Louis-Bonaventure Caron (November 16, 1828 – May 28, 1915) was a lawyer, judge and political figure in Quebec. He represented L'Islet in the Legislative Assembly of the Province of Canada from 1863 to 1866.

He was born in L'Islet, Quebec, the son of Bonaventure Caron and Rosalie Martineau, and was educated at the Sainte-Anne-de-la-Pocatière College, the Séminaire de Nicolet and the Séminaire de Saint-Hyacinthe. Caron was admitted to the bar in 1855. Caron was elected in L'Islet in 1858 but his election was overturned in June that same year; he ran unsuccessfully in 1861. He opposed Confederation. Caron was an unsuccessful candidate for a seat in the Canadian House of Commons in 1867 and 1869. In 1866, he married Angélique-Élisabeth-Hermine Pacaud, the daughter of Édouard-Louis Pacaud. In 1874, he was named to the Quebec Superior Court for the Gaspé district and then to the Quebec district three years later. He retired from the bench in 1903. Caron died in L'Islet at the age of 86.

== Electoral record ==
1867 Canadian federal election: L'Islet
Party	Candidate	Votes	Elected
Conservative	Barthélemy Pouliot	464	✓
Unknown	Louis-Bonaventure Caron	40	
Source: Canadian Elections Database

By-election: On Mr. Pouliot being unseated on petition

By-election on 14 July 1869
Party	Candidate	Votes
Conservative	Barthélemy Pouliot	697
Unknown	Louis-Bonaventure Caron	460
