= Hastings East =

Former federal electoral district in Ontario, Canada

Ontario electoral district

Defunct federal electoral district
- Legislature: House of Commons
- District created: 1867
- District abolished: 1924
- First contested: 1867
- Last contested: 1921

Hastings East was a federal electoral district represented in the House of Commons of Canada from 1867 to 1925. It was located in the province of Ontario. It was created by the British North America Act 1867 which divided the County of Hastings into three ridings: Hastings East, Hastings West, and Hastings North.

The East Riding consisted of the Townships of Thurlow, Tyendinaga, and Hungerford In 1903, the county of Hastings was divided into two ridings when the north riding was abolished.

The East Riding was expanded to include the townships of Madoc, Elzevir and Grimsthorpe, Tudor, Cashel, Limerick, Dungannon, Mayo, Monteagle and Carlow; the town of Deseronto, and the villages of Madoc and Tweed.

The electoral district was abolished in 1924 when it was redistributed between Hastings South and Hastings—Peterborough ridings.

== Members of Parliament ==
This riding has elected the following members of Parliament:

Parliament	Years	Member	Party
1st	1867–1871	Robert Read	Conservative
1st	1871–1872	John White	Conservative
2nd	1872–1874	John White	Conservative
3rd	1874–1878	John White	Conservative
4th	1878–1879	John White	Conservative
4th	1879–1882	John White	Conservative
5th	1882–1887	John White	Conservative
6th	1887–1891	Samuel Barton Burdett	Liberal
7th	1891–1892	Samuel Barton Burdett	Liberal
7th	1892–1896	William Barton Northrup	Conservative
8th	1896–1900	Jeremiah M. Hurley	Liberal
9th	1900–1904	William Barton Northrup	Conservative
10th	1904–1908	William Barton Northrup	Conservative
11th	1908–1911	William Barton Northrup	Conservative
12th	1911–1917	William Barton Northrup	Conservative
13th	1917–1921	Thomas Henry Thompson	Government (Unionist)
14th	1921–1925	Thomas Henry Thompson	Conservative
Riding dissolved into Hastings South and Hastings—Peterborough

== Election results ==
1867 Canadian federal election
Party	Candidate	Votes
Conservative	Robert Read	1,110
Liberal	James Farley	457
Eligible voters		2,096
Source: Canadian Parliamentary Guide, 1871

On Mr. Read being called to the Senate, 24 February 1871:

By-election on 20 March 1871
Party	Candidate	Votes
Conservative	John White	acclaimed

1872 Canadian federal election
Party	Candidate	Votes
Conservative	John White	818
Liberal	Wellington Frizzell	774
Unknown	Thomas Holden	229

1874 Canadian federal election
Party	Candidate	Votes
Conservative	John White	1,049
Unknown	Thomas Holden	978

1878 Canadian federal election
Party	Candidate	Votes
Conservative	John White	1,060
Unknown	W. R. Aylsworth	1,040

On Mr. White being unseated, 5 February 1879

By-election on 25 February 1879
Party	Candidate	Votes
Conservative	John White	1,373
Liberal	Willet Farley	1,299

1882 Canadian federal election
Party	Candidate	Votes
Conservative	John White	1,386
Liberal	Harford Ashley	1,333

1887 Canadian federal election
Party	Candidate	Votes
Liberal	Samuel Barton Burdett	1,759
Conservative	John White	1,695

1891 Canadian federal election
Party	Candidate	Votes
Liberal	Samuel Barton Burdett	1,951
Conservative	William Barton Northrup	1,897

On Mr. Burdett's death, 20 January 1892 while still a member:

By-election on 20 February 1892
Party	Candidate	Votes
Conservative	William Barton Northrup	acclaimed

1896 Canadian federal election
Party	Candidate	Votes
Liberal	J. M. Hurley	1,508
Conservative	W. B. Northrup	1,285
Patrons of Industry	James Balcanquel	908

1900 Canadian federal election
Party	Candidate	Votes
Conservative	W. B. Northrup	1,815
Liberal	J. M. Hurley	1,744

1904 Canadian federal election
Party	Candidate	Votes
Conservative	W. B. Northrup	2,961
Unknown	Georges E. Deroche	2,633

1908 Canadian federal election
Party	Candidate	Votes
Conservative	William Barton Northrup	2,864
Liberal	John K. McCargar	1,519

1911 Canadian federal election
Party	Candidate	Votes
Conservative	William Barton Northrup	2,899
Liberal	Peter Perry Clark	1,833

1917 Canadian federal election
Party	Candidate	Votes
Government (Unionist)	Thomas Henry Thompson	4,202
Opposition (Laurier Liberals)	William Cross	1,909

1921 Canadian federal election
Party	Candidate	Votes
Conservative	Thomas Henry Thompson	4,986
Progressive	James Albert Caskey	3,592
Liberal	James Vincent Walsh	1,246

== See also ==
- List of Canadian electoral districts
- Historical federal electoral districts of Canada
