= Section 3 of the Constitution Act, 1867 =

Provision of the Constitution of Canada

British North America Act, 1867

Section 3 of the Constitution Act, 1867 (French: article 3 de la Loi constitutionnelle de 1867) is a provision of the Constitution of Canada relating to the union of the original three provinces into Canada. Under the authority of this section, Queen Victoria issued the Proclamation of the Constitution Act, 1867, which brought the Act into force on July 1, 1867, creating Canada.

The Constitution Act, 1867 is the constitutional statute which established Canada. Originally named the British North America Act, 1867, the Act continues to be the foundational statute for the Constitution of Canada, although it has been amended many times since 1867. It is now recognised as part of the supreme law of Canada.

== Constitution Act, 1867 ==
The Constitution Act, 1867 is part of the Constitution of Canada and thus part of the supreme law of Canada. The Act sets out the constitutional framework of Canada, including the structure of the federal government and the powers of the federal government and the provinces. It was the product of extensive negotiations between the provinces of British North America at the Charlottetown Conference in 1864, the Quebec Conference in 1864, and the London Conference in 1866. Those conferences were followed by consultations with the British government in 1867. The Act was then enacted in 1867 by the British Parliament under the name the British North America Act, 1867. In 1982 the Act was brought under full Canadian control through the Patriation of the Constitution, and was renamed the Constitution Act, 1867. Since Patriation, the Act can only be amended in Canada, under the amending formula set out in the Constitution Act, 1982.

== Text of section 3 ==
Section 3 reads:

Declaration of Union
3. It shall be lawful for the Queen, by and with the Advice of Her Majesty's Most Honourable Privy Council, to declare by Proclamation that, on and after a Day therein appointed, not being more than Six Months after the passing of this Act, the Provinces of Canada, Nova Scotia, and New Brunswick shall form and be One Dominion under the Name of Canada; and on and after that Day those Three Provinces shall form and be One Dominion under that Name accordingly.

Section 3 is found in Part II of the Constitution Act, 1867, dealing with the union. It has not been amended since the Act was enacted in 1867.

== Legislative history ==
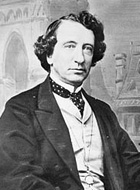
John A. Macdonald of the Province of Canada, who wanted the Kingdom of Canada

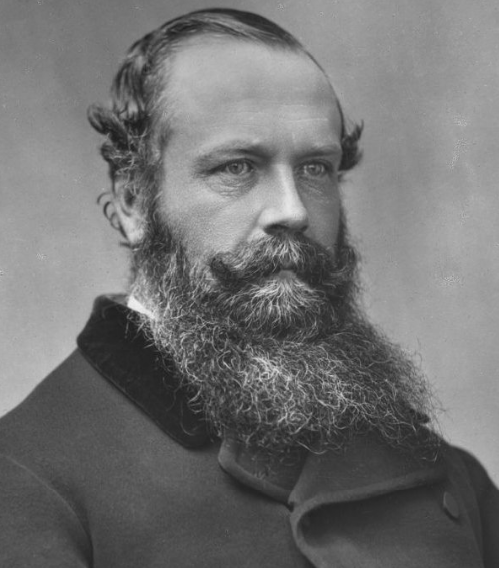
Governor General Lord Monck, who thought "Kingdom" presumptuous

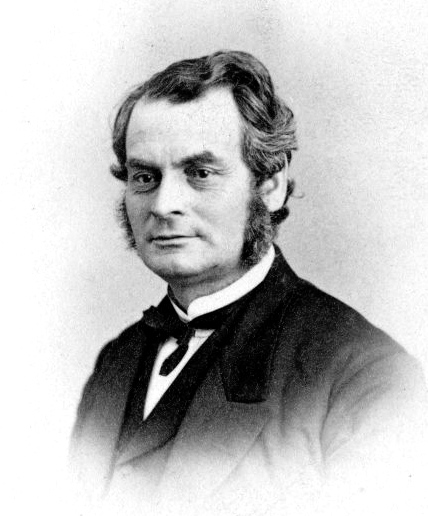
Samuel Leonard Tilley of New Brunswick, who may have proposed "Dominion" based on Psalm 72

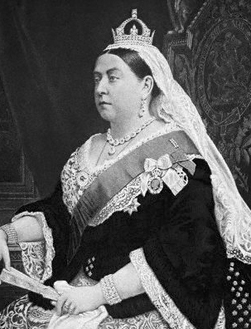
Queen Victoria, who was not enthusiastic about "Dominion"

The Quebec Resolutions stated that the Queen would be solicited to determine both "the rank and name of the Federated Provinces". The London Resolutions similarly stated that the Queen would be solicited to name "the rank and name of the Confederation."

The name of the new country did not pose any difficulties. One of the Maritime delegates to the London Conference proposed that the name be "Canada". That proposal was unanimously accepted.

There was more debate about the rank of the new country. The British North American delegates, particularly John A. Macdonald, generally favoured that the new country by termed a "Kingdom", and inserted that term into two of the earlier drafts of the bill.

This proposal met with opposition within the British government. The Governor General of the Province of Canada, Lord Monck, had raised concerns about using the term "kingdom". The Colonial Office and the Foreign Office both objected, considering that the proposed use of the term was presumptuous in the colonial setting. There were also concerns that using "kingdom" would lead to difficulties with the United States. Some Americans were already criticising the extension of the monarchical principle in the Confederation proposal.

Faced with this opposition from the British government, the delegates adopted the term "Dominion", perhaps on a suggestion from Samuel Leonard Tilley of New Brunswick citing Psalm 72: "He shall have dominion also from sea to sea and from the river unto the ends of the earth." Neither the Queen nor Prime Minister Derby were advised that the delegates had originally wanted the rank of "Kingdom". The Queen approved the choice of "Dominion" for the final draft of the bill, but was unenthusiastic about the term.

The term "Dominion of Canada" was used in some subsequent constitutional amendments, such as the Constitution Act, 1871, but the term fell out of use in the 1950s. In the final British statute relating to Canada, the Canada Act 1982 which achieved Patriation, only the name "Canada" is used.

== Purpose and interpretation ==
=== July 1, 1867 ===
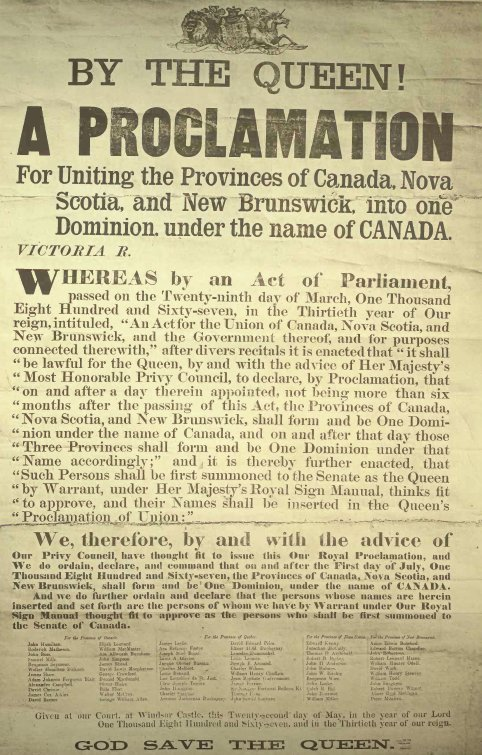
Proclamation bringing the Constitution Act into force, July 1, 1867

The Constitution Act, 1867 was passed by the British Parliament in March, 1867, receiving royal assent on March 29, 1867. However, it did not come into force immediately, as time was needed to prepare for the implementation of the new federal structure, particularly the selection of the new federal Cabinet.

By royal proclamation dated May 22, 1867, issued under the authority of this section, the date for the coming into force of the Act, and thus the creation of Canada, was set for July 1, 1867. Governor General Lord Monck appointed John A. Macdonald as the first prime minister of Canada. Macdonald then spent the months of May and June forming the new Cabinet, which required balancing a number of regional, sectarian, and linguistic issues. The new federal government then came into effect on July 1, 1867. That date is now commemorated as a national holiday, Canada Day.

=== Nature of the union ===
The courts have commented on the nature of the union set out in the Constitution Act, 1867, making it clear that the union mentioned in s. 3 is a federal union, not a legislative union, a political distinction first described by Lord Durham in the Durham Report. For example, in Reference re the Initiative and Referendum Act, the Judicial Committee of the Privy Council stated:

The scheme of the Act passed in 1867 was thus, not to weld the Provinces into one, nor to subordinate Provincial Governments to a central authority, but to establish a Central Government in which these Provinces should be represented, entrusted with exclusive authority only in affairs in which they had a common interest. Subject to this each Province was to retain its independence and autonomy, and to be directly under the Crown as its head.

The Supreme Court of Canada has cited this passage with approval, notably in Reference re Secession of Quebec.

=== Use of "Dominion" ===
The use and meaning of the term "Dominion" has fluctuated over time. The word "dominions" had been a general term for British overseas possessions, and its use in 1867 seems simply to have been a particular example of that meaning.

By the time of the 1907 Colonial Conference, the term "Dominion" (spelt with an uppercase "D") had acquired a more particular meaning: a major self-governing British possession, more than a simple colony. This usage of "Dominion" was proposed by Sir Wilfrid Laurier, Prime Minister of Canada, Alfred Deakin, Prime Minister of Australia, and Sir Joseph Ward, Prime Minister of New Zealand, with some support from one of the British delegates to the Conference, Winston Churchill, Parliamentary Under-Secretary for the Colonies. Laurier summarised the proposal: "...we have passed the state when the term 'Colony' could be applied to Canada, New Zealand, and Australia". The proposal was adopted by the Conference.

By the time of the Imperial Conference of 1926, and following the participation of the self-governing Dominions in World War I, it was recognised that the Dominions were fully autonomous within the British Empire and Commonwealth. The report of the Inter-Imperial Relations Committee of the Conference, commonly referred to as the Balfour Declaration, made this point clear, stating that the United Kingdom and the Dominions were "autonomous communities within the British Empire, equal in status, in no way subordinate one to another in any aspect of their domestic or external affairs".

After World War II, the use of the term "Dominion" was gradually abandoned. The British government began using the terms "Commonwealth country" for all members of the Commonwealth, and "Commonwealth realm" for countries which retained the monarch as sovereign. The Canadian government under Prime Minister Louis St. Laurent also dropped the use of the term "Dominion" and began to use "Canada" as the sole name of the country, and "federal government" instead of "Dominion government". Some commentators, such as Eugene Forsey, argued that the formal name of the country remains "Dominion of Canada". By the time of Patriation in 1982, however, the Canada Act 1982, the Constitution Act, 1982 and the Canadian Charter of Rights and Freedoms all use "Canada" alone.

== Related provisions of the Constitution Act, 1867 ==
The Proclamation of the Constitution Act, 1867 was issued under the authority of this section.

The Preamble to the Act states that the Provinces of Canada, Nova Scotia and New Brunswick have requested that they be "…federally united into one Dominion…"

Section 5 of the Act provided that Canada would consist of four provinces: Ontario, Quebec, Nova Scotia and New Brunswick.

Section 6 of the Act divided the Province of Canada into the provinces of Ontario and Quebec, based on the former boundaries of Upper Canada and Lower Canada.

Section 146 of the Act provided for the future admission of Newfoundland, Prince Edward Island, Rupert's Land and the North-Western Territory, and British Columbia into the union.

== See also ==
Name of Canada
