= Thomas Henry Thompson =

Canadian politician (1866–1925)

Thomas Henry Thompson (July 1, 1866 – May 17, 1925) was a merchant, undertaker and political figure in Ontario, Canada. He represented Hastings East in the House of Commons of Canada from 1917 to 1925 as a Unionist Party and then Conservative member.

He was born in Madoc Township, Canada West, the son of Charles Thompson and Alice Brown, and was educated there. Thompson entered business as a furniture merchant and undertaker. In 1892, he married Susan L. Griffin. Thompson served on the council for Hastings County, serving as county warden in 1913, and was reeve of Madoc. Thompson died in office in Madoc at the age of 58.
