= Jeremiah M. Hurley =

Canadian politician (1840–1923)

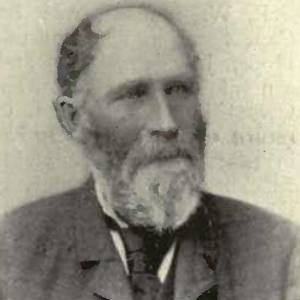
Jeremiah M. Hurley

Jeremiah M. Hurley (August 28, 1840 – December 21, 1923) was a farmer, cheese maker and political figure in Ontario. He represented Hastings East in the House of Commons of Canada from 1896 to 1900 as a Liberal.

He was born in Prince Edward County, Upper Canada, being the son of Irish immigrant Denis Hurley and Anna O'Brien. Hurley was president of the Thurlow Cheese and Butter Factory. In 1871, he married Ellen Donovan. Hurley farmed and raised livestock. He served twelve years as a member of the council for Hastings County and was reeve for Thurlow Township. Hurley was defeated when he ran for reelection in 1900. He died in Belleville at the age of 83.
