= William Todd (businessman) =

Canadian politician (1803–1873)

- Born: July 10, 1803; North Yarmouth, Maine, United States of America
- Died: October 5, 1873 (aged 70)
- Occupation: businessman

William Todd (July 10, 1803 – October 5, 1873) was an American-born businessman who was offered a seat in the Senate of Canada but refused to move to Ottawa and letters patent were not issued. He was affiliated with the Liberal Party of Canada.

Todd was the son of Hannah Worthley Todd and William Todd, a Maine merchant who prospered in the West Indies trade until the Napoleonic Wars ruined the business and he moved his family to New Brunswick in 1811.

Young William was succeeding as a merchant at Milltown on the St. Croix River by the time he was age 22. He eventually became president of the St Croix and Penobscot Railroad and president of the St. Stephen Branch Railroad (which became the New Brunswick and Canada Railway). He was a founder and director of the St. Stephen's Bank in St. Stephen, New Brunswick, and was bank president from 1849 until 1873.

Although he was one of the senators named in Her Majesty's Proclamation of 1867, Todd declined to serve.
