= Benjamin Seymour =

Canadian politician

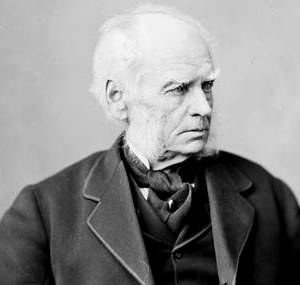
Benjamin Seymour Source: Library and Archives Canada

Benjamin Seymour (ca 1806 – March 23, 1880) was a political figure in Canada West and a Conservative member of the Senate of Canada from 1867 to 1880.

He was born in Fredericksburgh Township in Upper Canada around 1806 and became a merchant in the town of Bath.

In 1844, he was elected to the 2nd Parliament of the Province of Canada representing the counties of Lennox and Addington and he continued to serve in that role until 1854. He was appointed to the Legislative Council. In 1867, he was appointed to the Canadian Senate and died while still in office in 1880.
