= Walter Hamilton Dickson =

Canadian politician

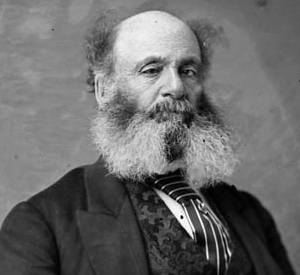
Walter Hamilton Dickson Source: Library and Archives Canada

Walter Hamilton Dickson (January 4, 1806 – July 30, 1885) was a lawyer and political figure in Canada West. He was a Conservative member of the Senate of Canada from 1867 to 1884.

He was born in Newark (Niagara-on-the-Lake), Upper Canada in 1806, the son of William Dickson. In 1813, his home was burned with the rest of the town by American Brigadier-General George McClure. He articled in law with his brother Robert and was called to the bar in 1830. He practised in Dundas and then at Niagara. He served in the cavalry unit of the local militia and served as a major during the Upper Canada Rebellion. Dickson represented Niagara in the Legislative Assembly of the Province of Canada from 1844 to 1851. In 1855, he was appointed to the Legislative Council and served until Confederation, when he was appointed to the Senate. He resigned in 1884.
