= Benjamin Wier =

Canadian politician (1805–1868)

The Hon. Benjamin Wier
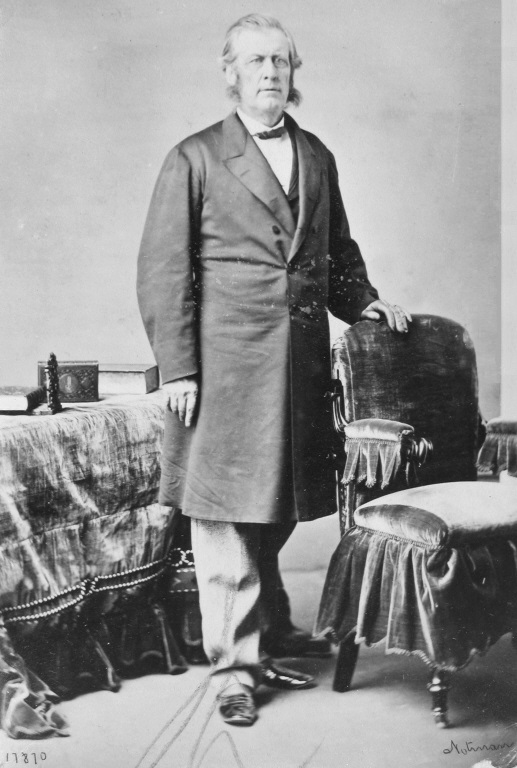

Senator for Nova Scotia
- In office October 23, 1867 – April 14, 1868
- Appointed by: Royal Proclamation

Personal details
- Born: August 9, 1805 Newport Township, Hants County, Nova Scotia
- Died: April 14, 1868 (aged 62) Ottawa, Ontario
- Party: Liberal

Benjamin Wier (August 9, 1805 – April 14, 1868) was a Canadian businessman and politician.

== Early life ==
He was born in Newport Township, Hants County, Nova Scotia, the son of Benjamin Weir. He married Phoebe Wier, a cousin, and opened a store near Windsor. He moved to Halifax in 1830.

== Career ==
He established himself in the wholesale trade, operating a fleet of schooners that traded goods between Nova Scotia and New England. Prior to Canadian Confederation in 1867, Wier represented Halifax township from 1851 to 1859 and Lunenburg County from 1859 to 1863 in the colonial Nova Scotia House of Assembly. During that period, he served in the province's Executive Council from 1855 to 1856 and from 1859 to 1863. After losing his seat in the Nova Scotia election of 1863, he turned his attention to his many business interests. He was president of the Dartmouth Marine Railway and of the Salt Works Company. Weir was also a director of the People's Bank, the Union Marine Insurance Company, the Sydney Marine Railway and the Nova Scotian Telegraph Company. He also served as an alderman for the city of Halifax. Following Confederation, he was appointed to the Senate of Canada on October 23, 1867, by royal proclamation. He represented the senatorial division of Nova Scotia until his death in Ottawa at the age of 62.
