= William Henry Chaffers =

Canadian businessman and politician

The Honourable William Henry Chaffers
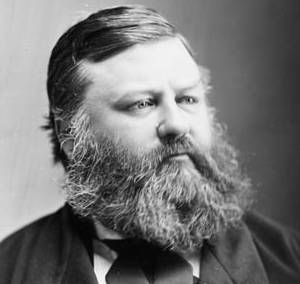

Canadian Senator from Quebec
- In office 1867–1894
- Appointed by: Royal Proclamation
- Succeeded by: William Hales Hingston

Personal details
- Born: August 2, 1827 Quebec City, Lower Canada
- Died: July 19, 1894 (aged 66)
- Party: Liberal

William Henry Chaffers (August 2, 1827 – July 1894) was a Quebec businessman and politician. He was a Liberal member of the Senate of Canada for Rougemont division from 1867 to 1894.

He was born Guillaume-Henri-Jacques Chaffers at Quebec City in 1827 and studied at the college at Chambly and the Petit Séminaire de Montréal. He set up in business at Saint-Césaire. Chaffers was lieutenant-colonel in the local militia. He also served as mayor of Saint-Césaire and warden for Rouville County. He was elected to the Legislative Assembly of the Province of Canada for Rouville in an 1856 by-election. Chaffers was elected to the Legislative Council of the Province of Canada in 1864 and named to the Senate after Confederation.

He died at Saint-Hyacinthe in 1894.

He was the grandson of François Blanchet.
