= Charles Cormier =

Canadian politician

The Honourable Charles Cormier
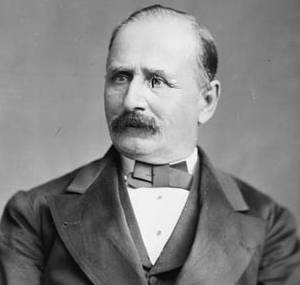

Canadian Senator from Quebec
- In office 1867–1887
- Appointed by: Royal Proclamation
- Succeeded by: Pierre-Étienne Fortin

Personal details
- Born: June 22, 1813 St-Grégoire le Grand, Lower Canada
- Died: May 7, 1887 (aged 73) Plessisville, Quebec, Canada
- Party: Nationalist Liberal
- Children: 1

Charles Cormier (June 22, 1813 – May 7, 1887) was a Quebec businessman and political figure. He was a Nationalist Liberal member of the Senate of Canada for Kennebec division from 1867 to 1887.

He was born into a family of Acadian descent in Saint-Grégoire-le-Grand, Lower Canada in 1813 and studied there and at Trois-Rivières. He was employed on a commission basis at a store in Montreal, later becoming the owner of his own store in 1839. He opened a store at Plessisville, where he also operated mills, farmed and later established a foundery. Cormier served as school commissioner and captain in the local militia. He was a member of the Patriote organization Fils de la liberté, but did not take part in the Lower Canada Rebellion. He served several terms as mayor of Plessisville. In 1862, he was elected to the Legislative Council of the Province of Canada; after Confederation, he was named to the Senate.

He died in Plessisville in 1887.

His son Napoléon-Charles also served as mayor of the town and was a member of the Legislative Council of Quebec.
