= James Skead =

Canadian politician

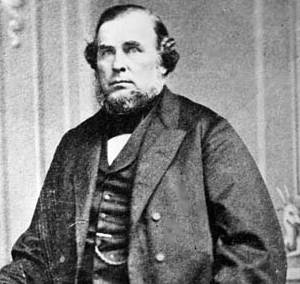
James Skead

James Skead (December 31, 1817 – July 5, 1884) was an Ontario businessman and politician. He was a Conservative member of the Senate of Canada for Rideau division from 1867 to 1881 and from 1881 until his death in 1884.

== Biography ==
He was born near Moresby, Cumbria, England in 1817 and studied there, coming to Jesus Island, Lower Canada with his father and two siblings, Robert and Mary Ann, in 1827 at ten years of age. The family later settled in Bytown, Upper Canada in 1832. Skead entered the lumber business in 1842, setting up operations on the Madawaska River. As a result of his experience in building timber slides along that river, he was contracted to design and build an advanced slide on the Ottawa River near Bytown. His lumber operations with his brother Robert expanded to include forests along the Mississippi River in Ontario.

He was elected to the city council of Ottawa in 1861; he represented Rideau division in the Legislative Council of the Province of Canada from 1862 to 1867, and was an unsuccessful candidate for Carleton for the Ontario Assembly in 1867. After Confederation in 1867, he was named to the Senate. Early in 1881, he resigned, but he was reappointed on 24 December of the same year.

In 1871, he re-built his large steam-powered sawmill on the Ottawa River at Kitchissippi Lookout; a community sprang up around it known as Skead's Mills which later became the Westboro neighborhood of Ottawa. Among extensive business interests he helped promote the Upper Ottawa Steamboat Company, later becoming its president. The honourable senator James Skead was also an investor in several railway companies as well as vice-president of the Canada Central Railway and the Montreal and City of Ottawa Junction Railway. On his farms, he raised Ayrshire and Durham cattle.

Skead was president of the Ottawa Agricultural Insurance Company and the Ontario Fruit Growers' Association. He was also a member and later president of the Ottawa Board of Trade and the Dominion Board of Trade. He was president of the Ottawa Liberal-Conservative Association, of the Liberal-Conservative convention that met in Toronto 23 September 1874, and of the Agricultural and Arts Association of Ontario.

Skead resigned from the Senate in January 1881 because he was suffering financial difficulties at the time; he was called again to the Senate later that same year and served until his death in Ottawa in 1884. He had suffered damage to his lungs when he fell from his carriage in 1882; this eventually led to his death two years later.

== Legacy ==
The community of Skead in Greater Sudbury was named for James Skead. The community was established by lumber baron W. J. Bell, who was married to Skead's daughter Katherine.

In memory of Skead, there is a street located off the Ottawa river parkway in Westboro.

In the Township of Madawaska Valley, near Barry's Bay, Ontario, Skead Road is named after James Skead, although it was mistakenly titled Skeeds Road in the past. During his life, Skead owned a timber-cutting business nearby.
