= Proclamation of the Constitution Act, 1867 =

Proclamation creating Canada

British North America Act, 1867

The Proclamation of the Constitution Act, 1867 (French: Proclamation de la Loi constitutionnelle de 1867) was a royal proclamation issued by Queen Victoria on the advice of the British government, bringing the Constitution Act, 1867 into force and creating the new country of Canada, effective July 1, 1867.

The Constitution Act, 1867 is the constitutional statute which established Canada. Originally named the British North America Act, 1867, the Act continues to be the foundational statute for the Constitution of Canada, although it has been amended many times since 1867. It is now recognised as part of the supreme law of Canada.

== Constitution Act, 1867 ==
The Constitution Act, 1867 is part of the Constitution of Canada and thus part of the supreme law of Canada. The Act sets out the constitutional structure of Canada, including creating the federal government and defining the powers of the federal government and the provinces. It was the product of extensive negotiations between the British North American provinces at the Charlottetown Conference in 1864, the Quebec Conference in 1864, and the London Conference in 1866. Those conferences were followed by consultations with the British government in 1867. The Act was then enacted in 1867 by the British Parliament under the name the British North America Act, 1867. In 1982 the Act was brought under full Canadian control through the Patriation of the Constitution, and was renamed the Constitution Act, 1867. Since Patriation the Act can only be amended in Canada, under the amending formula set out in the Constitution Act, 1982.

== Text of the Proclamation ==
The Proclamation reads:

By the QUEEN.

A PROCLAMATION for Uniting the Provinces of Canada, Nova Scotia, and New Brunswick, into one Dominion, under the name of CANADA.

WHEREAS by an Act of Parliament, passed on the twenty-ninth day of March, one thousand eight hundred and sixty-seven, in the thirtieth year of Our reign, intituled "An Act for the union of Canada, Nova Scotia, and New Brunswick, and the Government thereof, and for purposes connected therewith," after divers recitals it is enacted that "it shall be lawful for the Queen, by and with the advice of Her Majesty's Most Honourable Privy Council, to declare, by Proclamation, that on and after a day therein appointed, not being more than six months after the passing of this Act the Provinces of Canada, Nova Scotia, and New Brunswick, shall form and be One Dominion under the name of Canada, and on and after that day those Three Provinces shall form and be One Dominion under that Name accordingly:" and it is thereby further enacted, that "Such Persons shall be first summoned to the Senate as The Queen by Warrant, under Her Majesty's Royal Sign Manual, thinks fit to approve, and their Names shall be inserted in The Queen's Proclamation of Union:"

We, therefore, by and with the advice of Our Privy Council, have thought fit to issue this Our Royal Proclamation, and We do ordain, declare, and command that on and after the first day of July, one thousand eight hundred and sixty-seven, the Provinces of Canada, Nova Scotia, and New Brunswick, shall form and be One Dominion, under the name of Canada.

And We do further ordain and declare that the persons whose names are herein inserted and set forth are the persons of whom We have by Warrant under Our Royal Sign Manual thought fit to approve as the persons who shall be first summoned to the Senate of Canada.

For the Province of Ontario
John Hamilton
Roderick Matheson
John Ross
Samuel Mills
Benjamin Seymour
Walter Hamilton Dickson
James Shaw
Adam Johnston Ferguson Blair
Alexander Campbell
David Christie
James Cox Aikins
David Reesor
Elijah Leonard
William MacMaster
Asa Allworth Burnham
John Simpson
James Skead
David Lewis Macpherson
George Crawford
Donald Macdonald
Oliver Blake
Billa Flint
Walter McCrea
George William Allan

For the Province of Quebec
James Leslie
Asa Belknap Foster
Joseph Noel Bossé
Louis A. Olivier
Jacques-Olivier Bureau
Charles Malhiot
Louis Renaud
Luc Letellier de St. Just
Ulric Joseph Tessier
John Hamilton
Charles Cormier
Antoine Juchereau Duchesnay
David Edward Price
Elzear H. J. Duchesnay
Leandre Dumouchel
Louis Lacoste
Joseph F. Armand
Charles Wilson
William Henry Chaffers
Jean Baptiste Guévremont
James Ferrier
Sir Narcisse Fortunat Belleau, Knight
Thomas Ryan
John Sewell Sanborn

For the Province of Nova Scotia
Edward Kenny
Jonathan McCully
Thomas D. Archibald
Robert B. Dickey
John H. Anderson
John Holmes
John W. Ritchie
Benjamin Wier
John Locke
Caleb R. Bill
John Bourinot
William Miller

For the Province of New Brunswick
Amos Edwin Botsford
Edward Barren Chandler
John Robertson
Robert Leonard Hazen
William Hunter Odell
David Wark
William Henry Steeves
William Todd
John Ferguson
Robert Duncan Wilmot
Abner Reid McClelan
Peter Mitchell

Given at Our Court at Windsor Castle, this twenty-second day of May, in the year of our Lord, one thousand eight hundred and sixty-seven, and in the thirtieth year of Our reign.

GOD save the QUEEN.

== Purpose and interpretation ==
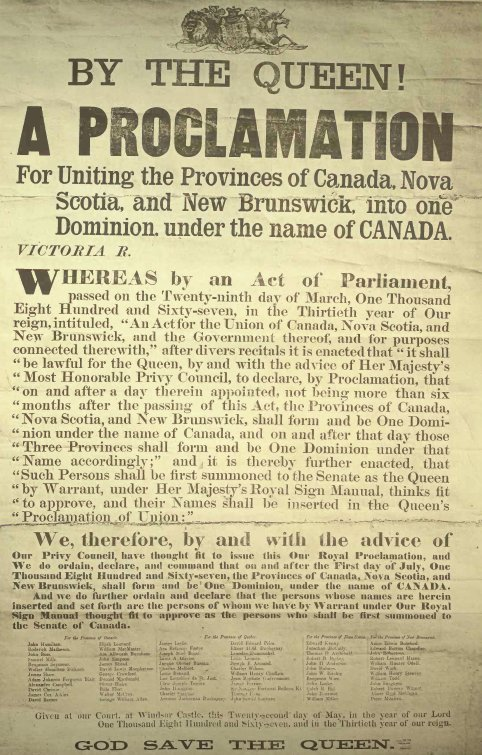
Royal Proclamation which brought the Constitution Act, 1867 into force on July 1, 1867

The Constitution Act, 1867 was passed by the British Parliament in March, 1867, receiving royal assent on March 29, 1867. However, it did not come into force immediately, as time was needed to prepare for the implementation of the new federal structure, particularly the selection of the new federal Cabinet.

Section 3 of the Act authorised the Queen, on the advice of the British government, to set the date for the coming into force of the Act. The Royal Proclamation was issued on May 22, 1867, setting July 1, 1867 as the day the Act would come into force and Canada would come into existence. Governor General Lord Monck appointed John A. Macdonald as the first prime minister of Canada. Macdonald then spent the months of May and June forming the new Cabinet, which required balancing a number of regional, sectarian, and linguistic issues. The new federal government then came into effect on July 1, 1867.

As required by section 25 of the Act, the Proclamation contained the names of the individuals who would be appointed to the Senate, prior to the first sitting of the new Parliament of Canada.

== Related provisions ==
Section 3 of the Act authorised the Queen to issue the Proclamation, acting on the advice of the British government.

Section 25 of the Act provided that the individuals listed in the Proclamation would be summoned to the Senate.
