= Louis Auguste Olivier =

Canadian politician

The Hon. Louis Auguste Olivier
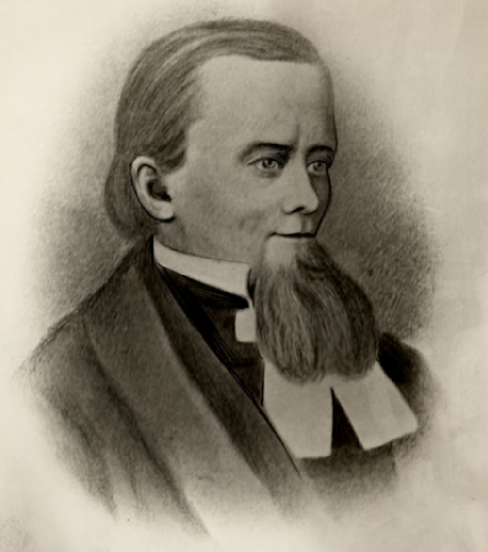

Senator for De Lanaudière, Quebec
- In office October 23, 1867 – September 8, 1873
- Appointed by: Royal Proclamation
- Succeeded by: Joseph-Hyacinthe Bellerose

Personal details
- Born: November 1, 1816 Berthier-en-Haut, Lower Canada
- Died: September 18, 1881 (aged 64) Joliette, Quebec
- Party: Liberal
- Relations: Louis Olivier, grandfather

Louis Auguste Olivier (November 1, 1816 – September 18, 1881) was a Quebec lawyer, judge and political figure. He was a Liberal member of the Senate of Canada for the De Lanaudière division from 1867 to 1873.

He was born in Berthier-en-Haut, Lower Canada in 1816, the grandson of Louis Olivier, and studied at the Séminaire de Nicolet. He was admitted to the bar in 1839 and set up practice at Berthier-en-Haut. He helped establish the newspaper Écho des campagnes there in 1846. In 1864, he was named Queen's Counsel. He was elected to the Legislative Council of the Province of Canada for Lanaudière division in an 1863 by-election and served until Confederation, when he was named to the Senate. In 1873, he resigned to accept an appointment as puisne judge in the Quebec Superior Court for Joliette district.

He died at Joliette, Quebec in 1881.

His daughter Louise married Henri-Gédéon Malhiot, who was a member of the Quebec assembly, mayor of Trois-Rivières and judge in the Quebec Superior Court.
