= Oliver Blake =

Canadian politician

The Honourable Oliver Blake
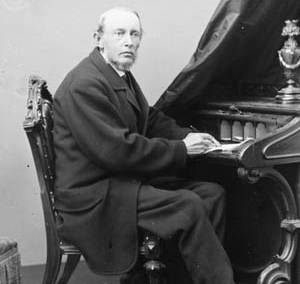

Canadian Senator from Ontario
- In office October 23, 1867 – December 10, 1873

Personal details
- Born: October 1, 1802 New Hampton, New Hampshire, U.S.
- Died: December 10, 1873 (aged 71)
- Party: Liberal
- Occupation: Politician; businessman

Oliver Blake (October 1, 1802 – December 10, 1873) was a Canadian politician and businessman. He was a Liberal member of the Senate of Canada from 1867 to 1873.

== Background ==
He was born in New Hampton, New Hampshire, United States in 1802 and came to Upper Canada while young. As a young man he sold fanning mills. Later, he was a director of the Beaver Mutual Fire Insurance Company. He was appointed court clerk in 1841; Deputy Reeve of Townsend Township in Norfolk County, Councillor of Townsend Township in 1853, and served as Reeve of Townsend Township in 1852, 1854 - 1857. Blake was elected to the Legislative Council of the Province of Canada for Thames division in 1862 and was named to the Senate after Confederation.
