= John Simpson (Ontario politician) =

Canadian politician

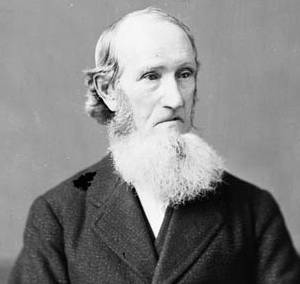
John Simpson Source: Library and Archives Canada

John Simpson (May 12, 1812 – March 21, 1885) was an Ontario businessman and political figure. He was a Liberal member of the Senate of Canada from 1867 to 1885.

He was born in Rothes, Scotland in 1812 and came to Upper Canada with his family in 1815, eventually settling in Brockville. He began work as a clerk in Charles Bowman's general store and mill at Darlington (later Bowmanville) and became Bowman's partner. Simpson excelled at the production of flour. After Bowman's death in 1848, he continued to operate the business in partnership with his brother-in-law. He became manager of the Bank of Montreal branch at Bowmanville in 1848 but became president of the newly formed Ontario Bank in 1857. Simpson served on the council for the Newcastle District and for Darlington Township. He was elected to the Legislative Council for the province in 1856 and reelected by acclamation in 1864. He was named to the Senate after Confederation and served until his death in Bowmanville in 1885.
