= Jean-Baptiste Guevremont =

Canadian politician

The Hon. Jean-Baptiste Guevremont
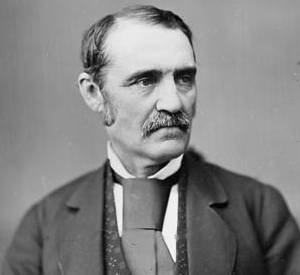

Senator for Saurel, Quebec
- In office 1867–1896
- Appointed by: Royal Proclamation
- Succeeded by: Louis-Joseph Forget

Personal details
- Born: September 4, 1826 Isle-Dupas, Lower Canada
- Died: December 5, 1896 (aged 70)
- Party: Conservative

Jean-Baptiste Guevremont [surname spelled Guévremont or Guèvremont in different sources] (September 4, 1826 – December 5, 1896) was a farmer and political figure in Canada East, who served as a member of the Senate of Canada from 1867 to 1896.

He was born at Isle-Dupas in Lower Canada in 1826. He became a farmer near Sorel in 1851. He was elected to the 5th Parliament of the Province of Canada in 1854 representing Richelieu. In 1858, he was elected to the Legislative Council representing Sorel division; the election was declared invalid in 1860 but he was re-elected in a by-election in the same year. In 1867, he was appointed to the Senate of Canada; he resigned in July 1896. In 1891, he served as mayor of Sorel.

He died at Sorel in 1896.
