= Narcisse-Fortunat Belleau =

Canadian politician (1808–1894)

The Honourable Sir Narcisse-Fortunat Belleau KCMG QC
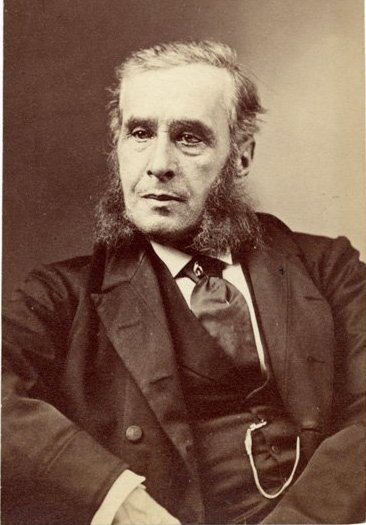
- Belleau c. 1880

1st Lieutenant Governor of Quebec
- In office July 1, 1867 – February 11, 1873
- Monarch: Victoria
- Governors General: The Viscount Monck; The Lord Lisgar; The Earl of Dufferin
- Premier: Pierre-Joseph-Olivier Chauveau
- Preceded by: Office established
- Succeeded by: René-Édouard Caron

Premier of the Province of Canada
- In office 30 July 1865 – 1867
- Preceded by: Étienne-Paschal Taché
- Succeeded by: office abolished

4th Mayor of Quebec City
- In office 11 February 1850 – 14 February 1853
- Preceded by: George Okill Stuart, Jr.
- Succeeded by: Ulric-Joseph Tessier

Personal details
- Born: October 20, 1808 Sainte-Foy, Lower Canada
- Died: September 14, 1894 (aged 85) Quebec City, Quebec, Canada
- Party: Conservative

Sir Narcisse-Fortunat Belleau KCMG QC (October 20, 1808 – September 14, 1894) was a Canadian politician who served as the first Lieutenant Governor of Quebec. Prior to Canadian Confederation, he served as the leader of the Parti bleu in Canada East.

== Early life ==
He was born in Quebec City in 1808. He studied at the Petit Séminaire de Québec and went on to article in law, receiving his license to practice in 1832. In 1835, he married Marie-Reine-Josephte, the daughter of Quebec merchant Louis Gauvreau. In 1848, he ran unsuccessfully as a Reformer in Portneuf. In the same year, he was elected to the city council for Quebec and served as mayor from 1850 to 1853. During his term as mayor, a system providing drinking water was installed in the city. He served on the board of the Quebec Bank, later merged with the Royal Bank of Canada, from 1848 to 1893.

== Political career ==
In 1852, he was appointed to the Legislative Council of the Province of Canada. He became a Queen's Counsel in 1854. In 1857, he was named speaker of the Legislative Council and so became a member of the Executive Council. He was knighted in 1860. He became premier for Canada East and receiver general in 1865 on the death of Sir Étienne-Paschal Taché and served in that role until Confederation. He was nominated for a seat in the Senate of Canada in 1867 but withdrew when he was named the first Lieutenant Governor of Quebec in July of the same year. He refused a seat in the Senate when he retired from this post in 1873. He was made a Knight Commander of the Order of St Michael and St George in 1879.

== Later life ==
After politics, Belleau continued to sit on the board of the Quebec Bank and took an active role in social functions. He maintained his political influence.

Later in life, Belleau became involved in significant litigation concerning debentures he had purchased from a Quebec toll-road company authorized under pre-Confederation legislation. When the company defaulted on the bonds, he and other bond-holders sued the federal government for payment of the principal and interest. Although the plaintiffs were successful in the Supreme Court of Canada, the decision was overturned by the Judicial Committee of the Privy Council in London, at that time the highest court of appeal for the British Empire, including Canada. In The Queen v Belleau, the Judicial Committee held that by the terms of the statute, the federal government was not liable for either principal or interest.

He died at Quebec City in 1894 and left his fortune, which contemporaries estimated as between $200,000 and $400,000, to his nephew.

Political offices
Preceded by Sir Étienne-Paschal Taché	Joint Premiers of the Province of Canada - Canada East; 1864–1867	Succeeded by Sir John Alexander Macdonald as Prime Minister of Canada and Pierre-Joseph-Olivier Chauveau as Premier of Quebec
