= John White (Conservative MP) =

Canadian politician (1833–1894)

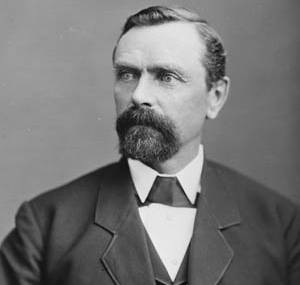
John White Source: Library and Archives Canada

John White (May 6, 1833 – September 24, 1894) was an Ontarian machinist and political figure. He represented Hastings East in the House of Commons of Canada as a Conservative member from 1871 to 1887.

He was born in Donegal, County Donegal, Ireland in 1833 and grew up there. In 1856, he married Esther Johnston. He operated a cheese factory on the Moira River near the town of Roslin. White served as reeve for Tyendinaga. He was elected to the House of Commons by acclamation in an 1871 by-election after the sitting member was named to the Senate. White was Grand Master for the Orange Lodge in Ontario East and, in 1874, became Deputy Grand Master for British North America.

He died in Victoria, British Columbia at the age of 61.

History professor Donald Akenson of Queen's University, in his book At Face Value, proposed that this John White may have actually been Eliza McCormack White, John White's sister, and so, the first woman elected to the House of Commons. Akenson later revealed the book to be a hoax based on Daniel Defoe's Moll Flanders.
