= John Hawkins Anderson =

Canadian politician

Senator for Nova Scotia
- In office October 23, 1867 – December 24, 1870

Member of the Legislative Council of Nova Scotia

Personal details
- Born: 1805
- Died: December 24, 1870 (aged 64–65)
- Party: Liberal

John Hawkins Anderson (1805 – December 24, 1870) was a member of the Legislative Council of Nova Scotia, and then a member of the Senate of Canada. A Liberal, he was appointed to the Senate on October 23, 1867 by a royal proclamation of Queen Victoria following Canadian Confederation earlier that year. He represented the senatorial division of Nova Scotia until his death.
