= Joseph-François Armand =

Canadian politician

The Honourable Joseph-François Armand
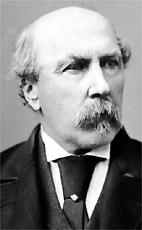

Canadian Senator from Quebec (Repentigny)
- In office October 23, 1867 – January 1, 1903
- Appointed by: Royal Proclamation
- Succeeded by: Joseph-Hormisdas Legris

Member of the Legislative Council of the Province of Canada for Alma
- In office 1858–1867

Personal details
- Born: December 14, 1820 Rivière-des-Prairies, Lower Canada
- Died: January 1, 1903 (aged 82) Montreal, Quebec, Canada
- Party: Conservative

Joseph-François Armand (14 December 1820 – 1 January 1903) was a member of the Senate of Canada. Born Joseph-Flavien Armand in Rivière-des-Prairies, Lower Canada, he was a farmer before entering politics. In 1858, he was elected to the Legislative Council of the Province of Canada in the Alma division and served until 1867. A Conservative, he was appointed to the Senate on 23 October 1867 by a royal proclamation of Queen Victoria following Canadian Confederation earlier that year. He represented the senatorial division of Repentigny, Quebec until his death.
