= Thomas Dickson Archibald =

Canadian politician (1813–1890)

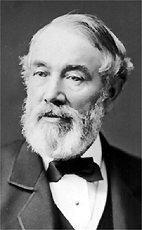
- Archibald, photographed by William James Topley

Senator
- Incumbent
- Assumed office October 1867

Legislative Council of Nova Scotia
- In office 1854–1867

Executive Council of Nova Scotia
- In office 1860–1863

Thomas Dickson Archibald (8 April 1813 – 18 October 1890) was a Canadian businessman, politician, and senator.

Born in Onslow, Nova Scotia, Archibald had by the early 1830s established himself as a businessman in the area surrounding Sydney, on Cape Breton Island, engaging in merchandising and goods transportation by ship. In 1854 he was appointed to the Legislative Council of Nova Scotia, and was its chairman in 1861. In 1860 he was appointed to the Executive Council of Nova Scotia for three years. In 1867 he was appointed to the Senate of Canada and sat as a Liberal-Conservative. He died in Sydney Mines, Nova Scotia.

== Early life and merchant career ==
Archibald was born in Onslow, Nova Scotia, on 8 April 1813. His parents were David Archibald and Olivia Dickson, and he was their fourth son. He attended Pictou Academy.

He then worked for General Mining Association's offices at Stellarton, Nova Scotia. He moved to Sydney Mines in 1832 to become a businessman in merchandising, mining, and building ships in North Sydney, Nova Scotia. By 1841 he was working for Archibald and Company, co-founded by his brother Samuel, and worked with many of his relatives there. The firm focused on merchants, agents for coal sales, and agents for the North Sydney Marine Railway. He became a chief partner of the firm by 1853. Archibald was also an agent for British and American insurance companies and the Bank of Nova Scotia. He also purchased vessels, and between 1842–1889 he owned one-fifth of the shipping capacity in Sydney, mostly wooden sailing ships.

== Political career ==
In 1854 there was a vacancy for the Legislative Council of Nova Scotia, and the Cape Breton News, a paper on Cape Breton Island, campaigned for the seat to be filled by someone from the island. Archibald was appointed later that year, remaining on the council until 1867, and was its chairman in 1861. He became involved with the termination of General Mining Association's monopoly in Nova Scotia in 1858 and 1859. He advocated for residents on Cape Breton Island to continue to mine for coal on their property after the end of the monopoly. This event also allowed other firms, such as Archibald's Gowrie Mines, to open new coalfields on the island. Archibald opposed bills that would equalize the electoral weight of counties in Nova Scotia and allow French fishermen, subsidized by their government to sell their products duty-free. He also opposed increasing the penalties for violating liquor licensing laws, stating sarcastically, "we need only go a step further and make the violation a hanging matter."

In 1860 he was appointed to the Executive Council of Nova Scotia, serving there for three years. He favoured Nova Scotia's entry into Canadian Confederation. In October 1867 he was appointed by royal proclamation to the Canadian Senate to represent North Sydney. He was affiliated with the Liberal-Conservative Party. He was also appointed as the United States Consul in Sydney.

== Personal life and death ==
Archibald married Susan Elizabeth Corbett on 14 November 1839, and they had seven children, including Edward, Thomas, Blowers, William, and a daughter named Emma. Corbett died, and Archibald married Elizabeth Hughes on 10 June 1867. His final marriage was to Maria Louisa Burnyeat, née Goudge on 2 June 1874.

He died in Sydney Mines, Nova Scotia on 18 October 1890.
