= Women in the 24th Canadian Parliament =

The number of women sitting in the House of Commons increased to five during the 24th Canadian Parliament; the number of women senators increased to seven. 21 women ran for seats in the Canadian House of Commons in the 1958 federal election; the two women incumbents were reelected. Three more women were elected in by-elections held following the general election: Jean Casselman Wadds in September 1958, Judy LaMarsh in October 1960, and Margaret Mary Macdonald in May 1961.

Two additional women: Olive Lillian Irvine and Josie Alice Quart were named to the Canadian senate in January 1960. Cairine Wilson died in March 1962, which brought the number of women senators to six.

== Party Standings ==
Party	Total women candidates	% women candidates of total candidates	Total women elected	% women elected of total women candidates	% women elected of total elected
Liberal	8 (of 264)	3.0%	0 (of 48)	0%	0%
Co-operative Commonwealth Federation	8 (of 169)	4.7%	0 (of 8)	0%	0%
Progressive Conservative	3 (of 265)	1.1%	2 (of 208)	66.7%	1.8%
Social Credit	2 (of 82)	2.4%	0 (of 0)	0%	-
Table source:

== Members of the House of Commons ==
Name	Party	Electoral district	Notes
Margaret Aitken	Progressive Conservative	York—Humber
Ellen Fairclough	Progressive Conservative	Hamilton West	cabinet member
Judy LaMarsh	Liberal	Niagara Falls	by-election
Margaret Mary Macdonald	Progressive Conservative	King's	by-election, first woman MP from PEI
Jean Casselman Wadds	Progressive Conservative	Grenville—Dundas	by-election

== Senators ==
Senator	Appointed on the advice of	Term	from	Party
Cairine Wilson	King	1930.02.15 - 1962.03.03	Ontario	Liberal
Muriel McQueen Fergusson	St. Laurent	1953.05.19 - 1975.05.23	New Brunswick	Liberal
Mariana Beauchamp Jodoin	St. Laurent	1953.05.19 - 1966.06.01	Quebec	Liberal
Nancy Hodges	St. Laurent	1953.11.05 - 1965.06.12	British Columbia	Liberal
Florence Elsie Inman	St. Laurent	1955.07.28 - 1986.05.31	Prince Edward Island	Liberal
Olive Lillian Irvine	Diefenbaker	1960.01.14 - 1969.11.01	Manitoba	Progressive Conservative
Josie Alice Quart	Diefenbaker	1960.01.14 - 1969.11.01	Quebec	Progressive Conservative
