= Women in the 28th–32nd Canadian Parliaments =

Women were first allowed to vote at the federal level in Canada in the 1917 general election in connection with military service, and were allowed to vote under the same conditions as men beginning on May 24, 1918. The next four elections saw only one woman elected: Agnes Macphail. The 1936 election saw two women in the House together for the first time. A by-election in 1941 saw a woman elected to the governing caucus for the first time. The 22nd federal election in 1953 was a slight breakthrough, electing four women, which was 1.5% of the House. Every Parliament thenafter would have at least two women at a time, except for the 28th Parliament from 1968 to 1972, in which Grace MacInnis was the only woman. Then 30th Parliament, elected in 1974, was another breakthrough, containing nine women MPs following the general election and rising to ten due to a by-election in 1976. The number of women in the House would not fall below ten again.

Meanwhile, in the Senate, Cairine Wilson was appointed as the first woman Senator in 1930. Additional women were added every few years, but it was not until two appointments in March 1979 that the Senate would even have ten women serving simultaneously.

== Members of the House of Commons ==
Parliament	House members	Party	Riding
28th Parliament of Canada; 0.4% women MPs	Grace MacInnis	New Democrat	Vancouver Kingsway, BC
29th Parliament of Canada; 1.9% women MPs	Monique Bégin	Liberal	Saint-Michel, QC
29th Parliament of Canada; 1.9% women MPs	Flora MacDonald	Progressive Conservative	Kingston and the Islands, ON
29th Parliament of Canada; 1.9% women MPs	Grace MacInnis	New Democrat	Vancouver Kingsway, BC
29th Parliament of Canada; 1.9% women MPs	Albanie Morin	Liberal	Louis-Hébert, QC
29th Parliament of Canada; 1.9% women MPs	Jeanne Sauvé	Liberal	Ahuntsic, QC
30th Parliament of Canada; 3.8% women MPs	Ursula Appolloni	Liberal	York South, ON
30th Parliament of Canada; 3.8% women MPs	Monique Bégin	Liberal	Saint-Michel, QC
30th Parliament of Canada; 3.8% women MPs	Iona Campagnolo	Liberal	Skeena, BC
30th Parliament of Canada; 3.8% women MPs	Coline Campbell	Liberal	South Western Nova, NS
30th Parliament of Canada; 3.8% women MPs	Simma Holt	Liberal	Vancouver Kingsway, BC
30th Parliament of Canada; 3.8% women MPs	Flora MacDonald	Progressive Conservative	Kingston and the Islands, ON
30th Parliament of Canada; 3.8% women MPs	Albanie Morin	Liberal	Louis-Hébert, QC
30th Parliament of Canada; 3.8% women MPs	Aideen Nicholson	Liberal	Trinity, ON
30th Parliament of Canada; 3.8% women MPs	Jean Pigott*	Progressive Conservative	Ottawa—Carleton, ON
30th Parliament of Canada; 3.8% women MPs	Jeanne Sauvé	Liberal	Ahuntsic, QC
31st Parliament of Canada; 3.5% women MPs	Ursula Appolloni	Liberal	York South—Weston, ON
31st Parliament of Canada; 3.5% women MPs	Monique Bégin	Liberal	Saint-Léonard—Anjou, QC
31st Parliament of Canada; 3.5% women MPs	Céline Hervieux-Payette	Liberal	Mercier, QC
31st Parliament of Canada; 3.5% women MPs	Pauline Jewett	NDP	New Westminster—Coquitlam, BC
31st Parliament of Canada; 3.5% women MPs	Marie Thérèse Killens	Liberal	Saint-Michel, QC
31st Parliament of Canada; 3.5% women MPs	Flora MacDonald	Progressive Conservative	Kingston and the Islands, ON
31st Parliament of Canada; 3.5% women MPs	Margaret Mitchell	NDP	Vancouver East, BC
31st Parliament of Canada; 3.5% women MPs	Aideen Nicholson	Liberal	Trinity, ON
31st Parliament of Canada; 3.5% women MPs	Jeanne Sauvé	Liberal	Laval-des-Rapides, QC
31st Parliament of Canada; 3.5% women MPs	Diane Stratas	Progressive Conservative	Scarborough Centre, ON
32nd Parliament of Canada; 5.6% women MPs	Ursula Appolloni	Liberal	York South-Weston, ON
32nd Parliament of Canada; 5.6% women MPs	Suzanne Beauchamp-Niquet	Liberal	Roberval, QC
32nd Parliament of Canada; 5.6% women MPs	Monique Bégin	Liberal	Saint-Michel, QC
32nd Parliament of Canada; 5.6% women MPs	Coline Campbell	Liberal	South West Nova, NS
32nd Parliament of Canada; 5.6% women MPs	Pat Carney	Progressive Conservative	Vancouver Centre, BC
32nd Parliament of Canada; 5.6% women MPs	Eva Côté	Liberal	Rimouski, QC
32nd Parliament of Canada; 5.6% women MPs	Judy Erola	Liberal	Nickel Belt, ON
32nd Parliament of Canada; 5.6% women MPs	Céline Hervieux-Payette	Liberal	Mercier, QC
32nd Parliament of Canada; 5.6% women MPs	Pauline Jewett	NDP	New Westminster—Coquitlam, BC
32nd Parliament of Canada; 5.6% women MPs	Marie Thérèse Killens	Liberal	Saint-Michel, QC
32nd Parliament of Canada; 5.6% women MPs	Flora MacDonald	Progressive Conservative	Kingston and the Islands, ON
32nd Parliament of Canada; 5.6% women MPs	Lynn McDonald*	NDP	Broadview—Greenwood, ON
32nd Parliament of Canada; 5.6% women MPs	Margaret Mitchell	NDP	Vancouver East, BC
32nd Parliament of Canada; 5.6% women MPs	Aideen Nicholson	Liberal	Trinity, ON
32nd Parliament of Canada; 5.6% women MPs	Jeanne Sauvé	Liberal	Ahuntsic, QC

* By by-election.

== Senators ==
Senator	Parliaments	Appointed on the advice of	Term	Designation	Party
Margaret Jean Anderson	30th–34th	Trudeau, P.	1978.03.23 - 1990.08.07	Northumberland-Miramichi, NB	Liberal
Ann Bell	28th–34th	Trudeau, P.	1970.10.07 - 1989.11.29	Nanaimo-Malaspina, BC	Liberal
Martha Bielish	31st–34th	Clark	1979.09.27 - 1990.09.26	Lakeland, AB	Progressive Conservative
Florence Bayard Bird	30th–32nd	Trudeau, P.	1978.03.23 - 1983.01.15	Carleton, ON	Liberal
Thérèse Casgrain	28th	Trudeau, P.	1970.10.07 - 1971.07.10	Mille Isles, QC	Independent
Anne Cools	32nd–42nd	Trudeau, P.	1984.01.13 - 2018.08.12	Toronto Centre-York, ON	Liberal (until 2004)
Joyce Fairbairn	32nd–41st	Trudeau, P.	1984.06.29 - 2013.01.18	Lethbridge, AB	Liberal
Iva Campbell Fallis	17th–22nd	Bennett	1935.07.20 - 1956.03.07	Peterborough, ON	Conservative
Muriel McQueen Fergusson	21st–29th	St. Laurent	1953.05.19 - 1975.05.23	Fredericton, NB	Liberal
Nancy Hodges	22nd–26th	St. Laurent	1953.11.05 - 1965.06.12	Victoria, BC	Liberal
Florence Elsie Inman	22nd–33rd	St. Laurent	1955.07.28 - 1986.05.31	Murray Harbour, PE	Liberal
Olive Lillian Irvine	24th–28th	Diefenbaker	1960.01.14 - 1969.11.01	Lisgar, MB	Progressive Conservative
Mariana Beauchamp Jodoin	21st–27th	St. Laurent	1953.05.19 - 1975.05.23	Saurel, QC	Liberal
Mary Elizabeth Kinnear	27th–29th	Pearson	1967.04.06 - 1973.04.03	Welland, ON	Liberal
Renaude Lapointe	28th–33rd	Trudeau, P.	1971.11.10 - 1987.01.03	Mille Isles, QC	Liberal
Lorna Marsden	32nd–34th	Trudeau, P.	1984.01.24 - 1992.08.31	Toronto Centre-York, Ontario	Liberal
Joan Neiman	28th–36th	Trudeau, P.	1972.09.01 - 1995.09.09	Peel, ON	Liberal
Margaret Norrie	28th–32nd	Trudeau, P.	1972.04.27 - 1980.10.16	Colchester-Cumberland, NS	Liberal
Josie Alice Quart	24th–28th	Diefenbaker	1960.01.14 - 1969.11.01	Victoria, QC	Progressive Conservative
Yvette Boucher Rousseau	30th–33rd	Trudeau, P.	1979.03.27 - 1988.03.17	De Salaberry, QC	Liberal
Cairine Wilson	16th–24th	King	1930.02.15 - 1962.03.03	Rockcliffe, ON	Liberal
Dalia Wood	30th–36th	Trudeau, P.	1979.03.26 - 1999.01.31	Montarville, QC	Liberal

== See also ==
- Women in Canadian politics
- Women in Canadian provincial and territorial legislatures
