= Women in the 27th Canadian Parliament =

The number of women sitting in the House of Commons decreased to four during the 27th Canadian Parliament; the number of women senators returned to six. 37 women ran for seats in the Canadian House of Commons in the 1965 federal election; three women out of six incumbents were reelected. Pauline Jewett and Margaret Konantz were defeated when they ran for reelection; Eloise Jones did not run for reelection. Grace MacInnis was also elected to the House of Commons in the general election, becoming the first woman elected to the House of Commons from British Columbia.

Mary Elizabeth Kinnear was named to the Canadian senate in April 1967, bringing the number of women senators to six. Mariana Beauchamp Jodoin resigned her seat in June 1966, decreasing the number of women in the Senate to five.

== Party Standings ==
Party	Total women candidates	% women candidates of total candidates	Total women elected	% women elected of total women candidates	% women elected of total elected
NDP	16 (of 255)	6.3%	1 (of 21)	6.3%	4.8%
Liberal	8 (of 265)	3.0%	2 (of 131)	25%	1.5%
Progressive Conservative	8 (of 265)	3.0%	1 (of 97)	12.5%	1.0%
Social Credit	3 (of 86)	3.5%	0 (of 24)	0%	0%
Independent Liberal	1 (of 10)	10%	0 (of 0)	0%	-
Communist Party of Canada	1 (of 12)	8.3%	0 (of 0)	0%	-
Table source:

== Members of the House of Commons ==
Name	Party	Electoral district	Notes
Judy LaMarsh	Liberal	Niagara Falls	cabinet minister
Grace MacInnis	NDP	Vancouver Kingsway	first woman MP elected from British Columbia
Margaret Rideout	Liberal	Westmorland	
Jean Casselman Wadds	Progressive Conservative	Grenville—Dundas	

== Senators ==
Senator	Appointed on the advice of	Term	from	Party
Muriel McQueen Fergusson	St. Laurent	1953.05.19 - 1975.05.23	New Brunswick	Liberal
Mariana Beauchamp Jodoin	St. Laurent	1953.05.19 - 1966.06.01	Quebec	Liberal
Florence Elsie Inman	St. Laurent	1955.07.28 - 1986.05.31	Prince Edward Island	Liberal
Olive Lillian Irvine	Diefenbaker	1960.01.14 - 1969.11.01	Manitoba	Progressive Conservative
Josie Alice Quart	Diefenbaker	1960.01.14 - 1969.11.01	Quebec	Progressive Conservative
Mary Elizabeth Kinnear	Pearson	1967.04.06 - 1973.04.03	Ontario	Liberal
