= Women in the 26th Canadian Parliament =

The number of women sitting in the House of Commons increased to six during the 26th Canadian Parliament; the number of women senators remained at six. 40 women ran for seats in the Canadian House of Commons in the 1963 federal election; two women out of five incumbents were reelected. Ellen Fairclough, Isabel Hardie and Margaret Mary Macdonald were defeated when they ran for reelection. Pauline Jewett and Margaret Konantz were elected to the House of Commons in the general election; Eloise Jones and Margaret Rideout were elected in by-elections held in June 1964.

Judy LaMarsh was named to the Canadian cabinet, becoming the second woman to serve as a federal cabinet minister.

Nancy Hodges resigned her seat in the Senate in June 1965, reducing the number of women senators to five.

== Party Standings ==
Party	Total women candidates	% women candidates of total candidates	Total women elected	% women elected of total women candidates	% women elected of total elected
NDP	13 (of 232)	5.6%	0 (of 17)	0%	0%
Progressive Conservative	12 (of 265)	4.5%	1 (of 95)	8.3%	1.1%
Liberal	6 (of 265)	2.3%	3 (of 128)	50%	2.3%
Social Credit	6 (of 224)	2.7%	0 (of 24)	0%	0%
Independent	2 (of 9)	22.2%	0 (of 0)	0%	-
Communist Party of Canada	1 (of 12)	8.3%	0 (of 0)	0%	-
Table source:

== Members of the House of Commons ==
Name	Party	Electoral district	Notes
Pauline Jewett	Liberal	Northumberland
Eloise Jones	Progressive Conservative	Saskatoon	by-election
Margaret Konantz	Liberal	Winnipeg South	first woman MP from Manitoba
Judy LaMarsh	Liberal	Niagara Falls	cabinet minister
Margaret Rideout	Liberal	Westmorland	by-election; first woman MP from New Brunswick
Jean Casselman Wadds	Progressive Conservative	Grenville—Dundas

== Senators ==
Senator	Appointed on the advice of	Term	from	Party
Muriel McQueen Fergusson	St. Laurent	1953.05.19 - 1975.05.23	New Brunswick	Liberal
Mariana Beauchamp Jodoin	St. Laurent	1953.05.19 - 1966.06.01	Quebec	Liberal
Nancy Hodges	St. Laurent	1953.11.05 - 1965.06.12	British Columbia	Liberal
Florence Elsie Inman	St. Laurent	1955.07.28 - 1986.05.31	Prince Edward Island	Liberal
Olive Lillian Irvine	Diefenbaker	1960.01.14 - 1969.11.01	Manitoba	Progressive Conservative
Josie Alice Quart	Diefenbaker	1960.01.14 - 1969.11.01	Quebec	Progressive Conservative
