= Women in the 25th Canadian Parliament =

The number of women sitting in the House of Commons remained at five during the 25th Canadian Parliament; the number of women senators remained at six. 26 women ran for seats in the Canadian House of Commons in the 1962 federal election; four women out of five incumbents were reelected. Margaret Aitken was defeated when she ran for reelection; Isabel Hardie became the first woman elected to the House of Commons from the Northwest Territories.

== Party Standings ==
Party	Total women candidates	% women candidates of total candidates	Total women elected	% women elected of total women candidates	% women elected of total elected
Progressive Conservative	7 (of 265)	2.6%	3 (of 116)	42.9%	2.6%
NDP	7 (of 218)	3.2%	0 (of 19)	0%	0%
Liberal	6 (of 263)	2.3%	2 (of 99)	33.3%	2.0%
Social Credit	4 (of 230)	1.7%	0 (of 30)	0%	0%
Independent	1 (of 11)	9.1%	0 (of 0)	0%	-
Communist Party of Canada	1 (of 12)	8.3%	0 (of 0)	0%	-
Table source:

== Members of the House of Commons ==
Name	Party	Electoral district	Notes
Ellen Fairclough	Progressive Conservative	Hamilton West	cabinet member
Isabel Hardie	Liberal	Northwest Territories	first woman MP from NWT
Judy LaMarsh	Liberal	Niagara Falls
Margaret Mary Macdonald	Progressive Conservative	King's
Jean Casselman Wadds	Progressive Conservative	Grenville—Dundas

== Senators ==
Senator	Appointed on the advice of	Term	from	Party
Muriel McQueen Fergusson	St. Laurent	1953.05.19 - 1975.05.23	New Brunswick	Liberal
Mariana Beauchamp Jodoin	St. Laurent	1953.05.19 - 1966.06.01	Quebec	Liberal
Nancy Hodges	St. Laurent	1953.11.05 - 1965.06.12	British Columbia	Liberal
Florence Elsie Inman	St. Laurent	1955.07.28 - 1986.05.31	Prince Edward Island	Liberal
Olive Lillian Irvine	Diefenbaker	1960.01.14 - 1969.11.01	Manitoba	Progressive Conservative
Josie Alice Quart	Diefenbaker	1960.01.14 - 1969.11.01	Quebec	Progressive Conservative
