= Women in Canadian politics =

Representation by women has been a significant issue in Canadian politics since 1900.

The first woman elected to a provincial legislature in Canada was Louise McKinney in the 1917 Alberta general election, while the first woman elected to the House of Commons was Agnes Macphail, in the 1921 Canadian federal election. Although female representation in politics has massively increased since then, and political parties have identified increasing the number of female candidates as an organizational and political goal, women are still underrepresented in politics compared to the general population. Canada has had one woman prime minister, Kim Campbell.

Political parties have occasionally achieved balanced representation in their elected caucuses, but mainly as a byproduct of a party collapse – for example, in the 1993 election, the Progressive Conservatives achieved gender parity in their elected caucus, but only by virtue of electing just two Members of Parliament nationwide and losing official party status. At various times, parties have also had 100 per cent female representation in their caucuses, but again only by virtue of having a caucus that consisted of just one or two members.

The Yukon New Democratic Party attained the distinction, in the 2011 Yukon general election, of becoming the first party with official party status ever to have an elected caucus that reached or exceeded parity between women and men, with four women and two men elected as MLAs. The Alberta New Democratic Party attained the distinction, in the 2015 Alberta general election, of coming the closest that a governing party caucus has ever come to attaining gender balance — the party's caucus had 25 women and 28 men, representing a caucus that was 47 per cent female.

The non-partisan consensus government of the Northwest Territories achieved near gender parity across the entire legislature in the 2019 Northwest Territories general election, with nine women and 10 men elected as MLAs; at the first formal meeting of the legislative assembly, the MLAs selected a woman, Caroline Cochrane, as premier, and chose women for four of the six cabinet roles. After one of the 10 male MLAs resigned his seat in 2021, the resulting by-election was won by a woman, making the Northwest Territories the first jurisdiction in Canadian history to have an outright majority of its legislators be women.

As of 2010, Canada ranked 50th in the world for women's participation in politics, with women holding 23 per cent of the seats in federal, provincial and territorial legislatures. At the federal level, Canada was tied with Mauritania for 49th place.

== Federal politics ==
At the federal level, women first earned the right to vote in 1917, albeit in a limited capacity: the franchise was only extended to those who were in active military service or related to a man who was. This was followed by full suffrage in 1918, and the right to stand for election to the House of Commons in 1919.

In the 1921 election, the first general election where women had full participation, five women stood as candidates: Harriet Dick, Rose Mary Henderson, Elizabeth Bethune Kiely, Agnes Macphail and Harriet Dunlop Prenter. Macphail was the only one successful in winning a seat, and she became the first woman to be elected into the House of Commons. Macphail was re-elected in the next four elections, and was the only woman in the House of Commons until the 1935 election, when she was joined by Martha Black.

In the 1940 election, Macphail was defeated and Black did not stand as a candidate, but Dorise Nielsen was elected, and Cora Taylor Casselman was elected in a 1941 Edmonton by-election to succeed her late husband. On March 13, 1944, Casselman became the first woman ever to preside over the House of Commons as acting Speaker, on an occasion when speaker James Allison Glen had to briefly step away from the chair and deputy speaker Joseph-Arthur Bradette was unavailable.

Nielsen and Casselman were both defeated in 1945, but Gladys Strum was elected that year. Strum, in turn, was defeated in 1949, the only election after 1921 in which no female candidates were elected to Parliament at all. However, Ellen Fairclough was elected to the House in a by-election the following year.

In the subsequent 1953 election, four women – Fairclough, Margaret Aitken, Sybil Bennett and Ann Shipley – were elected to Parliament. Every subsequent election has had at least two women elected to Parliament, except 1968 when Grace MacInnis was the only woman elected.

Shipley became, in 1955, the first woman in Canadian history to introduce the formal motion to accept the Speech from the Throne of the government of Louis St. Laurent.

Fairclough became, in 1957, the first woman appointed to the Cabinet of Canada by John Diefenbaker; she was also named as Acting Prime Minister for two days in 1958 while the PM was out of the country on a state visit, the first woman ever to be given that duty.

The number of women elected to the House reached double digits for the first time in the 1979 election, when 10 women were elected, and among those, Flora MacDonald. When Joe Clark became Prime Minister of Canada in 1979, MacDonald was appointed by him the first female Secretary of State for External Affairs in Canadian history, and one of the first female foreign ministers anywhere in the world.

In 1980, Jeanne Sauvé was appointed the first female speaker of the House of Commons in the 32nd Canadian Parliament. In 1984, her leader, Prime Minister Pierre Elliot Trudeau advised Queen Elizabeth II to make her the Governor General of Canada, which title she assumed (after resigning her seat in Parliament) on 28 January 1984. Sauvé would continue as vicereine until Christmas 1989.

In 1993, Kim Campbell became the first woman to be appointed Prime Minister of Canada when she was passed the torch by Brian Mulroney. She lost the subsequent general election.

Federally, the 2021 election holds the record for the most female candidates in a single election, with 582 women running for office that year. In terms of women elected to the House of Commons, the 2021 election also holds the record, with 103 successful female candidates.

Of the major federal political parties, the New Democratic Party has nominated the most female candidates in every election since its creation, except in the 1962 election, when it tied with the Progressive Conservatives, and the 2008 election, when the Liberals nominated the most female candidates for the first time in their history. The Marxist-Leninist Party of Canada nominated more women than the New Democrats in 1979 and 1980, although they are a minor party who have never won a seat in the House of Commons. Between the 1935 and 1958 elections, the top ranking was consistently held by either the Co-operative Commonwealth Federation or the Labor-Progressive Party.

=== Leadership ===
Kathryn Cholette of the Green Party was the first woman ever to win the leadership of a federal political party, and Audrey McLaughlin of the New Democratic Party was the first woman to win the leadership of a party with seats in the House of Commons.

Canada has had one woman prime minister, Kim Campbell. She became prime minister before the 1993 federal election by winning the leadership of the governing Progressive Conservatives, but lost the subsequent general election. No woman has yet been elected Prime Minister of Canada in a general election.

Three women — Sheila Copps, Anne McLellan, and Chrystia Freeland — have served as deputy prime minister.

Several women, including Mary Walker-Sawka, Rosemary Brown and Flora MacDonald, have run for the leadership of federal political parties. Brown was the first black woman to ever run for leadership of a federal political party. MacDonald unwittingly lent her name to a political phenomenon known as "Flora Syndrome" when some of her own committed delegates at the 1976 Progressive Conservative leadership election decided not to vote for her, a loss of support which some commentators attributed to sexism.

Four women — Deborah Grey, Nycole Turmel, Rona Ambrose and Candice Bergen — have served as Leader of the Official Opposition. All of the women served as interim leaders of their parties during leadership campaigns; however, Grey was an acting Leader of the Official Opposition.

Four other women have served as leaders of political parties in the House of Commons: Alexa McDonough, who succeeded McLaughlin as leader of the New Democratic Party in 1995; Elsie Wayne, who served as interim leader of the Progressive Conservatives in 1998; Elizabeth May, who entered the House of Commons in the 2011 election as the leader and first elected MP of the Green Party; and Candice Bergen, who served as interim leader of the Conservative Party of Canada following the resignation of Erin O'Toole.

Two smaller political parties which, as of 2025 do not hold any seats in the House of Commons are also led by women:

- Communist Party of Canada (Marxist-Leninist) – Anna Di Carlo
- Animal Alliance Environment Voters Party of Canada – Liz White

This dearth of women in political leadership may, in some ways, be attributable to women's general exclusion from important cabinet positions that are seen as stepping stones to leadership. Women were largely excluded from Canadian cabinets until the 1970s. Only in rare instances do women comprise a significant proportion of Canadian cabinets, as in the case of then-Ontario Premier Bob Rae's first cabinet in 1990, in which 11 of 26 ministers were women. As of July 2013, the Harper Cabinet had 11 female ministers in a cabinet of 39, though most held minor portfolios; in October 2015, Justin Trudeau became the first prime minister to appoint a fully gender-balanced cabinet with equal numbers of both men and women.

=== Senate ===
Although women gained the right to stand for election to the House of Commons in 1918, women did not have the right to be appointed to the Senate of Canada until 1929, when Edwards v Canada (AG) (commonly known as the Persons Case) was decided. The following year, Cairine Wilson was appointed as the first woman to sit in the Senate. In 1955, Wilson achieved another first, becoming the first woman to become Deputy Speaker of the Senate.

The first female Speaker of the Senate was Muriel McQueen Fergusson, who served in the role from 1972 to 1974.

In 1993, Joyce Fairbairn became the first female senator to be named Leader of the Government in the Senate. She held the role until 1997. Two more women have since had the role: Sharon Carstairs (2001–2003) and Marjory LeBreton (2006–2013).

The Famous Five, a group of five women whose activism originally secured the right of women to be named to the Senate, were posthumously named as honorary senators in 2009. The women – Emily Murphy, Henrietta Muir Edwards, Nellie McClung, Irene Parlby and Louise McKinney – are the only people in the history of the Senate to be given this honor.

In November 2020, the Senate briefly reached gender parity, with 47 male and 47 female members.

== Provincial and territorial politics ==
The first woman elected to a provincial legislature was Louise McKinney, who was elected to the Legislative Assembly of Alberta in 1917 to represent the electoral district of Claresholm as a farmers' Non-Partisan League representative. McKinney's victory was certified prior to the election of another woman, Roberta MacAdams, in the same election. MacAdams was elected to a special temporary seat allotted to soldiers and nurses serving in World War I. McKinney and MacAdams were the first two women elected in the British Commonwealth.

MacAdams was the first woman in the British Empire to introduce a piece of legislation for debate.

The first woman to serve as a provincial cabinet minister was Mary Ellen Smith, who was elected to the Legislative Assembly of British Columbia in 1918 and was appointed to the BC government cabinet in 1921. Irene Parlby (elected in the 1921 Alberta general election) and Smith were the first two women in the entire British Empire to hold cabinet posts.

Nancy Hodges became the first woman in both Canada and the Commonwealth of Nations to be elected as the Speaker of a legislature — although Smith had also previously served a short stint as Acting Speaker, and was similarly the first woman in both Canada and the British Empire to do so.

Hilda Watson, who became the first leader of the newly formed Progressive Conservative Party in the Yukon, led her party to victory in the 1978 territorial election, the territory's first partisan legislative election – however, she was defeated in her own riding by another woman, Alice McGuire, and therefore did not become government leader.

Women serving as leaders of political parties which hold legislative seats at the provincial level as of January 2025
Leaders	Political Party	Province
Carla Beck	New Democratic Party	Saskatchewan
Susan Holt	Liberal Party	New Brunswick
Claudia Chender	New Democratic Party	Nova Scotia
Ruba Ghazal	Québec solidaire	Quebec
Danielle Smith	United Conservative Party	Alberta
Bonnie Crombie	Ontario Liberal Party	Ontario
Marit Stiles	New Democratic Party	Ontario
Kate White	New Democratic Party	Yukon

As of 2025, Susan Holt is the premier of New Brunswick. Smith is Premier of Alberta; Beck, Chender and Stiles are the leaders of the Official Opposition in their provinces; White and Crombie lead third parties; and Ghazal is co-leader of a third party that maintains a tradition of always having both a male and a female co-leader.

As of November 2023, seven women are deputy premiers: Diane Archie in the Northwest Territories, Siobhán Coady in Newfoundland and Labrador, Sylvia Jones in Ontario, Geneviève Guilbault in Quebec, Donna Harpauer in Saskatchewan, Jeanie McLean in Yukon and Pamela Gross in Nunavut.

The Northwest Territories and Nunavut often have the smallest percentages of female members of any legislature in Canada; however, women's representation made significant breakthroughs in the 2017 Nunavut general election and the 2019 Northwest Territories general election.

In the 2017 Nunavut election six women were elected, vaulting the territory to 27 per cent female representation in the legislature and marking the first time in the territory's history that it ranked higher than last or second-last for female representation among Canada's provinces and territories.

In the Northwest Territories, a woman was not elected to any district outside of Yellowknife and Hay River, the two largest and most urbanized communities in the territory, in any election between 1995 and 2019. In the 2019 Northwest Territories general election, however, the territory went from just two female MLAs before the election, ranking dead last in all of Canada for female representation in the legislature, to electing nine women, reaching virtual gender parity in the 19-seat legislature and immediately vaulting to the highest percentage of female representation in all of Canada. On July 27, 2021, following the resignation of Jackson Lafferty and the by-election victory of Jane Weyallon Armstrong, the Legislative Assembly had a majority of women legislators— a first in Canada.

=== Women as premiers ===
As of 2024, 15 women have been the premier of a province or territory in Canada. The first female premier was Rita Johnston, who was Premier of British Columbia for seven months in 1991 after she won the leadership of the governing Social Credit Party, but the party was defeated in the subsequent general election. The first woman to win a general election was Catherine Callbeck in Prince Edward Island in 1993.

As of 2024, the most common path for a woman to becoming premier or prime minister has been to win the leadership of the party that was already in power, thus immediately becoming the first minister without a general election. Women who attained a leadership position in this manner have, however, had a mixed record of success or failure in their first general elections as leader; Campbell and Johnston both failed to win election, while several other women (including Callbeck) succeeded. Only three women — Pat Duncan in Yukon, Pauline Marois in Quebec, and Rachel Notley in Alberta — have become premier of a province or territory by leading their party to victory in a general election in which they were not already the incumbent premier: Duncan was elected in 2000, Marois in 2012, and Notley in 2015.

No woman premier has ever won two successive general elections, however; as of 2024, every woman premier who has won one election has either lost, or resigned the office in advance of, her second election at the helm.

Women achieved a significant breakthrough in the early 2010s, when a number of women won the leadership of the governing political parties in their respective provinces within a short time of each other. Several journalists christened 2011 as "The Year of the Woman" because of the breakthrough; by September 2012, in fact, fully half of all Canadian provinces had female premiers. By early 2014, however, two of the premiers had resigned amid controversy, which some analysts attributed in part to gender issues. According to political scientist Brenda O'Neill of the University of Calgary, "I think there still is a double standard that's applied to women versus men in terms of how they lead, the degree of support they are given and the degree to which is extended to them when they make mistakes."

Nellie Cournoyea and Caroline Cochrane in the Northwest Territories, and Eva Aariak in Nunavut, have been territorial premiers through a non-partisan consensus government system, in which they were selected by their colleagues in the legislative assembly rather than by leading a political party to victory.

As of 2024, eight of Canada's ten provinces have had a female premier, but only British Columbia and Alberta have had more than one; Nova Scotia and Saskatchewan are the only two provinces that have never been served by a female premier. All three of Canada's territories have had at least one female premier each. As of November 2024, there are two female premiers as of 2025: Danielle Smith, who was sworn in as Premier of Alberta in October 2022, and Susan Holt, who was sworn in as Premier of New Brunswick in November 2024.

Upon winning the 2013 Ontario Liberal Party leadership election, Kathleen Wynne became the first out lesbian to be a first minister in Canada.

== Personal aspects ==
Women in politics still sometimes face a double standard, with their personal lives subject to greater scrutiny than those of men in equivalent positions. In what some commentators have characterized as an example of sexism, Christy Clark was asked by several journalists to explain how she could properly do her job as provincial Minister of Education while simultaneously raising a newborn child; her then-husband, Liberal Party strategist Mark Marissen, was not asked the same question despite holding a similarly busy and high-profile public position.

When Clark announced her candidacy for the 2011 British Columbia Liberal Party leadership race, she was again asked by journalist Bill Good how she planned to balance her role as a mother with the responsibilities of serving as provincial premier if she won – to which Clark responded:

Stephen Harper manages to go home for dinner with his kids every night, or most nights when he's in the country, and he has breakfast with them in the morning, and he's a pretty busy guy. He does a pretty good job. Every family has their own circumstances and makes its own decisions. I've talked about this with my family. My son is no longer a toddler. We've had this conversation. And we can handle it.

In 1985, Pauline Marois became the first woman in Canadian history to give birth to a child while serving as a provincial cabinet minister. She was followed in 2001 by Christy Clark. In 1987, Sheila Copps became the first woman in Canadian history to give birth to a child while sitting as a federal Member of Parliament. In 1999, Michelle Dockrill became the first Member of Parliament to bring her newborn baby into the House of Commons.

Similarly, following Clark's victory in the leadership race, Global Vancouver anchor Chris Gailus was criticized for asking her in an interview whether her new job as premier would leave her any time to date. While sitting as a provincial MLA in Manitoba, Judy Wasylycia-Leis gave birth to a child in 1988, and was dismissed by another MLA as "a high-priced babysitter" when she set up a playpen in her office and took time out from a committee meeting to breastfeed.

Both Copps and Campbell wrote in their autobiographies that their romantic and family lives were excessively scrutinized by colleagues and journalists. In the 2006 book The Secret Mulroney Tapes, Brian Mulroney – Campbell's immediate predecessor as Prime Minister – asserted that Campbell's romantic relationship with Gregory Lekhtman distracted her from conducting a proper campaign in the 1993 election. He did not, however, elaborate on how Campbell's personal life constituted a greater distraction to her political career than his own family life with his wife Mila and their four children did to his. Similarly, when Belinda Stronach crossed the floor from the Conservatives to the Liberals in 2005, political reaction to her announcement took on a very different tone than similar moves by male politicians – while David Emerson, for instance, was criticized in a relatively civil manner for the ethics of his floor-crossing, Stronach was variously labelled a "dog", a "dipstick" and a "whore" by her former colleagues.

In her autobiography Time and Chance, Kim Campbell claimed that her own campaign staff sometimes treated her more as a figurehead than as the actual leader of the party, even going so far as to keep campaign offices at Brian Mulroney's preferred room temperature even if Campbell ordered them to adjust the thermostat.

=== Beauty and aesthetic critique ===
Criticism of female politicians in Canada has often occurred in terms of aesthetic assessment that has worked to connect ideas about a politician's beauty to their political and leadership abilities. Clothing, hairstyles and overall appearance have all been subject to scrutiny. For example, Conservative MP Rona Ambrose received extraordinary publicity that focused on her beauty rather than any element of her capacity to represent her constituency or work as an MP. Also, former NDP leader Alexa McDonough was sometimes judged for wearing the same dress on multiple occasions, with magazines featuring headlines such as "Alexa McDonough, Call your dry-cleaner."

Belinda Stronach's run against Stephen Harper for the leadership of the Conservative Party in 2004 was labeled "Blond Ambition"; Stronach later attracted more press for dyeing her hair brown and dating Tie Domi than for her actual accomplishments in politics or business.

== Political aspects ==
Unlike the offices of state governor or president in the United States, prime ministers and provincial premiers in Canada are not independently elected by the general electorate; instead, the position goes automatically to the leader of the largest party caucus in the legislature. This creates a significantly different campaign dynamic, which may unintentionally complicate the efforts of women to achieve higher office. For instance, while it is possible in the United States for voters to choose one party's candidate for president or governor and a different party's candidate for their congressional or state representative, Canadians vote only for their local representative, and not directly for their premier or prime minister.

In the 1990s, parties led by women often fared particularly poorly in election campaigns, sometimes even losing elections their parties had seemed poised to win. This gave rise to extensive discussion of the double standards that the public applies to women in leadership roles; some commentators have noted, for instance, that when a party led by a woman loses an election, much greater blame is placed on the leader herself — or even on the entire concept of women as leaders — than when a man leads his party to defeat. Prior to the 21st century only one woman, Catherine Callbeck in Prince Edward Island, had ever won election to a first ministership in Canada — notably, she led her party into an election where the main opposition party was also led by a woman, Patricia Mella, and thus a woman would have been elected premier of Prince Edward Island in 1993 regardless of which party won. Political analysts have debated, however, whether either woman could have won the election if the other party had been led by a man. Further, Callbeck's government proved unpopular, and she held power for just three years before she was forced to step down in favour of a new leader.

However, as the number of women leaders has increased, several other women leaders have since led their parties to election victories.

Campbell's Progressive Conservatives and McLaughlin's New Democratic Party were decimated in 1993, both failing to reach official party status, and Lyn McLeod's Ontario Liberal Party lost the 1995 provincial election despite having more than a 10 per cent lead in the polls when the election was called. McLeod was criticized for a perceived tendency toward weak leadership and flip-flopping on the issues, especially after she withdrew her party's support from the 1994 Equality Rights Statute Amendment Act – PC election ads depicted McLeod as a weathervane shifting in the wind, and the party's popular support dropped almost 20 percentage points in the space of just 40 days.

Alexa McDonough led the New Democrats to a modest resurgence in the 1997 election, but lost seats again in the 2000 vote. Several women leaders of provincial parties, including Sharon Carstairs, Lynda Haverstock and Nancy MacBeth, proved unable to capitalize on early signs of popularity, all ultimately losing significant ground for their parties.

Pat Duncan, meanwhile, won the 2000 Yukon election against parties led by men, but her government lasted just two years before it was reduced to a minority when three Liberal MLAs resigned from the caucus – and in the resulting 2002 election, her party was nearly wiped out.

Some have attributed this to the belief that the voting public widely ascribes leadership qualities more to men than to women. Sheila Copps, for example, once noted in a newspaper interview that "if you're a woman and you're aggressive, you're a ball-buster", Ruby Dhalla told an interviewer from Inter Press Service that women in politics have to be tougher, stronger and harder-working than men to reach the same level of achievement, and Charlotte Whitton, one of Canada's first prominent women mayors, once famously quipped that "Whatever women do they must do twice as well as men to be thought half as good. Luckily, this is not difficult."

Andrea Horwath, a former leader of the Ontario New Democratic Party who was elected mayor of Hamilton in 2022, has noted that she faced not just indifference, but active discouragement, from both men and women – based around the notion that at age 35, she was too young and hadn't earned the right to get into politics – when she first ran for Hamilton, Ontario City Council in 1997:

I found it was very paternalistic. From men and women, I kept hearing that I was too young and that it wasn't my turn. I was told I should wait until I was older, even though there were male councillors younger than I.

Conversely, however, MP Martha Hall Findlay has asserted that one of the biggest barriers to women's greater participation in politics is their own fear of stepping into the public spotlight:

I can't tell you the number of women who say, I don't know if I have a thick-enough skin, or I don't know if I have what it takes. And I look at them and think: Okay, you told me you have three children. You started your own business. You now employ 73 people. And you tell me you don't have a thick-enough skin and you don't think you have what it takes? Look in a mirror. Why is it that some people who are so capable and so accomplished somehow still don't think they have what it takes?"

Maureen MacDonald, a New Democratic MLA in Nova Scotia, has offered a similar assessment:

I've learned some lessons in my time in politics, and I learned women don't come to the political arena easily. Generally speaking, women have a lot of uncertainty about whether or not they have the kind of skills that will not only give them success, but staying power. It is seen as a blood sport and you have to get the elbows up and there are many women who don't want to participate in that way. (Women) never think they know enough to be a candidate. They think they have to have the answer for everything, where the male candidates are much more confident and are more prepared to wing it.

Danielle Smith has also suggested that new opportunities have been opened for women due to recent changes in Canadian political culture. According to Smith, the fact that most governments in Canada have now instituted fixed election dates helps women, who still generally hold more responsibility for the care of children and aging or ailing parents than most men do, to plan more easily toward a goal of running for political office; and the fact that most political parties have now moved to a one member one vote system, instead of the more traditional leadership convention method of selecting leaders, has helped women because the grassroots are typically more willing to vote for women leaders than the "old boys network" inside a political party's establishment are.

Conversely, commentators have also claimed that political parties in Canada have tended to turn to female leaders as an almost cynical ploy in times of crisis – in some cases, parties have been accused of relying on the "novelty" of a female leader as a tokenist substitute for creating a substantive policy platform. Campbell and Johnston, for instance, both inherited the leadership of scandal-plagued and unpopular incumbent parties which were considered unlikely to win the next election even before each woman assumed the party's leadership. Due to the timing of the leadership campaigns, further, both became leader late in the final year of the government's mandate, just weeks before a mandatory election. As a result, both were left with very little time to demonstrate that their administrations could offer any sort of fundamental change, and thus remained vulnerable to the negative perceptions that voters held of their predecessors.

Meanwhile, women such as Pam Barrett, Joy MacPhail, Lynda Haverstock, Alexa McDonough, Sharon Carstairs, Elizabeth Weir, Karen Casey, Shirley McLoughlin and Carole James became leaders of provincial parties which had already been largely wiped off the electoral map. According to political scientist Linda Trimble, this made the leadership of these parties a "flawed prize" which a male politician would be seen as weak for even wanting – and then those women who actually achieved a measure of success in reviving the parties often became vulnerable to internal leadership challenges once their work had returned the party to real contention for power, and renewed desirability as a prize for male politicians to pursue.

Carole James had the most dramatic success of any woman leader in reviving a party in crisis, taking the British Columbia NDP from its dramatic defeat in the 2001 election – when it won just two seats and didn't even qualify for official party status – to 33 seats in the 2005 election. However, some critics dismissed her as being competent enough to bring the party's traditional core vote back following an unprecedented disaster, but not possessing the leadership skills necessary to take the party any further than its own base; in the subsequent 2009 election, the party won just two additional seats. After a period of caucus infighting, she was forced to announce her resignation as party leader in December 2010; notably, her (male) successor, Adrian Dix, led the party to a slightly worse result in the 2013 election than James had in 2009.

Political scientist Sylvia Bashevkin has noted the disparity between how male and female politicians are perceived by the public. In her book Women, Power, Politics: The Hidden Story of Canada's Unfinished Democracy, she explains that female politicians are far less likely to receive media coverage than their male counterparts. Moreover, in the cases where women manage to attract coverage, the media often tends to "[focus] on personal style and private life matters, rather than on public policy views." Here, the 2004 Conservative leadership election may serve as a case-study: as Bashevkin observes, the media mentioned Belinda Stronach's marital status "four times as often as they did that of fellow contender Stephen Harper."

Furthermore, many desirable leadership qualities are commonly associated with masculinity. As a result, a female politician who displays these qualities may be seen as off-putting and unfeminine. Kim Campbell, for instance, has commented on the uneasy relationship between leadership and gender: "I was called arrogant, aggressive and lacking compassion," she stated in 1997, "I don't have a typically female pattern of speech. I'm open and assertive. In men, those traits are perceived as leadership material. In a woman, they are denigrated". Similarly, Sheila Copps and Sharon Carstairs have been accused of harshness and stridence, with Copps receiving the epithets of "baby", "slut" and "bitch" in Parliamentary discourse.

== Encouraging women's participation ==
Because male and female politicians are judged according to disparate standards, Bashevkin has suggested that many women may be discouraged from entering politics in the first place. She writes, "Efforts to recruit more female candidates often fall short once the individuals being wooed start to think about what happened to the few courageous pioneers who preceded them." This might explain the general decrease of female representation in Canadian government in recent years—for instance, a major federal party has not had a female leader since Alexa McDonough resigned her post as head of the NDP in 2003.

Political parties at both the federal and provincial levels have often faced difficulty in boosting the number of women prepared to stand as election candidates. This may be in part because women may be reluctant to run for parliament because of the adversarial and combative nature of work.

Political parties which take a strictly hands-off approach typically find themselves unable to put forward a slate of candidates that is more than 20 to 25 per cent female – but parties which implement more active strategies often risk being criticized as "anti-democratic" if their programs too closely resemble affirmative action. For example, the British Columbia New Democratic Party has used a strategy in which a riding association whose incumbent MLA retires must nominate a woman in the resulting by-election or general election, in order to ensure that the party is placing women in "winnable" seats – however, this strategy faced criticism from some potential candidates who felt that the policy constituted reverse discrimination against them as men.

Conversely, the federal New Democratic Party requires its riding associations to make at least a good faith attempt to ensure that women or minority candidates are on the ballot whenever a nomination contest is held, but does not set a quota per se.

At various times, both federal and provincial parties have also been accused of tokenism, slotting a disproportionate number of women candidates in ridings their party has little chance of winning while doing little or nothing about the fact that the more competitive candidate selection process in "winnable" seats still tends to favor men.

In addition to the underrepresentation of women in politics overall, younger women are typically even more underrepresented. While younger men are quite regularly elected to political office at all levels of government, women under the age of 40 holding office at the provincial or federal levels are especially rare. This dichotomy has been attributed to a variety of factors, including women being reluctant to take on the responsibilities of a career in politics until their children are older, as well as the belief that younger women are especially likely to face sexist assumptions that their political and professional abilities are unequal to those of men in the same age bracket.

The non-partisan organization Equal Voice, whose board consists of several prominent female politicians, works to assist women in running for public office through education, advocacy and professional networking. When former federal MP Belinda Stronach was given an award by Equal Voice for her role in advancing women's participation in politics, in her speech she identified some of what she saw as the barriers, including a lack of civility in the House of Commons, an excessive focus on women parliamentarians' appearance rather than their ideas and skills, and the need to take advantage of modern communications technologies, such as videoconferencing and Internet voting, so that both men and women in politics have greater flexibility to balance their job duties with their family lives.

Prior to the 2015 Northwest Territories general election, the territorial Status of Women Council ran an educational seminar on women in politics, which was attended by all ten women who ran as candidates in the election campaign. Given the consensus government structure of the legislature, one of the strategies that the women pursued was to not run against each other, in an attempt to avoid splitting the vote; of the 19 legislative districts in the territory, only one had more than one woman candidate on the ballot.

In 2015, MP Christine Moore gave birth to her first child during the federal election campaign. In her first statement to the 42nd Canadian Parliament, she spoke of the need for parliamentarians to make the political environment more family friendly, stating that "I hope we can make the world a place where women and new parents do not have to choose between their careers and their families...It is important for society to make it easier, not harder, to achieve work-life balance."

== Municipal politics ==
Hannah Gale was elected to Calgary City Council in 1917, becoming the first woman ever elected to any municipal office in Canada. However, women had previously served as school trustees. Women city councillors were so scarce in the 1930s that Margaret Crang of Edmonton was described as "the" woman alderman across the Prairies.

In 1920, Violet Barss became the first woman ever appointed as a reeve in Canada, in the village of Delia, Alberta. (Reeve is a position similar to mayor, with the difference that Barss was selected and appointed internally by her colleagues on the village council, not directly elected to the position by the voters.) In 1936, Barbara Hanley in Webbwood, Ontario became the first woman ever elected as mayor in a general election; in 1938, Mary Theresa King-Myers from Halifax, Nova Scotia became the first woman to be elected as a municipal councillor in rural Canada. In 1951, Charlotte Whitton in Ottawa became the first woman elected mayor of a major Canadian city.

Other prominent women mayors in Canada have included:

Provinces & Territories	Riding	Mayors
Alberta	Calgary	Jyoti Gondek
Alberta	Edmonton	Jan Reimer
Alberta	Red Deer	Tara Veer
British Columbia
British Columbia	Chilliwack	Sharon Gaetz
British Columbia	Victoria	Gretchen Brewin
British Columbia	Victoria	Lisa Helps
British Columbia	Victoria	Marianne Alto
Manitoba	Winnipeg	Susan Thompson
New Brunswick	Fredericton	Kate Rogers
New Brunswick	Moncton	Dawn Arnold
New Brunswick	Saint John	Elsie Wayne
New Brunswick	Saint John	Donna Reardon
Newfoundland And Labrador	St. John's	Dorothy Wyatt
Newfoundland And Labrador	St. John's	Shannie Duff
Nova Scotia	Halifax	Moira Leiper Ducharme
Nunavut	Iqaluit	Elisapee Sheutiapik
Nunavut	Iqaluit	Madeleine Redfern
Ontario
Ontario	Barrie	Janice Laking
Ontario	Brampton	Susan Fennell
Ontario	Brampton	Linda Jeffrey
Ontario	Burlington	Marianne Meed Ward
Ontario	Hamilton	Andrea Horwath
Ontario	Kingston	Helen Cooper
Ontario	London	Dianne Haskett
Ontario	London	Anne Marie DeCicco-Best
Ontario	Mississauga	Hazel McCallion
Ontario	Mississauga	Bonnie Crombie
Ontario	Mississauga	Carolyn Parrish
Ontario	Ottawa	Marion Dewar
Ontario	Ottawa	Jacquelin Holzman
Ontario	Peterborough	Diane Therrien
Ontario	Sault Ste. Marie	Debbie Amaroso
Ontario	Sudbury	Grace Hartman
Ontario	Sudbury	Marianne Matichuk
Ontario	Thunder Bay	Dusty Miller
Ontario	Thunder Bay	Lynn Peterson
Ontario	Toronto	June Rowlands
Ontario	Toronto	Barbara Hall
Ontario	Toronto	Olivia Chow
Ontario	Toronto (East York)	True Davidson
Ontario	Toronto (York)	Gayle Christie
Ontario	Toronto (York)	Frances Nunziata
Ontario	Vaughan	Lorna Jackson
Ontario	Vaughan	Linda Jackson
Ontario	Windsor	Elizabeth Kishkon
Prince Edward Island	Charlottetown	Dorothy Corrigan
Quebec	Lac-Mégantic	Colette Roy-Laroche
Quebec	Longueuil	Catherine Fournier
Quebec	Montreal	Valérie Plante
Quebec	Quebec City	Andrée Boucher
Quebec	Saguenay	Josée Néron
Saskatchewan	Moose Jaw	Deb Higgins
Saskatchewan	Regina	Sandra Masters
Yukon	Dawson City	Yolanda Burkhard
Yukon	Whitehorse	Ione Christensen
Yukon	Whitehorse	Kathy Watson
Yukon	Whitehorse	Bev Buckway

In 1984, Daurene Lewis was elected mayor of Annapolis Royal, Nova Scotia, becoming the first black woman to be elected as a mayor in North America.

A study released by the Federation of Canadian Municipalities in early 2009 found that women outnumbered men as municipal chief administrative officers or city managers – a position which is hired, not elected – in Canada. However, they still lagged significantly behind men as elected municipal councilors and mayors, representing just 23 per cent of all elected municipal officials. Only in Canada's three territories, Nunavut, Yukon and the Northwest Territories, did women represent more than one-third of elected municipal officials at the time of the study, and the Yukon was the only province or territory in all of Canada where more than one-third of all mayors were women.

One barrier to women's participation in municipal politics that has been commonly identified is that while a few of Canada's largest cities pay their councilors enough that city council can be a person's sole full-time job, most smaller cities pay their councilors only a modest salary that may not even significantly exceed minimum wage, regardless of how many hours they work — making the council effectively a full-time job for only part-time pay, and thus largely restricting the role to people who have the time and resources to balance their council work with another source of income.

Among younger women, the fact that family tasks such as child care are still not always divided equitably between fathers and mothers has been identified as an issue; a woman with young children will often have more difficulty finding the time to add a political career to her schedule than her husband does, and may in fact end up being even worse off financially as a councilor's salary may not actually be enough to cover the cost of paid childcare. Even older women are not immune to this issue, however; in 2010, Greater Sudbury city councilor Evelyn Dutrisac told the Sudbury Star that she was only able to serve on city council because as a retired teacher she was able to support herself on her Ontario Teachers' Pension Plan income.

The FCM has set the goal of increasing the number of women in municipal government to at least 30 per cent by 2026, and has identified a number of strategies to do so, including mentoring programs, active recruitment of women to serve on municipal boards and committees, and implementing work-life balance programs, such as day care services, to facilitate the participation of women with young children.

As of 2025, among major Canadian cities, women represent five out of seven councillors on the Waterloo City Council in Waterloo, Ontario, with a woman mayor. Toronto City Council also surpassed the Federation of Canadian Municipalities' 30 per cent target in the 2010 election, with 15 women councillors representing exactly one-third of the full council. Women have also represented around a third of elected members of Montreal City Council in recent years, but have approached or exceeded 50 per cent of candidates elected to the lower-level borough (arrondissement) councils.

In the 2014 municipal election in Esquimalt, British Columbia, women were elected to six of the seven seats (including the mayoralty). This council also included two women under the age of 40 at the time of their election.

== Viceroyalty ==
Canada is a constitutional monarchy whose head of state, King Charles III as of 2025, is represented in Canada by the governor general and in the provinces by the lieutenant governors, who perform the ceremonial functions of the head of state in the Westminster system. The heads of state of the territories are commissioners representing the federal government, not the king. All are ceremonial roles with negligible real political power. The governor general and lieutenant governors are appointed by the monarch on the advice of the prime minister.

Canada has had two female monarchs since Confederation: Queen Victoria and Queen Elizabeth II.

Jeanne Sauvé was the first female governor general of Canada, appointed in 1984. Five other women have since been governor general: Adrienne Clarkson, Michaëlle Jean, Julie Payette, Mary Simon, and Louise Arbour.

The first female lieutenant governor was Pauline McGibbon, appointed Lieutenant Governor of Ontario in 1974. Since then, all ten provinces have had female lieutenant governors, and all three territories have had female commissioners. The first female territorial commissioner was Ione Christensen, who became Commissioner of Yukon in 1979. Helen Maksagak was both the first female Commissioner of the Northwest Territories (in 1995) and of Nunavut (in 1999).

== Timeline of notable events ==
=== National ===
- 1895 - Maria Grant is the first woman in Canada to be elected to any office. She served six years on the Victoria School Board and was presented to the future George V as the only woman elected as a school trustee in Canada.
- 1902 – Margaret Haile runs as a candidate of the Canadian Socialist League in Toronto North for the Ontario provincial election, becoming the first woman ever to stand in a provincial election.
- 1917 – Louise McKinney and Roberta MacAdams are elected to the Legislative Assembly of Alberta.
- 1921 – Agnes Macphail becomes the first woman elected to the House of Commons of Canada. Mary Ellen Smith in BC becomes the first woman cabinet minister
- 1930 – Cairine Wilson becomes the first woman appointed to the Senate of Canada.
- 1936 – Barbara Hanley becomes Canada's first woman mayor.
- 1950 - Nancy Hodges of BC becomes the first woman in the Commonwealth elected speaker of a legislature
- 1951 – Charlotte Whitton becomes Canada's first woman mayor of a major city. Thérèse Casgrain, the first woman to lead a provincial political party in Canada, becomes leader of the Quebec CCF.
- 1958 – Ellen Fairclough becomes Canada's first federal female cabinet minister, and also serves as Acting Prime Minister for two days during John Diefenbaker's absence from the country.
- 1967 – Mary Walker-Sawka becomes the first woman to be nominated as a candidate for the leadership of a federal political party.
- 1972 – Muriel McQueen Fergusson becomes the first female Speaker of the Senate of Canada.
- 1974 – Pauline McGibbon becomes Canada's first female Lieutenant Governor of a province.
- 1974 - Dorothea Crittenden becomes Canada's first female Deputy Minister, Ministry of Community & Social Services, Province of Ontario
- 1978 – Hilda Watson leads the Yukon Progressive Conservative Party into the 1978 Yukon election, the territory's first-ever partisan legislative election. Although the party wins the election, Watson fails to win her own seat and thus does not become government leader.
- 1979 – Flora MacDonald becomes Canada's first female Secretary of State for External Affairs.
- 1980 – Jeanne Sauvé becomes the first female Speaker of the House of Commons. Alexa McDonough becomes leader of the Nova Scotia New Democratic Party, making her the first woman to lead a political party in a Canadian legislature.
- 1982 – Bertha Wilson becomes the first female Puisne justice of the Supreme Court of Canada.
- 1984 – Jeanne Sauvé becomes Canada's first female Governor General.
- 1988 – Kathryn Cholette (Green) becomes the first woman ever to lead a federal political party in Canada.
- 1989 – Audrey McLaughlin (NDP) becomes the first woman to lead a political party with representation in the House of Commons.
- 1991 – Rita Johnston wins the leadership of the British Columbia Social Credit Party, becoming Canada's first female premier. She is followed later the same year by Nellie Cournoyea in the Northwest Territories.
- 1993 – Kim Campbell becomes Canada's first female Prime Minister. Joyce Fairbairn becomes Canada's first female Leader of the Government in the Senate. Catherine Callbeck becomes Premier of Prince Edward Island in January by winning the leadership of the governing party; she calls the 1993 Prince Edward Island general election soon afterward, becoming the first woman in Canada to win a premiership in a general election. Sheila Copps becomes Canada's first female Deputy Prime Minister.
- 1994 – Delia Opekokew becomes the first woman to run for the leadership of the Assembly of First Nations.
- 2000 – Beverley McLachlin becomes Canada's first female Chief Justice of the Supreme Court. Deborah Grey becomes Canada's first female Leader of the Opposition in the House of Commons.
- 2007 – Céline Hervieux-Payette becomes the first woman to serve as Leader of the Opposition in the Senate.
- 2020 – Chrystia Freeland becomes Canada's first female Minister of Finance.
- 2021 – RoseAnne Archibald becomes the first female national chief of the Assembly of First Nations. She was national chief from July 2021 to June 2023.
- 2023 – With the appointment of Mary Moreau, the Supreme Court of Canada gains its first female majority.

=== Provincial/regional ===
==== Ontario ====
- Candidate for any electoral office – Margaret Haile – 1902 (1902 provincial election)
- Federal Member of Parliament – Agnes Macphail – 1921
- Member of Provincial Parliament – Agnes Macphail and Rae Luckock – 1943
- Band councilor for a First Nation – Marion Anderson (Big Trout Lake), 1950
- Lieutenant Governor of Ontario – Pauline McGibbon – 1974
- Deputy Premier – Bette Stephenson – 1985
- Leader of a political party – Elizabeth Rowley – 1990
- Mayor of Toronto – June Rowlands – 1991–1994
- Leader of a political party with representation in the legislature – Lyn McLeod – 1992
- Leader of the Opposition – Lyn McLeod – 1992
- Trans woman candidate – Christin Milloy – 2011
- Premier of Ontario - Kathleen Wynne - 2013

==== Manitoba ====
- Member of the Legislative Assembly – Edith Rogers – 1920
- Senator - Olive Irvine - 1960
- Federal Member of Parliament – Margaret Konantz (Rogers' daughter) – 1963
- Lieutenant Governor of Manitoba – Pearl McGonigal – 1981
- Leader of a political party – Sharon Carstairs – 1984
- Leader of the Opposition – Sharon Carstairs – 1988
- Mayor of Winnipeg – Susan Thompson – 1992–1998
- Premier of Manitoba - Heather Stefanson – 2021

==== Saskatchewan ====
- Member of the Legislative Assembly – Sarah Ramsland – 1919
- Federal Member of Parliament – Dorise Nielsen – 1940
- Lieutenant Governor of Saskatchewan – Sylvia Fedoruk – 1988
- Leader of a political party – Lynda Haverstock – 1989
- Leader of the Opposition – Lynda Haverstock – 1995
- Senator - Raynell Andreychuk - 1993
- Leader of the Opposition - Nicole Sarauer - 2017-2018
- Leader of a political party - Nicole Sarauer - 2017-2018

==== New Brunswick ====
- Senator - Muriel Fergusson - 1953
- Federal Member of Parliament – Margaret Rideout – 1964
- Member of the Legislative Assembly – Brenda Robertson – 1967
- Cabinet minister – Brenda Robertson – 1970
- Interim leader of a political party in the legislature – Shirley Dysart - 1985
- Interim Leader of the Opposition in the legislature – Shirley Dysart - 1985
- Leader of a political party – Elizabeth Weir and Barbara Baird – both 1989
- Speaker of the Legislative Assembly - Shirley Dysart - 1991
- Lieutenant Governor of New Brunswick – Margaret McCain – 1994
- Premier of New Brunswick - Susan Holt - 2024

==== Quebec ====
- Leader of a political party – Thérèse Casgrain – 1951
- Senator - Mariana Beauchamp Jodoin - 1953
- Member of the National Assembly – Marie-Claire Kirkland – 1961
- Federal Member of Parliament – Monique Bégin, Albanie Morin and Jeanne Sauvé – 1972
- Lieutenant Governor of Quebec – Lise Thibault – 1997
- Leader of the Opposition – Monique Gagnon-Tremblay – 1998
- Speaker of the National Assembly – Louise Harel – 2002
- Mayor of Quebec City – Andrée Boucher – 2005
- Leader of a political party with representation in the legislature – Pauline Marois – 2007
- Premier of Quebec - Pauline Marois - 2012
- Mayor of Montreal - Valérie Plante - 2017

==== Alberta ====
- Member of the Legislative Assembly – Louise McKinney and Roberta MacAdams – 1917
- Federal Member of Parliament – Cora Taylor Casselman – 1941
- Senator - Martha Bielish - 1979
- Mayor of Edmonton – Jan Reimer – 1989
- Interim Leader of a political party - Bettie Hewes - 1994
- Interim Leader of the Official Opposition in the Legislative Assembly – Bettie Hewes – 1994
- Leader of a political party - Pam Barrett - 1996
- Leader of the Official Opposition in the Legislative Assembly – Nancy MacBeth – 1998
- Lieutenant Governor of Alberta – Lois Hole – 2000
- Premier of Alberta – Alison Redford – 2011
- Premier reelected – Alison Redford – 2012
- Premier of Alberta – Rachel Notley – 2015
- Mayor of Calgary -- Jyoti Gondek - 2021
- Premier of Alberta – Danielle Smith – 2023

==== Nova Scotia ====
- Municipal councillor – Mary Theresa King-Myers – 1938
- Member of the Legislative Assembly – Gladys Porter – 1960
- Senator - Margaret Norrie - 1972
- Federal Member of Parliament – Coline Campbell – 1974
- Leader of a political party – Alexa McDonough – 1980
- Cabinet Minister – Maxine Cochran – 1985
- Lieutenant Governor of Nova Scotia – Myra Freeman – 2000
- Interim Leader of the Opposition – Karla MacFarlane – 2018

==== British Columbia ====
- School trustee - Maria Grant - 1895
- Member of the Legislative Assembly – Mary Ellen Smith – 1918
- Cabinet minister – Mary Ellen Smith – 1921
- Acting speaker of the Legislative Assembly – Mary Ellen Smith – 1928
- Female mayor – Stella Gummow, Peachland – 1944
- Speaker of the Legislative Assembly - Nancy Hodges - 1950 - first woman elected speaker in the Commonwealth
- Senator - Nancy Hodges - 1953
- Federal Member of Parliament - Pauline Jewett - 1963
- Leader of a political party – Shirley McLoughlin, British Columbia Liberal Party – 1981
- Premier – Rita Johnston – 1991
- Leader of the Opposition – Joy MacPhail – 2001
- Lieutenant Governor of British Columbia – Iona Campagnolo – 2001
- Premier reelected – Christy Clark – 2013

==== Prince Edward Island ====
- Candidate for the Legislative Assembly – Hilda Ramsay – 1951
- Senator - Florence Inman - 1955
- Federal Member of Parliament – Margaret Mary Macdonald – 1961
- Member of the Legislative Assembly – Jean Canfield – 1970
- Cabinet minister – Jean Canfield – 1972
- Interim leader of a political party – Doreen Sark – 1979
- Leader of the Opposition - Leone Bagnall - 1986
- Lieutenant Governor – Marion Reid – 1990
- Leader of a political party – Pat Mella – 1990
- Premier – Catherine Callbeck – 1993
- Premier reelected – Catherine Callbeck – 1993

==== Newfoundland and Labrador ====
- Member of the House of Assembly (pre-Confederation) – Helena Squires – 1930
- Member of the House of Assembly (post-Confederation) – Hazel McIsaac – 1975
- Cabinet ministers – Lynn Verge and Hazel Newhook – 1979
- Senator - Ethel Cochrane - 1986
- Federal Member of Parliament – Jean Payne and Bonnie Hickey – 1993
- Leader of a political party – Lynn Verge – 1995
- Leader of the Official Opposition – Lynn Verge – 1995
- Premier – Kathy Dunderdale – 2010
- Leaders of all political parties represented in the Legislature – Kathy Dunderdale, Yvonne Jones, Lorraine Michael – 2010
- Premier reelected – Kathy Dunderdale – 2011
- Lieutenant Governor of Newfoundland and Labrador – Judy Foote – 2018

==== Yukon ====
- Federal Member of Parliament – Martha Black – 1935
- Member of the Legislative Assembly – G. Jean Gordon – 1967
- Leader of a political party – Hilda Watson – 1978
- Commissioner – Ione Christensen – 1979
- Leader of the Opposition – Pat Duncan – 1999
- Senator - Ione Christensen - 1999
- Premier – Pat Duncan – 2000

==== Northwest Territories ====
- Member of the Legislative Assembly – Lena Pedersen (Pederson) – 1970
- Federal Member of Parliament – Ethel Blondin-Andrew – 1988
- Premier – Nellie Cournoyea – 1991
- Commissioner – Helen Maksagak – 1995

==== Nunavut ====
- Federal Member of Parliament – Nancy Karetak-Lindell – 1999
- Member of the Legislative Assembly – Manitok Thompson – 1999
- Commissioner – Helen Maksagak – 1999
- Premier – Eva Aariak – 2008

== See also ==
- Women in government
