= Women in the 22nd Canadian Parliament =

The number of women sitting in the House of Commons increased to a new maximum during the 22nd Canadian Parliament; the number of women senators also increased. 47 women ran for seats in the Canadian House of Commons in the 1953 federal election; four were elected.

Two more women were named to the Canadian senate: Nancy Hodges in November 1953 and Florence Elsie Inman in July 1955, bringing the total number of women senators to six. Senator Iva Campbell Fallis died in March 1956.

== Party Standings ==
Party	Total women candidates	% women candidates of total candidates	Total women elected	% women elected of total women candidates	% women elected of total elected
Labor-Progressive	22 (of 100)	22%	0 (of 0)	0%	-
Progressive Conservative	10 (of 248)	4.0%	3 (of 51)	30%	5.9%
Co-operative Commonwealth Federation	10 (of 170)	5.9%	0 (of 23)	0%	0%
Liberal	3 (of 262)	1.1%	1 (of 169)	33.3%	0.6%
Independent Liberal	1 (of 19)	5.3%	0 (of 2)	0%	0%
Social Credit	1 (of 71)	1.4%	0 (of 15)	0%	0%
Table source:

== Members of the House of Commons ==
Name	Party	Electoral district	Notes
Margaret Aitken	Progressive Conservative	York—Humber
Sybil Bennett	Progressive Conservative	Halton
Ellen Fairclough	Progressive Conservative	Hamilton West
Ann Shipley	Liberal	Timiskaming

== Senators ==
Senator	Appointed on the advice of	Term	from	Party
Cairine Wilson	King	1930.02.15 - 1962.03.03	Ontario	Liberal
Iva Campbell Fallis	Bennett	1935.07.20 - 1956.03.07	Ontario	Conservative
Muriel McQueen Fergusson	St. Laurent	1953.05.19 - 1975.05.23	New Brunswick	Liberal
Mariana Beauchamp Jodoin	St. Laurent	1953.05.19 - 1966.06.01	Quebec	Liberal
Nancy Hodges	St. Laurent	1953.11.05 - 1965.06.12	British Columbia	Liberal
Florence Elsie Inman	St. Laurent	1955.07.28 - 1986.05.31	Prince Edward Island	Liberal
