= Women in the 21st Canadian Parliament =

During the 21st Canadian Parliament, the number of sitting women senators increased. Eleven women ran for seats in the Canadian House of Commons in the 1949 federal election; none were elected. However, Ellen Fairclough, who had run unsuccessfully in the Hamilton West riding as a Progressive Conservative, was elected in a May 1950 by-election held after the incumbent was appointed to the Ontario Supreme Court.

Cairine Wilson and Iva Campbell Fallis continued to sit as members of the Senate. In May 1953, Muriel McQueen Fergusson and Mariana Beauchamp Jodoin were named to the Canadian senate, bringing the total number of women senators to four.

== Party Standings ==
Party	Total women candidates	% women candidates of total candidates	Total women elected	% women elected of total women candidates	% women elected of total elected
Co-operative Commonwealth Federation	5 (of 180)	2.8%	0 (of 13)	0%	0%
Progressive Conservative	3 (of 249)	1.2%	0 (of 41)	0%	0%
Union of Electors	2 (of 56)	3.6%	0 (of 0)	0%	-
Liberal	1 (of 258)	0.4%	0 (of 191)	0%	0%
Table source:

== Members of the House of Commons ==
Name	Party	Electoral district	Notes
Ellen Fairclough	Progressive Conservative	Hamilton West	by-election

== Senators ==
Senator	Appointed on the advice of	Term	from	Party
Cairine Wilson	King	1930.02.15 - 1962.03.03	Ontario	Liberal
Iva Campbell Fallis	Bennett	1935.07.20 - 1956.03.07	Ontario	Conservative
Muriel McQueen Fergusson	St. Laurent	1953.05.19 - 1975.05.23	New Brunswick	Liberal
Mariana Beauchamp Jodoin	St. Laurent	1953.05.19 - 1966.06.01	Quebec	Liberal
