= Women in the 23rd Canadian Parliament =

The number of women sitting in the House of Commons decreased to two during the 23rd Canadian Parliament; the number of women senators remained at five. 29 women ran for seats in the Canadian House of Commons in the 1957 federal election.

In 1957, Ellen Fairclough became the first woman to serve as a member of the Canadian cabinet.

== Party Standings ==
| Party | Total women candidates | % women candidates of total candidates | Total women elected | % women elected of total women candidates | % women elected of total elected |
|---|---|---|---|---|---|
| Co-operative Commonwealth Federation | 13 (of 162) | 8.0% | 0 (of 25) | 0% | 0% |
| Progressive Conservative | 5 (of 256) | 2.0% | 2 (of 112) | 40% | 1.8% |
| Social Credit | 1 (of 114) | 0.9% | 0 (of 19) | 0% | 0% |
| Liberal | 4 (of 254) | 1.6% | 0 (of 105) | 0% | 0% |
| Labor-Progressive | 1 (of 10) | 10% | 0 (of 0) | 0% | - |
| Independent Liberal | 1 (of 27) | 3.7% | 0 (of 1) | 0% | 0% |
Table source:

== Members of the House of Commons ==
| Name | Party | Electoral district | Notes |
|---|---|---|---|
| Margaret Aitken | Progressive Conservative | York—Humber |
| Ellen Fairclough | Progressive Conservative | Hamilton West | named to cabinet |

== Senators ==
| Senator | Appointed on the advice of | Term | from | Party |
|---|---|---|---|---|
| Cairine Wilson | King | 1930.02.15 - 1962.03.03 | Ontario | Liberal |
| Muriel McQueen Fergusson | St. Laurent | 1953.05.19 - 1975.05.23 | New Brunswick | Liberal |
| Mariana Beauchamp Jodoin | St. Laurent | 1953.05.19 - 1966.06.01 | Quebec | Liberal |
| Nancy Hodges | St. Laurent | 1953.11.05 - 1965.06.12 | British Columbia | Liberal |
| Florence Elsie Inman | St. Laurent | 1955.07.28 - 1986.05.31 | Prince Edward Island | Liberal |
