= Women in the 19th Canadian Parliament =

During the 19th Canadian Parliament, for the first time, a woman sat as a member of the party holding the majority in the House of Commons. Nine women ran for seats in the Canadian House of Commons in the 1940 federal election. Dorise Nielsen was elected in the North Battleford riding as a Unity member; she was the third woman and the first Communist to sit in the House of Commons. Agnes Macphail, first elected in 1921, was defeated. Martha Black chose to step aside to allow her husband George Black to run for reelection. Cairine Wilson and Iva Campbell Fallis continued to sit as members of the Senate.

In June 1941, Cora Taylor Casselman was elected to the House of Commons as a member of the governing Liberal Party in a by-election held following the death of her husband.

== Party Standings ==
Party	Total women candidates	% women candidates of total candidates	Total women elected	% women elected of total women candidates	% women elected of total elected
Co-operative Commonwealth Federation	5 (of 93)	5.4%	0 (of 8)	0%	0%
Unity	1 (of 2)	50%	1 (of 1)	100%	100%
Independent	1 (of 19)	5.3%	0 (of 1)	0%	0%
United Farmers of Ontario-Labour	1 (of 1)	100%	0 (of 1)	0%	-
New Democracy	1 (of 17)	5.9%	0 (of 3)	0%	0%
Table source:

== Members of the House of Commons ==
Name	Party	Electoral district	Notes
Dorise Nielsen	Unity	North Battleford	first woman MP from Saskatchewan
Cora Taylor Casselman	Liberal	Edmonton East	by-election, first woman MP from Alberta

== Senators ==
Senator	Appointed on the advice of	Term	from	Party
Cairine Wilson	King	1930.02.15 - 1962.03.03	Ontario	Liberal
Iva Campbell Fallis	Bennett	1935.07.20 - 1956.03.07	Ontario	Conservative
