= Women in the 20th Canadian Parliament =

During the 20th Canadian Parliament, women continued to sit as members of both the House of Commons and the Senate. Nineteen women ran for seats in the Canadian House of Commons in the 1945 federal election. Gladys Strum was elected in the Qu'Appelle riding as a Co-operative Commonwealth Federation member; she was the fourth woman to sit in the House of Commons and the first woman to serve as president of a Canadian political party. Cairine Wilson and Iva Campbell Fallis continued to sit as members of the Senate.

== Party Standings ==
Party	Total women candidates	% women candidates of total candidates	Total women elected	% women elected of total women candidates	% women elected of total elected
Labor-Progressive	8 of 68	11.8%	0 of 1	0%	0%
Co-operative Commonwealth Federation	6 (of 205)	2.9%	1 (of 28)	16.7%	3.6%
Social Credit	2 (of 93)	2.2%	0 (of 13)	0%	0%
Progressive Conservative	2 (of 203)	1.0%	0 (of 66)	0%	0%
Liberal	1 (of 236)	0.8%	0 (of 118)	0%	0%
Table source:

== Members of the House of Commons ==
Name	Party	Electoral district	Notes
Gladys Strum	Co-operative Commonwealth Federation	Qu'Appelle

== Senators ==
Senator	Appointed on the advice of	Term	from	Party
Cairine Wilson	King	1930.02.15 - 1962.03.03	Ontario	Liberal
Iva Campbell Fallis	Bennett	1935.07.20 - 1956.03.07	Ontario	Conservative
