= Women in the 17th Canadian Parliament =

During the 17th Canadian Parliament, the number of sitting women senators increased. Ten women ran for seats in the Canadian House of Commons in the 1930 federal election but Agnes Macphail, first elected in 1921, continued to be the only woman elected. Cairine Wilson continued to sit as a member of the Senate.

In July 1935, Iva Campbell Fallis became the second woman named to the Canadian senate.

== Party Standings ==
Party	Total women candidates	% women candidates of total candidates	Total women elected	% women elected of total women candidates	% women elected of total elected
Liberal	3 (of 226)	1.3%	0 (of 89)	0%	0%
Independent	2 (of 11)	18.1%	0 (of 2)	0%	0%
Farmer	2 (of 5)	40%	0 (of 0)	0%	-
Progressive	1 (of 15)	6.7%	1 (of 3)	100%	33.3%
Labour	1 (of 8)	12.5%	0 (of 2)	0%	0%
Independent Conservative	1 (of 6)	16.7%	0 (of 0)	0%	-
Table source:

== Members of the House of Commons ==
Name	Party	Electoral district	Notes
Agnes Macphail	Progressive	Grey Southeast

== Senators ==
Senator	Appointed on the advice of	Term	from	Party
Cairine Wilson	King	1930.02.15 - 1962.03.03	Ontario	Liberal
Iva Campbell Fallis	Bennett	1935.07.20 - 1956.03.07	Ontario	Conservative
