= Women in the 18th Canadian Parliament =

During the 18th Canadian Parliament, two women sat in the House of Commons for the first time. Sixteen women ran for seats in the Canadian House of Commons in the 1935 federal election. Agnes Macphail, first elected in 1921, was reelected in the newly created riding of Grey—Bruce. Martha Black, running in the place of her sick husband George Black as an independent Conservative, was elected for the Yukon riding, becoming the second woman to be elected to the House of Commons. Cairine Wilson and Iva Campbell Fallis continued to sit as members of the Senate.

== Party Standings ==
Party	Total women candidates	% women candidates of total candidates	Total women elected	% women elected of total women candidates	% women elected of total elected
Co-operative Commonwealth Federation	7 (of 121)	5.8%	0 (of 7)	0%	0%
Reconstruction Party	5 (of 172)	2.9%	0 (of 1)	0%	0%
Independent Conservative	1 (of 4)	25%	1 (of 1)	100%	100%
United Farmers of Ontario-Labour	1 (of 1)	100%	1 (of 1)	100%	100%
Independent	1 (of 13)	7.7%	0 (of 1)	0%	0%
Liberal	1 (of 245)	0.4%	0 (of 171)	0%	0%
Table source:

== Members of the House of Commons ==
Name	Party	Electoral district	Notes
Agnes Macphail	United Farmers of Ontario-Labour	Grey—Bruce
Martha Black	Independent Conservative	Yukon	first woman MP from Yukon

== Senators ==
Senator	Appointed on the advice of	Term	from	Party
Cairine Wilson	King	1930.02.15 - 1962.03.03	Ontario	Liberal
Iva Campbell Fallis	Bennett	1935.07.20 - 1956.03.07	Ontario	Conservative
