= Women in the 16th Canadian Parliament =

During the 16th Canadian Parliament, women sat as members for the first time in both the House of Commons and the Senate. Two women ran for seats in the Canadian House of Commons in the 1926 federal election but Agnes Macphail, first elected in 1921, continued to be the only woman elected.

In February 1930, Cairine Wilson was named to the Canadian senate, becoming the first woman named to that body.

== Party Standings ==
Party	Total women candidates	% women candidates of total candidates	Total women elected	% women elected of total women candidates	% women elected of total elected
Liberal	1 (of 203)	0.5%	0 (of 116)	0%	0%
Progressive	1 (of 28)	3.6%	1 (of 11)	100%	9.1%
Table source:

== Members of the House of Commons ==
Name	Party	Electoral district	Notes
Agnes Macphail	Progressive	Grey Southeast

== Senators ==
Senator	Appointed on the advice of	Term	from	Party
Cairine Wilson	King	1930.02.15 - 1962.03.03	Ontario	Liberal
