= Grenville South =

Former federal electoral district in Ontario, Canada

Grenville South was a federal electoral district represented in the House of Commons of Canada from 1867 to 1904. It was located in the province of Ontario. It was created by the British North America Act 1867.

The electoral district was abolished in 1903 when it was merged into Grenville riding.

== Election results ==
1867 Canadian federal election
Party	Candidate	Votes
Conservative	Walter Shanly	899
Unknown	William Patrick	730

Result by municipality

Municipality	Shanly	Patrick	Total vote	Eligible voters
Augusta Township	389	306	695	818
Edwardsburgh Township	338	283	621	720
Prescott East Ward	64	51	115	149
Prescott West Ward	61	46	107	159
Prescott South Ward	47	44	91	128
Total	899	720	1,629	1,974

1872 Canadian federal election
Party	Candidate	Votes
Liberal	William Henry Brouse	951
Conservative	Walter Shanly	866

1874 Canadian federal election
Party	Candidate	Votes
Liberal	William Henry Brouse	1,106
Conservative	Walter Shanly	995

1878 Canadian federal election
Party	Candidate	Votes
Liberal	John Philip Wiser	1,152
Unknown	J. Dumbrille	1,127

1882 Canadian federal election
Party	Candidate	Votes
Conservative	William Thomas Benson	1,187
Unknown	James Millar	1,039

On Mr. Benson's death, 8 June 1885:

By-election on 4 July 1885
Party	Candidate	Votes
Conservative	Walter Shanly	acclaimed

1887 Canadian federal election
Party	Candidate	Votes
Conservative	Walter Shanly	1,407
Liberal	William McDougall	1,187

1891 Canadian federal election
Party	Candidate	Votes
Conservative	John Dowsley Reid	1,414
Liberal	John Carruthers	1,303

1896 Canadian federal election
Party	Candidate	Votes
Conservative	John Dowsley Reid	1,397
Liberal	John Carruthers	1,290

1900 Canadian federal election
Party	Candidate	Votes
Conservative	John Dowsley Reid	1,475
Liberal	John Carruthers	1,351

== See also ==
- List of Canadian electoral districts
- Historical federal electoral districts of Canada
