= Arza Casselman =

Canadian politician

Arza Casselman QC
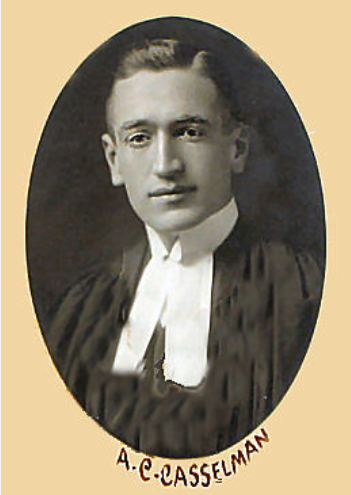
- Casselman in 1915

Member of Parliament
- In office October 29, 1925 – May 11, 1958
- Preceded by: Riding established
- Succeeded by: Jean Casselman Wadds
- Constituency: Grenville—Dundas
- In office December 6, 1921 – December 27, 1921
- Preceded by: John Dowsley Reid
- Succeeded by: Arthur Meighen
- Constituency: Grenville

Personal details
- Born: Arza Clair Casselman; January 19, 1891 Mariatown, Ontario, Canada
- Died: May 11, 1958 (aged 67)
- Party: Progressive Conservative (since 1945)
- Other political affiliations: Conservative (until 1945)
- Spouse(s): Dorothy Chalmers (m. 1920; died 1921) Elizabeth Mundle (m. 1925, died) Jean Rowe (m. 1946)
- Children: 4
- Education: Osgoode Hall Law School

Arza Clair Casselman, QC (January 19, 1891 – May 11, 1958) was a Canadian lawyer and political figure in Ontario, Canada. He represented Grenville in 1921 and then Grenville—Dundas from 1925 to 1958 in the House of Commons of Canada as a Conservative and later Progressive Conservative member.

== Personal life ==
=== Early life and education ===
Casselman was born January 19, 1891, in Mariatown, Ontario, located in what was then Williamsburg Township (now, the municipality of South Dundas) in the United Counties of Stormont, Dundas and Glengarry. Casselman was the son of Michael and Almeda Casselman, who were married in 1872. His mother was born in Williamsburg Township in 1851 and his father was born in Matilda Township in 1848, now also part of South Dundas. His family was likely descended from the first Casselmans to settle in Dundas County, who arrived in Canada around 1784 from the Mohawk Valley, New York, as United Empire Loyalists.

Casselman's father Michael was also involved in politics, but at the municipal level. Michael Casselman was elected to the Stormont, Dundas and Glengarry Counties Council in 1899 and was chosen as Counties Warden in 1903. Witnessing his father being actively engaged in local politics perhaps had some influence on A. C. Casselman's future political interests.

Casselman received his secondary education in Morrisburg, Ontario, at the Morrisburg Collegiate Institute before attending Osgoode Hall Law School in Toronto where he received his degree in law. After his graduation from Osgoode Hall, Casselman was called to the bar in 1915.

=== Military service ===
Casselman put his career in law on hold shortly after being called to the bar in 1915 as World War I was being fought. He instead joined the Canadian Army at 26 years old where he served overseas during the war as a gunner in the 10th Canadian Siege Battery. Around 1918, after World War I had ended, Casselman was discharged from the Canadian Army.

=== Adulthood ===
In 1919, Casselman moved to the town of Prescott, Ontario, where he purchased a law practice from a local solicitor named John K. Dowsley. Dowsley was selling the practice as he had been recently appointed as a provincial court judge. Shortly after Casselman moved to Prescott and purchased his practice, he became heavily involved in municipal, provincial, and federal politics.

In 1926, he purchased the Isaac Wiser House in Prescott (now 741 King St. West), which was designated a heritage property by the municipality in 1996.

In 1931, Casselman was named King's Counsel (later Queen's Counsel during the reign of Queen Elizabeth II), which is a high honour for any barrister.

=== Marriages ===
In 1920, Casselman married Dorothy Chalmers, daughter of Annie and Fred Chalmers from Morrisburg, Ontario. She died in 1921. In 1925, he was married for the second time, this time to Elizabeth Mundle, daughter of Florence and John A. Mundle. Casselman and his new wife moved into Mayfield House on Wood Street in the town of Prescott, which was purchased immediately following their marriage. The couple had two children, Clifford Mundle, born in 1927, and Richard Clair, born in 1929.

In 1946, Casselman was remarried for a third time after his second wife Elizabeth died. He wed Jean Rowe, the daughter of Earl Rowe and his wife, Treva, from Newton-Robinson, Simcoe County. The couple had two children: Nancy Jean, born in 1948, and William Clair, born in 1952.

== Political career ==
Casselman's immediate and avid interest in all branches of politics upon his arrival in Prescott in 1919 led him to befriend politician J. D. Reid, a Prescott native who at the time had been MP for the Grenville riding for nearly three decades. When Reid retired from that office in 1921 after being appointed to the senate, it cleared the way for Casselman's first federal election. In 1921, he was elected as MP for the first time in the Grenville riding. The following year he resigned this seat to Rt. Hon. Arthur Meighen, a fellow Conservative leader, to allow Meighen to run successfully in an upcoming by-election.

In 1924 the federal electoral district of Grenville was abolished when the county's riding was amalgamated with that of Dundas to become a new district known as Grenville-Dundas. In 1925, a federal election was held to determine who would be the first representative for the new electoral district in the House of Commons. The candidates were A. C. Casselman for the Conservative party and William Garnet Anderson for the Liberal party. Casselman won the election with 8,175 votes to Anderson's 5,221 votes. This was the start of Casselman's 33 consecutive years as MP for Grenville-Dundas.

After winning the 1925 election, Casselman sought re-election in 1926 and again won, this time against Progressive candidate Preston Elliot. Casselman went on to be re-elected as MP in the next eight federal elections, taking place in 1930, 1935, 1940, 1945, 1949, 1953, 1957, and 1958. During the 1925, 1926, 1930 and 1935 federal elections Casselman represented the Conservative party, while in the 1940 election he represented the National Government party. During the last five federal elections he ran for, in 1945, 1949, 1953, 1957, and 1958, Casselman represented the Progressive Conservatives.

In 1935, Casselman was appointed by Rt. Hon. R. B. Bennett as Chief Whip for the Conservative party, with subsequent appointments by R. J. Manion, John Bracken, and George Drew. He maintained this post for 20 years, resigning in 1955 due to poor health.

An important moment in Casselman's political career was his 1941 trip to the United Kingdom with Hon. R. B. Hanson and other ministers, during which the men had audiences with Anthony Eden, Winston Churchill, Lord Alexander, and the entire British cabinet.

== Later life and death ==
In 1958, Casselman was elected as Grenville-Dundas' MP for the final time, and was appointed Deputy Chairman of the House of Commons Committee by then Prime Minister John Diefenbaker. The 1958 federal election won by Casselman would be the last election he would ever run for, as he died on May 11, 1958, just months after the March 1958 election was held. Casselman was 67 years old. Later that year, his wife Jean succeeded him as MP for Grenville-Dundas.
