= William Thomas Benson =

Canadian politician

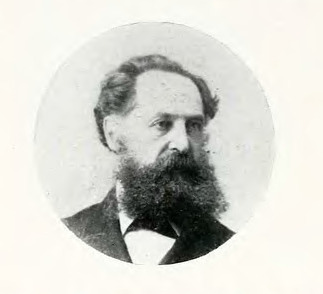

Member of the Canadian Parliament for Grenville South
- In office 1882–1885
- Preceded by: John Philip Wiser
- Succeeded by: Walter Shanly

Personal details
- Born: 20 April 1824 Kendal, England
- Died: 8 June 1885 (aged 61) Cardinal, Ontario, Canada
- Party: Conservative Party
- Occupation: businessman, farmer

William Thomas Benson (20 April 1824 – 8 June 1885) was born at Kendal, England and, after some years in business in England, immigrated to Canada in 1858.

In Montreal, Benson met a man with whom he formed a partnership to open the first starch factory in Canada. Benson and Aspden established a starch factory in 1858 in the village of Edwardsburg (Cardinal), Canada West. This enterprise eventually evolved into the Canada Starch Company in 1906 under his son, George Frederick Benson.

He was elected to the House of Commons of Canada in 1882 to represent the riding of Grenville South. He died in office in 1885 in Cardinal, Ontario.

== Starch factory ==
In 1858 William Thomas Benson, along with his business partner Thomas Aspden, constructed, owned and operated the first corn wet-milling factory in Canada, located in Cardinal, Ontario. The plant is additionally notable for being the first to produce high-fructose corn syrup in Canada and, more recently, for being one of the oldest industries in Canada. The factory was originally named Benson & Aspden after its founders; when both men sold their shares in the 1860s, it became known as the Edwardsburg Starch Company and later the Canada Starch Company (CASCO). As of 1954, the factory is a wholly owned subsidiary of Ingredion Inc., and produces corn syrup solids, dextrose, maltodextrin as well as starch.

Benson and Aspden purchased land beside the St. Lawrence River along the old Galop Canal in Cardinal in 1858 and built the first factory within the year. The village of Cardinal was chosen due to the canal, which provided a waterway, as well as the St. Lawrence River's rapids which provided a power source; the Grand Trunk Railway line was also in close proximity. The first factory was located where Building 17 of the modern plant currently sits. The original factory consisted of a main building, where the starch was produced, as well as numerous outbuildings including a boiler house, office, and employee store. The first factory had a capacity of 200 bushels per day. Early products manufactured by the company included Benson's Prepared Corn, Silver Gloss Starch, and Crystal Laundry Starch – No. 1.

In 1860, Benson became sole owner of the company after purchasing Aspden's shares and renamed the company W.T. Benson & Company. Benson required more capital in 1865 which led him to sell off his own shares to a group of investors. The business was then renamed Edwardsburg Starch Company. Benson maintained an executive position as vice-president and managing director of the company after selling to investors, which he held until his death in 1885.

After Benson's death, his son and grandson stayed involved with the company until 1953 and 1961, respectively, and the company continued to expand. The Cardinal plant was rebuilt in the 1920s and since that time has expanded and undergone numerous upgrades. In the 1980s, two other CASCO plants were built in Ontario, one in Port Colborne and one in London.
