= John Philip Wiser =

Canadian politician

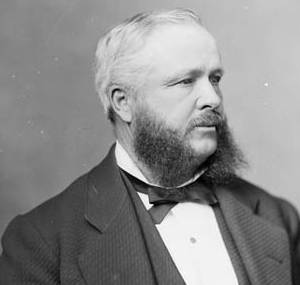
John Philip Wiser Source: Library and Archives Canada

John Philip (J.P.) Wiser (October 4, 1825 – April 30, 1911) was an American-born Canadian distiller, manufacturer, rancher and political figure. His whisky distillery was the third largest in Canada, and he served a term as a Liberal Member of Parliament for the Grenville South district, from 1878 to 1882.

== Early life ==
Wiser was born in Oneida County, New York, the son of Isaac J. Wiser and Mary Egert. In 1856, he married Emily, the daughter of Harlow Godard.

== Distillery ==
Wiser moved to Prescott, Ontario in 1857 to work for his maternal uncle, Charles Egert, who owned the local Charles Payne Distillery and Farm with business partner Amos Averell.

Wiser started as manager of the distillery. Five years later he bought out Egert and Averell to become sole owner of the distillery and farm. At the time, the distiller was producing 116,500 gallons of whisky a year. By the time of the American Civil War, Wiser's Red Letter Rye was sold in Canada and Wiser's Canada Whisky was for export.

Wiser introduced whisky in bottles at the Chicago World's Fair in 1893. Prior to this time, whisky was only sold in casks or barrels. Wiser's son, Harlow, operated the distillery to an output of 500,000 gallons a year, but he died in 1895 at the age of 36 from a heart attack.

By the early 1900s, Wiser was exporting whisky around the world and his distillery in Prescott became the third largest in Canada behind Hiram Walker's in Windsor and Gooderham & Worts' in Toronto. By 1935, all three of these competitors operated under the same majority owner.

Wiser's large farm raised cattle and racing horses.

After Wiser's death, the distillery in Prescott was merged with Corby Distilleries. His name continues today on several brands of J.P. Wiser Whisky, including his original Red Letter Rye.

Parliament of Canada
Preceded by William Henry Brouse	Member of Parliament for Grenville South; 1878–1882	Succeeded by William Thomas Benson
