= Margaret Jean Anderson =

Canadian businesswoman and politician

The Honourable Margaret Jean Anderson

Senator for Northumberland-Miramichi, New Brunswick
- In office March 23, 1978 – August 7, 1990
- Appointed by: Pierre Trudeau

Personal details
- Born: August 7, 1915 Burnt Church, New Brunswick
- Died: December 8, 2003 (aged 88) Miramichi, New Brunswick
- Party: Liberal
- Relations: William Stafford Anderson, father

Margaret Jean Anderson (August 7, 1915 – December 8, 2003) was a Canadian businesswoman and senator. Born in Burnt Church, New Brunswick, she was president of the family business, W.S. Anderson and Company Ltd., a lumber company. From 1972 to 1976, she was president of the New Brunswick Women's Liberal Association. In 1978, she was summoned to the senate on the advice of Pierre Trudeau representing the senatorial division of Northumberland--Miramichi, New Brunswick. She sat as a member of the Liberal Party of Canada and retired at the age of 75 in 1990.

Anderson was a past president of the United Church Women (UCW), and a former member of the St. James & St. John's United Church, as well as of the Miramichi Historical Society, and Newcastle Curling Club.

== Early life and education ==
She was born on July 7, 1914 in Burnt Church, New Brunswick to Huldah Helen Jan Morrison and William Stafford Anderson. She attended Harkins Academy in Newcastle. Her father had been a minister for 17 years in the provincial cabinet.

== Career ==
She was president member of the National Women's Liberal Commission, and the New Brunswick Women's Liberal Association, serving as president from 1972 to 1976.

She was president of W.S. Anderson and Co. Ltd, a lumber firm in Newcastle. She was involved in the Miramichi Environmental Society, the Miramichi Historial Society, the Miramichi Heritage Trust, the Historic Sites Commission, and the United Church Women. She was also involved with the Victorian Order of Nurses and the Canadian Girls In Training.

=== Senator ===
On March 23, 1978, she was summoned to the Canadian Senate by P. Trudeau.

She was a Liberal Senator for Notherumberland-Miramichi from 1978 to 1990. She was on the Banking, Trade and Commerce Committee.

== Personal life ==
She lived in Newcastle, New Brunswick, traveling to the Senate in Ottawa during sessions. She died on 8 December, 2003, at the age of 83, and laid to rest in Miramichi.

Anderson died in Miramichi, New Brunswick on December 8, 2003

== See also ==
- Women in the 28th–32nd Canadian Parliaments
