= Maria Grant =

Maria Grant (born Maria Heathfield Pollard, 1854 − 1937) was an early Canadian women's rights activist in British Columbia and first woman in Canada elected to any political office.

== Early life ==
Grant was born in Quebec City, Quebec.

== Career ==
In 1895 Grant was elected as the first female school board trustee in British Columbia.

She was active in the Woman's Christian Temperance Union and helped to found the Victoria Local Council of Women in 1894 which was created to facilitate communication between women and women's organizations to discuss the issues pertinent in their community. The Victoria Local Council of Women went on to become the first Council in Canada to endorse women's suffrage and Maria Grant was honored by the Council for her more than 30 years of work towards women's suffrage in 1987.

== Personal life ==
Grant married marine engineer Gordon Grant in Victoria in 1874. She had nine children, of which seven survived to adulthood.
