= William Stafford Anderson =

Canadian politician

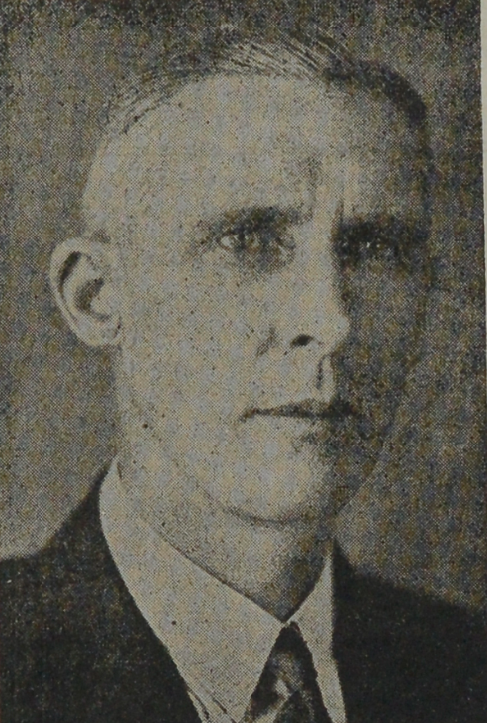
- Anderson, pictured in a 1946 newspaper

Member of the Legislative Assembly of New Brunswick
- In office 1930–1956
- Constituency: Northumberland

Personal details
- Born: February 16, 1884 Burnt Church, New Brunswick
- Died: March 28, 1980 (aged 96) Newcastle, New Brunswick
- Party: New Brunswick Liberal Association
- Spouse: H. Helen Morrison (m. 1910)
- Occupation: lumberman

William Stafford Anderson (February 16, 1884 – March 28, 1980) was a lumberman and political figure in New Brunswick, Canada. He represented Northumberland County in the Legislative Assembly of New Brunswick from 1930 to 1956 as a Liberal member.

He was born in Burnt Church, New Brunswick, the son of William Anderson and Janet Sewell. In 1910 he married H. Helen Morrison. He lived in Newcastle and maintained a summer home at Burnt Church.

Anderson was variously Minister of Lands and Mines and Chairman of the New Brunswick Electric Power Commission, both cabinet positions.

Stafford Anderson's daughter, Margaret Jean Anderson represented New Brunswick in the Senate of Canada. His son, Royce Anderson, was a Newcastle businessman and longtime powerhouse in the Liberal Party of the Miramichi.
