= William Henry Brouse =

Canadian politician (1824–1881)

The Honourable William Henry Brouse
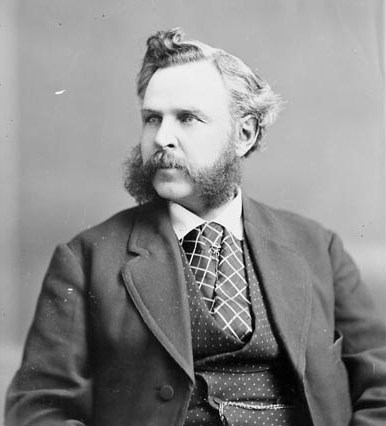

Member of Parliament for Grenville South
- In office 1872–1878
- Preceded by: Walter Shanly
- Succeeded by: John Philip Wiser

Canadian Senator from Ontario
- In office August 9, 1878 – August 23, 1881
- Appointed by: Alexander Mackenzie

Personal details
- Born: June 15, 1824 Matilda Township, Dundas County, Upper Canada
- Died: August 23, 1881 (aged 57) Ottawa, Ontario, Canada
- Party: Liberal

Military service
- Allegiance: Canada
- Branch/service: Canadian Militia
- Years of service: 1867-1880s
- Rank: Surgeon
- Unit: 56th (Grenville) Battalion of Infantry
- Battles/wars: Fenian Raids

William Henry Brouse (June 15, 1824 – August 23, 1881) was a Canadian medical doctor and politician.

Born in Matilda Township, Dundas County, Upper Canada of German ancestry, his father was Colonel Jacob Brouse of the Dundas Militia who was one of the first to fire upon the American Army at the Battle of Point Iroquois and commanded the 4th (Winchester) Battalion in the 1850s.

== Background ==
William Brouse attended Upper Canada Academy in Cobourg, Canada West in 1839, Victoria College until 1845, and received his Doctor of Medicine degree in 1847 from McGill College.

He was first elected to the House of Commons of Canada representing the Ontario riding of Grenville South in the 1872 federal election. A Liberal, he was re-elected in 1874. He was nominated to the Senate of Canada in 1878 representing the senatorial division of Prescott, Ontario, and sat as a Reformer until his death in 1881.

He was commissioned as the Surgeon of the 56th (Grenville) Battalion of Infantry on April 12, 1867, and was active in matters of the Canadian Militia. He successfully campaigned for, a $50,000 annual grant for the veterans of the War of 1812 and he proposed, unsuccessfully, that recognition be granted to the militia veterans of the rebellions of 1837–38.

He was the nephew of George Brouse, an Upper Canada MP.

== Electoral record ==
1867 Canadian federal election: Grenville South
Party	Candidate	Votes
Conservative	Walter Shanly	899
Unknown	William Patrick	730

Result by municipality

Municipality	Shanly	Patrick	Total vote	Eligible voters
Augusta Township	389	306	695	818
Edwardsburgh Township	338	283	621	720
Prescott East Ward	64	51	115	149
Prescott West Ward	61	46	107	159
Prescott South Ward	47	44	91	128
Total	899	720	1,629	1,974

1872 Canadian federal election: Grenville South
Party	Candidate	Votes
Liberal	William Henry Brouse	951
Conservative	Walter Shanly	866

1874 Canadian federal election: Grenville South
Party	Candidate	Votes
Liberal	William Henry Brouse	1,106
Conservative	Walter Shanly	995
