= Grenville (federal electoral district) =

Former federal electoral district in Ontario, Canada

Ontario electoral district

Defunct federal electoral district
- Legislature: House of Commons
- District created: 1903
- District abolished: 1924
- First contested: 1904
- Last contested: 1922 by-election

Grenville was a federal electoral district represented in the House of Commons of Canada from 1904 to 1925. It was located in the province of Ontario. This riding was created in 1903 from parts of Grenville South and Leeds North and Grenville North ridings. It consisted of the county of Grenville.

The electoral district was abolished in 1924 when it was merged into Grenville—Dundas riding.

== Members of Parliament ==
This riding has elected the following members of Parliament:

| Parliament | Years | Member | Party |
|---|---|---|---|
Riding created from Grenville South and Leeds North and Grenville North
| 10th | 1904–1908 | John Dowsley Reid | Conservative |
| 11th | 1908–1911 | John Dowsley Reid | Conservative |
| 12th | 1911–1911 | John Dowsley Reid | Conservative |
| 12th | 1911–1917 | John Dowsley Reid | Conservative |
| 13th | 1917–1921 | John Dowsley Reid | Government (Unionist) |
| 14th | 1921–1921 | Arza Clair Casselman | Conservative |
| 14th | 1922–1925 | Arthur Meighen | Conservative |
Riding dissolved into Grenville—Dundas

== Election results ==
1904 Canadian federal election
| Party | Candidate | Votes | % |
|---|---|---|---|
| Conservative | John Dowsley Reid | 2,239 | 58.2 |
| Liberal | John Edwards | 1,607 | 41.8 |
| Total valid votes | | 3,846 | |
| Total rejected ballots | | 24 | |
| Turnout | | 3,870 | 66.89 |
| Eligible voters | | 5,786 | |
Source: Elections Canada and Canada Elections Database

1908 Canadian federal election
| Party | Candidate | Votes | % | ±% |
|---|---|---|---|---|
| Conservative | John Dowsley Reid | 2,380 | 57.7 | -0.5 |
| Liberal | Samuel John Martin | 1,745 | 42.3 | +0.5 |
| Total valid votes | | 4,125 | | |
| Total rejected ballots | | 31 | | |
| Turnout | | 4,156 | 74.64 | +7.75 |
| Eligible voters | | 5,568 | | |
Source: Elections Canada and Canada Elections Database

1911 Canadian federal election
| Party | Candidate | Votes | % | ±% |
|---|---|---|---|---|
| Conservative | John Dowsley Reid | 2,286 | 62.5 | +4.8 |
| Unknown | Samuel John Martin | 1,373 | 37.5 | -4.8 |
| Total valid votes | | 3,659 | | |
Source: Elections Canada and Canada Elections Database

Canadian federal by-election, 27 October 1911 John Dowsley Reid appointed Minister of Customs on 10 October 1911
| Party | Candidate | Votes |
|---|---|---|
| Conservative | John Dowsley Reid | acclaimed |
Source: Elections Canada

1917 Canadian federal election
| Party | Candidate | Votes | % | ±% |
|---|---|---|---|---|
| Government (Unionist) | John Dowsley Reid | 3,011 | 63.5 | +1.0 |
| Opposition (Laurier Liberals) | Pember Alton MacKintosh | 1,734 | 36.5 | -1.0 |
| Total valid votes | | 4,475 | | |
Note: Change is based on 1911 General Election
Source: Elections Canada and Canada Elections Database

1921 Canadian federal election
| Party | Candidate | Votes | % | ±% |
|---|---|---|---|---|
| Conservative | Arza Clair Casselman | 4,325 | 49.5 | -14.0 |
| Progressive | George Arthur Payne | 2,392 | 27.4 | +27.4 |
| Liberal | Pember Alton MacIntosh | 2,014 | 23.1 | -13.4 |
| Total valid votes | | 8,731 | | |
Source: Elections Canada and Canada Elections Database

Canadian federal by-election, 26 January 1922 Arza Clair Casselman accepted an office of emolument under the Crown on 27 December 1921
| Party | Candidate | Votes | % | ±% |
|---|---|---|---|---|
| Conservative | Arthur Meighen | 4,482 | 61.4 | +11.9 |
| Progressive | Arthur Kidd Patterson | 2,820 | 38.6 | +11.2 |
| Total valid votes | | 7,302 | | |
Source: Elections Canada

== See also ==
- List of Canadian electoral districts
- Historical federal electoral districts of Canada
