= John Dowsley Reid =

Canadian politician

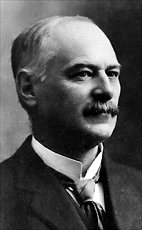
The Honourable John Dowsley Reid, PC

John Dowsley Reid, PC (1 January 1859 – 26 August 1929) was a Canadian businessman, physician, and parliamentarian. A Conservative, he was a long-standing Member of Parliament in the House of Commons of Canada for the Ontario Electoral district of Grenville South (named simply Grenville after 1903). He was first elected in the Canadian federal election of 1891 and was re-elected seven more times.

== Background ==
During his years in the House of Commons, he served as a cabinet minister in a variety of posts in the Cabinet of Canada, including:

- Minister of Customs (10 October 1911 – 11 October 1917)
- Minister of Railways and Canals (12 October 1917 – 20 September 1921)
- Minister of Customs and Inland Revenue (Acting) 2 September 1919 – 30 December 1919)
- Minister of Public Works (Acting) (6 August 1919 – 2 September 1919) and (31 December 1919 – 12 July 1920)

On 22 September 1921, he was appointed to the Senate of Canada on the recommendation of Arthur Meighen. He represented the senatorial division of Grenville, Ontario until his death.

== Electoral record ==
1891 Canadian federal election: Grenville South
| Party | Candidate | Votes |
|---|---|---|
| Conservative | John Dowsley Reid | 1,414 |
| Liberal | John Carruthers | 1,303 |

1896 Canadian federal election: Grenville South
| Party | Candidate | Votes |
|---|---|---|
| Conservative | John Dowsley Reid | 1,397 |
| Liberal | John Carruthers | 1,290 |

1900 Canadian federal election: Grenville South
| Party | Candidate | Votes |
|---|---|---|
| Conservative | John Dowsley Reid | 1,475 |
| Liberal | John Carruthers | 1,351 |

Parliament of Canada
| Preceded by Walter Shanly, Conservative | Member of Parliament for Grenville South; 1891–1904 | Succeeded by riding abolished |
| Preceded by riding created | Member of Parliament for Grenville; 1904–1921 | Succeeded by Arza Casselman, Conservative |
