= Walter Shanly =

Canadian politician (1817–1899)

Member of the Canadian Parliament for Grenville South
- In office 1867–1872
- Preceded by: District was created by the Constitution Act, 1867
- Succeeded by: William Henry Brouse
- In office 1885–1891
- Preceded by: William Henry Brouse
- Succeeded by: John Dowsley Reid

Personal details
- Born: 11 October 1817 Stradbally, County Laois, Ireland
- Died: 17 December 1899 (aged 82)
- Party: Conservative

Walter Shanly (11 October 1817 – 17 December 1899) was a Canadian civil engineer, author, businessman, and politician. He was known for his work on railways and canals but was overshadowed by his brother, Francis Shanly.

Born in Stradbally, County Laois, Ireland, the son James Shanly and Frances Elizabeth Mulvany, he immigrated to Upper Canada in 1836.

In 1863, he was elected to the Legislative Assembly of the Province of Canada for the riding of Grenville South. In 1867, he was elected to the House of Commons of Canada for the riding of Greenville South. A Conservative, he was defeated in 1872 and 1874. He returned to politics upon the death of the current MP, William Thomas Benson, who died in 1885. He was acclaimed in the resulting by-election and was re-elected in 1887. On Mr. Benson's death, 8 June 1885:

By-election on 4 July 1885
Party	Candidate	Votes
Conservative	Walter Shanly	acclaimed

1887 Canadian federal election: Grenville South
Party	Candidate	Votes
Conservative	Walter Shanly	1,407
Liberal	William McDougall	1,187
