= Mary Theresa King-Myers =

First female municipal councillor in rural Canada

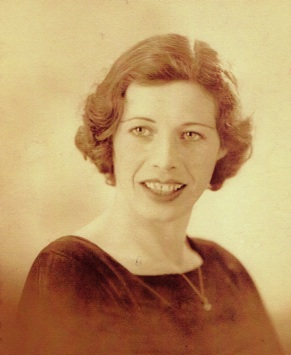
King-Myers around 1940

Mary Theresa King-Myers was a Canadian politician who served as the first female municipal councillor in rural Canada.

== Career ==
King-Myers was first elected to Halifax County council in 1938, retiring in 1949 before successfully re-offering in the 1950s. She continued to serve on council until 1967.

During the 1939 royal visit, King-Myers was presented to King George VI as representative of the women of Halifax County. She gave a ceremonial gift of a bouquet plucked from the Halifax Public Gardens to Queen Elizabeth.

On March 4, 1938, King-Myers moved an amendment to establish a poor section in the county; however, the motion was not supported by other councillors. Work to establish a poor section, or county home, had been underway since 1927 when the initial plan for the building was submitted. King-Myers voiced her support of the county home plan in 1939, stating it had been delayed and moving an amendment to include the issue as a plebiscite during the next election. This amendment found no support from other councillors.

In 1945, King-Myers supported a proposal to create a physical education program and increase teacher salaries in Halifax County schools. During a meeting of council on March 4, she stated she was "strongly in favour of anything designed to improve health and education". The proposal moved forward with approval of all councillors.

King-Myers was a supporter of the shopmobile program, a government-funded initiative to provide mobile industrial education workshops to students in rural Nova Scotia. The workshops were constructed on trucks and equipped to teach woodworking, metalworking, leatherworking, and blacksmithing. Two mobile workshops were launched in 1942 in Antigonish and Kings County, and the project proved to be successful. During a meeting of council on March 15, 1946, King-Myers stated that she was "very much interested in the shopmobile service, and is anxious that it be established."

King-Myers voted in favour of adopting the Department of Education's rural high school program and establishing a rural high school in the Musquodoboit Valley area during a council meeting on March 12, 1947. The school opened in 1951 as Musquodoboit Rural High School.

== Personal life ==
King-Myers was of the fifth generation to live in the King house in Wellington. She was the granddaughter of William Michael King, and the daughter of William James King, who had served on council from 1923 to 1938.

== See also ==
- Women in Canadian politics
- Maxine Cochran (1926–2014), first female cabinet minister in Nova Scotia
- Moira Leiper Ducharme, first female mayor of Halifax
- Gladys Porter (1893–1967), first woman to be elected mayor in the Maritimes and first female MLA in Nova Scotia
