= Kathryn Cholette =

Canadian politician

Kathryn Cholette is a Canadian politician who served as leader of the Green Party of Canada from 1988 to 1990. Just prior to the end of her term as leader, Cholette publicly resigned her post in an article entitled "Why I Left the Green Party". She was the first woman elected to lead a federal political party in Canada, preceding Audrey McLaughlin by a year.
