= Jean Casselman Wadds =

Canadian politician

Jean Casselman Wadds OC
- Official portrait, 1966

Canadian High Commissioner to the United Kingdom
- In office October 25, 1979 – January 14, 1983
- Prime Minister: Joe Clark; Pierre Trudeau
- Preceded by: Paul Martin Sr.
- Succeeded by: Donald Jamieson

Member of Parliament for Grenville—Dundas
- In office September 29, 1958 – June 24, 1968
- Preceded by: Arza Clair Casselman
- Succeeded by: Riding abolished

Personal details
- Born: Jean Rowe; September 16, 1920 Newton Robinson, Ontario, Canada
- Died: November 25, 2011 (aged 91) Prescott, Ontario, Canada
- Party: Progressive Conservative
- Spouses: Arza Clair Casselman (m. 1946; died 1958) Robert Wadds (divorced)
- Relations: William Earl Rowe (father)
- Portfolio: Parliamentary Secretary to the Minister of National Health and Welfare (1962–1963)

Jean Casselman Wadds OC (née Rowe; September 16, 1920 – November 25, 2011) was a Canadian politician, who represented the electoral district of Grenville—Dundas from 1958 to 1968. She sat as a member of the Progressive Conservative Party. She served as Canadian High Commissioner to the United Kingdom from 1979 to 1983, playing a role in the government of Pierre Trudeau's negotiations with the British government of Margaret Thatcher in Trudeau's successful effort to patriate the Canadian Constitution in 1982.

== Early life and political career ==
Wadds was born in 1920 in Newton Robinson, Ontario. She was the daughter of William Earl Rowe; Wadds and Rowe are, to date, the only father and daughter to sit as MPs in the same session of Parliament.

In 1946, she married Arza Clair Casselman, who represented Grenville—Dundas in the House of Commons until his death in 1958, and she was elected to the same seat later that year. She married stockbroker Robert Wadds in the 1960s; their marriage ended in divorce after a decade.

Wadds served as parliamentary secretary to the Minister of Health and Welfare in 1962 and 1963. She was the first woman to serve as a parliamentary secretary in the Canadian government.

She was defeated in the 1968 federal election in the redistributed riding of Grenville—Carleton but remained politically active, serving from 1971 to 1975 as national secretary of the Progressive Conservative party. She served on the Ontario Municipal Board in the late 1970s.

== High Commissioner to the United Kingdom ==
In 1979, Wadds was appointed Canada's High Commissioner to the United Kingdom. She served in this capacity until 1983. During this time, the Canadian Constitution was patriated. Prime Minister Pierre Trudeau was to say of her:

"I always said it was thanks to three women that we were eventually able to reform our Constitution. The Queen, who was favourable, Margaret Thatcher, who undertook to do everything that our Parliament asked of her, and Jean Wadds, who represented the interests of Canada so well in London."

In 1982, she was made an Officer of the Order of Canada for carrying "out her duties with great competence and conscientiousness, particularly during the period of the patriation of the Constitution".

== Macdonald Commission and later career ==
Returning to Canada in 1983, she was appointed one of 13 commissioners on the Macdonald Commission into the economic future of Canada. The Royal Commission's recommendations that Canada negotiate a free trade agreement with the United States were ultimately taken up by the government of Brian Mulroney, resulting in the Canada–United States Free Trade Agreement of 1988.

She subsequently served on a number of corporate boards including Bell Canada, Canadian Pacific and Royal Trust.

Casselman Wadds received honorary doctorates from the University of Toronto, Dalhousie University, Acadia University and St. Thomas University.

On November 25, 2011, Wadds died at the age of 91.
