= Grenville—Dundas (federal electoral district) =

Former federal electoral district in Ontario, Canada

Ontario electoral district

Defunct federal electoral district
- Legislature: House of Commons
- District created: 1925
- District abolished: 1966
- First contested: 1925
- Last contested: 1965

Grenville—Dundas was a federal electoral district represented in the House of Commons of Canada from 1925 to 1968. It was located in the province of Ontario. This riding was created in 1925 from parts of Dundas and Grenville ridings.

It consisted of the counties of Grenville and Dundas.

The electoral district was abolished in 1966 when it was redistributed between Grenville—Carleton and Stormont—Dundas ridings.

== Members of Parliament ==
This riding elected the following members of the House of Commons of Canada:

Parliament	Years	Member	Party
Riding created from Dundas and Grenville
15th	1925–1926	Arza Clair Casselman	Conservative
16th	1926–1930	Arza Clair Casselman	Conservative
17th	1930–1935	Arza Clair Casselman	Conservative
18th	1935–1940	Arza Clair Casselman	Conservative
19th	1940–1945	Arza Clair Casselman	National Government
20th	1945–1949	Arza Clair Casselman	Progressive Conservative
21st	1949–1953	Arza Clair Casselman	Progressive Conservative
22nd	1953–1957	Arza Clair Casselman	Progressive Conservative
23rd	1957–1958	Arza Clair Casselman	Progressive Conservative
24th	1958–1958†	Arza Clair Casselman	Progressive Conservative
24th	1958–1962	Jean Casselman (Wadds)	Progressive Conservative
25th	1962–1963	Jean Casselman (Wadds)	Progressive Conservative
26th	1963–1965	Jean Casselman (Wadds)	Progressive Conservative
27th	1965–1968	Jean Casselman (Wadds)	Progressive Conservative
Riding dissolved into Grenville—Carleton and Stormont—Dundas

== Election results ==
1925 Canadian federal election
Party	Candidate	Votes	%
Conservative	Arza Clair Casselman	8,175	61.0
Liberal	William Garnet Anderson	5,221	39.0
Total valid votes		13,396	
Turnout (based on valid votes; total votes not available)		13,396	65.76
Eligible voters		20,370	
Source: Elections Canada and Canada Elections Database

1926 Canadian federal election
Party	Candidate	Votes	%	±%
Conservative	Arza Clair Casselman	8,100	63.0	+2.0
Progressive	Preston Elliott	4,744	37.0	-2.0
Total valid votes		12,844		
Turnout (based on valid votes and estimated eligible voters)		12,844	~62.35	-~3.41
Eligible voters (estimated from 1920 and 1926 elections)		~20,600		
Source: Elections Canada and Canada Elections Database

1930 Canadian federal election
Party	Candidate	Votes	%	±%
Conservative	Arza Clair Casselman	9,498	65.2	+2.2
Liberal	William John Taugher	5,078	34.8	-2.2
Total valid votes		14,576		
Turnout (based on valid votes; total votes not available)		14,576	70.6	+~8.25
Eligible voters		20,645		
Source: Elections Canada and Canada Elections Database

1935 Canadian federal election
Party	Candidate	Votes	%	±%
Conservative	Arza Clair Casselman	8,936	52.2	-13.0
Liberal	Preston Elliott	6,581	38.4	+3.6
Reconstruction	Claude Allison Patterson	1,615	9.4	+9.4
Total valid votes		17,132		
Turnout (based on valid votes; total votes not available)		17,132	77.71	+7.11
Eligible voters		22,044		
Source: Elections Canada and Canada Elections Database

1940 Canadian federal election
Party	Candidate	Votes	%	±%
National Government	Arza Clair Casselman	7,225	56.2	+4.0
Liberal	William John Taugher	5,642	43.8	+5.4
Total valid votes		12,867		
Turnout (based on valid votes; total votes not available)		12,867	57.65	-20.06
Eligible voters		22,320		
Source: Elections Canada and Canada Elections Database

1945 Canadian federal election
Party	Candidate	Votes	%	±%
Progressive Conservative	Arza Clair Casselman	9,306	63.6	+7.4
Liberal	James Franklin Casselman	4,634	31.7	-12.1
Co-operative Commonwealth	James Shortt	685	4.7	+4.7
Total valid votes		14,625		
Turnout (based on valid votes; total votes not available)		14,625	70.85	+13.2
Eligible voters		20,641		
Source: Elections Canada and Canada Elections Database

1949 Canadian federal election
Party	Candidate	Votes	%	±%
Progressive Conservative	Arza Clair Casselman	8,450	60.2	-3.4
Liberal	James Franklin Casselman	5,102	36.3	+4.6
Co-operative Commonwealth	Arthur Nelson Orr	496	3.5	-1.2
Total valid votes		14,048		
Total rejected ballots		108		
Turnout		14,156	66.64	-4.21
Eligible voters		21,244		
Source: Elections Canada and Canada Elections Database

1953 Canadian federal election
Party	Candidate	Votes	%	±%
Progressive Conservative	Arza Clair Casselman	8,875	64.3	+4.1
Liberal	Arthur Clark Casselman	4,933	35.7	-0.6
Total valid votes		13,808		
Total rejected ballots		103		
Turnout		13,911	65.16	-1.48
Eligible voters		21,348		
Source: Elections Canada and Canada Elections Database

1957 Canadian federal election
Party	Candidate	Votes	%	±%
Progressive Conservative	Arza Clair Casselman	8,967	62.1	-2.2
Liberal	Arthur C. Casselman	4,402	30.5	-5.2
Social Credit	R. H. James	1,072	7.4	+7.4
Total valid votes		14,441		
Total rejected ballots		130		
Turnout		14,571	66.05	+0.89
Eligible voters		22,060		
Source: Elections Canada and Canada Elections Database

1958 Canadian federal election
Party	Candidate	Votes	%	±%
Progressive Conservative	Arza Clair Casselman	10,793	69.2	+7.1
Liberal	Arthur Clark Casselman	4,340	27.8	-2.7
Social Credit	R. H. James	473	3.0	-4.4
Total valid votes		15,606		
Turnout (based on valid votes and estimated eligible voters)		15,606	~70.1	+~4.05
Eligible voters (estimated from 1957 election and 1958 by-election)		~22,000		
Source: Elections Canada and Canada Elections Database

Canadian federal by-election, 29 Sep 1958 Death of Arza Clair Casselman on 11 May 1958
Party	Candidate	Votes	%	±%
Progressive Conservative	Jean Casselman	10,309	65.7	-3.5
Liberal	Mark Salmon	5,379	34.3	+6.5
Total valid votes		15,688		
Turnout (based on valid votes; total votes not available)		15,688	71.3	+~1.2
Eligible voters		22,004		
Source: Elections Canada

1962 Canadian federal election
Party	Candidate	Votes	%	±%
Progressive Conservative	Jean Casselman	10,159	59.3	-6.4
Liberal	Robert Watters	6,410	37.4	+3.1
New Democratic	Reginald S. Libby	299	1.8	+1.8
Social Credit	Grace Catherine A. Gough	258	1.5	+1.5
Total valid votes		17,126		
Turnout (based on valid votes; total votes not available)		17,126	76.62	+5.32
Eligible voters		22,351		
Source: Elections Canada and Canada Elections Database

1963 Canadian federal election
Party	Candidate	Votes	%	±%
Progressive Conservative	Jean Casselman	10,434	58.0	-1.3
Liberal	John Palmer	7,207	40.0	+2.6
New Democratic	Reginald S. Libby	363	2.0	+0.2
Total valid votes		18,004		
Total rejected ballots		148		
Turnout		18,152	80.4	+3.78
Eligible voters		22,575		
Note: Elections Canada and the Canada Elections Database states that Palmer and Libby both received 7,207 votes, for a total vote count of 24,848. However, this is very inconsistent with reporting from several local newspapers, who reported that Libby only got several hundred votes. Since the newspapers were fairly consistent in the vote counts reported following the election, those are the numbers that have used in the chart above.
Source: Winchester Press, The Morrisburg Leader, Iroquois Post and Matilda Advocate, and Cornwall Standard-Freeholder

1965 Canadian federal election
Party	Candidate	Votes	%	±%
Progressive Conservative	Jean Casselman Wadds	9,845	56.7	-1.3
Liberal	John Palmer	6,930	39.9	-0.1
New Democratic	René Benoit	595	3.4	+1.4
Total valid votes		17,370		
Total rejected ballots		179		
Turnout		17,549	76.37	-4.03
Eligible voters		67,404		
Source: Elections Canada and Canada Elections Database

== See also ==
- List of Canadian electoral districts
- Historical federal electoral districts of Canada
