= Iva Campbell Fallis =

Canadian politician (1883–1956)

The Honourable Iva Campbell Fallis

Canadian Senator from Ontario
- In office July 20, 1935 – March 7, 1956

Personal details
- Born: June 23, 1883 Castleton, Ontario, Canada
- Died: March 7, 1956 (aged 72) Peterborough, Ontario, Canada
- Resting place: Little Lake Cemetery
- Party: Conservative (1935-1942); Progressive Conservative (1942-1956)
- Spouse: Howard Taylor Fallis (m. 1909)

Iva Campbell Fallis (June 23, 1883 – March 7, 1956) was the second female Canadian Senator.

== Early life and family ==
Iva Campbell Fallis was born on a Northumberland County farm near Castledon, Ontario, on June 23, 1883. Fallis was the daughter of Jessie Stewart and Michael John Doyle, the warden of the county. She attended the Toronto Normal School and became a school teacher. In 1909, she married Howard Taylor Fallis in Colborne, Ontario.

== Career ==
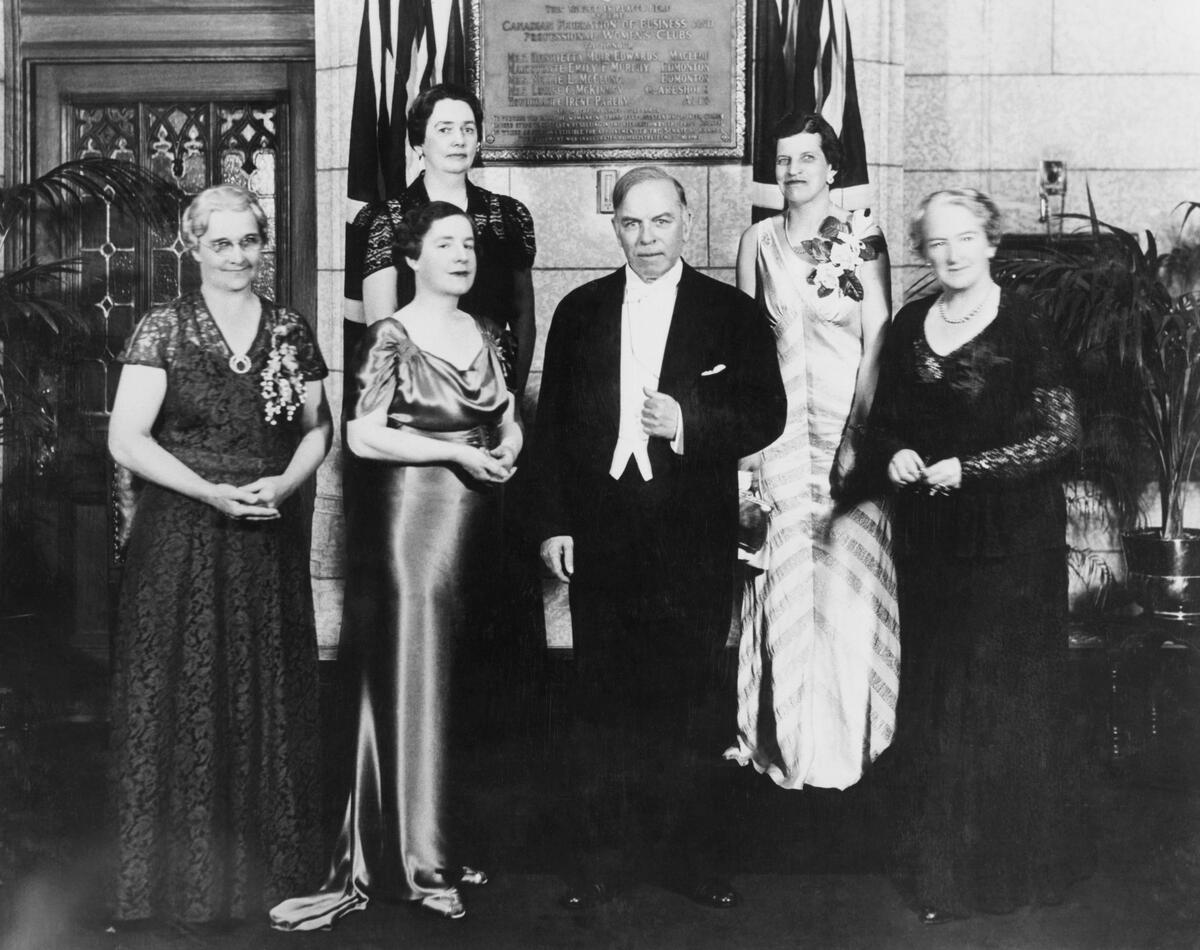
Prime Minister William Lyon Mackenzie King unveiled a plaque to the Valiant 5 in the Person's Case

Fallis' career began with her becoming a teacher in Bethany, ON, where she met Howard Taylor Fallis whom she would later marry in Colborne, ON in 1909. The pair farmed in Saskatchewan for several years until they moved to a farm near Peterborough, ON called Smith Township in 1917. It was around the time of them moving to Peterborough which marked the start of her political career. She resided there until her death in 1956.

In 1923, she became the first president of the Peterborough Conservative Women's Association. Fallis was a charter member (honorary) of Soroptimist International Peterborough (1945).She was vice president of the Ontario and Dominion Conservative Association and a key member of the campaign team that helped elect R.B. Bennett Prime Minister of Canada in 1930. She was appointed to the Senate by Bennett in 1935 and was the second female Senator after Cairine Wilson. She served until her death in 1956.

== Stance on women's rights ==
Fallis believed that men and women both had the responsibility to join the government in order to seek change. She once said that her aim was to "show Father Parliament that the women of his household should be expected to share the duties and responsibilities of government with their brothers."

At the time, being a woman in the Senate was rare. However, Fallis never thought of herself as discriminated against. She believed that "[women] stand on [their] merits" and that she had "never seen a particle of discrimination" during her years working in the Senate.

Although Fallis believed that it was up to both men and women to come together for the combined good of the country, she also pointed out that women were needed in public affairs and that it was their duty (not only as women but as citizens) to take a greater interest in politics. Fallis maintained that it was especially "very important that women realize they are not living in the same world their grandmothers lived in. Their vote is needed both in the international and national field."
