= Olive Lillian Irvine =

Canadian politician and teacher

The Honourable Olive Lillian Irvine

Canadian Senator from Manitoba
- In office January 14, 1960 – November 1, 1969
- Appointed by: John Diefenbaker

Personal details
- Born: Olive Lillian Mills; 21 June 1895 Holland, Manitoba, Canada
- Died: 1 November 1969 (aged 74) Ottawa, Ontario, Canada
- Party: Conservative

Olive Lillian Irvine (21 June 1895 – 1 November 1969) was a Canadian teacher and politician.

== Early life ==
Born in Holland, Manitoba, the daughter of R. J. Mills, Irvine attended public school in Portage la Prairie and at the Winnipeg Normal School. She then became a teacher in Winnipeg. She married James C. Irvine on 14 January 1920.

== Political career ==
She was President of the Women's Conservative Association of Manitoba. Irvine was appointed the representative from Manitoba on the National Capital Commission in 1959.

A Progressive Conservative, she was appointed to the Senate of Canada on 14 January 1960 on the recommendation of Prime Minister John Diefenbaker, and she represented the senatorial division of Lisgar, Manitoba until her death.

== Death ==
She died in Ottawa on 1 November 1969 and was buried in Winnipeg's Chapel Lawn Memorial Gardens.
