= Florence Elsie Inman =

Canadian politician (1891–1986)

The Honourable Elsie Inman

Senator from Prince Edward Island
- In office 28 July 1955 – 31 May 1986
- Appointed by: Louis St. Laurent

Personal details
- Born: Florence Elsie Macdonald; 5 December 1891 West River, Prince Edward Island
- Died: 31 May 1986 (aged 94) Ottawa, Ontario, Canada
- Party: Liberal
- Spouse(s): George Strong Inman (m. 26 September 1910, d. 1937)
- Children: 4 sons (William Robert, George Strong, Wilfred Nelson and Roland Victor)

Florence Elsie Inman (née Macdonald; 5 December 1891 – 31 May 1986) was a long–serving member of the Senate of Canada. A Liberal, she was appointed to the Senate 28 July 1955 on the recommendation of Louis St-Laurent, and represented the senatorial division of Murray Harbour, Prince Edward Island until her death. She was the first female Senator from Prince Edward Island.

== Early life ==
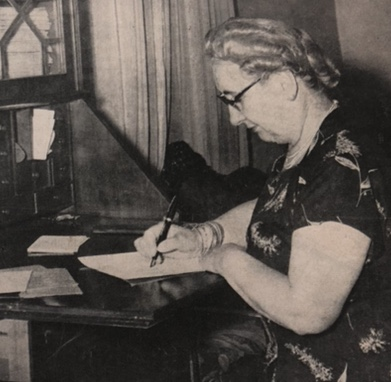
Inman writing her documents at her desk in the Poole House Inn.

Florence Elise Inman was born in West River, Prince Edward Island in Queen's County Her parents where Alexander Macdonald and his wife, Florence (née White). At an early age, she lived with her grandfather on his farm and later moved to the city of Charlottetown. In the later years, Inman owned an inn known as the Poole House Inn in Montague located in the eastern end of the island, populated at 1,200 people. She was also the Vice President of the Inn's Association, the only women to hold that position at the time. Inman was married at eighteen to Charlottetown lawyer George Strong Inman. He had many political aspirations that inspired her to follow in his direction of politics and she was a great aid to him in his campaigns. The two were married from 1910 and had four sons and eight grandchildren. Her four sons consisted of: Commander William Robert (W.R.) Inman located in Ottawa; Dr. George Strong Inman who practices medicine at Montague and on occasion, his children would help his mother at the Poole House Inn; Lt. Commander Wilfred Nelson (W.N.) Inman stationed at St. John's, Newfoundland; and Major Roland Victor (R.V.) Inman, who is on the joint staff in Washington. Elise was also interested Imperial Order Daughters of the Empire (IODE) and wanted to offer her aid in the Red Cross Movement. She is responsible for the Blood Donor Clinic set up in Summerside.

== Politics ==
Inman was very inspired by her husband's political achievements. She was an advocate for women's rights to vote and urged women across Prince Edward Island to do so. She also went before the Island Government, accompanied by Mrs. Cecil Stewart, to ask that all women be given the opportunity to vote. After her husband's death in 1937, she remained active in her political work. When the Canada Act 1982 was before the Senate, Inman was among 23 members of the upper house to oppose the patriation of the Constitution of Canada.

== Death ==
Inman died at Ottawa's National Defence Medical Centre on 31 May 1986 following a heart attack the previous month (29 April). At 95, she was the oldest serving senator at that time and continued to attend some Senate sessions until December 1985 despite having arthritis in her final years.
