= Muriel McQueen Fergusson =

Canadian politician (1899–1997)

The Honourable Muriel McQueen Fergusson PC OC QC
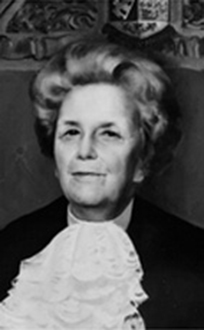

Speaker of the Senate of Canada
- In office 1972–1974
- Nominated by: Pierre Trudeau
- Appointed by: Roland Michener
- Preceded by: Jean-Paul Deschatelets
- Succeeded by: Renaude Lapointe

Senator for Fredericton, New Brunswick
- In office 1953–1975
- Appointed by: Louis St. Laurent

Personal details
- Born: May 26, 1899 Shediac, New Brunswick, Canada
- Died: April 11, 1997 (aged 97) Fredericton, New Brunswick, Canada
- Party: Liberal

Muriel McQueen Fergusson, PC OC QC (May 26, 1899 – April 11, 1997) was a Canadian activist, judge and politician. Fergusson served in the Senate of Canada and as the first woman Speaker of the Senate. She is known for a long career of advocating for the less privileged, most often women.

Born in Shediac, New Brunswick, she graduated from Mount Allison University in 1921 with a B.A. In 1926, she retired from only one year's practice at law in the office of her barrister father, James McQueen, to marry Aubrey S. Fergusson. She lived with her husband in Grand Falls, New Brunswick, for ten years, during which time she opened the Malabeam Tea Room, and organized community activities including founding the Grand Falls Literary Club. She was readmitted to the bar in 1936 to support her family after her husband became ill from earlier injuries acquired during service in the First World War; he died six years later. She gradually took over her husband's practice and soon after became New Brunswick's first female judge of a probate court. She also became clerk of the county court and the circuit court and the town solicitor for Grand Falls.

Fergusson fought for increased participation of women in politics. In 1946, she successfully petitioned for the right of all women in New Brunswick to vote in municipal elections. Soon after, she challenged the ban on women running for Fredericton City Council. Because no one stepped forward to take advantage, McQueen Fergusson ran for Alderman and won by acclamation in 1950 and 1951.

Fergusson also advocated for pay equity and protection of women's and children's rights. She spoke regularly at women's group events on topic of pay equity and wills. She fought to have a pay raise of $100 per year for all male city employees expanded to included female employees as well, up from the proposed $50 per year for females. With the support of letter-writing campaigns by various women's groups, she became the Director of Family Allowances, a position that had originally been restricted to males. Throughout her life, she volunteered with many organizations, including the Girl Guides of Canada and other charitable causes focused on girls and women.

She was the first woman elected, in 1950, to the Fredericton City Council as a city councilor and was the first woman deputy mayor in 1953.

She was appointed to the Senate of Canada in 1953 and was the first woman Speaker of the Senate from 1972 to 1974. She retired in 1975.

In 1974, she was sworn to the Privy Council. In 1976 she was made an Officer of the Order of Canada. In 1986 she was the recipient of the Governor General's Award in Commemoration of the Persons Case.

Honorary doctor of several Canadian universities; among others, she received an honorary degree from Mount Allison University in 1954. A charitable foundation and a family violence research centre are named in honour of Muriel McQueen Fergusson.
