= Mariana Beauchamp Jodoin =

Canadian politician (1881–1980)

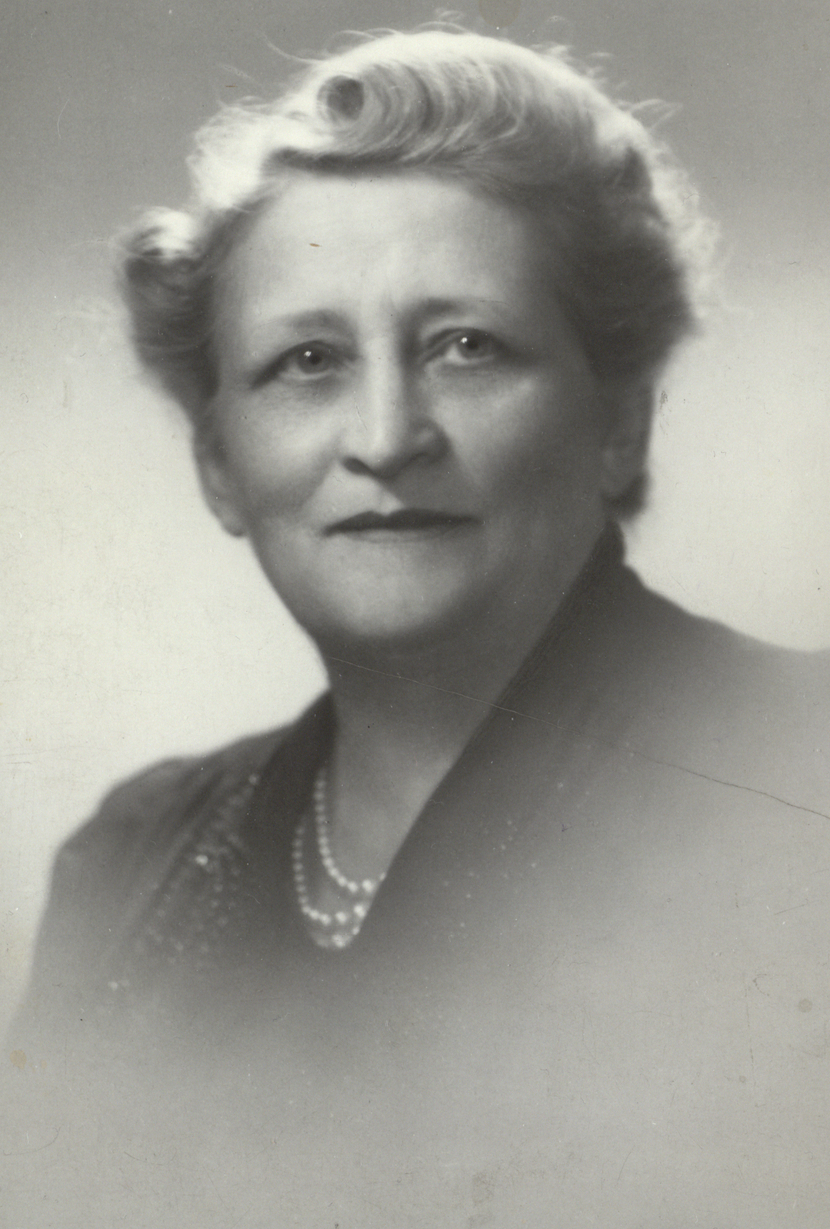

Senator for Saurel, Quebec
- In office 19 May 1953 – 1 June 1966
- Appointed by: Louis Stephen St. Laurent
- Preceded by: Athanase David
- Succeeded by: Alan Macnaughton

Personal details
- Born: Mariana Beauchamp Jodoin; 29 November 1881 Montreal, Quebec
- Died: 4 January 1980 (aged 98)
- Party: Liberal
- Spouse: Tancrède Jodoin

Mariana Beauchamp Jodoin (29 November 1881 – 4 January 1980) was a Liberal party member of the Senate of Canada. She was born in Montreal, Quebec.

The daughter of Jean-Joseph Beauchamp and Élisa Décary, she was educated at the Convent d'Hochelaga. In 1905, she married Tancrède Jodoin.

She was appointed to the Senate for the Saurel, Quebec division on 19 May 1953 following nomination by Prime Minister Louis St. Laurent. She remained in that role until her resignation on 1 June 1966.

Jodoin was the first francophone woman and the first woman from Quebec named to the Senate. After her death in 1980, she was entombed at the Notre Dame des Neiges Cemetery in Montreal.
