= Cairine Wilson =

Canadian politician and first female senator (1885–1962)

The Honourable Cairine Wilson
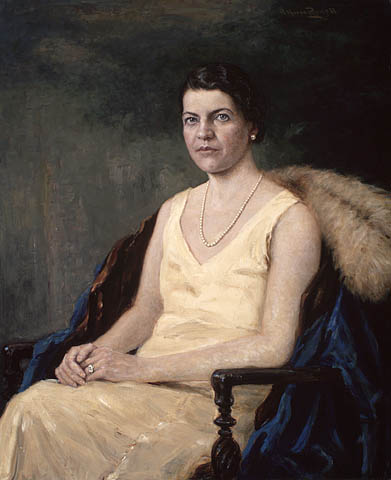

Canadian Senator from Ontario
- In office February 15, 1930 – March 3, 1962

Personal details
- Born: Cairine Reay Mackay; February 4, 1885 Montreal, Quebec, Canada
- Died: March 3, 1962 (aged 77) Ottawa, Ontario, Canada
- Party: Liberal
- Spouse: Norman Wilson (m. 1909; died 1956)
- Relations: Jane Mackay, mother, Robert Mackay, father

Cairine Reay Mackay Wilson (February 4, 1885 – March 3, 1962) was Canada's first woman to become a senator. She served as a Senator for Ontario from 1930 until her death in 1962.

== Personal life ==
Cairine Reay Mackay was born in Montreal on February 4, 1885. She was born into a family of Scottish-Canadians that were very wealthy and influential. She was a student at Trafalgar School for Girls. Cairine was the daughter of Jane and Robert Mackay, a Liberal Senator and personal friend of Sir Wilfrid Laurier. Cairine Wilson was introduced to her future husband by Laurier's wife, Zoé, at a 1905 state ball. In 1909, she married Norman Wilson, the Liberal Member of Parliament for Russell, who died on July 14, 1956, due to declining health for an extended period of time. Before his death, however, they moved to Cumberland, Ontario, and raised eight children together.

== Career ==
In 1918, Wilson and her family moved to Ottawa, where Cairine performed extensive volunteer work. This includes working with underprivileged children, refugees and the poor, as well as running political organizations that influence women and children to get involved in politics. She helped found the Twentieth Century Liberal Association and the National Federation of Liberal Women of Canada, of which she was president from 1938 to 1948.

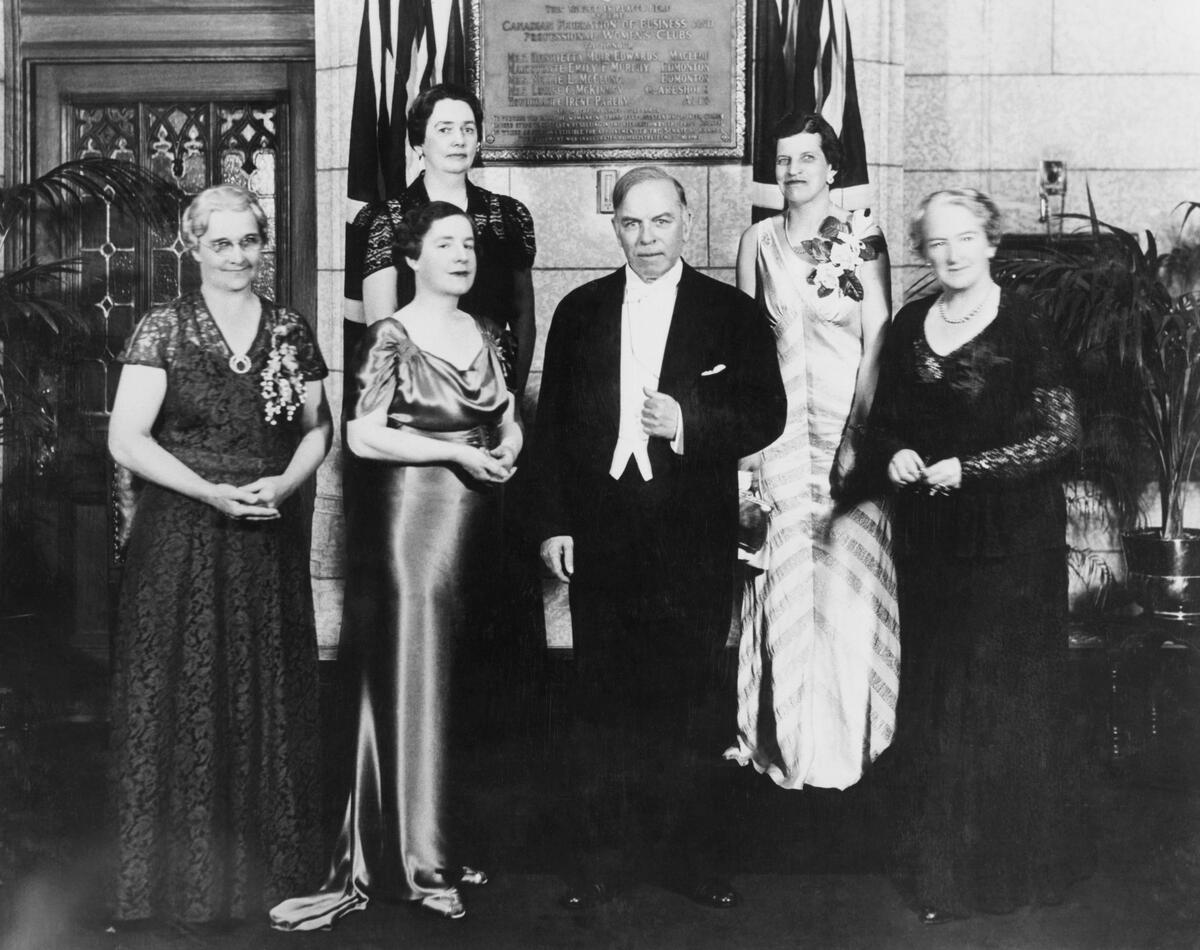
Rt. Hon. W. L. Mackenzie King unveiled a plaque to the Valiant 5 in the Person's Case

Wilson was appointed the first female senator of the country at the age of 45 in February 1930 by the government of Prime Minister William Lyon Mackenzie King; this was just four months after the Persons Case judgment was handed down by the Judicial Committee of the Privy Council. Previously, women had not been allowed to serve in the Senate, as tradition and lower courts had not considered women to be "qualified persons" as written in the British North America Acts, and were prohibited from being called to the Senate.

As president of the League of Nations Society of Canada in 1938, Senator Wilson spoke out against the Munich Agreement's appeasement of Hitler. During the Second World War, the government of William Lyon Mackenzie King was resistant to permitting Jewish refugees from Germany to settle in Canada, but she arranged the acceptance of 100 orphans.

In 1949, at the request of King's successor Louis St. Laurent, Wilson became Canada's first female delegate to the United Nations General Assembly. She was the chairman of the Canadian National Committee on Refugees and the first woman to chair Senate Standing Committee (Immigration and Labour). She was given the Cross of the Knight of the Legion of Honor by France in 1950 for her work with child refugees.

Wilson again made parliamentary history in 1955 when she became the first woman Deputy Speaker of the Canadian Senate.

== Achievements ==
Wilson was recognized for her continuous dedication to advocacy-related work. She served as the chairman of the Canadian-American Women’s Committee, president of the Princess Alice Foundation for the Training of Youth Leaders, vice-president of the Victorian Order of Nurses, Honorary president of the Ottawa Young Women’s Christian Association and the Save the Children Fund. In 1930, Wilson established the National Organization of Young Liberals, with the support of her friends and family. Wilson would send groups of youth across Canada on a periodic basis, in hopes of providing them with a better understanding of politics.

== Death ==
Cairine Wilson died suddenly of a heart attack at the age of 77 on Saturday, March 3, 1962. She spent three weeks at the Civic hospital in Ottawa with complications that were emerging from her hip fractures that she suffered from a year before her death. Wilson's funeral services took place on a Tuesday at the St. Andrew's Presbyterian Church in Ottawa.

Cairine Wilson Secondary School, a secondary school in Orleans, Ontario is named after her.

== Archives ==
There is a Cairine Reay Wilson fonds at Library and Archives Canada.
