= Lists of members of the Senate of Canada =

The following are lists of members of the Senate of Canada:

- List of current senators of Canada
- List of Senate of Canada appointments by prime minister

== Alphabetically ==
- A
- B
- C
- D
- E
- F
- G
- H
- I
- J
- K
- L
- M
- N
- O
- P
- Q
- R
- S
- T
- U
- V
- W
- X (Note: There have not yet been any senators whose surname begins with "X")
- Y
- Z

== By province ==
- British Columbia
- Alberta
- Saskatchewan
- Manitoba
- Ontario
- Quebec
- New Brunswick
- Prince Edward Island
- Nova Scotia
- Newfoundland and Labrador
- Territories

== By Parliament ==
- 1st Parliament of Canada
- 26th Parliament of Canada
- 27th Parliament of Canada
- 28th Parliament of Canada
- 29th Parliament of Canada
- 30th Parliament of Canada
- 31st Parliament of Canada
- 32nd Parliament of Canada
- 33rd Parliament of Canada
- 34th Parliament of Canada
- 35th Parliament of Canada
- 36th Parliament of Canada
- 37th Parliament of Canada
- 38th Parliament of Canada
- 39th Parliament of Canada
- 40th Parliament of Canada
- 41st Parliament of Canada
- 42nd Parliament of Canada
- 43rd Parliament of Canada
- 44th Parliament of Canada
- 45th Parliament of Canada

== Senate-related offices ==
- List of speakers of the Senate
- List of leaders of the government in the Senate (Canada)
- List of representatives of the Government in the Senate (Canada)
- List of leaders of the opposition in the Senate of Canada
