= List of senators in the 38th Parliament of Canada =

This is a list of members of the Senate of Canada in the 38th Parliament of Canada.

The province of Quebec has 24 Senate divisions which are constitutionally mandated. In all other provinces, a Senate division is strictly an optional designation of the senator's own choosing, and has no real constitutional or legal standing. A senator who does not choose a special senate division is designated a senator for the province at large.

Names in bold indicate senators in the 27th Canadian Ministry.

== List of senators ==
=== Senators at the beginning of the 38th Parliament ===
Name	Party	Province (Division)	Date appointed	Appointed by	Left office	Reason
Willie Adams	Liberal	Nunavut	April 5, 1977	Trudeau	June 22, 2009	Retirement
Raynell Andreychuk	Conservative	Saskatchewan	March 11, 1993	Mulroney	August 14, 2019	Retirement
W. David Angus	Conservative	Quebec	June 10, 1993	Mulroney	July 21, 2012	Retirement
Norman Atkins	Progressive Conservative	Ontario	June 30, 1986	Mulroney	June 27, 2009	Retirement
**Jack Austin**	**Liberal**	**British Columbia**	**August 19, 1975**	**Trudeau**	**March 2, 2007**	**Retirement**
Lise Bacon	Liberal	Quebec	September 15, 1994	Chrétien	August 25, 2009	Retirement
George Baker	Liberal	Newfoundland and Labrador	March 26, 2002	Chrétien	September 4, 2017	Retirement
Tommy Banks	Liberal	Alberta	April 7, 2000	Chrétien	December 17, 2011	Retirement
Michel Biron	Liberal	Quebec	October 4, 2001	Chrétien	March 16, 2009	Retirement
John G. Bryden	Liberal	New Brunswick	November 23, 1994	Chrétien	October 31, 2009	Resignation
John Buchanan	Conservative	Nova Scotia	September 12, 1990	Mulroney	April 22, 2006	Retirement
Catherine Callbeck	Liberal	Prince Edward Island	September 22, 1997	Chrétien	July 25, 2014	Retirement
Pat Carney	Conservative	British Columbia	August 30, 1990	Mulroney	January 31, 2008	Resignation
Sharon Carstairs	Liberal	Manitoba	September 15, 1994	Chrétien	October 17, 2011	Resignation
Maria Chaput	Liberal	Manitoba	December 12, 2002	Chrétien	March 1, 2016	Resignation
Ione Christensen	Liberal	Yukon	September 2, 1999	Chrétien	December 31, 2006	Resignation
Ethel Cochrane	Conservative	Newfoundland and Labrador	November 17, 1986	Mulroney	September 23, 2012	Retirement
Gerald Comeau	Conservative	Nova Scotia	August 30, 1990	Mulroney	November 30, 2013	Resignation
Joan Cook	Liberal	Newfoundland and Labrador	March 6, 1998	Chrétien	October 6, 2009	Retirement
Anne Cools	Conservative	Ontario	January 13, 1984	Trudeau	August 12, 2018	Retirement
Eymard Corbin	Liberal	New Brunswick	July 9, 1984	Turner	August 2, 2009	Retirement
Jane Cordy	Liberal	Nova Scotia	June 9, 2000	Chrétien	Incumbent	
Joseph A. Day	Liberal	New Brunswick	October 4, 2001	Chrétien	Incumbent	
Pierre de Bané	Liberal	Quebec	June 29, 1984	Trudeau	August 2, 2013	Retirement
Consiglio Di Nino	Conservative	Ontario	August 30, 1990	Mulroney	June 30, 2012	Resignation
C. William Doody	Progressive Conservative	Newfoundland and Labrador	October 3, 1979	Clark	December 27, 2005	Death
Percy Downe	Liberal	Prince Edward Island	June 26, 2003	Chrétien	Incumbent	
Trevor Eyton	Conservative	Ontario	September 23, 1990	Mulroney	July 12, 2009	Retirement
Joyce Fairbairn	Liberal	Alberta	June 29, 1984	Trudeau	January 18, 2013	Resignation
Marisa Ferretti Barth	Liberal	Quebec	September 22, 1997	Chrétien	April 28, 2006	Retirement
Isobel Finnerty	Liberal	Ontario	September 2, 1999	Chrétien	July 15, 2005	Retirement
Ross Fitzpatrick	Liberal	British Columbia	March 6, 1998	Chrétien	February 4, 2008	Retirement
Michael Forrestall	Conservative	Nova Scotia	September 27, 1990	Mulroney	June 8, 2006	Death
Joan Fraser	Liberal	Quebec	September 17, 1998	Chrétien	February 2, 2018	Resignation
George Furey	Liberal	Newfoundland and Labrador	August 11, 1999	Chrétien	May 12, 2023	Retirement
Jean-Robert Gauthier	Liberal	Ontario	November 23, 1994	Chrétien	October 22, 2004	Retirement
Aurélien Gill	Liberal	Quebec	September 17, 1998	Chrétien	August 26, 2008	Retirement
Jerry Grafstein	Liberal	Ontario	January 13, 1984	Trudeau	January 2, 2010	Retirement
Lenard Gustafson	Conservative	Saskatchewan	May 26, 1993	Mulroney	November 10, 2008	Retirement
Mac Harb	Liberal	Ontario	September 9, 2003	Chrétien	August 26, 2013	Resignation
Dan Hays	Liberal	Alberta	June 29, 1984	Trudeau	June 30, 2007	Resignation
Céline Hervieux-Payette	Liberal	Quebec	March 21, 1995	Chrétien	April 22, 2016	Retirement
Libbe Hubley	Liberal	Prince Edward Island	March 8, 2001	Chrétien	September 8, 2017	Retirement
Mobina Jaffer	Liberal	British Columbia	June 13, 2001	Chrétien	Incumbent	
Janis Johnson	Conservative	Manitoba	September 27, 1990	Mulroney	September 27, 2016	Resignation
Serge Joyal	Liberal	Quebec	November 26, 1997	Chrétien	Incumbent	
James Kelleher	Conservative	Ontario	September 23, 1990	Mulroney	October 2, 2005	Retirement
Colin Kenny	Liberal	Ontario	June 29, 1984	Trudeau	February 2, 2018	Resignation
Wilbert Keon	Conservative	Ontario	September 27, 1990	Mulroney	May 17, 2010	Retirement
Noël Kinsella	Conservative	New Brunswick	September 12, 1990	Mulroney	November 27, 2014	Retirement
Michael J. L. Kirby	Liberal	Nova Scotia	January 13, 1984	Trudeau	October 31, 2006	Resignation
Richard Kroft	Liberal	Manitoba	June 11, 1998	Chrétien	September 24, 2004	Resignation
Laurier LaPierre	Liberal	Ontario	June 13, 2001	Chrétien	November 21, 2004	Retirement
Jean Lapointe	Liberal	Quebec	June 13, 2001	Chrétien	December 6, 2010	Retirement
Raymond Lavigne	Liberal	Quebec	March 26, 2002	Chrétien	March 21, 2011	Resignation
Edward M. Lawson	Liberal	British Columbia	October 7, 1970	Trudeau	September 24, 2004	Retirement
Marjory LeBreton	Conservative	Ontario	June 18, 1993	Mulroney	July 4, 2015	Retirement
Viola Léger	Liberal	New Brunswick	June 13, 2001	Chrétien	June 29, 2005	Retirement
Rose-Marie Losier-Cool	Liberal	New Brunswick	March 21, 1995	Chrétien	June 18, 2012	Retirement
John Lynch-Staunton	Conservative	Quebec	September 23, 1990	Mulroney	June 19, 2005	Retirement
Shirley Maheu	Liberal	Quebec	February 1, 1996	Chrétien	February 1, 2006	Death
Frank Mahovlich	Liberal	Ontario	June 11, 1998	Chrétien	January 10, 2013	Retirement
Paul Massicotte	Liberal	Quebec	June 26, 2003	Chrétien	Incumbent	
Michael Meighen	Conservative	Ontario	September 27, 1990	Mulroney	February 6, 2012	Resignation
Terry Mercer	Liberal	Nova Scotia	November 7, 2003	Chrétien	Incumbent	
Pana Merchant	Liberal	Saskatchewan	December 12, 2002	Chrétien	March 31, 2017	Resignation
Lorna Milne	Liberal	Ontario	September 21, 1995	Chrétien	December 13, 2009	Retirement
Wilfred Moore	Liberal	Nova Scotia	September 26, 1996	Chrétien	January 14, 2017	Retirement
Yves Morin	Liberal	Quebec	March 8, 2001	Chrétien	November 28, 2004	Retirement
Jim Munson	Liberal	Ontario	December 10, 2003	Chrétien	Incumbent	
Lowell Murray	Progressive Conservative	Ontario	September 13, 1979	Clark	September 26, 2011	Retirement
Pierre Claude Nolin	Conservative	Quebec	June 18, 1993	Mulroney	April 23, 2015	Death
Donald Oliver	Conservative	Nova Scotia	September 7, 1990	Mulroney	November 16, 2013	Retirement
Landon Pearson	Liberal	Ontario	September 15, 1994	Chrétien	November 16, 2005	Retirement
Lucie Pépin	Liberal	Quebec	April 8, 1997	Chrétien	September 7, 2011	Retirement
Gerard Phalen	Liberal	Nova Scotia	October 4, 2001	Chrétien	March 28, 2009	Retirement
Michael Pitfield	Independent	Ontario	December 22, 1982	Trudeau	June 1, 2010	Resignation
Madeleine Plamondon	Independent	Quebec	September 9, 2003	Chrétien	September 21, 2006	Retirement
Marie Poulin	Liberal	Ontario	September 21, 1995	Chrétien	April 17, 2015	Resignation
Vivienne Poy	Liberal	Ontario	September 17, 1998	Chrétien	September 17, 2012	Resignation
Marcel Prud'homme	Independent	Quebec	May 26, 1993	Mulroney	November 30, 2009	Retirement
Pierrette Ringuette	Liberal	New Brunswick	December 12, 2002	Chrétien	Incumbent	
Jean-Claude Rivest	Independent	Quebec	March 11, 1993	Mulroney	January 31, 2015	Resignation
Fernand Robichaud	Liberal	New Brunswick	September 22, 1997	Chrétien	December 2, 2014	Retirement
Bill Rompkey	Liberal	Newfoundland and Labrador	September 21, 1995	Chrétien	May 13, 2011	Retirement
Eileen Rossiter	Conservative	Prince Edward Island	November 17, 1986	Mulroney	July 14, 2004	Retirement
Nick Sibbeston	Liberal	Northwest Territories	September 2, 1999	Chrétien	November 21, 2017	Resignation
David Smith	Liberal	Ontario	June 25, 2002	Chrétien	May 16, 2016	Retirement
Herbert O. Sparrow	Liberal	Saskatchewan	February 9, 1968	Pearson	January 4, 2005	Retirement
Mira Spivak	Independent	Manitoba	November 17, 1986	Mulroney	July 12, 2009	Retirement
Gerry St. Germain	Conservative	British Columbia	June 23, 1993	Mulroney	November 6, 2012	Retirement
Peter Stollery	Liberal	Ontario	July 2, 1981	Trudeau	November 29, 2010	Retirement
Terry Stratton	Conservative	Manitoba	March 25, 1993	Mulroney	March 16, 2013	Retirement
David Tkachuk	Conservative	Saskatchewan	June 8, 1993	Mulroney	Incumbent	
Marilyn Trenholme Counsell	Liberal	New Brunswick	September 9, 2003	Chrétien	October 22, 2008	Retirement
Charlie Watt	Liberal	Quebec	January 16, 1984	Trudeau	March 16, 2018	Resignation

=== Senators appointed during the 38th Parliament ===
Name	Party	Province (Division)	Date appointed	Appointed by	Left office	Reason
Robert Peterson	Liberal	Saskatchewan	March 24, 2005	Martin	October 19, 2012	Retirement
Jim Cowan	Liberal	Nova Scotia	March 24, 2005	Martin	January 22, 2017	Retirement
Nancy Ruth	Progressive Conservative	Ontario	March 24, 2005	Martin	January 6, 2017	Retirement
Lillian Dyck	New Democrat	Saskatchewan	March 24, 2005	Martin	August 24, 2020	Retirement
Art Eggleton	Liberal	Ontario	March 24, 2005	Martin	September 29, 2018	Retirement
Grant Mitchell	Liberal	Alberta	March 24, 2005	Martin	Incumbent	
Claudette Tardif	Liberal	Alberta	March 24, 2005	Martin	February 2, 2018	Resignation
Elaine McCoy	Progressive Conservative	Alberta	March 24, 2005	Martin	December 29, 2020	Death
Roméo Dallaire	Liberal	Quebec	March 24, 2005	Martin	June 17, 2014	Resignation
Rod Zimmer	Liberal	Manitoba	August 2, 2005	Martin	August 2, 2013	Resignation
Larry Campbell	Liberal	British Columbia	August 2, 2005	Martin	Incumbent	
Hugh Segal	Conservative	Ontario	August 2, 2005	Martin	June 15, 2014	Resignation
Andrée Champagne	Conservative	Quebec	August 2, 2005	Martin	July 17, 2014	Retirement
Dennis Dawson	Liberal	Quebec	August 2, 2005	Martin	Incumbent	
Francis Fox	Liberal	Quebec	August 29, 2005	Martin	December 2, 2011	Resignation
Yoine Goldstein	Liberal	Quebec	August 29, 2005	Martin	May 11, 2009	Retirement
Sandra Lovelace Nicholas	Liberal	New Brunswick	September 21, 2005	Martin	Incumbent	

=== Left Senate during the 38th Parliament ===
Date	Name	Party	Representing	Details
July 14, 2004	Eileen Rossiter	Conservative	Prince Edward Island	Retirement
September 24, 2004	Edward M. Lawson	Liberal	British Columbia	Retirement
September 24, 2004	Richard Kroft	Liberal	Manitoba	Resignation
October 22, 2004	Jean-Robert Gauthier	Liberal	Ontario	Retirement
November 21, 2004	Laurier LaPierre	Liberal	Ontario	Retirement
November 28, 2004	Yves Morin	Liberal	Quebec	Retirement
January 4, 2005	Herbert O. Sparrow	Liberal	Saskatchewan	Retirement
June 19, 2005	John Lynch-Staunton	Conservative	Quebec	Retirement
June 29, 2005	Viola Léger	Liberal	New Brunswick	Retirement
July 15, 2005	Isobel Finnerty	Liberal	Ontario	Retirement
October 2, 2005	James Kelleher	Conservative	Ontario	Retirement
November 16, 2005	Landon Pearson	Liberal	Ontario	Retirement
December 27, 2005	C. William Doody	Progressive Conservative	Newfoundland and Labrador	Death

=== Changes in party affiliation during the 38th Parliament ===
There were no changes in party affiliation during the 38th Parliament.

== See also ==
- List of House members of the 38th Parliament of Canada
- List of current Canadian senators
