= List of members of the Senate of Canada (F) =

Senator	Lifespan	Party	Prov.	Entered	Left	Appointed by	Left due to	For life?
Hector Fabre	1834–1910	N	QC	5 February 1875	12 July 1882	Mackenzie	Resignation	Y
Joseph-Fernand Fafard	1882–1955	L	QC	29 January 1940	14 May 1955	King	Death	Y
Joyce Fairbairn	1939–2022	L	AB	29 June 1984	18 January 2013	Trudeau, P.	Resignation	
Iva Campbell Fallis	1883–1956	C	ON	20 July 1935	7 March 1956	Bennett	Death	Y
Thomas Farquhar	1875–1962	L	ON	10 September 1948	27 September 1962	King	Resignation	Y
Edward Matthew Farrell	1854–1931	L	NS	12 January 1910	6 August 1931	Laurier	Death	Y
John Wallace de Beque Farris	1878–1970	L	BC	9 January 1937	25 February 1970	King	Death	Y
Guillaume-André Fauteux	1874–1940	C	QC	30 December 1933	10 September 1940	Bennett	Death	Y
Donald Ferguson	1839–1909	C	PE	4 September 1893	3 September 1909	Thompson	Death	Y
John Ferguson	1813–1888	C	NB	23 October 1867	21 August 1888	Royal proclamation	Death	Y
John Ferguson	1839–1896	C	ON	1 October 1892	22 September 1896	Abbott	Death	Y
Muriel McQueen Fergusson	1899–1997	L	NB	19 May 1953	23 May 1975	St. Laurent	Voluntary retirement	Y
Charles-Édouard Ferland	1892–1974	L	QC	18 April 1945	18 April 1951	King	Resignation	Y
Marisa Ferretti Barth	1931–2021	L	QC	23 September 1997	28 April 2006	Chrétien	Retirement	
James Ferrier	1800–1888	C	QC	23 October 1867	30 May 1888	Royal proclamation	Death	Y
Sheila Finestone	1927–2009	L	QC	11 August 1999	8 January 2002	Chrétien	Retirement	
Doug Finley	1946–2013	C	ON	27 August 2009	11 May 2013	Harper	Death	
Isobel Finnerty	1930–2016	L	ON	2 September 1999	15 July 2005	Chrétien	Retirement	
Jean-Baptiste Romuald Fiset	1843–1917	L	QC	20 October 1897	5 January 1917	Laurier	Death	Y
John Henry Fisher	1855–1933	C	ON	26 July 1917	1 December 1933	Borden	Death	Y
Ross Fitzpatrick	1933–present	L	BC	6 March 1998	4 February 2008	Chrétien	Retirement	
Billa Flint	1805–1894	L	ON	23 October 1867	14 June 1894	Royal proclamation	Death	Y
Jacques Flynn	1915–2000	PC	QC	9 November 1962	22 August 1990	Diefenbaker	Voluntary retirement	Y
Gordon Fogo	1896–1952	L	ON	25 January 1949	6 July 1952	St. Laurent	Death	Y
Éric Forest	1952–present	NA	QC	21 November 2016	—	Trudeau, J.	—	
Jean Forest	1926–2024	L	AB	16 May 1996	28 August 1998	Chrétien	Resignation	
Josée Forest-Niesing	1964–2021		ON	11 October 2018	20 November 2021	Trudeau, J.	Death	
Amédée E. Forget	1847–1923	L	AB	2 May 1911	8 June 1923	Laurier	Death	Y
Louis-Joseph Forget	1853–1911	C	QC	15 June 1896	7 April 1911	Tupper	Death	Y
Robert Forke	1860–1934	LP	MB	30 December 1929	2 February 1934	King	Death	Y
Michael Forrestall	1932–2006	PC	NS	27 September 1990	10 June 2006	Mulroney	Death	
Eugene Forsey	1904–1991	L	ON	7 October 1970	29 May 1979	Trudeau, P.	Retirement	
Michael Fortier	1962–present	C	QC	27 February 2006	8 September 2008	Harper	Resignation	
Émile Fortin	1878–1936	C	QC	14 August 1935	18 May 1936	Bennett	Death	Y
Pierre-Étienne Fortin	1823–1888	C	QC	13 May 1887	15 June 1888	Macdonald	Death	Y
Asa Belknap Foster	1817–1877	C	QC	23 October 1867	1 January 1874	Royal proclamation	Resignation	Y
George Eulas Foster	1847–1931	C	ON	22 September 1921	30 December 1931	Meighen	Death	Y
George Green Foster	1860–1931	C	QC	27 July 1917	1 May 1931	Borden	Death	Y
Walter Edward Foster	1873–1947	L	NB	6 December 1928	14 November 1947	King	Death	Y
Edgar Fournier	1908–1994	PC	NB	24 September 1962	11 February 1983	Diefenbaker	Resignation	Y
J. Michel Fournier	1905–1992	L	NB	9 December 1971	29 September 1980	Trudeau, P.	Retirement	
Sarto Fournier	1903–1980	L	QC	12 June 1953	23 July 1980	St. Laurent	Death	Y
George William Fowler	1859–1924	C	NB	29 June 1917	2 September 1924	Borden	Death	Y
Francis Fox	1939–2024	L	QC	29 August 2005	2 December 2011	Martin	Resignation	
Brian Francis	1957–present		PE	11 October 2018	—	Trudeau, J.	—	
Joan Fraser	1944–present	L	QC	17 September 1998	2 February 2018	Chrétien	Resignation	
William Alexander Fraser	1886–1962	L	ON	25 June 1949	26 October 1962	St. Laurent	Death	Y
Daryl Fridhandler	1900s–present		AB	31 August 2024	—	Trudeau, J.	—	
Alfred Ernest Fripp	1866–1938	C	ON	30 December 1933	25 March 1938	Bennett	Death	Y
Royce Frith	1923–2005	L	ON	5 April 1977	29 August 1994	Trudeau, P.	Resignation	
Francis Theodore Frost	1843–1916	L	ON	12 March 1903	25 August 1916	Laurier	Death	Y
Linda Frum	1963–present	C	ON	27 August 2009	27 August 2021	Harper	Resignation	
George Taylor Fulford	1852–1905	L	ON	29 January 1900	15 October 1905	Laurier	Death	Y
George Furey	1948–present	L→IL→NA	NL	11 August 1999	12 May 2023	Chrétien	Retirement	
