= List of members of the Senate of Canada (P) =

Senator	Lifespan	Party	Prov.	Entered	Left	Appointed by	Left due to	For life?
Charles-Eugène Panet	1829–1898	L	QC	27 March 1874	February 1875	Mackenzie	Resignation	Y
Louis Panet	1794–1884	C	QC	10 February 1871	26 March 1874	Macdonald	Resignation	Y
Anselme-Homère Pâquet	1830–1891	L	QC	9 February 1875	22 December 1891	Mackenzie	Death	Y
Eugène Paquet	1867–1951	C	QC	14 August 1935	8 May 1951	Bennett	Death	Y
Joseph Arthur Paquet	1857–1901	L	QC	27 June 1898	29 March 1901	Laurier	Death	Y
Philippe-Jacques Paradis	1868–1933	L	QC	14 December 1927	20 June 1933	King	Death	Y
Frederick Forsyth Pardee	1866–1927	L	ON	11 March 1922	4 February 1927	King	Death	Y
Georges Parent	1879–1942	L	QC	3 June 1930	14 December 1942	King	Death	Y
Kim Pate	1959–present	NA	ON	10 November 2016	—	Trudeau, J.	—	
Norman McLeod Paterson	1883–1983	L	ON	9 February 1940	18 June 1981	King	Voluntary retirement	Y
Dennis Patterson	1948–present	C	NU	27 August 2009	29 December 2023	Harper	Retirement	
Rebecca Patterson	1965–present		ON	21 November 2022	—	Trudeau, J.	—	
Arthur Maurice Pearson	1890–1976	PC	SK	12 October 1957	31 March 1971	Diefenbaker	Voluntary retirement	Y
Landon Pearson	1930–2023	L	ON	15 September 1994	16 November 2005	Chrétien	Retirement	
Chales Pelletier	1837–1911	L	QC	2 February 1877	1 September 1904	Mackenzie	Resignation	Y
Edward Goff Penny	1820–1881	L	QC	13 March 1874	11 October 1881	Mackenzie	Death	Y
George Penny	1897–1949	L	NL	17 August 1949	4 December 1949	St. Laurent	Death	Y
Lucie Pépin	1936–present	L	QC	8 April 1997	7 September 2011	Chrétien	Retirement	
William Dell Perley	1838–1909	C	NT	3 August 1888	15 July 1909	Macdonald	Death	Y
Ray Perrault	1926–2008	L	BC	5 October 1973	6 February 2001	Trudeau, P.	Retirement	
Ebenezer Perry	1788–1876	C	ON	2 February 1871	1 May 1876	Macdonald	Death	Y
Melvin Perry	1925–2002	L	PE	11 August 1999	23 August 2000	Chrétien	Retirement	
Robert Peterson	1937–2020	L	SK	24 March 2005	19 October 2012	Martin	Retirement	
Chantal Petitclerc	1969–present	NA	QC	1 April 2016	—	Trudeau, J.	—	
Iris Petten	1959–present		NL	3 May 2023	—	Trudeau, J.	—	
Ray Petten	1897–1961	L	NL	17 August 1949	16 February 1961	St. Laurent	Death	Y
William Petten	1923–1999	L	NL	8 April 1968	28 January 1998	Pearson	Retirement	
Gerard Phalen	1934–2021	L	NS	4 October 2001	28 March 2009	Chrétien	Retirement	
Lazarus Phillips	1895–1986	L	QC	9 February 1968	10 October 1970	Pearson	Retirement	
Orville Howard Phillips	1924–2009	PC	PE	5 February 1963	24 March 1999	Diefenbaker	Voluntary retirement	Y
Frederick William Pirie	1893–1956	L	NB	19 April 1945	3 October 1956	King	Death	Y
Michael Pitfield	1937–2017	I	ON	22 December 1982	1 June 2010	Trudeau, P.	Resignation	
Tom Pitfield	?–present		QC	7 July 2026	—	Carney	—	
Madeleine Plamondon	1931–present	I	QC	9 September 2003	21 September 2006	Chrétien	Retirement	
Albert Planta	1868–1952	C	BC	26 June 1917	1 December 1935	Borden	Resignation	Y
Don Plett	1950–present	C	MB	27 August 2009	14 May 2025	Harper	—	Y
Josiah Burr Plumb	1816–1888	C	ON	8 February 1883	12 March 1888	Macdonald	Death	Y
Pascal Poirier	1852–1933	LC	NB	9 March 1885	25 September 1933	Macdonald	Death	Y
Rose-May Poirier	1954–present	C	NB	28 February 2010	—	Harper	—	
Jean-Marie Poitras	1918–2009	PC	QC	26 September 1988	25 May 1993	Mulroney	Resignation	
Rufus Henry Pope	1857–1944	C	QC	14 November 1911	16 May 1944	Borden	Death	Y
Jean-François Pouliot	1890–1969	L	QC	28 July 1955	28 June 1968	St. Laurent	Resignation	Y
Charles Gavan Power	1888–1968	L	QC	28 July 1955	30 May 1968	St. Laurent	Death	Y
Lawrence Geoffrey Power	1841–1921	L	NS	2 February 1877	12 September 1921	Mackenzie	Death	Y
Vivienne Poy	1941–present	L	ON	17 September 1998	17 September 2012	Chrétien	Resignation	
Christian Pozer	1835–1884	N	QC	20 September 1876	18 July 1884	Mackenzie	Death	Y
Calvert Pratt	1888–1963	L	NL	24 January 1951	13 November 1963	St. Laurent	Death	Y
André Pratte	1957–present	NA	QC	1 April 2016	21 October 2019	Trudeau, J.	Resignation	
Jules-Édouard Prévost	1871–1943	L	QC	3 June 1930	13 October 1943	King	Death	Y
David Edward Price	1826–1883	C	QC	23 October 1867	22 August 1883	Royal proclamation	Death	Y
Evan John Price	1840–1899	C	QC	1 December 1888	30 August 1899	Macdonald	Death	Y
Clarence Primrose	1830–1902	LC	NS	28 November 1892	2 December 1902	Abbott	Death	Y
Joseph Benjamin Prince	1855–1920	L	SK	29 July 1909	26 October 1920	Laurier	Death	Y
Clive Pringle	1871–1920	C	ON	8 January 1917	2 May 1920	Borden	Death	Y
Paul Prosper	1965–present		NS	6 July 2023	—	Trudeau, J.	—	
William Proudfoot	1859–1922	LU	ON	6 November 1919	3 December 1922	Borden	Death	Y
Benjamin Charles Prowse	1862–1930	L	PE	5 May 1911	22 February 1930	Laurier	Death	Y
James Harper Prowse	1913–1976	L	AB	24 February 1966	27 September 1976	Pearson	Death	
Samuel Prowse	1835–1902	L-C	PE	14 September 1889	14 January 1902	Macdonald	Death	Y
Marcel Prud'homme	1934–2017	I	QC	26 May 1993	30 November 2009	Mulroney	Retirement	
Sandra Pupatello	1962–present		ON	7 March 2025	—	Trudeau, J.	—	
