= List of Manitoba senators =

This is a list of past and present members of the Senate of Canada representing the province of Manitoba.

Manitoba can be represented by up to six senators, but this was not always the case. Stipulated in the Manitoba Act, 1870, the province was first represented by two senators, then to increase incrementally based on population, when the population reached 75,000 it would then be represented by a maximum of four senators. The Constitution Act, 1915 added two more senate seats for Manitoba, bringing the total to six.

The Constitution Act, 1915 also amended section 26 of the Constitution Act, 1867 to add a fourth regional division, called the Western provinces, made up of British Columbia, Alberta, Saskatchewan and Manitoba, to allow two senators to be appointed on a regional basis.

== Current senators ==
Name	Party^{1}	Division^{2}	Date appointed	Appointed by^{3}	On the advice of	Mandatory retirement
Charles Adler	Non-affiliated	Manitoba	August 17, 2024	Simon	J. Trudeau	August 25, 2029
Raymonde Gagné	Non-affiliated	Manitoba	April 1, 2016	Johnston	J. Trudeau	January 7, 2031
Mary Jane McCallum	Conservative	Manitoba	December 4, 2017	Payette	J. Trudeau	May 1, 2027
Marilou McPhedran	Non-affiliated	Manitoba	November 10, 2016	Johnston	J. Trudeau	July 22, 2026
Gigi Osler	Canadian Senators Group	Manitoba	September 26, 2022	Simon	J. Trudeau	September 9, 2043
Don Plett	Conservative	Landmark	August 27, 2009	Jean	S. Harper	May 14, 2025
Geeta Tucker	Non-affiliated	Manitoba	July 9, 2026	Arbour	Carney	May 2, 2046

Notes:

^{1} Party listed is the senator's current party.
^{2} Senators are appointed to represent Manitoba. Each senator may choose to designate a geographic area within Manitoba as their division.
^{3} Senators are appointed by the governor general on the recommendation of the prime minister.

== Historical ==
Name	Party ^{1}	Division^{2}	Date appointed	Appointed by^{3}	End of term
Arthur-Lucien Beaubien	Liberal	Provencher	January 29, 1940	King	February 1, 1969
Aimé Bénard	Conservative	St. Boniface	September 3, 1917	Borden	January 8, 1938
Thomas-Alfred Bernier	Conservative	St. Boniface	October 27, 1892	Abbott	December 30, 1908
JoAnne Buth	Conservative	Manitoba	January 6, 2012	Harper	August 10, 2014
Charles Arkoll Boulton	Liberal-Conservative	Marquette	December 10, 1889	Macdonald	May 15, 1899
Patricia Bovey	Progressive Senate Group	Manitoba	November 10, 2016	J. Trudeau	May 15, 2023
George Bradbury	Conservative	Selkirk	December 17, 1917	Borden	September 6, 1925
Sharon Carstairs	Liberal	Manitoba	September 15, 1994	Chrétien	October 17, 2011
Maria Chaput	Liberal	Manitoba	December 12, 2002	Chrétien	March 1, 2016
Noé Chevrier	Liberal	Winnipeg	January 18, 1909	Laurier	October 9, 1911
Thomas Crerar	Liberal	Churchill	April 18, 1945	King	May 31, 1966
John Caswell Davis	Liberal	Winnipeg	January 25, 1949	St. Laurent	October 25, 1953
Ron Duhamel	Liberal	Manitoba	January 15, 2002	Chrétien	September 30, 2002
Douglas Everett	Independent Liberal	Fort Rouge	November 8, 1966	Pearson	January 20, 1994
Robert Forke	Liberal-Progressive	Brandon	December 30, 1929	King	February 2, 1934
Marc-Amable Girard	Liberal	St. Boniface	December 13, 1871	Macdonald	September 12, 1892
Joseph-Philippe Guay	Liberal	St. Boniface	March 23, 1978	Trudeau, P. E.	October 4, 1990
James Campbell Haig	Progressive Conservative	River Heights	June 15, 1962	Diefenbaker	December 29, 1977
John Thomas Haig	Progressive Conservative	Winnipeg	August 14, 1935	Richard Bennett	January 17, 1962
John Power Howden	Liberal	St. Boniface	April 18, 1945	King	November 4, 1959
Olive Lillian Irvine	Progressive Conservative	Lisgar	January 14, 1960	Diefenbaker	November 1, 1969
Duncan Jessiman	Progressive Conservative	Manitoba	May 26, 1993	Mulroney	June 5, 1998
Janis Johnson^{4}	Conservative	Winnipeg-Interlake; Manitoba^{5}	September 27, 1990	Mulroney	September 27, 2016
John Nesbitt Kirchhoffer	Conservative	Selkirk	December 16, 1892	Thompson	December 22, 1914
Richard Kroft	Liberal	Manitoba	June 11, 1998	Chrétien	September 24, 2004
Alphonse Larivière	Conservative	Provencher	October 23, 1911	Borden	September 1, 1917
Lendrum McMeans	Conservative	Winnipeg	July 26, 1917	Borden	September 13, 1941
William Craig McNamara	Liberal	Winnipeg	October 7, 1970	Trudeau, P. E.	August 8, 1979
Gildas Molgat	Liberal	St. Rose	October 7, 1970	Trudeau, P. E.	February 28, 2001
John Patrick Molloy	Liberal	Provencher	October 6, 1925	King	March 16, 1948
Henry Mullins	Conservative	Marquette	August 14, 1935	Bennett	September 5, 1950
Nathan Nurgitz	Progressive Conservative	Winnipeg North	October 3, 1979	Clark	February 9, 1993
Dufferin Roblin	Progressive Conservative	Red River	March 23, 1978	Trudeau, P. E.	June 17, 1992
Frederick Laurence Schaffner	Conservative	Souris	October 23, 1917	Borden	May 22, 1935
John Christian Schultz	Liberal-Conservative	Manitoba	September 23, 1882	Macdonald	July 1, 1888
William Sharpe	Conservative	Manitou	February 10, 1916	Borden	April 19, 1942
Mira Spivak	Independent	Manitoba	November 17, 1986	Mulroney	July 12, 2009
Terry Stratton	Conservative	Red River	March 25, 1993	Mulroney	March 16, 2013
John Sutherland	Independent Conservative	Kildonan	December 13, 1871	Macdonald	April 13, 1899
Gunnar Thorvaldson	Progressive Conservative	Winnipeg South	January 29, 1958	Diefenbaker	August 2, 1969
William Michael Wall	Liberal	Winnipeg	July 28, 1955	St. Laurent	July 7, 1962
Robert Watson	Liberal	Portage la Prairie	January 29, 1900	Laurier	May 19, 1929
Finlay McNaughton Young	Liberal	Killarney	January 30, 1900	Laurier	February 15, 1916
Paul Yuzyk	Progressive Conservative	Fort Garry	February 4, 1963	Diefenbaker	July 9, 1986
Rod Zimmer	Liberal	Winnipeg	August 2, 2005	Martin	August 6, 2013
Murray Sinclair	Non-affiliated (ISG)	Manitoba	April 1, 2016	Trudeau, J.	January 31, 2021

Notes:

^{1} Party listed was the last party of which the senator was a member.
^{2} Senators are appointed to represent Manitoba. Each senator may choose to designate a geographic area within Manitoba as their division.
^{3} Senators are appointed by the governor general on the recommendation of the Prime Minister.
^{4} Johnson was appointed as one of two senators under section 26 of the Constitution Act to represent the Western provinces, under the regional expansion clause that saw the Senate increase from 104 to 112 members.
^{5} Division designated as Winnipeg-Interlake from September 27, 1990 to March 29, 2009 and Manitoba from March 30, 2009 to the present.

== Western provinces regional senators ==
Senators listed were appointed to represent the Western Provinces under section 26 of the Constitution Act. This clause has only been used once before to appoint two extra senators to represent four regional Senate divisions: Ontario, Quebec, the Maritimes and the Western Provinces.

As vacancies open up among the normal members of the Senate, they are automatically filled by the regional senators. Regional senators may also designate themselves to a senate division in any province of their choosing in their region.

Name	Party^{1}	Division^{2}	Date appointed	Appointed by^{3}	Date shifted to provincial	Province shifted to	Provincial seat vacated by	End of term
Janis Johnson	Conservative	Winnipeg-Interlake	September 27, 1990	Mulroney	October 4, 1990	Manitoba	Joseph-Philippe Guay	September 27, 2016
Eric Berntson	Progressive Conservative	Saskatchewan	September 27, 1990	Mulroney	January 26, 1991	Saskatchewan	David Steuart	February 27, 2001

Notes:

^{1} Party listed was the last party of which the senator was a member.
^{2} Senators are appointed to represent their region. Each senator may choose to designate a geographic area within their region as their division.
^{3} Senators are appointed by the governor general on the recommendation of the prime minister.

== See also ==
- Lists of Canadian senators
