= List of members of the Senate of Canada (L) =

Senator	Lifespan	Party	Prov.	Entered	Left	Appointed by	Left due to	For life?
David Ovide L'Espérance	1864–1941	C	QC	26 July 1917	31 August 1941	Borden	Death	Y
Patti LaBoucane-Benson	1969–present		AB	3 October 2018	—	Trudeau, J.	—	
Joseph-Henri-Gustave Lacasse	1890–1953	L	ON	10 January 1928	18 January 1953	King	Death	Y
Alexandre Lacoste	1842–1923	C	QC	11 January 1884	13 September 1891	Macdonald	Resignation	Y
Louis Lacoste	1798–1878	C	QC	23 October 1867	26 November 1878	Royal proclamation	Death	Y
Napoléon Kemner Laflamme	1865–1929	L	QC	21 December 1927	10 August 1929	King	Death	Y
Paul Lafond	1919–1988	L	QC	7 October 1970	7 May 1988	Trudeau, P.	Death	
Arthur Laing	1904–1975	L	BC	1 September 1972	3 February 1975	Trudeau, P.	Death	
Henry Laird	1868–1940	C	SK	31 January 1917	30 September 1940	Borden	Death	Y
John Keith McBroom Laird	1907–1985	L	ON	6 April 1967	12 January 1982	Pearson	Retirement	
Norman Platt Lambert	1885–1965	L	ON	20 January 1938	4 November 1965	King	Death	Y
Maurice Lamontagne	1917–1983	L	QC	6 April 1967	12 June 1983	Pearson	Death	
George Landerkin	1839–1903	L	ON	16 February 1901	4 October 1903	Laurier	Death	Y
Auguste Landry	1846–1919	C	QC	23 February 1892	20 December 1919	Abbott	Death	Y
Joseph P. Landry	1922–2008	L	NB	26 February 1996	19 June 1997	Chrétien	Retirement	
Daniel Lang	1919–1997	L	ON	14 February 1964	13 June 1994	Pearson	Voluntary retirement	Y
Daniel Lang	1948–present	C	YT	2 January 2009	15 August 2017	Harper	Resignation	
Léopold Langlois	1913–1996	L	QC	8 July 1966	2 October 1988	Pearson	Retirement	
Frances Lankin	1954–present	NA	ON	1 April 2016	21 October 2024	Trudeau, J.	Retirement	
Laurier LaPierre	1929–2012	L	ON	13 June 2001	21 November 2004	Chrétien	Retirement	
Jean Lapointe	1935–2022	L	QC	13 June 2001	6 December 2010	Chrétien	Retirement	
Renaude Lapointe	1912–2002	L	QC	10 November 1971	3 January 1987	Trudeau, P.	Retirement	
Alphonse Alfred Clément Larivière	1842–1925	C	MB	23 October 1911	1 September 1917	Borden	Resignation	Y
Louis Lavergne	1845–1931	L	QC	13 October 1910	1 January 1930	Laurier	Resignation	Y
Raymond Lavigne	1945–present	L	QC	26 March 2002	21 March 2011	Chrétien	Resignation	
Thérèse Lavoie-Roux	1928–2009	PC	QC	27 September 1990	12 March 2001	Mulroney	Resignation	
Edward M. Lawson	1929–2016	I	BC	7 October 1970	24 September 2004	Trudeau, P.	Retirement	
Jean Le Moyne	1913–1996	L	QC	23 December 1982	17 February 1988	Trudeau, P.	Retirement	
Fernand Leblanc	1917–1996	L	QC	27 March 1979	1 July 1992	Trudeau, P.	Retirement	
Roméo LeBlanc	1927–2009	L	NB	29 June 1984	21 November 1994	Trudeau, P.	Resignation	
Marjory LeBreton	1940–present	C	ON	18 June 1993	4 July 2015	Mulroney	Retirement	
Thomas Lefebvre	1927–1992	L	QC	9 July 1984	20 November 1992	Turner	Death	
J.-Eugène Lefrançois	1896–1979	L	QC	25 April 1957	5 November 1976	St. Laurent	Resignation	Y
Antoine Joseph Léger	1880–1950	C	NB	14 August 1935	7 April 1950	Bennett	Death	Y
Aurel Léger	1894–1961	L	NB	12 June 1953	28 December 1961	St. Laurent	Death	Y
Viola Léger	1930–2023	L	NB	13 June 2001	29 June 2005	Chrétien	Retirement	
Joseph-Hormisdas Legris	1850–1932	L	QC	10 February 1903	6 March 1932	Laurier	Death	Y
Rodolphe Lemieux	1866–1937	L	QC	3 June 1930	28 September 1937	King	Death	Y
Elijah Leonard	1814–1891	L	ON	23 October 1867	14 May 1891	Royal proclamation	Death	Y
Thomas D'Arcy Leonard	1895–1977	L	ON	28 July 1955	9 April 1970	St. Laurent	Voluntary retirement	Y
Joseph Arthur Lesage	1881–1950	L	QC	3 March 1944	9 March 1950	King	Death	Y
James Leslie	1786–1873	C	QC	23 October 1867	6 December 1873	Royal proclamation	Death	Y
Prosper-Edmond Lessard	1873–1931	L	AB	5 September 1925	11 April 1931	King	Death	Y
Luc Letellier de St-Just	1820–1881	NL	QC	23 October 1867	15 December 1876	Royal proclamation	Resignation	Y
James Davies Lewin	1812–1900	L	NB	10 November 1876	11 March 1900	Mackenzie	Death	Y
John Lewis	1858–1935	L	ON	5 September 1925	18 May 1935	King	Death	Y
Philip D. Lewis	1924–2017	L	NL	23 March 1978	28 November 1999	Trudeau, P.	Retirement	
Todd Lewis	1961–present		SK	7 February 2025	—	Trudeau, J.	—	
Edgar Sydney Little	1885–1943	L	ON	10 January 1928	22 December 1943	King	Death	Y
John Locke	1825–1873	L	NS	23 October 1867	12 December 1873	Royal proclamation	Death	Y
Tony Loffreda	1962–present		QC	22 July 2019	—	Trudeau, J.	—	
Hance James Logan	1869–1944	L	NS	5 February 1929	26 December 1944	King	Death	Y
Rose-Marie Losier-Cool	1937–present	L	NB	21 March 1995	18 June 2012	Chrétien	Retirement	
James Alexander Lougheed	1854–1925	LC	NT; AB	10 December 1889; 1 September 1905	1 September 1905; 2 November 1925	Macdonald	Death	Y
Sandra Lovelace Nicholas	1948–present	L	NB	21 September 2005	31 January 2023	Martin	Resignation	
John Lovitt	1832–1908	L	NS	18 December 1896	13 April 1908	Laurier	Death	Y
Paul Lucier	1930–1999	L	YT	23 October 1975	23 July 1999	Trudeau, P.	Death	
George Lynch-Staunton	1858–1940	C	ON	20 January 1917	19 March 1940	Borden	Death	Y
John Lynch-Staunton	1930–2012	C	QC	23 September 1990	19 June 2005	Mulroney	Retirement	
