= List of members of the Senate of Canada (W) =

Senator	Lifespan	Party	Prov.	Entered	Left	Appointed by	Left due to	For life?
Claude Wagner	1925–1979	PC	QC	21 April 1978	11 July 1979	Trudeau, P.	Death	
David James Walker	1905–1995	PC	ON	4 February 1963	30 September 1989	Diefenbaker	Resignation	Y
William Michael Wall	1911–1962	L	MB	28 July 1955	7 July 1962	St. Laurent	Death	Y
John D. Wallace	1949–present	C→NA	NB	22 December 2008	1 February 2017	Harper	Resignation	
Pamela Wallin	1953–present	C→IC→NA	SK	2 January 2009	—	Harper	—	
David Wark	1804–1905	L	NB	23 October 1867	20 August 1905	Royal proclamation	Death	Y
Stanley Waters	1920–1991	R	Alberta	11 June 1990	25 September 1991	Mulroney	Death	
Robert Watson	1853–1929	L	MB	29 January 1900	19 May 1929	Laurier	Death	Y
Charlie Watt	1944–present	L	QC	16 January 1984	16 March 2018	Trudeau, P.	Resignation	
John Webster	1856–1928	C	ON	12 March 1918	1 December 1928	Borden	Death	Y
Lorne Campbell Webster	1871–1941	C	QC	10 January 1920	27 September 1941	Borden	Death	Y
Frank Corbett Welch	1900–1986	PC	NS	25 September 1962	14 July 1975	Diefenbaker	Voluntary retirement	Y
David Wells	1962–present	C	NL	25 January 2013	—	Harper	—	
Kristopher Wells	1970/1971–present		AB	31 August 2024	—	Trudeau, J.	—	
Howard Wetston	1947–present	NA	ON	10 November 2016	3 June 2022	Trudeau, J.	Retirement	
Eugene Whelan	1924–2013	L	ON	9 August 1996	11 July 1999	Chrétien	Retirement	
George Stanley White	1897–1977	PC	ON	20 September 1957	17 November 1972	Diefenbaker	Voluntary retirement	Y
Gerald Verner White	1879–1948	C	ON	6 November 1919	24 October 1948	Borden	Death	Y
Judy White	1964–present		NL	6 July 2023	—	Trudeau, J.	—	
Richard Smeaton White	1865–1936	C	QC	30 July 1917	17 December 1936	Borden	Death	Y
Vernon White	1959–present	C	ON	20 February 2012	2 October 2022	Harper	Resignation	
Jack Wiebe	1936–2007	L	SK	7 April 2000	31 January 2004	Chrétien	Resignation	
Benjamin Wier	1805–1868	L	NS	23 October 1867	14 April 1868	Royal proclamation	Death	Y
Guy Williams	1907–1992	L	BC	9 December 1971	7 October 1982	Trudeau, P.	Retirement	
Harry Albert Willis	1904–1972	PC	ON	15 June 1962	23 March 1972	Diefenbaker	Death	Y
Wellington Willoughby	1859–1932	C	SK	23 October 1917	1 August 1932	Borden	Death	Y
Robert Duncan Wilmot	1809–1891	C	NB	23 October 1867	10 February 1880	Royal proclamation	Resignation	Y
Cairine Wilson	1885–1962	L	ON	15 February 1930	3 March 1962	King	Death	Y
Charles Wilson	1808–1877	C	QC	23 October 1867	4 May 1877	Royal proclamation	Death	Y
Duncan Wilson	1967–present		BC	28 February 2025	—	Trudeau, J.	—	
John Henry Wilson	1834–1912	L	ON	8 March 1904	3 July 1912	Laurier	Death	Y
Joseph-Marcellin Wilson	1859–1940	L	QC	3 May 1911	1 January 1939	Laurier	Resignation	Y
Lawrence Alexander Wilson	1863–1934	L	QC	3 June 1930	3 March 1934	King	Death	Y
Lois Wilson	1927–2024	I	ON	11 June 1998	8 April 2002	Chrétien	Retirement	
Yuen Pau Woo	1963–present	NA	BC	10 November 2016	—	Trudeau, J.	—	
Andrew Trew Wood	1826–1903	L	ON	21 January 1901	21 January 1903	Laurier	Death	Y
Dalia Wood	1924–2013	L	QC	26 March 1979	31 January 1999	Trudeau, P.	Resignation	
Josiah Wood	1843–1927	C	NB	5 August 1895	12 March 1912	Bowell	Resignation	Y
Thomas Harold Wood	1889–1965	L	SK	25 January 1949	26 November 1965	St. Laurent	Death	Y
Allan Lee Woodrow	1886–1966	L	ON	19 May 1953	15 March 1966	St. Laurent	Resignation	Y
