= List of members of the Senate of Canada (K) =

Senator	Lifespan	Party	Prov.	Entered	Left	Appointed by	Left due to	For life?
Nancy Karetak-Lindell	1957–present		NU	19 December 2024		Trudeau, J.		
Henry Kaulback	1830–1896	C	NS	27 March 1872	8 January 1896	Macdonald	Death	Y
Judith Keating	1957–2021		NB	30 January 2020	15 July 2021	Trudeau, J.	Death	
James Kelleher	1930–2013	C	ON	23 September 1990	2 October 2005	Mulroney	Retirement	
William McDonough Kelly	1925–2013	PC	ON	23 December 1982	21 July 2000	Trudeau, P.	Retirement	
Albert Edward Kemp	1858–1929	C	ON	4 November 1921	12 August 1929	Meighen	Death	Y
Betty Kennedy	1926–2017	L	ON	20 June 2000	4 January 2001	Chrétien	Retirement	
Colin Kenny	1943–present	L	ON	29 June 1984	2 February 2018	Trudeau, P.	Resignation	
Edward Kenny	1800–1891	C	NS	23 October 1867	11 April 1876	Royal proclamation	Resignation	Y
Wilbert Keon	1935–2019	C	ON	27 September 1990	17 May 2010	Mulroney	Retirement	
James Kirkpatrick Kerr	1841–1916	L	ON	12 March 1903	4 December 1916	Laurier	Death	Y
William Kerr	1836–1906	L	ON	15 March 1899	22 November 1906	Laurier	Death	Y
Thomas Joseph Kickham	1901–1974	L	PE	8 July 1966	1 December 1974	Pearson	Death	
George Gerald King	1836–1928	L	NB	18 December 1896	28 April 1928	Laurier	Death	Y
James Horace King	1873–1955	L	BC	7 June 1930	14 July 1955	King	Death	Y
Joan Kingston	1955–present		NB	31 October 2023	—	Trudeau, J.	—	
John James Kinley	1881–1971	L	NS	18 April 1945	12 June 1971	King	Resignation	Y
Mary Elizabeth Kinnear	1898–1991	L	ON	6 April 1967	3 April 1973	Pearson	Retirement	
Noël Kinsella	1939–2023	C	NB	12 September 1990	26 November 2014	Mulroney	Retirement	
Michael J. L. Kirby	1941–present	L	NS	13 January 1984	31 October 2006	Trudeau, P.	Resignation	
John Nesbitt Kirchhoffer	1848–1914	C	MB	16 December 1892	22 December 1914	Thompson	Death	Y
Marty Klyne	1957–present		SK	24 September 2018	—	Trudeau, J.	—	
Adrian Knatchbull-Hugessen	1891–1976	L	QC	12 January 1937	1 January 1967	King	Voluntary retirement	Y
Vim Kochhar	1936–present	C	ON	29 January 2010	21 September 2011	Harper	Retirement	
Leo Kolber	1929–2020	L	QC	23 December 1983	18 January 2004	Trudeau, P.	Retirement	
Richard Kroft	1938–present	L	MB	11 June 1998	24 September 2004	Chrétien	Resignation	
Stan Kutcher	1951–present		NS	12 December 2018	—	Trudeau, J.	—	
