= List of members of the Senate of Canada (S) =

Senator	Lifespan	Party	Prov.	Entered	Left	Appointed by	Left due to	For life?
Raymonde Saint-Germain	1951–present	NA	QC	25 November 2016	—	Trudeau, J.	—	
John Sewell Sanborn	1819–1877	L	QC	23 October 1867	1 October 1872	Royal proclamation	Resignation	Y
William Eli Sanford	1838–1899	C	ON	8 February 1887	10 July 1899	Macdonald	Death	Y
Arthur Sauvé	1874–1944	C	QC	20 July 1935	6 February 1944	Bennett	Death	Y
Calixte Savoie	1895–1985	IL	NB	28 July 1955	23 August 1970	St. Laurent	Voluntary retirement	Y
Frederick Laurence Schaffner	1855–1935	C	MB	23 October 1917	22 May 1935	Borden	Death	Y
John Christian Schultz	1840–1896	LC	MB	23 September 1882	1 July 1888	Macdonald	Resignation	Y
Richard William Scott	1825–1913	L	ON	13 March 1874	23 April 1913	Mackenzie	Death	Y
Hugh Segal	1950–2023	C	ON	2 August 2005	15 June 2014	Martin	Resignation	
Judith Seidman	1950–present	C	QC	27 August 2009	1 September 2025	Harper	—	Y
Louis-Adélard Senécal	1829–1887	C	QC	25 January 1887	11 October 1887	Macdonald	Death	Y
Paulette Senior	1961/1962–present		ON	20 December 2023	—	Trudeau, J.	—	
Asha Seth	1939–present	C	ON	6 January 2012	15 December 2014	Harper	Retirement	
Raymond Setlakwe	1928–2021	L	QC	20 June 2000	3 July 2003	Chrétien	Retirement	
Benjamin Seymour	1806–1880	C	ON	23 October 1867	23 March 1880	Royal proclamation	Death	Y
William Henry Sharpe	1868–1942	C	MB	10 February 1916	19 April 1942	Borden	Death	Y
Lytton Shatford	1873–1920	C	BC	26 June 1917	8 November 1920	Borden	Death	Y
James Shaw	1797–1878	C	ON	23 October 1867	6 February 1878	Royal proclamation	Death	Y
Joseph Shehyn	1829–1918	L	QC	5 February 1900	14 July 1918	Laurier	Death	Y
Cyril Sherwood	1915–1996	PC	NB	3 October 1979	1 July 1990	Clark	Retirement	
Ian Shugart	1957–2023		ON	27 September 2022	25 October 2023	Trudeau, J.	Death	
Nick Sibbeston	1943–present	L→NA	NT	2 September 1999	21 November 2017	Chrétien	Retirement	
Jean-Maurice Simard	1931–2001	PC	NB	26 June 1985	16 June 2001	Mulroney	Death	
Paula Simons	1964–present		AB	3 October 2018	—	Trudeau, J.	—	
John Simpson	1812–1885	L	ON	23 October 1867	21 March 1885	Royal proclamation	Death	Y
Ian David Sinclair	1913–2006	L	ON	23 December 1983	27 September 1988	Trudeau, P.	Retirement	
John Ewen Sinclair	1879–1949	L	PE	7 June 1930	23 December 1949	King	Death	Y
Murray Sinclair	1951–2024	NA	MB	2 April 2016	31 January 2021	Trudeau, J.	Resignation	
James Skead	1817–1884	C	ON	23 October 1867	20 January 1881	Royal proclamation	Resignation	Y
James Skead	1817–1884	C	ON	24 December 1881	5 July 1884	Macdonald	Death	Y
Benjamin Franklin Smith	1865–1944	C	NB	14 August 1935	19 May 1944	Bennett	Death	Y
David Smith	1941–2020	L	ON	25 June 2002	16 May 2016	Chrétien	Retirement	
Donald Smith	1905–1985	L	NS	28 July 1955	7 July 1980	St. Laurent	Voluntary retirement	Y
E. D. Smith	1853–1948	C	ON	26 May 1913	10 January 1946	Borden	Resignation	Y
Frank Smith	1822–1901	C	ON	2 February 1871	1 January 1900	Macdonald	Resignation	Y
Larry Smith	1951–present	C	QC	18 December 2010	25 March 2011	Harper	Resignation	Y
Larry Smith	1951–present	C	QC	25 May 2011	28 April 2026	Harper		Y
George Isaac Smith	1909–1982	PC	NS	7 August 1975	19 December 1982	Trudeau, P.	Death	
Sydney John Smith	1892–1976	L	BC	3 January 1957	31 December 1968	St. Laurent	Resignation	Y
Jabez Bunting Snowball	1837–1907	L	NB	1 May 1891	1 February 1902	Macdonald	Resignation	Y
Karen Sorensen	1959–present		AB	29 July 2021	—	Trudeau, J.	—	
Herbert O. Sparrow	1930–2012	L	SK	9 February 1968	4 January 2005	Pearson	Retirement	
James Houston Spence	1867–1939	L	ON	10 January 1928	21 February 1939	King	Death	Y
Mira Spivak	1934–present	C	MB	17 November 1986	12 July 2009	Mulroney	Retirement	
Thomas Simpson Sproule	1843–1917	C	ON	3 December 1915	10 November 1917	Borden	Death	Y
Raymond Squires	1926–2019	L	NL	9 June 2000	6 February 2001	Chrétien	Retirement	
Gerry St. Germain	1937–present	C	BC	23 June 1993	6 November 2012	Mulroney	Retirement	
Édouard-Charles St-Père	1876–1950	L	QC	9 February 1940	31 January 1950	King	Death	Y
Wesley Stambaugh	1888–1970	L	AB	7 September 1949	8 June 1965	St. Laurent	Voluntary retirement	Y
Richard Stanbury	1923–2014	L	ON	13 February 1968	2 May 1998	Pearson	Retirement	
John Stanfield	1868–1934	C	NS	17 February 1921	22 January 1934	Meighen	Death	Y
William Steeves	1814–1873	L	NB	23 October 1867	9 December 1873	Royal proclamation	Death	Y
David Steuart	1916–2010	L	SK	9 December 1976	26 January 1991	Trudeau, P.	Retirement	
Gardner Green Stevens	1814–1892	L	QC	12 February 1876	15 April 1892	Mackenzie	Death	Y
John Stevenson	1873–1956	L	SK	29 January 1940	21 September 1956	King	Death	Y
John Benjamin Stewart	1924–2015	L	NS	13 January 1984	19 November 1999	Trudeau, P.	Retirement	
Carolyn Stewart-Olsen	1946–present	C	NB	27 August 2009	27 July 2021	Harper	Retirement	
Peter Stollery	1935–present	L	ON	2 July 1981	29 November 2010	Trudeau, P.	Retirement	
Terry Stratton	1938–2026	C	MB	25 March 1993	16 March 2013	Mulroney	Retirement	
Joseph Albert Sullivan	1902–1988	PC	ON	12 October 1957	18 February 1985	Diefenbaker	Resignation	Y
Michael Sullivan	1838–1915	C	ON	29 January 1885	29 November 1912	Macdonald	Resignation	Y
Allister Surette	1961–present		NS	19 December 2024	—	Trudeau, J.	—	
Donald Sutherland	1863–1949	C	ON	20 July 1935	1 January 1949	Bennett	Death	Y
John Sutherland	1821–1899	IC	MB	13 December 1871	13 April 1899	Macdonald	Resignation	Y
John Sylvain	1924–2011	PC	QC	7 September 1990	1 February 1996	Mulroney	Resignation	
