= List of members of the Senate of Canada (T) =

Senator	Lifespan	Party	Prov.	Entered	Left	Appointed by	Left due to	For life?
Peter Talbot	1854–1919	L	AB	8 March 1906	6 December 1919	Laurier	Death	Y
Scott Tannas	1962–present	C	AB	25 March 2013	—	Harper	—	
Charles Elliott Tanner	1857–1946	C	NS	20 January 1917	13 January 1946	Borden	Death	Y
Claudette Tardif	1947–present	L	AB	24 March 2005	2 February 2018	Martin	Resignation	
Joseph Tassé	1848–1895	C	QC	9 February 1891	17 January 1895	Macdonald	Death	Y
Austin Claude Taylor	1893–1965	L	NB	3 January 1957	17 January 1965	St. Laurent	Death	Y
George Taylor	1840–1919	C	ON	14 November 1911	26 March 1919	Borden	Death	Y
James Davis Taylor	1863–1941	C	BC	23 October 1917	11 May 1941	Borden	Death	Y
Nicholas Taylor	1927–2020	L	AB	7 March 1996	17 November 2002	Chrétien	Retirement	
William Horace Taylor	1889–1986	L	ON	18 April 1945	1 June 1966	King	Voluntary retirement	Y
Nancy Teed	1949–1993	PC	NB	30 August 1990	29 January 1993	Mulroney	Death	
Thomas Temple	1818–1899	C	NB	23 April 1896	25 August 1899	Bowell	Death	Y
William Templeman	1842–1914	L	BC	18 November 1897	16 February 1906	Laurier	Resignation	Y
Jules Tessier	1852–1934	L	QC	12 March 1903	6 January 1934	Laurier	Death	Y
Ulric-Joseph Tessier	1817–1892	L	QC	23 October 1867	11 February 1873	Royal proclamation	Resignation	Y
Edward Joseph Thériault	1901–1968	L	NS	20 April 1968	20 December 1968	Trudeau, P.	Death	
Norbert Thériault	1921–2016	L	NB	26 March 1979	16 February 1996	Trudeau, P.	Retirement	
Alfred Thibaudeau	1860–1926	L	QC	22 August 1896	15 August 1926	Laurier	Death	Y
Joseph-Rosaire Thibaudeau	1837–1909	L	QC	4 January 1878	16 June 1909	Mackenzie	Death	Y
Andy Thompson	1924–2016	L	ON	6 April 1967	23 March 1998	Pearson	Resignation	
Frederick P. Thompson	1846–1922	L	NB	7 February 1902	27 April 1922	Laurier	Death	Y
William Henry Thorne	1844–1923	C	NB	26 July 1913	8 July 1923	Borden	Death	Y
Gunnar Thorvaldson	1901–1969	PC	MB	29 January 1958	2 August 1969	Diefenbaker	Death	Y
David Tkachuk	1945–present	C	SK	8 June 1993	18 February 2020	Mulroney	Retirement	
Edmund William Tobin	1865–1938	L	QC	3 June 1930	24 June 1938	King	Death	Y
Irving Randall Todd	1861–1932	C	NB	7 March 1918	27 December 1932	Borden	Death	Y
William Todd	1803–1873	L	NB	—		Royal proclamation	Declined	
Arthur Tremblay	1917–1996	PC	QC	27 September 1979	18 June 1992	Clark	Retirement	
Léonard Tremblay	1896–1968	L	QC	12 June 1953	2 September 1965	St. Laurent	Resignation	Y
Marilyn Trenholme Counsell	1933–2026	L	NB	9 September 2003	22 October 2008	Chrétien	Retirement	
François-Xavier-Anselme Trudel	1838–1890	C	QC	31 October 1873	17 January 1890	Macdonald	Death	Y
Geeta Tucker	?–present	NA	MB	7 July 2026		Carney		
James Tunney	1927–2010	L	ON	8 March 2001	16 June 2002	Chrétien	Retirement	
James Gray Turgeon	1879–1964	L	BC	27 January 1947	14 February 1964	King	Death	Y
Onésiphore Turgeon	1849–1944	L	NB	27 October 1922	18 November 1944	King	Death	Y
Charles Turner	1916–1993	L	ON	9 July 1984	24 March 1991	Turner	Retirement	
James Turner	1826–1889	LC	ON	11 January 1884	10 October 1889	Macdonald	Death	Y
John Gillanders Turriff	1855–1930	L	SK	23 September 1918	10 November 1930	Borden	Death	Y
Walter Patrick Twinn	1934–1997	PC	AB	27 September 1990	30 October 1997	Mulroney	Death	
