= List of members of the Senate of Canada (Q) =

Senator	Lifespan	Party	Prov.	Entered	Left	Appointed by	Left due to	For life?
Josie Alice Quart	1895–1980	PC	QC	16 November 1960	17 April 1980	Diefenbaker	Death	Y
Felix Patrick Quinn	1874–1961	C	NS	20 July 1935	28 March 1961	Bennett	Death	Y
Jim Quinn	1957–present	C	NB	22 June 2021	—	Trudeau, J.	—	
Herman William Quinton	1896–1952	L	NL	24 January 1951	2 April 1952	St. Laurent	Death	Y
