= List of members of the Senate of Canada (C) =

| Senator | Lifespan | Party | Prov. | Entered | Left | Appointed by | Left due to | For life? |
|---|---|---|---|---|---|---|---|---|
| James Alexander Calder | 1868–1956 | C | SK | 22 September 1921 | 20 July 1956 | Meighen | Death | Y |
| Catherine Callbeck | 1939–present | L | PE | 23 September 1997 | 25 July 2014 | Chrétien | Retirement | |
| Donald Cameron | 1901–1989 | IL | AB | 28 July 1955 | 19 September 1987 | St. Laurent | Resignation | Y |
| Alexander Campbell | 1822–1892 | C | ON | 23 October 1867 | 7 February 1887 | Royal proclamation | Resignation | Y |
| Archibald Campbell | 1845–1913 | L | ON | 22 November 1907 | 15 January 1913 | Laurier | Death | Y |
| Gordon Peter Campbell | 1898–1964 | L | ON | 19 February 1943 | 16 January 1964 | King | Death | Y |
| Larry Campbell | 1948–present | L→NA | BC | 2 August 2005 | 28 February 2023 | Martin | Retirement | |
| Thomas Cantley | 1857–1945 | C | NS | 20 July 1935 | 24 February 1945 | Bennett | Death | Y |
| Andrew Cardozo | 1956–present | | ON | 21 November 2022 | — | Trudeau, J. | — | |
| Claude Carignan | 1964–present | C | QC | 27 August 2009 | — | Harper | — | |
| John Carling | 1828–1911 | LC | ON | 27 April 1891; 23 April 1896 | 17 February 1892; 6 November 1911 | Macdonald; Bowell | Resignation; Death | Y |
| James William Carmichael | 1819–1903 | L | NS | 31 December 1898 | 24 April 1903 | Laurier | Resignation | Y |
| Pat Carney | 1935–2023 | C | BC | 30 August 1990 | 31 January 2008 | Mulroney | Resignation | |
| Robert William Weir Carrall | 1837–1879 | C | BC | 13 December 1871 | 19 September 1879 | Macdonald | Death | Y |
| Sharon Carstairs | 1942–present | L | MB | 15 September 1994 | 17 October 2011 | Chrétien | Resignation | |
| Chesley William Carter | 1902–1994 | L | NL | 8 July 1966 | 28 July 1977 | Pearson | Retirement | |
| Richard John Cartwright | 1835–1912 | L | ON | 30 September 1904 | 24 September 1912 | Laurier | Death | Y |
| Jedediah Slason Carvell | 1832–1894 | C | PE | 18 December 1879 | 3 July 1889 | Macdonald | Resignation | Y |
| Charles Eusèbe Casgrain | 1825–1907 | C | ON | 12 January 1887 | 8 March 1907 | Macdonald | Death | Y |
| Joseph Philippe Baby Casgrain | 1856–1939 | L | QC | 29 January 1900 | 6 January 1939 | Laurier | Death | Y |
| Thérèse Casgrain | 1896–1981 | I | QC | 7 October 1970 | 10 July 1971 | Trudeau, P. | Retirement | |
| Claude Castonguay | 1929–2020 | PC | QC | 23 September 1990 | 9 December 1992 | Mulroney | Resignation | |
| Joseph-Édouard Cauchon | 1816–1885 | IC | QC | 2 November 1867 | 30 June 1872 | Royal proclamation | Resignation | Y |
| William Henry Chaffers | 1827–1894 | L | QC | 23 October 1867 | 19 July 1894 | Royal proclamation | Death | Y |
| Thelma Chalifoux | 1929–2017 | L | AB | 26 November 1997 | 8 February 2004 | Chrétien | Retirement | |
| Andrée Champagne | 1939–2020 | C | QC | 2 August 2005 | 17 July 2014 | Martin | Retirement | |
| Edward Barron Chandler | 1800–1880 | LC | NB | — | | Royal proclamation | Declined | |
| Jean-Charles Chapais | 1811–1885 | C | QC | 30 January 1868 | 17 July 1885 | Macdonald | Death | Y |
| Thomas Chapais | 1858–1946 | C | QC | 31 December 1919 | 15 July 1946 | Borden | Death | Y |
| Maria Chaput | 1942–present | L | MB | 12 December 2002 | 29 February 2016 | Chrétien | Resignation | |
| Solange Chaput-Rolland | 1919–2001 | PC | QC | 26 September 1988 | 14 May 1994 | Mulroney | Retirement | |
| Guy Charbonneau | 1922–1998 | PC | QC | 27 September 1979 | 21 June 1997 | Clark | Retirement | |
| Marie Charette-Poulin | 1945–present | L | ON | 21 September 1995 | 17 April 2015 | Chrétien | Resignation | |
| Alexandre-René Chaussegros de Léry | 1818–1880 | C | QC | 13 December 1871 | 11 April 1876 | Macdonald | Resignation | Y |
| Pierre-Joseph-Olivier Chauveau | 1820–1890 | C | QC | 20 February 1873 | 8 January 1874 | Macdonald | Resignation | Y |
| Noé Chevrier | 1846–1911 | L | MB | 18 January 1909 | 9 October 1911 | Laurier | Death | Y |
| Eugène Chinic | 1818–1889 | C | QC | 10 April 1873 | 3 November 1882 | Macdonald | Resignation | Y |
| Lionel Choquette | 1906–1983 | PC | ON | 31 January 1958 | 6 March 1981 | Diefenbaker | Voluntary retirement | Y |
| Philippe-Auguste Choquette | 1854–1948 | L | QC | 30 September 1904 | 29 December 1919 | Laurier | Resignation | Y |
| Ione Christensen | 1933–2025 | L | YT | 2 September 1999 | 31 December 2006 | Chrétien | Resignation | |
| David Christie | 1818–1880 | L | ON | 23 October 1867 | 15 December 1880 | Royal proclamation | Death | Y |
| Daniel Christmas | 1956–present | NA | NS | 6 December 2016 | 31 January 2023 | Trudeau, J. | Retirement | |
| Charles Edward Church | 1835–1906 | L | NS | 8 February 1902 | 3 January 1906 | Laurier | Death | Y |
| Ezra Churchill | 1806–1874 | LC | NS | 3 February 1871 | 8 May 1874 | Macdonald | Death | Y |
| Bernadette Clement | 1965–present | | ON | 22 June 2021 | — | Trudeau, J. | — | |
| Francis Clemow | 1821–1902 | C | ON | 3 February 1885 | 28 May 1902 | Macdonald | Death | Y |
| Henry Joseph Cloran | 1855–1928 | L | QC | 30 June 1903 | 8 February 1928 | Laurier | Death | Y |
| Ethel Cochrane | 1937–2026 | C | NL | 17 November 1986 | 23 September 2012 | Mulroney | Retirement | |
| Matthew Henry Cochrane | 1823–1903 | C | QC | 17 October 1872 | 12 August 1903 | Macdonald | Death | Y |
| Thomas Coffey | 1843–1914 | L | ON | 12 March 1903 | 8 June 1914 | Laurier | Death | Y |
| Michel Cogger | 1939–2025 | PC | QC | 2 May 1986 | 1 September 2000 | Mulroney | Resignation | |
| Erminie Cohen | 1926–2019 | PC | NB | 4 June 1993 | 23 July 2001 | Mulroney | Retirement | |
| Ambroise-Hilaire Comeau | 1860–1911 | L | NS | 15 January 1907 | 25 August 1911 | Laurier | Death | Y |
| Gerald Comeau | 1946–2023 | C | NS | 30 August 1990 | 30 November 2013 | Mulroney | Resignation | |
| Joseph William Comeau | 1876–1966 | L | NS | 1 December 1948 | 10 January 1966 | St. Laurent | Resignation | Y |
| Harold Connolly | 1901–1980 | L | NS | 28 July 1955 | 14 May 1979 | St. Laurent | Resignation | Y |
| John Joseph Connolly | 1906–1982 | L | ON | 12 June 1953 | 31 October 1981 | St. Laurent | Voluntary retirement | Y |
| Eric Cook | 1909–1986 | L | NL | 14 February 1964 | 26 July 1984 | Pearson | Voluntary retirement | Y |
| Joan Cook | 1934–present | L | NL | 6 March 1998 | 6 October 2009 | Chrétien | Retirement | |
| Anne Cools | 1943–present | NA | ON | 13 January 1984 | 12 August 2018 | Trudeau, P. | Retirement | |
| Arthur Bliss Copp | 1870–1949 | L | NB | 25 September 1925 | 5 December 1949 | King | Death | Y |
| Eymard Corbin | 1934–present | L | NB | 9 July 1984 | 2 August 2009 | Turner | Retirement | |
| Henry Corby Jr. | 1851–1917 | C | ON | 17 October 1912 | 23 April 1917 | Borden | Death | Y |
| Jane Cordy | 1950–present | L | NS | 9 June 2000 | 18 November 2024 | Chrétien | — | Y |
| Charles Cormier | 1813–1887 | NL | QC | 23 October 1867 | 7 May 1887 | Royal proclamation | Death | Y |
| René Cormier | 1956–present | NA | NB | 10 November 2016 | — | Trudeau, J. | — | |
| Clement Francis Cornwall | 1836–1910 | C | BC | 13 December 1871 | 1 July 1881 | Macdonald | Resignation | Y |
| John Costigan | 1835–1916 | L | NB | 15 January 1907 | 29 September 1916 | Laurier | Death | Y |
| Jean Côté | 1867–1924 | L | AB | 14 August 1923 | 23 September 1924 | King | Death | Y |
| Jean-Pierre Côté | 1926–2002 | L | QC | 1 September 1972 | 20 April 1978 | Trudeau, P. | Resignation | |
| Louis Côté | 1890–1943 | C | ON | 30 December 1933 | 2 February 1943 | Bennett | Death | Y |
| Brent Cotter | 1949–present | | SK | 30 January 2020 | 18 December 2024 | Trudeau, J. | — | Y |
| Ernest G. Cottreau | 1914–2004 | L | NS | 8 May 1974 | 28 January 1989 | Trudeau, P. | Retirement | |
| Henri Courtemanche | 1916–1986 | PC | QC | 20 January 1960 | 22 December 1961 | Diefenbaker | Resignation | Y |
| Jim Cowan | 1942–present | L | NS | 24 March 2005 | 22 January 2017 | Martin | Retirement | |
| George Albertus Cox | 1840–1914 | L | ON | 13 November 1896 | 16 January 1914 | Laurier | Death | Y |
| Mary Coyle | 1954–present | | NS | 4 December 2017 | — | Trudeau, J. | — | |
| George Crawford | 1793–1870 | C | ON | 23 October 1867 | 4 July 1870 | Royal proclamation | Death | Y |
| Thomas Crerar | 1876–1975 | LU | MB | 18 April 1945 | 31 May 1966 | King | Voluntary retirement | Y |
| David Croll | 1900–1991 | L | ON | 28 July 1955 | 11 June 1991 | St. Laurent | Death | Y |
| Adam Brown Crosby | 1859–1921 | C | NS | 20 January 1917 | 10 March 1921 | Borden | Death | Y |
| Thomas Wilson Crothers | 1850–1921 | C | ON | 3 October 1921 | 10 December 1921 | Meighen | Death | Y |
| Sanford Johnston Crowe | 1868–1931 | LU | BC | 1 December 1921 | 23 August 1931 | Meighen | Death | Y |
| Nathaniel Curry | 1851–1931 | C | NS | 20 November 1912 | 23 October 1931 | Borden | Death | Y |
| Rufus Curry | 1859–1934 | L | NS | 12 March 1903 | 30 March 1905 | Laurier | Resignation | Y |
| Rodger Cuzner | 1955–present | | NS | 31 October 2023 | — | Trudeau, J. | — | |
