= List of members of the Senate of Canada (N) =

Senator	Lifespan	Party	Prov.	Entered	Left	Appointed by	Left due to	For life?
Joan Neiman	1920–2022	L	ON	1 September 1972	9 September 1995	Trudeau, P.	Retirement	
Hugh Nelson	1830–1893	LC	BC	12 December 1879	1 March 1887	Macdonald	Resignation	Y
Richard Neufeld	1944–present	C	BC	2 January 2009	6 November 2019	Harper	Retirement	
Thanh Hai Ngo	1947–present	C	ON	6 September 2012	3 January 2022	Harper	Retirement	
John Lang Nichol	1924–2020	L	BC	24 February 1966	19 April 1973	Pearson	Resignation	
Frederic Thomas Nicholls	1856–1921	C	ON	20 January 1917	25 October 1921	Borden	Death	Y
Jacob Nicol	1876–1958	L	QC	14 July 1944	23 September 1958	King	Death	Y
Pierre Claude Nolin	1950–2015	C	QC	18 June 1993	23 April 2015	Mulroney	Death	
Margaret Norrie	1905–1983	L	NS	27 April 1972	16 October 1980	Trudeau, P.	Retirement	
Jeremiah Northup	1816–1879	L	NS	10 October 1870	10 April 1879	Macdonald	Death	Y
Joseph Northwood	1809–1886	LC	ON	19 May 1880	29 October 1886	Macdonald	Death	Y
Nathan Nurgitz	1934–2019	PC	MB	3 October 1979	9 February 1993	Clark	Resignation	
