= List of members of the Senate of Canada (U) =

Senator	Lifespan	Party	Prov.	Entered	Left	Appointed by	Left due to	For life?
Betty Unger	1943–present	C	AB	6 January 2012	21 August 2018	Harper	Retirement	
Earl Wallace Urquhart	1921–1971	L	NS	24 February 1966	17 August 1971	Pearson	Death	
