= List of members of the Senate of Canada (D) =

Senator	Lifespan	Party	Prov.	Entered	Left	Appointed by	Left due to	For life?
Jean-Guy Dagenais	1950–present	C	QC	17 January 2012	—	Harper	—	
Armand Daigle	1892–1957	L	QC	3 March 1944	8 March 1957	King	Death	Y
Roméo Dallaire	1946–present	L	QC	24 March 2005	17 June 2014	Martin	Resignation	
Pierre Dalphond	1954–present		QC	6 June 2018	—	Trudeau, J.	—	
Raoul Dandurand	1861–1942	L	QC	22 January 1898	11 March 1942	Laurier	Death	Y
John Waterhouse Daniel	1845–1933	C	NB	18 March 1912	11 January 1933	Borden	Death	Y
Donna Dasko	1951–present		ON	6 June 2018	—	Trudeau, J.	—	
Keith Davey	1926–2011	L	ON	24 February 1966	1 July 1996	Pearson	Resignation	
Athanase David	1882–1953	L	QC	9 February 1940	26 January 1953	King	Death	Y
Laurent-Olivier David	1840–1926	L	QC	19 June 1903	24 August 1926	Laurier	Death	Y
Paul David	1919–1999	PC	QC	16 April 1985	25 December 1994	Mulroney	Retirement	
Rupert Davies	1879–1967	L	ON	19 November 1942	11 March 1967	King	Death	Y
John Caswell Davis	1888–1953	L	MB	25 January 1949	25 October 1953	St. Laurent	Death	Y
Thomas Osborne Davis	1856–1917	L	NT; SK	30 September 1904; 1 September 1905	1 September 1905; 23 January 1917	Laurier	Death	Y
Dennis Dawson	1949–present	L	QC	2 August 2005	8 February 2023	Martin	Resignation	
Joseph A. Day	1945–2024	L	NB	4 October 2001	24 January 2020	Chrétien	Retirement	
Pierre de Bané	1938–2019	L	QC	29 June 1984	2 August 2013	Trudeau, P.	Retirement	
Robert de Cotret	1944–1999	PC	ON	5 June 1979	14 January 1980	Clark	Resignation	
Colin Deacon	1959–present		NS	15 June 2018	—	Trudeau, J.	—	
Marty Deacon	1958–present		ON	15 February 2018	—	Trudeau, J.	—	
Tony Dean	1953–present	NA	ON	10 November 2016	—	Trudeau, J.	—	
Pierre Antoine Deblois	1815–1898	C	QC	13 February 1883	21 June 1898	Macdonald	Death	Y
Alphonse-Arthur Miville Déchêne	1848–1902	L	QC	13 May 1901	1 May 1902	Laurier	Death	Y
Jacques Demers	1944–present	C→NA	QC	27 August 2009	25 August 2019	Harper	Retirement	
Azellus Denis	1907–1991	L	QC	3 February 1964	4 September 1991	Pearson	Death	Y
William Dennis	1856–1920	IC	NS	20 November 1912	11 July 1920	Borden	Death	Y
William Henry Dennis	1887–1954	C	NS	3 February 1932	18 January 1954	Bennett	Death	Y
Daniel Derbyshire	1846–1916	L	ON	22 November 1907	18 June 1916	Laurier	Death	Y
Jean-Paul Deschatelets	1912–1986	L	QC	24 February 1966	10 January 1986	Pearson	Resignation	
Alphonse Desjardins	1841–1912	C	QC	1 October 1892	16 June 1896	Abbott	Resignation	Y
Jean Noël Desmarais	1924–1995	PC	ON	4 June 1993	25 July 1995	Mulroney	Death	
Paul Desruisseaux	1905–1982	L	QC	8 July 1966	1 May 1980	Pearson	Retirement	
Georges-Casimir Dessaulles	1827–1930	L	QC	12 March 1907	19 April 1930	Laurier	Death	Y
Jean-Marie Dessureault	1888–1970	L	QC	9 June 1945	16 August 1970	King	Resignation	Y
Leverett George DeVeber	1849–1925	L	AB	8 March 1906	9 July 1925	Laurier	Death	Y
James Dever	1825–1904	L	NB	14 March 1868	7 May 1904	Macdonald	Death	Y
Mabel DeWare	1926–2022	PC	NB	23 September 1990	9 August 2001	Mulroney	Retirement	
Baltej Singh Dhillon	1966–present		BC	7 February 2025		Trudeau, J.		
Consiglio Di Nino	1938–present	C	ON	30 August 1990	30 June 2012	Mulroney	Retirement	
Robert B. Dickey	1812–1903	C	NS	23 October 1867	14 July 1903	Royal proclamation	Death	Y
Fred Dickson	1937–2012	C	NS	22 December 2008	9 February 2012	Harper	Death	
Walter Hamilton Dickson	1806–1885	C	ON	23 October 1867	19 February 1884	Royal proclamation	Resignation	Y
John Dobson	1824–1907	C	ON	23 February 1892	27 January 1907	Abbott	Death	Y
James Domville	1842–1921	L	NB	20 April 1903	30 July 1921	Laurier	Death	Y
Richard Donahoe	1909–2000	PC	NS	13 September 1979	27 September 1984	Clark	Retirement	
James J. Donnelly	1866–1948	C	ON	26 May 1913	20 October 1948	Borden	Death	Y
C. William Doody	1931–2005	C	NL	3 October 1979	27 December 2005	Clark	Death	
James Joseph Hayes Doone	1888–1953	L	NB	25 June 1949	6 April 1953	St. Laurent	Death	Y
James Moffat Douglas	1839–1920	IL	SK	8 March 1906	19 August 1920	Laurier	Death	Y
Percy Downe	1954–present	L	PE	26 June 2003	—	Chrétien	—	
Norman Doyle	1945–present	C	NL	6 January 2012	11 November 2020	Harper	Retirement	
Richard Doyle	1923–2003	PC	ON	19 March 1985	10 March 1998	Mulroney	Retirement	
Mark Robert Drouin	1903–1963	PC	QC	4 October 1957	12 October 1963	Diefenbaker	Death	Y
George Alexander Drummond	1829–1910	C	QC	1 December 1888	2 February 1910	Macdonald	Death	Y
Pamphile Réal Du Tremblay	1879–1955	L	QC	19 November 1942	6 October 1955	King	Death	Y
Antoine Juchereau Duchesnay	1809–1886	C	QC	23 October 1867	7 January 1871	Royal proclamation	Resignation	Y
Elzéar-Henri Juchereau Duchesnay	1809–1871	C	QC	23 October 1867	12 May 1871	Royal proclamation	Death	Y
William Duff	1872–1953	L	NS	28 February 1936	25 April 1953	King	Death	Y
Joseph James Duffus	1876–1957	L	ON	15 February 1940	7 February 1957	King	Death	Y
Mike Duffy	1946–present	C→NA	PE	2 January 2009	27 May 2021	Harper	Retirement	
James Duggan	1903–1980	L	NL	8 July 1966	28 February 1978	Pearson	Resignation	
Ron Duhamel	1938–2002	L	MB	15 January 2002	30 September 2002	Chrétien	Death	
Léandre Dumouchel	1811–1882	C	QC	23 October 1867	23 September 1882	Royal proclamation	Death	Y
Pat Duncan	1960–present		YT	12 December 2018	—	Trudeau, J.	—	
Suzanne Duplessis	1940–present	C	QC	22 December 2008	30 June 2015	Harper	Retirement	
Renée Dupuis	1949–present	NA	QC	10 November 2016	16 January 2024	Trudeau, J.	Retirement	
Vincent Dupuis	1889–1967	L	QC	18 April 1945	11 May 1967	King	Death	Y
Lillian Dyck	1945–present	IND→IL→L	SK	24 March 2005	24 August 2020	Martin	Retirement	
