= List of members of the Senate of Canada (B) =

Senator	Lifespan	Party	Prov.	Entered	Left	Appointed by	Left due to	For life?
Lise Bacon	1934–2025	L	QC	15 September 1994	25 August 2009	Chrétien	Retirement	
Pierre Baillargeon	1812–1891	L	QC	27 March 1874	15 December 1891	Mackenzie	Death	Y
Alexander Boyd Baird	1891–1967	L	NL	17 August 1949	23 November 1967	St. Laurent	Death	Y
George Thomas Baird	1847–1917	C	NB	19 June 1895	21 April 1917	Bowell	Death	Y
George Baker	1942–present	L	NL	26 March 2002	4 September 2017	Chrétien	Retirement	
George Barnard Baker	1834–1910	LC	QC	7 January 1896	9 February 1910	Bowell	Death	Y
James Balfour	1928–1999	PC	SK	13 September 1979	12 December 1999	Clark	Death	
Charles Ballantyne	1867–1950	C	QC	3 February 1932	19 October 1950	Bennett	Death	Y
Tommy Banks	1936–2018	L	AB	7 April 2000	17 December 2011	Chrétien	Retirement	
George Hilton Barbour	1878–1962	L	PE	6 July 1949	6 February 1962	St. Laurent	Death	Y
George Henry Barnard	1868–1954	C	BC	23 October 1917	8 November 1945	Borden	Resignation	Y
Staff Barootes	1918–2000	PC	SK	21 December 1984	25 May 1993	Mulroney	Resignation	
Irvine Barrow	1913–2005	L	NS	8 May 1974	15 February 1988	Trudeau, P.	Retirement	
Michael Basha	1896–1976	L	NL	24 January 1951	18 November 1976	St. Laurent	Resignation	Y
Denise Batters	1970–present	C	SK	25 January 2013	—	Harper	—	
Jean Bazin	1940–2019	PC	QC	29 December 1986	8 December 1989	Mulroney	Resignation	
Arthur-Lucien Beaubien	1879–1971	L	MB	29 January 1940	1 February 1969	King	Resignation	Y
Charles-Philippe Beaubien	1870–1949	C	QC	3 December 1915	17 January 1949	Borden	Death	Y
Louis-Philippe Beaubien	1903–1985	PC	QC	16 November 1960	28 March 1985	Diefenbaker	Death	Y
Gérald Beaudoin	1929–2008	C	QC	26 September 1988	15 April 2004	Mulroney	Retirement	
Mario Beaulieu	1930–1998	PC	QC	30 August 1990	22 June 1994	Mulroney	Resignation	
Élie Beauregard	1884–1954	L	QC	9 February 1940	27 August 1954	King	Death	Y
François Béchard	1830–1897	L	QC	17 July 1896	13 April 1897	Laurier	Death	Y
Frédéric Liguori Béique	1845–1933	L	QC	7 February 1902	12 September 1933	Laurier	Death	Y
Robert Beith	1843–1922	L	ON	15 January 1907	26 January 1922	Laurier	Death	Y
Henri Sévérin Béland	1869–1935	L	QC	5 September 1925	22 April 1935	King	Death	Y
Napoléon Belcourt	1860–1932	L	ON	22 November 1907	7 August 1932	Laurier	Death	Y
Rhéal Bélisle	1919–1992	PC	ON	4 February 1963	3 November 1992	Diefenbaker	Death	Y
Adam Carr Bell	1847–1912	C	NS	23 October 1911	30 October 1912	Borden	Death	Y
Nancy Bell	1924–1989	L	BC	7 October 1970	29 November 1989	Trudeau, P.	Death	
Narcisse-Fortunat Belleau	1808–1894	C	QC	—		Royal proclamation	Declined	Y
Diane Bellemare	1949–present	C→NA	QC	6 September 2012	13 October 2024	Harper	—	Y
Joseph-Hyacinthe Bellerose	1820–1899	C	QC	7 October 1873	13 August 1899	Macdonald	Death	Y
Aimé Bénard	1873–1938	C	MB	3 September 1917	8 January 1938	Borden	Death	Y
John Joseph Bench	1905–1947	L	ON	19 November 1942	9 December 1947	King	Death	Y
William Moore Benidickson	1911–1985	L	ON	7 July 1965	1 April 1985	Pearson	Death	
William Humphrey Bennett	1859–1925	C	ON	13 November 1917	15 March 1925	Borden	Death	Y
James Rea Benson	1807–1885	LC	ON	14 March 1868	18 March 1885	Macdonald	Death	Y
Wanda Thomas Bernard	1953–present	NA	NS	10 November 2016	—	Trudeau, J.	—	
Thomas-Alfred Bernier	1844–1908	C	MB	27 October 1892	30 December 1908	Abbott	Death	Y
Eric Berntson	1941–2018	PC	SK	27 September 1990	27 February 2001	Mulroney	Resignation	
Lynn Beyak	1949–present	C	ON	25 January 2013	25 January 2021	Harper	Resignation	
Martha Bielish	1915–2010	PC	AB	27 September 1979	26 September 1990	Clark	Resignation	
Caleb Rand Bill	1806–1872	LC	NS	23 October 1867	1 February 1872	Royal proclamation	Death	Y
Florence Bird	1908–1998	L	ON	23 March 1978	15 January 1983	Trudeau, P.	Retirement	
Michel Biron	1934–2023	L	QC	4 October 2001	16 March 2009	Chrétien	Retirement	
Charles Lawrence Bishop	1876–1966	L	ON	18 April 1945	23 September 1966	King	Resignation	Y
Doug Black	1952–present	C→NA	AB	25 January 2013	31 October 2021	Harper	Resignation	
Frank Bunting Black	1869–1945	C	NB	25 November 1921	28 February 1945	Meighen	Death	Y
Robert Black	1962–present		ON	15 February 2018	—	Trudeau, J.	—	
Thomas Reuben Black	1832–1905	L	NS	10 June 1904	14 September 1905	Laurier	Death	Y
Richard Blain	1857–1926	C	ON	26 July 1917	27 November 1926	Borden	Death	Y
Adam Johnston Fergusson Blair	1815–1867	L	ON	23 October 1867	29 December 1867	Royal proclamation	Death	Y
Aristide Blais	1875–1964	L	AB	29 January 1940	10 November 1964	King	Death	Y
Oliver Blake	1802–1873	L	ON	23 October 1867	10 December 1873	Royal proclamation	Death	Y
Frederick Murray Blois	1893–1984	PC	NS	14 January 1960	12 October 1976	Diefenbaker	Resignation	Y
Peter Boehm	1954–present		ON	3 October 2018	—	Trudeau, J.	—	
Pierre-Édouard Blondin	1874–1943	C	QC	20 July 1918	29 October 1943	Borden	Death	Y
Henri Charles Bois	1897–1962	L	QC	3 January 1957	18 July 1962	St. Laurent	Death	Y
Pierre-Hugues Boisvenu	1949–present	C	QC	29 January 2010	11 February 2024	Harper	Retirement	
Joseph Bolduc	1847–1924	NC	QC	3 October 1884	13 August 1924	Macdonald	Death	Y
Roch Bolduc	1928–present	C	QC	26 September 1988	10 September 2003	Mulroney	Retirement	
Gwen Boniface	1955–present	NA	ON	10 November 2016	15 November 2025	Trudeau, J.	—	Y
Lorne Bonnell	1923–2006	L	PE	15 November 1971	4 January 1998	Trudeau, P.	Retirement	
Peter Bosa	1927–1998	L	ON	5 April 1977	10 December 1998	Trudeau, P.	Death	
Joseph-Noël Bossé	1807–1881	C	QC	23 October 1867	1 January 1868	Royal proclamation	Resignation	Y
Hewitt Bostock	1864–1930	L	BC	6 June 1904	28 April 1930	Laurier	Death	Y
Amos Edwin Botsford	1804–1894	C	NB	23 October 1867	22 March 1894	Royal proclamation	Death	Y
Télesphore-Damien Bouchard	1881–1962	L	QC	3 March 1944	13 November 1962	King	Death	Y
William Albert Boucher	1889–1976	L	SK	3 January 1957	23 June 1976	St. Laurent	Death	Y
Charles Boucher de Boucherville	1822–1915	C	QC	12 February 1879	11 September 1915	Macdonald	Death	Y
Bernie Boudreau	1944–present	L	NS	4 October 1999	26 October 2000	Chrétien	Resignation	
Victor Boudreau	1970–present		NB	28 June 2024	—	Trudeau, J.	—	
Paul Henri Bouffard	1895–1966	L	QC	27 December 1946	16 February 1966	King	Death	Y
Charles Arkoll Boulton	1841–1899	LC	MB	10 December 1889	15 May 1899	Macdonald	Death	Y
Charles Bourgeois	1879–1940	C	QC	15 August 1935	15 May 1940	Bennett	Death	Y
Maurice Bourget	1907–1979	L	QC	27 April 1963	29 March 1979	Pearson	Death	Y
John George Bourinot	1814–1884	LC	NS	23 October 1867	21 January 1884	Royal proclamation	Death	Y
Romuald Bourque	1889–1974	L	QC	6 July 1963	14 August 1974	Pearson	Death	Y
Thomas-Jean Bourque	1864–1952	C	NB	20 January 1917	16 February 1952	Borden	Death	Y
Patricia Bovey	1948–present	NA	MB	10 November 2016	15 May 2023	Trudeau, J.	Retirement	
Mackenzie Bowell	1823–1917	C	ON	5 December 1892	10 December 1917	Thompson	Death	Y
John Boyd	1826–1893	LC	NB	11 February 1880	21 September 1893	Macdonald	Resignation	Y
Arthur Boyer	1851–1922	L	QC	28 June 1909	24 January 1922	Laurier	Death	Y
Gustave Benjamin Boyer	1871–1927	L	QC	11 March 1922	2 December 1927	King	Death	Y
Yvonne Boyer	1953–present		ON	15 March 2018	—	Trudeau, J.	—	
George Henry Bradbury	1859–1925	C	MB	17 December 1917	6 September 1925	Borden	Death	Y
Joseph-Arthur Bradette	1886–1961	L	ON	12 June 1953	12 September 1961	St. Laurent	Death	Y
Frederick Gordon Bradley	1888–1966	L	NL	12 June 1953	30 March 1966	St. Laurent	Death	Y
David Braley	1941–2020	C	ON	20 May 2010	30 November 2013	Harper	Resignation	
Patrick Brazeau	1974–present	C→IC→NA	QC	8 January 2009	—	Harper	—	
Alfred Johnson Brooks	1890–1967	PC	NB	12 September 1960	7 November 1967	Diefenbaker	Resignation	Y
William Henry Brouse	1824–1881	R	ON	9 August 1878	23 August 1881	Mackenzie	Death	Y
Albert Joseph Brown	1861–1938	C	QC	6 October 1932	16 November 1938	Bennett	Death	Y
Bert Brown	1938–2018	C	AB	10 July 2007	22 March 2013	Harper	Retirement	
George Brown	1818–1880	L	ON	16 December 1873	9 May 1880	Mackenzie	Death	Y
William Brunt	1902–1962	PC	ON	12 October 1957	7 July 1962	Diefenbaker	Death	Y
John G. Bryden	1937–2016	L	NB	23 November 1994	31 October 2009	Chrétien	Resignation	
John Buchanan	1931–2019	C	NS	12 September 1990	22 April 2006	Mulroney	Retirement	
John Alexander Buchanan	1887–1976	PC	AB	15 January 1959	2 October 1965	Diefenbaker	Voluntary retirement	Y
William Ashbury Buchanan	1876–1954	L	AB	5 September 1925	11 July 1954	King	Death	Y
Sidney Buckwold	1916–2001	L	SK	4 November 1971	3 November 1991	Trudeau, P.	Retirement	
Harcourt Burland Bull	1824–1881	C	ON	24 February 1879	12 August 1881	Macdonald	Death	Y
George Percival Burchill	1889–1977	L	NB	19 April 1945	19 August 1977	King	Resignation	Y
Jacques Bureau	1860–1933	L	QC	5 September 1925	23 January 1933	King	Death	Y
Jacques-Olivier Bureau	1820–1883	L	QC	23 October 1867	7 February 1883	Royal proclamation	Death	Y
Sharon Burey	1957–present		ON	21 November 2022	—	Trudeau, J.	—	
Vincent P. Burke	1878–1953	L	NL	25 January 1950	19 December 1953	St. Laurent	Death	Y
Asa Allworth Burnham	1808–1873	C	ON	23 October 1867	10 May 1873	Royal proclamation	Death	Y
Kennedy Francis Burns	1842–1895	L	NB	21 March 1893	23 June 1895	Thompson	Death	Y
Patrick Burns	1856–1937	I	AB	6 July 1931	1 June 1936	Bennett	Resignation	Y
Charles Burpee	1817–1909	L	NB	1 February 1900	19 July 1900	Laurier	Resignation	Y
Bev Busson	1951–present		BC	27 September 2018	—	Trudeau, J.	—	
JoAnne Buth	1954–present	C	MB	6 January 2012	10 August 2014	Harper	Resignation	
Peggy Butts	1924–2004	L	NS	23 September 1997	15 August 1999	Chrétien	Retirement	
