= List of members of the Senate of Canada (H) =

Senator	Lifespan	Party	Prov.	Entered	Left	Appointed by	Left due to	For life?
John Thomas Hackett	1884–1956	PC	QC	28 July 1955	15 September 1956	St. Laurent	Death	Y
Stanley Haidasz	1923–2009	L	ON	23 March 1978	4 March 1998	Trudeau, P.	Retirement	
James Campbell Haig	1909–1980	PC	MB	15 June 1962	29 December 1977	Diefenbaker	Resignation	Y
John Thomas Haig	1877–1962	C	MB	14 August 1935	17 January 1962	Bennett	Resignation	Y
John Hamilton	1827–1888	C	QC	23 October 1867	1 May 1887	Royal proclamation	Resignation	Y
John Hamilton	1802–1882	C	ON	23 October 1867	10 October 1882	Royal proclamation	Death	Y
Mac Harb	1953–present	L/Ind	ON	9 September 2003	26 August 2013	Chrétien	Resignation	
Peter Harder	1952–present	NA	ON	23 March 2016	—	Trudeau, J.	—	
Richard Hardisty	1831–1889	C	NT	23 February 1888	18 October 1889	Macdonald	Death	Y
Arthur Charles Hardy	1872–1962	L	ON	10 February 1922	13 March 1962	King	Death	Y
William Harmer	1872–1947	L	AB	5 February 1918	9 September 1947	Borden	Death	Y
Nancy Hartling	1950–present	NA	NB	10 November 2016	1 February 2025	Trudeau, J.	—	Y
Earl Hastings	1924–1996	L	AB	24 February 1966	5 May 1996	Pearson	Death	
Paul Hatfield	1873–1935	L	NS	7 October 1926	28 January 1935	King	Death	Y
Richard Hatfield	1931–1991	PC	NB	7 September 1990	26 April 1991	Mulroney	Death	
Thomas Heath Haviland	1822–1895	C	PE	18 October 1873	1 July 1879	Macdonald	Resignation	Y
Charles G. Hawkins	1887–1958	L	NS	2 May 1950	14 August 1958	St. Laurent	Death	Y
Katherine Hay	1961–present		ON	7 March 2025	—	Trudeau, J.	—	
Salter Hayden	1896–1987	L	ON	9 February 1940	1 November 1983	King	Resignation	Y
Andrew Haydon	1867–1932	L	ON	10 March 1924	10 November 1932	King	Death	Y
Dan Hays	1939–present	L	AB	29 June 1984	30 June 2007	Trudeau, P.	Resignation	
Harry Hays	1909–1982	L	AB	24 February 1966	4 May 1982	Pearson	Death	
Robert Haythorne	1815–1891	L	PE	18 October 1873	7 May 1891	Macdonald	Death	Y
Robert Leonard Hazen	1808–1874	C	NB	23 October 1867	15 August 1874	Royal proclamation	Death	Y
Jacques Hébert	1923–2007	L	QC	20 April 1983	21 June 1998	Trudeau, P.	Retirement	
Martine Hébert	1965–present		QC	7 February 2025		Trudeau, J.		
Danièle Henkel	1956–present		QC	14 February 2025	—	Trudeau, J.	—	
Céline Hervieux-Payette	1941–present	L	QC	21 March 1995	22 April 2016	Chrétien	Retirement	
Henry Hicks	1915–1990	L	NS	27 April 1972	5 March 1990	Trudeau, P.	Retirement	
John Gilbert Higgins	1891–1963	PC	NL	15 January 1959	1 July 1963	Diefenbaker	Death	Y
William Hales Hingston	1829–1907	C	QC	2 January 1896	19 February 1907	Bowell	Death	Y
John Hnatyshyn	1907–1967	PC	SK	15 January 1959	2 May 1967	Diefenbaker	Death	Y
Horatio Clarence Hocken	1857–1937	C	ON	30 December 1933	18 February 1937	Bennett	Death	Y
Nancy Hodges	1888–1969	L	BC	5 November 1953	12 June 1965	St. Laurent	Resignation	Y
Malcolm Mercer Hollett	1891–1985	PC	NL	6 October 1961	31 March 1971	Diefenbaker	Voluntary retirement	Y
John Holmes	1789–1876	C	NS	23 October 1867	3 June 1876	Royal proclamation	Death	Y
Adam Hope	1813–1882	L	ON	3 January 1877	7 August 1882	Mackenzie	Death	Y
Ralph Horner	1884–1964	C	SK	30 December 1933	14 December 1964	Bennett	Death	Y
Henry Herbert Horsey	1871–1942	L	ON	14 December 1928	6 January 1942	King	Death	Y
Leo Housakos	1968–present	C	QC	8 January 2009	—	Harper	—	
Charles Benjamin Howard	1885–1964	L	QC	9 February 1940	25 March 1964	King	Death	Y
John Power Howden	1879–1959	L	MB	18 April 1945	4 November 1959	King	Death	Y
George William Howlan	1835–1901	L	PE	18 October 1873; 5 January 1881; 25 March 1891	27 December 1880; 18 February 1891; 1 February 1894	Macdonald; Macdonald; Macdonald	Resignation; Resignation; Resignation	Y
Libbe Hubley	1942–present	L	PE	8 March 2001	8 September 2017	Chrétien	Retirement	
James Joseph Hughes	1856–1941	L	PE	5 September 1925	5 March 1941	King	Death	Y
Raoul Hurtubise	1882–1955	L	ON	9 June 1945	31 January 1955	King	Death	Y
William James Hushion	1883–1954	L	QC	15 February 1940	29 January 1954	King	Death	Y
