= List of members of the Senate of Canada (O) =

Senator	Lifespan	Party	Prov.	Entered	Left	Appointed by	Left due to	For life?
James O'Brien	1836–1903	LC	QC	2 January 1896	28 May 1903	Bowell	Death	Y
Michael John O'Brien	1851–1940	C	ON	1 September 1918	1 September 1925	Borden	Resignation	Y
Frank Patrick O'Connor	1885–1939	C	ON	6 December 1935	21 August 1939	King	Death	Y
William Hunter Odell	1811–1891	C	NB	23 October 1867	25 July 1891	Royal proclamation	Death	Y
John O'Donohoe	1824–1902	LC	ON	21 May 1882	7 December 1902	Macdonald	Death	Y
Kelvin Ogilvie	1942–2025	C	NS	27 August 2009	6 November 2017	Harper	Retirement	
Victor Oh	1949–present	C	ON	25 January 2013	9 June 2024	Harper	Retirement	
Clement O'Leary	1916–1969	PC	NS	25 September 1962	12 June 1969	Diefenbaker	Death	Y
Grattan O'Leary	1888–1976	PC	ON	24 September 1962	7 April 1976	Diefenbaker	Death	Y
Alexander Walker Ogilvie	1829–1902	C	QC	24 December 1881	18 January 1901	Macdonald	Resignation	Y
Donald Oliver	1938–2025	C	NS	7 September 1990	16 November 2013	Mulroney	Retirement	
Louis Auguste Olivier	1816–1881	C	QC	23 October 1867	8 September 1873	Royal proclamation	Resignation	Y
Bud Olson	1925–2002	C	AB	5 April 1977	7 March 1996	Trudeau, P.	Resignation	
Ratna Omidvar	1949–present	NA	ON	1 April 2016	5 November 2024	Trudeau, J.	—	Y
Gigi Osler	1968–present		MB	26 September 2022	—	Trudeau, J.	—	
Gerry Ottenheimer	1934–1998	PC	NL	30 December 1987	18 January 1998	Mulroney	Death	
Manuelle Oudar	1963–present		QC	13 February 2024	—	Trudeau, J.	—	
Rodney Ouellette	?–present		NB	7 July 2026	—	Carney	—	
William Owens	1840–1917	C	QC	2 January 1896	8 June 1917	Bowell	Death	Y
