= List of members of the Senate of Canada (V) =

Senator	Lifespan	Party	Prov.	Entered	Left	Appointed by	Left due to	For life?
Cyrille Vaillancourt	1892–1969	L	QC	3 March 1944	3 January 1969	King	Resignation	Y
George Van Roggen	1921–1992	L	BC	4 November 1971	8 June 1992	Trudeau, P.	Death	
Toni Varone	1900s–present		ON	20 December 2023	—	Trudeau, J.	—	
Clarence Joseph Veniot	1886–1977	L	NB	18 April 1945	1 June 1966	King	Voluntary retirement	Y
Josée Verner	1959–present	C→NA	QC	13 June 2011	—	Harper	—	
Alexander Vidal	1819–1906	C	ON	15 January 1873	18 November 1906	Macdonald	Death	Y
Thomas Vien	1881–1972	L	QC	5 October 1942	1 April 1968	King	Resignation	Y
Joseph-Octave Villeneuve	1836–1901	C	QC	2 January 1896	27 June 1901	Bowell	Death	Y
