= List of members of the Senate of Canada (E) =

Senator	Lifespan	Party	Prov.	Entered	Left	Appointed by	Left due to	For life?
Nicole Eaton	1945–present	C	ON	2 January 2009	21 January 2020	Harper	Retirement	
William Cameron Edwards	1844–1921	L	ON	17 March 1903	17 September 1921	Laurier	Death	Y
Art Eggleton	1943–present	L	ON	24 March 2005	29 September 2018	Martin	Retirement	
John Campbell Elliott	1872–1941	L	ON	29 January 1940	20 December 1941	King	Death	Y
John Valentine Ellis	1835–1913	L	NB	3 September 1900	10 June 1913	Laurier	Death	Y
Clarence Emerson	1901–1963	PC	NB	12 October 1957	25 September 1963	Diefenbaker	Death	Y
Henry Read Emmerson	1883–1954	L	NB	25 June 1949	21 June 1954	St. Laurent	Death	Y
Tobias Enverga	1955–2017	C	ON	6 September 2012	16 November 2017	Harper	Death	
Raymond Eudes	1912–1980	L	QC	8 April 1968	25 October 1980	Pearson	Death	
William Daum Euler	1875–1961	L	ON	11 May 1940	15 July 1961	King	Death	Y
Douglas Everett	1927–2018	L	MB	8 November 1966	20 January 1994	Pearson	Resignation	
John Ewasew	1922–1978	L	QC	17 December 1976	26 March 1978	Trudeau, P.	Death	
Trevor Eyton	1934–2019	C	ON	23 September 1990	12 July 2009	Mulroney	Retirement	
