= List of members of the Senate of Canada (G) =

Senator	Lifespan	Party	Prov.	Entered	Left	Appointed by	Left due to	For life?
Raymonde Gagné	1956–present	NA	MB	1 April 2016	—	Trudeau, J.	—	
Rosa Galvez	1961–present	NA	QC	6 December 2016	—	Trudeau, J.	—	
Jean-Robert Gauthier	1929–2009	L	ON	23 November 1994	22 October 2004	Chrétien	Retirement	
Louis-Philippe Gélinas	1902–1976	L	QC	11 June 1963	10 December 1975	Pearson	Resignation	Y
Amina Gerba	1961–present		QC	29 July 2021	—	Trudeau, J.	—	
Frederick William Gershaw	1883–1968	L	AB	18 April 1945	26 March 1968	King	Resignation	Y
Irving Gerstein	1941–present	C	ON	22 December 2008	20 February 2016	Harper	Retirement	
Ron Ghitter	1935–present	PC	AB	25 March 1993	31 March 2000	Mulroney	Resignation	
Thomas Nicholson Gibbs	1821–1883	LC	ON	3 April 1880	7 April 1883	Macdonald	Death	Y
William Gibson	1849–1914	L	ON	11 February 1902	4 May 1914	Laurier	Death	Y
Philippe Gigantès	1923–2004	L	QC	13 January 1984	16 August 1998	Trudeau, P.	Retirement	
Clément Gignac	1955–present		QC	29 July 2021	—	Trudeau, J.	—	
Louis Giguère	1911–2002	L	QC	10 September 1968	18 December 1986	Trudeau, P.	Retirement	
Aurélien Gill	1933–2015	L	QC	17 September 1998	26 August 2008	Chrétien	Retirement	
Archibald Beaton Gillis	1864–1940	C	SK	17 October 1921	18 January 1940	Meighen	Death	Y
Arthur Hill Gillmor	1824–1903	L	NB	2 April 1900	13 April 1903	Laurier	Death	Y
Daniel Gillmor	1849–1918	L	NB	15 January 1907	22 February 1918	Laurier	Death	Y
Marc-Amable Girard	1822–1892	C	MB	13 December 1871	12 September 1892	Macdonald	Death	Y
Edward Lavin Girroir	1871–1932	C	NS	20 November 1912	8 May 1932	Borden	Death	Y
James Gladstone	1887–1971	IC	AB	31 January 1958	31 March 1971	Diefenbaker	Resignation	Y
Robert Gladstone	1879–1951	L	ON	7 September 1949	1 June 1951	St. Laurent	Death	Y
John Glasier	1809–1894	L	NB	14 March 1868	7 July 1894	Macdonald	Death	Y
Joseph Godbout	1850–1923	L	QC	4 April 1901	1 April 1923	Laurier	Death	Y
Adélard Godbout	1892–1956	L	QC	25 June 1949	18 September 1956	St. Laurent	Death	Y
John Morrow Godfrey	1912–2001	L	ON	5 October 1973	28 June 1987	Trudeau, P.	Retirement	
Marc Gold	1950–present	NA	QC	25 November 2016	30 June 2025	Trudeau, J.	—	Y
Carl Goldenberg	1907–1996	L	QC	4 November 1971	20 October 1982	Trudeau, P.	Retirement	
William Henry Golding	1878–1961	L	ON	25 June 1949	31 December 1961	St. Laurent	Death	Y
Yoine Goldstein	1934–2020	L	QC	29 August 2005	11 May 2009	Martin	Retirement	
George Gordon	1865–1942	C	ON	17 October 1912	3 February 1942	Borden	Death	Y
Léon Mercier Gouin	1891–1983	L	QC	7 November 1940	18 March 1976	King	Resignation	Y
James Robert Gowan	1815–1909	LC	ON	29 January 1885	1 February 1907	Macdonald	Resignation	Y
Jerry Grafstein	1935–present	L	ON	13 January 1984	2 January 2010	Trudeau, P.	Retirement	
Alasdair Graham	1929–2015	L	NS	27 April 1972	21 May 2004	Trudeau, P.	Retirement	
George Perry Graham	1859–1943	L	ON	20 December 1926	1 January 1943	King	Death	Y
Robert Patterson Grant	1814–1892	L	NS	2 February 1877	13 November 1892	Mackenzie	Death	Y
Thomas Vincent Grant	1876–1966	L	PE	25 June 1949	19 August 1965	St. Laurent	Voluntary retirement	Y
Robert Francis Green	1861–1946	C	BC	3 October 1921	5 October 1946	Meighen	Death	Y
Joe Greene	1920–1978	L	ON	1 September 1972	23 October 1978	Trudeau, P.	Death	
Nancy Greene Raine	1943–present	C	BC	2 January 2009	11 May 2018	Harper	Retirement	
Stephen Greene	1949–present	C→IR	NS	2 January 2009	8 December 2024	Harper	—	Y
Margo Lainne Greenwood	1953–present		BC	10 November 2022	—	Trudeau, J.	—	
William Antrobus Griesbach	1878–1945	C	AB	15 September 1921	21 January 1945	Meighen	Death	Y
Diane Griffin	1947–present	NA	PE	10 November 2016	18 March 2022	Trudeau, J.	Retirement	
Normand Grimard	1925–2017	PC	QC	27 September 1990	16 June 2000	Mulroney	Retirement	
Allister Grosart	1906–1984	PC	ON	24 September 1962	13 December 1981	Diefenbaker	Voluntary retirement	Y
Joseph-Philippe Guay	1915–2001	L	MB	23 March 1978	4 October 1990	Trudeau, P.	Retirement	
Jean-Baptiste Guevremont	1826–1896	C	QC	23 October 1867	14 June 1896	Royal proclamation	Resignation	Y
Lenard Gustafson	1933–2022	C	SK	26 May 1993	10 November 2008	Mulroney	Retirement	
