= List of members of the Senate of Canada (Z) =

Senator	Lifespan	Party	Prov.	Entered	Left	Appointed by	Left due to
Mohammad Al Zaibak	1951–present		ON	28 January 2024	—	Trudeau, J.	—
Rod Zimmer	1942–2016	L	MB	2 August 2005	2 August 2013	Martin	Resignation
