= List of members of the Senate of Canada (I) =

Senator	Lifespan	Party	Prov.	Entered	Left	Appointed by	Left due to	For life?
Tony Ince	1957–present		NS	7 March 2025	—	Trudeau, J.	—	
Florence Elsie Inman	1891–1986	L	PE	28 July 1955	31 May 1986	St. Laurent	Death	Y
Olive Lillian Irvine	1895–1969	PC	MB	14 January 1960	1 November 1969	Diefenbaker	Death	Y
Gordon Benjamin Isnor	1885–1973	L	NS	2 May 1950	17 March 1973	St. Laurent	Death	Y
