= List of members of the Senate of Canada (J) =

Senator	Lifespan	Party	Prov.	Entered	Left	Appointed by	Left due to	For life?
Mobina Jaffer	1949–present	L	BC	13 June 2001	19 August 2024	Chrétien	Retirement	
Robert Jaffray	1832–1914	L	ON	8 March 1906	16 December 1914	Laurier	Death	Y
Duncan Jessiman	1923–2006	PC	MB	26 May 1993	5 June 1998	Mulroney	Retirement	
Mariana Beauchamp Jodoin	1881–1980	L	QC	19 May 1953	1 June 1966	St. Laurent	Voluntary retirement	Y
Janis Johnson	1946–present	C	MB	27 September 1990	27 September 2016	Mulroney	Resignation	
John Frederick Johnston	1876–1948	L	SK	5 October 1943	9 May 1948	King	Death	Y
Archibald Johnstone	1924–2014	L	PE	6 March 1998	12 June 1999	Chrétien	Retirement	
George Burpee Jones	1866–1950	C	NB	20 July 1935	27 April 1950	Bennett	Death	Y
John Walter Jones	1878–1954	L	PE	19 May 1953	31 March 1954	St. Laurent	Death	Y
Lyman Melvin Jones	1843–1917	L	ON	21 January 1901	15 April 1917	Laurier	Death	Y
Serge Joyal	1945–present	L	QC	26 November 1997	31 January 2020	Chrétien	Retirement	
