= List of members of the Senate of Canada (R) =

Senator	Lifespan	Party	Prov.	Entered	Left	Appointed by	Left due to	For life?
Joseph Hormisdas Rainville	1875–1942	C	QC	6 October 1932	14 April 1942	Bennett	Death	Y
James Palmer Rankin	1855–1934	L	ON	9 September 1925	15 June 1934	King	Death	Y
Nelson Rattenbury	1907–1973	L	NB	14 February 1964	27 May 1973	Pearson	Death	Y
Valentine Ratz	1848–1924	L	ON	18 January 1909	1 March 1924	Laurier	Death	Y
Mohamed-Iqbal Ravalia	1957–present		NL	1 June 2018	—	Trudeau, J.	—	
Donat Raymond	1880–1963	L	QC	20 December 1926	5 June 1963	King	Death	Y
Robert Read	1814–1896	C	ON	24 February 1871	29 June 1896	Macdonald	Death	Y
David Reesor	1823–1902	L	ON	23 October 1867	1 January 1901	Royal proclamation	Resignation	Y
James Reid	1839–1904	LC	BC	8 October 1888	3 May 1904	Macdonald	Death	Y
John Dowsley Reid	1859–1929	C	ON	22 September 1921	26 August 1929	Meighen	Death	Y
Thomas Reid	1886–1968	L	BC	7 September 1949	14 October 1967	St. Laurent	Resignation	Y
Louis Renaud	1818–1878	C	QC	23 October 1867	1 October 1873	Royal proclamation	Resignation	Y
Edgar Nelson Rhodes	1877–1942	C	NS	20 July 1935	15 March 1942	Bennett	Death	Y
David Adams Richards	1950–present	C	NB	30 August 2017	17 October 2025	Trudeau, J.	—	Y
Henry Westman Richardson	1855–1918	C	ON	20 January 1917	27 October 1918	Borden	Death	Y
Maurice Riel	1922–2007	L	QC	5 October 1973	3 April 1997	Trudeau, P.	Retirement	
Daniel Aloysius Riley	1916–1984	L	NB	21 December 1973	13 September 1984	Trudeau, P.	Death	
Daniel Edward Riley	1860–1948	L	AB	25 June 1926	27 April 1948	King	Death	Y
George Riley	1843–1916	L	BC	22 March 1906	19 January 1916	Laurier	Death	Y
Pierrette Ringuette	1955–present	L→NA	NB	12 December 2002	—	Chrétien	—	
John William Ritchie	1808–1890	C	NS	23 October 1867	28 September 1870	Royal proclamation	Resignation	Y
Michel Rivard	1941–present	C	QC	22 December 2008	7 August 2016	Harper	Retirement	
Jean-Claude Rivest	1943–present	I	QC	11 March 1993	31 January 2015	Mulroney	Resignation	
Pietro Rizzuto	1934–1997	L	QC	23 December 1976	3 August 1997	Trudeau, P.	Death	
Fernand Roberge	1940–2026	PC	QC	26 May 1993	19 July 2000	Mulroney	Resignation	
Brenda Robertson	1929–2020	C	NB	21 December 1984	23 May 2004	Mulroney	Retirement	
Gideon Robertson	1874–1933	C	ON	20 January 1917	5 August 1933	Borden	Death	Y
James Edwin Robertson	1840–1915	L	PE	7 February 1902	13 April 1915	Laurier	Resignation	Y
John Robertson	1799–1876	L	NB	23 October 1867	1 January 1876	Royal proclamation	Death	Y
John Alexander Robertson	1913–1965	PC	ON	29 November 1962	19 February 1965	Diefenbaker	Death	Y
Wishart McLea Robertson	1891–1967	L	NS	19 February 1943	24 December 1965	King	Resignation	Y
Fernand Robichaud	1939–present	L	NB	23 September 1997	2 December 2014	Chrétien	Retirement	
Hédard Robichaud	1911–1999	L	NB	28 June 1968	8 October 1971	Trudeau, P.	Resignation	
Louis Robichaud	1925–2005	L	NB	21 December 1973	21 October 2000	Trudeau, P.	Retirement	
Jean-Louis Philippe Robicheau	1874–1948	C	NS	20 July 1935	1 March 1948	Bennett	Death	Y
Brewer Waugh Robinson	1891–1949	L	PE	19 April 1945	20 January 1949	King	Death	Y
Clifford William Robinson	1866–1944	L	NB	5 May 1924	27 July 1944	King	Death	Y
Mary Robinson	1970–present		PE	22 January 2024	—	Trudeau, J.	—	
Louis Robitaille	1836–1888	C	QC	8 February 1883	28 December 1884	Macdonald	Resignation	Y
Théodore Robitaille	1834–1897	C	QC	29 January 1885	17 August 1897	Macdonald	Death	Y
Dufferin Roblin	1917–2010	PC	MB	23 March 1978	17 June 1992	Trudeau, P.	Retirement	
Douglas Roche	1929–present	I	AB	17 September 1998	14 June 2004	Chrétien	Retirement	
William Roche	1842–1925	L	NS	12 January 1910	19 October 1925	Laurier	Death	Y
Charles-Séraphin Rodier Jr	1818–1890	C	QC	1 December 1888	26 January 1890	Macdonald	Death	Y
Arthur Roebuck	1878–1971	L	ON	18 April 1945	17 November 1971	King	Death	Y
Jean-Baptiste Rolland	1815–1888	C	QC	22 October 1887	22 March 1888	Macdonald	Death	Y
Bill Rompkey	1936–2017	L	NL	21 September 1995	13 May 2011	Chrétien	Retirement	
George Henry Ross	1878–1956	L	AB	1 December 1948	26 September 1956	St. Laurent	Death	Y
George William Ross	1841–1914	L	ON	15 January 1907	7 March 1914	Laurier	Death	Y
James Gibb Ross	1819–1888	C	QC	11 January 1884	1 October 1888	Macdonald	Death	Y
James Hamilton Ross	1856–1932	L	NT	30 September 1904	31 August 1905	Laurier	Death	Y
James Hamilton Ross	1856–1932	L	SK	1 September 1905	14 December 1932	Laurier	Death	Y
James W. Ross	1938–present	PC	NB	27 September 1990	25 May 1993	Mulroney	Resignation	
John Ross	1818–1871	C	ON	23 October 1867	31 January 1871	Royal proclamation	Death	Y
John Jones Ross	1831–1901	C	QC	12 April 1887	4 May 1901	Macdonald	Death	Y
Krista Ann Ross	1967–present		NB	31 October 2023	—	Trudeau, J.	—	
William Ross	1824–1912	L	NS	18 May 1905	17 March 1912	Laurier	Death	Y
William Benjamin Ross	1855–1929	C	NS	20 November 1912	10 January 1929	Borden	Death	Y
Eileen Rossiter	1929–2007	PC	PE	17 November 1986	14 July 2004	Mulroney	Retirement	
Yvette Boucher Rousseau	1917–1988	L	QC	27 March 1979	17 March 1988	Trudeau, P.	Death	
Jean-Louis Roux	1923–2013	L	QC	31 August 1994	8 August 1996	Chrétien	Resignation	
Frederick William Rowe	1912–1994	L	NL	9 December 1971	28 September 1987	Trudeau, P.	Retirement	
Philippe Roy	1868–1948	L	AB	8 March 1906	21 April 1911	Laurier	Resignation	Y
Calvin Ruck	1925–2004	L	NS	11 June 1998	4 September 2000	Chrétien	Retirement	
Bob Runciman	1942–present	C	ON	29 January 2010	10 August 2017	Harper	Retirement	
Nancy Ruth	1942–present	C	ON	24 March 2005	6 January 2017	Martin	Retirement	
Thomas Ryan	1804–1889	LC	QC	23 October 1867	25 May 1889	Royal proclamation	Death	Y
