= List of members of the Senate of Canada (Y) =

Senator	Lifespan	Party	Prov.	Entered	Left	Appointed by	Left due to	For life?
John Yeo	1837–1924	L	PE	19 November 1898	14 December 1924	Laurier	Death	Y
Suze Youance	1970–present		QC	25 September 2024	—	Trudeau, J.	—	
Finlay McNaughton Young	1852–1916	L	MB	30 January 1900	15 February 1916	Laurier	Death	Y
Hassan Yussuff	1957–present		ON	22 June 2021	—	Trudeau, J.	—	
Paul Yuzyk	1913–1986	PC	MB	4 February 1963	9 July 1986	Diefenbaker	Death	Y
