= Louis-Joseph Forget =

Canadian businessman and politician (1853-1911)

The Honourable Louis-Joseph Forget
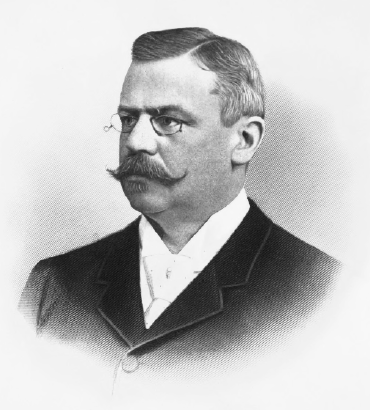

Senator for Saurel, Quebec
- In office June 15, 1896 – April 7, 1911
- Appointed by: Charles Tupper
- Preceded by: Jean-Baptiste Guévremont
- Succeeded by: Joseph-Marcellin Wilson

Personal details
- Born: March 11, 1853 Terrebonne, Canada East
- Died: April 7, 1911 (aged 58) Nice, France
- Party: Conservative
- Occupation: Banker, stockbroker

Louis-Joseph Forget (March 11, 1853 – April 7, 1911) was a Canadian businessman and politician.

== Life and career ==
Born in Terrebonne, Canada East, he was a stockbroker and then founded his own brokerage firm, L. J. Forget et Compagnie, in 1876. One of the wealthiest French Canadians in Montreal, he was chairman of the Montreal Stock Exchange in 1895 and 1896. He was president of the Montreal Street Railway Company and helped the company switch from horse cars to electric tramways. In 1904, he was the first French Canadian to be appointed to the board of directors of the Canadian Pacific Railway.

His nephew Rodolphe Forget joined his company and became one of the most important businessmen in the Province of Quebec and an elected member of the House of Commons of Canada.

Louis-Joseph Forget was appointed to the Senate of Canada representing the senatorial division of Sorel, Quebec in 1896. A Conservative, he served until his death.

His great-niece is Thérèse Forget Casgrain, a feminist, reformer, politician and senator. His home still survives today in Montreal's Golden Square Mile.

He died in Nice, France in 1911 and is buried in the Notre Dame des Neiges Cemetery.
