= Joseph-Marcellin Wilson =

Canadian politician

The Honourable Joseph-Marcellin Wilson

Senator for Saurel, Quebec
- In office May 3, 1911 – February 1940
- Appointed by: Wilfrid Laurier
- Preceded by: Louis-Joseph Forget
- Succeeded by: Athanase David

Personal details
- Born: November 26, 1859 Île Bizard, Canada East
- Died: September 10, 1940 (aged 80)
- Party: Liberal
- Occupation: Merchant

Joseph-Marcellin Wilson (November 26, 1859 – September 10, 1940) was a Canadian merchant and senator.

Born in Île Bizard, Canada East, he was summoned to the Canadian Senate in 1911. A Liberal, he represented the senatorial division of Saurel, Quebec. He resigned in February 1940. He died in 1940 and is buried in Notre-Dame-des-Neiges Cemetery.
