= Clive Pringle =

Canadian politician

Roderick Harold Clive Pringle (January 8, 1871 – May 2, 1920) was a Canadian Senator and lawyer.

Pringle was born in Grafton, Ontario and was educated at Trinity College School in Port Hope, Ontario. He earned a Bachelor of Arts degree from what was then Trinity University in Toronto and was called to the bar in Ontario in 1894. In 1898, he was called to the bar of British Columbia and established a law practice in Greenwood, British Columbia. In 1903, he relocated to Ottawa, Ontario where he continued his law practice.

He was appointed to the Senate of Canada by Sir Robert Borden in 1917 and sat as a Conservative representative for Ontario until his death in 1920, at the age of 49, due to a heart condition following a lengthy illness. He represented the Senatorial division of Cobourg, Ontario.
