= Thomas D'Arcy Leonard =

Canadian politician

Thomas D'Arcy Leonard (April 29, 1895 – May 25, 1977) was a Canadian Senator and corporate executive.

A lawyer by profession, Leonard was called to the bar in 1918. In the 1930s, he became solicitor for the Canada Permanent and Canada Permanent Trust as well as legal counsel for Dominion Mortgage and Investment and the Trust Companies Association of Ontario.

From 1951 to 1958, he served as president and general manager of Canada Permanent Trust and Continental Life Insurance and Triarch Corporation.

He was president of the National War Finance Committee during World War II and was also president of the Toronto Community Chest on several occasions.

Leonard was appointed to the Senate of Canada in 1955 by Louis St. Laurent. He sat in the body as a Liberal until April 29, 1970, when he voluntarily retired at the age of 75.

In the Senate, Leonard served as chairman of the Standing Committee on Finance and the Standing Committee on Transport and Communications in the mid to late 1960s.

After retiring from the Upper House he served as chairman of St. Michael's Hospital's building fund campaign.
