= Robert Peterson (Canadian politician) =

Canadian politician (1937–2020)

The Honourable Robert W. Peterson
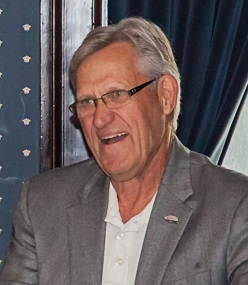

Canadian Senator from Saskatchewan
- In office 24 March 2005 – 19 October 2012
- Appointed by: Paul Martin

Personal details
- Born: October 19, 1937 Rose Valley, Saskatchewan, Canada
- Died: November 4, 2020 (aged 83) Regina, Saskatchewan, Canada
- Party: Liberal

Robert W. Peterson (19 October 1937 – 4 November 2020) was a Canadian politician. He served as a Liberal member of the Senate of Canada from Saskatchewan. He was appointed to the Senate by Prime Minister Paul Martin on March 24, 2005.

== Background ==
Peterson was an entrepreneur, professional engineer and community activist. He was the chief operating officer of Denro Holdings Ltd, and sat on the board of directors for General Properties Ltd and Cameco Corporation, a position he has held since 1994.

Peterson received a Bachelor of Science degree in Civil Engineering from the University of Saskatchewan.

Peterson died on 4 November 2020 in Regina.
