= Isobel Finnerty =

Canadian politician

Canadian Senator from Ontario
- In office September 2, 1999 – July 15, 2005

Personal details
- Born: Isobel Church; July 15, 1930 Timmins, Ontario, Canada
- Died: October 3, 2016 (aged 86) Iroquois Falls, Ontario, Canada
- Party: Liberal
- Spouse: Les Finnerty
- Profession: Medical secretary, political activist

Isobel Finnerty (née Church; July 15, 1930 – October 3, 2016) was a Canadian Senator. She was appointed to the Senate in 1999 by Jean Chrétien, and was a member of the Liberal Party. Finnerty retired from the Senate on July 15, 2005 upon reaching the chamber's mandatory retirement age of 75.

== Background ==
Before being appointed to the Senate, Finnerty was a medical secretary and community organizer. At the age of 19, she was appointed to the Timmins Parks and Recreation Commission, where she served as the only woman for over 20 years. While a resident of Timmins, she managed numerous municipal, provincial and federal campaigns. She served as executive director of the Liberal Party of Canada's Ontario wing in the late 1970s. In the early 1980s, she served as executive assistant to John Munro, Minister of Indian and Northern Affairs, and later managed his national leadership campaign in 1984. She also managed Greg Sorbara's 1992 campaign for the leadership of the Ontario Liberal Party, and played a leading role in Jean Chrétien's 1990 campaign for the leadership of the Liberal Party of Canada. She subsequently served as the Ontario campaign director for the Liberal Party in its victorious 1993 general election campaign.

In the Senate, Finnerty served on the following committees:

- Standing Committee on Agriculture and Forestry
- Standing Committee on Banking, Trade and Commerce
- Standing Committee on Energy, the Environment and Natural Resources
- Standing Committee on Foreign Affairs and International Trade
- Standing Committee on Human Rights
- Standing Committee on Legal and Constitutional Affairs
- Standing Committee on National Finance (as Vice-chair for two sessions)
- Standing Committee on Rules, Procedures and the Rights of Parliament
- Standing Committee on Social Affairs, Science and Technology
- Standing Committee on Transport and Communications

Finnerty died, aged 86, on October 3, 2016, at the Anson General Hospital in Iroquois Falls, Ontario.
