= Rod Zimmer =

Canadian politician

The Honourable Rod Zimmer

Canadian Senator from Manitoba
- In office 2 August 2005 – 2 August 2013
- Appointed by: Paul Martin
- Succeeded by: Murray Sinclair

Personal details
- Born: Rodney Anthony Allan Zimmer; 19 December 1942 Kuroki, Saskatchewan, Canada
- Died: 7 June 2016 (aged 73) Ottawa, Ontario, Canada
- Party: Liberal
- Spouse: Maygan Sensenberger (m. 2011)
- Education: University of Saskatchewan (BCom)

Rodney Anthony Allan Zimmer (19 December 1942 – 7 June 2016) was a Canadian politician, businessman, and philanthropist. He was also a significant fundraiser for the Liberal Party of Canada. He resigned suddenly from the Senate of Canada due to ill health on 2 August 2013.

== Early life ==
Born in Kuroki, Saskatchewan, he received a Bachelor of Commerce degree from the University of Saskatchewan in 1973.

== Business career ==
From 1979 to 1983, he was Vice President of Corporate Communications for CanWest Capital Corporation. He was then Director of Marketing and Communications for the Manitoba Lotteries Foundation (1985–1993). From 1989 to 1991, he was president of the Royal Winnipeg Ballet and from 1981 to 1993 he was a member of the board of directors for the Winnipeg Blue Bombers. He served as Vice President for the Festivals for the Pan American Games Society Inc. from 1995 to 1998. Before being appointed to the Senate, he was the President of The Gatehouse Corporation, a position he has held since 1993.

== Political career ==
From 1968 to 1971, Zimmer was an assistant to Cyril MacDonald, the Liberal Minister of Welfare in Saskatchewan, for most of the 1970s he was an assistant to James Richardson, the Minister of Defence. He was the Manitoba chair for the federal Liberal campaign in 1980.

In 1999, Zimmer was reportedly among the final two candidates for the posting of Lieutenant Governor of Manitoba. Prime Minister Jean Chrétien chose the other finalist, Peter Liba.

Zimmer was a member of the fundraising committee for Paul Martin’s leadership campaign in 2003 and revenue chair for the Liberal Party of Canada in Manitoba from 2004 to 2006. After Martin’s resignation, he helped raise funds for Ken Dryden’s leadership campaign.

He was appointed to the Senate of Canada on the recommendation of Prime Minister Paul Martin on 2 August 2005. He officially resigned exactly eight years later in 2013. Auditor General Michael Ferguson determined in 2015 that Zimmer had inappropriately claimed $176,012 in expenses which were not repaid before his death.

== Personal life ==
He married Maygan Sensenberger (born 15 April 1989) on 27 August 2011, in Ottawa, Ontario. During an 23 August 2012 flight, Zimmer and Sensenberger had an argument that required the flight crew to intervene. Sensenberger was arrested and charged with causing a disturbance and uttering threats against Zimmer, as well as endangering an aircraft which was later dropped. A court order forbade Zimmer and Sensenberger from communicating in person, restricting them to only phone and Internet, including Skype. Sensenberger pleaded guilty to causing a disturbance on a flight and was given a 12-month suspended sentence with probation and must seek counselling and an addiction assessment. The charge of uttering threats against Zimmer was withdrawn.

Zimmer suffered ill health in 2013 spending three weeks in hospital with pneumonia during the spring and then continuing to go in and out of hospital with respiratory complaints. He reportedly informed Liberal leader Justin Trudeau in July of his intention to resign due to his health and submitted a resignation letter to the Governor General of Canada on 2 August 2013, the eighth anniversary of his appointment to the Senate, with his resignation taking immediate effect. He was 70 at the time of his departure from the upper house. He died from cancer on 7 June 2016.
