= Richard Kroft =

Canadian lawyer, businessman, and politician

The Honourable Richard Henry Kroft CM

Canadian Senator from Manitoba
- In office 1998–2004
- Appointed by: Jean Chrétien

Personal details
- Born: May 22, 1938 (age 88) Winnipeg, Manitoba, Canada
- Party: Liberal
- Children: 3
- Education: University of Manitoba (BA, LLB)

Richard Henry Kroft, CM (born May 22, 1938) is a Canadian lawyer, businessman, and politician.

== Early life and career ==
Born in Winnipeg, Manitoba, he received a Bachelor of Arts in Economics and Political Science from the University of Manitoba in 1959 and an LL.B in 1963.

He was Assistant Secretary and Treasurer of McCabe Grain Co. Ltd. Next, he became Special Assistant to the Minister of Finance, and Executive Assistant to the Secretary of State for External Affairs, Mitchell Sharp. After, in 1969, he became President of Tryton Investment Co. Ltd.

== Political career ==
He was summoned to the Senate by recommendation of Jean Chrétien in 1998, and resigned in 2004. He was Chair of the Standing Committee on Internal Economy, Budgets and Administration, and Chair of the Standing Senate Committee on Banking, Trade and Commerce.

== Personal life ==
He is married to Hillaine Jacob and has three children, Elizabeth, Steven, and Gordon.

== Honours ==
In 1997, he was made a Member of the Order of Canada. In 2008, he was awarded an honorary Doctor of Laws degree from the University of Manitoba.
