= Senator for life =

Senate member who has life tenure

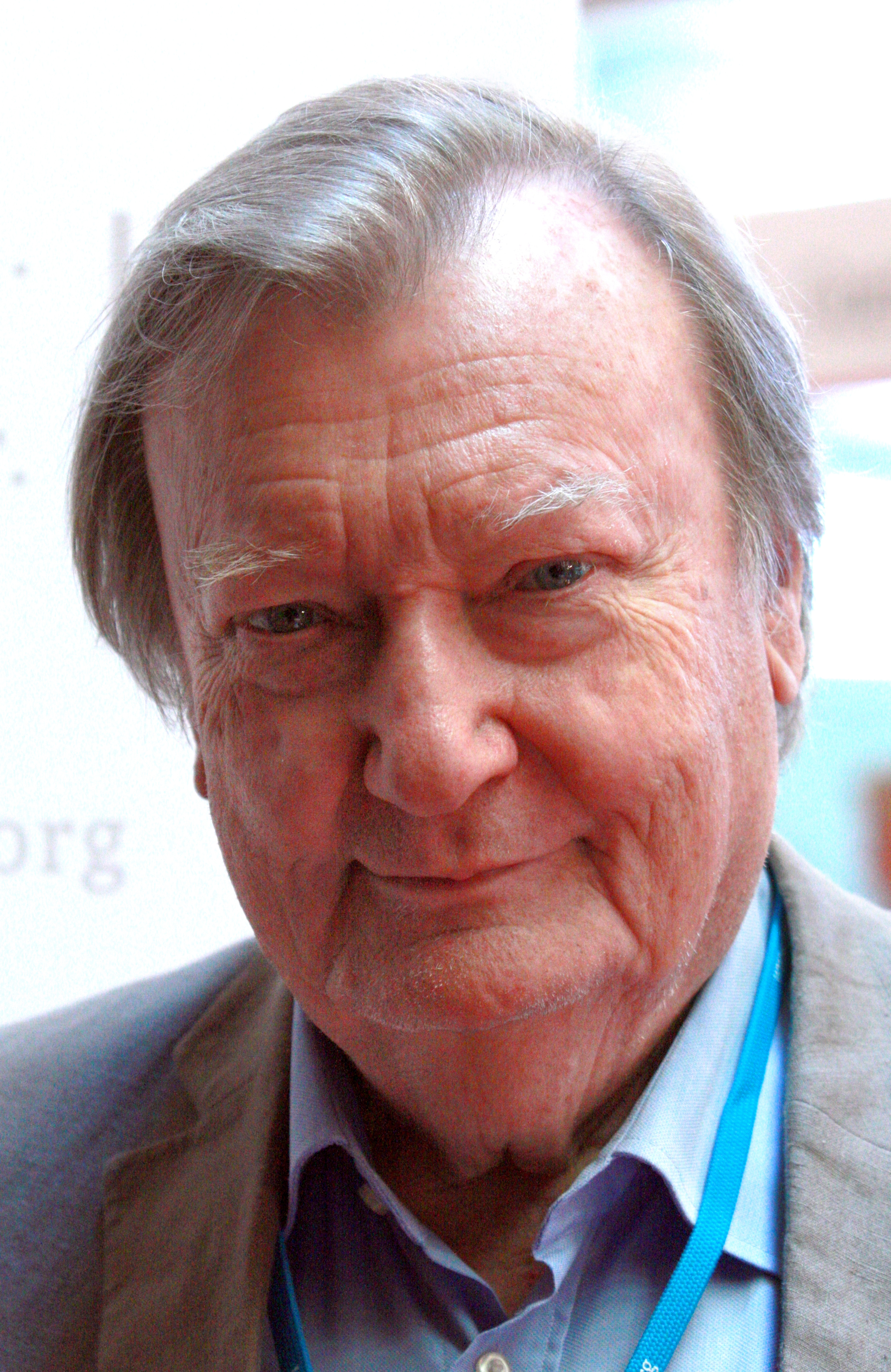
Carlo Rubbia, senator for life in the Italian Senate since 2013 and Nobel Prize in Physics in 1984.

A senator for life is a member of the senate or equivalent upper chamber of a legislature who has life tenure. As of 2023, five Italian senators out of 205, one Congolese senator out of 109, and all members of the British House of Lords (apart from the 26 Lords Spiritual who are expected to retire at the age of 70) have lifetime tenure (although Lords can choose to resign or retire or can be expelled in cases of misconduct). Several South American countries once granted lifetime membership to former presidents but have since abolished the practice.

== Democratic Republic of the Congo ==
The 2006 constitution of the Democratic Republic of the Congo grants lifetime membership in the Senate to former presidents of the Republic. As of 2025, Joseph Kabila is the only senator for life after serving as president from 2001 to 2019.

The 1964 Congolese constitution also provided for life membership in the Senate for former presidents.

== Italy ==
In Italy, a senator for life (Italian: senatore a vita) is a member of the Italian Senate appointed by the President "for outstanding patriotic merits in the social, scientific, artistic or literary field". There may be up to five appointed senators for life at the same time. Former presidents are ex officio senators for life. Currently there are five senators for life (five appointed).

== Paraguay ==
Former presidents of the Republic, except for those who were impeached from office, or those ascended to presidency through line of succession, are granted the speaking-but-non-voting position of senator for life.

== Russia ==
The lifetime senatorship appeared in the Constitution of Russia as a result of the constitutional reform in 2020. According to the new version of the Constitution, the president has the right to appoint 30 senators for services to the country in the sphere of state and public activity, 7 of whom can be appointed for life. In addition, former presidents (except for those who were impeached from office) become senators for life, but have the right to refuse this office. This was widely seen as a preparation for a future power transition.

== Rwanda ==
The Rwandan Constitution permits former presidents of the country to become members of the Senate if they wish, by submitting a request to the Supreme Court.

== Former systems ==
=== Burundi ===
In Burundi, former presidents of the Republic served in the Senate for life until 2018 constitutional reform.

=== Canada ===
In a manner reminiscent of the British House of Lords, members of the Canadian Senate were appointed for life. Since the Constitution Act, 1965, however, senators must retire upon reaching the age of 75. Though senators appointed before the amendment were grandfathered in by the legislation, there are no longer any lifetime senators present in the Canadian Senate. Orville Howard Phillips, the last senator for life, resigned his seat in 1999.

=== France ===
In France, during the Third Republic, the Senate was composed of 300 members, 75 of which were inamovible ("unremovable"). Introduced in 1875, the status was abolished for new senators in 1884, but maintained for those already in office. Émile Deshayes de Marcère, the last surviving sénateur inamovible, died in 1918. Overall there had been 116 lifetime senators.

In 2005, there was questioning about the status of former presidents of the Republic. According to the constitution of the Fifth Republic, former presidents are de jure members of the Constitutional Council, which poses a problem of possible partiality. Some members of Parliament and commentators suggested that it should be replaced by a life membership in the Senate. This proposal was, however, not enacted.

=== Romania ===
The 1923 Constitution instituted the membership by right (senator de drept) in the Senate for:

- the heir-apparent or heir-presumptive to the throne
- Metropolitan bishops and diocesan bishops of the Orthodox and Greek-Catholic churches
- heads of state-recognised religious bodies
- the president of the Romanian Academy
- former presidents of the Council of Ministers
- former ministers with at least six years’ seniority
- former presidents of either legislative chamber who held this function for at least eight ordinary sessions
- former senators and deputies elected to at least ten legislatures, irrespective of their duration
- former presidents of the High Court of Cassation and Justice
- reserve and retired generals
- former presidents of the National Assemblies at Chişinău, Cernăuţi and Alba Iulia, which proclaimed their respective provinces' union with Romania in 1918.

The membership by right was maintained under the 1938 Constitution and it was abolished together with the Senate on July 15, 1946, by the Communist Party-dominated government of Petru Groza.

Although the current constitution of Romania re-established the bicameral Parliament in 1991, it did not reinstate the office of senator by right.

=== Rome ===
The Roman Senate, which existed in various forms between the founding of the city of Rome in 753 BC and the fall of the Byzantine Empire in the 15th century AD, was composed of senators which served for life, the number of whom fluctuated from 100 to thousands of men.

=== South and Central America ===
The constitutions of a number of countries in South America have granted former presidents the right to be senator for life (senador vitalicio), possibly recalling the entirely unelected Senate of Simón Bolívar's theory. Most of these countries have since excised these provisions as they are increasingly seen as antidemocratic. The Constitution of Paraguay still has such a provision. Former presidents are permitted to speak but not vote.

- In Venezuela, lifetime Senate seats existed from 1961 to 1999. The former presidents who held this position were: Rómulo Betancourt (1964–1981), Raúl Leoni (1969–1972), Rafael Caldera (1974–1994, 1999), Carlos Andrés Pérez (1979–1989, 1994–1996), Luis Herrera Campins (1984–1999) and Jaime Lusinchi (1989–1999). The Venezuelan Senate was abolished with the 1999 constitution.
- In Peru, the practice was extant from 1979 to 1993. Francisco Morales Bermúdez, Fernando Belaúnde Terry and Alan García Pérez were the only lifetime senators until the abolition of the senate in 1993 and the introduction of a unicameral parliament. Although a constitutional reform approved in 2024 re-established the bicameralism and the Senate, it did not reinstate the office of senator for life, due to the unpopularity of that topic.
- In Chile, under the 1980 Constitution, two ex-presidents have become senators-for-life: Augusto Pinochet Ugarte (1998–2002) and Eduardo Frei Ruiz-Tagle (2000–2006). Pinochet's parliamentary immunity protected him from prosecution for human rights violations until the Chilean Supreme Court revoked it in 2000. The provision was abolished by constitutional reforms in 2005.
- In Nicaragua, the 1974 Constitution granted lifetime membership in that country's Senate to former presidents of the Republic.

==== Brazil ====
The senators of the Empire of Brazil (1826–1889) were appointed for life by the Emperor from a list of three, indirectly elected, candidates for each constituency. There were about 250 senators of the Empire of Brazil.

=== Somalia ===
While the 1960 constitution of the Somali Republic (1960–1969) did not provide for a senate (the legislature, known as the National Assembly, was unicameral), it did grant lifetime membership in the legislature to ex-presidents of the Republic. Aden Adde was the only person eligible to hold this position.

=== United States ===
During the Constitutional Convention of 1787, New York delegate Alexander Hamilton proposed that all members of the U.S. Senate, which was at time appointed by state legislatures and intended to check the power of the popularly elected House of Representatives, be appointed for life as a safeguard against "amazing violence and turbulence of the democratic spirit." His views did not prevail, and the final U.S. Constitution specified six-year terms for senators.

Larry J. Sabato, a political scientist at the University of Virginia, proposed establishing lifetime Senate appointments for former presidents and former vice presidents as part of a broad set of political proposals in his 2007 book, A More Perfect Constitution.

== See also ==
- Lords Spiritual
- Lords Temporal
- President for life
- Term limits
- List of senators for life in Italy
