= Charles-Eugène Panet =

Canadian politician

The Honourable Charles-Eugène Panet
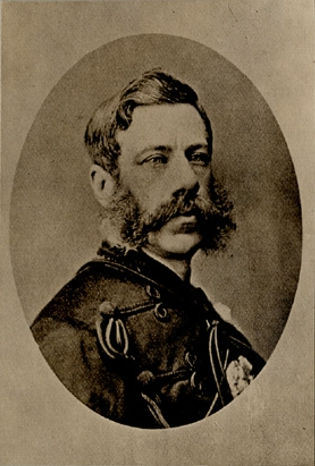

Senator for La Salle, Quebec
- In office March 27, 1874 – February 4, 1875
- Appointed by: Alexander Mackenzie
- Preceded by: Louis Panet
- Succeeded by: Hector Fabre

Personal details
- Born: November 27, 1829 Quebec City, Lower Canada
- Died: November 22, 1898 (aged 68)
- Party: Liberal
- Occupation: lawyer, Senator, soldier, deputy minister of militia and defence

Charles-Eugène Panet (November 27, 1829 – November 22, 1898) was a Canadian militia officer, civil servant, and senator who represented Quebec as a member of the Liberal Party. He was appointed on March 27, 1874 by Alexander Mackenzie. He served until his resignation on February 4, 1875.

== Education ==
He was born in Quebec on November 27, 1829. He was the son of The Hon. Philippe Panet, late Judge of the Court of Queen's Bench, Lower Canada. His mother, Luce Casgrain, was the daughter and co-heiress of Pierre Casgrain (1771-1828) J.P., Seigneur of La Bouteillerie. Panet was a nephew of politicians Louis Panet and Charles Panet. He was educated at the Quebec Seminary and at the Jesuit College in Georgetown, Quebec. He studied law in Quebec with his relation The Hon. Jean-Thomas Taschereau, late of the Supreme Court of Canada. He was called to the Bar of Lower Canada in 1854.

== Career ==
He practiced law for three years in Quebec (1854–1857). He was coroner for the City and District of Quebec for fourteen years. He was a Lieutenant-Colonel of the 9th Voltigeurs de Québec (1869–80). In 1886, he was gazetted a Colonel in the Canadian Militia. In 1874 he was called to the Senate of Canada. In 1875, he resigned his seat in the Senate to accept the position of deputy minister of militia and defence, (1875–98). In 1888, he presented to Parliament a "Report upon the suppression of the rebellion in the North-West Territories and matters in connection therewith" Department of Militia and Defence.

He retained this position until shortly before his death at Ottawa on November 22, 1898.

== Family ==
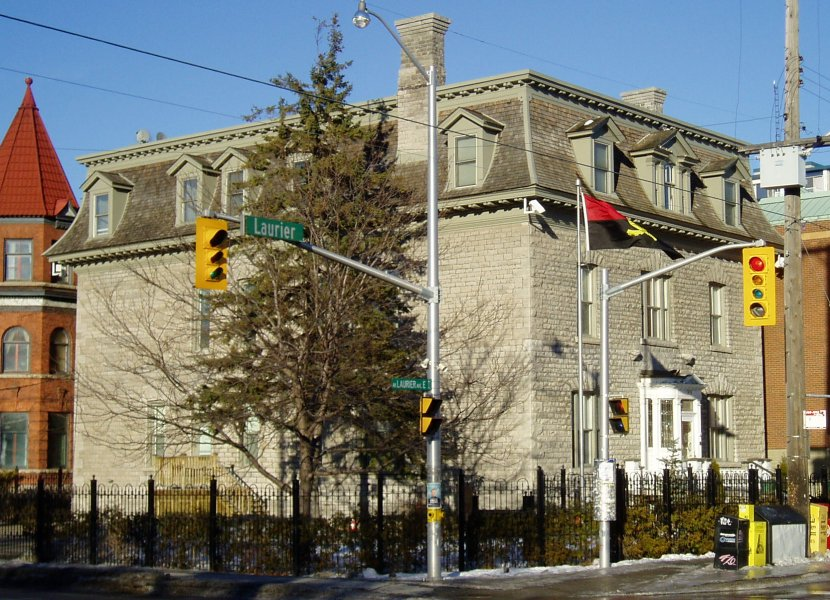
Panet House in Ottawa, Ontario

Panet was married three times and had sixteen children, some of whom died in infancy. Between 1876 and 1877, Panet built the Panet House in Ottawa, Ontario. In 1986, the Panet House became part of the King Edward Avenue Heritage Conservation District.

== Memorial ==
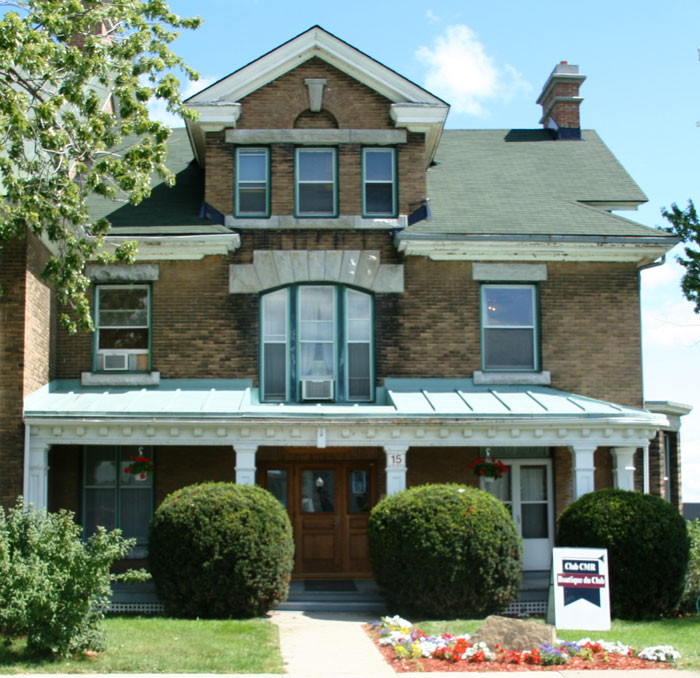
Panet House (1906) Royal Military College of Canada

The Panet House (1906) at the Royal Military College of Canada was named in his honour.
