= Charles Panet =

Canadian politician (1797–1877)

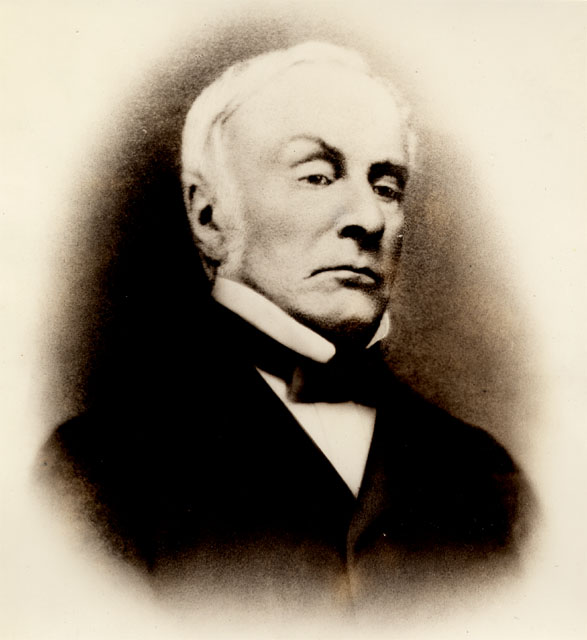
Charles Panet, c. 1870

Charles Panet (October 6, 1797 – October 15, 1877) was a lawyer and political figure in Quebec. He represented Quebec County in the Legislative Assembly of the Province of Canada from 1858 to 1861.

He was born in Quebec City, the son of Jean-Antoine Panet and Louise-Philippe Badelart, the daughter of Philippe-Louis-François Badelard. He was admitted to the Lower Canada bar in 1822 and set up practice in Quebec City. He was coroner for Quebec district from 1831 to 1839. In 1855, he was named King's Counsel. In 1845, he married Frances O'Donnell. Panet served as lieutenant-colonel in the militia. In 1862, he was named curator for the judicial archives for Quebec district. He died in Quebec City at the age of 80.

His brother Phillippe served in the legislative assembly for Lower Canada and his brother Louis served in the Canadian senate.
