= Shefford (Province of Canada electoral district) =

Electoral district in former Province of Canada

Shefford Canada East
Province of Canada electoral district

Defunct pre-Confederation electoral district
- Legislature: Legislative Assembly of the Province of Canada
- District created: 1841
- District abolished: 1867
- First contested: 1841
- Last contested: 1863

Shefford was an electoral district of the Legislative Assembly of the Parliament of the Province of Canada, in Canada East, in the Eastern Townships. It was created in 1841, based on the previous electoral district of the same name for the Legislative Assembly of Lower Canada.

Shefford was represented by one member in the Legislative Assembly. It was abolished in 1867, upon the creation of Canada and the province of Quebec.

== Boundaries ==
Shefford was located to the south-east of Montreal, in the Eastern Townships (including areas now in the regional county municipalities of Brome-Missisquoi and La Haute-Yamaska).

The Union Act, 1840 merged the two provinces of Upper Canada and Lower Canada into the Province of Canada, with a single Parliament. The separate parliaments of Lower Canada and Upper Canada were abolished. The Union Act provided that the pre-existing electoral boundaries of Lower Canada and Upper Canada would continue to be used in the new Parliament, unless altered by the Union Act itself.

Shefford electoral district of Lower Canada was not altered by the Act, and therefore continued with the same boundaries which had been set by a statute of Lower Canada in 1829:

The County of Shefford shall contain the Townships of Ely, Stukely, Brome, Shefford, Roxton, Milton, Granby, and Farnham with the gores and augmentations of the said Townships.

== Members of the Legislative Assembly (1841–1867) ==
Shefford was a single-member constituency.

The following were the members of the Legislative Assembly for Shefford. The party affiliations are based on the biographies of individual members given by the National Assembly of Quebec, as well as votes in the Legislative Assembly. "Party" was a fluid concept, especially during the early years of the Province of Canada.

Parliament	Member	Years in Office	Party
1st Parliament; 1841–1844	Sewell Foster	1841–1847	Unionist; Tory
2nd Parliament; 1844–1847	Sewell Foster	1841–1847	"British" Tory
3rd Parliament; 1848–1851	Lewis Thomas Drummond (Note: Seat vacated on June 7, 1848, on appointment as Solicitor General for Lower Canada, an office of profit under the Crown; re-elected in by-election, July 11, 1848: Côté, Political Appointments and Elections in the Province of Canada, 1841 to 1860, p. 61, note (116).) (Note: Seat vacated on August 2, 1858, on appointment as Attorney General for Lower Canada, an office of profit under the Crown; defeated in by-election, September 14, 1858: Côté, Political Appointments and Elections in the Province of Canada, 1841 to 1860, p. 64, notes (223), (224).)	1848–1858	French-Canadian Group
4th Parliament; 1851–1854	Lewis Thomas Drummond	1848–1858	"English" Moderate
5th Parliament; 1854–1857	Lewis Thomas Drummond	1848–1858	English Ministerialist
6th Parliament; 1858–1861	Lewis Thomas Drummond	1848–1858	Liberal
6th Parliament; 1858–1861	Asa Belknap Foster (Note: Elected in by-election, September 14, 1858: Côté, Political Appointments and Elections in the Province of Canada, 1841 to 1860, p. 64, note (224).) (Note: Resigned seat, 1860: J.O. Côté, Political Appointments and Elections in the Province of Canada from 1841 to 1865, 2nd ed. (Ottawa: G.E. Desbarats, 1865), p. 114.)	1858–1860	Liberal-Conservative
7th Parliament; 1861–1863	Lucius Seth Huntington	1861–1867	Liberal
8th Parliament; 1863–1867	Lucius Seth Huntington	1861–1867	Anti-Confederation; Liberal

== Abolition ==
The district was abolished on July 1, 1867, when the British North America Act, 1867 came into force, creating Canada and splitting the Province of Canada into Quebec and Ontario. It was succeeded by electoral districts of the same name in the House of Commons of Canada and the Legislative Assembly of Quebec.

== See also ==
- List of elections in the Province of Canada
