= Louis Panet =

Canadian politician (1794–1884)

The Hon. Louis Panet
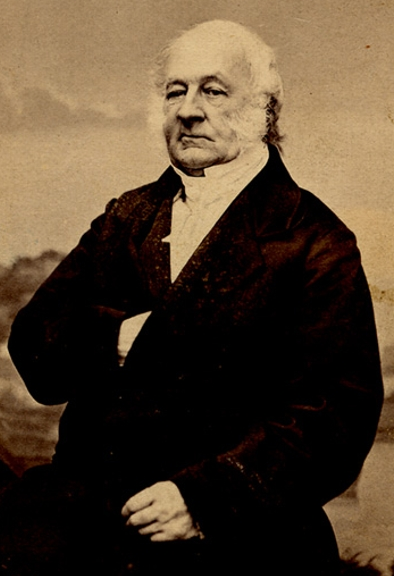

Senator for La Salle, Quebec
- In office 1871–1874
- Appointed by: John A. Macdonald
- Preceded by: Édouard-Louis-Antoine-Charles Juchereau Duchesnay
- Succeeded by: Charles-Eugène Panet

Member of the Legislative Council of Quebec for La Salle
- In office 1867–1884
- Succeeded by: Praxède Larue

Personal details
- Born: March 19, 1794 Quebec City, Lower Canada
- Died: May 15, 1884 (aged 90) Quebec City, Quebec
- Party: Conservative

Louis Panet (March 19, 1794 – May 15, 1884) was a notary and political figure in Quebec. He sat for La Salle division in the Senate of Canada from 1871 to 1874. Panet also represented La Salle in the Legislative Council of Quebec from 1867 to 1884.

He was born in Quebec City, the son of seigneur Jean-Antoine Panet and Louise-Philippe Badelart, who was the daughter of Philippe-Louis-François Badelard. Panet qualified as a notary in 1819 and set up practice in Quebec City. He was president of the Saint-Jean-Baptiste Society in Quebec City. In 1820, he married Marie-Louise Oliva. Panet served as lieutenant-colonel in the 1st Battalion of the Canadian Grenadier Guards. He was a member of the Executive Council for Lower Canada from 1837 to 1841 and served in the Legislative Council of the Province of Canada from 1852 to 1867. He resigned his seat in the Senate in 1874. Panet died in Quebec City at the age of 90.

His brother Philippe served in the legislative assembly for Lower Canada and his brother Charles served in the legislative assembly for the Province of Canada. His nephew Charles-Eugène Panet also served in the Canadian senate.
