= Michel Veillette =

Canadian politician

Member of the Canadian Parliament for Champlain
- In office 1979–1984
- Preceded by: René Matte
- Succeeded by: Michel Champagne

Personal details
- Born: 6 October 1939 (age 86) Saint-Maurice, Quebec, Canada
- Party: Liberal

Michel Veillette (born 6 October 1939) was a Liberal party member of the House of Commons of Canada. He was an agricultural technologist and manager by career.

He represented the Quebec riding of Champlain at which he was elected in 1979 and again in 1980. After serving in the 31st and 32nd Canadian Parliaments, he was defeated by Michel Champagne of the Progressive Conservative party in the 1984 election.

Veillette made another unsuccessful attempt to re-enter Parliament in the 1993 federal election, but earned fewer votes than Champagne who in turn lost his seat to Réjean Lefebvre of the Bloc Québécois.

== Electoral record ==
1979 Canadian federal election: Champlain
Party	Candidate	Votes
Liberal	Michel Veillette	22,256
Independent	René Matte	10,441
Progressive Conservative	Gérard Lamy	4,200
Social Credit	Claude L'Herault	2,796
New Democratic	Denis Tousignant	1,328
Rhinoceros	Gilles Leycuras	753
