= Jean-Claude Panet =

Jean-Claude Panet, (French pronunciation: [ʒɑ̃ klod panɛ]; December 1719? – February 28, 1778) was from Paris, France and came to Canada at 20 years of age as a soldier in the colonial regular troops. He arrived on a ship which was struck by an epidemic and many passengers and crew, including Bishop François-Louis de Pourroy de Lauberivière, died.

In 1743 his father obtained his discharge and subsequently an appointment as royal notary in the provost court of Quebec in 1744. He was to hold this position for 30 years while also pursuing other endeavours.

Panet was active in the legal community of Quebec during the Seven Years' War and evidently was a key figure in the days after the plains of Abraham and the articles of capitulation.

Panet was married and had 14 children, a number of whom were to make significant contributions of their own to Canada. Bernard-Claude Panet became archbishop of Quebec. Jean-Antoine Panet became a politician, speaker of the Lower Canada House of Assembly and an important political figure. Another son, Jacques Panet, was a parish priest of Notre-Dame-de-Bon-Secours. Three daughters became Ursulines and two had long service with the order.
