= Dalia Wood =

Canadian politician (1924–2013)

The Honourable Dalia Wood

Senator for Montarville, Quebec
- In office 1979–1999
- Appointed by: Pierre Trudeau
- Preceded by: John Ewasew
- Succeeded by: Sheila Finestone

Personal details
- Born: August 21, 1924 Montreal, Quebec, Canada
- Died: January 6, 2013 (aged 88)
- Party: Liberal

Dalia Wood (21 August 1924 – 6 January 2013) was a member of the Senate of Canada.

Born in Montreal, Quebec, she was the president of the Liberal Party of Canada in Quebec and the riding association of Mount Royal, Prime Minister Pierre Trudeau's riding. She was appointed to the senate on 26 March 1979 on the recommendation of Pierre Trudeau. She represented the senatorial division of Montarville, Quebec until her resignation on 31 January 1999.

Wood died on January 6, 2013.
