= Onésime Carignan =

Canadian politician

Member of the Canadian Parliament for Champlain
- In office 1891–1896
- Preceded by: Hippolyte Montplaisir
- Succeeded by: François Arthur Marcotte

Personal details
- Born: October 16, 1839 Champlain, Lower Canada
- Died: September 20, 1897 (aged 57)
- Party: Conservative
- Spouse: Aglaée Le Bel (m. 1864)

Onésime Carignan (October 16, 1839 – September 20, 1897) was a wholesale and retail grocer and political figure in Quebec. He represented Champlain in the House of Commons of Canada from 1891 to 1896 as a Conservative member.

He was born in Champlain, Quebec, the son of Joseph Carignan and Josephte Turcotte. In 1864, he married Aglaée Le Bel. Carignan served as a member of the town council for Trois-Rivières from 1876 to 1888.
