= Mark Robert Drouin =

Canadian politician and lawyer

The Honourable Mark Robert Drouin PC QC
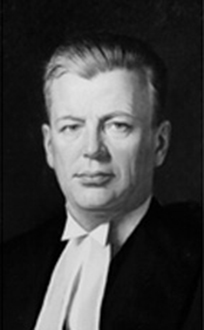

Speaker of the Senate of Canada
- In office October 4, 1957 – September 23, 1962
- Appointed by: John Diefenbaker
- Preceded by: Wishart McLea Robertson
- Succeeded by: George Stanley White

Senator for La Salle, Quebec
- In office 1957–1963
- Appointed by: John Diefenbaker
- Preceded by: Lucien Moraud
- Succeeded by: Azellus Denis

Personal details
- Born: October 24, 1903 Quebec City, Quebec, Canada
- Died: October 12, 1963 (aged 59)
- Party: Progressive Conservative

Mark Robert Drouin, PC QC (October 24, 1903 – October 12, 1963) was a Canadian politician and lawyer. Drouin served as Speaker of the Senate of Canada from 1957 until 1962.

Drouin was born in Quebec City and educated at the Séminaire de Québec and Université Laval. He trained as a lawyer and was called to the Quebec bar in 1926 ultimately becoming senior partner in the firm of Drouin, Drouin, Bernier and Vaillancourt. He became secretary of the Quebec bar in 1934.

He was also a hockey enthusiast and served as vice-president of Quebec's senior amateur hockey league for more than two decades. He was also director of the National School of Theatre and helped gain the 1967 World's Fair for Montreal (which became known as Expo 67).

Drouin ran as a Progressive Conservative candidate in the 1949 federal election against Prime Minister Louis St. Laurent in the riding of Quebec East but was defeated by St. Laurent by 18,000 votes. He also served as chairman of the Quebec Conservative Association in 1949, 1953 and 1957 and as first vice-president of the Progressive Conservative Party of Canada in 1955 and was the only French Canadian to support John Diefenbaker's candidacy to lead the Progressive Conservatives at their 1956 leadership convention.

The Conservatives took power following the 1957 federal election and Diefenbaker, as prime minister, had Drouin appointed to the Senate of Canada on October 4, 1957, and named him Speaker of the Senate despite his lack of parliamentary experience.

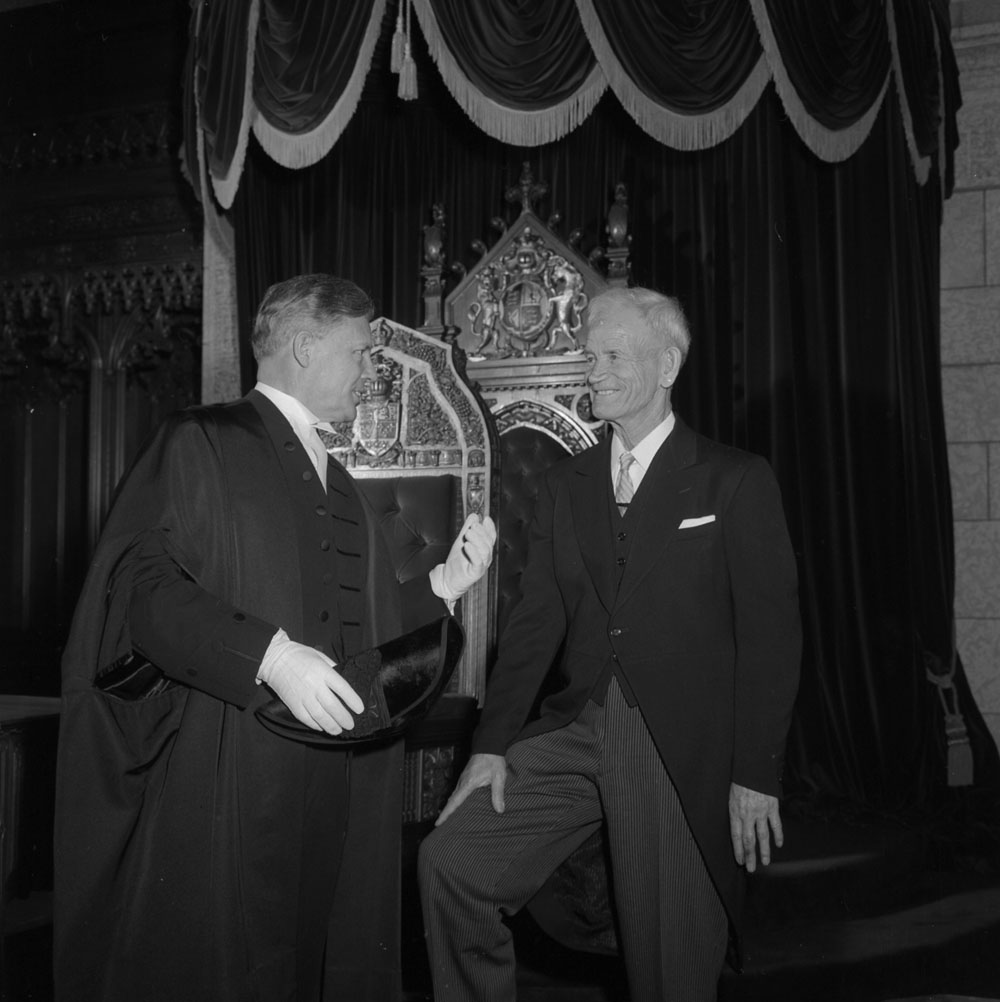
Drouin (left) with Senator James Gladstone (right), 1958

During his tenure he served as joint-president of the Commonwealth Parliamentary Association, chairman of the Canada-NATO Parliamentary Association and the chairman of the Canada-United States Interparliamentary Association.

Drouin retired as Speaker in 1962 and was appointed to the Privy Council. He died a year later.
