= Joseph Irenée Rochefort =

Canadian politician

Member of the Canadian Parliament for Champlain
- In office 1949–1958
- Preceded by: Hervé-Edgar Brunelle
- Succeeded by: Paul Lahaye

Personal details
- Born: July 9, 1910 Cap-de-la-Madeleine, Quebec, Canada
- Died: April 4, 1979 (aged 68) Joliette, Quebec, Canada
- Party: Liberal
- Spouse(s): Corinne Bourassa (m. 1 Sep 1941)

Joseph Irenée Rochefort (July 9, 1910 – April 4, 1979) was a Canadian politician and a Member of the House of Commons.

== Background ==
He was born on July 9, 1910, in Cap-de-la-Madeleine, Mauricie. He was a musician and a real estate agent.

== Political career ==
Rochefort ran as a Liberal candidate in the federal district of Champlain in 1949 and won. He was re-elected in 1953 and 1957.

He did not run for re-election in 1958 and was succeeded by Paul Lahaye of the Progressive Conservative Party.

== Honors ==
Rue Rochefort (Rochefort Street) in Cap-de-la-Madeleine was named to honor him.
