= Jean-Paul Matte =

Canadian politician

- Official 1966 portrait

Member of the Canadian Parliament for Champlain
- In office 1962–1968
- Preceded by: Paul Lahaye
- Succeeded by: René Matte

Personal details
- Born: November 18, 1914 Saint-Tite, Quebec
- Died: January 6, 1992 (aged 77)
- Party: Liberal

Jean-Paul Matte (November 18, 1914 – January 6, 1992) was a Canadian politician and a Member of the House of Commons.

== Background ==
He was born on November 18, 1914, in Saint-Tite, Mauricie and was a merchant and farmer.

== Political career ==
Matte ran as a Liberal candidate in the federal district of Champlain in 1962 and won. He was re-elected in 1963 and 1965.

However, he was defeated by Ralliement Créditiste candidate René Matte in 1968.

== Death ==
He died on January 6, 1992.
