= Arthur Lesieur Desaulniers =

Canadian politician

Member of the Canadian Parliament for Champlain
- In office 1917–1930
- Preceded by: Pierre Édouard Blondin
- Succeeded by: Jean-Louis Baribeau

Personal details
- Born: February 9, 1873 Louiseville, Quebec
- Died: July 16, 1954 (aged 81)
- Party: Liberal

Arthur Lesieur Desaulniers (February 9, 1873 – July 16, 1954) was a merchant and political figure in Quebec. He represented Champlain in the House of Commons of Canada from 1917 to 1930 as a Liberal.

He was born in Louiseville, Quebec, the son of Alexis Lesieur Desaulniers and Oliva Pichette. In 1896, he married Hélène Gariépy. He was mayor of Sainte-Anne-de-la-Pérade from 1913 to 1919 and was warden for Champlain County in 1917. Desaulniers was defeated by Jean-Louis Baribeau when he ran for reelection in 1930. He died in Sainte-Anne-de-la-Pérade at the age of 81.
