= Champlain (federal electoral district) =

Former federal electoral district in Quebec, Canada

Quebec electoral district

Defunct federal electoral district
- Legislature: House of Commons
- District created: 1867
- District abolished: 2003
- First contested: 1867
- Last contested: 2000

Champlain (French pronunciation: [ʃɑ̃plɛ̃]) was a federal electoral district in Quebec, Canada, that was represented in the House of Commons of Canada from 1867 to 2004.

It was created in 1867 as part of the British North America Act, 1867. It was abolished in 2003 when it was redistributed into the districts of Saint-Maurice—Champlain and Trois-Rivières.

== Members of Parliament ==
This riding elected the following members of Parliament:

Parliament	Years	Member	Party
Champlain
1st	1867–1872	John Jones Ross	Conservative
2nd	1872–1874	John Jones Ross	Conservative
3rd	1874–1878	Hippolyte Montplaisir	Liberal–Conservative
4th	1878–1882	Hippolyte Montplaisir	Liberal–Conservative
5th	1882–1887	Hippolyte Montplaisir	Liberal–Conservative
6th	1887–1891	Hippolyte Montplaisir	Liberal–Conservative
7th	1891–1896	Onésime Carignan	Conservative
8th	1896–1897	François-Arthur Marcotte	Conservative
8th	1897–1900	François-Arthur Marcotte	Conservative
9th	1900–1904	Jeffrey Alexandre Rousseau	Liberal
10th	1904–1908	Jeffrey Alexandre Rousseau	Liberal
11th	1908–1911	Pierre-Edouard Blondin	Conservative
12th	1911–1914	Pierre-Edouard Blondin	Conservative
12th	1914–1917	Pierre-Edouard Blondin	Conservative
13th	1917–1921	Arthur Lesieur Desaulniers	Opposition (Laurier Liberals)
14th	1921–1925	Arthur Lesieur Desaulniers	Liberal
15th	1925–1926	Arthur Lesieur Desaulniers	Liberal
16th	1926–1930	Arthur Lesieur Desaulniers	Liberal
17th	1930–1935	Jean-Louis Baribeau	Conservative
18th	1935–1940	Hervé-Edgar Brunelle	Liberal
19th	1940–1945	Hervé-Edgar Brunelle	Liberal
20th	1945–1949	Hervé-Edgar Brunelle	Liberal
21st	1949–1953	Joseph Irenée Rochefort	Liberal
22nd	1953–1957	Joseph Irenée Rochefort	Liberal
23rd	1957–1958	Joseph Irenée Rochefort	Liberal
24th	1958–1962	Paul Lahaye	Progressive Conservative
25th	1962–1963	Jean-Paul Matte	Liberal
26th	1963–1965	Jean-Paul Matte	Liberal
27th	1965–1968	Jean-Paul Matte	Liberal
28th	1968–1971	René Matte	Ralliement créditiste
28th	1971–1972	René Matte	Social Credit
29th	1972–1974	René Matte	Social Credit
30th	1974–1979	René Matte	Social Credit
31st	1979–1980	Michel Veillette	Liberal
32nd	1980–1984	Michel Veillette	Liberal
33rd	1984–1988	Michel Champagne	Progressive Conservative
34th	1988–1993	Michel Champagne	Progressive Conservative
35th	1993–1997	Réjean Lefebvre	Bloc Québécois
36th	1997–2000	Réjean Lefebvre	Bloc Québécois
37th	2000–2004	Marcel Gagnon	Bloc Québécois
Riding dissolved into Saint-Maurice—Champlain and Trois-Rivières

== Election results ==
1867 Canadian federal election
Party	Candidate	Votes
Conservative	John Jones Ross	1,449
Unknown	M. Martineau	305
Eligible voters		2,562
Source: Canadian Parliamentary Guide, 1871

1872 Canadian federal election
Party	Candidate	Votes
Conservative	John Jones Ross	1,369
Unknown	P.O. Trudel	1,208
Source: Canadian Elections Database

1874 Canadian federal election
Party	Candidate	Votes
Liberal–Conservative	Hippolyte Montplaisir	1,063
Unknown	Robert Trudel	1,052
Source: Canadian Elections Database

1878 Canadian federal election
Party	Candidate	Votes
Liberal–Conservative	Hippolyte Montplaisir	1,673
Unknown	N. Fugere	527
Source: Canadian Elections Database

1882 Canadian federal election
Party	Candidate	Votes
Liberal–Conservative	Hippolyte Montplaisir	1,773
Unknown	A. Turcotte	614

1887 Canadian federal election
Party	Candidate	Votes
Liberal–Conservative	Hippolyte Montplaisir	1,649
Liberal	P.O. Trudel	1,534

1891 Canadian federal election
Party	Candidate	Votes
Conservative	Onésime Carignan	1,976
Unknown	Ferdinand Trudel	1,899

1896 Canadian federal election
Party	Candidate	Votes
Conservative	François-Arthur Marcotte	2,411
Liberal	P. Trudel	2,035

By-election on 7 April 1897 Due to election being declared void 12 January 1897
Party	Candidate	Votes
Conservative	François-Arthur Marcotte	2,314
Liberal	F.X.A. Trudel	2,187

1900 Canadian federal election
Party	Candidate	Votes
Liberal	Jeffrey Alexandre Rousseau	2,903
Conservative	François-Arthur Marcotte	2,572

1904 Canadian federal election
Party	Candidate	Votes
Liberal	Jeffrey Alexandre Rousseau	2,934
Conservative	François-Arthur Marcotte	2,623

1908 Canadian federal election
Party	Candidate	Votes
Conservative	Pierre Édouard Blondin	3,310
Liberal	Ernest Deguise	3,217

1911 Canadian federal election
Party	Candidate	Votes
Conservative	Pierre Édouard Blondin	3,811
Liberal	Jeffrey Alexandre Rousseau	3,444

By-election on 7 November 1914 Due to Pierre Édouard Blondin being appointed Minister of Inland Revenue, 20 October 1914
Party	Candidate	Votes
Conservative	Pierre Édouard Blondin	acclaimed

1917 Canadian federal election
Party	Candidate	Votes
Opposition (Laurier Liberals)	Arthur Lesieur Desaulniers	7,095
Government (Unionist)	Pierre Édouard Blondin	472

1921 Canadian federal election
Party	Candidate	Votes
Liberal	Arthur Lesieur Desaulniers	11,709
Conservative	Joseph Hildèges Desrochers	3,170
Progressive	Auguste Trudel	2,090

1925 Canadian federal election
Party	Candidate	Votes
Liberal	Arthur Lesieur Desaulniers	9,423
Conservative	Albert Joseph Ovila Bergeron	5,057

1926 Canadian federal election
Party	Candidate	Votes
Liberal	Arthur Lesieur Desaulniers	10,024
Conservative	Louis Joseph Dostaler	5,407

1930 Canadian federal election
Party	Candidate	Votes
Conservative	Jean-Louis Baribeau	9,024
Liberal	Arthur Lesieur Desaulniers	8,232
Independent Liberal	Joseph-Edmond Guibord	1,797
Source: lop.parl.ca

1935 Canadian federal election
Party	Candidate	Votes
Liberal	Hervé-Edgar Brunelle	8,172
Conservative	Jean-Louis Baribeau	7,343

1940 Canadian federal election
Party	Candidate	Votes
Liberal	Hervé-Edgar Brunelle	9,546
National Government	Rodrigue Bailly	5,090

1945 Canadian federal election
Party	Candidate	Votes
Liberal	Hervé-Edgar Brunelle	8,332
Independent	Roméo Morrissette	4,298
Progressive Conservative	Ernest Arseneau	1,880
Social Credit	Joseph-Julien-Louis-Philippe St-Cyr	1,139

1949 Canadian federal election
Party	Candidate	Votes
Liberal	Joseph Irenée Rochefort	11,663
Progressive Conservative	Joseph-Lucien-Ivanho Pronovost	7,719
Independent Liberal	Roméo Morrissette	940
Union des électeurs	Henri Meunier	747

1953 Canadian federal election
Party	Candidate	Votes
Liberal	Joseph Irenée Rochefort	14,420
Progressive Conservative	Ivanhoe Pronovost	8,324

1957 Canadian federal election
Party	Candidate	Votes
Liberal	Joseph Irenée Rochefort	13,767
Progressive Conservative	Paul Lahaye	9,988

1958 Canadian federal election
Party	Candidate	Votes
Progressive Conservative	Paul Lahaye	13,537
Liberal	J.-Alfred Mongrain	13,374

1962 Canadian federal election
Party	Candidate	Votes
Liberal	Jean-Paul Matte	9,936
Social Credit	Origène Arvisais	8,662
Progressive Conservative	Paul Lahaye	7,789
New Democratic	Albert Bergeron	815

1963 Canadian federal election
Party	Candidate	Votes
Liberal	Jean-Paul Matte	12,446
Social Credit	Origène Arvisais	7,470
Progressive Conservative	Gaston Marcotte	7,287
New Democratic	J.-Albert Bergeron	570

1965 Canadian federal election
Party	Candidate	Votes
Liberal	Jean-Paul Matte	12,334
Progressive Conservative	Antonio Ricard	6,106
Ralliement créditiste	Roger-J. Simard	5,221
New Democratic	Irénée Leroux	2,098

1968 Canadian federal election
Party	Candidate	Votes
Ralliement créditiste	René Matte	9,866
Liberal	Jean-Paul Matte	9,665
Progressive Conservative	Lucien Filion	6,449
New Democratic	George L. Diamond	550

1972 Canadian federal election
Party	Candidate	Votes
Social Credit	René Matte	14,882
Liberal	Laurier Trottier	11,403
Progressive Conservative	Henriot Gingras	2,770
New Democratic	Jean-Guy Landry	505

1974 Canadian federal election
Party	Candidate	Votes
Social Credit	René Matte	14,466
Liberal	Laurier Trottier	11,896
Progressive Conservative	Paul-A. Pronovost	2,452
New Democratic	Jean-Guy Landry	716

1979 Canadian federal election
Party	Candidate	Votes
Liberal	Michel Veillette	22,256
Independent	René Matte	10,441
Progressive Conservative	Gérard Lamy	4,200
Social Credit	Claude L'Herault	2,796
New Democratic	Denis Tousignant	1,328
Rhinoceros	Gilles Leycuras	753

1980 Canadian federal election
Party	Candidate	Votes
Liberal	Michel Veillette	25,758
New Democratic	René Matte	9,164
Progressive Conservative	Philippe Demers	4,359
Union populaire	Jacques Aubert	238
Marxist–Leninist	Lucie Desrosiers	178
lop.parl.ca

1984 Canadian federal election
Party	Candidate	Votes
Progressive Conservative	Michel Champagne	27,467
Liberal	Michel Veillette	14,459
New Democratic	Louise Cloutier	3,124
Parti nationaliste	Jean Perron	723

1988 Canadian federal election
Party	Candidate	Votes
Progressive Conservative	Michel Champagne	29,788
New Democratic	Jocelyn Crête	8,792
Liberal	André Burke	7,471

1993 Canadian federal election
Party	Candidate	Votes
Bloc Québécois	Réjean Lefebvre	23,646
Progressive Conservative	Michel Champagne	13,083
Liberal	Michel Veillette	11,251
New Democratic	André De Billy	445

1997 Canadian federal election
Party	Candidate	Votes
Bloc Québécois	Réjean Lefebvre	20,687
Liberal	Pierre Lesieur	12,915
Progressive Conservative	Yves St-Amant	12,784
New Democratic	Petra Genest	632

2000 Canadian federal election
Party	Candidate	Votes
Bloc Québécois	Marcel Gagnon	20,423
Liberal	Julie Boulet	20,408
Alberta Alliance	Eric Labranche	2,588
Marijuana	Paul Giroux	1,020
New Democratic	Philip Toone	672

== List of MPs for districts that included Champlain (since 1867) ==
The following list contains members of districts that have included Champlain, since 1867:

Name	Assignments (Note: Cabinet assignments are indicated with a bold font.)	Party	Election (Note: By-elections are indicated with an Italic font.)	Popular Vote
John Jones Ross	Government MP	Conservative	1867	83%
John Jones Ross	Government MP (before 1873); Official Opposition MP (after 1873)	Conservative	1872	53%
Hippolyte Montplaisir	Official Opposition MP	Conservative	1874	50%
Hippolyte Montplaisir	Government MP	Conservative	1878	76%
Hippolyte Montplaisir	Government MP	Conservative	1882	74%
Hippolyte Montplaisir	Government MP	Conservative	1887	52%
Onésime Carignan	Government MP	Conservative	1891	51%
François-Arthur Marcotte (Note: Marcotte's 1896 election was declared void. A by-election was called to settle the matter.)	Official Opposition MP	Conservative	1896	54%
François-Arthur Marcotte	Official Opposition MP	Conservative	1897	51%
Jeffrey Alexandre Rousseau	Government MP	Liberal	1900	53%
Jeffrey Alexandre Rousseau	Government MP	Liberal	1904	53%
Pierre Édouard Blondin	Official Opposition MP	Conservative	1908	51%
Pierre Édouard Blondin (Note: Blondin resigned to become a member of the federal Cabinet in 1914. A by-election was called.)	Government MP	Conservative	1911	53%
Pierre Édouard Blondin (Note: Blondin lost the 1917 election.)	Cabinet Member	Conservative	1914	unopposed
Arthur Lesieur Desaulniers	Official Opposition MP	Liberal	1917	94%
Arthur Lesieur Desaulniers (Note: Bureau resigned to become a member of the federal Cabinet in 1922.)	Government MP	Liberal	1921	69%
Arthur Lesieur Desaulniers	Government MP (until 1926); Official Opposition MP (after 1926)	Liberal	1925	65%
Arthur Lesieur Desaulniers (Note: Desaulniers lost the 1930 election.)	Government MP	Liberal	1926	65%
Jean-Louis Baribeau (Note: Baribeau lost the 1935 election.)	Government MP	Conservative	1930	47%
Hervé-Edgar Brunelle	Government MP	Liberal	1935	53%
Hervé-Edgar Brunelle	Government MP	Liberal	1940	65%
Hervé-Edgar Brunelle	Government MP	Liberal	1945	53%
Irenée Rochefort	Government MP	Liberal	1949	55%
Irenée Rochefort	Government MP	Liberal	1953	63%
Irenée Rochefort	Official Opposition MP	Liberal	1957	58%
Paul Lahaye (Note: Lahaye lost the 1962 election.)	Government MP	Progressive Conservative	1958	50%
Jean-Paul Matte	Official Opposition MP	Liberal	1962	37%
Jean-Paul Matte	Government MP	Liberal	1963	45%
Jean-Paul Matte (Note: Jean-Paul Matte lost the 1968 election.)	Government MP	Liberal	1965	48%
René Matte	Third Party MP	Ralliement Créditiste (Note: The Ralliement Créditiste was renamed Social Credit in 1971.)	1968	37%
René Matte	Third Party MP	Social Credit	1972	50%
René Matte (Note: René Matte sat as an independent by 1978 and lost the 1979 election.)	Third Party MP	Social Credit	1974	49%
Michel Veillette	Official Opposition MP	Liberal	1979	53%
Michel Veillette (Note: Veillette lost the 1984 election.)	Government MP; Parliamentary Secretary (after 1984)	Liberal	1980	65%
Michel Champagne	Government MP; Parliamentary Secretary (after 1986)	Progressive Conservative	1984	60%
Michel Champagne (Note: Champagne lost the 1993 election.)	Parliamentary Secretary	Progressive Conservative	1988	65%
Réjean Lefebvre	Official Opposition MP	Bloc Québécois	1993	49%
Réjean Lefebvre (Note: Lefebvre sat as an independent by 1999.)	Third Party MP	Bloc Québécois	1997	44%
Marcel Gagnon	Third Party MP	Bloc Québécois	2000	45%
Marcel Gagnon	Third Party MP	Bloc Québécois	2004	55%
Jean-Yves Laforest	Third Party MP	Bloc Québécois	2006	44%

== See also ==
- List of Canadian electoral districts
- Mauricie
- Historical federal electoral districts of Canada
