= Henri Charles Bois =

Canadian politician (1897–1962)

The Hon. Henri Charles Bois

Senator for Montarville, Quebec
- In office 1957–1962
- Appointed by: Louis St. Laurent
- Preceded by: Adélard Godbout
- Succeeded by: Louis-Philippe Gélinas

Personal details
- Born: February 8, 1897 St-Joseph de Lévis, Quebec
- Died: July 18, 1962 (aged 65)
- Party: Liberal

Henri-Charles Bois (February 8, 1897 – July 18, 1962) was an agronomist and Canadian Senator.

He was born in St-Joseph de Lévis, Quebec, the son of Napoleon Bois and Lumina Belanger. He was a professor at the Institut Agricole d'Oka and founded the Corporation d'agronomie de Quebec.

He was appointed to the Senate by Louis St. Laurent as a Liberal on January 3, 1957, and represented the Senate division of Montarville, Quebec, until his death in 1962.
