= Hervé-Edgar Brunelle =

Canadian politician

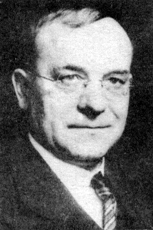

Member of the Canadian Parliament for Champlain
- In office 1935–1949
- Preceded by: Jean-Louis Baribeau
- Succeeded by: Joseph Irenée Rochefort

Personal details
- Born: 13 June 1891 Batiscan, Quebec, Canada
- Died: 15 May 1950 (aged 58)
- Party: Liberal
- Occupation: lawyer

Hervé-Edgar Brunelle (13 June 1891 – 15 May 1950) was a Canadian politician and lawyer. He was elected to the House of Commons of Canada as a Member of the Liberal Party in the 1935 election to represent the riding of Champlain. He was re-elected in 1940 and 1945. He served on the House of Commons Special Committee on Reconstruction and Re-establishment and the Special Committee on Elections and Franchise Acts.

Brunelle was born in Batiscan, Quebec, Canada.
