= Pierre Antoine Deblois =

Canadian politician (1815–1898)

The Hon. Pierre Antoine Deblois
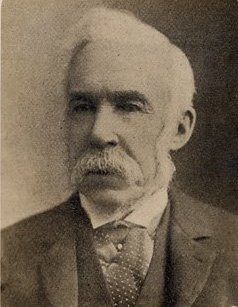

Senator for La Salle, Quebec
- In office 1883–1898
- Appointed by: John A. Macdonald
- Preceded by: Hector Fabre
- Succeeded by: Joseph Arthur Paquet

Personal details
- Born: October 15, 1815 Quebec City, Lower Canada
- Died: June 21, 1898 (aged 82)
- Party: Conservative

Pierre Antoine Deblois (October 15, 1815 – June 21, 1898) was a Canadian farmer and politician. He was a Conservative member of the Senate of Canada for La Salle division from 1883 to 1898.

Deblois was born in Quebec City in 1815 to Joseph Deblois and Marie Ranvoise. He was mayor of Beauport before he was named to the Senate in February 1883. He died in office in 1898.

Deblois' nephew, Sir Adolphe-Philippe Caron, was a member of the House of Commons and the cabinet of Sir John A. Macdonald.
