= Gardner Green Stevens =

Canadian politician

The Hon. Gardner Green Stevens

Senator for Bedford, Quebec
- In office February 12, 1876 – April 15, 1892
- Appointed by: Alexander Mackenzie
- Preceded by: Asa Belknap Foster
- Succeeded by: George Barnard Baker

Personal details
- Born: December 13, 1814 Brompton, Lower Canada
- Died: April 15, 1892 (aged 77)
- Party: Liberal

Gardner Green Stevens (December 13, 1814 – April 15, 1892) was a bank manager and Quebec political figure. He represented the Bedford division in the Senate of Canada from 1876 to 1892 as a member of the Liberal party.

He was born in Brompton, Lower Canada in 1814, the eldest son of Gardner Stevens and Deborah Harrington and brother of John H. Stevens. In 1835, at the age of 21, he became the manager of a farm, mill and store in Waterville for Charles Brooks. He married Relief Jane Spafford in 1847 and they resided in Waterville until 1854 when he moved his family to Frost Village, in Shefford County after being appointed agent for the British American Land Company. A couple of years later, he settled in Roxton Falls where he served as Councillor and Mayor.

In 1859, he became a branch manager for the Eastern Townships Bank which had recently opened a branch in Waterloo. Shortly after this, he was elected to the Shefford Township Council - a seat he held until Waterloo was incorporated as a village at which point he was elected to its first council. He was elected Mayor of Waterloo in 1870. Around this time, he was named a Director of the Eastern Townships Bank, and later became its vice-president. He was also a Director and Treasurer for the Stanstead, Shefford and Chambly Railroad.

Early in 1876, he was appointed to the Senate by Alexander Mackenzie, replacing Asa Belknap Foster. He died in office in 1892 and was buried in Waterloo.
