= Jean-Louis Baribeau =

Canadian politician (1893–1975)

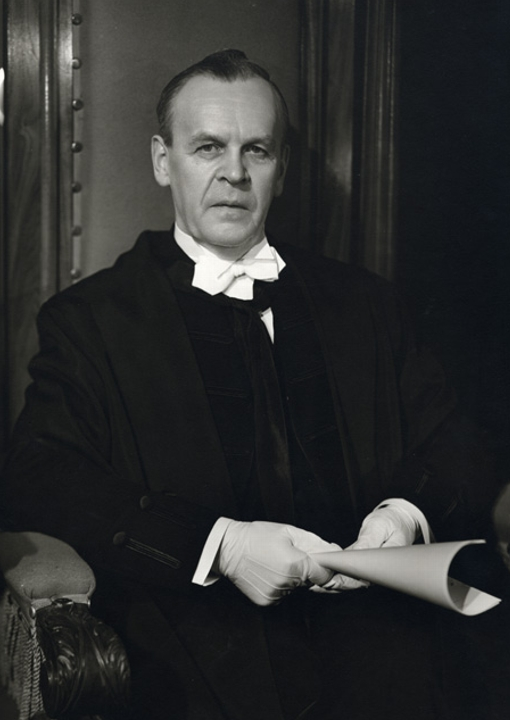

Member of the Legislative Council of Quebec for Shawinigan
- In office 1938–1968
- Preceded by: Némèse Garneau
- Succeeded by: position abolished

Member of the Canadian Parliament for Champlain
- In office 1930–1935
- Preceded by: Arthur Lesieur Desaulniers
- Succeeded by: Hervé-Edgar Brunelle

Personal details
- Born: 19 March 1893 Sainte-Geneviève-de-Batiscan, Mauricie, Quebec, Canada
- Died: 26 December 1975 (aged 82) Trois-Rivières, Quebec, Canada
- Party: Conservative

Jean-Louis Baribeau (19 March 1893 – 26 December 1975) was a Canadian politician and a Member of the House of Commons.

== Background ==
He was born on 19 March 1893, in Sainte-Geneviève-de-Batiscan, Mauricie, the son of Donat Baribeau and Joséphine Lacroix, and was educated in Sainte-Geneviève-de-Batiscan, at the Collège Sacré-Coeur in Victoriaville and at Griffin's Business College in Springfield, Massachusetts. Baribeau was a merchant. He was owner and president of Donat Baribeau & Fils Ltée, president of the Renardière de Sainte-Geneviève and a director of the Quebec retail merchants association. In 1923, he married Aimée Trudel.

== Municipal politics ==
Baribeau was mayor of Sainte-Geneviève-de-Batiscan from 1929 to 1931, from 1937 to 1947 and from 1955 to 1957. He was also warden for Champlain County from 1936 to 1940.

== Member of Parliament ==
Baribeau ran as a Conservative candidate in the federal district of Champlain in 1930 and won.

However, he was defeated by Liberal candidate Hervé-Edgar Brunelle in 1935.

== Legislative Councillor ==
In 1938 he was appointed on the advice of Premier Maurice Duplessis to the Legislative Council of Quebec. He represented the division of Shawinigan and sat with the members of the Union Nationale.

Baribeau served as Speaker of the Legislative Council from 1950 to 1960 and from 1966 until the institution was abolished in 1968.

== Death ==
He died in Trois-Rivières on 26 December 1975.

== Footnotes ==
Political offices
| Preceded by Alphonse Raymond, Union Nationale | Speaker of the Legislative Council; 1950–1960 | Succeeded by Hector Laferté, Liberal |
| Preceded by Hector Laferté, Liberal | Speaker of the Legislative Council; 1966–1968 | Succeeded by Position abolished |
