= Louis-Philippe Gélinas =

Canadian politician (1902–1976)

Member of the Senate of Canada for Montarville, Quebec division
- In office 11 June 1963 – 10 December 1975
- Appointed by: Lester B. Pearson
- Preceded by: Henri Charles Bois
- Succeeded by: John Ewasew

Personal details
- Born: 5 April 1902 Montreal, Quebec
- Died: 1 January 1976 (aged 73)
- Party: Liberal
- Spouse: Gertrude Bruneau
- Profession: business executive

Louis-Philippe Gélinas (5 April 1902 – 1 January 1976) was a Liberal party member of the Senate of Canada. He was born in Montreal, Quebec and became a business executive.

The son of Arthur Gélinas and Laurette Panneton, he was educated in Westmount, at Loyola College and the Université de Montréal. Gélinas was a Wing Commander in the Royal Canadian Air Force during World War II. He served as director for a number of firms, including Geoffrion, Robert and Gélinas Co., Canadian International Paper Company, Canada Cement Company and John Labatt Ltd.

He was appointed to the Senate for the Montarville, Quebec division on 11 June 1963 following nomination by Prime Minister Lester B. Pearson. Gélinas remained in that role until he resigned on 10 December 1975. Gélinas died the following month, on 1 January 1976.
