= Lucien Moraud =

Canadian politician (1885-1951)

The Hon. Lucien Moraud
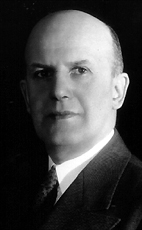

Senator for La Salle, Quebec
- In office 1933–1951
- Appointed by: R. B. Bennett
- Preceded by: Jacques Bureau
- Succeeded by: Mark Robert Drouin

Personal details
- Born: May 16, 1885 Lotbinière, Quebec
- Died: May 29, 1951 (aged 66)
- Party: Conservative (1933-1942); Progressive Conservative (1942-1951)

Lucien Moraud, KC (May 16, 1885 – May 29, 1951) was a Canadian lawyer, law professor and Conservative politician. He was named to the Senate of Canada on December 30, 1933, and remained a senator until his death in 1951.

He was one of the Canadian delegates at the founding of the United Nations.

Pavillon H.-Biermans-L.-Moraud, a residence hall at Université Laval, is named after him and Belgian businessperson Jean-Hubert Biermans in honour of their donations to the university.
