= List of Quebec senators =

This is a list of past and present members of the Senate of Canada representing the province of Quebec.

Quebec has 24 permanent Senate divisions that are fixed under section 22 of the Constitution Act, 1867, which provides that "In the Case of Quebec each of the Twenty-four Senators representing that Province shall be appointed for One of the Twenty-four Electoral Divisions of Lower Canada..." Lower Canada (later the eastern portion of the Province of Canada) was Quebec's predecessor colony.

In addition to the other qualifications for appointment to the Senate, a Quebec senator must, in accordance with subsection 23(5) of the Constitution Act, 1867, "have his Real Property Qualification in the Electoral Division for which he is appointed, or shall be resident in that Division". In other words, the senator must either live in his or her division or own an immovable in the division worth at least $4,000 on a net basis. The Quebec senator must continue to meet this qualification to remain in office under subsection 31(5) of the Constitution Act, 1867.

In other provinces, although senators can designate their own divisions within the province they represent, those designations do not have legal significance.

== Current Quebec senators ==
Name	Current affiliation	Division	Date appointed	Appointed by^{1}	On the advice of	Mandatory retirement
Michèle Audette	Progressive Senate Group	De Salaberry	July 29, 2021	Simon	J. Trudeau	July 20, 2046
Patrick Brazeau	Non-affiliated	Repentigny	January 8, 2009	Jean	Harper	November 11, 2049
Claude Carignan	Conservative	Mille Isles	August 27, 2009	Jean	Harper	December 4, 2039
Pierre Dalphond	Progressive Senate Group	De Lorimier	June 6, 2018	Payette	J. Trudeau	May 1, 2029
Éric Forest	Independent Senators Group	Gulf	November 21, 2016	Johnston	J. Trudeau	April 6, 2027
Rosa Galvez	Independent Senators Group	Bedford	December 6, 2016	Johnston	J. Trudeau	June 21, 2036
Amina Gerba	Progressive Senate Group	Rigaud	July 29, 2021	Simon	J. Trudeau	March 14, 2036
Clément Gignac	Canadian Senators Group	Kennebec	July 29, 2021	Simon	J. Trudeau	May 7, 2030
Martine Hébert	Non-affiliated	Victoria	February 7, 2025	Simon	J. Trudeau	October 7, 2040
Danièle Henkel	Non-affiliated	Alma	February 14, 2025	Simon	J. Trudeau	January 16, 2031
Leo Housakos	Conservative	Wellington	January 8, 2009	Jean	Harper	January 10, 2043
Tony Loffreda	Independent Senators Group	Shawinigan	July 23, 2019	Payette	J. Trudeau	August 14, 2037
Richard Martel	Conservative	Rougemont	July 24, 2026	Arbour	Carney	March 23, 2036
Julie Miville-Dechêne	Independent Senators Group	Inkerman	June 20, 2018	Payette	J. Trudeau	July 10, 2034
Pierre Moreau	Progressive Senate Group	The Laurentides	September 10, 2024	Simon	J. Trudeau	December 12, 2032
Manuelle Oudar	Independent Senators Group	La Salle	February 13, 2024	Simon	J. Trudeau	July 5, 2038
Chantal Petitclerc	Independent Senators Group	Grandville	April 1, 2016	Johnston	J. Trudeau	December 15, 2044
Tom Pitfield	Non-affiliated	De la Durantaye	September 18, 2026	Arbour	Carney	August 7, 2050
Raymonde Saint-Germain	Independent Senators Group	De la Vallière	November 25, 2016	Johnston	J. Trudeau	October 7, 2026
Josée Verner	Canadian Senators Group	Montarville	June 13, 2011	Johnston	Harper	December 30, 2034
Suze Youance	Independent Senators Group	Lauzon	September 25, 2024	Simon	J. Trudeau	August 11, 2045

^{1} Senators are appointed by the governor general on the recommendation of the prime minister listed.

== Members by Senate division ==
The boundaries for all Quebec districts are mandated in the Constitution Act 1867 and cannot change without a constitutional amendment. The boundaries are described in the 1859 Consolidated Statutes of Canada.

Self-designated Senate divisions can be used by senators appointed under the Regional Expansion Clause Section 26 of the Constitution Act 1867. This clause can be used to increase the Senate seats by one or two senators for each region (Ontario, Quebec, the Maritimes and the Western Provinces). Prime Minister Brian Mulroney is the only one to use this clause, on September 27, 1990.

=== Self-designated ===
These senators were appointed under a constitutional provision that allowed the number of Quebec senators to temporarily increase by one or two. As such, these senators belonged to no constitutionally-mandated division, and could designate one of their choosing.

Name	Affiliation	Division	Date appointed/ affiliation change	Appointed by	On the advice of	End of term	Reason
Normand Grimard	Progressive Conservative	Quebec	September 27, 1990	Hnatyshyn	Mulroney	June 16, 2000	Retirement
Thérèse Lavoie-Roux	Progressive Conservative	Acadie	September 27, 1990	Hnatyshyn	Mulroney	March 12, 2001	Resignation

=== Alma ===
The Alma Senate division is defined in the Consolidated Statutes of Canada (1859) as "The Parishes of Long Point, Pointe-aux-Trembles, Rivière des Prairies, Sault aux Récollets, in the county of Hochelaga, and that part of the Parish of Montreal which lies to the East of the prolongation of St. Denis Street; the County of Laval, that part of the City of Montreal which lies to the East of Bonsécours and St. Denis Streets, and their prolongation."

Name	Affiliation	Date appointed/ affiliation change	Appointed by	On the advice of	End of term	Reason
James Leslie	Conservative	October 23, 1867	Monck	Royal Proclamation	December 6, 1873	Death
Edward Goff Penny	Liberal	March 13, 1874	Dufferin	Mackenzie	October 11, 1881	Death
Alexander Walker Ogilvie	Conservative	December 24, 1881	Lorne	Macdonald	January 18, 1901	Resignation
Robert Mackay	Liberal	January 21, 1901	Minto	Laurier	December 25, 1916	Death
George Green Foster	Conservative	July 27, 1917	Devonshire	Borden	May 1, 1931	Death
Charles Ballantyne	Conservative	February 3, 1932	Bessborough	Bennett	October 19, 1950	Death
Charles Ballantyne	Progressive Conservative	December 11, 1942	Bessborough	Bennett	October 19, 1950	Death
Hartland Molson	Independent	July 28, 1955	Massey	St. Laurent	May 31, 1993	Resignation
David Angus	Progressive Conservative	June 10, 1993	Hnatyshyn	Mulroney	July 21, 2012	Retirement
David Angus	Conservative	February 2, 2004	Hnatyshyn	Mulroney	July 21, 2012	Retirement
Diane Bellemare	Conservative	September 6, 2012	Johnston	Harper	October 11, 2024	Retirement
Diane Bellemare	Non-affiliated	March 8, 2016	Johnston	Harper	October 11, 2024	Retirement
Diane Bellemare	Independent Senators Group	November 14, 2019	Johnston	Harper	October 11, 2024	Retirement
Diane Bellemare	Progressive Senate Group	September 17, 2021	Johnston	Harper	October 11, 2024	Retirement
Danièle Henkel	Progressive Senate Group	February 14, 2025	Simon	J. Trudeau	Incumbent	

=== Bedford ===
The Bedford Senate division is defined in the Consolidated Statutes of Canada (1859) as "The Counties of Missisquoi, Brome, and Shefford."

Name	Affiliation	Date appointed/ affiliation change	Appointed by	On the advice of	End of term	Reason
Asa Belknap Foster	Conservative	October 23, 1867	Monck	Royal Proclamation	January 1, 1874	Resignation
Gardner Green Stevens	Liberal	February 12, 1876	Dufferin	Mackenzie	April 15, 1892	Death
George Barnard Baker	Liberal-Conservative	January 7, 1896	Aberdeen	Bowell	February 9, 1910	Death
Rufus Henry Pope	Conservative	November 14, 1911	Connaught	Borden	May 16, 1944	Death
Jacob Nicol	Liberal	July 14, 1944	Athlone	King	September 23, 1958	Death
Louis-Philippe Beaubien	Progressive Conservative	November 16, 1960	Vanier	Diefenbaker	March 28, 1985	Death
Paul David	Progressive Conservative	April 16, 1985	Sauvé	Mulroney	December 25, 1994	Retirement
Céline Hervieux-Payette	Liberal	March 21, 1995	LeBlanc	Chrétien	April 22, 2016	Retirement
Rosa Galvez	Independent Senators Group	December 6, 2016	Johnston	Trudeau, J.	Incumbent	

=== De la Durantaye ===
The De la Durantaye Senate division is defined in the Consolidated Statutes of Canada (1859) as "The remainder of the County of L'Islet, the countie[s] of Montmagny and Bellechasse and the Parishes of St. Joseph, St. Henri and Notre Dame de la Victoire, in the County of Lévi." The demarcation of the Grandville Senate division provides an explanation of what constitutes the "remainder of the County of L'Islet".

Name	Affiliation	Date appointed/ affiliation change	Appointed by	On the advice of	End of term	Reason
Joseph-Noël Bossé	Conservative	October 23, 1867	Monck	Royal Proclamation	January 1, 1868	Resignation
Jean-Charles Chapais	Conservative	January 30, 1868	Monck	Macdonald	July 17, 1885	Death
John Jones Ross	Conservative	April 12, 1887	Lansdowne	Macdonald	May 4, 1901	Death
Alphonse Déchêne	Liberal	May 13, 1901	Minto	Laurier	May 1, 1902	Death
Jules Tessier	Liberal	March 12, 1903	Minto	Laurier	January 6, 1934	Death
Émile Fortin	Conservative	August 14, 1935	Bessborough	Bennett	May 18, 1936	Death
Fernand Fafard	Liberal	January 29, 1940	Tweedsmuir	King	May 14, 1955	Death
Jean-François Pouliot	Liberal	July 28, 1955	Massey	St. Laurent	June 28, 1968	Resignation
Louis Giguère	Liberal	September 10, 1968	Michener	Trudeau, P. E.	December 18, 1986	Retirement
Jean Bazin	Progressive Conservative	December 29, 1986	Sauvé	Mulroney	December 8, 1989	Resignation
Mario Beaulieu	Progressive Conservative	August 30, 1990	Hnatyshyn	Mulroney	June 22, 1994	Resignation
Lise Bacon	Liberal	September 15, 1994	Hnatyshyn	Chrétien	August 25, 2009	Retirement
Judith Seidman	Conservative	August 27, 2009	Jean	Harper	August 31, 2025	Retirement
Tom Pitfield	Non-affiliated	September 18, 2026	Arbour	Carney	Incumbent	

=== De la Vallière ===
The De la Vallière Senate division is defined in the Consolidated Statutes of Canada (1859) as "The Counties of Nicolet and Yamaska, the Townships of Wendover, Grantham, and the part of Upton which lies in the County of Drummond."

Name	Affiliation	Date appointed/ affiliation change	Appointed by	On the advice of	End of term	Reason
Charles-Christophe Malhiot	Liberal	October 23, 1867	Monck	Royal Proclamation	November 9, 1874	Death
Anselme-Homère Pâquet	Liberal	February 9, 1875	Dufferin	Mackenzie	December 22, 1891	Death
Auguste-Réal Angers	Conservative	December 16, 1892	Stanley	Thompson	June 10, 1896	Resignation
Alfred Thibaudeau	Liberal	August 22, 1896	Aberdeen	Laurier	August 15, 1926	Death
Donat Raymond	Liberal	December 20, 1926	Willingdon	King	June 5, 1963	Death
Romuald Bourque	Liberal	July 6, 1963	Vanier	Pearson	August 14, 1974	Death
Jean Marchand	Liberal	December 9, 1976	Léger	Trudeau, P. E.	December 15, 1983	Resignation
Pierre de Bané	Liberal	June 29, 1984	Sauvé	Trudeau, P. E.	August 2, 2013	Retirement
Raymonde Saint-Germain	Independent Senators Group	November 25, 2016	Johnston	Trudeau, J.	Incumbent	

=== De Lanaudière ===
The De Lanaudière Senate division is defined in the Consolidated Statutes of Canada (1859) as "The remainder of the County of Maskinongé, the Counties of Berthier and Joliette, with the exception of the Parish of St. Paul, the Township of Kidldare and its augmentation, and the Township of Cathcart". The demarcation of the Shawinigan Senate division provides an explanation of what constitutes the "remainder of the County of Maskinongé".

Name	Affiliation	Date appointed/ affiliation change	Appointed by	On the advice of	End of term	Reason
Louis Auguste Olivier	Liberal	October 23, 1867	Monck	Royal Proclamation	September 8, 1873	Resignation
Joseph-Hyacinthe Bellerose	Conservative	October 7, 1873	Dufferin	Macdonald	August 13, 1899	Death
Joseph Philippe Baby Casgrain	Liberal	January 29, 1900	Minto	Laurier	January 6, 1939	Death
Édouard-Charles St-Père	Liberal	February 9, 1940	Tweedsmuir	King	January 31, 1950	Death
Sarto Fournier	Liberal	June 12, 1953	Massey	St. Laurent	July 23, 1980	Death
Thomas Lefebvre	Liberal	July 9, 1984	Sauvé	Turner	November 20, 1992	Death
In abeyance - the appointment of Thérèse Lavoie-Roux to the temporary division of Acadie under section 26 of the Constitution Act, 1867 required this division be left vacant between Lefebvre's death and Lavoie-Roux's retirement on March 12, 2001						
Paul Massicotte	Liberal	June 26, 2003	Clarkson	Chrétien	September 9, 2025	Resignation
Paul Massicotte	Senate Liberal Caucus	January 29, 2014	Clarkson	Chrétien	September 9, 2025	Resignation
Paul Massicotte	Independent Senators Group	October 30, 2017	Clarkson	Chrétien	September 9, 2025	Resignation

=== De Lorimier ===
The De Lorimier Senate division is defined in the Consolidated Statutes of Canada (1859) as "The Counties of St. John and Napierville; St. Jean Chrysostôme and Russeltown in the County of Chateauguay; Hemmingford in the County of Huntingdon."

Name	Affiliation	Date appointed/ affiliation change	Appointed by	On the advice of	End of term	Reason
Jacques-Olivier Bureau	Liberal	October 23, 1867	Monck	Royal Proclamation	February 7, 1883	Death
Alexandre Lacoste	Conservative	January 11, 1884	Lansdowne	Macdonald	September 13, 1891	Resignation
Alphonse Desjardins	Conservative	October 1, 1892	Stanley	Abbott	June 16, 1896	Resignation
François Béchard	Liberal	July 17, 1896	Aberdeen	Laurier	April 13, 1897	Death
Raoul Dandurand	Liberal	January 22, 1898	Aberdeen	Laurier	March 11, 1942	Death
Thomas Vien	Liberal	October 5, 1942	Athlone	King	April 1, 1968	Resignation
Raymond Eudes	Liberal	April 8, 1968	Michener	Pearson	October 25, 1980	Death
Philippe Gigantès	Liberal	January 13, 1984	Schreyer	Trudeau, P. E.	August 16, 1998	Retirement
Joan Fraser	Liberal	September 17, 1998	LeBlanc	Chrétien	February 2, 2018	Resignation
Pierre Dalphond	Independent Senators Group	June 6, 2018	Payette	Trudeau, J.	Incumbent	
Pierre Dalphond	Progressive Senate Group	May 21, 2020	Payette	Trudeau, J.	Incumbent	

=== De Salaberry ===
The De Salaberry Senate division is defined in the Consolidated Statutes of Canada (1859) as "The remainder of the County of Chateauguay, the remainder of the County of Huntingdon, and the County of Beauharnois." The demarcation of the De Lorimier Senate division provides an explanation of which parishes are excluded from the De Salaberry Senate division.

Name	Affiliation	Date appointed/ affiliation change	Appointed by	On the advice of	End of term	Reason
Louis Renaud	Conservative	October 23, 1867	Monck	Royal Proclamation	October 1, 1873	Resignation
François-Xavier-Anselme Trudel	Conservative	October 31, 1873	Dufferin	Macdonald	January 17, 1890	Death
Joseph Tassé	Conservative	February 9, 1891	Stanley	Macdonald	January 17, 1895	Death
Joseph-Octave Villeneuve	Conservative	January 2, 1896	Aberdeen	Bowell	June 27, 1901	Death
Frédéric Liguori Béique	Liberal	February 7, 1902	Minto	Laurier	September 12, 1933	Death
Guillaume-André Fauteux	Conservative	December 30, 1933	Bessborough	Bennett	September 10, 1940	Death
Léon Mercier Gouin	Liberal	November 7, 1940	Athlone	King	March 18, 1976	Resignation
Yvette Boucher Rousseau	Liberal	March 27, 1979	Schreyer	Trudeau, P. E.	March 17, 1988	Death
Jean-Marie Poitras	Progressive Conservative	September 26, 1988	Sauvé	Mulroney	May 25, 1993	Resignation
Pierre Claude Nolin	Progressive Conservative	June 18, 1993	Hnatyshyn	Mulroney	April 23, 2015	Death
Pierre Claude Nolin	Conservative	February 2, 2004	Hnatyshyn	Mulroney	April 23, 2015	Death
André Pratte	Independent / Non-affiliated	April 1, 2016	Johnston	Trudeau, J.	October 21, 2019	Resignation
André Pratte	Independent Senators Group	June 1, 2017	Johnston	Trudeau, J.	October 21, 2019	Resignation
Michèle Audette	Non-affiliated	July 29, 2021	Simon	Trudeau, J.	Incumbent	
Michèle Audette	Independent Senators Group	September 27, 2021	Simon	Trudeau, J.	Incumbent	
Michèle Audette	Progressive Senate Group	June 27, 2022	Simon	Trudeau, J.	Incumbent	

=== Grandville ===
The Grandville Senate division is defined in the Consolidated Statutes of Canada (1859) as "The Counties of Temiscouata and Kamouraska, the Parishes of St. Roch des Aulnets and St. Jean Port Joli, and the prolongation thereof in a straight line to the Province Line in the County of L'Islet."

Name	Affiliation	Date appointed/ affiliation change	Appointed by	On the advice of	End of term	Reason
Luc Letellier de St-Just	Nationalist Liberal	October 23, 1867	Monck	Royal Proclamation	December 15, 1876	Resignation
Charles Pelletier	Liberal	February 2, 1877	Dufferin	Mackenzie	September 1, 1904	Resignation
Philippe-Auguste Choquette	Liberal	September 30, 1904	Minto	Laurier	December 29, 1919	Resignation
Thomas Chapais	Conservative	December 31, 1919	Devonshire	Borden	July 15, 1946	Death
Paul Henri Bouffard	Liberal	December 27, 1946	Alexander	King	February 16, 1966	Death
Léopold Langlois	Liberal	July 8, 1966	Vanier	Pearson	October 2, 1988	Retirement
John Lynch-Staunton	Progressive Conservative	September 23, 1990	Hnatyshyn	Mulroney	June 19, 2005	Retirement
John Lynch-Staunton	Conservative	February 2, 2004	Hnatyshyn	Mulroney	June 19, 2005	Retirement
Andrée Champagne	Conservative	August 2, 2005	Clarkson	Martin	July 17, 2014	Retirement
Chantal Petitclerc	Independent	April 1, 2016	Johnston	Trudeau, J.	Incumbent	
Chantal Petitclerc	Independent Senators Group	December 2, 2016	Johnston	Trudeau, J.	Incumbent	

=== Gulf ===
The Gulf Senate division is defined in the Consolidated Statutes of Canada (1859) as "The Counties of Gaspé, Bonaventure and Rimouski."

Name	Affiliation	Date appointed/ affiliation change	Appointed by	On the advice of	End of term	Reason
Ulric-Joseph Tessier	Liberal	October 23, 1867	Monck	Royal Proclamation	February 11, 1873	Resignation
Eugène Chinic	Conservative	April 10, 1873	Dufferin	Macdonald	November 3, 1882	Resignation
Louis Robitaille	Conservative	February 8, 1883	Lorne	Macdonald	December 28, 1884	Resignation
Théodore Robitaille	Conservative	January 29, 1885	Lansdowne	Macdonald	August 17, 1897	Death
Jean-Baptiste Romuald Fiset	Liberal	October 20, 1897	Aberdeen	Laurier	January 5, 1917	Death
David Ovide L'Espérance	Conservative	July 26, 1917	Devonshire	Borden	August 31, 1941	Death
Joseph Arthur Lesage	Liberal	March 3, 1944	Athlone	King	March 9, 1950	Death
Charles Gavan Power	Liberal	July 28, 1955	Massey	St. Laurent	May 30, 1968	Death
Paul C. Lafond	Liberal	October 7, 1970	Michener	Trudeau, P. E.	May 27, 1988	Death
Roch Bolduc	Progressive Conservative	September 26, 1988	Sauvé	Mulroney	September 10, 2003	Retirement
Roméo Dallaire	Liberal	March 24, 2005	Clarkson	Martin	June 17, 2014	Resignation
Éric Forest	Independent Senators Group	November 21, 2016	Johnston	Trudeau, J.	Incumbent	

=== Inkerman ===
The Inkerman Senate division is defined in the Consolidated Statutes of Canada (1859) as "The Counties of Argenteuil, Ottawa and Pontiac."

Name	Affiliation	Date appointed/ affiliation change	Appointed by	On the advice of	End of term	Reason
John Hamilton	Conservative	October 23, 1867	Monck	Royal Proclamation	May 1, 1887	Resignation
John Abbott	Liberal-Conservative	May 12, 1887	Lansdowne	Macdonald	October 30, 1893	Death
William Owens	Conservative	January 2, 1896	Aberdeen	Bowell	June 8, 1917	Death
Richard Smeaton White	Conservative	July 30, 1917	Devonshire	Borden	December 17, 1936	Death
Adrian Knatchbull-Hugessen	Liberal	January 12, 1937	Tweedsmuir	King	January 1, 1967	Resignation
Maurice Lamontagne	Liberal	April 6, 1967	Léger	Pearson	June 12, 1983	Death
Charlie Watt	Liberal	January 16, 1984	Schreyer	Trudeau, P. E.	March 16, 2018	Resignation
Julie Miville-Dechêne	Independent Senators Group	June 20, 2018	Payette	Trudeau, J	Incumbent	

=== Kennebec ===
The Kennebec Senate division is defined in the Consolidated Statutes of Canada (1859) as "The Counties of Lotbinière, Mégantic and Arthabaska."

Name	Affiliation	Date appointed/ affiliation change	Appointed by	On the advice of	End of term	Reason
Charles Cormier	Nationalist Liberal	October 23, 1867	Monck	Royal Proclamation	May 7, 1887	Death
Pierre-Étienne Fortin	Conservative	May 13, 1887	Lansdowne	Macdonald	June 15, 1888	Death
George Alexander Drummond	Conservative	December 1, 1888	Stanley	Macdonald	February 2, 1910	Death
Louis Lavergne	Liberal	October 13, 1910	Grey	Laurier	January 1, 1930	Resignation
Georges Parent	Liberal	June 3, 1930	Willingdon	King	December 14, 1942	Death
Cyrille Vaillancourt	Liberal	March 3, 1944	Athlone	King	January 3, 1969	Resignation
Jean-Pierre Côté	Liberal	September 1, 1972	Michener	Trudeau, P. E.	April 20, 1978	Resignation
Claude Wagner	Progressive Conservative	April 21, 1978	Léger	Trudeau, P. E.	July 11, 1979	Death
Guy Charbonneau	Progressive Conservative	September 27, 1979	Schreyer	Clark	June 21, 1997	Retirement
Serge Joyal	Liberal	November 26, 1997	LeBlanc	Chrétien	February 1, 2020	Retirement
Serge Joyal	Senate Liberal Caucus	January 29, 2014	LeBlanc	Chrétien	February 1, 2020	Retirement
Serge Joyal	Progressive Senate Group	November 14, 2019	LeBlanc	Chrétien	February 1, 2020	Retirement
Clément Gignac	Progressive Senate Group	July 29, 2021	Simon	Trudeau, J.	Incumbent	
Clément Gignac	Canadian Senators Group	October 25, 2024	Simon	Trudeau, J.	Incumbent	

=== La Salle ===
The La Salle Senate division is defined in the Consolidated Statutes of Canada (1859) as "The remainder of the County of Quebec, the County of Portneuf, and all that part of the Banlieue of Quebec which likes within the Parish of Notre Dame de Quebec." The demarcation of the Laurentides Senate division provides an explanation of what constitutes the "remainder of the County of Quebec".

Name	Affiliation	Date appointed/ affiliation change	Appointed by	On the advice of	End of term	Reason
Antoine Juchereau Duchesnay	Conservative	October 23, 1867	Monck	Royal Proclamation	January 7, 1871	Resignation
Louis Panet	Conservative	February 10, 1871	Lisgar	Macdonald	March 26, 1874	Resignation
Charles-Eugène Panet	Liberal	March 27, 1874	Dufferin	Mackenzie	February 4, 1875	Resignation
Hector Fabre	Nationalist	February 5, 1875	Dufferin	Mackenzie	July 12, 1882	Resignation
Pierre Antoine Deblois	Conservative	February 13, 1883	Lorne	Macdonald	June 21, 1898	Death
Joseph Arthur Paquet	Liberal	June 27, 1898	Aberdeen	Laurier	March 29, 1901	Death
Joseph Godbout	Liberal	April 4, 1901	Minto	Laurier	April 1, 1923	Death
Jacques Bureau	Liberal	September 5, 1925	Byng	King	January 23, 1933	Death
Lucien Moraud	Conservative	December 30, 1933	Bessborough	Bennett	May 29, 1951	Death
Lucien Moraud	Progressive Conservative	December 11, 1942	Bessborough	Bennett	May 29, 1951	Death
Mark Robert Drouin	Progressive Conservative	October 4, 1957	Massey	Diefenbaker	October 12, 1963	Death
Azellus Denis	Liberal	February 3, 1964	Vanier	Pearson	September 4, 1991	Death
Marcel Prud'homme	Independent	May 26, 1993	Hnatyshyn	Mulroney	November 30, 2009	Retirement
Pierre-Hugues Boisvenu	Conservative	January 29, 2010	Jean	Harper	February 12, 2024	Retirement
Pierre-Hugues Boisvenu	Independent	June 4, 2015	Jean	Harper	February 12, 2024	Retirement
Pierre-Hugues Boisvenu	Conservative	November 22, 2016	Jean	Harper	February 12, 2024	Retirement
Manuelle Oudar	Independent Senators Group	February 13, 2024	Simon	Trudeau, J.	Incumbent	

=== Lauzon ===
The Lauzon Senate division is defined in the Consolidated Statutes of Canada (1859) as "The remainder of the County of Lévi, the Counties of Dorchester and Beauce." The demarcation of the De la Durantaye Senate division provides an explanation of what constitutes the "remainder of the County of L'Islet".

Name	Affiliation	Date appointed/ affiliation change	Appointed by	On the advice of	End of term	Reason
Elzéar-Henri Juchereau Duchesnay	Conservative	October 23, 1867	Monck	Royal Proclamation	May 12, 1871	Death
Alexandre-René Chaussegros de Léry	Conservative	December 13, 1871	Lisgar	Macdonald	April 11, 1876	Resignation
Christian Pozer	Nationalist	September 20, 1876	Dufferin	Mackenzie	July 18, 1884	Death
Joseph Bolduc	Nationalist Conservative	October 3, 1884	Lansdowne	Macdonald	August 13, 1924	Death
Henri Sévérin Béland	Liberal	September 5, 1925	Byng	King	April 22, 1935	Death
Eugène Paquet	Conservative	August 14, 1935	Bessborough	Bennett	May 8, 1951	Death
Léonard Tremblay	Liberal	June 12, 1953	Massey	St. Laurent	September 2, 1965	Resignation
Jean-Paul Deschatelets	Liberal	February 24, 1966	Vanier	Pearson	January 10, 1986	Resignation
Michel Cogger	Progressive Conservative	May 2, 1986	Sauvé	Mulroney	September 1, 2000	Resignation
Yves Morin	Liberal	March 8, 2001	Clarkson	Chrétien	November 28, 2004	Retirement
Dennis Dawson	Liberal	August 2, 2005	Clarkson	Martin	September 28, 2024	Retirement
Dennis Dawson	Senate Liberal Caucus	January 29, 2014	Clarkson	Martin	September 28, 2024	Retirement
Dennis Dawson	Progressive Senate Group	November 14, 2019	Clarkson	Martin	September 28, 2024	Retirement
Suze Youance	Independent Senators Group	September 25, 2024	Simon	Trudeau, J.	Incumbent	

=== Mille Isles ===
The Mille Isles Senate division is defined in the Consolidated Statutes of Canada (1859) as "The Counties of Terrebonne and Two Mountains."

	Name	Affiliation	Date appointed/ affiliation change	Appointed by	On the advice of	End of term	Reason
	Léandre Dumouchel	Conservative	October 23, 1867	Monck	Royal Proclamation	September 23, 1882	Death
1.	Louis-Rodrigue Masson	Conservative	September 29, 1882	Lorne	Macdonald	November 6, 1884	Resignation
	Louis-Adélard Senécal	Conservative	January 25, 1887	Lansdowne	Macdonald	October 11, 1887	Death
	Jean-Baptiste Rolland	Conservative	October 22, 1887	Lansdowne	Macdonald	March 22, 1888	Death
	Charles-Séraphin Rodier	Conservative	December 12, 1888	Stanley	Macdonald	January 26, 1890	Death
2.	Louis-Rodrigue Masson	Conservative	February 3, 1890	Stanley	Macdonald	June 11, 1903	Resignation
	Laurent-Olivier David	Liberal	June 19, 1903	Minto	Laurier	August 24, 1926	Death
	Napoléon Kemner Laflamme	Liberal	December 21, 1927	Willingdon	King	August 10, 1929	Death
	Jules-Édouard Prévost	Liberal	June 3, 1930	Willingdon	King	October 13, 1943	Death
	Armand Daigle	Liberal	March 3, 1944	Athlone	King	March 8, 1957	Death
	Gustave Monette	Progressive Conservative	October 12, 1957	Massey	Diefenbaker	December 23, 1969	Death
	Thérèse Casgrain	Independent	October 7, 1970	Michener	Trudeau, P. E.	July 10, 1971	Retirement
	Renaude Lapointe	Liberal	November 10, 1971	Michener	Trudeau, P. E.	January 3, 1987	Retirement
	Solange Chaput-Rolland	Progressive Conservative	September 26, 1988	Sauvé	Mulroney	May 14, 1994	Retirement
	Jean-Louis Roux	Liberal	August 31, 1994	Hnatyshyn	Chrétien	August 8, 1996	Resignation
	Léonce Mercier	Liberal	August 9, 1996	LeBlanc	Chrétien	August 11, 2001	Retirement
	Michel Biron	Liberal	October 4, 2001	Clarkson	Chrétien	March 16, 2009	Retirement
	Claude Carignan	Conservative	August 27, 2009	Jean	Harper	Incumbent	

=== Montarville ===
The Montarville Senate division is defined in the Consolidated Statutes of Canada (1859) as "The Counties of Verchères, Chambly and Laprairie."

Name	Affiliation	Date appointed/ affiliation change	Appointed by	On the advice of	End of term	Reason
Louis Lacoste	Conservative	October 23, 1867	Monck	Royal Proclamation	November 26, 1878	Death
Charles Boucher de Boucherville	Conservative	February 12, 1879	Lorne	Macdonald	September 11, 1915	Death
Charles-Philippe Beaubien	Conservative	December 3, 1915	Connaught	Borden	January 17, 1949	Death
Adélard Godbout	Liberal	June 25, 1949	Alexander	St. Laurent	September 18, 1956	Death
Henri Charles Bois	Liberal	January 3, 1957	Massey	St. Laurent	July 18, 1962	Death
Louis-Philippe Gélinas	Liberal	June 11, 1963	Vanier	Pearson	December 10, 1965	Resignation
John Ewasew	Liberal	December 17, 1976	Léger	Trudeau, P. E.	March 26, 1978	Death
Dalia Wood	Liberal	March 26, 1979	Schreyer	Trudeau, P. E.	January 31, 1999	Resignation
Sheila Finestone	Liberal	August 11, 1999	LeBlanc	Chrétien	January 28, 2002	Retirement
Raymond Lavigne	Liberal	March 26, 2002	Clarkson	Chrétien	March 21, 2011	Resignation
Raymond Lavigne	Liberal without caucus	June 8, 2006	Clarkson	Chrétien	March 21, 2011	Resignation
Josée Verner	Conservative	June 13, 2011	Johnston	Harper	Incumbent	
Josée Verner	Independent Senators Group	October 17, 2017	Johnston	Harper	Incumbent	
Josée Verner	Canadian Senators Group	November 4, 2019	Johnston	Harper	Incumbent	

=== Repentigny ===
The Repentigny Senate division is defined in the Consolidated Statutes of Canada (1859) as "The Parish of St. Paul, the Township of Kildare and its augmentation, and the Township of Cathcart, in the County of Joliette, the Counties of L'Assomption and Montcalm."

Name	Affiliation	Date appointed/ affiliation change	Appointed by	On the advice of	End of term	Reason
Joseph-François Armand	Conservative	October 23, 1867	Monck	Royal Proclamation	January 1, 1903	Death
Joseph-Hormisdas Legris	Liberal	February 10, 1903	Minto	Laurier	March 6, 1932	Death
Joseph Hormisdas Rainville	Conservative	October 6, 1932	Bessborough	Bennett	April 14, 1942	Death
Pamphile Réal Du Tremblay	Liberal	November 19, 1942	Athlone	King	October 6, 1955	Death
J.-Eugène Lefrançois	Liberal	April 25, 1957	Massey	St. Laurent	November 5, 1976	Resignation
Pietro Rizzuto	Liberal	December 23, 1976	Léger	Trudeau, P. E.	August 3, 1997	Death
Marisa Ferretti Barth	Liberal	September 22, 1997	LeBlanc	Chrétien	April 28, 2006	Retirement
Patrick Brazeau	Conservative	January 8, 2009	Jean	Harper	Incumbent	
Patrick Brazeau	Independent	February 7, 2013	Jean	Harper	Incumbent	

=== Rigaud ===
The Rigaud Senate division is defined in the Consolidated Statutes of Canada (1859) as "The remainder of the Parish of Montreal, and the Counties of Jacques Cartier, Vaudreuil and Solanges." The demarcation of the Alma Senate division provides an explanation of what constitutes the "remainder of the Parish of Montreal".

Name	Affiliation	Date appointed/ affiliation change	Appointed by	On the advice of	End of term	Reason
Charles Wilson	Conservative	October 23, 1867	Monck	Royal Proclamation	May 4, 1877	Death
Joseph-Rosaire Thibaudeau	Liberal	January 4, 1878	Dufferin	Mackenzie	June 16, 1909	Death
Arthur Boyer	Liberal	June 28, 1909	Grey	Laurier	January 24, 1922	Death
Gustave Benjamin Boyer	Liberal	March 11, 1922	Byng	King	December 2, 1927	Death
Lawrence Alexander Wilson	Liberal	June 3, 1930	Willingdon	King	March 3, 1934	Death
Arthur Sauvé	Conservative	July 20, 1935	Bessborough	Bennett	February 6, 1944	Death
Vincent Dupuis	Liberal	April 18, 1945	Athlone	King	May 11, 1967	Death
Lazarus Phillips	Liberal	February 9, 1968	Michener	Pearson	October 10, 1970	Retirement
Carl Goldenberg	Liberal	November 4, 1971	Michener	Trudeau, P. E.	October 20, 1982	Retirement
Jean Le Moyne	Liberal	December 23, 1982	Schreyer	Trudeau, P. E.	February 17, 1988	Retirement
Gérald Beaudoin	Progressive Conservative	September 26, 1988	Sauvé	Mulroney	February 1, 2004	Retirement
Gérald Beaudoin	Conservative	February 2, 2004	Sauvé	Mulroney	April 15, 2004	Retirement
Yoine Goldstein	Liberal	August 29, 2005	Clarkson	Martin	May 11, 2009	Retirement
Jacques Demers	Conservative	August 27, 2009	Jean	Harper	August 25, 2019	Retirement
Jacques Demers	Independent	December 3, 2015	Jean	Harper	August 25, 2019	Retirement
Amina Gerba	Progressive Senate Group	July 29, 2021	Simon	Trudeau, J.	Incumbent	

=== Rougemont ===
The Rougemont Senate division is defined in the Consolidated Statutes of Canada (1859) as "The remainder of the County of St. Hyacinth, the Counties of Rouville and Iberville." The demarcation of the Saurel Senate division provides an explanation of what constitutes "the remainder of the County of St. Hyacinth".

Name	Affiliation	Date appointed/ affiliation change	Appointed by	On the advice of	End of term	Reason
William Henry Chaffers	Liberal	October 23, 1867	Monck	Royal Proclamation	July 19, 1894	Death
William Hales Hingston	Conservative	January 2, 1896	Aberdeen	Bowell	February 19, 1907	Death
Georges-Casimir Dessaulles	Liberal	March 12, 1907	Grey	Laurier	April 19, 1930	Death
Rodolphe Lemieux	Liberal	June 3, 1930	Willingdon	King	September 28, 1937	Death
Élie Beauregard	Liberal	February 9, 1940	Tweedsmuir	King	August 27, 1954	Death
Henri Courtemanche	Progressive Conservative	January 20, 1960	Vanier	Diefenbaker	December 22, 1961	Resignation
Jacques Flynn	Progressive Conservative	November 9, 1962	Vanier	Diefenbaker	August 22, 1990	Resignation
John Sylvain	Progressive Conservative	September 7, 1990	Hnatyshyn	Mulroney	February 1, 1996	Resignation
Shirley Maheu	Liberal	February 1, 1996	LeBlanc	Chrétien	February 2, 2006	Death
Michael Fortier	Conservative	February 27, 2006	Jean	Harper	September 7, 2008	Resignation
Suzanne Duplessis	Conservative	January 14, 2009	Jean	Harper	June 30, 2015	Retirement
Marie-Françoise Mégie	Independent Senators Group	November 25, 2016	Johnston	Trudeau, J.	September 20, 2025	Retirement
Richard Martel	Non-Affiliated	July 24, 2026	Arbour	Carney	Incumbent	
Richard Martel	Conservative	October 6, 2026	Arbour	Carney	Incumbent	

=== Saurel ===
The Saurel Senate division is defined in the Consolidated Statutes of Canada (1859) as "The Counties of Richelieu and Bagot, the Parishes of St. Denis, La Présentation, St. Barnabé, and St. Jude, in the County of St. Hyacinth."

Name	Affiliation	Date appointed/ affiliation change	Appointed by	On the advice of	End of term	Reason
Jean-Baptiste Guevremont	Conservative	October 23, 1867	Monck	Royal Proclamation	June 14, 1896	Resignation
Louis-Joseph Forget	Conservative	June 15, 1896	Aberdeen	Tupper	April 7, 1911	Death
Joseph-Marcellin Wilson	Liberal	May 3, 1911	Grey	Laurier	January 1, 1939	Resignation
Athanase David	Liberal	February 9, 1940	Tweedsmuir	King	January 26, 1953	Death
Mariana Beauchamp Jodoin	Liberal	May 19, 1953	Massey	St. Laurent	June 1, 1966	Resignation
Alan Macnaughton	Liberal	July 8, 1966	Vanier	Pearson	July 30, 1978	Retirement
Fernand Leblanc	Liberal	March 27, 1979	Schreyer	Trudeau, P. E.	July 1, 1992	Retirement
Fernand Roberge	Progressive Conservative	May 26, 1993	Hnatyshyn	Mulroney	July 19, 2000	Resignation
Jean Lapointe	Liberal	June 13, 2001	Clarkson	Chrétien	December 6, 2010	Retirement
Larry Smith	Conservative	December 20, 2010	Johnston	Harper	March 25, 2011	Resignation
Larry Smith	Conservative	May 25, 2011	Johnston	Harper	April 28, 2026	Retirement
Larry Smith	Canadian Senators Group	August 4, 2022	Johnston	Harper	April 28, 2026	Retirement
Larry Smith	Conservative	June 12, 2025	Johnston	Harper	April 28, 2026	Retirement

=== Shawinigan ===
The Shawinigan Senate division is defined in the Consolidated Statutes of Canada (1859) as "The Counties of Champlain and St. Maurice, the Town of Three Rivers, the Parishes of River du Loup, St. Léon, St. Paulin, and the Township of Hunterstown and its augmentation, in the County of Maskinongé."

Name	Affiliation	Date appointed/ affiliation change	Appointed by	On the advice of	End of term	Reason
James Ferrier	Conservative	October 23, 1867	Monck	Royal Proclamation	May 30, 1888	Death
Hippolyte Montplaisir	Liberal-Conservative	February 9, 1891	Stanley	Macdonald	June 20, 1927	Death
Philippe-Jacques Paradis	Liberal	December 14, 1927	Willingdon	King	June 20, 1933	Death
Charles Bourgeois	Conservative	August 15, 1935	Bessborough	Bennett	May 15, 1940	Death
Charles-Édouard Ferland	Liberal	April 18, 1945	Athlone	King	April 18, 1951	Resignation
Léon Méthot	Progressive Conservative	October 12, 1957	Massey	Diefenbaker	August 6, 1972	Death
Maurice Riel	Liberal	October 5, 1973	Michener	Trudeau, P. E.	April 3, 1997	Retirement
Lucie Pépin	Liberal	April 8, 1997	LeBlanc	Chrétien	September 7, 2011	Retirement
Ghislain Maltais	Conservative	January 6, 2012	Johnston	Harper	April 22, 2019	Retirement
Tony Loffreda	Independent	July 23, 2019	Johnston	J. Trudeau	Incumbent	
Tony Loffreda	Independent Senators Group	November 7, 2019	Johnston	J. Trudeau	Incumbent	

=== Stadacona ===
The Stadacona Senate division is defined in the Consolidated Statutes of Canada (1859) as "The remainder of the City and Banlieue of Quebec." The demarcation of the La Salle Senate division provides an explanation of what constitutes the "remainder of the City...of Quebec".

Name	Affiliation	Date appointed/ affiliation change	Appointed by	On the advice of	End of term	Reason
Narcisse-Fortunat Belleau	Conservative	October 23, 1867	Monck	Royal Proclamation	October 23, 1867	Appointment declined
Joseph-Édouard Cauchon	Independent Conservative	November 2, 1867	Monck	Royal Proclamation	June 30, 1872	Resignation
Pierre-Joseph-Olivier Chauveau	Conservative	February 20, 1873	Dufferin	Macdonald	January 8, 1874	Resignation
Pierre Baillargeon	Liberal	March 27, 1874	Dufferin	Mackenzie	December 15, 1891	Death
Auguste Landry	Conservative	February 23, 1892	Stanley	Abbott	December 20, 1919	Death
Lorne Campbell Webster	Conservative	January 10, 1920	Devonshire	Borden	September 27, 1941	Death
Jean-Marie Dessureault	Liberal	June 9, 1945	Athlone	King	August 16, 1970	Resignation
Martial Asselin	Progressive Conservative	September 1, 1972	Michener	Trudeau, P. E.	August 7, 1990	Resignation
Claude Castonguay	Progressive Conservative	September 23, 1990	Hnatyshyn	Mulroney	December 9, 1992	Resignation
Jean-Claude Rivest	Progressive Conservative	March 11, 1993	Hnatyshyn	Mulroney	January 31, 2015	Resignation
Jean-Claude Rivest	Conservative	February 2, 2004	Hnatyshyn	Mulroney	January 31, 2015	Resignation
Jean-Claude Rivest	Independent	August 31, 2004	Hnatyshyn	Mulroney	January 31, 2015	Resignation
Marc Gold	Independent Senators Group	November 25, 2016	Johnston	Trudeau, J.	June 30, 2025	Retirement
Marc Gold	Non-affiliated	January 24, 2020	Johnston	Trudeau, J.	June 30, 2025	Retirement

=== The Laurentides ===
The Senate division of The Laurentides is defined in the Consolidated Statutes of Canada (1859) as "The Counties of Chicoutimi, Charlevoix, Saguenay and Montmorency, the Seigniory of Beauport, the Parish of Charlebourg, the Townships of Stoneham and Tewkesbury, in the County of Quebec."

Name	Affiliation	Date appointed/ affiliation change	Appointed by	On the advice of	End of term	Reason
David Edward Price	Conservative	October 23, 1867	Monck	Royal Proclamation	August 22, 1883	Death
James Gibb Ross	Conservative	January 11, 1884	Lansdowne	Macdonald	October 1, 1888	Death
Evans John Price	Conservative	December 1, 1888	Stanley	Macdonald	August 30, 1899	Death
Joseph Shehyn	Liberal	February 5, 1900	Minto	Laurier	July 14, 1918	Death
Pierre Édouard Blondin	Conservative	July 20, 1918	Devonshire	Borden	October 29, 1943	Death
Télesphore-Damien Bouchard	Liberal	March 3, 1944	Athlone	King	November 13, 1962	Death
Maurice Bourget	Liberal	April 27, 1963	Vanier	Pearson	March 29, 1979	Death
Arthur Tremblay	Progressive Conservative	September 27, 1979	Schreyer	Clark	June 18, 1992	Retirement
In abeyance - the appointment of Normand Grimard to the temporary division of Quebec under section 26 of the Constitution Act, 1867 required this division be left vacant between Tremblay's retirement and Grimard's retirement on June 16, 2000						
Raymond Setlakwe	Liberal	June 20, 2000	Clarkson	Chrétien	July 3, 2003	Retirement
Madeleine Plamondon	Independent	September 9, 2003	Clarkson	Chrétien	September 21, 2006	Retirement
Michel Rivard	Conservative	January 2, 2009	Jean	Harper	August 7, 2016	Retirement
Michel Rivard	Independent	March 8, 2016	Jean	Harper	August 7, 2016	Retirement
Renée Dupuis	Independent Senators Group	November 10, 2016	Johnston	Trudeau, J.	January 17, 2024	Retirement
Pierre Moreau	Progressive Senate Group	September 10, 2024	Simon	Trudeau, J.	Incumbent	

=== Victoria ===
The Victoria Senate division is defined in the Consolidated Statutes of Canada (1859) as "The remainder of the City of Montreal exclusive of the Parish." The demarcation of the Alma Senate division provides an explanation of what constitutes the "remainder of the city of Montreal".

Name	Affiliation	Date appointed/ affiliation change	Appointed by	On the advice of	End of term	Reason
Thomas Ryan	Liberal-Conservative	October 23, 1867	Monck	Royal Proclamation	May 25, 1889	Death
Edward Murphy	Liberal-Conservative	May 30, 1889	Stanley	Macdonald	December 5, 1895	Death
James O'Brien	Liberal-Conservative	January 2, 1896	Aberdeen	Bowell	May 28, 1903	Death
Henry Joseph Cloran	Liberal	June 30, 1903	Minto	Laurier	February 8, 1928	Death
Edmund William Tobin	Liberal	June 3, 1930	Willingdon	King	June 24, 1938	Death
William James Hushion	Liberal	February 15, 1940	Duff^{1}	King	January 29, 1954	Death
John Thomas Hackett	Progressive Conservative	July 28, 1955	Massey	St. Laurent	September 15, 1956	Death
Josie Alice Quart	Progressive Conservative	November 16, 1960	Vanier	Diefenbaker	April 17, 1980	Death
Leo Kolber	Liberal	December 23, 1983	Schreyer	Trudeau, P. E.	January 18, 2004	Retirement
Francis Fox	Liberal	August 29, 2005	Clarkson	Martin	December 2, 2011	Resignation
Jean-Guy Dagenais	Conservative	January 17, 2012	Johnston	Harper	February 2, 2025	Retirement
Jean-Guy Dagenais	Canadian Senators Group	November 18, 2019	Johnston	Harper	February 2, 2025	Retirement
Martine Hébert	Non-affiliated	February 7, 2025	Simon	Trudeau, J.	Incumbent	

Notes:

^{1} Lyman Duff served as acting Governor General from February 11, 1940 to June 21, 1940 in his capacity as Chief Justice of the Supreme Court of Canada

=== Wellington ===
The Wellington Senate division is defined in the Consolidated Statutes of Canada (1859) as "The remainder of the County of Drummond, the County of Richmond, the Town of Sherbrooke, the Counties of Wolfe, Compton, and Stanstead." The demarcation of the De la Vallière Senate division provides an explanation of what constitutes the "remainder of the County of Drummond".

Name	Affiliation	Date appointed/ affiliation change	Appointed by	On the advice of	End of term	Reason
John Sewell Sanborn	Liberal	October 23, 1867	Monck	Royal Proclamation	October 1, 1872	Resignation
Matthew Henry Cochrane	Conservative	October 17, 1872	Dufferin	Macdonald	August 12, 1903	Death
William Mitchell	Liberal	March 5, 1904	Minto	Laurier	May 10, 1926	Death
Wilfrid Laurier McDougald	Liberal	June 25, 1926	Byng	King	May 3, 1932	Resignation
Albert Joseph Brown	Conservative	October 6, 1932	Bessborough	Bennett	November 16, 1938	Death
Charles Benjamin Howard	Liberal	February 9, 1940	Tweedsmuir	King	March 25, 1964	Death
Paul Desruisseaux	Liberal	July 8, 1966	Vanier	Pearson	May 1, 1980	Retirement
Jacques Hébert	Liberal	April 20, 1983	Schreyer	Trudeau, P. E.	June 21, 1998	Retirement
Aurélien Gill	Liberal	September 17, 1998	LeBlanc	Chrétien	August 26, 2008	Retirement
Leo Housakos	Conservative	January 8, 2009	Jean	Harper	Incumbent	

== See also ==
- Lists of Canadian senators
- Canadian Senate divisions
