= Sewell Foster =

Physician and politician in Lower Canada

Stephen Sewell Foster

Member of the Legislative Assembly of the Province of Canada for Shefford
- In office 1841 – 1847 (two elections)
- Preceded by: New position
- Succeeded by: Lewis Thomas Drummond

Coroner
- In office 1859–1868

Personal details
- Born: November 22, 1792 Oakham, Massachusetts, United States
- Died: December 29, 1868 (aged 76) Knowlton, Quebec
- Party: "British" Tory
- Spouse: Sally Belknap
- Relations: Asa Belknap Foster (son)
- Children: 7 sons, 5 daughters
- Profession: Physician

Stephen Sewell Foster (born Sewell Foster) (November 22, 1792 – December 29, 1868) was a medical doctor and political figure in Canada East.

== Family and early life ==
Foster was born in Oakham, Massachusetts in 1792, the son of Samuel Foster and Patty Wilkings. At age 20, he married Sally Belknap. In 1815 he was licensed to practise medicine in Vermont. The couple initially lived in Newfane, Vermont, but in 1822 they emigrated with other Vermont families to the Eastern Townships in Lower Canada. They settled in Frost Village near Waterloo.

== Medical career ==
Foster originally made his living on their farm, but he also attended medical lectures in Quebec. He was licensed to practise medicine in the province in 1830, and began serving a large area in the Eastern Townships, which did not have many doctors. He became known for being willing to travel in unsettled areas where roads were few, on horseback, on foot, and by canoe. His efforts were greatly appreciated by the residents of the area.

In addition to his practice, Foster was also a surgeon for a militia battalion. He continued his medical studies, now at McGill, and earned honorary medical degrees from English and Scottish universities. Once the College of Physicians and Surgeons of Lower Canada was set up in 1847, Foster served as a governor of the College until 1866, when ill-health forced his retirement.

== Public service ==
In 1859, Foster was appointed a coroner for the Bedford District, a position he held until his death in 1868. He was a justice of the peace and commissioner for small causes in Shefford County. He was also one of the founders of the Shefford Academy in Frost Village and served as administrator.

== Political career ==
Encouraged by another of the Vermont immigrant community, Paul Holland Knowlton, Foster stood for election to the Legislative Assembly of Lower Canada in the general elections of 1834. He campaigned as a supporter of the Governor General, but was defeated.

Following the Lower Canada Rebellion in 1837 and 1838, and the similar rebellion in 1837 in Upper Canada (now Ontario), the British government decided to merge the two provinces into a single province, as recommended by Lord Durham in the Durham Report. The Union Act, 1840, passed by the British Parliament, abolished the two provinces and their separate parliaments, and created the Province of Canada, with a single Parliament for the entire province, composed of an elected Legislative Assembly and an appointed Legislative Council. The Governor General initially retained a strong position in the government.

Foster's friend Knowlton had been appointed to the new Legislative Council, and he again encouraged Foster to stand for election, as a supporter of the Governor General, Lord Sydenham. This time, Foster was elected to represent Shefford in the Legislative Assembly.

In the first session of the Legislative Assembly, the major issue was the union of the Canadas. Opponents of the union introduced a motion condemning the way the union had been imposed on the people of Lower Canada. Foster voted in favour of the union and against the motion, which was defeated. During the session, Foster was a consistent supporter of Lord Sydenham and his government, and opposed to the reform program of the Upper Canada reformers and the French-Canadian Group.

Foster was re-elected in 1844. He continued to be a member of the "British Tory" group from Lower Canada, supporting the Governor and opposed to the reformers. Although he consistently supported the governor, Foster did not take a major role in the Assembly. In the general election of 1848, he was defeated by a reform candidate, Lewis Thomas Drummond. Foster was actually glad to return to his medical practice and took no further part in politics.

== Later life and death ==
In 1857, Foster moved to Knowlton where he continued to practise medicine. He continued to be involved in social causes, such as education and temperance, until his death in 1868.

His son Asa Belknap Foster was also a member of the Legislative Assembly and later the Legislative Council. In 1867, he was one of the first appointments to the Senate of Canada.
