= Joseph Arthur Paquet =

Canadian politician

The Hon. Joseph Arthur Paquet
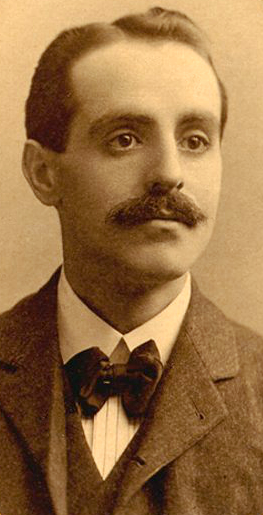

Senator for La Salle, Quebec
- In office 1898–1901
- Appointed by: Wilfrid Laurier
- Preceded by: Pierre Antoine Deblois
- Succeeded by: Joseph Godbout

Personal details
- Born: September 5, 1857 Quebec City, Canada East
- Died: March 29, 1901 (aged 43)
- Party: Liberal

Joseph-Arthur Paquet (September 5, 1857 – March 29, 1901) was a merchant and political figure in Quebec. He sat for La Salle division in the Senate of Canada from 1898 to 1901.

He was born in Quebec City, the son of Zéphirin Paquet and Marie-Louise Hamel, founders of La Compagnie Paquet Limitée, later renamed Compagnie Paquet Limitée. He worked in the retail and fur processing business and was given control of the business by his parents in 1898, becoming President.

Paquet died in office three years later at the age of 43, predeceasing his father.

After his death, control of the family business passed to his sister Joséphine, his brother Joseph-Octave and Caroline Monier, the wife of his brother Zéphirin, who had been individually disinherited and later attempted to obstruct settlement of the estate.
