= Edward Murphy (Canadian senator) =

Canadian politician

The Hon. Edward Murphy

Senator for Victoria, Quebec
- In office 1889–1895
- Appointed by: John A. Macdonald
- Preceded by: Thomas Ryan
- Succeeded by: James O'Brien

Personal details
- Born: July 26, 1818 County Carlow, Ireland
- Died: December 5, 1895 (aged 77) Montreal, Quebec
- Party: Liberal-Conservative

Edward Murphy (July 26, 1818 – December 5, 1895) was a Canadian politician.

Born in County Carlow, Ireland, he emigrated to Lower Canada when he was six. He was appointed to the Senate for the division of Victoria, Quebec on the advice of Sir John A. Macdonald in 1889. A Liberal-Conservative, he served until his death in 1895.

In 1882, he was made a Knight of the Order of the Holy Sepulchre.

There is an Edward Murphy fonds at Library and Archives Canada.
