= John Ewasew =

Canadian lawyer and politician (1922–1978)

The Hon. John Ewasew the second

Senator for Montarville, Quebec
- In office 1976–1978
- Appointed by: Pierre Trudeau
- Preceded by: Louis-Philippe Gélinas
- Succeeded by: Dalia Wood

Personal details
- Born: March 13, 1922 Grenfell, Saskatchewan
- Died: March 26, 1978 (aged 56)
- Party: Liberal

John Ewasew (13 March 1922 – 26 March 1978) was a Canadian lawyer and senator. A Liberal, he was appointed to the Senate of Canada on 17 December 1976 on the recommendation of Pierre Trudeau. He represented the senatorial division of Montarville, Quebec until his death.
