= Hippolyte Montplaisir =

Canadian politician

The Hon. Hippolyte Montplaisir
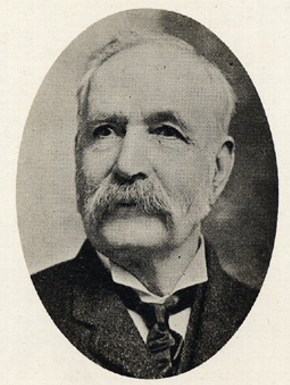

Member of the Canadian Parliament for Champlain
- In office 1874–1891
- Preceded by: John Jones Ross
- Succeeded by: Onésime Carignan

Senator for Shawinegan
- In office 1891–1927
- Appointed by: John A. Macdonald
- Preceded by: James Ferrier
- Succeeded by: Philippe-Jacques Paradis

Personal details
- Born: March 7, 1839 Cap-de-la-Madeleine, Lower Canada
- Died: June 20, 1927 (aged 88) Trois-Rivières, Quebec
- Party: Liberal-Conservative

Hippolyte Montplaisir (March 7, 1839 – June 20, 1927) was a Canadian politician. He became Senator for Shawinegan, and Member of Parliament.

== Background ==
He was born on March 7, 1839, in Cap-de-la-Madeleine, Lower Canada and was the son of Paschal Montplaisir and Victoire Crevier. He was educated at Trois-Rivières and was a farmer. Montplaisir served 25 years as mayor of Cap-de-la-Madeleine and was warden of Champlain County for 6 years. He married E. M. Aylr.

== Political career ==
He was first elected to the House of Commons of Canada for Champlain in the 1874 federal election. A Liberal-Conservative, he was re-elected in 1878, 1882, and 1887. In 1891, he was appointed to the Senate on the advice of John Alexander Macdonald representing the Senatorial Division of Shawinegan, Quebec. He served as an MP and senator for 53 years until his death in 1927.

== Death ==
He died on June 20, 1927 in Trois-Rivières.

== Honors ==
Rue Montplaisir (Montplaisir Street) in Cap-de-la-Madeleine was named to honor him.
