= Thomas Ryan (Quebec politician) =

Canadian politician

The Hon. Thomas Ryan
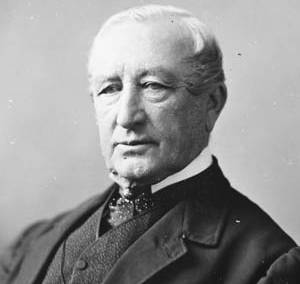

Senator for Victoria, Quebec
- In office 23 October 1867 – 25 May 1889
- Appointed by: Royal Proclamation
- Succeeded by: Edward Murphy

Personal details
- Born: 21 August 1804 Ballinakill, County Kildare, Ireland
- Died: 25 May 1889 (aged 84) Montreal, Quebec
- Party: Liberal-Conservative
- Relations: John B. Ryan (brother)

Thomas Ryan (21 August 1804 – 25 May 1889) was a Quebec businessman and political figure. He was a Liberal-Conservative member of the Senate of Canada for Victoria division from 1867 to 1889.

He was born in Ballinakill, County Kildare, Ireland in 1804 and studied at Clongowes Wood College. Ryan went into the wholesale business at Quebec City in Lower Canada with his brother Edward and later became an agent for Baring Brothers, a commercial banking firm based in London.

Around 1849, he became involved in operating steamboats; he helped form the Canadian Steam Navigation Company in 1853 and later served as a director of the Richelieu and Ontario Navigation Company. Ryan was a director of the Bank of Montreal and served as vice-president for the bank. He was elected president of the Montreal Board of Trade in 1849 and 1850.

Ryan was also an active member of the Irish Catholic community in Montreal. He served as lieutenant-colonel in the local militia and served as consul for France, Denmark, Lübeck, Bremen and Hamburg at Montreal from 1855 to 1861. He was elected to the Legislative Council of the Province of Canada for Victoria division in 1863 and was named to the Senate after Confederation. He died in office at Montreal in 1889.

His brother John B. Ryan was a Lower Canada businessman who took part in the Lower Canada Rebellion.
