= Michel Champagne =

Canadian politician (born 1956)

Member of the Canadian Parliament for Champlain
- In office 1984–1993
- Preceded by: Michel Veillette
- Succeeded by: Réjean Lefebvre

Personal details
- Born: 4 May 1956 (age 70) St-Sévérin de Proulxville, Quebec
- Party: Progressive Conservative

Michel Champagne (born 4 May 1956) was a member of the House of Commons of Canada. He was a businessman, political scientist and teacher by career.

== Early political experience ==
Champagne was the mayor of Saint-Séverin-de-Proulxville from 1981 to his election for the progressive-conservative in 1984.

== Member of the House of Commons ==
Champagne was among moderate supporters of the Quebec sovereignty movement, who gave a chance to the beau risque approach in the aftermath of the 1980 Quebec Referendum.

He successfully ran as a Progressive Conservative candidate in the Quebec riding of Champlain in the 1984 and was re-elected in 1988. Champagne was a member in the 33rd and 34th Canadian Parliaments.

Champagne lost his bid for re-election in 1993, against Bloc Québécois candidate Réjean Lefebvre.

== Provincial politics ==
Champagne ran for the Parti Québécois (PQ) nomination for the 2001 by-election in the district of Laviolette, with the backing of influential party insider and Cabinet Member Gilles Baril. However, local PQ card-carrying supporters chose Yves Demers over him. Demers eventually lost the election against Liberal Julie Boulet.

== Return to municipal politics ==
Michel Champagne ran again for the mayorship of Saint-Séverin in 2009 and he was re-elected without opposition during the municipal election. He became the mayor again 25 years after he left this position to enter federal politics.

== Honors ==
Champagne served as President of the Festival Western de Saint-Tite in 1996 and he was the General Manager in 1997.
