= Philippe-Jacques Paradis =

Canadian politician

The Hon. Philippe-Jacques Paradis
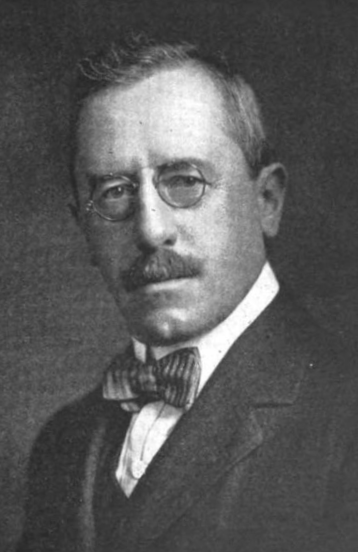

Member of the Legislative Council of Quebec for La Salle
- In office 1917–1927
- Preceded by: Charles-Eugène Dubord
- Succeeded by: Louis-Alfred Létourneau

Senator for Shawinegan, Quebec
- In office 1927–1933
- Appointed by: William Lyon Mackenzie King
- Preceded by: Hippolyte Montplaisir
- Succeeded by: Charles Bourgeois

Personal details
- Born: August 4, 1868 Quebec City, Quebec
- Died: June 20, 1933 (aged 64) Quebec City, Quebec
- Party: Liberal

Philippe-Jacques Paradis (August 4, 1868 – June 20, 1933) was a manufacturer and political figure in Quebec. He sat for Shawinigan division in the Senate of Canada from 1927 to 1933.

He was born in Quebec City, the son of Euclide Paradis and Marie-Louise Jolicœur, and was educated at the Séminaire de Québec and the Université Laval. He married Emma Fraser in 1891. Paradis manufactured asbestos products and was president of an asbestos mining company at Thetford Mines. He was a director for Beauharnois Power, Quebec Power, the Québec and Chibougamau Railway, the Quebec, Saguenay and Shay Lake Railway and Canadian Transcontinental Airways. Paradis was first president of the Commission d'urbanisme de la Ville de Québec. He was editor of the Quebec city newspaper La Vigie. Paradis represented La Salle division in the Legislative Council of Quebec from 1917 to 1927, resigning his seat after he was named to the Senate. He died in office in Quebec City at the age of 64.
