= Jean-Antoine Panet =

Canadian politician (1751–1815)

- Oil painting of Panet by Théophile Hamel

Personal details
- Born: June 8, 1751 Quebec City, New France
- Died: May 17, 1815 (aged 63) Quebec City, Lower Canada
- Relations: Jean-Claude Panet
- Children: Philippe Panet
- Profession: Lawyer

Military service
- Allegiance: Province of Quebec
- Branch/service: Canadian militia
- Rank: Lieutenant-colonel
- Battles/wars: American Revolutionary War: Battle of Quebec (1775)

Jean-Antoine Panet (French pronunciation: [ʒɑ̃ ɑ̃twan panɛ]; June 8, 1751 – May 17, 1815) was a notary, lawyer, judge, seigneur and political figure in Lower Canada.

He was born in Quebec in 1751, the son of Jean-Claude Panet. He served in the militia defending the town of Quebec during the American Revolution and he later attained the rank of Lieutenant-colonel in the militia. Panet entered practice as a notary in 1772, but also began to practice as a lawyer the following year. He became seigneur of Bourg-Louis in 1777. In 1779, he married Louise-Philippe, daughter of Philippe-Louis-François Badelard. Like others in the province, Panet lobbied for a legislative assembly. In 1792, he was elected to the Legislative Assembly of Lower Canada for the Upper Town of Quebec; he was elected as the first speaker for the assembly. In 1794, he was appointed a judge of the Court of Common Pleas and resigned his post as speaker at that time. Panet was also named a judge of the Court of King's Bench for the District of Montreal, but refused this second appointment. He was reelected to the assembly for the Upper Town in 1796, 1800, 1804 and later in 1814. In 1808, he was elected for Huntingdon; he was reelected there in 1809 and 1810. He was elected speaker again in 1797, serving until 1815, when he resigned due to poor health. In 1815, he resigned his seat in the legislative assembly to accept a nomination to the Legislative Council.

He died in office at Quebec in 1815. In 1823 the government awarded his widow an annual pension.

His son Philippe also served in the legislative assembly. His son Louis served in the Senate of Canada. His brother Bernard Claude was archbishop of Quebec and his brother Jacques was a parish priest of Notre-Dame-de-Bon-Secours.
