= James O'Brien (Canadian politician) =

Canadian politician

The Hon. James O'Brien

Senator for Victoria, Quebec
- In office January 2, 1896 – May 28, 1903
- Appointed by: Mackenzie Bowell
- Preceded by: Edward Murphy
- Succeeded by: Henry Joseph Cloran

Personal details
- Born: August 3, 1836 Aughnagar, County Tyrone, Ireland
- Died: May 28, 1903 (aged 66)
- Party: Liberal-Conservative

James O'Brien (August 3, 1836 – May 28, 1903) was a Canadian merchant, wholesaler, and politician.

Born in Aughnagar, County Tyrone, Ireland, O'Brien was educated there and moved to British North America in 1850. In 1858, he started business in the wholesale clothing and dry goods trade in Montreal. He retired from that business in 1893. He was a director of the Montreal City and District Savings Bank, the Royal Victoria Life Insurance Company, and also a member of the Board of Trade. He was a Life Governor of the Montreal General Hospital, of the Western and Notre Dame Hospitals, and a trustee of St. Patrick's Orphan Asylum, and a Governor of Université Laval. He was one of the founders of the Dominion Commercial Travellers' Association. He was appointed to the Senate representing the senatorial division of Victoria, Quebec on the advice of Mackenzie Bowell on January 2, 1896. A Liberal-Conservative, he served 7 years until his death in 1903.
