= Pierre-Édouard Blondin =

Canadian politician (1874–1943)

The Honourable Pierre-Édouard Blondin PC
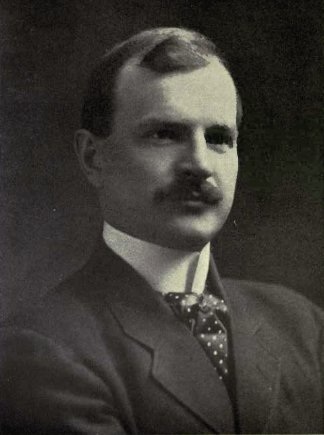

Member of the Canadian Parliament for Champlain
- In office 1908–1917
- Preceded by: Jeffrey Alexandre Rousseau
- Succeeded by: Arthur Lesieur Desaulniers

Senator for The Laurentides, Quebec
- In office 1918–1943
- Appointed by: Robert Borden
- Preceded by: Joseph Shehyn
- Succeeded by: Télésophore Damien Bouchard

Speaker of the Senate of Canada
- In office 1930–1936
- Preceded by: Arthur Charles Hardy
- Succeeded by: Walter Edward Foster

Personal details
- Born: December 14, 1874 St-François du Lac, Quebec
- Died: October 29, 1943 (aged 68)
- Party: Conservative
- Cabinet: Minister of Inland Revenue (1914–1915); Secretary of State of Canada (1915–1917); Minister of Mines (1915–1917); Postmaster General (1917–1921)

Pierre-Édouard Blondin, PC (French pronunciation: [pjɛʁ edwaʁ blɔ̃dɛ̃]; December 14, 1874 – October 29, 1943) was a Canadian politician.

== Biography ==
He was born on December 14, 1874.

He was elected to the House of Commons of Canada representing the Quebec riding of Champlain in 1908 and 1911. A Conservative, he was defeated in Laurier—Outremont during the 1917 wartime election held during the Conscription Crisis of 1917 when conscription was highly unpopular in Quebec.

He held many cabinet positions in Sir Robert Borden's Cabinet, including Postmaster General, Minister of Mines, Secretary of State of Canada, and Minister of Inland Revenue. As well, he was Deputy Speaker and Chairman of Committees of the Whole of the House of Commons.

In March 1917, he resigned his position as Postmaster General of Canada to become a Lieutenant-Colonel in the Canadian Army. He then went on a recruitment tour in a bid to get more French Canadians to join the war effort.

In 1918, he was called to the Senate of Canada, representing the senatorial division of The Laurentides, Quebec, and was re-appointed to the Cabinet as Postmaster General of Canada. From 1930 to 1936, he was the Speaker of the Senate of Canada.

He died in office on October 29, 1943.
