= René Matte (politician) =

Canadian politician

Member of Parliament for Champlain
- In office June 25, 1968 – May 22, 1979
- Preceded by: Jean-Paul Matte
- Succeeded by: Michel Veillette

Personal details
- Born: February 11, 1935; Saint-Casimir, Quebec, Canada
- Died: February 2016; Chambly, Quebec, Canada
- Political party: Ralliement Créditiste
- Occupation: Politician; professor

René Matte (February 11, 1935 – February 2016) was a Canadian politician and professor who served as a member of the House of Commons.

== Political career ==
Before entering electoral politics, Matte was a member of organizations that supported the independence of Quebec: the Ralliement national, the Mouvement Souveraineté-Association, Alliance laurentienne.

At the beginning of the 1960s, for a short time, Matte was active in la Phalange, a minor group of right-wing nationalists. Because of his links to this group, he was arrested in 1963 by the Sûreté du Québec, who suspected him and his brother, Jean-Paul, of being involved in the dismantling of the statue of General Wolfe on the plains of Abraham, Quebec. The two men were released, for lack of evidence.

Matte ran as a Ralliement Créditiste candidate in the federal district of Champlain in the 1968 election and won. His party rejoined the national Social Credit Party of Canada in 1971. He was re-elected in the 1972 and 1974 elections.

He ran for the leadership of the Social Credit Party in 1976 advocating that Canada be divided into five sovereign regions in a loose confederation He placed second to federalist André-Gilles Fortin after several Social Credit MPs threatened to leave the party if Matte won. Matte ran for the leadership again in 1978 but abruptly resigned from the party to sit as an independent when its national executive decided to hold the leadership convention in Winnipeg. Interim leader Charles-Arthur Gauthier stated that Matte was expelled after refusing to follow party discipline for 18 months.

He ran as an independent candidate in the 1979 federal election and was defeated by Liberal candidate Michel Veillette. Matte ran again in 1980 as a New Democratic Party candidate, but finished second.

He died in February 2016 from a serious liver illness in the home of his son, Michel, in Chambly, Quebec.

== Electoral record ==
1974 Canadian federal election: Champlain
Party	Candidate	Votes
Social Credit	René Matte	14,466
Liberal	Laurier Trottier	11,896
Progressive Conservative	Paul-A. Pronovost	2,452
New Democratic	Jean-Guy Landry	716

1979 Canadian federal election: Champlain
Party	Candidate	Votes
Liberal	Michel Veillette	22,256
Independent	René Matte	10,441
Progressive Conservative	Gérard Lamy	4,200
Social Credit	Claude L'Herault	2,796
New Democratic	Denis Tousignant	1,328
Rhinoceros	Gilles Leycuras	753
