= Jeffrey Alexandre Rousseau =

Canadian politician

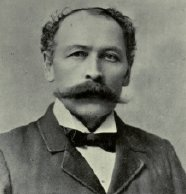

Member of the Canadian Parliament for Champlain
- In office 1900–1908
- Preceded by: François Arthur Marcotte
- Succeeded by: Pierre Édouard Blondin

Personal details
- Born: 22 December 1852
- Died: 22 June 1927 (aged 74)
- Party: Liberal

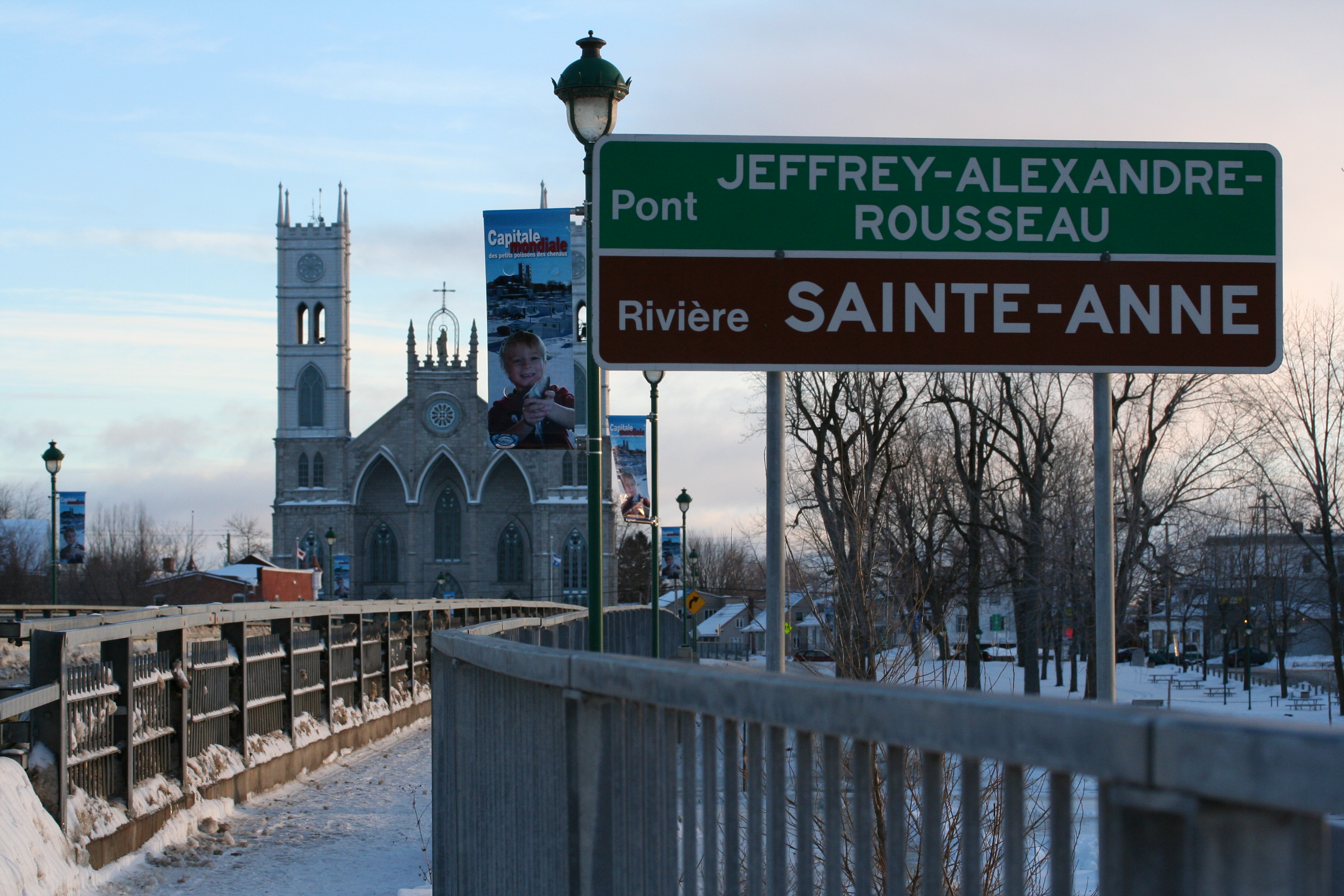
Bridge Jeffrey-Alexandre-Rousseau over Sainte-Anne River (Les Chenaux), Chemin du Roy, Sainte-Anne-de-la-Pérade

Jeffrey Alexandre Rousseau (22 December 1852 – 22 June 1927) was a Canadian politician.

The son of Alexandre Rousseau and Marie Proteau, Rousseau was elected to the House of Commons of Canada for the Quebec electoral district of Champlain in the 1900 federal election. A Liberal, he was re-elected in the 1904 election and was defeated in the 1911 election.

Rousseau was a merchant, farmer, manufacturer and banker. He served as mayor of Sainte-Anne-de-la-Pérade from 1890 to 1896 and from 1904 to 1905. He was married twice: to Hélène-Catherine Hamelin in 1882 and to Corinne Dufresne in 1886.

Rousseau served in the militia during the Fenian raids and later served as lieutenant-colonel for the 4th Regiment of the Chasseurs Canadiens.
