= Paul Lahaye =

Canadian politician (1902–1983)

Member of Parliament for Champlain
- In office March 1958 – June 1962
- Preceded by: Joseph Irenée Rochefort
- Succeeded by: Jean-Paul Matte

Personal details
- Born: 19 April 1902 Batiscan, Quebec, Canada
- Died: 22 April 1983 (aged 81)
- Party: Progressive Conservative
- Spouse(s): Esperance Brunelle m. 26 September 1928
- Profession: Farmer, insurance agent

Paul Lahaye (19 April 1902 – 22 April 1983) was a Progressive Conservative party member of the House of Commons of Canada. Born in Batiscan, Quebec, he was a farmer and life insurance agent by career. From 1922 to 1949, he was secretary-treasurer of his regional school board. Between 1945 and 1948, he was secretary-treasurer of the municipality of Batiscan.

He was first elected at the Champlain riding in the 1958 general election. After serving his only term, the 24th Canadian Parliament, Lahaye was defeated in the 1962 election, finishing in third place behind winner Jean-Paul Matte of the Liberal party and Origène Arvisais of the Social Credit party. Lahaye was also unsuccessful in another attempt to return to Parliament at the Rivière-du-Loup—Témiscouata riding in the 1965 election.
