= François Arthur Marcotte =

Canadian politician

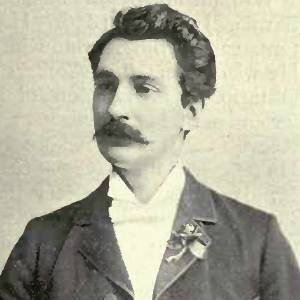

Member of the Canadian Parliament for Champlain
- In office 1896–1900
- Preceded by: Onésime Carignan
- Succeeded by: Jeffrey Alexandre Rousseau

Personal details
- Born: September 25, 1866 Sainte-Anne-de-la-Pérade, Canada East
- Died: January 16, 1931 (aged 64) Quebec City, Quebec
- Party: Conservative

François Arthur Marcotte (September 25, 1866 – January 16, 1931) was a physician and political figure in Quebec. He represented Champlain in the House of Commons of Canada from 1896 to 1900 as a Conservative.

He was born in Sainte-Anne-de-la-Pérade, Canada East, the son of François Marcotte and Cécile Hardy, and was educated at the Séminaire de Québec and the Université Laval. Marcotte set up practice at Sainte-Anne-de-la-Pérade. He was mayor of Sainte-Anne-de-la-Pérade and also served as warden for Champlain County. Marcotte's election in 1896 was overturned after an appeal but he won the by-election that followed in 1897. He was defeated when he ran for reelection in 1900 and 1904. In 1899, he married Anna Marie Larue. Marcotte died at the Hôtel-Dieu in Quebec City at the age of 64.
