= Réjean Lefebvre =

Canadian politician (born 1943)

Member of the Canadian Parliament for Champlain
- In office January 1994 – November 2000
- Preceded by: Michel Champagne
- Succeeded by: Marcel Gagnon

Personal details
- Born: 1 June 1943 (age 82) Saint-Adelphe, Quebec, Canada
- Party: Bloc Québécois; Independent BQ
- Profession: Businessperson, forester

Réjean Lefebvre (French pronunciation: [ʁeʒɑ̃ ləfɛvʁ]; born 1 June 1943) was a member of the House of Commons of Canada from 1993 to 2000. Born in Saint-Adelphe, Quebec, Lefebvre is a businessperson and forester by career.

== Biography ==
Lefebvre was mayor of Saint-Adelphe, Mauricie in 1977, and again from 1985 to 1993, where he laid the groundwork for a major water and sewage project carried out by his successor. He was elected in the Champlain electoral district under the Bloc Québécois (BQ) party in the 1993 and 1997 federal elections, thus serving in the 35th and 36th Canadian Parliaments before leaving Canadian politics.

In late 1998 after, he was arrested for drunken driving for the third time, Lefebvre made the decision to leave the BQ caucus to sit as an Independent.

He sexually assaulted his grand daughters.
