= Asa Belknap Foster =

Canadian politician

The Hon. Asa Belknap Foster
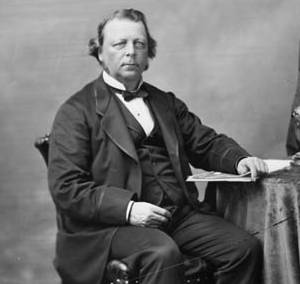

Senator for Bedford, Quebec
- In office October 23, 1867 – February 10, 1876
- Appointed by: Royal Proclamation
- Succeeded by: Gardner Green Stevens

Personal details
- Born: April 21, 1817 Newfane, Vermont
- Died: November 1, 1877 (aged 60) Montreal, Quebec
- Party: Conservative
- Relations: Sewell Foster, father

Asa Belknap Foster (April 21, 1817 – November 1, 1877) was a Quebec businessman and political figure. He represented Bedford division in the Senate of Canada from 1867 to 1876 as a Conservative member.

He was born in Newfane, Vermont in 1817, the son of Sewell Foster, and settled near Waterloo in Lower Canada with his parents in 1822. He worked with his uncle in New England as a railway contractor from 1837 to 1852. He then returned to Waterloo, becoming a merchant and continued to work on railways, including the South Eastern Counties Junction Railway, the Canada Central Railway and the Brockville and Ottawa Railway. He was elected to represent Shefford in the Legislative Assembly in an 1858 by-election; he resigned in 1860 and was elected to the Legislative Council for Bedford. He served until Confederation when he was named to the Senate. He served as lieutenant in the local militia and was elected mayor for Waterloo in 1867. The Conservatives believed that Foster had provided information to the Liberals that led to the Pacific Scandal; this belief was encouraged when Foster was given contracts to construct railways by the Liberals in 1874 and 1875. Foster was bankrupt by 1877 and was briefly imprisoned for debt in Vermont. He died of heart disease in Montreal in 1877.
