= Philippe Panet =

Philippe Panet (February 28, 1791 – January 15, 1855) was a lawyer, judge and political figure in Lower Canada.

He was born at Quebec City in 1791, the son of Jean-Antoine Panet, and studied at the Petit Séminaire de Québec. He began to article in law with his father, but served as a captain in the Quebec militia during the War of 1812 and took part in the Battle of Châteauguay in 1813. He remained in the militia, later becoming lieutenant-colonel.

In 1816, Panet was elected to the Legislative Assembly of Lower Canada for Northumberland and served until 1824, when he was unable to run due to poor health. He completed his training in law and was called to the bar in 1817. In 1819, he married Luce, the daughter of seigneur Pierre Casgrain. In 1830, he was elected to represent Montmorency; he was appointed to the Executive Council in 1831. In the same year, he was named King's Counsel.

Panet resigned his seat in 1832 to accept an appointment as judge in the Court of King's Bench for Quebec district. He served on the Executive Council again in 1838. During the Lower Canada Rebellion, Panet earned the ire of the British authorities by declaring the suspension of habeas corpus by the Special Council in 1838 unconstitutional. Panet and Elzéar Bédard were suspended from their duties as judge by colonial administrator Sir John Colborne. Panet was reinstated as a judge in the Court of Queen's Bench in 1840. He was a member of the Court of Appeal from 1850 until his death at Quebec City in 1855.

His brother Louis later became a member of the Canadian Senate and his brother Charles was a member of the Legislative Assembly of the Province of Canada.
