= Philippe-Louis-François Badelard =

Philippe-Louis-Francois Badelard
- Born: 25 May 1728
- Died: 7 February 1802 (aged 73)

Philippe-Louis-François Badelard (25 May 1728 – 7 February 1802) was an army officer and surgeon from France.

== Biography ==
He came to Louisbourg, Cape Breton Island, in 1757. He was the surgeon-major to the troops there and they left that year for Quebec City in New France. Badelard was taken prisoner at the battle of the Plains of Abraham.

Badelard stayed in Canada under the British régime and was surgeon to the Canadian militia. There he eventually found himself in another conflict. The conflict was the defense of Quebec against the Americans and Richard Montgomery in 1775.

In 1776, Badelard became the surgeon to the Quebec garrison but his contribution to Canadian history came through his research of the Baie-Saint-Paul, Quebec malady which was correctly identified as a venereal disease. As a result of his studies of the illness, he wrote one of the first medical articles published in Canada.

Badelard was active and successful in civilian practice as well and served on the Quebec Medical Board for a time. He was considered to be a highly qualified medical man but a person who was hard to get along with, as reports of the time indicate. Louis-Joseph de Montcalm was the most famous Canadian to complain of this characteristic.
