= List of members of the Canadian House of Commons (S) =

== Saa–San ==
- Jacques Saada b. 1947 first elected in 1997 as Liberal member for Brossard—La Prairie, Quebec.
- Romeo Saganash b. 1961 first elected in 2011 as New Democratic Party member for Abitibi—Baie-James—Nunavik—Eeyou, Quebec.
- Jag Sahota b. 1978 first elected in 2019 as Conservative member for Calgary Skyview, Alberta.
- Ruby Sahota first elected in 2015 as Liberal member for Brampton North, Ontario.
- Gurbux Saini first elected in 2025 as Liberal member for Fleetwood—Port Kells, British Columbia.
- Raj Saini b. 1967 first elected in 2015 as Liberal member for Kitchener Centre, Ontario.
- Harjit Sajjan b. 1970 first elected in 2015 as Liberal member for Vancouver South, British Columbia.
- Ya'ara Saks b. 1973 first elected in 2020 as Liberal member for York Centre, Ontario.
- Thomas Sales b. 1868 first elected in 1921 as Progressive member for Saltcoats, Saskatchewan.
- Max Saltsman b. 1921 first elected in 1964 as New Democratic Party member for Waterloo South, Ontario.
- Joseph Reed Sams b. 1923 first elected in 1962 as Progressive Conservative member for Wentworth, Ontario.
- Cid Samson b. 1943 first elected in 1988 as New Democratic Party member for Timmins—Chapleau, Ontario.
- Darrell Samson b. 1959 first elected in 2015 as Liberal member for Sackville—Preston—Chezzetcook, Nova Scotia.
- John Robbins Sanborn b. 1839 first elected in 1891 as Liberal member for Shefford, Quebec.
- Frederick George Sanderson b. 1870 first elected in 1925 as Liberal member for Perth South, Ontario.
- Jasbir Sandhu b. 1966 first elected as New Democratic Party member for Surrey North, British Columbia.
- Ramesh Sangha b. 1945 first elected as Liberal member for Brampton Centre, Ontario.
- Brigitte Sansoucy b. 1963 first elected as New Democratic Party member for Saint-Hyacinthe—Bagot, Quebec.

== Sar–Sax ==
- Randeep Sarai b. 1975 first elected as Liberal member for Surrey Centre, British Columbia.
- Terry Sargeant b. 1946 first elected in 1979 as New Democratic Party member for Selkirk—Interlake, Manitoba.
- Abdelhaq Sari first elected in 2025 as Liberal member for Bourassa, Quebec.
- Bob Saroya b. 1952 first elected in 2015 as Conservative member for Markham—Unionville, Ontario.
- Benoît Sauvageau b. 1963 first elected in 1993 as Bloc Québécois member for Terrebonne, Quebec.
- Arthur Sauvé b. 1874 first elected in 1930 as Conservative member for Laval—Two Mountains, Quebec.
- Jeanne Sauvé b. 1922 first elected in 1972 as Liberal member for Ahuntsic, Quebec.
- Louis-Philippe Sauvé first elected in 2024 as Bloc Québécois member for LaSalle—Émard—Verdun, Quebec
- Maurice Sauvé b. 1923 first elected in 1962 as Liberal member for Îles-de-la-Madeleine, Quebec.
- Michael Savage b. 1960 first elected in 2004 as Liberal member for Dartmouth—Cole Harbour, Nova Scotia.
- Edmond Savard b. 1862 first elected in 1917 as Laurier Liberal member for Chicoutimi—Saguenay, Quebec.
- Paul Vilmond Savard b. 1864 first elected in 1891 as Liberal member for Chicoutimi—Saguenay, Quebec.
- Pierre Raymond Savard b. 1927 first elected in 1977 as Liberal member for Verdun, Quebec.
- Simon-Pierre Savard-Tremblay b. 1988 first elected in 2019 as Bloc Québécois member for Saint-Hyacinthe—Bagot, Quebec.
- Alfred William Savary b. 1831 first elected in 1867 as Anti-Confederate member for Digby, Nova Scotia.
- Georges-Raoul-Léotale-Guichart-Humbert Saveuse de Beaujeu b. 1847 first elected in 1882 as Conservative member for Soulanges, Quebec.
- Denise Savoie b. 1943 first elected in 2006 as New Democratic Party member for Victoria, British Columbia.
- François Théodore Savoie b. 1846 first elected in 1904 as Liberal member for Mégantic, Quebec.
- Andy Savoy b. 1963 first elected in 2000 as Liberal member for Tobique—Mactaquac, New Brunswick.
- Jake Sawatzky first elected in 2025 as Liberal member for New Westminster—Burnaby—Maillardville, British Columbia.
- Andrew Saxton b. 1964 first elected in 2008 as Conservative member for North Vancouver, British Columbia.

== Sc ==
- Francis Scarpaleggia b. 1957 first elected in 2004 as Liberal member for Lac-Saint-Louis, Quebec.
- William Bain Scarth b. 1837 first elected in 1887 as Conservative member for Winnipeg, Manitoba.
- Robert Colin Scatcherd b. 1832 first elected in 1876 as Liberal member for Middlesex North, Ontario.
- Thomas Scatcherd b. 1823 first elected in 1867 as Liberal member for Middlesex North, Ontario.
- Frederick Laurence Schaffner b. 1855 first elected in 1904 as Conservative member for Souris, Manitoba.
- Andrew Scheer b. 1979 first elected in 2004 as Conservative member for Regina—Qu'Appelle, Saskatchewan.
- Jacob Thomas Schell b. 1850 first elected in 1900 as Liberal member for Glengarry, Ontario.
- Malcolm Smith Schell b. 1855 first elected in 1904 as Liberal member for Oxford South, Ontario.
- Ted Schellenberg b. 1952 first elected in 1984 as Progressive Conservative member for Nanaimo—Alberni, British Columbia.
- Gary Schellenberger b. 1943 first elected in 2003 as Progressive Conservative member for Perth—Middlesex, Ontario.
- Stanley Schellenberger b. 1948 first elected in 1972 as Progressive Conservative member for Wetaskiwin, Alberta.
- Hélène Scherrer b. 1950 first elected in 2000 as Liberal member for Louis-Hébert, Quebec.
- Peter Schiefke b. 1979 first elected in 2015 as Liberal member for Vaudreuil—Soulanges, Quebec.
- Jamie Schmale first elected in 2015 as Conservative member for Haliburton—Kawartha Lakes—Brock, Ontario.
- Werner Schmidt b. 1932 first elected in 1993 as Reform member for Okanagan Centre, British Columbia.
- Larry Schneider b. 1938 first elected in 1988 as Progressive Conservative member for Regina—Wascana, Saskatchewan.
- Norman C. Schneider b. 1888 first elected in 1952 as Liberal member for Waterloo North, Ontario.
- Edward Schreyer b. 1935 first elected in 1965 as New Democratic Party member for Springfield, Manitoba.
- James Duncan Schroder b. 1918 first elected in 1980 as Liberal member for Guelph, Ontario.
- Deborah Schulte b. 1960 first elected in 2015 as Liberal member for King—Vaughan, Ontario.
- John Christian Schultz b. 1840 first elected in 1871 as Conservative member for Lisgar, Manitoba.
- Jacob Schulz b. 1901 first elected in 1957 as Cooperative Commonwealth Federation member for Springfield, Manitoba.
- Stanley Stanford Schumacher b. 1933 first elected in 1968 as Progressive Conservative member for Palliser, Alberta.
- Andy Scott b. 1955 first elected in 1993 as Liberal member for Fredericton—York—Sunbury, New Brunswick.
- Craig Scott b. 1962 first elected in 2012 as New Democratic Party member for Toronto—Danforth, Ontario.
- Frank Stewart Scott b. 1879 first elected in 1915 as Conservative member for Waterloo South, Ontario.
- Geoffrey Douglas Scott b. 1938 first elected in 1978 as Progressive Conservative member for Hamilton—Wentworth, Ontario.
- Michael G. Scott b. 1954 first elected in 1993 as Reform member for Skeena, British Columbia.
- Reid Scott b. 1926 first elected in 1962 as New Democratic Party member for Danforth, Ontario.
- Thomas Scott b. 1841 first elected in 1880 as Conservative member for Selkirk, Manitoba.
- Walter Scott b. 1867 first elected in 1900 as Liberal member for Assiniboia West, Northwest Territories.
- William C. Scott b. 1921 first elected in 1965 as Progressive Conservative member for Victoria, Ontario.
- Jack Scowen b. 1935 first elected in 1984 as Progressive Conservative member for Mackenzie, Saskatchewan.
- Julius Scriver b. 1826 first elected in 1869 as Liberal member for Huntingdon, Quebec.

== Se ==
- Joseph Emm Seagram b. 1841 first elected in 1896 as Conservative member for Waterloo North, Ontario.
- William Oscar Sealey b. 1859 first elected in 1908 as Liberal member for Wentworth, Ontario.
- Kyle Seeback b. 1970 first elected in 2011 as Conservative member for Brampton West, Ontario.
- Paul-Arthur Séguin b. 1875 first elected in 1908 as Liberal member for L'Assomption, Quebec.
- Lou Sekora b. 1931 first elected in 1998 as Liberal member for Port Moody—Coquitlam, British Columbia.
- Djaouida Sellah first elected in 2011 as New Democratic Party member for Saint-Bruno—Saint-Hubert, Quebec.
- Andrew Semple b. 1837 first elected in 1887 as Liberal member for Wellington Centre, Ontario.
- Louis Adélard Sénécal b. 1829 first elected in 1867 as Conservative member for Drummond—Arthabaska, Quebec.
- Mark Cecil Senn b. 1878 first elected in 1921 as Conservative member for Haldimand, Ontario.
- Benoît Serré b. 1951 first elected in 1993 as Liberal member for Timiskaming—French River, Ontario.
- Gaetan Serré b. 1938 first elected in 1968 as Liberal member for Nickel Belt, Ontario.
- Marc Serré b. 1967 first elected in 2015 as Liberal member for Nickel Belt, Ontario.
- Albert Sévigny b. 1881 first elected in 1911 as Conservative member for Dorchester, Quebec.
- Pierre Sévigny b. 1917 first elected in 1958 as Progressive Conservative member for Longueuil, Quebec.
- Edward James Sexsmith b. 1865 first elected in 1921 as Progressive member for Lennox and Addington, Ontario.
- John Albert Sexsmith b. 1866 first elected in 1908 as Conservative member for Peterborough East, Ontario.

== Sg ==
- Judy Sgro b. 1944 first elected in 1999 as Liberal member for York West, Ontario.

== Sh ==
- Tanveer Shahnawaz first elected in 2026 as Liberal member for Beaches—East York, Ontario.
- Noah Shakespeare b. 1839 first elected in 1882 as Conservative member for Victoria, British Columbia.
- Brenda Shanahan b. 1958 first elected in 2015 as Liberal member for Châteauguay—Lacolle, Quebec.
- Walter Shanly b. 1817 first elected in 1867 as Conservative member for Grenville South, Ontario.
- Mitchell Sharp b. 1911 first elected in 1963 as Liberal member for Eglinton, Ontario.
- Samuel Simpson Sharpe b. 1873 first elected in 1908 as Conservative member for Ontario North, Ontario.
- William Henry Sharpe b. 1868 first elected in 1908 as Conservative member for Lisgar, Manitoba.
- Frank Thomas Shaver b. 1881 first elected in 1930 as Conservative member for Stormont, Ontario.
- Alexander Shaw b. 1833 first elected in 1878 as Liberal-Conservative member for Bruce South, Ontario.
- Frederick Davis Shaw b. 1909 first elected in 1940 as Social Credit member for Red Deer, Alberta.
- Hugh Murray Shaw b. 1876 first elected in 1917 as Unionist member for Macleod, Alberta.
- Joseph Tweed Shaw b. 1883 first elected in 1921 as Labour member for Calgary West, Alberta.
- Gail Shea b. 1959 first elected in 2008 as Conservative member for Egmont, Prince Edward Island.
- Charles Sheard b. 1857 first elected in 1917 as Unionist member for Toronto South, Ontario.
- Terry Sheehan b. 1970 first elected in 2015 as Liberal member for Sault Ste. Marie, Ontario.
- Alex Shepherd b. 1946 first elected in 1993 as Liberal member for Durham, Ontario.
- Francis Henry Shepherd b. 1857 first elected in 1911 as Conservative member for Nanaimo, British Columbia.
- Georgette Sheridan b. 1952 first elected in 1993 as Liberal member for Saskatoon—Humboldt, Saskatchewan.
- Louis Ralph Sherman b. 1926 first elected in 1965 as Progressive Conservative member for Winnipeg South, Manitoba.
- John Sherritt b. 1851 first elected in 1900 as Conservative member for Middlesex North, Ontario.
- Schuyler Shibley b. 1820 first elected in 1872 as Liberal-Conservative member for Addington, Ontario.
- Jack Shields b. 1929 first elected in 1980 as Progressive Conservative member for Athabaska, Alberta.
- Martin Shields b. 1948 first elected in 2015 as Conservative member for Bow River, Alberta.
- Nelly Shin b. 1972 first elected in 2019 as Conservative member for Port Moody—Coquitlam, British Columbia.
- Bev Shipley b. 1947 first elected in 2006 as Conservative member for Lambton—Kent—Middlesex, Ontario.
- Doug Shipley b. 1966 first elected in 2019 as Conservative member for Barrie—Springwater—Oro-Medonte, Ontario.
- Marie Ann Shipley b. 1899 first elected in 1953 as Liberal member for Timiskaming, Ontario.
- Harry Bernard Short b. 1864 first elected in 1925 as Conservative member for Digby—Annapolis, Nova Scotia.
- John Short b. 1836 first elected in 1875 as Conservative member for Gaspé, Quebec.
- Devinder Shory b. 1958 first elected in 2008 as Conservative member for Calgary Northeast, Alberta.
- Yuri Shymko b. 1940 first elected in 1978 as Progressive Conservative member for Parkdale, Ontario.

== Sid–Sim ==
- Tom Siddon b. 1941 first elected in 1978 as Progressive Conservative member for Burnaby—Richmond—Delta, British Columbia.
- Jati Sidhu b. 1952 first elected in 2015 as Liberal member for Mission—Matsqui—Fraser Canyon, British Columbia.
- Maninder Sidhu b, 1984 first elected in 2019 as Liberal member for Brampton East, Ontario.
- Sonia Sidhu b. 1968 first elected in 2015 as Liberal member for Brampton South, Ontario.
- Arthur Lewis Sifton b. 1858 first elected in 1917 as Unionist member for Medicine Hat, Alberta.
- Clifford Sifton b. 1861 first elected in 1896 as Liberal member for Brandon, Manitoba.
- Gagan Sikand b. 1984 first elected in 2015 as Liberal member for Mississauga—Streetsville, Ontario.
- Bill Siksay b. 1955 first elected in 2004 as New Democratic Party member for Burnaby—Douglas, British Columbia.
- Mario Silva b. 1966 first elected in 2004 as Liberal member for Davenport, Ontario.
- Jim Silye b. 1946 first elected in 1993 as Reform member for Calgary Centre, Alberta.
- Christian Simard b. 1954 first elected in 2004 as Bloc Québécois member for Beauport, Quebec.
- Georges-Honoré Simard b. 1817 first elected in 1867 as Conservative member for Quebec-Centre, Quebec.
- Henry Simard b. 1836 first elected in 1891 as Liberal member for Charlevoix, Quebec.
- Joseph Alcide Simard b. 1907 first elected in 1965 as Ralliement Créditiste member for Lac-Saint-Jean, Quebec.
- Mario Simard first elected in 2019 as Bloc Québécois member for Jonquière, Quebec.
- Raymond Simard b. 1958 first elected in 2002 as Liberal member for Saint Boniface, Manitoba.
- James Aubrey Simmons b. 1897 first elected in 1949 as Liberal member for Yukon—Mackenzie River, Northwest Territories.
- Oliver Simmons b. 1835 first elected in 1900 as Conservative member for Lambton East, Ontario.
- Roger Simmons b. 1939 first elected in 1979 as Liberal member for Burin—St. George's, Newfoundland and Labrador.
- Scott Simms b. 1970 first elected in 2004 as Liberal member for Bonavista—Exploits, Newfoundland and Labrador.
- John Thomas Simpson b. 1870 first elected in 1930 as Conservative member for Simcoe North, Ontario.
- Robert Simpson b. 1910 first elected in 1957 as Progressive Conservative member for Churchill, Manitoba.
- Thomas Edward Simpson b. 1873 first elected in 1917 as Unionist member for Algoma West, Ontario.
- Wemyss Mackenzie Simpson b. 1825 first elected in 1867 as Conservative member for Algoma, Ontario.
- Jinny Sims b. 1952 first elected in 2011 as New Democratic Party member for Newton—North Delta, British Columbia.
- Michelle Simson b. 1953 first elected in 2008 as Liberal member for Scarborough Southwest, Ontario.

== Sin–Sit ==
- Duncan Sinclair b. 1869 first elected in 1925 as Conservative member for Wellington North, Ontario.
- Duncan James Sinclair b. 1867 first elected in 1921 as Liberal member for Oxford North, Ontario.
- James Sinclair b. 1908 first elected in 1940 as Liberal member for Vancouver North, British Columbia.
- John Ewen Sinclair b. 1879 first elected in 1917 as Laurier Liberal member for Queen's, Prince Edward Island.
- John Howard Sinclair b. 1848 first elected in 1904 as Liberal member for Guysborough, Nova Scotia.
- Peter Sinclair b. 1819 first elected in 1873 as Liberal member for Queen's County, Prince Edward Island.
- Peter Sinclair b. 1887 first elected in 1935 as Liberal member for Queen's, Prince Edward Island.
- William Edmund Newton Sinclair b. 1873 first elected in 1945 as Liberal member for Ontario, Ontario.
- Nathalie Sinclair-Desgagné b. 1988 first elected in 2021 as Bloc Québécois member for Terrebonne.
- Jagmeet Singh b. 1979 first elected in 2019 as New Democratic Party member for Burnaby South, British Columbia.
- John Sylvester Aloysius Sinnott b. 1905 first elected in 1945 as Liberal member for Springfield, Manitoba.
- John Sissons b. 1892 first elected in 1940 as Liberal member for Peace River, Alberta.
- Rathika Sitsabaiesan b. 1981 first elected in 2011 as New Democratic Party member for Scarborough—Rouge River.

== Sk ==
- Ray Skelly b. 1941 first elected in 1979 as New Democratic Party member for Comox—Powell River, British Columbia.
- Bob Skelly b. 1943 first elected in 1988 as New Democratic Party member for Comox—Alberni, British Columbia.
- Carol Skelton b. 1945 first elected in 2000 as Canadian Alliance member for Saskatoon—Rosetown—Biggar, Saskatchewan.
- Lawrence Wilton Skey b. 1911 first elected in 1945 as Progressive Conservative member for Trinity, Ontario.
- Charles Nelson Skinner b. 1833 first elected in 1887 as Liberal member for City and County of St. John, New Brunswick.
- James Atchison Skinner b. 1826 first elected in 1874 as Liberal member for Oxford South, Ontario.
- John Skoberg b. 1926 first elected in 1968 as New Democratic Party member for Moose Jaw, Saskatchewan.
- Roseanne Skoke b. 1954 first elected in 1993 as Liberal member for Central Nova, Nova Scotia.
- William Skoreyko b. 1922 first elected in 1958 as Progressive Conservative member for Edmonton East, Alberta.

== Sl ==
- Arthur Graeme Slaght b. 1877 first elected in 1935 as Liberal member for Parry Sound, Ontario.
- Derek Sloan b. 1984 first elected in 2019 as Conservative member for Hastings—Lennox and Addington, Ontario.
- William Sloan b. 1867 first elected in 1904 as Liberal member for Comox—Atlin, British Columbia.
- Joseph Slogan b. 1931 first elected in 1958 as Progressive Conservative member for Springfield, Manitoba.

== Sm ==
- Clifford Small first elected in 2021 as Conservative member for Coast of Bays—Central—Notre Dame, Newfoundland and Labrador.
- John Small b. 1831 first elected in 1882 as Conservative member for Toronto East, Ontario.
- Robert Hardy Small b. 1891 first elected in 1953 as Progressive Conservative member for Danforth, Ontario.
- Clifford Smallwood b. 1915 first elected in 1958 as Progressive Conservative member for Battle River—Camrose, Alberta.
- Mark Smerchanski b. 1914 first elected in 1968 as Liberal member for Provencher, Manitoba.
- Albert James Smith b. 1822 first elected in 1867 as Liberal member for Westmorland, New Brunswick.
- Alexander Wilson Smith b. 1856 first elected in 1908 as Liberal member for Middlesex North, Ontario.
- Arnold Neilson Smith b. 1889 first elected in 1926 as Liberal member for Stormont, Ontario.
- Arthur Ryan Smith b. 1919 first elected in 1957 as Progressive Conservative member for Calgary South, Alberta.
- Arthur LeRoy Smith b. 1886 first elected in 1945 as Progressive Conservative member for Calgary West, Alberta.
- Benjamin Franklin Smith b. 1865 first elected in 1930 as Conservative member for Victoria—Carleton, New Brunswick.
- Cecil Morris Smith b. 1927 first elected in 1974 as Progressive Conservative member for Churchill, Manitoba.
- David Smith b. 1963 first elected in 2004 as Liberal member for Pontiac, Quebec.
- David Paul Smith b. 1941 first elected in 1980 as Liberal member for Don Valley East, Ontario.
- Donald Smith b. 1905 first elected in 1949 as Liberal member for Queens—Shelburne, Nova Scotia.
- Donald Alexander Smith b. 1820 first elected in 1871 as Independent Conservative member for Selkirk, Manitoba.
- E. D. Smith b. 1853 first elected in 1900 as Conservative member for Wentworth South, Ontario.
- G.A. Percy Smith b. 1922 first elected in 1968 as Liberal member for Northumberland—Miramichi, New Brunswick.
- George Smith b. 1852 first elected in 1905 as Liberal member for Oxford North, Ontario.
- Heber Edgar Smith b. 1915 first elected in 1957 as Progressive Conservative member for Simcoe North, Ontario.
- James A. Smith b. 1911 first elected in 1955 as Social Credit member for Battle River—Camrose, Alberta.
- John Smith b. 1894 first elected in 1957 as Progressive Conservative member for Lincoln, Ontario.
- John Eachern Smith b. 1901 first elected in 1945 as Liberal member for York North, Ontario.
- John James Smith b. 1912 first elected in 1949 as Liberal member for Moose Mountain, Saskatchewan.
- Joy Smith b. 1947 first elected in 2004 as Conservative member for Kildonan—St. Paul, Manitoba.
- Ralph Smith b. 1858 first elected in 1900 as Liberal member for Vancouver, British Columbia.
- Robert Smith b. 1819 first elected in 1872 as Liberal member for Peel, Ontario.
- Robert Smith b. 1858 first elected in 1908 as Liberal member for Stormont, Ontario.
- Robert Knowlton Smith b. 1887 first elected in 1925 as Conservative member for Cumberland, Nova Scotia.
- Sidney Earle Smith b. 1897 first elected in 1957 as Progressive Conservative member for Hastings—Frontenac, Ontario.
- Walter Bernard Smith b. 1912 first elected in 1968 as Liberal member for Saint-Jean, Quebec.
- William Smith b. 1847 first elected in 1887 as Conservative member for Ontario South, Ontario.
- William Murray Smith b. 1930 first elected in 1958 as Progressive Conservative member for Winnipeg North, Manitoba.
- Franklin Smoke b. 1860 first elected in 1925 as Conservative member for Brant, Ontario.
- Henry Smyth b. 1841 first elected in 1882 as Conservative member for Kent, Ontario.
- William Ross Smyth b. 1857 first elected in 1908 as Conservative member for Algoma East, Ontario.

== Sn ==
- John Goodall Snetsinger b. 1833 first elected in 1896 as Liberal member for Cornwall and Stormont, Ontario.
- George Snider b. 1813 first elected in 1867 as Liberal member for Grey North, Ontario.
- Jabez Bunting Snowball b. 1837 first elected in 1878 as Liberal member for Northumberland, New Brunswick.
- William Bunting Snowball b. 1861 first elected in 1924 as Liberal member for Northumberland, New Brunswick.

== So ==
- Patrick Sobeski b. 1951 first elected in 1988 as Progressive Conservative member for Cambridge, Ontario.
- Amandeep Sodhi first elected in 2025 as Liberal member for Brampton Centre, Ontario.
- René Soetens b. 1948 first elected in 1988 as Progressive Conservative member for Ontario, Ontario.
- Amarjeet Sohi b. 1964 first elected in 2015 as Liberal member for Edmonton Mill Woods, Alberta.
- Monte Solberg b. 1958 first elected in 1993 as Reform member for Medicine Hat, Alberta.
- Evan Solomon b. 1968 first elected in 2025 as Liberal member for Toronto Centre, Ontario.
- John Solomon b. 1950 first elected in 1993 as New Democratic Party member for Regina—Lumsden, Saskatchewan.
- James Somerville b. 1834 first elected in 1882 as Liberal member for Brant North, Ontario.
- James Somerville b. 1826 first elected in 1882 as Liberal member for Bruce West, Ontario.
- Bert H. Soper b. 1884 first elected in 1940 as Liberal member for Lanark, Ontario.
- Robert Sopuck b. 1951 first elected in 2010 as Conservative member for Dauphin—Swan River—Marquette, Manitoba.
- Francesco Sorbara b. 1971 first elected in 2015 as Liberal member for Vaughan—Woodbridge, Ontario.
- Kevin Sorenson b. 1958 first elected in 2000 as Canadian Alliance member for Crowfoot, Alberta.
- Gerald Soroka first elected in 2019 as Conservative member for Yellowhead, Alberta.
- Charles Sousa b. 1958 first elected in 2022 as Liberal member for Mississauga—Lakeshore, Ontario.
- Richard Russell Southam b. 1907 first elected in 1958 as Progressive Conservative member for Moose Mountain, Saskatchewan.

== Sp ==
- William Spankie b. 1859 first elected in 1929 as Conservative member for Frontenac—Addington, Ontario.
- Bobbie Sparrow b. 1935 first elected in 1984 as Progressive Conservative member for Calgary South, Alberta.
- Ray Speaker b. 1935 first elected in 1993 as Reform member for Lethbridge, Alberta.
- Alfred Speakman b. 1880 first elected in 1921 as United Farmers of Alberta member for Red Deer, Alberta.
- James Stanley Speakman b. 1906 first elected in 1958 as Progressive Conservative member for Wetaskiwin, Alberta.
- Robert Speller b. 1956 first elected in 1988 as Liberal member for Haldimand—Norfolk, Ontario.
- David Spence b. 1867 first elected in 1921 as Conservative member for Parkdale, Ontario.
- George Spence b. 1879 first elected in 1925 as Liberal member for Maple Creek, Saskatchewan.
- Paul-Henri Spence b. 1906 first elected in 1952 as Progressive Conservative member for Roberval, Quebec.
- Henry Elvins Spencer b. 1882 first elected in 1921 as Progressive member for Battle River, Alberta.
- Larry Spencer b. 1941 first elected in 2000 as Canadian Alliance member for Regina—Lumsden—Lake Centre, Saskatchewan.
- Norman Leonard Spencer b. 1902 first elected in 1958 as Progressive Conservative member for Essex West, Ontario.
- Sven Spengemann b. 1966 first elected in 2015 as Liberal member for Mississauga—Lakeshore, Ontario.
- John Drew Sperry b. 1851 first elected in 1909 as Liberal member for Lunenburg, Nova Scotia.
- Chris Speyer b. 1941 first elected in 1979 as Progressive Conservative member for Cambridge, Ontario.
- Edgar Keith Spinney b. 1851 first elected in 1917 as Unionist member for Yarmouth and Clare, Nova Scotia.
- Philip Howard Spohn b. 1842 first elected in 1891 as Liberal member for Simcoe East, Ontario.
- George Spotton b. 1877 first elected in 1927 as Conservative member for Huron North, Ontario.
- Lewis Springer b. 1835 first elected in 1882 as Liberal member for Wentworth South, Ontario.
- Alexander Sproat b. 1834 first elected in 1867 as Conservative member for Bruce North, Ontario.
- John Thomas Sproule b. 1876 first elected in 1930 as Conservative member for Lambton East, Ontario.
- Thomas Simpson Sproule b. 1843 first elected in 1878 as Conservative member for Grey East, Ontario.

== St–Sta ==
- Thierry St-Cyr b. 1977 first elected in 2006 as Bloc Québécois member for Jeanne-Le Ber, Quebec.
- Lise St-Denis b. 1940 first elected in 2011 as New Democratic Party member for Saint-Maurice—Champlain, Quebec.
- Caroline St-Hilaire b. 1969 first elected in 1997 as Bloc Québécois member for Longueuil, Quebec.
- Diane St-Jacques b. 1953 first elected in 1997 as Progressive Conservative member for Shefford, Quebec.
- Pierre St-Jean b. 1833 first elected in 1874 as Liberal member for City of Ottawa, Ontario.
- Guy St-Julien b. 1940 first elected in 1984 as Progressive Conservative member for Abitibi, Quebec.
- Bernard St-Laurent b. 1953 first elected in 1993 as Bloc Québécois member for Manicouagan, Quebec.
- Jean-Paul St-Laurent b. 1912 first elected in 1955 as Liberal member for Témiscouata, Quebec.
- Louis St-Laurent b. 1882 first elected in 1942 as Liberal member for Quebec East, Quebec.
- Pascale St-Onge b. 1977 first elected in 2021 as Liberal member for Brome—Missisquoi, Quebec.
- Édouard-Charles St-Père b. 1876 first elected in 1921 as Liberal member for Hochelaga, Quebec.
- Lloyd St. Amand b. 1952 first elected in 2004 as Liberal member for Brant, Ontario.
- Brent St. Denis b. 1950 first elected in 1993 as Liberal member for Algoma, Ontario.
- Gerry St. Germain b. 1937 first elected in 1983 as Progressive Conservative member for Mission—Port Moody, British Columbia.
- Éric St-Pierre first elected in 2025 as Liberal member for Honoré-Mercier, Quebec.
- Paul St. Pierre b. 1923 first elected in 1968 as Liberal member for Coast Chilcotin, British Columbia.
- Frank Bainard Stacey b. 1859 first elected in 1917 as Unionist member for Westminster District, British Columbia.
- Reginald Stackhouse b. 1925 first elected in 1972 as Progressive Conservative member for Scarborough East, Ontario.
- Harold Edwin Stafford b. 1921 first elected in 1965 as Liberal member for Elgin, Ontario.
- John Fitz William Stairs b. 1848 first elected in 1883 as Conservative member for Halifax, Nova Scotia.
- Robert Stanbury b. 1929 first elected in 1965 as Liberal member for York—Scarborough, Ontario.
- Frank Thomas Stanfield b. 1903 first elected in 1945 as Progressive Conservative member for Colchester—Hants, Nova Scotia.
- John Stanfield b. 1868 first elected in 1907 as Conservative member for Colchester, Nova Scotia.
- Robert Stanfield b. 1914 first elected in 1967 as Progressive Conservative member for Colchester—Hants, Nova Scotia.
- George Douglas Stanley b. 1876 first elected in 1930 as Conservative member for Calgary East, Alberta.
- John Lawrence Stansell b. 1875 first elected in 1921 as Conservative member for Elgin East, Ontario.
- Bruce Stanton b. 1957 first elected in 2006 as Conservative member for Simcoe North, Ontario.
- Hayden Stanton b. 1898 first elected in 1953 as Progressive Conservative member for Leeds, Ontario.
- Joseph Staples b. 1826 first elected in 1872 as Conservative member for Victoria North, Ontario.
- William D. Staples b. 1868 first elected in 1904 as Conservative member for Macdonald, Manitoba.
- Michael Starr b. 1910 first elected in 1952 as Progressive Conservative member for Ontario, Ontario.

== Ste–Stev ==
- Gabriel Ste-Marie first elected in 2015 as Bloc Québécois member for Joliette, Quebec.
- Louis Sainte-Marie b. 1835 first elected in 1887 as Liberal member for Napierville, Quebec.
- George McClellan Stearns b. 1901 first elected in 1958 as Progressive Conservative member for Compton—Frontenac, Quebec.
- Paul Steckle b. 1942 first elected in 1993 as Liberal member for Huron—Bruce, Ontario.
- James Steedsman b. 1864 first elected in 1921 as Progressive member for Souris, Manitoba.
- Michael Steele b. 1861 first elected in 1911 as Conservative member for Perth South, Ontario.
- Eric Stefanson, Sr. b. 1913 first elected in 1958 as Progressive Conservative member for Selkirk, Manitoba.
- Peter Stefura b. 1923 first elected in 1957 as Social Credit member for Vegreville, Alberta.
- Charles Adolphe Stein b. 1878 first elected in 1920 as Liberal member for Kamouraska, Quebec.
- Warren Steinley b. 1982 first elected in 2019 as Conservative member for Regina—Lewvan, Saskatchewan.
- Fred Stenson b. 1914 first elected in 1962 as Progressive Conservative member for Peterborough, Ontario.
- Michael Thomas Stenson b. 1838 first elected in 1896 as Liberal member for Richmond—Wolfe, Quebec.
- George Stephens b. 1846 first elected in 1900 as Liberal member for Kent, Ontario.
- Charles Elwood Stephenson b. 1898 first elected in 1945 as Progressive Conservative member for Durham, Ontario.
- Rufus Stephenson b. 1835 first elected in 1867 as Conservative member for Kent, Ontario.
- Wayne Stetski b. 1952 first elected in 2015 as New Democratic Party member for Kootenay—Columbia, British Columbia.
- Henry Herbert Stevens b. 1878 first elected in 1911 as Conservative member for Vancouver City, British Columbia.
- Sinclair Stevens b. 1927 first elected in 1972 as Progressive Conservative member for York—Simcoe, Ontario.
- James Stevenson b. 1827 first elected in 1887 as Conservative member for Peterborough West, Ontario.
- Kenneth Ross Stevenson b. 1942 first elected in 1988 as Progressive Conservative member for Durham, Ontario.
- William Stevenson first elected in 2025 as Conservative member for Yellowhead, Alberta.

== Stewart ==
- Alan Carl Stewart b. 1893 first elected in 1949 as Liberal member for Yorkton, Saskatchewan.
- Alistair McLeod Stewart b. 1905 first elected in 1945 as Cooperative Commonwealth Federation member for Winnipeg North, Manitoba.
- Charles A. Stewart b. 1868 first elected in 1922 as Liberal member for Argenteuil, Quebec.
- Charles Wallace Stewart b. 1885 first elected in 1921 as Progressive member for Humboldt, Saskatchewan.
- Christine Stewart b. 1941 first elected in 1988 as Liberal member for Northumberland, Ontario.
- Craig Stewart b. 1928 first elected in 1968 as Progressive Conservative member for Marquette, Manitoba.
- Don Stewart first elected in 2024 as Conservative member for Toronto—St. Paul's, Ontario
- Dugald Stewart b. 1862 first elected in 1911 as Conservative member for Lunenburg, Nova Scotia.
- Duncan Alexander Stewart b. 1850 first elected in 1902 as Liberal member for Lisgar, Manitoba.
- Hugh Alexander Stewart b. 1871 first elected in 1921 as Conservative member for Leeds, Ontario.
- Jake Stewart b. 1978 first elected in 2021 as Conservative member for Miramichi—Grand Lake, New Brunswick.
- Jane Stewart b. 1955 first elected in 1993 as Liberal member for Brant, Ontario.
- John Alexander Stewart b. 1867 first elected in 1918 as Unionist member for Lanark, Ontario.
- John Benjamin Stewart b. 1924 first elected in 1962 as Liberal member for Antigonish—Guysborough, Nova Scotia.
- John Smith Stewart b. 1878 first elected in 1930 as Conservative member for Lethbridge, Alberta.
- Kennedy Stewart b. 1966 first elected in 2011 as New Democratic Party member for Burnaby—Douglas, British Columbia.
- Ralph Wesley Stewart b. 1929 first elected in 1968 as Liberal member for Cochrane, Ontario.
- Robert Stewart b. 1850 first elected in 1904 as Liberal member for City of Ottawa, Ontario.
- Robert Dugald Caldwell Stewart b. 1907 first elected in 1958 as Progressive Conservative member for Charlotte, New Brunswick.
- Ronald Alexander Stewart b. 1927 first elected in 1979 as Progressive Conservative member for Simcoe South, Ontario.
- Thomas Joseph Stewart b. 1848 first elected in 1908 as Conservative member for Hamilton West, Ontario.
- William Douglas Stewart b. 1938 first elected in 1968 as Liberal member for Okanagan—Kootenay, British Columbia.

== Sti–Stu ==
- Leonard T. Stick b. 1892 first elected in 1949 as Liberal member for Trinity—Conception, Newfoundland and Labrador.
- Darrel Stinson b. 1945 first elected in 1993 as Reform member for Okanagan—Shuswap, British Columbia.
- Frederick Coles Stinson b. 1922 first elected in 1957 as Progressive Conservative member for York Centre, Ontario.
- Thomas Hubert Stinson b. 1883 first elected in 1925 as Conservative member for Victoria, Ontario.
- Grote Stirling b. 1875 first elected in 1924 as Conservative member for Yale, British Columbia.
- David Stirton b. 1816 first elected in 1867 as Liberal member for Wellington South, Ontario.
- Bernard Munroe Stitt b. 1880 first elected in 1930 as Conservative member for Nelson, Manitoba.
- James Herbert Stitt b. 1891 first elected in 1930 as Conservative member for Selkirk, Manitoba.
- Alfred Augustus Stockton b. 1842 first elected in 1904 as Conservative member for City and County of St. John, New Brunswick.
- Peter Stoffer b. 1956 first elected in 1997 as New Democratic Party member for Sackville—Eastern Shore, Nova Scotia.
- George Henry Stokes b. 1876 first elected in 1940 as National Government member for Hastings South, Ontario.
- Peter Alan Stollery b. 1935 first elected in 1972 as Liberal member for Spadina, Ontario.
- Alfred Stork b. 1871 first elected in 1921 as Liberal member for Skeena, British Columbia.
- Brian Storseth b. 1978 first elected in 2006 as Conservative member for Westlock—St. Paul, Alberta.
- Chuck Strahl b. 1957 first elected in 1993 as Reform member for Fraser Valley East, British Columbia.
- Mark Strahl b. 1978 first elected in 2011 as Conservative member for Chilliwack—Fraser Canyon, British Columbia.
- Frederick William Strange b. 1844 first elected in 1878 as Liberal-Conservative member for York North, Ontario.
- Diane Stratas b. 1932 first elected in 1979 as Progressive Conservative member for Scarborough Centre, Ontario.
- James Robert Stratton b. 1858 first elected in 1908 as Liberal member for Peterborough West, Ontario.
- Matt Strauss first elected in 2025 as Conservative member for Kitchener South—Hespeler, Ontario.
- Thomas Clark Street b. 1814 first elected in 1867 as Conservative member for Welland, Ontario.
- John Everett Lyle Streight b. 1880 first elected in 1935 as Liberal member for York West, Ontario.
- Belinda Stronach b. 1966 first elected in 2004 as Conservative member for Newmarket—Aurora, Ontario.
- Gladys Grace Mae Strum b. 1906 first elected in 1945 as Cooperative Commonwealth Federation member for Qu'Appelle, Saskatchewan.
- Andrew Wesley Stuart b. 1902 first elected in 1945 as Liberal member for Charlotte, New Brunswick.
- John Stuart b. 1830 first elected in 1874 as Liberal member for Norfolk South, Ontario.
- Shannon Stubbs b. 1979 first elected in 2015 as Conservative member for Lakeland, Alberta.
- William Stubbs b. 1847 first elected in 1895 as Independent Conservative member for Cardwell, Ontario.
- Irvin William Studer b. 1900 first elected in 1949 as Liberal member for Maple Creek, Saskatchewan.
- David Stupich b. 1921 first elected in 1988 as New Democratic Party member for Nanaimo—Cowichan, British Columbia.

== Su ==
- Jenna Sudds b. 1979 first elected in 2021 as Liberal member for Kanata—Carleton, Ontario.
- Allen Sulatycky b. 1938 first elected in 1968 as Liberal member for Rocky Mountain, Alberta.
- Gordon Joseph Sullivan b. 1920 first elected in 1968 as Liberal member for Hamilton Mountain, Ontario.
- John Alexander Sullivan b. 1879 first elected in 1930 as Conservative member for St. Ann, Quebec.
- Mike Sullivan b. 1952 first elected in 2011 as New Democratic Party member for York South—Weston, Ontario.
- Thomas Suluk b. 1950 first elected in 1984 as Progressive Conservative member for Nunatsiaq, Northwest Territories.
- Donald Sutherland b. 1863 first elected in 1911 as Conservative member for Oxford South, Ontario.
- Donald Matheson Sutherland b. 1879 first elected in 1925 as Conservative member for Oxford North, Ontario.
- Hugh McKay Sutherland b. 1843 first elected in 1882 as Liberal member for Selkirk, Manitoba.
- James Sutherland b. 1849 first elected in 1880 as Liberal member for Oxford North, Ontario.
- Robert Franklin Sutherland b. 1859 first elected in 1900 as Liberal member for Essex North, Ontario.

== Sw ==
- James Beck Swanston b. 1878 first elected in 1930 as Conservative member for Maple Creek, Saskatchewan.
- David Sweet b. 1957 first elected in 2006 as Conservative member for Ancaster—Dundas—Flamborough—Westdale, Ontario.

== Sy ==
- George Sylvain b. 1819 first elected in 1867 as Conservative member for Rimouski, Quebec.
- Armand Sylvestre b. 1890 first elected in 1925 as Liberal member for Lake St. John, Quebec.
- Cyril Symes b. 1943 first elected in 1972 as New Democratic Party member for Sault Ste. Marie, Ontario.

== Sz ==
- Paul Szabo b. 1948 first elected in 1993 as Liberal member for Mississauga South, Ontario.
