= Scatcherd =

Scatcherd is a surname, and may refer to:

== People ==
- Alice Cliff Scatcherd (1842–1906), British suffragist
- Elisabeth Yvonne Scatcherd, birthname of French-British actress Yvonne Furneaux (born 1926)
- Felicia Rudolphina Scatcherd (1862–1927), English journalist and spiritualist
- John Scatcherd (1800–1858), Canadian farmer, merchant and political figure
- Robert Colin Scatcherd (1832–1879), Canadian lawyer and political figure
- Thomas Scatcherd (1823–1876), Canadian lawyer and political figure

== Fictional characters ==
- Sir Roger, Lady Scatcherd, Mary and Louis Scatcherd, in the novel Doctor Thorne by Anthony Trollope
- Miss Scatcherd, in the novel Jane Eyre by Charlotte Brontë
