= Middlesex North =

Middlesex North could refer to

- Middlesex North (federal electoral district)
- Middlesex North (provincial electoral district)
