= James Sinclair Smith =

Canadian politician

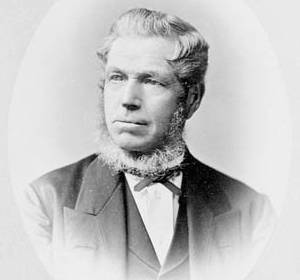

Ontario MPP
- In office 1867–1874
- Preceded by: Riding established
- Succeeded by: John McDougall
- Constituency: Middlesex North

Personal details
- Born: December 27, 1816 Caithness, Scotland
- Died: October 4, 1897 (aged 80) McGillivray Township, Ontario
- Party: Liberal
- Relations: Alexander Smith, son
- Occupation: Farmer

James Sinclair Smith (December 27, 1816 – October 4, 1897) was a farmer, livestock breeder and political figure in Ontario, Canada. He represented Middlesex North in the Legislative Assembly of Ontario as a Liberal member from 1867 to 1874.

He was born in Caithness, Scotland in 1816. He served as reeve of McGillivray Township in Middlesex County. He was defeated by John McDougall in the 1875 general election.

Smith was postmaster at Maple Lodge in Middlesex County.

His son Alexander served in the Canadian House of Commons. He died (supposedly) at McGillivray in 1897.

== Electoral history ==
1867 Ontario general election: Middlesex North
| Party | Candidate | Votes | % |
|---|---|---|---|
| Liberal | James Sinclair Smith | 1,084 | 43.69 |
| Conservative | John McDougall | 1,046 | 42.16 |
| Independent | Mr. McIntyre | 351 | 14.15 |
| Total valid votes | | 2,481 | 84.79 |
| Eligible voters | | 2,926 | |
| Liberal pickup new district. | | | |
Source: Elections Ontario

1871 Ontario general election: Middlesex North
| Party | Candidate | Votes | % | ±% |
|---|---|---|---|---|
| Liberal | James Sinclair Smith | 1,286 | 56.58 | +12.89 |
| Conservative | Mr. McIntosh | 987 | 43.42 | +1.26 |
| Turnout | | 2,273 | 69.34 | −15.45 |
| Eligible voters | | 3,278 | | |
| Liberal hold | | Swing | | +5.81 |
Source: Elections Ontario

1875 Ontario general election: Middlesex North
| Party | Candidate | Votes | % | ±% |
|---|---|---|---|---|
| Conservative | John McDougall | 1,565 | 54.89 | +11.47 |
| Liberal | James Sinclair Smith | 1,286 | 45.11 | −11.47 |
| Total valid votes | | 2,851 | 72.77 | +3.43 |
| Eligible voters | | 3,918 | | |
| Conservative gain from Liberal | | Swing | | +11.47 |
Source: Elections Ontario
