= John Waters (politician) =

Canadian politician (1829–1910)

Ontario MPP
- In office 1879–1894
- Preceded by: John McDougall
- Succeeded by: William Henry Taylor
- Constituency: Middlesex North

Personal details
- Born: July 4, 1829 Obrig, Caithness, Scotland
- Died: December 7, 1910 (aged 81) London, Ontario
- Party: Liberal

John Waters (July 4, 1829 – December 7, 1910) was a Canadian Liberal legislator who, from June 1879 to May 1894, represented the Ontario riding of Middlesex North in the Legislative Assembly of Ontario where, in 1893, he introduced a bill which would have given women the vote in provincial elections. He was born in Scotland in 1829.

From 1868 to 1875, prior to his service in the Legislative Assembly, Waters held the title of reeve, as the elected administrator for rural municipality of East Williams Township and, in 1875, served as warden for Middlesex County. He died at his London, Ontario home on December 7, 1910.

== Electoral history ==
1879 Ontario general election: Middlesex North
Party	Candidate	Votes	%	±%
Liberal	John Waters	1,917	53.22	+8.11
Conservative	John McDougall	1,685	46.78	−8.11
Total valid votes		3,602	72.87	+0.10
Eligible voters		4,943		
Liberal gain from Conservative		Swing		+8.11
Source: Elections Ontario
