= William Henry Taylor (politician) =

Canadian politician

Ontario MPP
- In office 1894–1904
- Preceded by: John Waters
- Succeeded by: Charles Constantine Hodgins
- Constituency: Middlesex North

Personal details
- Born: 1848 Cartwright Township, Durham County, Canada West
- Died: 1916 (aged 67–68) Middlesex County, Ontario
- Party: Liberal-Patrons of Industry, 1894-1898; Liberal, 1898-1904
- Spouse: Jane Wilson
- Occupation: Farmer

William Henry Taylor (1848 – 1916) was an Ontario farmer and political figure. He represented Middlesex North in the Legislative Assembly of Ontario from 1894 to 1904 as a Liberal-Patrons of Industry and then Liberal member.

He was born in Cartwright Township, Durham County, Canada West, the son of William Taylor. Taylor served as reeve for McGillivray Township and as warden for Middlesex County. He was also postmaster at Parkhill. He married Jane Wilson after the death of his first wife. Taylor was a racing enthusiast and died after being kicked by one of his mares.
