= Duncan MacArthur =

Duncan MacArthur may refer to:

- Duncan MacArthur (Manitoba politician) (1840–1907), member of the Legislative Assembly of Manitoba
- Duncan MacArthur (Ontario politician) (1911–1914), member of the Legislative Assembly of Ontario

== See also ==
- Duncan McArthur (1772–1839), military officer and politician from Ohio
- Duncan McArthur (Canadian politician) (1885 –1943), member of the Legislative Assembly of Ontario
