= Gordon Crooks Wilson =

Canadian politician

Member of Parliament for Wentworth
- In office 1911–1935
- Preceded by: William Oscar Sealey
- Succeeded by: Frank Lennard

Ontario MPP
- In office 1908–1911
- Preceded by: Robert Thompson
- Succeeded by: James McQueen
- Constituency: Wentworth North

Personal details
- Born: 25 February 1872 Dundas, Ontario
- Died: 4 May 1937 (aged 65) Dundas, Ontario
- Party: Conservative; Unionist
- Profession: Merchant

Gordon Crooks Wilson (25 February 1872 – 4 May 1937) was a Conservative and Unionist Party member of the House of Commons of Canada. He was born in Dundas, Ontario and became an agent and merchant.

He was the son of John Wilson, was educated in Dundas and entered business there as a hardware merchant. Wilson served as councillor for Dundas, Ontario at one time. He first sought a seat in the Legislative Assembly of Ontario in 1905 but was unsuccessful. He won a provincial seat at Wentworth North in 1908. He quit his provincial seat in 1911 to campaign for federal Parliament.

He was first elected to Parliament at the Wentworth riding in the 1911 general election, then re-elected in 1917, 1921, 1925, 1926 and 1930 federal election. From March 1918 until October 1921, Wilson served under the Unionist Party banner.
