= Valentine Ratz =

Canadian politician

The Honourable Valentine Ratz
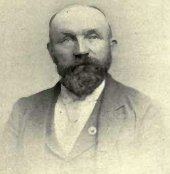

Canadian Senator from Ontario
- In office January 18, 1909 – March 1, 1924
- Appointed by: Wilfrid Laurier

Member of Parliament for Middlesex North
- In office 1896–1900
- Preceded by: William Henry Hutchins
- Succeeded by: John Sherritt
- In office 1904–1908
- Preceded by: John Sherritt
- Succeeded by: Alexander Wilson Smith

Personal details
- Born: November 12, 1848 St. Jacobs, County of Waterloo, Canada West
- Died: March 1, 1924 (aged 75) Guelph, Ontario, Canada
- Party: Liberal

Valentine Ratz (November 12, 1848 – March 1, 1924) was a Canadian lumber merchant and politician in the province of Ontario.

== Background ==
Born in St. Jacobs, County of Waterloo, Canada West, the son of Jacob Ratz, Ratz received his education at Pine Hill Public School. As a lumber merchant, he was President of the South River Lumber Company of Parry Sound District. In 1879 he entered the municipal council of the Township of Stephen and was Deputy Reeve and Reeve. He was also elected Warden of the County of Huron in 1886. In 1873, Ratz married Mary Yagers. He was first elected to the House of Commons of Canada for the electoral district of Middlesex North in the general election of 1896. A Liberal, he was defeated in the 1900 federal election and was re-elected in the 1904 federal election. He was summoned to the Senate of Canada for the senatorial division of Parkhill, Ontario on the advice of Prime Minister Wilfrid Laurier in 1909. He served until his death in Guelph in 1924.

== Electoral record ==
1896 Canadian federal election: Middlesex North
Party	Candidate	Votes
Liberal	Valentine Ratz	2,184
Conservative	William H. Hutchins	2,122

1900 Canadian federal election: Middlesex North
Party	Candidate	Votes
Conservative	John Sherritt	2,221
Liberal	Valentine Ratz	2,008

1904 Canadian federal election: Middlesex North
Party	Candidate	Votes
Liberal	Valentine Ratz	1,894
Liberal	Robert Boston	1,598
