= George Adam Elliott =

Canadian politician

Ontario MPP
- In office 1923–1926
- Preceded by: James C. Brown
- Succeeded by: Alexander Daniel McLean
- Constituency: Middlesex North

Member of Parliament for Middlesex North
- In office 1911–1917
- Preceded by: Alexander Wilson Smith
- Succeeded by: Riding abolished

Personal details
- Born: June 12, 1875 Parkhill, Ontario
- Died: November 29, 1944 (aged 69)
- Party: Conservative
- Spouse: Charlotte Poire (m. 1896)
- Occupation: Farmer

George Adam Elliott (June 12, 1875 – November 29, 1944) was an Ontario farmer and political figure. He represented Middlesex North in the House of Commons of Canada as a Conservative member from 1911 to 1917 and in the Legislative Assembly of Ontario from 1923 to 1926 in the provincial riding of Middlesex North.

He was born in Parkhill, Ontario, the son of Andrew Elliott. In 1896, he married Charlotte Poire. Elliot was unsuccessful in bids for reelection to the federal parliament in 1917 and 1921. He served as reeve for West Williams Township, also serving on the local school board.
