= James C. Brown (Ontario politician) =

Canadian politician

Ontario MPP
- In office 1919–1923
- Preceded by: John Grieve
- Succeeded by: George Adam Elliott
- Constituency: Middlesex North

Personal details
- Born: July 2, 1868 East Williams Township, Middlesex County, Ontario
- Died: April 17, 1937 (aged 68) West Williams, Ontario
- Party: United Farmers
- Spouse: Christina McKellar (m. 1891)
- Occupation: Farmer

James C. Brown (July 2, 1868 – April 17, 1937) was an Ontario farmer and political figure. He represented Middlesex North in the Legislative Assembly of Ontario from 1919 to 1923 as a United Farmers of Ontario member.

He was born in East Williams Township, Middlesex County, Ontario, the son of William Brown and Fanny McMurry. In 1891, he married Christina McKellar. He was also president and director for the local telephone company. Brown lived near Parkhill. He died in 1937.
