= Timothy Coughlin (politician) =

Canadian politician

Timothy Coughlin (January 8, 1834 – August 12, 1912) was a farmer and political figure in Ontario. He represented Middlesex North from 1878 to 1891 in the House of Commons of Canada as a Liberal-Conservative member.

He was born in Yarmouth Township, Upper Canada, the son of Daniel Coughlin and Mary Regan, Irish immigrants. Coughlin moved with his family to Stephen Township in 1846. He served as treasurer and then reeve for Stephen Township. In 1870, he married Mary Ann Glavin.

His son John Joseph later became a lawyer and judge.

1878 Canadian federal election: Middlesex North
Party	Candidate	Votes
Liberal–Conservative	Timothy Coughlin	1,629
Liberal	Robert Colin Scatcherd	1,621

1882 Canadian federal election: Middlesex North
Party	Candidate	Votes
Liberal–Conservative	Timothy Coughlin	1,741
Unknown	L. E. Shipley	1,632

1887 Canadian federal election: Middlesex North
Party	Candidate	Votes
Liberal–Conservative	T. Coughlin	2,133
Unknown	L. E. Shipley	1,864

1891 Canadian federal election: Middlesex North
Party	Candidate	Votes
Conservative	W. H. Hutchins	1,965
Liberal	W. H. Taylor	1,959
