= William Atcheson Stewart =

Canadian politician

Bill Stewart

Ontario MPP
- In office 1957–1975
- Preceded by: Thomas L. Patrick
- Succeeded by: Riding abolished
- Constituency: Middlesex North

Personal details
- Born: February 26, 1915 London, Ontario
- Died: December 8, 1990 (aged 75) London, Ontario
- Party: Progressive Conservative
- Spouse: Edythe Jones
- Children: 4
- Occupation: Farmer
- Portfolio: Minister without portfolio, 1960–1961

William Atcheson Stewart (February 26, 1915 – December 8, 1990) was a politician in Ontario, Canada. He was a Progressive Conservative member of the Legislative Assembly of Ontario from 1957 to 1975 who represented the southwestern Ontario riding of Middlesex North. He served as a cabinet minister in the governments of Leslie Frost, John Robarts, and Bill Davis.

== Background ==
Stewart was a cattle farmer in Denfield, Ontario. He married Edythe Jones and together they raised four daughters.

== Politics ==
In 1957, Stewart was elected in a by-election in the riding of Middlesex North to replace Thomas L. Patrick who had died that year. He defeated Liberal candidate A.E. Smith by 3,134 votes. He was re-elected in 1959, 1963, 1967, and 1971. In 1960, Leslie Frost appointed him to cabinet as a Minister Without Portfolio. In 1961 he was appointed by new Premier, John Robarts as Minister of Agriculture. He retained the cabinet position for 15 years until his retirement in 1975.

=== Cabinet positions ===
Davis ministry, Province of Ontario (1971–1985)
Cabinet post (1)
Predecessor	Office	Successor
Bill Goodfellow	Minister of Agriculture and Food (Note: From 1961 to 1966, portfolio was known as Ministry of Agriculture.); 1961–1975	Bill Newman

== Later life ==
In 1983, he was appointed the fourth chancellor of the University of Guelph. In 1976, he was awarded an honorary LL.D. from the University of Guelph. He was elected to the Canadian Agricultural Hall of Fame in 1988.

Academic offices
Preceded by Pauline McGibbon	Chancellor of the University of Guelph; 1983–1989	Succeeded by Edmund Bovey
