= Fred Van Wyck Laughton =

Canadian politician from Ontario

Member of the Ontario Provincial Parliament for Middlesex North
- In office September 30, 1929 – April 3, 1934
- Preceded by: Alexander Daniel McLean
- Succeeded by: John Willard Freeborn

Personal details
- Party: Conservative

Fred Van Wyck Laughton was a Canadian politician from the Conservative Party of Ontario. He represented Middlesex North in the Legislative Assembly of Ontario from 1929 to 1934.

== See also ==
- 18th Parliament of Ontario
