= Charles Constantine Hodgins =

Canadian politician

Charles C. Hodgins

Ontario MPP
- In office 1905–1908
- Preceded by: William Henry Taylor
- Succeeded by: Duncan Campbell Ross
- Constituency: Middlesex North

Personal details
- Born: September 16, 1857 Biddulph township
- Died: March 11, 1942 (aged 84) Woodstock, Ontario
- Party: Conservative
- Spouse: Margaret Matilda Hodgins (m. 1884)
- Children: 5
- Occupation: Hospital administrator

Charles Constantine Hodgins (September 16, 1857 – March 11, 1942) was a farmer and politician in Ontario, Canada. He represented Middlesex North in the Legislative Assembly of Ontario from 1905 to 1908 as a Conservative member.

== Biography ==
The son of John Hodgins and Amelia Roberts, he was born in Biddulph township. After completing his education, Hodgins taught school for eight years, after which he settled on a farm. He served as reeve for the township from 1887 to 1897. His grandfather Colonel James Hodgins, a native of County Tipperary, Ireland, had served as the first reeve of Biddulph.

In 1884, he married Matilda Hodgins. In 1908 he was appointed bursar of Ontario Hospital in Woodstock and then transferred to a hospital in Kingston in 1914. He retired in 1927. He died in 1942 in Woodstock.
