= Elizabeth Smith Shortt =

Canadian physician

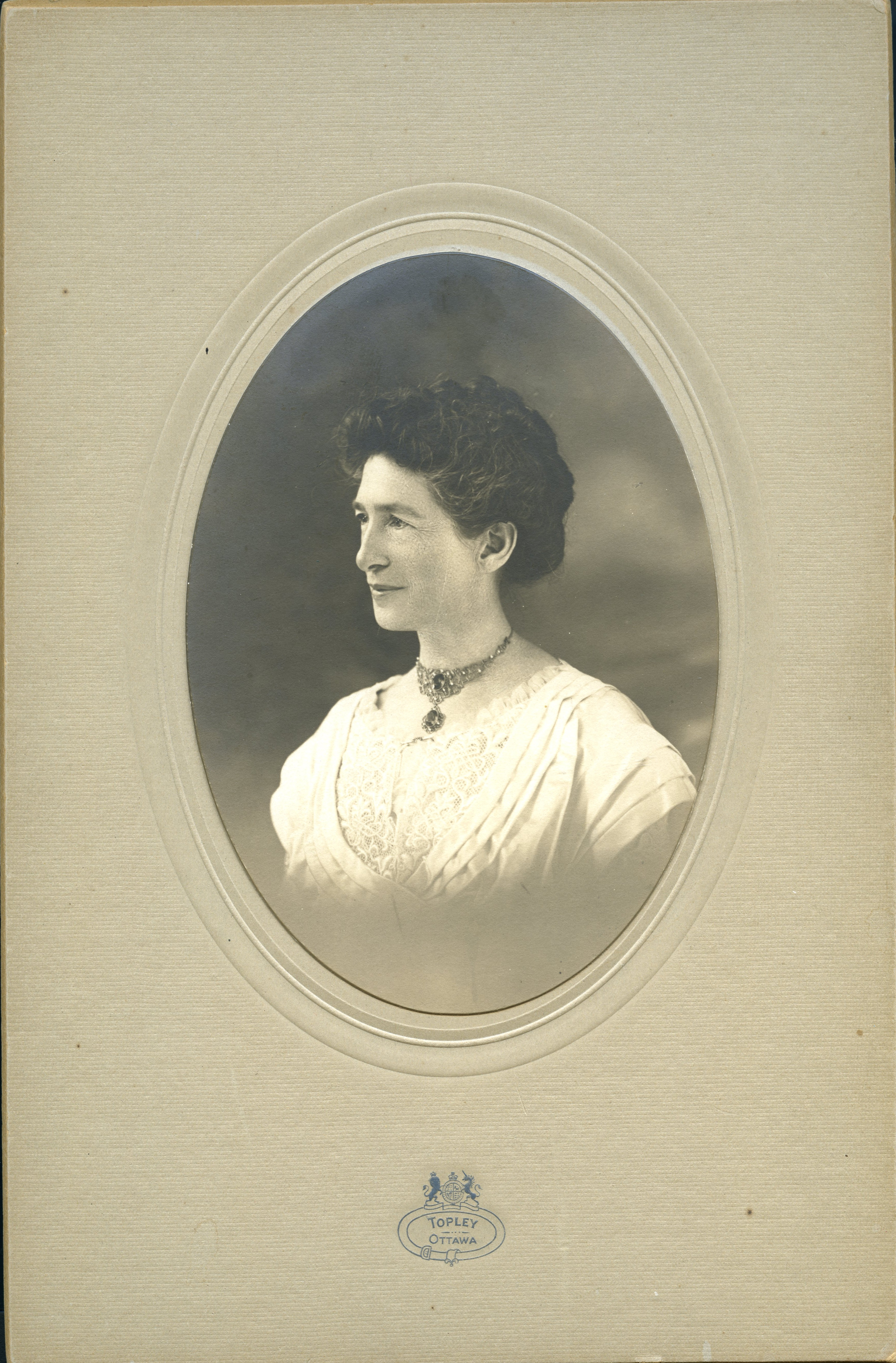
- Elizabeth Smith Shortt, ca. 1910
- Born: Elizabeth Smith; 18 January 1859; Vinemount, Ontario, Canada
- Died: 14 January 1949 (aged 89); Ottawa, Ontario, Canada
- Occupation: Physician
- Known for: One of first three women to obtain a medical degree in Canada
- Spouse: Adam Shortt (m. 1886; died 1931)
- Relatives: E.D. Smith (brother)

Elizabeth Smith Shortt (18 January 1859 – 14 January 1949) was one of the first three women to earn a medical degree in Canada. She was one of the women medical students expelled from Queen's University, Ontario following a hostile backlash from male staff and students at the presence of women in the medical school. Shortt went on to complete her studies at a newly established women's college and practised medicine in Hamilton, Ontario. She was a long-serving and active member of the National Council of Women of Canada and spearheaded a number of public health and women's welfare initiatives.

== Early life and education ==
Shortt was born on 18 January 1859 in the community of Winona, which is now located in the city of Hamilton, Ontario. Her parents were Sylvester Smith (died in 1885) and Damaris Isabella Smith (McGee) (1831–1913). One of six children, Elizabeth and her siblings were raised on farmland granted to the Smith family who were United Empire Loyalists. Her brother Ernest D’Israeli Smith was a politician and founder of E.D. Smith Jam. Shortt received her education from a governess as well as attending Winona School and Hamilton Collegiate Institute.

She also attended Ottawa Normal School in January 1880. Even though she enjoyed her time at the school, she recalls rarely being challenged. While attending she frequently received the weekly Honourable Mentions; she also attended many parliamentary sessions and frequented the House of Commons.

=== Queen's University ===
In February 1880 Shortt read in the newspaper about prospective separate classes for women in medicine; in April of the same year, she started her training at Queen's University in Kingston, Ontario. She was one of the first three women to attend Queen's, accompanied by who she refers to in her personal writings as Mrs. Mae and Miss Betty. Shortt was required to be up every morning at 6:00 am and had classes until 8:00 pm; she then would continue studying until 11:00 pm. One of the first things she recalls when beginning her studies is that many found it odd for someone of her young age to be in medical school. She took physiology, histology, therapeutics, chemistry, and botany, and spent her free time reading about the physiology of hearing and sight.

The medical course Shortt and others enrolled in was, in every regard, identical to the course for men: the same degree, material and qualifications. Though men and women learned the material separately, the degree examination was taken collectively. Shortt recalls in 1882 a younger male lecturer speaking against having women students in the college, and although she did not take it personally she did state that the worst thing about it was that it would incite men in the college to be obnoxious. She also recounts unwillingly taking her obstetrics class in a connecting room beside the men's class, learning through an open door; she was also required to use a separate dissecting room from the men. These incidents were part of a larger backlash in the university against the presence of women in the medical school, and in 1883 the university expelled the women students due to the complaints of the men, who had threatened to leave if the women were permitted to continue studying.

Sympathetic staff established a women's college, named the Kingston Women's Medical College, and Shortt and her women classmates continued their studies there.

== Career ==
After finishing medical school in 1884, Shortt opened her own medical practice in Hamilton, Ontario. Early in her professional career, Shortt had professional mentorship from Emily Stowe and her cousin J. W. Smith, also consulting on their cases occasionally. Shortt often felt inexperienced as a physician and lacked the resources to hire a nurse, so she operated on patients alone. In order to protect her reputation as a woman practising medicine, Shortt refused to treat male patients.

In 1887 Shortt returned to Kingston and lectured at the Women's Medical College at Queen's University on medical jurisprudence and sanitary science. In 1908 she moved to Ottawa and worked in a voluntary capacity for women's and mother's organisations, as well as campaigning on public health matters.

=== National Council of Women ===
Shortt was a highly active member of the National Council of Women of Canada, as well as the local and provincial councils. Throughout her time of being a member of these councils she worked, wrote and spoke about issues dealing with housing, inspection of markets, fly control, PXS pasteurization of milk, care of mentally deficient, child welfare, and mother's pension.

In 1911, she became the first Convener of the Public Health and Mental Hygiene Committee of the National Council of Women, which worked to combat mental health disorders. She was also Convener of the Committee on Immigration of the National Council of Women, which was active in organizing a hostel for female immigrants in Ottawa.

In 1913, after a year's study, Shortt wrote a report on behalf of the National Council of Women about the necessity of establishing mothers' allowances. This report petitioned for welfare to be given to mothers in need, ranging from widows to mothers whose husbands were unable to provide, provided there were at least two or more children in the family that were 16 years old or younger, and requiring that those between 14 and 16 years old were in school (with the exception of qualifying children above 16 if they are also incapacitated). This petition went on to become an official act passed through legislation and became known as the Mothers' Allowance Act.

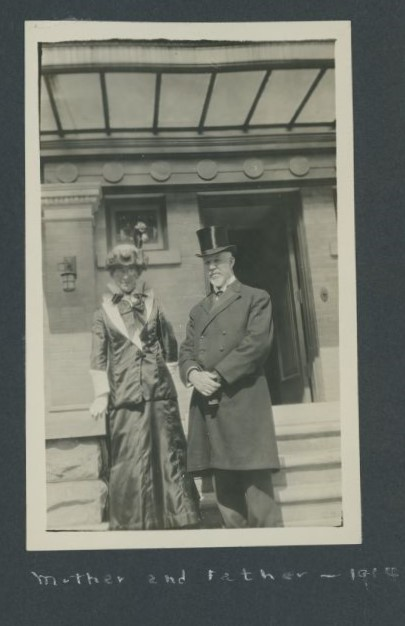
Elizabeth Smith Shortt and husband Adam Shortt, 1914

Shortt also drew attention to issues surrounding the stigma of tuberculosis in the 1900s, calling it a social issue. She mentioned the topics of alcoholism, the meat and dairy supply, hereditary causes, immigration, industrial conditions and the necessity of good conditions for mothers in relation to the epidemic and how it was being handled by the public and governments. Shortt suggested that movements needed to be made in these areas in order to prevent the spread of tuberculosis and help those who already had it, rather than stigmatizing the disease. Her pamphlet The Social Aspects of Tuberculosis aided in the eventual founding of the Canadian Tuberculosis Society.

Shortt wrote a memorandum outlining the outbreaks of milk borne typhoid and the regulations that were put in place, in Ottawa and elsewhere, as a result. This memorandum explains the process of pasteurizing milk to kill unhealthy bacteria to non-certified milk and reports the process of inspectors sampling milk to be tested in a laboratory.

In 1914, she became the vice president of the Provincial Council of Women. In 1919, Shortt was given Life Patronship in the National Council of Women in recognition of the admiration and esteem of the Ottawa Local Council of Women. She had been the President of this council since 1911.

=== Work with other community organisations ===
Shortt was the president of the Kingston YWCA, Kingston Musical Club, and the Queen's University Alumnae Association. In her position with the Alumnae Association, she organised a fundraising campaign for a residential hall for women to be opened on the Queen's campus. The campaign opened in 1910, and by 1919 had raised $42,000.

Shortt was also active in the Women's Canadian Club.

=== Diaries ===
Two collections of Shortt's diaries have been published: her diaries for the years 1872–1884, which include her experiences at medical school, were published under the title A Woman with a Purpose (University of Toronto Press, 1980); her diaries while travelling in Europe with her husband in 1911 were published as Travels and Identities: Elizabeth and Adam Shortt in Europe, 1911 (Wilfrid Laurier University Press, 2017).

== Personal life ==
In November 1882 Shortt met Adam Shortt, a fellow Queen's student. The couple were married on December 23, 1886; they had two daughters and one son together.

== Death ==
Shortt died of illness at Perley House, Ottawa, on 14 January 1949, aged 89. Her funeral was highly attended, including appearances from influential members of society.
