= Franklin Metcalfe Carpenter =

Canadian politician

Franklin Metcalfe Carpenter (July 23, 1847 – September 25, 1907) was a farmer and political figure in Ontario, Canada. He represented Wentworth South in the House of Commons of Canada from 1887 to 1896 as a Conservative member.

He was born in Saltfleet Township, Canada West. He served on the council for Saltfleet Township from 1872 to 1874 and was reeve from 1874 to 1883; he also served as warden for Wentworth County. Carpenter was an unsuccessful candidate in the 1878 federal election, losing to Joseph Rymal. He was elected to the Legislative Assembly of Ontario in 1879 but the election was declared void later that year. In 1880, he married Catherine H. Gardiner. Carpenter was also a major in the militia.

== Electoral record ==
1878 Canadian federal election: Wentworth South
Party	Candidate	Votes	%	±%
Liberal	Joseph Rymal	1,169		
Unknown	Franklin Metcalfe Carpenter	1,095		

1887 Canadian federal election: Wentworth South
Party	Candidate	Votes	%	±%
Conservative	F.M. Carpenter	1,839		
Liberal	Jas. Russell	1,663		

1891 Canadian federal election: Wentworth South
Party	Candidate	Votes	%	±%
Conservative	F.M. Carpenter	1,773		
Liberal	Jas. T. Middleton	1,772		
