= Frank Lennard =

Canadian conservative politician (1892 - 1973)

Frank Exton Lennard Jr.
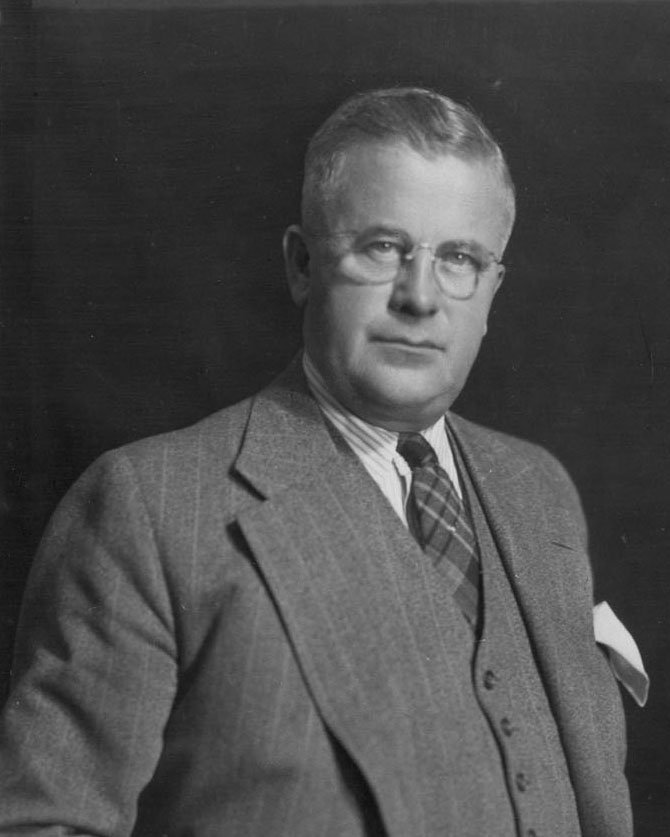
- Lennard c. 1942-1948

Canadian Ambassador to the United Nations
- In office November 1957 – January 1958
- Preceded by: Robert Alexander MacKay
- Succeeded by: Charles Ritchie

Member of Parliament for Wentworth
- In office November 1957 – March 1940
- Preceded by: Gordon Crooks Wilson
- Succeeded by: Ellis Hopkins Corman

Member of Parliament for Wentworth
- In office June 1945 – April 1962
- Preceded by: Ellis Hopkins Corman
- Succeeded by: Joseph Reed Sams

Personal details
- Born: 24 April 1892 Dundas, Ontario, Canada
- Died: 25 February 1973 (aged 80) Dundas, Ontario, Canada
- Party: Conservative; Progressive Conservative
- Spouse: Gladys Emily McLachlan (m. 1918)

Frank Exton Lennard (24 April 1892 – 25 February 1973) was a Conservative then a Progressive Conservative party member of the House of Commons of Canada. He was born in Dundas, Ontario and became a merchant and textile dyer by career.

== Early life ==
Lennard was born in Dundas to local businessman Frank Exton Lennard Sr. (1864 - 1936) and his wife, Phoebe Binkley (1862 - 1938). Lennard Sr. immigrated to Canada from Leicester, England in 1872. After time in Toronto and Philadelphia, the Lennard family settled in Dundas in 1878. There, the family established S. Lennard & Sons, a knitting mill which operated at the corner of King Street West and John Street in downtown Dundas until it was closed on December 31, 1970. Lennard's mother was a member of the Binkley Family, a group of early United Empire Loyalist settlers in what would eventually become the Ainslie Wood neighbourhood of Hamilton. The family were committed Anglicans, worshiping at St. Paul's Anglican Church in Hamilton's Westdale neighbourhood. Lennard was the only one of the couple's children to survive into adulthood; two brothers died in infancy.

Lennard attended Dundas Public School and, later, the prestigious private Highfield School for Boys (today's Hillfield Strathallan College). After graduation, Lennard joined the family business and became head of the mill's dyeing department. During World War I, Lennard served with the 77th Dundas Regiment as a Lieutenant. Upon his return, Lennard married Gladys McLachlan, the daughter of Reverend Thomas McLachlan, a Presbyterian and, later, United Church minister in Mount Hope. The couple had four children.

Following the death of his parents, Lennard inherited the family's estate, Foxbar House, where he would live for the rest of his life.

== Political career ==
Lennard served from 1930 to 1935 on the Dundas town council.

After Gordon Wilson, Conservative M.P. for the riding of Wentworth since 1911, decided to retire, Lennard was nominated as the Conservative candidate just prior to the 1935 general election. Lennard served one term before losing to Ellis Corman of the Liberals in the 1940 election.

After his defeat, Lennard was named head of the Dundas Red Cross and remained active in the Ontario Rugby Football Union (a forerunner to today's Canadian Football League).

Lennard returned to the House of Commons after defeating Corman in the 1945 election. He would go on to win five consecutive elections. In 1962, Lennard left federal politics after serving in the 24th Parliament.

After the Progressive Conservatives formed a minority government in 1957, Lennard was named by Prime Minister John Diefenbaker as a Canadian delegate to the United Nations General Assembly. Lennard told reporters that arrangement was preferable to a cabinet appointment as he sought to "win friends and influence people for Canada." He held this position for three months before the 1958 federal election.

== Later life and death ==
After his retirement, Lennard remained active in local sports and charitable organizations, including the Dundas Lions Club and the local Masonic lodge. Lennard died in Dundas in 1973 and was buried at Grove Cemetery. His wife died in 1986.
