= John Willard Freeborn =

Canadian politician (1885–1953)

Ontario MPP
- In office 1934–1943
- Preceded by: Fred Van Wyck Laughton
- Succeeded by: Thomas L. Patrick
- Constituency: Middlesex North
- In office 1919–1926
- Preceded by: John McFarlan
- Succeeded by: Riding abolished
- Constituency: Middlesex East

Personal details
- Born: May 24, 1885 Denfield, Middlesex County
- Died: December 16, 1953 (aged 68)
- Party: United Farmers, 1919-1926; Liberal, 1934-1943
- Spouse: J. Irene Carmichael (m. 1913)
- Occupation: Farmer

John Willard Freeborn (May 24, 1885 – December 16, 1953) was a farmer and politician in Ontario, Canada. He represented Middlesex East from 1919 to 1926 as a United Farmers member and Middlesex North from 1934 to 1943 as a Liberal member in the Legislative Assembly of Ontario.

The son of Thomas Freeborn and Margaret Crawdon, he was born in Denfield, Middlesex County and was educated there. In 1913, he married J. Irene Carmichael.

Freeborn was first elected to the Ontario assembly in 1919, serving two terms as a United Farmers member. He ran unsuccessfully for the Middlesex East seat in the Canadian House of Commons as a Progressive Party candidate in 1926, losing to Adam King Hodgins. He was elected as a Liberal in 1934 and reelected in 1937, before being defeated in the 1943 Ontario general election.
