= John Grieve (politician) =

Canadian farmer, manufacturer and political figure in Ontario

Ontario MPP
- In office 1914–1919
- Preceded by: Duncan MacArthur
- Succeeded by: James C. Brown
- Constituency: Middlesex North

Personal details
- Born: August 15, 1852 Folkestone, Kent, England
- Died: November 17, 1920 (aged 68) Simcoe, Ontario
- Party: Liberal
- Spouse: Caroline I. Wilson (m. 1875)
- Occupation: Lumber merchant

John Grieve (April 15, 1852 – November 17, 1920) was an English-born farmer, manufacturer and political figure in Ontario. He represented Middlesex North in the Legislative Assembly of Ontario from 1914 to 1919 as a Liberal member.

He was born in Folkestone, the son of Thomas Grieve and Elizabeth Main, both of Scottish descent, and came to British North America in 1862. In 1875, he married Caroline I. Wilson. Grieve was president of the Parkhill Lumber and Manufacturing Company. He ran unsuccessfully for a seat in the Ontario assembly in 1911. He died in 1920.
