= John McDougall (Ontario politician) =

Canadian politician

Ontario MPP
- In office 1875–1879
- Preceded by: James Sinclair Smith
- Succeeded by: John Waters
- Constituency: Middlesex North

Personal details
- Party: Conservative

John McDougall was an Ontario political figure. He represented Middlesex North in the Legislative Assembly of Ontario as a Conservative member from 1875 to 1879.

He lived in Komoka and served as reeve for Lobo Township.

== Electoral history ==
1875 Ontario general election: Middlesex North
Party	Candidate	Votes	%	±%
Conservative	John McDougall	1,565	54.89	+11.47
Liberal	James Sinclair Smith	1,286	45.11	−11.47
Total valid votes		2,851	72.77	+3.43
Eligible voters		3,918		
Conservative gain from Liberal		Swing		+11.47
Source: Elections Ontario

1879 Ontario general election: Middlesex North
Party	Candidate	Votes	%	±%
Liberal	John Waters	1,917	53.22	+8.11
Conservative	John McDougall	1,685	46.78	−8.11
Total valid votes		3,602	72.87	+0.10
Eligible voters		4,943		
Liberal gain from Conservative		Swing		+8.11
Source: Elections Ontario
