= Middlesex North (provincial electoral district) =

Former provincial electoral district in Ontario, Canada

Ontario electoral district

Defunct provincial electoral district
- Legislature: Legislative Assembly of Ontario
- District created: 1867
- District abolished: 1974
- First contested: 1867
- Last contested: 1971

Middlesex North was an electoral riding in Ontario, Canada. It was created in 1867 at the time of confederation and was abolished in 1973 before the 1975 election.

== Members of Provincial Parliament ==
Middlesex North
Assembly	Years	Member	Party
1st	1867–1871	James Sinclair Smith	Liberal
2nd	1871–1875	James Sinclair Smith	Liberal
3rd	1875–1879	John McDougall	Conservative
4th	1879–1883	John Waters	Liberal
5th	1883–1886	John Waters	Liberal
6th	1886–1890	John Waters	Liberal
7th	1890–1894	John Waters	Liberal
8th	1894–1898	William Henry Taylor	Liberal-Patron
9th	1898–1902	William Henry Taylor	Liberal
10th	1902–1904	William Henry Taylor	Liberal
11th	1905–1908	Charles Constantine Hodgins	Conservative
12th	1908–1909	Duncan Campbell Ross	Liberal
12th	1909–1911	James William Doyle	Conservative
13th	1911–1914	Duncan MacArthur	Conservative
14th	1914–1919	John Grieve	Liberal
15th	1919–1923	James C. Brown	United Farmers
16th	1923–1926	George Adam Elliott	Conservative
17th	1926–1929	Alexander Daniel McLean	Progressive
18th	1929–1934	Fred Van Wyck Laughton	Conservative
19th	1934–1937	John Willard Freeborn	Liberal
20th	1937–1943	John Willard Freeborn	Liberal
21st	1943–1945	Thomas Patrick	Progressive Conservative
22nd	1945–1948	Thomas Patrick	Progressive Conservative
23rd	1948–1951	Thomas Patrick	Progressive Conservative
24th	1951–1955	Thomas Patrick	Progressive Conservative
25th	1955–1957	Thomas Patrick	Progressive Conservative
25th	1957–1959	William Atcheson Stewart	Progressive Conservative
26th	1959–1963	William Atcheson Stewart	Progressive Conservative
27th	1963–1967	William Atcheson Stewart	Progressive Conservative
28th	1967–1971	William Atcheson Stewart	Progressive Conservative
29th	1971–1975	William Atcheson Stewart	Progressive Conservative
Sourced from the Ontario Legislative Assembly
Merged into Middlesex before 1975 election

== Election results ==
1971 Ontario general election
Party	Candidate	Votes	%	±%
Progressive Conservative	William Atcheson Stewart	8,633	52.49	–0.30
New Democratic	Pat Chefurka	4,478	27.23	+10.51
Liberal	Adrian Ansems	3,337	20.29	–10.21
Total valid votes		16,448	99.62	
Total rejected ballots		63	0.38	–0.13
Turnout		16,511	78.65	+11.63
Eligible voters		20,994		
Progressive Conservative hold		Swing		–5.40
Source: Elections Ontario

1967 Ontario general election
Party	Candidate	Votes	%	±%
Progressive Conservative	William Atcheson Stewart	5,744	52.78	–19.00
Liberal	Denzil Paterson	3,319	30.50	+7.52
New Democratic	Peter A. Weber	1,819	16.72	+11.48
Total valid votes		10,882	99.49	
Total rejected ballots		56	0.51	–0.04
Turnout		10,938	67.01	–1.57
Eligible voters		16,322		
Progressive Conservative hold		Swing		–13.26
Source: Elections Ontario

1963 Ontario general election
Party	Candidate	Votes	%	±%
Progressive Conservative	William Atcheson Stewart	9,960	71.79	+9.45
Liberal	Ronald C. Caldwell	3,188	22.98	–11.27
New Democratic	Harold J. Johnson	726	5.23	+1.82
Total valid votes		13,874	99.45	
Total rejected ballots		77	0.55	–0.13
Turnout		13,951	68.58	+2.59
Eligible voters		20,342		
Progressive Conservative hold		Swing		+10.36
Source: Elections Ontario

1959 Ontario general election
Party	Candidate	Votes	%	±%
Progressive Conservative	William Atcheson Stewart	6,452	62.34	–5.11
Liberal	John Paul	3,545	34.25	+1.70
Co-operative Commonwealth	Steve Molnar	353	3.41	–
Total valid votes		10,350	99.32	
Total rejected ballots		71	0.68	–0.18
Turnout		10,421	65.99	+5.20
Eligible voters		15,792		
Progressive Conservative hold		Swing		–3.40
Source: Elections Ontario

Ontario provincial by-election, September 5, 1957 Death of Thomas Patrick
Party	Candidate	Votes	%	±%
Progressive Conservative	William Atcheson Stewart	6,023	67.45	+16.07
Liberal	A.E. Smith	2,907	32.55	–13.13
Total valid votes		8,930	99.13	
Total rejected ballots		78	0.87	–0.16
Turnout		9,008	60.79	–13.57
Eligible voters		14,818		
Progressive Conservative hold		Swing		+14.60
Source: Elections Ontario

1955 Ontario general election
Party	Candidate	Votes	%	±%
Progressive Conservative	Thomas Patrick	5,077	51.38	+2.09
Liberal	Lloyd C. Hall	4,514	45.68	+13.46
Co-operative Commonwealth	Jack D. Jolliffe	291	2.94	–15.55
Total valid votes		9,882	98.98	
Total rejected ballots		102	1.02	–0.09
Turnout		9,984	74.36	+16.73
Eligible voters		13,426		
Progressive Conservative hold		Swing		–5.69
Source: Elections Ontario

1951 Ontario general election
Party	Candidate	Votes	%	±%
Progressive Conservative	Thomas Patrick	8,607	49.29	+5.94
Liberal	W. R. Bloomfield	5,626	32.22	–2.89
Co-operative Commonwealth	George Specht	3,229	18.49	–3.05
Total valid votes		17,462	98.89	
Total rejected ballots		196	1.11	+0.36
Turnout		17,658	57.63	–5.99
Eligible voters		30,641		
Progressive Conservative hold		Swing		+4.41
Source: Elections Ontario

1948 Ontario general election
Party	Candidate	Votes	%	±%
Progressive Conservative	Thomas Patrick	6,601	43.35	–2.50
Liberal	Charles J. Ross	5,346	35.11	+0.61
Co-operative Commonwealth	Miller Stewart	3,281	21.55	+1.88
Total valid votes		15,228	99.25	
Total rejected ballots		115	0.75	+0.01
Turnout		15,343	63.62	–7.44
Eligible voters		24,118		
Progressive Conservative hold		Swing		–1.56
Source: Elections Ontario

1945 Ontario general election
Party	Candidate	Votes	%	±%
Progressive Conservative	Thomas Patrick	7,123	45.85	+6.84
Liberal	Courtney R. Carmichael	5,359	34.49	+2.00
Co-operative Commonwealth	Harold Westman	3,055	19.66	–8.85
Total valid votes		15,537	99.26	
Total rejected ballots		116	0.74	+0.15
Turnout		15,653	71.05	+18.44
Eligible voters		22,030		
Progressive Conservative hold		Swing		+2.42
Source: Elections Ontario

1943 Ontario general election
Party	Candidate	Votes	%	±%
Progressive Conservative	Thomas Patrick	4,670	39.00	–1.10
Liberal	John Willard Freeborn	3,890	32.49	–27.41
Co-operative Commonwealth	Harold Westman	3,414	28.51	–
Total valid votes		11,974	99.41	
Total rejected ballots		71	0.59	–0.06
Turnout		12,045	52.61	–20.68
Eligible voters		22,895		
Progressive Conservative gain from Liberal		Swing		+13.15
Source: Elections Ontario

1937 Ontario general election
Party	Candidate	Votes	%	±%
Liberal	John Willard Freeborn	8,476	59.90	+5.15
Conservative	Fred Van Wyck Laughton	5,675	40.10	–5.15
Total valid votes		14,151	99.35	
Total rejected ballots		93	0.65	–0.34
Turnout		14,244	73.29	+0.57
Eligible voters		19,435		
Liberal hold		Swing		+5.15
Source: Elections Ontario

1934 Ontario general election
Party	Candidate	Votes	%	±%
Liberal	John Willard Freeborn	7,753	54.75	+5.55
Conservative	Fred Van Wyck Laughton	6,408	45.25	–5.55
Total valid votes		14,161	99.01	
Total rejected ballots		142	0.99	+0.38
Turnout		14,303	72.72	+2.32
Eligible voters		19,668		
Liberal gain from Conservative		Swing		+5.55
Source: Elections Ontario

1929 Ontario general election
Party	Candidate	Votes	%	±%
Conservative	Fred Van Wyck Laughton	5,288	50.80	+6.85
Liberal	Wilbert H. McLeish	5,121	49.20	–
Total valid votes		10,409	99.39	
Total rejected ballots		64	0.61	+0.21
Turnout		10,473	70.40	–2.66
Eligible voters		14,876		
Conservative gain from Independent Progressive		Swing		+3.42
Source: Elections Ontario

1926 Ontario general election
Party	Candidate	Votes	%	±%
Independent Progressive	Alexander Daniel McLean	5,861	56.04	–
Conservative	George Adam Elliott	4,597	43.96	–8.56
Total valid votes		10,458	99.60	
Total rejected ballots		42	0.40	–0.18
Turnout		10,500	73.06	+5.96
Eligible voters		14,372		
Independent Progressive gain from Conservative		Swing		–
Source: Elections Ontario

1923 Ontario general election
Party	Candidate	Votes	%	±%
Conservative	George Adam Elliott	3,319	52.52	+24.25
United Farmers	Harold Currie	3,001	47.48	–2.97
Total valid votes		6,320	99.42	
Total rejected ballots		37	0.58	–1.48
Turnout		6,357	67.10	–13.88
Eligible voters		9,474		
Conservative gain from United Farmers		Swing		+13.61
Source: Elections Ontario

1919 Ontario general election
Party	Candidate	Votes	%	±%
United Farmers	James C. Brown	3,857	50.45	–
Conservative	George Adam Elliott	2,161	28.27	–20.18
Liberal	John Grieve	1,627	21.28	–30.27
Total valid votes		7,645	97.94	
Total rejected ballots		161	2.06	+1.75
Turnout		7,806	80.98	–9.37
Eligible voters		9,639		
United Farmers gain from Liberal		Swing		–
Source: Elections Ontario

1914 Ontario general election
Party	Candidate	Votes	%	±%
Liberal	John Grieve	1,989	51.56	+2.00
Conservative	George Lewis	1,869	48.44	–2.00
Total valid votes		3,858	99.69	
Total rejected ballots		12	0.31	–0.07
Turnout		3,870	90.36	+14.96
Eligible voters		4,283		
Liberal gain from Conservative		Swing		+2.00
Source: Elections Ontario

1911 Ontario general election
Party	Candidate	Votes	%	±%
Conservative	Duncan MacArthur	1,991	50.44	–1.00
Liberal	John Grieve	1,956	49.56	+1.00
Total valid votes		3,947	99.62	
Total rejected ballots		15	0.38	+0.38
Turnout		3,962	75.39	–
Eligible voters		5,255		
Conservative hold		Swing		–1.00
Source: Elections Ontario

Ontario provincial by-election, December 6, 1909 Resignation of Duncan Campbell Ross to enter federal politics
Party	Candidate	Votes	%	±%
Conservative	James William Doyle	2,143	51.44	+2.73
Liberal	William John Mitchell	2,023	48.56	–2.73
Total valid votes		4,166	100.00	
Total rejected ballots		–		
Turnout		4,166	–	–
Eligible voters				
Conservative gain from Liberal		Swing		+2.73
Source: Elections Ontario

1908 Ontario general election
Party	Candidate	Votes	%	±%
Liberal	Duncan Campbell Ross	2,172	51.29	+1.97
Conservative	Charles Constantine Hodgins	2,063	48.71	–1.97
Total valid votes		4,235	99.44	
Total rejected ballots		24	0.56	+0.25
Turnout		4,259	91.10	+6.42
Eligible voters		4,675		
Liberal gain from Conservative		Swing		+1.97
Source: Elections Ontario

1905 Ontario general election
Party	Candidate	Votes	%	±%
Conservative	Charles Constantine Hodgins	2,069	50.69	+3.12
Liberal	William Henry Taylor	2,013	49.31	–3.12
Total valid votes		4,082	99.68	
Total rejected ballots		13	0.32	–0.43
Turnout		4,095	84.68	+5.61
Eligible voters		4,836		
Conservative gain from Liberal		Swing		+3.12
Source: Elections Ontario

1902 Ontario general election
Party	Candidate	Votes	%	±%
Liberal	William Henry Taylor	2,173	52.44	+1.37
Conservative	Mr. Stewart	1,971	47.56	–1.37
Total valid votes		4,144	99.26	
Total rejected ballots		31	0.74	–0.25
Turnout		4,175	79.07	–0.73
Eligible voters		5,280		
Liberal hold		Swing		+1.37
Source: Elections Ontario

1898 Ontario general election
Party	Candidate	Votes	%	±%
Liberal	William Henry Taylor	2,195	51.07	–0.57
Conservative	Charles Constantine Hodgins	2,103	48.93	+0.57
Total valid votes		4,298	99.01	
Total rejected ballots		43	0.99	+0.48
Turnout		4,341	79.80	+4.01
Eligible voters		5,440		
Liberal hold		Swing		–0.57
Source: Elections Ontario

1894 Ontario general election
Party	Candidate	Votes	%	±%
Liberal-Patrons of Industry	William Henry Taylor	2,015	51.64	+0.59
Conservative-Protestant Protective	J. H. Alexander	1,887	48.36	–0.59
Total valid votes		3,902	99.49	
Total rejected ballots		20	0.51	–0.08
Turnout		3,922	75.79	–2.26
Eligible voters		5,175		
Liberal hold		Swing		+0.59
Source: Elections Ontario

1890 Ontario general election
Party	Candidate	Votes	%	±%
Liberal	John Waters	2,060	51.05	+0.17
Conservative	William Henry Hutchins	1,975	48.95	–0.17
Total valid votes		4,035	99.41	
Total rejected ballots		24	0.59	+0.02
Turnout		4,059	78.04	+3.82
Eligible voters		5,201		
Liberal hold		Swing		+0.17
Source: Elections Ontario

1886 Ontario general election
Party	Candidate	Votes	%	±%
Liberal	John Waters	2,044	50.88	+0.42
Conservative	John Morgan	1,973	49.12	–0.42
Total valid votes		4,017	99.43	
Total rejected ballots		23	0.57	+0.08
Turnout		4,040	74.22	–0.83
Eligible voters		5,443		
Liberal hold		Swing		+0.42
Source: Elections Ontario

1883 Ontario general election
Party	Candidate	Votes	%	±%
Liberal	John Waters	1,946	50.47	–2.75
Conservative	E. Meredith	1,910	49.53	+2.75
Total valid votes		3,856	99.51	
Total rejected ballots		19	0.49	+0.49
Turnout		3,875	75.05	+2.18
Eligible voters		5,163		
Liberal hold		Swing		–2.75
Source: Elections Ontario

1879 Ontario general election
Party	Candidate	Votes	%	±%
Liberal	John Waters	1,917	53.22	+8.11
Conservative	John McDougall	1,685	46.78	−8.11
Total valid votes		3,602	72.87	+0.10
Eligible voters		4,943		
Liberal gain from Conservative		Swing		+8.11
Source: Elections Ontario

1875 Ontario general election
Party	Candidate	Votes	%	±%
Conservative	John McDougall	1,565	54.89	+11.47
Liberal	James Sinclair Smith	1,286	45.11	−11.47
Total valid votes		2,851	72.77	+3.43
Eligible voters		3,918		
Conservative gain from Liberal		Swing		+11.47
Source: Elections Ontario

1871 Ontario general election
Party	Candidate	Votes	%	±%
Liberal	James Sinclair Smith	1,286	56.58	+12.89
Conservative	Mr. McIntosh	987	43.42	+1.26
Turnout		2,273	69.34	−15.45
Eligible voters		3,278		
Liberal hold		Swing		+5.81
Source: Elections Ontario

1867 Ontario general election
Party	Candidate	Votes	%
Liberal	James Sinclair Smith	1,084	43.69
Conservative	John McDougall	1,046	42.16
Independent	Mr. McIntyre	351	14.15
Total valid votes		2,481	84.79
Eligible voters		2,926	
Liberal pickup new district.			
Source: Elections Ontario
