= Alexander Daniel McLean =

Canadian politician from Ontario

Member of the Ontario Provincial Parliament for Middlesex North
- In office December 1, 1926 – September 17, 1929
- Preceded by: George Adam Elliott
- Succeeded by: Fred Van Wyck Laughton

Personal details
- Party: Independent progressive

Alexander Daniel McLean was a Canadian politician who represented Middlesex North as an independent progressive in the Legislative Assembly of Ontario from 1926 to 1929.

== See also ==
- 17th Parliament of Ontario
