= Adam Shortt =

Canadian economic historian (1859–1931)

Adam Shortt CMG FRSC
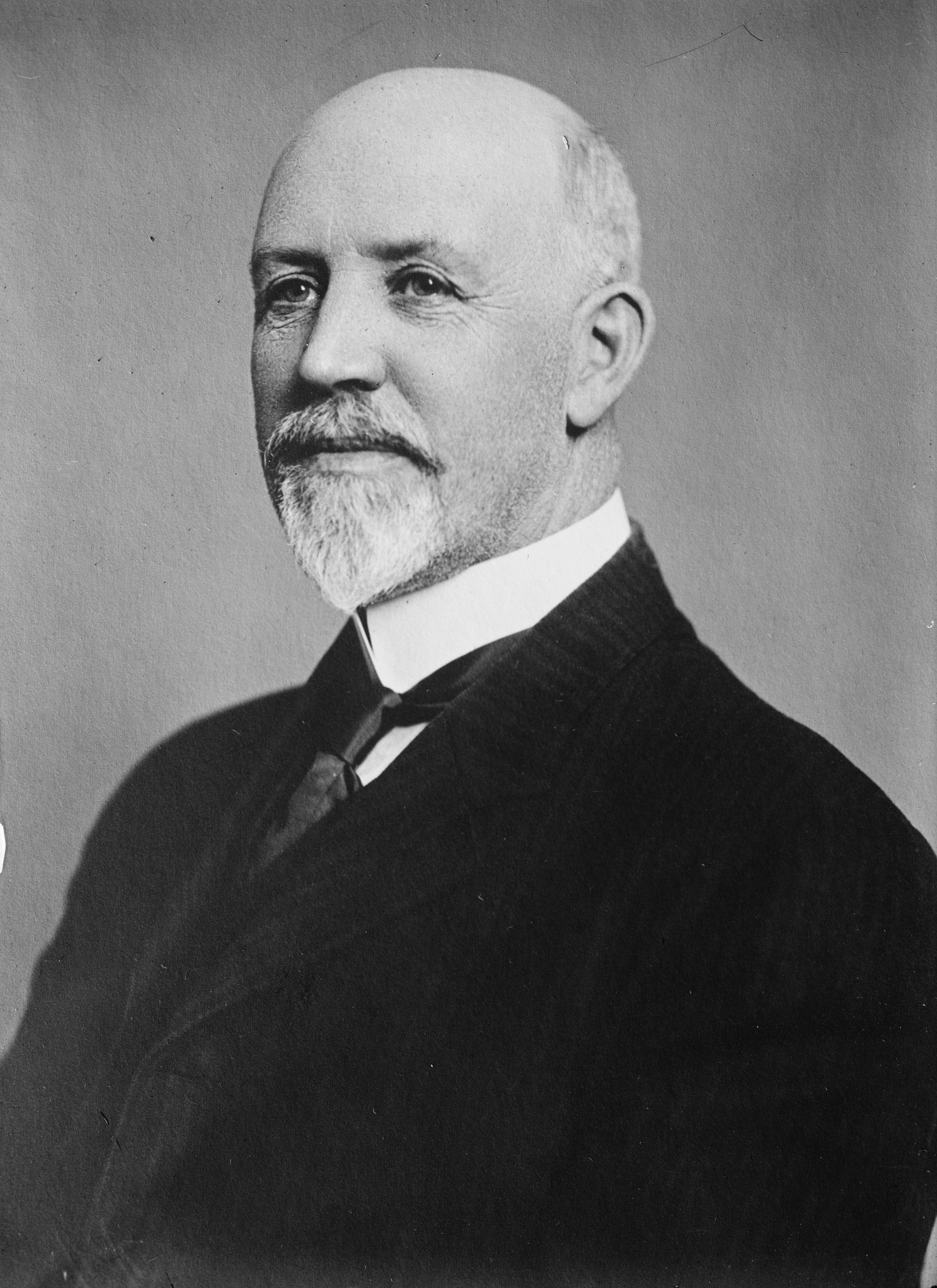
- Shortt by Bain News Service, c. 1920
- Born: 24 November 1859; Kilworth, Ontario, Canada
- Died: 14 January 1931 (aged 71); Ottawa, Canada West
- Spouse: Elizabeth Smith Shortt (m. 1886)

Academic background
- Education: Queen's University
- Influences: John Watson

Academic work
- Discipline: Economics; history; philosophy; political science
- Sub-discipline: Economic history; political economy
- Institutions: Queen's University
- Notable students: Sir Edward Robert Peacock
- Influenced: Andrew Haydon; William B. Munro; Oscar D. Skelton

Adam Shortt CMG FRSC (1859–1931) was an economic historian in Ontario. He was the first full-time employed academic in the field at a Canadian university (Queen's University).

== Biography ==
Shortt was born in Kilworth, Canada West, on 24 November 1859 to George Shortt and Mary Shields. At the age of twenty he attended Queen's University with the intention of becoming a Presbyterian minister. When he graduated in 1883 however, he pursued graduate studies in philosophy, chemistry and botany.

In 1886 Shortt married Elizabeth Smith, one of the first women to receive a medical degree in Canada; they had two daughters and a son together. The same year he began working as a tutor for John Watson, and in 1887 was appointed a lecturer in the field of political economy at Queen's. In 1891 he was the first to be appointed the John A. Macdonald Professor of Political Science. While a lecturer at Queen's, he was appointed as the editor of The Queen's Journal and is largely credited with moving the paper from a strict focus on campus matters to a more mixed discussion on all university interests, particularly to broaden the readership amongst alumni. He is credited with establishing the first card catalogue at the Queen's Library.

Regarded as the father of professional economics in Canada, Shortt took a historical approach as differentiated from economic theory, as he believed that the economics of nations depend on natural resources, geographic location, and specific economic attributes. Shortt went on to Glasgow University for his master's degree in political economy. He is most well known for his research into the history of Canadian banking and for his association with the National Archives of Canada.

In 1906 he was elected a fellow of the Royal Society of Canada and a commander of the Order of St Michael and St George in 1911. He received the Royal Society of Canada's J. B. Tyrrell Historical Medal in 1930. At the time of his death on 14 January 1931, he was a chairman of the Board of Historical Publications at the National Archives, a position he had held since 1918.

== Select publications ==
- 1898: The Early History of Canadian Banking: Canadian Currency and Exchange Under French Rule, Journal of the Canadian Bankers' Association via Internet Archive
- 1904: Imperial Preferential Trade from a Canadian Point of View. Toronto : Morang.
- 1907: The Taxation of Public Service Corporations. Columbus, National Tax Association. 1907.
- 1909: Lord Sydenham. Toronto, Morang.

Professional and academic associations
New office	President of the Canadian Political Science Association; 1913–1914	Succeeded by
