= James William Doyle =

Canadian politician

Member of the Ontario Provincial Parliament for Middlesex North
- In office December 6, 1909 – November 13, 1911
- Preceded by: Duncan Campbell Ross
- Succeeded by: Duncan MacArthur

Personal details
- Party: Conservative

James William Doyle was a Canadian politician from Ontario. He represented Middlesex North in the Legislative Assembly of Ontario from a 1909 by-election until 1911.

== See also ==
- 12th Parliament of Ontario
