= Joseph Reed Sams =

Canadian politician

Member of Parliament for Wentworth
- In office September 1962 – April 1963
- Preceded by: Frank Lennard
- Succeeded by: John B. Morison

Personal details
- Born: 18 August 1923 Clarion, Iowa, United States
- Died: 20 May 2000 (aged 76)
- Party: Progressive Conservative
- Profession: insurance agent

Joseph Reed Sams (18 August 1923 – 20 May 2000) was a Progressive Conservative party member of the House of Commons of Canada. He was born in Clarion, Iowa, United States and had a previous career as an insurance agent.

He was first elected at the Wentworth riding in the 1962 general election. After serving his only federal term in the 25th Canadian Parliament, Sams was defeated in the 1963 federal election by John B. Morison of the Liberal party. Sams attempted to win back the riding in the 1965 election but was not successful in unseating Morison.
