= James A. Macdonald =

Canadian newspaper editor, minister, educator and author

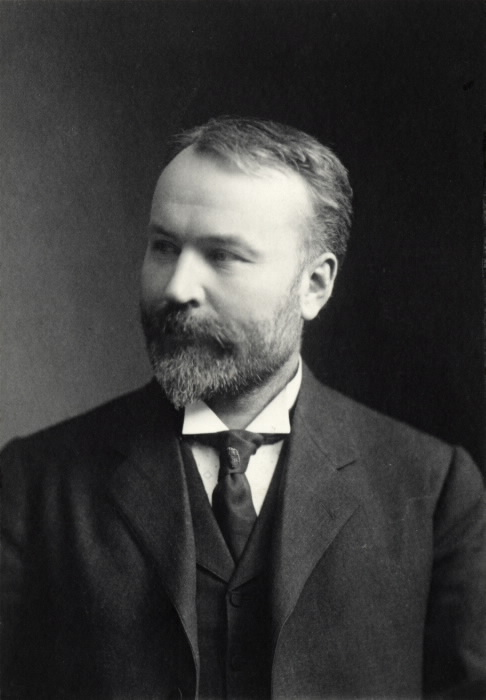
- Born: 22 January 1862
- Died: 14 May 1923 (aged 61)

James Alexander Macdonald (January 22, 1862 – May 14, 1923) was a Canadian newspaper editor, minister, educator and author.

He was born in East Williams Township, Upper Canada, the son of John Alexander Macdonald and Jane Grant, and was educated there, in Hamilton, in Toronto and at the University of Toronto. Macdonald continued his studied at Knox College, where he became editor of the Knox College Monthly. After graduating in 1887, he continued to be editor and also served as college librarian. In 1890, Macdonald married Grace Lumsden Christian. He was ordained a Presbyterian minister in 1891 and assigned to Knox Presbyterian Church in St. Thomas. In 1896, Macdonald was named principal of Presbyterian Ladies' College in Toronto. He also became editor of a new Presbyterian monthly, the Westminster. In 1902, Macdonald also became editor of a new weekly Presbyterian. In 1903, he became editor of the Globe, continuing in that role until 1915. Macdonald also served as a director of the Canadian Associated Press and for the University of Toronto, as a trustee for the Toronto General Hospital. A pacifist, he was a director of the World Peace Foundation and participated in rallies against American involvement in World War I. Later concluding that German aggression needed to be stopped, Macdonald emphasized that the intent of war should be to restore peace. He died in Toronto at the age of 61.

Macdonald published two collections of essays, Democracy and the Nations in 1915 and The North American Idea in 1917, proposing closer ties between Canada and the United States. In the latter year he suffered from both physical and mental breakdowns. These events caused his retirement.
