= Ellis Corman =

Canadian politician (1894–1956)

Member of Parliament for Wentworth
- In office March 1940 – June 1945
- Preceded by: Frank Lennard
- Succeeded by: Frank Lennard

Personal details
- Born: Ellis Hopkins Corman; 22 September 1894 Stoney Creek, Ontario, Canada
- Died: 9 August 1956 (aged 61)
- Party: Liberal
- Spouse(s): Lyda Victoria Bell m. 6 December 1930
- Profession: canner, farmer, fruit grower

Ellis Hopkins Corman (22 September 1894 – 9 August 1956) was a Canadian politician, canner, farmer and fruit grower. Corman served as a Liberal party member of the House of Commons of Canada. He was born in Stoney Creek, Ontario.

Corman attained a Bachelor of Applied Science degree at the University of Toronto.

He was first elected to Parliament at the Wentworth riding in the 1940 general election after an unsuccessful attempt to win that riding in 1935 federal election from Conservative incumbent Frank Lennard. In the 1945 election, Lennard (who by that time was a Progressive Conservative) defeated Corman.
