= E. D. Smith =

Canadian politician

The Honourable E. D. Smith
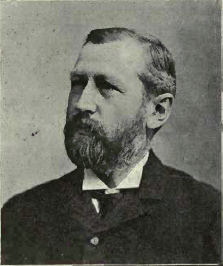

Canadian Senator from Ontario
- In office May 26, 1913 – January 10, 1946
- Appointed by: Robert Borden

Member of Parliament for Wentworth
- In office 1904–1908
- Preceded by: Electoral district created
- Succeeded by: William Oscar Sealey

Member of Parliament for Wentworth South
- In office 1900–1904
- Preceded by: Thomas Bain
- Succeeded by: Electoral district abolished

Personal details
- Born: December 8, 1853 Winona, Canada West
- Died: October 15, 1948 (aged 94)
- Party: Conservative
- Spouse: Christina Ann Smith
- Relatives: Elizabeth Smith Shortt (sister)
- Occupation: businessman and politician

Ernest D'Israeli Smith (December 8, 1853 – October 15, 1948) was a Canadian businessman and politician who founded a food company that bears his name.

== Life ==
Smith was born December 8, 1853 in the hamlet of Winona in what is today Stoney Creek, Ontario. The first of six children, born to Damaris and Sylvester Smith, the family was raised on farmland granted to his father's family, who were United Empire Loyalists. His sister Elizabeth Smith Shortt was one of the first women in Canada to earn a medical degree. Smith married Christina Ann Armstrong in 1886 who became the first president of the Women’s Institute in Stoney Creek in 1897.

In his mature years, Smith relied on his sons to spearhead new business ventures. An expansion to Britain was foiled by the start of the First World War, and continued fruit sales in Canada were reduced by the Great Depression of the 1930s. Consequently, the company concentrated on exporting tomato production since it was more of a staple than fruit.

His farms were a place where women worked during the First World War as part of the Women's Work on the Land program. This program brought female university students onto farms during the summer to help with food production.

After the start of the Second World War, E.D. Smith & Sons Ltd. acquired the Canadian rights to H.P. Sauce Ltd. of Britain, and in 1948, the latter's subsidiary, Lea & Perrins Ltd. On October 15, 1948, E.D. Smith died. The private company bearing his name was sold to Imperial Capital in 2001. In October 2007, it became a wholly owned subsidiary of TreeHouse Foods, Inc. It was sold in October 2022 to Investindustrial becoming part of Winland Foods. Its current product line includes jams and spreads, syrups, pie fillings, ketchup, sauces, and salad dressings.

The E.D. Smith archives and collection (family and factory) are currently housed in the Erland Lee Museum in Stoney Creek

== Political career ==
Smith was elected to the House of Commons of Canada as the Conservative Member of Parliament (MP) for Wentworth South in 1900. Under redistribution, four years later, Smith was re-elected as MP for the combined constituency of Wentworth, which covered all of Wentworth County outside Hamilton. He won a by-election in 1905.

Smith was appointed to the Senate in 1913 and served until he resigned in 1946, just two years before his death.

1900 Canadian federal election: Wentworth South
Party	Candidate	Votes	%	±%
Conservative	Ernest D'Israeli Smith	2,584		
Liberal	William Oscar Sealey	2,428		
