= William Henry Hutchins =

Canadian politician

William Henry Hutchins (1843 – May 19, 1898) was a grain merchant and political figure in Ontario, Canada. He represented Middlesex North in the House of Commons of Canada from 1891 to 1896 as a Conservative member.

He was born in Stormont County, Canada West. He married a Miss Armitage. Hutchins was reeve for Lucan and served as the first mayor of Parkhill. He was defeated when he ran for reelection in 1896.

1891 Canadian federal election: Middlesex North
Party	Candidate	Votes
Conservative	W. H. Hutchins	1,965
Liberal	W. H. Taylor	1,959

1896 Canadian federal election: Middlesex North
Party	Candidate	Votes
Liberal	Valentine Ratz	2,184
Conservative	William H. Hutchins	2,122
