= Wentworth (electoral district) =

Former federal electoral district in Ontario, Canada

Ontario electoral district

Defunct federal electoral district
- Legislature: House of Commons
- District created: 1903
- District abolished: 1966
- First contested: 1904
- Last contested: 1965

Wentworth was a federal electoral district represented in the House of Commons of Canada from 1904 to 1968. It was located near the City of Hamilton in the province of Ontario. This riding was first created in 1903 from parts of Wentworth North and Brant and Wentworth South ridings.

Wentworth initially consisted of the county of Wentworth, excluding of the city of Hamilton. In 1914, it was expanded to include those portions of the city of Hamilton not included in Hamilton East and Hamilton West ridings.

In 1947, it was redefined to consist of the county of Wentworth (excluding the townships of Beverly, Ancaster, Glanford and Binbrook), and the northern part the city of Hamilton. In 1952, it was again defined as being the county of Wentworth, excluding the city of Hamilton.

The electoral district was abolished in 1966 when it was redistributed between Halton—Wentworth, Hamilton Mountain, Hamilton—Wentworth and Wellington ridings.

== Members of Parliament ==
This riding elected the following members of the House of Commons of Canada:

Parliament	Years	Member	Party
Riding created from Wentworth North and Brant and Wentworth South
10th	1904–1905	E. D. Smith	Conservative
10th	1905–1908	E. D. Smith	Conservative
11th	1908–1911	William Oscar Sealey	Liberal
12th	1911–1917	Gordon Crooks Wilson	Conservative
13th	1917–1921	Gordon Crooks Wilson	Government (Unionist)
14th	1921–1925	Gordon Crooks Wilson	Conservative
15th	1925–1926	Gordon Crooks Wilson	Conservative
16th	1926–1930	Gordon Crooks Wilson	Conservative
17th	1930–1935	Gordon Crooks Wilson	Conservative
18th	1935–1940	Frank Lennard	Conservative
19th	1940–1945	Ellis Corman	Liberal
20th	1945–1949	Frank Lennard	Progressive Conservative
21st	1949–1953	Frank Lennard	Progressive Conservative
22nd	1953–1957	Frank Lennard	Progressive Conservative
23rd	1957–1958	Frank Lennard	Progressive Conservative
24th	1958–1962	Frank Lennard	Progressive Conservative
25th	1962–1963	Joseph Reed Sams	Progressive Conservative
26th	1963–1965	John B. Morison	Liberal
27th	1965–1968	John B. Morison	Liberal
Riding dissolved into Halton—Wentworth, Hamilton—Wentworth, Hamilton Mountain and Wellington

== Election results ==
1904 Canadian federal election: Wentworth
Party	Candidate	Votes	%	±%
Conservative	E. D. Smith	2,899		
Liberal	William Oscar Sealey	2,889		

By-election: On election being declared void, 22 November 1905: Wentworth
Party	Candidate	Votes	%	±%
Conservative	E. D. Smith	2,982		
Liberal	William Oscar Sealey	2,965		

1908 Canadian federal election: Wentworth
Party	Candidate	Votes	%	±%
Liberal	William Oscar Sealey	3,307		
Conservative	William Hall Ptolemy	2,961		

1911 Canadian federal election: Wentworth
Party	Candidate	Votes	%	±%
Conservative	Gordon Crooks Wilson	3,832		
Liberal	William Oscar Sealey	2,939		

1917 Canadian federal election: Wentworth
Party	Candidate	Votes	%	±%
Government (Unionist)	Gordon Crooks Wilson	9,070		
Opposition (Laurier Liberals)	John Herbert Dickenson	3,387		
Labour	Frederick James Flatman	1,507		

1921 Canadian federal election: Wentworth
Party	Candidate	Votes	%	±%
Conservative	Gordon Crooks Wilson	9,375		
Progressive	Christopher Frederic Woodley	9,246		
Liberal	Walter Thompson Evans	3,177		

1925 Canadian federal election: Wentworth
Party	Candidate	Votes	%	±%
Conservative	Gordon Crooks Wilson	12,970		
Progressive	Christopher Frederic Thomas Woodley	5,213		

1926 Canadian federal election: Wentworth
Party	Candidate	Votes	%	±%
Conservative	Gordon Crooks Wilson	10,975		
Liberal	Harold Stanley Burns	5,335		

1930 Canadian federal election: Wentworth
Party	Candidate	Votes	%	±%
Conservative	Gordon Crooks Wilson	13,436		
Liberal	Frank Campbell Biggs	9,628		
Unknown	Samuel Radcliffe Weaver	1,630		

1935 Canadian federal election: Wentworth
Party	Candidate	Votes	%	±%
Conservative	Frank Lennard	9,958		
Liberal	Ellis Corman	9,740		
Reconstruction	William James Peace	5,978		
Co-operative Commonwealth	Robert James Hanna	4,513		

1940 Canadian federal election: Wentworth
Party	Candidate	Votes	%	±%
Liberal	Ellis Corman	15,714		
National Government	Frank Lennard	14,949		

1945 Canadian federal election: Wentworth
Party	Candidate	Votes	%	±%
Progressive Conservative	Frank Lennard	15,458		
Liberal	Ellis Corman	13,652		
Co-operative Commonwealth	John O'Hanley	11,914		

1949 Canadian federal election: Wentworth
Party	Candidate	Votes	%	±%
Progressive Conservative	Frank Lennard	16,443		
Liberal	Henry Arnott Hicks	13,312		
Co-operative Commonwealth	David Lewis	11,638		
Labor–Progressive	Stanley Bréhaut Ryerson	1,028		
Independent	Charles Giles	562		

1953 Canadian federal election: Wentworth
Party	Candidate	Votes	%	±%
Progressive Conservative	Frank Lennard	10,476		
Liberal	Reginald Wheeler	7,700		
Co-operative Commonwealth	Isaac Reginald Gardiner	3,915		

1957 Canadian federal election: Wentworth
Party	Candidate	Votes	%	±%
Progressive Conservative	Frank Lennard	19,037		
Liberal	Edwin Delbert Hickey	8,922		
Co-operative Commonwealth	John Joseph Zuliniak	4,905		

1958 Canadian federal election: Wentworth
Party	Candidate	Votes	%	±%
Progressive Conservative	Frank Lennard	23,854		
Liberal	William Kitchen Dunham	7,578		
Co-operative Commonwealth	John Joseph Zuliniak	4,972		

1962 Canadian federal election: Wentworth
Party	Candidate	Votes	%	±%
Progressive Conservative	Joseph Reed Sams	17,050		
Liberal	John B. Morison	16,434		
New Democratic	John Joseph Zuliniak	16,434		
Social Credit	Gordon C. Fisher	806		

1963 Canadian federal election: Wentworth
Party	Candidate	Votes	%	±%
Liberal	John B. Morison	18,589		
Progressive Conservative	Joseph Reed Sams	17,640		
New Democratic	Harry Pomeroy	8,088		

1965 Canadian federal election: Wentworth
Party	Candidate	Votes	%	±%
Liberal	John B. Morison	17,746		
Progressive Conservative	Joseph Reed Sams	15,991		
New Democratic	Reginald Gardiner	13,735		
Social Credit	Gordon C. Fisher	362		

== See also ==
- List of Canadian electoral districts
- Historical federal electoral districts of Canada
