= John B. Morison =

Canadian politician

Official 1968 portrait

John B. Morison (November 17, 1923 – September 2, 1996) was an Ontario businessman and political figure. He represented Wentworth (electoral district) and then Halton—Wentworth in three consecutive Canadian Parliaments as a Liberal member from 1963 until his retirement in 1972.

He was born in Hamilton, Ontario, Canada in 1923. During World War II Morison served in the RCAF as an officer aboard a Handley Page Halifax. After his first full tour of duty, Morison volunteered to fill spare spots on numerous sorties. On April 27, 1944 his aircraft was shot down and he became a POW. After the war, he returned to Hamilton where he started his business career as an insurance broker. After serving parliament he lived in Ottawa, Ontario until his death in 1996.
