= Alexander Wilson Smith =

Canadian politician

Alexander Wilson Smith (November 12, 1856 – October 10, 1913) was a farmer and political figure in Ontario, Canada. He represented Middlesex North in the House of Commons of Canada from 1908 to 1911 as a Liberal.

He was born in York County, Canada West, the son of James Sinclair Smith, a native of Scotland, and Agnes Wilson, and was educated at the Rockwood Academy and the Canadian Literary Institute in Woodstock, Ontario. Smith was a farmer and livestock breeder at Maple Lodge, Middlesex County. Smith was defeated when he ran for reelection in 1911. He died in Ailsa Craig at the age of 56.

1908 Canadian federal election: Middlesex North
Party	Candidate	Votes
Liberal	Alexander Wilson Smith	1,842
Conservative	James William Doyle	1,779

1911 Canadian federal election: Middlesex North
Party	Candidate	Votes
Conservative	George Elliot	1,768
Liberal	Alexander Wilson Smith	1,715
