= John Sherritt =

Canadian politician

John Sherritt (November 22, 1851 – September 14, 1923) was a farmer and political figure in Ontario, Canada. He represented Middlesex North in the House of Commons of Canada from 1900 to 1904 as a Conservative.

He was born in Stanley Township, Huron County, Canada West, the son of John Sherritt and Mary Armstrong. In 1882, he married Letitia Keys. Sherritt farmed and raised livestock. He was also a director of the Hay Township Fire Insurance Company. He served on the council for Stephen Township and was reeve from 1899 to 1900. Sherritt defeated the Liberal incumbent Valentine Ratz in the 1900 federal election. He did not run for reelection in 1904, but was an unsuccessful candidate for the federal seat in Huron South in 1908. Sherritt moved to Guelph around 1915, working as a provincial purchasing agent. About three years later, he moved to Blanshard Township in Perth County, where he died at the age of 71.
