= John Scatcherd =

Canadian politician and farmer

John Scatcherd (21 January 1800 – 15 June 1858) was a farmer, merchant and political figure in Canada West. He represented West Middlesex in the Legislative Assembly of the Province of Canada from 1854 to 1858.

He came to Upper Canada from Wyton, Yorkshire, England in 1821. Scatcherd married Anne Farley. He settled on a farm at Wyton in West Nissouri Township; in 1831, he moved to London, where he opened a store, the first to sell hardware in London. Scatcherd was named a magistrate for the Court of Quarter Sessions in 1834. He ran unsuccessfully against Mahlon Burwell in 1836 for the London seat in the Parliament of Upper Canada. He later returned to Wyton. Scatcherd was the first warden for Middlesex County. He also served as warden for Oxford County, the first postmaster for Wyton and superintendent of education. Scatcherd was also a lieutenant colonel for the county militia. He died in office in 1858.

His sons Thomas and Robert Colin both served as members of the Canadian House of Commons.
