= Thomas Patrick (Ontario politician) =

Canadian farmer and politician (1896–1957)

Thomas L. Patrick (1896 – January 10, 1957) was a Canadian farmer and politician in Ontario. He served as a Progressive Conservative MPP in the Legislative Assembly of Ontario for the riding of Middlesex North from 1943 until his death in 1957, at the age of 60. Patrick was a farmer and livestock exporter and died of a heart attack during a business trip to Springfield, Illinois. In the legislature, he served as chairman of the Agriculture Committee. He was first elected in the 1943 Ontario general election, defeating incumbent Liberal MPP John Willard Freeborn by 910 votes.
