= Lewis Springer =

Canadian politician

Lewis Springer (October 30, 1835 – November 25, 1895) was a farmer and political figure in Ontario, Canada. He represented Wentworth South in the House of Commons of Canada from 1882 to 1887 as a Liberal member.

He was born in Hamilton, Upper Canada, a descendant of United Empire Loyalists, and was educated at Victoria College in Cobourg.
