= Duncan MacArthur (Ontario politician) =

Canadian politician from Ontario

Member of the Ontario Provincial Parliament for Middlesex North
- In office December 11, 1911 – May 29, 1914
- Preceded by: James William Doyle
- Succeeded by: John Grieve

Personal details
- Party: Conservative

Duncan MacArthur was a Canadian politician from Ontario. He represented Middlesex North in the Legislative Assembly of Ontario from 1911 to 1914.

== See also ==
- 13th Parliament of Ontario
