= Thomas Scatcherd =

Canadian politician

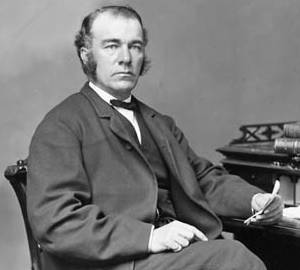
Thomas Scatcherd Source: Library and Archives Canada

Thomas Scatcherd (November 10, 1823 – April 15, 1876) was a Canadian lawyer and political figure. He represented Middlesex North as a Liberal member of the House of Commons of Canada from 1867 to 1876.

He was born in Wyton in Middlesex County, Upper Canada in 1823. His father, John Scatcherd, represented West Middlesex in the Legislative Assembly of the Province of Canada from 1854 until his death in 1858. He married Isabella Sprague, granddaughter of Elias Moore, who had represented Middlesex in the Legislative Assembly during the Rebellions of 1837.^{1} Thomas articled in law in London and Toronto and entered practice in 1849. In 1849, he became solicitor for the town of London. In 1861, he was elected to the Legislative Assembly for West Middlesex; he was reelected in 1863. He opposed Confederation because he felt that it was structured to favour Canada East. With George Brown, he strongly opposed a bill introduced in 1866 to extend privileges to Roman Catholic schools in Canada West which were being proposed for Protestant schools in Canada East by Alexander Tilloch Galt; their resistance led to the withdrawal of both bills and the resignation of Galt.

He died in Ottawa in 1876 while in office. His brother Robert Colin represented Middlesex North from 1876 to 1878.

1867 Canadian federal election: Middlesex North
Party	Candidate	Votes
Liberal	Thomas Scatcherd	1,605
Unknown	Mr. Watson	874

1872 Canadian federal election: Middlesex North
Party	Candidate	Votes
Liberal	Thomas Scatcherd	1,605
Liberal	Thomas Scatcherd	acclaimed

1874 Canadian federal election: Middlesex North
Party	Candidate	Votes
Liberal	Thomas Scatcherd	1,605
Liberal	Thomas Scatcherd	acclaimed
