= Wentworth South (federal electoral district) =

Former federal electoral district in Ontario, Canada

Wentworth South was a federal electoral district represented in the House of Commons of Canada from 1867 to 1904. it was located near Hamilton in the province of Ontario.

It was created by the British North America Act 1867. The "South Riding of Wentworth" initially consisted of the Townships of Saltfleet, Binbrook, Glanford, Barton and Ancaster. In 1882, the townships of Grimsby and Caistor, and the village of Grimsby were added, while the Township of Ancaster was removed.

In 1892, it was called "South Wentworth" and redefined to consist of the townships of Saltfleet, Binbrooke, Barton, Glanford, North and South Grimsby, Caistor, East and West Flamborough, the town of Dundas, and the villages of Grimsby and Waterdown.

The electoral district was abolished in 1903 when it was redistributed between Lincoln and Wentworth ridings.

== Electoral history ==
1867 Canadian federal election
Party	Candidate	Votes	%	±%
Liberal	Joseph Rymal	1,015		
Unknown	Thomas Robertson	988		

1872 Canadian federal election
Party	Candidate	Votes	%	±%
Liberal	Joseph Rymal	1,203		
Unknown	A. Bethune	995		

1874 Canadian federal election
Party	Candidate	Votes	%	±%
Liberal	Joseph Rymal	1,184		
Conservative	H.B. Bull	875		
Source: lop.parl.ca

1878 Canadian federal election
Party	Candidate	Votes	%	±%
Liberal	Joseph Rymal	1,169		
Unknown	Franklin Metcalfe Carpenter	1,095		

1882 Canadian federal election
Party	Candidate	Votes	%	±%
Liberal	Lewis Springer	1,253		
Unknown	R.R. Waddell	1,205		

1887 Canadian federal election
Party	Candidate	Votes	%	±%
Conservative	F.M. Carpenter	1,839		
Liberal	Jas. Russell	1,663		

1891 Canadian federal election
Party	Candidate	Votes	%	±%
Conservative	F.M. Carpenter	1,773		
Liberal	Jas. T. Middleton	1,772		

1896 Canadian federal election
Party	Candidate	Votes	%	±%
Liberal	Thomas Bain	2,673		
Conservative	Andrew H. Pettit	2,486		

1900 Canadian federal election
Party	Candidate	Votes	%	±%
Conservative	Ernest D'Israeli Smith	2,584		
Liberal	William Oscar Sealey	2,428		

== See also ==
- List of Canadian electoral districts
- Historical federal electoral districts of Canada
