= William Oscar Sealey =

Canadian politician

William Oscar Sealey (January 26, 1859 – January 7, 1940) was a farmer, lumber merchant and political figure in Ontario, Canada. He represented Wentworth in the House of Commons of Canada from 1908 to 1911 as a Liberal.

He was born in Waterdown, Canada West, the son of Charles Sealey and Mary Ann Eaton. In 1881, he married Agnes Annie Forbes. He lived in Hamilton. Sealey served on the council for Wentworth County and was reeve of East Flamborough Township. Sealey ran unsuccessfully for a seat in the House of Commons in 1900, 1904 and 1905, losing to E. D. Smith each time, before being elected in 1908. He was defeated when he ran for reelection in 1911. He died in Dundas at the age of 80.

For a time, Sealey operated a private bank in Waterdown and lived on the floor above. In 1887, he interrupted a robbery in progress by firing his revolver after the would-be robbers blew open the bank's safe. Apparently, no money was stolen.
