= Robert Colin Scatcherd =

Canadian politician

Robert Colin Scatcherd (November 12, 1832 – February 20, 1879) was a lawyer and political figure in Ontario, Canada. He represented Middlesex North in the House of Commons of Canada from 1876 to 1878 as a Liberal member.

He was born in London, Upper Canada, the son of John Scatcherd. In 1863, he married Margaret Oliver. Scatcherd studied law with his brother Thomas and set up practice in Strathroy in 1862. He served as solicitor for Strathroy from 1863 to 1873 and was mayor from 1874 to 1876. Scatcherd was elected to the House of Commons in an 1876 by-election held following the death of his brother. He was defeated when he ran for reelection in 1878.

On Mr. Scatcherd's death, 15 April 1876:

By-election on 7 June 1876
Party	Candidate	Votes
Liberal	Robert Colin Scatcherd	1,576
Unknown	John Levi	1,318

1878 Canadian federal election: Middlesex North
Party	Candidate	Votes
Liberal–Conservative	Timothy Coughlin	1,629
Liberal	Robert Colin Scatcherd	1,621
