= Middlesex North (federal electoral district) =

Former federal electoral district in Ontario, Canada

Ontario electoral district

Defunct federal electoral district
- Legislature: House of Commons
- District created: 1867
- District abolished: 1914
- First contested: 1867
- Last contested: 1911

Middlesex North was a federal electoral district in Ontario, Canada, that was represented in the House of Commons of Canada from 1867 to 1917. It was created by the British North America Act 1867 which divided the County of Middlesex into three ridings: the Middlesex North, Middlesex West and Middlesex East.

The North Riding consisted of the Townships of McGillivray and Biddulph (taken from the County of Huron), and Williams East, Williams West, Adelaide, and Lobo.

In 1882, it was redefined add the township of Stephen and the villages of Ailsa Craig, Lucan, Exeter and Parkhill, and to exclude the townships of Adelaide and Lobo.

In 1903, it was redefined to consist of the townships of Adelaide, Biddulph, Lobo, McGillivray, Williams East and Williams West, the town of Parkhill and the villages of Ailsa Craig and Lucan.

The electoral district was abolished in 1914 when it was redistributed between Middlesex East and Middlesex West ridings.

== Members of Parliament ==
This riding has elected the following members of Parliament:

Parliament	Years	Member	Party
1st	1867–1872	Thomas Scatcherd	Liberal
2nd	1872–1874	Thomas Scatcherd	Liberal
3rd	1874–1876	Thomas Scatcherd	Liberal
3rd	1876–1878	Robert Colin Scatcherd	Liberal
4th	1878–1882	Timothy Coughlin	Liberal–Conservative
5th	1882–1887	Timothy Coughlin	Liberal–Conservative
6th	1887–1891	Timothy Coughlin	Liberal–Conservative
7th	1891–1896	William Henry Hutchins	Conservative
8th	1896–1900	Valentine Ratz	Liberal
9th	1900–1904	John Sherritt	Conservative
10th	1904–1908	Valentine Ratz	Liberal
11th	1908–1911	Alexander Wilson Smith	Liberal
12th	1911–1917	George Adam Elliott	Conservative
Riding dissolved into Middlesex East and Middlesex West

== Election history ==
1867 Canadian federal election
Party	Candidate	Votes
Liberal	Thomas Scatcherd	1,605
Unknown	Mr. Watson	874

1872 Canadian federal election
Party	Candidate	Votes
Liberal	Thomas Scatcherd	1,605
Liberal	Thomas Scatcherd	acclaimed

1874 Canadian federal election
Party	Candidate	Votes
Liberal	Thomas Scatcherd	1,605
Liberal	Thomas Scatcherd	acclaimed

On Mr. Scatcherd's death, 15 April 1876:

By-election on 7 June 1876
Party	Candidate	Votes
Liberal	Robert Colin Scatcherd	1,576
Unknown	John Levi	1,318

1878 Canadian federal election
Party	Candidate	Votes
Liberal–Conservative	Timothy Coughlin	1,629
Liberal	Robert Colin Scatcherd	1,621

1882 Canadian federal election
Party	Candidate	Votes
Liberal–Conservative	Timothy Coughlin	1,741
Unknown	L. E. Shipley	1,632

1887 Canadian federal election
Party	Candidate	Votes
Liberal–Conservative	T. Coughlin	2,133
Unknown	L. E. Shipley	1,864

1891 Canadian federal election
Party	Candidate	Votes
Conservative	W. H. Hutchins	1,965
Liberal	W. H. Taylor	1,959

1896 Canadian federal election
Party	Candidate	Votes
Liberal	Valentine Ratz	2,184
Conservative	William H. Hutchins	2,122

1900 Canadian federal election
Party	Candidate	Votes
Conservative	John Sherritt	2,221
Liberal	Valentine Ratz	2,008

1904 Canadian federal election
Party	Candidate	Votes
Liberal	Valentine Ratz	1,894
Liberal	Robert Boston	1,598

1908 Canadian federal election
Party	Candidate	Votes
Liberal	Alexander Wilson Smith	1,842
Conservative	James William Doyle	1,779

1911 Canadian federal election
Party	Candidate	Votes
Conservative	George Elliot	1,768
Liberal	Alexander Wilson Smith	1,715

== See also ==
- List of Canadian electoral districts
- Historical federal electoral districts of Canada
