= North Middlesex =

Municipality in Middlesex County, Ontario, Canada

- Municipality (lower-tier)
- Municipality of North Middlesex
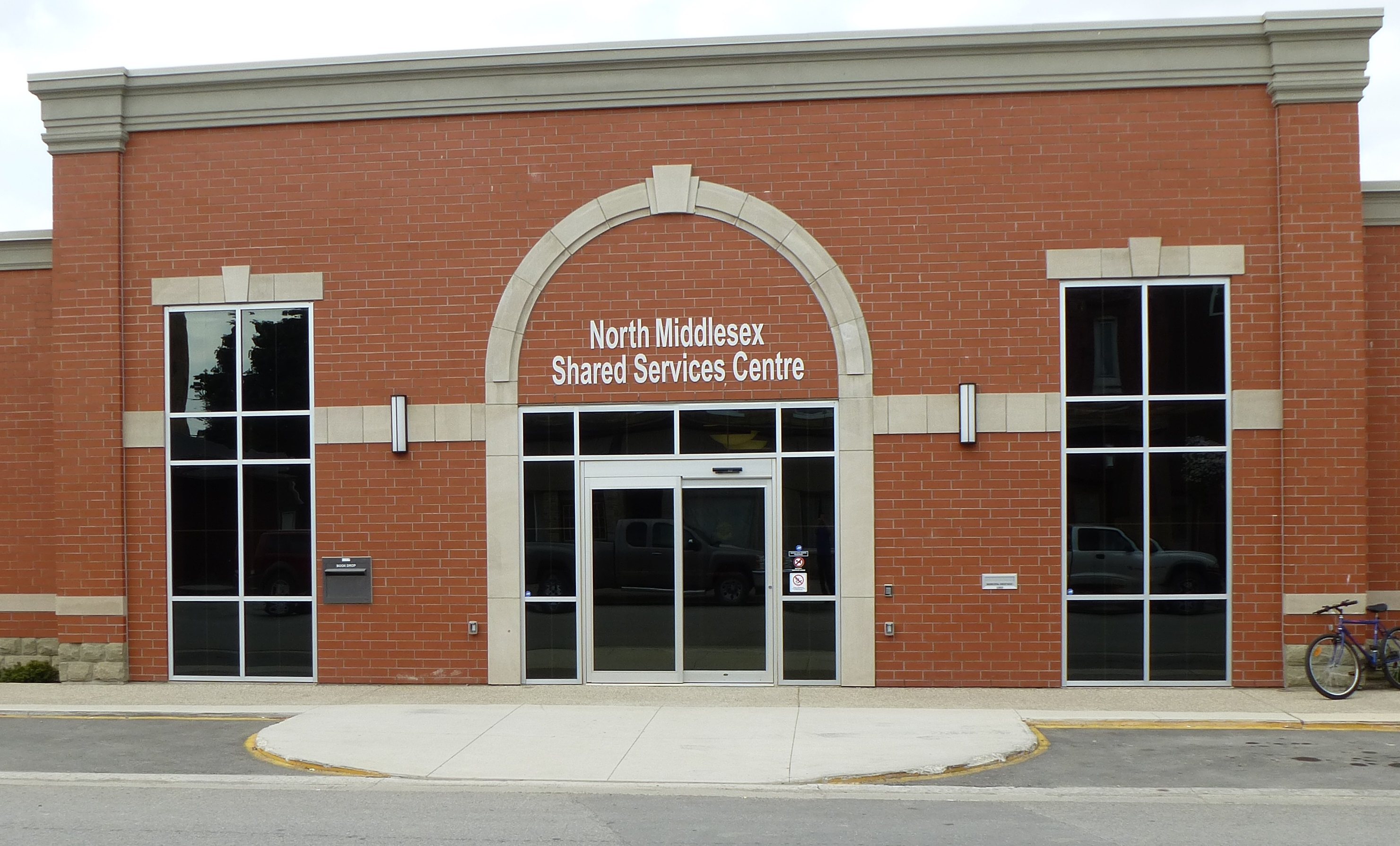
- Municipal office of North Middlesex in Parkhill

- Location within Middlesex County Location within Southern Ontario
- Coordinates: 43°09′N 81°38′W
- Country: Canada
- Province: Ontario
- County: Middlesex
- Formed: January 1, 2001

Government
  - Mayor: Brian Ropp
  - Federal riding: Middlesex—London
  - Prov. riding: Lambton—Kent—Middlesex

Area
  - Land: 597.88 km^{2} (230.84 sq mi)

Population (2016)
  - Total: 6,352
  - Density: 10.6/km^{2} (27/sq mi)
- Time zone: UTC-5 (EST)
  - Summer (DST): UTC-4 (EDT)
- Postal Code: N0M
- Area codes: 519 and 226
- Website: www.northmiddlesex.on.ca

North Middlesex is a municipality in Middlesex County, Ontario, Canada.

The restructured municipality of North Middlesex was incorporated on January 1, 2001. This amalgamation joined five municipalities — the townships of East Williams, West Williams and McGillivray, the town of Parkhill and the village of Ailsa Craig — to form one municipal corporation. North Middlesex has a population of 6,658 as of the Canada 2011 Census.

North Middlesex is located in the north of Middlesex County, north of London, Ontario.

== Communities ==
=== Ailsa Craig ===
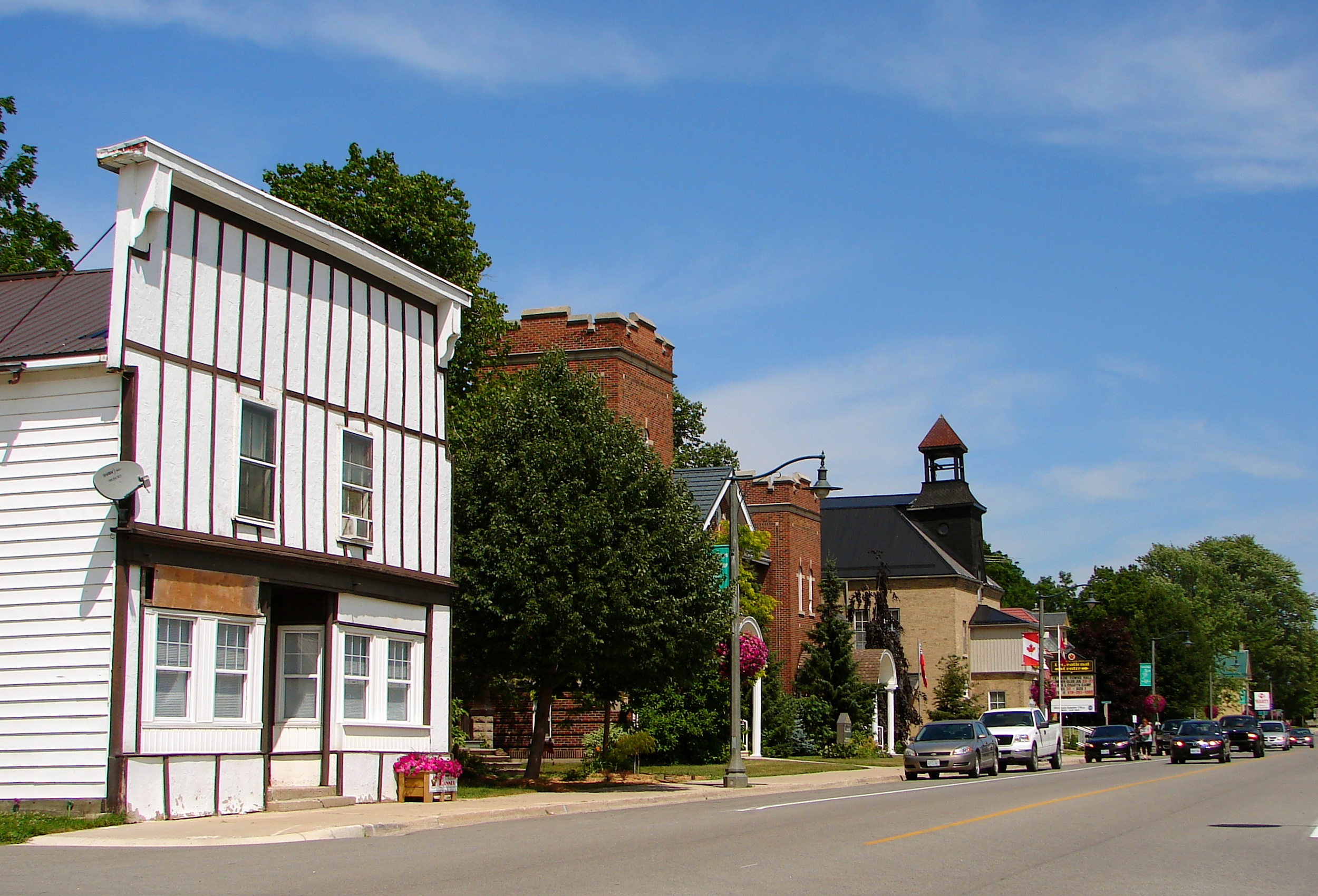
Ailsa Craig

Ailsa Craig is a community on the Ausable River. Ailsa Craig is best known for its annual Gala Days event. The town was the home of Earl Ross, the first non-American to win a NASCAR Cup Series race, which he did in 1974. Earl was also NASCAR Winston Cup Rookie of the year in 1974.

The winningest harness horse driver in the world also hails from the Ailsa Craig area. With over 10,000 wins, John Campbell is one of the youngest members to enter the Harness Horseman's Hall of Fame.

Ailsa Craig was named by the Craig family after a namesake island in the outer Firth of Clyde, Scotland, and the word is derived from the Gaelic, Aillse Creag, or Creag Ealasaid, meaning "Elizabeth's rock". In the early 20th century, Ailsa Craig was a thriving village with several hotels, mills and served as the commercial hub for the farm businesses in the area. Located on the Grand Trunk Railway, Ailsa Craig was once the second largest cattle shipping centre in all of Canada surpassed only by Calgary, Alberta.

As a child, Norman Bethune often spent his summers in the village.

Canadian astronaut Jeremy Hansen, who famously travelled around the far side of the Moon as a member of the Artemis II NASA mission in April 2026, was raised on a farm near Ailsa Craig. He is the only Canadian to have ever left low-Earth orbit, and along with his Artemis II crew members holds the record for the furthest distance travelled into space by a human in history.

=== Parkhill ===
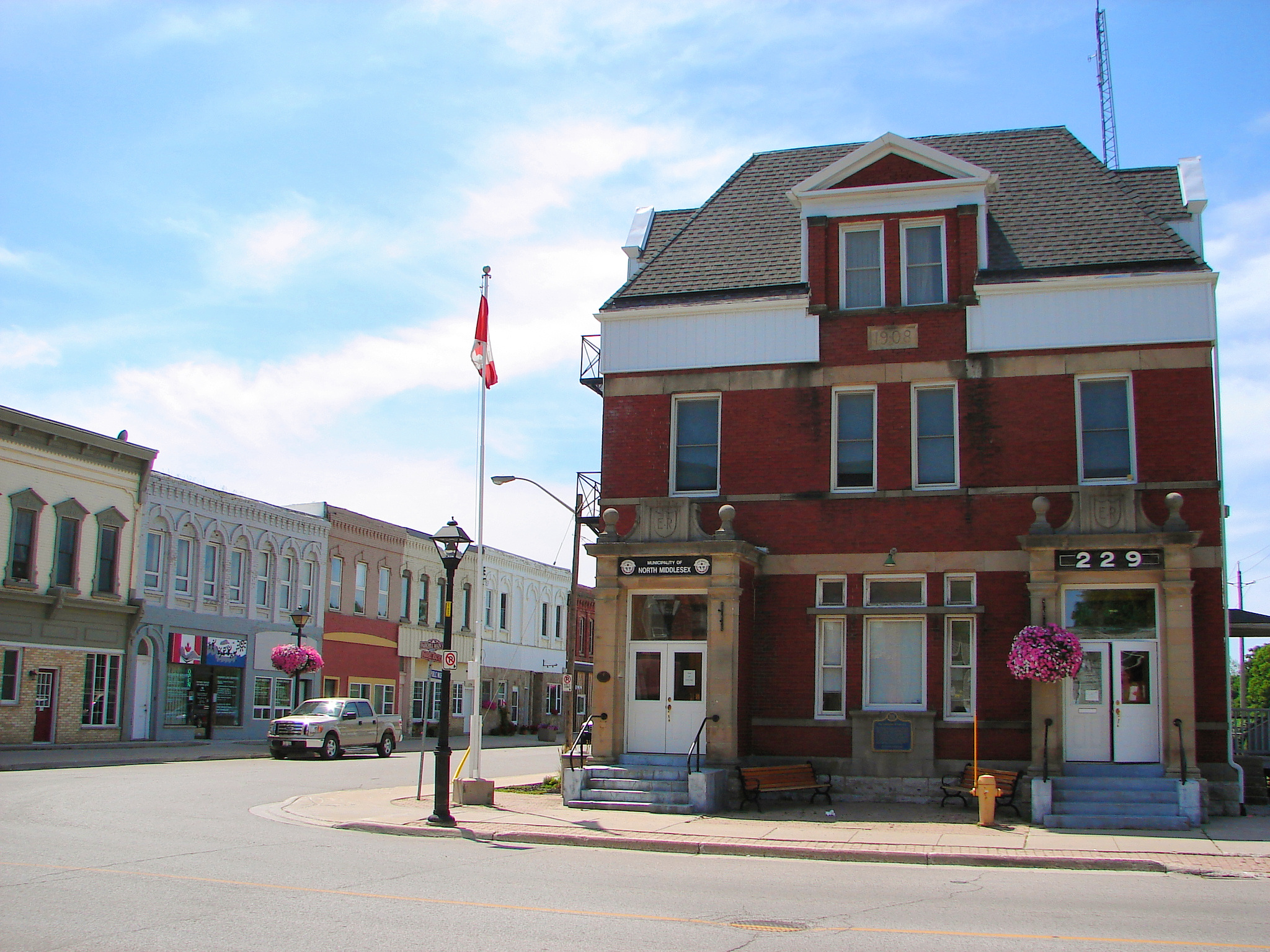
Parkhill

Parkhill owes its beginning to the coming of the railway. In 1859, the Grand Trunk Railway completed a line from St. Mary's to Sarnia. The following year the first Post Office and store were opened at the present site of Parkhill.

Parkhill was originally known as Westwood, named Swainsby in 1861 and finally Parkhill in 1863. Parkhill's growth was slow at first until a grist mill was constructed in the community. Other industries including saw mills, a foundry, a flax mill and a woollen mill became a part of Parkhill. By 1871, the community had a population of 1500. Parkhill was incorporated as a village in 1872 and as a town in 1886. Many fine old Victorian commercial buildings such as the Cheapside Block and Gibbs Block can be found located along Main Street. Parkhill also has many handsome churches and houses throughout the town. The township's administrative offices are located in Parkhill.

Just outside of the modern town of Parkhill, the Parkhill National Historic Site of Canada marks the location of the earliest indigenous archaeological site yet discovered in Ontario, with artifacts dating to approximately 8800 BC.

=== Other communities ===
The township also contains the communities of Beechwood, Bornish, Bowood, Brinsley, Carlisle, Corbett, Greenway, Hungry Hollow, Lieury, Moray, Mount Carmel, Nairn, Sable, Springbank, Sylvan and West McGillivray. The communities of Clandeboye, Lucan Crossing, Mooresville are divided by the municipal boundary with Lucan Biddulph.

== Demographics ==
Historical population
Year	Pop.	±%
1996	6,978	—
2001	6,901	−1.1%
2006	6,740	−2.3%
2011	6,658	−1.2%
2016	6,352	−4.6%

In the 2021 Census of Population conducted by Statistics Canada, North Middlesex had a population of 6,307 living in 2,391 of its 2,481 total private dwellings, a change of −0.7% from its 2016 population of 6,352. With a land area of 598.65 km^{2} (231.14 sq mi), it had a population density of 10.5/km^{2} (27.3/sq mi) in 2021.

Canada census – North Middlesex community profile

	2021	2016	2011
Population	6,307 (-0.7% from 2016)	6,352 (-4.6% from 2011)	6,658 (-1.2% from 2006)
Land area	598.65 km^{2} (231.14 sq mi)	597.88 km^{2} (230.84 sq mi)	597.90 km^{2} (230.85 sq mi)
Population density	10.5/km^{2} (27/sq mi)	10.6/km^{2} (27/sq mi)	11.1/km^{2} (29/sq mi)
Median age	44 (M: 42, F: 46)	43.0 (M: 41.2, F: 44.7)	41.4 (M: 39.8, F: 42.5)
Private dwellings	2,390 (total)	2,399 (total)	2,483 (total)
Median household income		$78,426

References: 2021 2016 2011

== See also ==
- List of townships in Ontario

== Notable people ==
- John Campbell (born 1955), harness racing driver
- Jeremy Hansen (born January 27, 1976), astronaut
- James A. Macdonald (1862 – 1923), newspaper editor and minister
- Earl Ross (1941 – 2014), NASCAR driver
