= John Turmel =

Perennial candidate for election in Canada

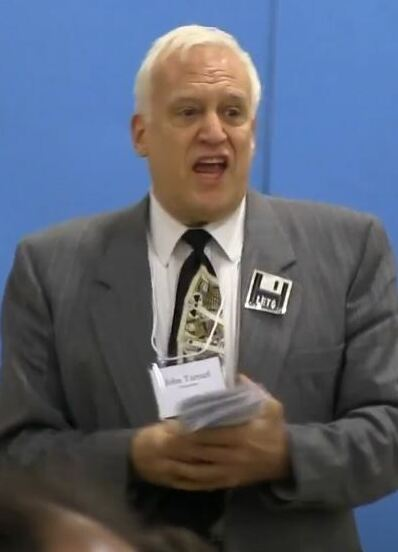
- Turmel in 2012

Leader of the Pauper Party
- In office September 14, 2011 – 2022
- President: Michael Spottiswood; Wayne Robinson
- Preceded by: Position created

Leader of the Abolitionist Party
- In office 1993–1996
- Preceded by: Position created
- Succeeded by: Position abolished

Leader of the Christian Credit Party
- In office 1982–1983
- Preceded by: Position created
- Succeeded by: Position abolished

Personal details
- Born: February 22, 1951 (age 75) Rouyn, Quebec, Canada
- Party: Independent (federal); Pauper (provincial)
- Other political affiliations: Abolitionist (1993–1996); Green (1984); Christian Credit (1982–1983); Social Credit (1980–1982)
- Occupation: Professional gambler
- Known for: Guinness World Records holder for most elections contested and most elections lost
- Website: www.johnturmel.com

John C. Turmel (born February 22, 1951) is a perennial candidate for election in Canada, and according to the Guinness World Records holds the records for the most elections contested and for the most elections lost, having contested 112 elections and lost 111. The other contest was a by-election that was pre-empted by a general election call.

== Background ==
Turmel, who describes himself as a "Libertarian Socred", believes in Louis Even's Quebec social credit theory of monetary reform and has also campaigned for the legalization of gambling, the adoption of time banking in the form of Local Employment Trading Systems (LETS) which are interest-free barter arrangements, and for the legalization of marijuana. He describes his platform as "I want no cops in gambling, sex or drugs or rock and roll, I want no usury on loans, pay cash or time, no dole."

He has participated in several protests outside of Canada's major banking institutions, saying that bank interest promotes poverty and starvation in the third world.

Turmel, an electrical engineering graduate, who lists his occupation as "professional gambler" was active in the Social Credit Party of Canada and the Social Credit Party of Ontario in the 1980s, and founded the Christian Credit Party in the 1980s, the Abolitionist Party of Canada in the 1990s, and the Pauper Party of Ontario in 2011. He wears a white construction helmet, when campaigning, and calls himself "The Engineer". The colour of his helmet is said to not only refer to the white construction helmets worn by engineers and architects on construction sites, but also to the berets blanc (white berets), the nickname of the Pilgrims of Saint Michael, a radical monetarist faction within the Quebec social credit movement.

Turmel's grandfather, Adelard Turmel, supported the Social Credit Party of Canada from its inception in 1935, and he passed on a belief in social credit monetary theories to his descendants. His brother, Raymond Turmel, has also campaigned for public office on several occasions.

Turmel spent most of his life in Ottawa but has made Brantford, Ontario, his home since 2003 after running in a by-election there and finding he liked the area where he could play high-stakes Holdem Poker professionally at the Brantford Charity Casino.

== Political activity ==
=== Entering the electoral fray ===
His campaign to legalize gambling and the notoriety he received as a result, combined with his family's background in social credit ideology, led Turmel to seek election at the federal level for the first time at the age of 28, as an independent candidate in Ottawa West in the May 1979 federal election in which he ran as the self-described "champion of hookers, gamblers and dope smokers" in a campaign in which he argued interest on money, usury, was the evil instability in financial affairs and swore to "abolish interest rates". He won 193 votes.

=== Social Credit ===
He ran again as an independent in the February 1980 federal election in Ottawa Centre. His application to run as a Social Credit Party of Canada candidate was rejected by party leader Fabien Roy. He won 64 votes. The Social Credit Party lost its remaining seats in the election.

Because of the death of the Social Credit candidate in Frontenac riding in Quebec during the election, a by-election was held in March. When Fabien Roy accepted the nomination without a convention, Turmel ran again as an independent against the Social Credit candidate. He ran as an independent candidate in the April 13 federal by-election in London West, claiming to be interim leader of the Ontario Social Credit Party. Turmel won 77 votes as an "independent Social Credit" candidate in a September 8 by-election in Hamilton West.

He also sought the Social Credit Party of Canada’s interim national leadership unsuccessfully at a convention in November in Calgary. Turmel opposed the appointment of Martin Hattersley as interim leader of the federal Social Credit party as being undemocratic. The party executive claimed that the party did not have sufficient funds to hold a convention.

While running in the Hamilton West federal byelection, Turmel registered for Mayor of Ottawa in November, collecting 1,928 votes. At the same time, he ran as the Social Credit candidate in a provincial by-election in Carleton riding, coming in last. Registered in a hat-trick.

With grandfather Adelard, mother Therese, and brother Ray Turmel in support, Turmel started picketing the Bank of Canada on every Thursday when the interest rate was set and then picketing Parliament too. This continued for five years until the retirement of Governor Gerald Bouey.

In the March 1981 provincial election, Turmel ran as a Social Credit candidate in Ottawa Centre, while his brother Raymond ran for the party in Ottawa South and Serge Girard, Dale Alkerton and Andrew Dynowski ran in neighbouring ridings. It was reported that he became interim leader of the Ontario Social Credit Party in early March, although it is not clear if other members of the party agreed.

In September, Turmel was a candidate in the federal by-election in Spadina riding in Toronto, collecting 98 votes. The national Social Credit party president Carl O’Malley refused to endorse a candidate on the basis that the Liberal candidate, Jim Coutts, a former adviser to Pierre Trudeau, was a personal friend. Raymond Turmel ran as an independent against O’Malley in the by-election held in Joliette, Quebec on the same day, claiming to be the "real Social Credit" candidate.

In October, the Ontario Social Credit Party conducted a leadership vote. The eleven delegates, who represented about 100 party members throughout the province, elected former Toronto mayoral candidate Anne McBride as their new interim leader in a vote of 7 to 1 with 3 spoiled ballots. One vote was cast for Bruce Arnold. Turmel, his brother Ray and their mother, Therese, wrote the word "unconstitutional" across the ballots. Turmel argued that the party was violating its constitution by holding a vote without providing four months' notice to its members. McBride was a Christian fundamentalist minister who vowed to run the party "on Christian principles".

In September, Turmel was reported to be fighting his expulsion from the federal Social Credit Party, and seeking its leadership. Further, he was reported to be seeking to replace Joe Clark as leader of the Progressive Conservative Party of Canada. Turmel denied the report, but the journalist stood by her story.

=== Christian Credit Party ===
In June 1982, Turmel returned to Hamilton West to run in a provincial by-election as a candidate of the Christian Credit Party that he had recently founded. He won 173 votes.

The Christian Credit Party was formed after the Social Credit Party refused to renew the memberships of Turmel and his brother Raymond. The Turmel brothers said that they left the party because it had compromised its principles on interest rates.

He also ran for the Christian Credit Party in the September federal by-election in Broadview—Greenwood (in Toronto), winning an all-time low 16 votes. Raymond ran for the party in Leeds—Grenville in eastern Ontario.

In July, Turmel attempted to recruit members for his new party at the Social Credit national convention in Regina. In September, the party claimed to have 75 members.

In November 1982, Turmel ran for alderman in the Ottawa suburb of Gloucester, and appears to have abandoned an attempt to run in a provincial by-election in Toronto-York South though list #13 shows it was not abandoned. His brother, Raymond, ran for mayor of Gloucester, while their colleague Marc Gauvin ran for mayor of Ottawa.

By 1983, the Christian Credit Party appears to have died. Turmel said he disbanded his party because he realized voters would not give it a chance. "People won't vote for a new party. They've been voting for one colour all their lives. The only way to do anything is to get into a recognized party."

Turmel, with Therese and Ray, Marc and Emi Gauvin and Serge Girard picketed the 1983 Bilderberger conference held at Chateau Montebello.

Turmel ran as an independent candidate in the Central Nova (Nova Scotia) riding by-election in September 1983 against Progressive Conservative leader Brian Mulroney. He claimed to be a "member of the Abolitionist wing of the PC party".

Turmel won 97 votes as a candidate in a provincial by-election in Stormont—Dundas—South Glengarry, Ontario.

=== Green Party ===
In the months before the 1984 federal election, Turmel attempted to take over the Ottawa branch of the fledgling Green Party of Canada by signing up new members and seeking the party’s nomination in Ottawa Centre. After the party had appointed a candidate in Ottawa Centre rather than hold nominations, Turmel claimed that it was undemocratic and called a meeting at which all Greens were invited to elect candidates to run in various Ottawa area ridings under the Green Party banner. The party rejected those nominations, and then held its own meeting to nominate new candidates.

In the election, Turmel ran as an independent against Green Party leader Trevor Hancock in Toronto—Beaches, Marc Gauvin ran in Ottawa Centre, supporter Serge Girard in Ottawa—Vanier, and John and Ray’s mother, Therese Turmel ran in Ottawa West, and Ray Turmel ran as an "independent Green" in Nepean—Carleton.

Turmel ran as an independent candidate in the December 13, 1984, provincial by-election in Ottawa Centre, and Serge Girard ran in Ottawa East. Turmel also ran for mayor of Ottawa.

In 1985, the Executive of the Ontario Branch of the Green Party expelled Ontario member John Turmel and Quebec member Ray Turmel.

=== Mid to late 1980s ===
Also in 1985, Turmel appears to have founded the "Social Credit Party of Ontario", which was not affiliated with other social credit parties. Turmel led a campaign against the practice of cheque cashing agencies that cashed social assistance (SA, or welfare) cheques at a discount to the face value. Turmel issued ID card to SA recipients and recruited local retailers to cash the cheques at no discount. The Social Credit Party of Ontario guaranteed these cheques. In November, Turmel supporter Walter McPhee ran for Ottawa mayor and Turmel for Nepean mayor. This proved to be Turmel's best performance by percentage of the vote, as he collected 7.25% of the vote, as he was the only other candidate against mayor Ben Franklin. Turmel ran in an April 1986 provincial by-election in Toronto-York East and an August 14 provincial by-election in Cochrane, Ontario, apparently under the "Social Credit Party of Ontario" banner.

In September, he ran as an "independent créditiste" claiming to be the heir of Réal Caouette in a federal by-election in St.-Maurice, Quebec when Liberal MP Jean Chrétien resigned.

In June 1987, Turmel ran in a federal by-election in Hamilton Mountain. He was reported to be "attempting to form" an Ontario Social Credit Party.

In the autumn of 1988, Turmel ran for mayor of Ottawa, Member of Parliament for Ottawa Centre and Member of Provincial Parliament for Welland—Thorold in the Niagara peninsula in a November 3 provincial by-election.

=== Abolitionist Party ===
Turmel founded the Abolitionist Party of Canada, which nominated 80 candidates in the 1993 federal election, one more than the Green Party of Canada.

In 1994, Turmel won over 4,500 votes running for chair of the Ottawa-Carleton Regional Municipality, the largest number of votes in his career.

He won 46 votes as the Abolitionist Party candidate in the February 13, 1995, Ottawa—Vanier federal by-election.

In June 1996, Turmel ran under the Abolitionist Party banner in a Hamilton East federal by-election and lost.

Turmel won 4,126 votes (2.5% of the total) running for chair of Ottawa-Carleton Regional Municipality in 1997, in which Bob Chiarelli defeated Peter Clark by 2,798 votes. Turmel won 214 votes as an independent candidate in Ottawa West—Nepean in the 1997 federal election. In September, Turmel won 201 votes as an independent candidate in Ottawa West in a provincial by-election.

Turmel ran for the board of the National Capital FreeNet after the previous board reduced the number of seats from 7 to 5. He came 6th, and argues he was cheated out of the only election he ever won.

Turmel appeared in the 1997 Guinness Book of World Records for most elections contested.

He ran as an "independent Abolitionist" in a September 14, 1998, federal by-election in Sherbrooke, Quebec.

In 1999, he won 106 votes as an Abolitionist Party candidate in a March federal by-election in Windsor—St. Clair, Ontario, which was more than the margin by which Liberal candidate Rick Limoges defeated Joe Comartin of the New Democratic Party.

=== Early 2000s ===
In 2000, Turmel ran as an independent candidate in the September Kings—Hants (Nova Scotia) federal by-election against Progressive Conservative leader Joe Clark. He won 89 votes as an independent candidate in Ottawa West—Nepean in the November federal election.

In the same year, he made a presentation to the United Nations on the interest-free UNILETS resulting in Millennium Declaration Resolution C6 to governments to use an alternative time-based currency to restructure the global financial architecture.

In 2002, Turmel attempted to run for the leadership of the Marijuana Party but the leadership election was called off after Turmel showed up to contest the election.

Turmel won 295 votes as an independent candidate in Brant riding in the 2003 October provincial election. His 56th campaign was for Mayor of Ottawa in the November 2003 municipal election, when he collected 1,166 votes.

He also tried to resurrect the Libertarian Party of Canada, but was prevented from doing so when former members re-registered the name first.

Turmel ran as an independent candidate and placed fifth with 120 votes in a May 13, 2004, provincial by-election in Hamilton East. He placed last of eight candidates as an independent candidate in the March 17, 2005, provincial by-election in Dufferin—Peel—Wellington—Grey and placed last in Brant riding with 213 votes in the 2006 federal election.

Turmel was convicted of drug possession in March 2006, resulting from a one-man protest on Parliament Hill in Ottawa three years earlier. Turmel had taken three kilograms of marijuana to the hill, and openly smoked a joint in front of politicians and security officials. He announced plans to appeal. The conviction was rendered on the same day as a provincial by-election in Nepean—Carleton, in which Turmel was a candidate.

In 2003, Turmel acted as a party to Hitzig v Canada, a civil suit instrumental in reforming the Marihuana Medical Access Regulations and the status of medical cannabis in Canada generally.

Turmel ran as an independent candidate in a 2008 by-election in the riding of Guelph. On Monday, August 25, he disrupted a televised debate involving candidates from the four major political parties to which the other four candidates had not been invited to participate. He yelled out his objections so loudly that the moderator of the debate could not be heard. He was eventually removed from the venue, the River Run Centre, by the Guelph police. The by-election was pre-empted by a federal election call in which Turmel re-filed his candidacy for the same riding – he came in tenth out of eleven candidates receiving 58 votes.

On September 10, 2009, police were called after Turmel lost control and disrupted an all-candidates meeting during the provincial by-election in Ontario's St. Paul's riding. Angry at a moderator's rule which forced residents to direct their questions at four of eight candidates, thus effectively limiting his opportunity to speak, Turmel lashed out and ran around the church hall shouting at debate panelists and audience members that he'd go back onstage when he could answer too. At one point, the debate had to pause as a group of attendees attempted a citizen's arrest. Turmel stated that he would "ruin everyone's night" because "mine was ruined".

=== Dragon's Den ===
On January 13, 2010, Turmel appeared on the CBC television show Dragons' Den pitching his Local exchange trading system scheme, asking the panel of entrepreneurs to invest $100,000 for a program which would use poker chips from a local casino as currency at local businesses in Brantford, Ontario. The "dragons" said they didn’t understand Turmel's presentation and mocked him. Kevin O'Leary told Turmel he should "burst into flames" and fellow dragon Jim Treliving told Turmel he was "blowing air up a dead horse's ass". Turmel initiated a lawsuit against the CBC as a result of the program. His complaint was rejected by the Ontario Court of Appeal in July 2011. On December 8, 2011, the Supreme Court of Canada denied Turmel's subsequent request for leave to appeal. He continues to maintain that the show was a "smear job".

=== 2011 federal election ===
After contesting every Canadian general election from 1979 to 2008, Turmel did not contest the 2011 federal election. He indicated, however, that he would be willing to serve as prime minister if offered the role by Canada's elected parliamentarians, as per William Aberhart's rise to the premiership of Alberta in 1935 if the Engineer's Dream Team of chosen other party candidates were elected.

=== Pauper Party ===
Turmel contested the 2011 Ontario provincial election as founder and leader of the newly formed Pauper Party of Ontario. stating "we want no cops in gambling, sex or drugs or rock and roll, we want no usury on loans, pay cash or time, no dole." Turmel has subsequently run in Ontario by-elections under the "Pauper" banner.

=== Recent elections until 2024 ===
In 2012, Turmel again ran as an independent, this time in the March 19 federal by-election in Toronto—Danforth to choose a successor to Jack Layton. He ran on a campaign pushing for mass production of marijuana to fight cancers he says are coming from the "nuclear fallout that hit us from Fukushima".

On the provincial level, Turmel has continued to carry the banner of the Pauper Party of Ontario and ran in the August 1, 2013 by-election in Ottawa South to choose the successor to Dalton McGuinty placing last with 43 votes. He ran again as a Pauper candidate in the February 13, 2014 provincial by-election in Thornhill placing last with 49 votes. On September 1, 2016, he secured second-to-last place in the Scarborough—Rouge River provincial by-election by one vote over former Trillium Party candidate Ania Krosinska.

Turmel placed sixth out of six candidates in the 2020 York Centre federal by-election, earning just under 0.6% of the vote.

In 2023, he was a candidate in the Hamilton Centre provincial by-election, the Oxford federal by-election, the Scarborough—Guildwood provincial by-election, and the Kitchener Centre provincial by-election.

In 2024, he contested the Milton provincial by-election, the LaSalle—Émard—Verdun federal by-election, and the Bay of Quinte provincial by-election.

=== Health and missed elections since 2024 ===
During the 2024 Milton provincial by-election, Turmel said that he expected to miss an all-candidates debate because of a hospital visit for cancer treatment.

Since then, Turmel has not run in the 2025 Ontario general election, the 2025 Canadian federal election, the December 2024 Cloverdale—Langley City federal by-election, the August 2025 Battle River—Crowfoot federal by-election, or the federal by-elections held in 2026.

== Vexatious litigation ==
According to the Attorney General of Canada, Turmel is a "perennial litigant" and has filed at least 67 court proceedings since 1980. In 2022, Canada's Federal Court labelled Turmel a "vexatious litigant", which prevents him from introducing a new application to the Court unless he had a court order to allow it.

== Appearance before Parliament ==
On June 6, 2018, Turmel appeared as a witness before the Canadian House of Commons Standing Committee on Procedure and House Affairs regarding the Trudeau Government's proposed changes to the Canada Elections Act. During his appearance Turmel argued for free and equal broadcasting time for all candidates and fair auditing rules for candidates with only minor campaign expenses. He also discussed the time banking software "LETS", being arrested, and being invited to give speeches at the United Nations.

== Election results ==
#	Date	Level	Location	Party	Votes	%	Ref.
1	May 22, 1979	Federal	Ottawa West	Independent	193	0.35	
2	February 18, 1980	Federal	Ottawa Centre	Independent	62	0.13	
3	March 24, 1980	Federal by-election	Frontenac	Independent	101	0.31	
4	September 8, 1980	Federal by-election	Hamilton West	Independent	88	0.28	
5	November 10, 1980	Municipal/Mayor	Ottawa	N/A	1,928	2.21	
6	November 20, 1980	Provincial by-election	Carleton	Social Credit	95	0.39	
7	March 19, 1981	Provincial	Ottawa Centre	Social Credit	376	1.48	
8	April 12, 1981	Federal by-election	London West	Independent	37	0.08	
9	May 4, 1981	Federal by-election	Lévis	Independent	172	0.51	
10	August 17, 1981	Federal by-election	Spadina	Independent	69	0.31	
11	June 17, 1982	Provincial by-election	Hamilton West	Christian Credit Party	173	0.75	
12	October 12, 1982	Federal by-election	Broadview—Greenwood	Christian Credit Party	19	0.07	
13	November 4, 1982	Provincial by-election	York South	Independent	66	0.27	
14	November 8, 1982	Municipal/Alderman	Gloucester	N/A	1,193	1.27	
15	August 29, 1983	Federal by-election	Central Nova	Independent	46	0.15	
16	December 15, 1983	Provincial by-election	Stormont—Dundas—South Glengarry	Independent	97	0.46	
17	September 4, 1984	Federal	Beaches	Independent	112	0.31	
18	December 13, 1984	Provincial by-election	Ottawa Centre	Independent	90	0.46	
19	May 2, 1985	Provincial	Ottawa Centre	Independent	364	1.33	
20	November 12, 1985	Municipal/Mayor	Nepean	N/A	1,405	7.25	
21	April 17, 1986	Provincial by-election	York East	Social Credit Party of Ontario	44	0.17	
22	August 14, 1986	Provincial by-election	Cochrane North	Social Credit Party of Ontario	75	0.74	
23	September 29, 1986	Federal by-election	Saint-Maurice	Independent creditiste	104	0.31	
24	July 20, 1987	Federal by-election	Hamilton Mountain	Independent	166	0.50	
25	September 10, 1987	Provincial	Ottawa Centre	Independent	598	2.03	
26	March 31, 1988	Provincial by-election	London North	Independent	115	0.35	
27	November 3, 1988	Provincial by-election	Welland—Thorold	Independent	187	0.65	
28	November 14, 1988	Municipal/Mayor	Ottawa	N/A	3,123	3.88	
29	November 21, 1988	Federal	Ottawa Centre	Independent	152	0.31	
30	August 13, 1990	Federal by-election	Oshawa	Independent	50	0.20	
31	September 6, 1990	Provincial	Ottawa Centre	Independent	160	0.53	
32	December 10, 1990	Federal by-election	York North	Independent	97	0.23	
33	November 12, 1991	Municipal/Regional Chair	Regional Municipality of Ottawa-Carleton	N/A	3,570	1.81	
34	October 23, 1993	Federal	Frontenac	Abolitionist	210	0.63	
35	December 2, 1993	Provincial by-election	Essex South	Independent	84	0.46	
36	March 17, 1994	Provincial by-election	Victoria—Haliburton	Independent	123	0.52	
37	November 14, 1994	Municipal/Regional Chair	Regional Municipality of Ottawa-Carleton	N/A	4,563	2.35	
38	February 13, 1995	Federal by-election	Ottawa—Vanier	Abolitionist Party	46	0.23	
39	June 8, 1995	Provincial	Ottawa Centre	Independent	173	0.61	
40	March 25, 1996	Federal by-election	Etobicoke North	Abolitionist Party	75	0.28	
41	June 17, 1996	Federal by-election	Hamilton East	Abolitionist Party	21	0.08	
42	June 2, 1997	Federal	Ottawa West—Nepean	Independent	211	0.39	
43	September 4, 1997	Provincial by-election	Ottawa West	Independent	201	0.93	
44	November 10, 1997	Municipal/Regional Chair	Regional Municipality of Ottawa-Carleton	N/A	4,129	2.49	
45	September 14, 1998	Federal by-election	Sherbrooke	Independent Abolitionist	97	0.27	
46	April 12, 1999	Federal by-election	Windsor—St. Clair	Abolitionist Party	106	0.33	
47	June 3, 1999	Provincial	Ottawa West—Nepean	Independent	94	0.20	
48	November 15, 1999	Federal by-election	Hull—Aylmer	Independent	51	0.29	
49	September 7, 2000	Provincial by-election	Ancaster—Dundas—Flamborough—Aldershot	Independent	80	0.24	
50	September 11, 2000	Federal by-election	Kings—Hants	Independent	221	0.81	
51	November 13, 2000	Municipal/Mayor	Ottawa	N/A	677	0.27	
52	November 27, 2000	Federal	Ottawa West—Nepean	Independent	89	0.17	
53	March 22, 2001	Provincial by-election	Parry Sound—Muskoka	Independent	61	0.23	
54	May 2, 2002	Provincial by-election	Dufferin—Peel—Wellington—Grey	Independent	120	0.37	
55	October 2, 2003	Provincial	Brant	Independent	295	0.66	
56	November 10, 2003	Municipal/Mayor	Ottawa	N/A	1,166	0.63	
57	May 13, 2004	Provincial by-election	Hamilton East	Independent Abolitionist	120	0.50	
58	June 28, 2004	Federal	Brant	Independent	373	0.70	
59	March 17, 2005	Provincial by-election	Dufferin—Peel—Wellington—Grey	Independent Abolitionist	85	0.31	
60	January 23, 2006	Federal	Brant	Independent	213	0.40	
61	March 30, 2006	Provincial by-election	Nepean—Carleton	Independent	112	0.37	
62	September 14, 2006	Provincial by-election	Parkdale—High Park	Independent	77	0.27	
63	November 13, 2006	Municipal/Mayor	Brantford	N/A	226	0.84	
64	February 8, 2007	Provincial by-election	Burlington	Independent	90	0.40	
65	September 17, 2007	Federal by-election	Outremont	Independent	30	0.13	
66	October 10, 2007	Provincial	Brant	Independent	272	0.57	
67*	September 8, 2008	Federal by-election	Guelph	Independent	N/A	N/A	
68	October 14, 2008	Federal	Guelph	Independent	58	0.10	
69	March 5, 2009	Provincial by-election	Haliburton—Kawartha Lakes—Brock	Independent	92	0.26	
70	September 17, 2009	Provincial by-election	St. Paul's	Independent	51	0.19	
71	November 9, 2009	Federal by-election	Hochelaga	Independent	69	0.40	
72	February 4, 2010	Provincial by-election	Toronto Centre	Independent	67	0.25	
73	March 4, 2010	Provincial by-election	Ottawa West—Nepean	Independent	230	0.81	
74	October 25, 2010	Municipal/Mayor	Brantford	N/A	61	0.22	
75	October 6, 2011	Provincial	Brant	Pauper Party	87	0.20	
76	March 19, 2012	Federal by-election	Toronto—Danforth	Independent	57	0.20	
77	September 6, 2012	Provincial by-election	Kitchener—Waterloo	Independent	23	0.05	
78	August 1, 2013	Provincial by-election	Ottawa South	Pauper Party	64	0.20	
79	November 25, 2013	Federal by-election	Toronto Centre	Independent	56	0.22	
80	February 13, 2014	Provincial by-election	Thornhill	Pauper Party	49	0.18	
81	June 12, 2014	Provincial	Brant	Pauper Party	61	0.12	
82	June 30, 2014	Federal by-election	Trinity—Spadina	Independent	141	0.41	
83	October 27, 2014	Municipal/Mayor	Brantford	N/A	133	0.55	
84	November 17, 2014	Federal by-election	Whitby—Oshawa	Independent	101	0.30	
85	February 5, 2015	Provincial by-election	Sudbury	Pauper Party	118	0.46	
86	September 3, 2015	Provincial by-election	Simcoe North	Pauper Party	46	0.12	
87	October 19, 2015	Federal	Brantford—Brant	Independent	164	0.26	
88	February 11, 2016	Provincial by-election	Whitby—Oshawa	Pauper Party	11	0.03	
89	September 1, 2016	Provincial by-election	Scarborough—Rouge River	Pauper Party	37	0.15	
90	November 17, 2016	Provincial by-election	Ottawa—Vanier	Pauper Party	51	0.17	
91	April 3, 2017	Federal by-election	Ottawa—Vanier	Independent	147	0.50	
92	June 1, 2017	Provincial by-election	Sault Ste. Marie	Pauper Party	47	0.18	
93	December 11, 2017	Federal by-election	Scarborough—Agincourt	Independent	145	0.80	
94	June 7, 2018	Provincial	Brantford—Brant	Pauper Party	59	0.10	
95	June 18, 2018	Federal by-election	Chicoutimi—Le Fjord	Independent	98	0.41	
96	October 22, 2018	Municipal/Mayor	Brantford	N/A	128	0.53	
97	December 3, 2018	Federal by-election	Leeds—Grenville—Thousand Islands and Rideau Lakes	Independent	111	0.38	
98	February 25, 2019	Federal by-election	York—Simcoe	Independent	64	0.40	
99	October 21, 2019	Federal	Brantford—Brant	Independent	146	0.22	
100	February 27, 2020	Provincial by-election	Orléans	Pauper Party	32	0.12	
101	October 26, 2020	Federal by-election	York Centre	Independent	104	0.58	
102	September 20, 2021	Federal	Brantford—Brant	Independent	138	0.21	
103	June 2, 2022	Provincial	Brantford—Brant	Independent	157	0.33	
104	October 24, 2022	Municipal/Mayor	Brantford	N/A	343	1.71	
105	December 12, 2022	Federal by-election	Mississauga—Lakeshore	Independent	14	0.06	
106	March 16, 2023	Provincial by-election	Hamilton Centre	Independent	37	0.21	
107	June 19, 2023	Federal by-election	Oxford	Independent	171	0.44	
108	July 27, 2023	Provincial by-election	Scarborough—Guildwood	Independent	20	0.13	
109	November 30, 2023	Provincial by-election	Kitchener Centre	Independent	13	0.06	
110	May 2, 2024	Provincial by-election	Milton	Independent	64	0.23	
111	September 16, 2024	Federal by-election	LaSalle—Émard—Verdun	Independent	16	0.05	
112	September 19, 2024	Provincial by-election	Bay of Quinte	Independent	149	0.4	
