= Party whip (Canada) =

Political party caucus disciplinary position

In Canada, a party whip is the member of a political party in the House of Commons of Canada, the Senate of Canada or a provincial legislative assembly charged with ensuring party discipline among members of that party's caucus. The whip is also responsible for assigning offices and scheduling speakers from their party for various bills, motions and other proceedings in the legislature.

== Responsibilities ==
A party whip works to ensure that the number of party members in the legislature or at committee meetings is adequate to win a vote if one is called. When a vote is called in the legislature, division bells ring until the whips for each party are satisfied that there are sufficient members of their own party present for the vote to proceed.

The whip's role is especially important when there is a minority government or if the government has a slim majority, as the absence of a handful of members during a confidence vote could result in the defeat of the government. Party discipline is strict in Canada, and party members are expected to vote with the rest of their party in all but a few designated free votes.

The chief opposition whip is tasked with ensuring that their fellow members of the Official Opposition caucus maintain party discipline. This includes the responsibilities of distributing vote sheets to caucus members that identify the party's position on each bill or motion, and ensuring the attendance of their party members in sittings of the House of Commons and in parliamentary committees.

== Use in Canadian government ==
James E. Walker, chief government whip from 1963 to 1966, commented: "Once you get beyond the taxicab radius of Ottawa, nobody seems to have heard of a Whip. For that matter, nobody in Ottawa, three blocks from the Hill, has ever heard of the Whip either!"

The post of chief government whip is not always cabinet-level position. However, the chief government whip may receive a concurrent appointment, such as minister without portfolio or Minister of State, and sit in cabinet by virtue of that position. The position briefly held cabinet rank at the start of the 30th Canadian Ministry, though the post was dropped from cabinet following the 2025 Canadian federal election.

For a time, the Reform Party of Canada publicly styled its parliamentary whip with the title of Caucus Coordinator rather than Whip.

== Current Whips ==
=== Senate ===
- Government Liaison in the Senate: Iris Petten
- Opposition Whip in the Senate: Judith Seidman

=== House of Commons ===
- Chief Government Whip: Mark Gerretsen
- Deputy Government Whip: Élisabeth Brière
- Chief Opposition Whip: Chris Warkentin
- Deputy Chief Opposition Whip: Rob Moore
- Bloc Québécois Whip: Yves Perron
- NDP Whip: N/A

== List of chief whips in the House of Commons ==
=== Chief government whips ===
Chief Government Whip
- Whip en chef du gouvernement
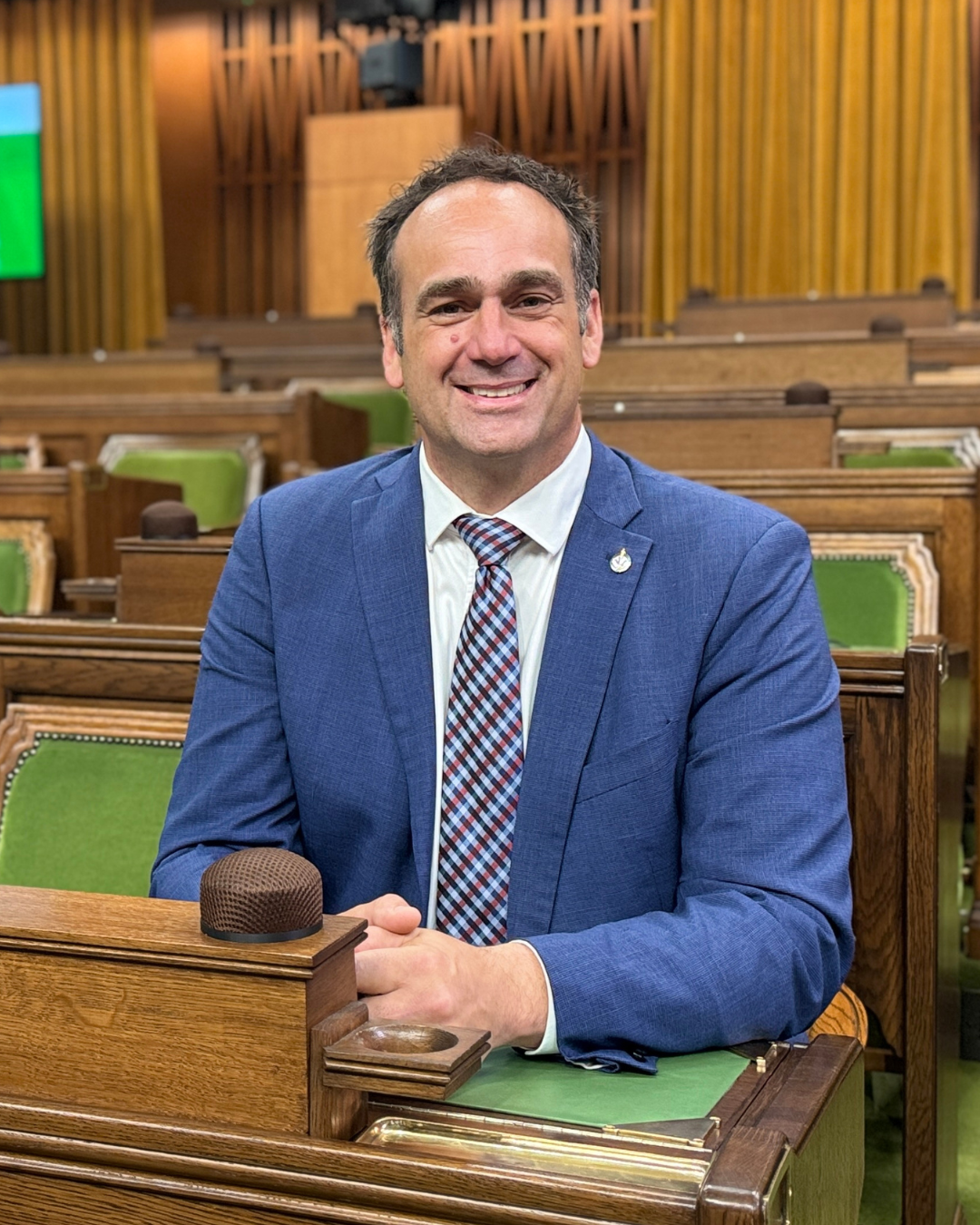
- Incumbent; Mark Gerretsen since May 14, 2025
- Member of: House of Commons; Government caucus
- Appointer: Prime minister
- Inaugural holder: Thomas Mayne Daly
- Formation: 1872
- Salary: $37,100

The chief government whip maintains party discipline within the government caucus of the House of Commons.

Whip	Party	Tenure	Prime minister Government
Thomas Mayne Daly	Conservative	1872–1873	Sir John A. Macdonald; 1st Ministry
George Elliott Casey	Liberal	1874–1878	Alexander Mackenzie; 2nd Ministry
Rufus Stephenson	Conservative	1878–1882	Sir John A. Macdonald; 3rd Ministry
Arthur Trefusis Heneage Williams	Conservative	1882–1885	Sir John A. Macdonald; 3rd Ministry
Paul-Étienne Grandbois	Conservative	1885–1891	Sir John A. Macdonald; 3rd Ministry
George Taylor	Conservative	1891–1892	Sir John Abbott; 4th Ministry
George Taylor	Conservative	1892–1894	Sir John Sparrow David Thompson; 5th Ministry
George Taylor	Conservative	1894–1896	Sir Mackenzie Bowell; 6th Ministry
George Taylor	Conservative	1896	Sir Charles Tupper; 7th Ministry
James Sutherland	Liberal	1896–1900	Sir Wilfrid Laurier; 8th Ministry
William Samuel Calvert	Liberal	1901–1909	Sir Wilfrid Laurier; 8th Ministry
Frederick Forsyth Pardee	Liberal	1909–1911	Sir Wilfrid Laurier; 8th Ministry
John Stanfield	Conservative	1911–1917	Sir Robert Borden; 9th Ministry/10th Ministry
William Sora Middlebro	Conservative	1918–1920	Sir Robert Borden; 9th Ministry/10th Ministry
William Sora Middlebro	Conservative	1920–1921	Arthur Meighen; 11th Ministry
George William Kyte	Liberal	1921–1925	William Lyon Mackenzie King; 12th Ministry
Pierre-François Casgrain	Liberal	1926	William Lyon Mackenzie King; 12th Ministry
William Alves Boys	Conservative	1926	Arthur Meighen; 13th Ministry
Pierre-François Casgrain	Liberal	1926–1930	William Lyon Mackenzie King; 14th Ministry
Thomas Edward Simpson	Conservative	1930–1935	R. B. Bennett; 15th Ministry
Ross Gray	Liberal	1937–1940	William Lyon Mackenzie King; 16th Ministry
William Horace Taylor	Liberal	1940–1945	William Lyon Mackenzie King; 16th Ministry
William Gilbert Weir	Liberal	1945–1948	William Lyon Mackenzie King; 16th Ministry
William Gilbert Weir	Liberal	1948–1957	Louis St. Laurent; 17th Ministry
Elston Cardiff	Progressive Conservative	1957–1958	John Diefenbaker; 18th Ministry
John Pallett	Progressive Conservative	1959–1962	John Diefenbaker; 18th Ministry
Théogène Ricard	Progressive Conservative	1962–1963	John Diefenbaker; 18th Ministry
Alexis Caron	Liberal	1963	Lester B. Pearson; 19th Ministry
James Edgar Walker	Liberal	1963–1965	Lester B. Pearson; 19th Ministry
Bernard Pilon	Liberal	1966–1968	Lester B. Pearson; 19th Ministry
Bernard Pilon	Liberal	1968–1970	Pierre Trudeau; 20th Ministry
Lloyd Francis	Liberal	1970-1971	Pierre Trudeau; 20th Ministry
Grant Deachman	Liberal	1971–1972	Pierre Trudeau; 20th Ministry
Thomas Lefebvre	Liberal	1972–1975	Pierre Trudeau; 20th Ministry
Joseph-Philippe Guay	Liberal	1975–1977	Pierre Trudeau; 20th Ministry
Gus MacFarlane	Liberal	1977–1979	Pierre Trudeau; 20th Ministry
Bill Kempling	Progressive Conservative	1979–1980	Joe Clark; 21st Ministry
Charles Turner	Liberal	1980–1984	Pierre Trudeau; 22nd Ministry
Chuck Cook	Progressive Conservative	1984–1985	Brian Mulroney; 24th Ministry
Thomas Fennell	Progressive Conservative	1985–1988	Brian Mulroney; 24th Ministry
Jim Hawkes	Progressive Conservative	1988–1993	Brian Mulroney; 24th Ministry
Jim Edwards	Progressive Conservative	1993	Kim Campbell; 25th Ministry
Alfonso Gagliano	Liberal	1993–1994	Jean Chrétien; 26th Ministry
Don Boudria	Liberal	1994–1996	Jean Chrétien; 26th Ministry
Bob Kilger	Liberal	1996–2001	Jean Chrétien; 26th Ministry
Marlene Catterall	Liberal	2001–2003	Jean Chrétien; 26th Ministry
Mauril Bélanger	Liberal	2003–2004	Paul Martin; 27th Ministry
Karen Redman	Liberal	2004–2006	Paul Martin; 27th Ministry
Jay Hill	Conservative	2006–2008	Stephen Harper; 28th Ministry
Gordon O'Connor	Conservative	2008–2013	Stephen Harper; 28th Ministry
John Duncan	Conservative	2013–2015	Stephen Harper; 28th Ministry
Andrew Leslie	Liberal	2015–2017	Justin Trudeau; 29th Ministry
Pablo Rodríguez	Liberal	2017–2018	Justin Trudeau; 29th Ministry
Mark Holland	Liberal	2018–2021	Justin Trudeau; 29th Ministry
Steven MacKinnon	Liberal	October 28, 2021 – January 7, 2024	Justin Trudeau; 29th Ministry
Ruby Sahota	Liberal	January 8, 2024 – December 20, 2024	Justin Trudeau; 29th Ministry
Mona Fortier	Liberal	December 21, 2024 – March 13, 2025	Justin Trudeau; 29th Ministry
Rechie Valdez	Liberal	March 14, 2025 – May 13, 2025	Mark Carney; 30th Ministry
Mark Gerretsen	Liberal	May 14, 2025 – present	Mark Carney; 30th Ministry

=== Chief opposition whips ===
Chief Opposition Whip
- whip en chef de l'opposition
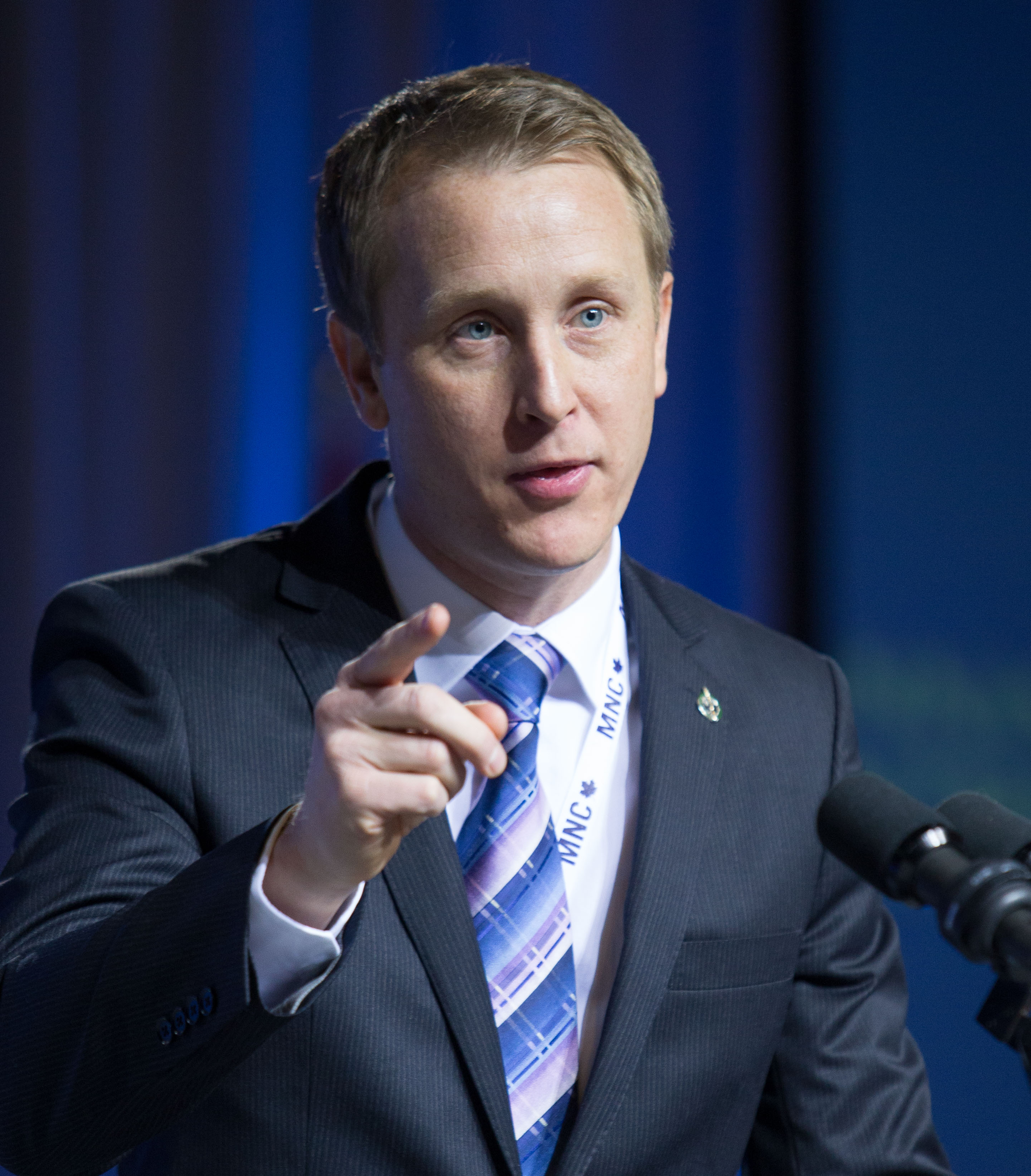
- Incumbent; Chris Warkentin since May 7, 2025
- Member of: House of Commons; Official Opposition caucus
- Appointer: Leader of the party forming the Official Opposition (Note: Normally the leader of the Opposition)
- Inaugural holder: George Taylor
- Formation: 1901
- Salary: $37,100

The chief opposition whip (French: Whip en chef de l'Opposition) is the party whip from the Official Opposition caucus in the House of Commons of Canada. They are appointed by the leader of the Official Opposition party, who is typically also the leader of the Opposition unless the party leader does not have a seat in the House. The current chief opposition whip is Chris Warkentin of the Conservative Party of Canada.

Whip	Party	Tenure	Riding
George Taylor	Conservative	1901 – November 3, 1904	Leeds South
George Taylor	Conservative	November 3, 1904 – 1907	Leeds
Frederick Forsyth Pardee	Conservative	1912 – 1912	Lambton West
James Robb	Liberal	1919 – 1919	Châteauguay—Huntingdon
Samuel Charters	Conservative	1927 – 1935	Peel
Arza Casselman	Conservative	1936 – December 10, 1942	Grenville—Dundas
Arza Casselman	Progressive Conservative	December 10, 1942 – 1955	Grenville—Dundas
George Tustin	Progressive Conservative	March 1956 – April 1957	Prince Edward—Lennox
Pierre Gauthier	Liberal	November 1957 – April 1958	Portneuf
Joseph-Anaclet Habel	Liberal	April 21, 1958 – 1963	Cochrane
Eric Alfred Winkler	Progressive Conservative	April 1963 – March 30, 1967	Grey—Bruce
Reynold Rapp	Progressive Conservative	April 1, 1967 – 1968	Humboldt—Melfort—Tisdale
Thomas Miller Bell	Progressive Conservative	July 6, 1968 – September 20, 1973	Saint John—Lancaster
Robert McKinley	Progressive Conservative	September 21, 1973 – July 5, 1974	Huron—Bruce
Robert McKinley	Progressive Conservative	July 5, 1974 – 1975	Huron-Middlesex
Steve Paproski	Progressive Conservative	February 1976 – 1978	Edmonton Centre
Thomas Lefebvre	Liberal	October 9, 1979 – December 14, 1979	Pontiac—Gatineau—Labelle
Bill Kempling	Progressive Conservative	1980 – 1983	Burlington
Chuck Cook	Progressive Conservative	September 7, 1983 – September 17, 1984	North Vancouver—Burnaby
Jean-Robert Gauthier	Liberal	September 17, 1984 – 1990	Ottawa—Vanier
David Charles Dingwall	Liberal	October 1990 – January 30, 1991	Cape Breton—East Richmond
Alfonso Gagliano	Liberal	January 31, 1991 – September 8, 1993	Saint-Léonard—Saint-Michel
Gilles Duceppe	Bloc Québécois	October 26, 1993 – February 21, 1996	Laurier—Sainte-Marie
Madeleine Dalphond-Guiral	Bloc Québécois	February 22, 1996 – June 2, 1997	Laval Centre
Chuck Strahl	Reform	June 2, 1997 – January 30, 2000	Fraser Valley
Jay Hill	Reform	January 31, 2000 – March 26, 2000	Prince George—Peace River
Jay Hill	Canadian Alliance	March 26, 2000 – July 31, 2000	Prince George—Peace River
John Reynolds	Canadian Alliance	August 1, 2000 – April 24, 2001	West Vancouver—Sunshine Coast
Richard Harris	Canadian Alliance	April 25, 2001 – January 13, 2002	Prince George—Bulkley Valley
Garry Breitkreuz	Canadian Alliance	December 18, 2001 – April 3, 2002	Yorkton—Melville
Dale Johnston	Canadian Alliance	April 4, 2002 – December 7, 2003	Wetaskiwin
Dale Johnston	Conservative	December 7, 2003 – July 21, 2004	Wetaskiwin
Jay Hill	Conservative	July 22, 2004 – January 27, 2005	Prince George—Peace River
Rob Nicholson	Conservative	January 28, 2005 – February 5, 2006	Niagara Falls
Karen Redman	Liberal	February 10, 2006 – November 2, 2008	Kitchener Centre
Rodger Cuzner	Liberal	November 3, 2008 – September 6, 2010	Cape Breton—Canso
Marcel Proulx	Liberal	September 7, 2010 – May 2, 2011	Hull—Aylmer
Yvon Godin	New Democratic	May 2, 2011 – May 25, 2011	Acadie—Bathurst
Chris Charlton	New Democratic	May 26, 2011 – April 18, 2012	Hamilton Mountain
Nycole Turmel	New Democratic	April 19, 2012 – October 22, 2015	Hull—Aylmer
Dave MacKenzie	Conservative	October 23, 2015 – November 9, 2015	Oxford
Gord Brown	Conservative	November 10, 2015 – July 19, 2017	Leeds—Grenville—Thousand Islands and Rideau Lakes
Mark Strahl	Conservative	July 20, 2017 – September 1, 2020	Chilliwack—Hope
Blake Richards	Conservative	September 2, 2020 –February 3, 2022	Banff—Airdrie
Blaine Calkins	Conservative	February 4, 2022 – September 13, 2022	Red Deer—Lacombe
Kerry-Lynne Findlay	Conservative	September 14, 2022 – April 27, 2025	South Surrey—White Rock
Chris Warkentin	Conservative	May 7, 2025 – present	Grande Prairie

== See also ==
- Chief Whip
- Party whip (Australia)
- Elbowgate, a 2016 incident involving the chief opposition whip
