= 2018 Leeds—Grenville—Thousand Islands and Rideau Lakes federal by-election =

- December 3, 2018

Riding of Leeds—Grenville—Thousand Islands and Rideau Lakes
- Turnout: 35.89% (▼35.18pp)
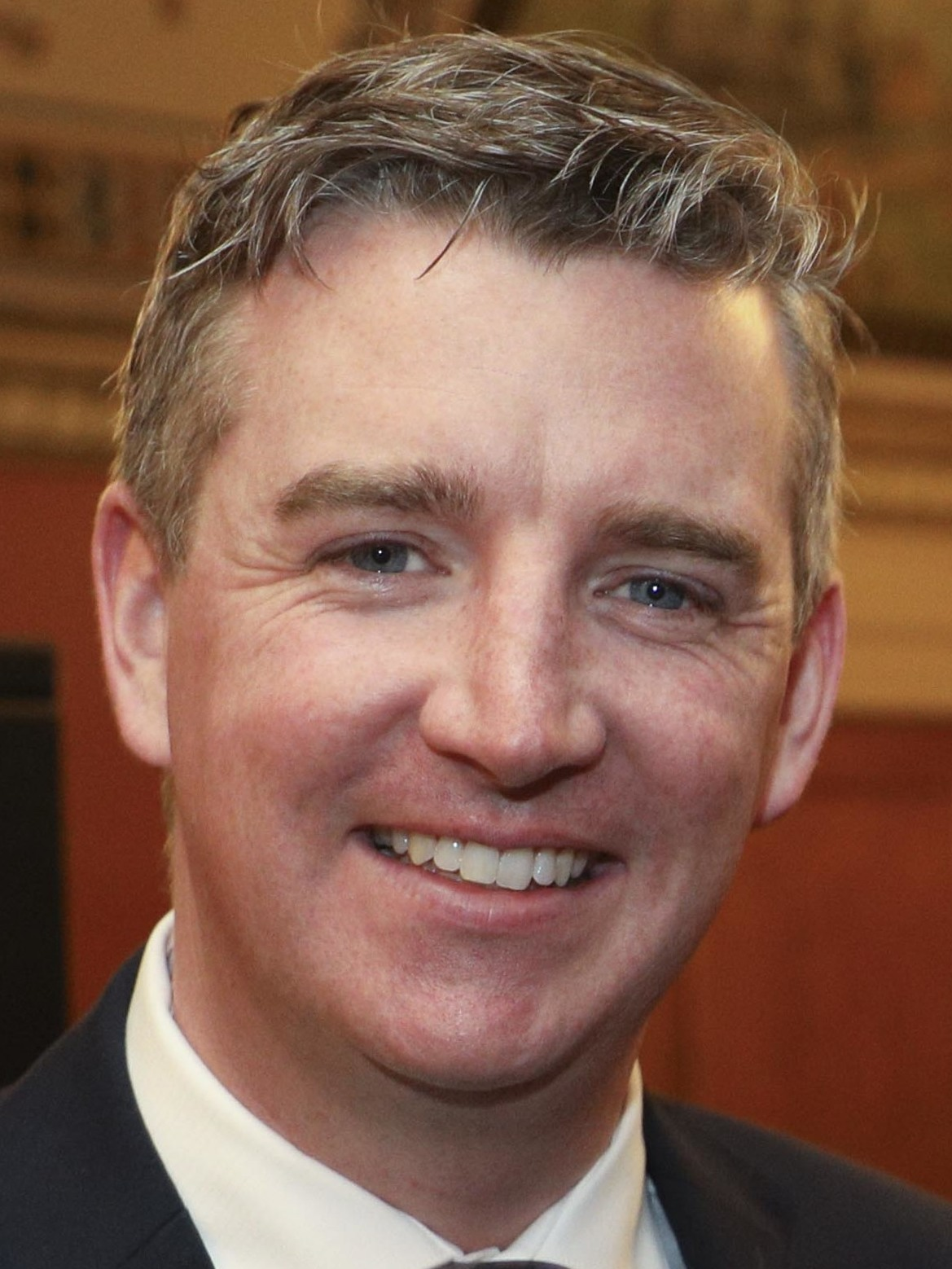

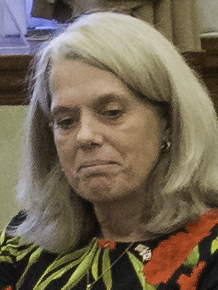
	First party	Second party
Candidate	Michael Barrett	Mary Jean McFall
Party	Conservative	Liberal
Popular vote	16,865	10,443
Percentage	57.83%	35.81%
Swing	▲10.46pp	▼4.74pp
MP before election
Gord Brown
Conservative
Elected MP
Michael Barrett
Conservative

A by-election was held in the federal riding of Leeds—Grenville—Thousand Islands and Rideau Lakes in Ontario on December 3, 2018, following the sudden death of incumbent Conservative MP Gord Brown on May 2, 2018.

The seat was retained for the Conservatives by riding association president Michael Barrett.

== Background ==
=== Constituency ===
Leeds—Grenville—Thousand Islands and Rideau Lakes is a rural riding in Eastern Ontario. It consists of the entirety of the United Counties of Leeds and Grenville.

=== Representation ===
The riding was created in 1976. The MP since 2004 was Gord Brown who gained the seat from Liberal MP Joe Jordan at the 2004 federal election. Brown was re-elected in 2006, 2008, 2011 and 2015. The seat became vacant when Brown died of a sudden heart attack in his Parliament Hill office in Ottawa.

== Campaign ==
Colin Brown, Brown's nephew, announced his candidacy for the Conservative nomination and was quickly endorsed by Premier of Ontario Doug Ford. In addition, Edwardsburgh/Cardinal town councillor and federal riding association president Michael Barrett, government-relations specialist Stephanie Mitton, and Anne Johnston, a former aide to Leeds—Grenville—Thousand Islands and Rideau Lakes MPP Steve Clark also ran for the Conservative nomination. Former Canadian Senator and interim Leader of the Opposition in the Ontario Legislature Bob Runciman was rumoured to be interested in seeking the Conservative nomination for the by-election but decided against it after his wife encountered some health issues. Barrett won the nomination at a local party convention at the Brockville Memorial Centre on August 11 in a contest that ran to a fourth ballot.

2015 Liberal candidate Mary Jean McFall – a lawyer, former Brockville city councillor and immediate former Chief of Staff to Agriculture Minister Lawrence MacAulay – won the Liberal nomination for this by-election unopposed.

Michelle Taylor was the NDP candidate; Taylor ran for the Ontario NDP in Leeds—Grenville—Thousand Islands and Rideau Lakes in the 2018 provincial election.

Lorraine Rekmans, the Green candidate for this riding in 2015, ran again for the party.

The Speaker's warrant regarding the vacancy was received on May 3, 2018; under the Parliament of Canada Act the writ for a by-election had to be dropped no later than October 30, 2018, 180 days after the Chief Electoral Officer was officially notified of the vacancy via a warrant issued by the Speaker. On October 28, 2018, the writ was dropped for a by-election for December 3, 2018.

== Result ==
Canadian federal by-election, December 3, 2018: Leeds—Grenville—Thousand Islands and Rideau Lakes (federal electoral district) Death of Gord Brown
Party	Candidate	Votes	%	±%	Expenditures
Conservative	Michael Barrett	16,865	57.83	+10.46	
Liberal	Mary Jean McFall	10,443	35.81	-4.74	
New Democratic	Michelle Taylor	883	3.03	-5.34	
Green	Lorraine Rekmans	859	2.95	-0.75	
Independent	John Turmel	111	0.38		
Total valid votes/Expense limit		29,161	100.00		
Total rejected ballots					
Turnout			35.89	-35.18	
Eligible voters		81,247			
Conservative hold		Swing		+7.60	

== 2015 result ==
2015 Canadian federal election
Party	Candidate	Votes	%	±%	Expenditures
Conservative	Gord Brown	26,738	47.38	-13.43	$118,628.90
Liberal	Mary Jean McFall	22,888	40.56	+24.66	$98,777.41
New Democratic	Margaret Andrade	4,722	8.37	-9.95	$5,647.96
Green	Lorraine A. Rekmans	2,088	3.70	-1.29	$6,935.40
Total valid votes/Expense limit		56,436	100.00		$213,643.31
Total rejected ballots		189	0.33	–	
Turnout		56,625	71.08	–	
Eligible voters		79,669			
Conservative hold		Swing		-19.04	
Source: Elections Canada
