= Cossitt =

Cossitt is a surname. Notable people with the surname include:

- Franceway Ranna Cossitt (1790–1863), American Presbyterian minister
- Jennifer Cossitt (born 1948), Canadian politician, wife of Thomas
- Thomas Cossitt (1927–1982), Canadian politician
