= John Mathieson =

John Mathieson may refer to:

- John Mathieson (surveyor) (1855–1945), Scottish explorer and surveyor
- John Alexander Mathieson (1863–1947), Premier of the Canadian province of Prince Edward Island, 1911–1917
- John Mathieson (computer scientist), computer scientist
- John Mathieson (cinematographer) (born 1958), British cinematographer
- John Mathieson (minister), Church of Scotland minister

== See also ==
- John Matheson (born 1917), Canadian politician
- John Mathison (1901–1982), New Zealand politician
