= By-elections to the 32nd Canadian Parliament =

By-elections to the 32nd Canadian Parliament were held to fill vacancies in the House of Commons of Canada between the 1980 federal election and the 1984 federal election. The Liberal Party of Canada led a majority government for the entirety of the 32nd Canadian Parliament, though their number did decrease from by-elections.

27 seats became vacant during the life of the Parliament. 12 of these vacancies were filled through by-elections, and 15 seats remained vacant when the 1984 federal election was called.

By-election	Date	Incumbent	Party	Winner	Party	Cause	Retained
Mission—Port Moody	August 29, 1983	Mark Rose	New Democratic	Gerry St. Germain	Progressive Conservative	Resignation	No
Central Nova	August 29, 1983	Elmer M. MacKay	Progressive Conservative	Brian Mulroney	Progressive Conservative	Resignation to provide a seat for Mulroney	Yes
Brandon—Souris	May 24, 1983	Walter Dinsdale	Progressive Conservative	Lee Clark	Progressive Conservative	Death (kidney failure)	Yes
Broadview—Greenwood	October 12, 1982	Bob Rae	New Democratic	Lynn McDonald	New Democratic	Resigned to become leader of New Democratic Party of Ontario	Yes
Leeds—Grenville	October 12, 1982	Tom Cossitt	Progressive Conservative	Jennifer Cossitt	Progressive Conservative	Death (heart attack)	Yes
Timiskaming	October 12, 1982	Bruce Lonsdale	Liberal	John A. MacDougall	Progressive Conservative	Death (car accident)	No
Spadina	August 17, 1981	Peter Stollery	Liberal	Dan Heap	New Democratic	Called to the Senate	No
Joliette	August 17, 1981	Roch La Salle	Progressive Conservative	Roch La Salle	Progressive Conservative	Resignation to contest the 1981 Quebec election	Yes
Lévis	May 4, 1981	Raynald Guay	Liberal	Gaston Gourde	Liberal	Resignation	Yes
London West	April 13, 1981	Judd Buchanan	Liberal	Jack Burghardt	Liberal	Resignation	Yes
Cardigan	April 13, 1981	Daniel J. MacDonald	Liberal	W. Bennett Campbell	Liberal	Death	Yes
Hamilton West	September 8, 1980	Lincoln Alexander	Progressive Conservative	Stan Hudecki	Liberal	Resignation	No

== See also ==
- List of federal by-elections in Canada

== Sources ==
- Parliament of Canada–Elected in By-Elections
