= Michael Barrett (Canadian politician) =

Canadian politician

Michael Barrett MP
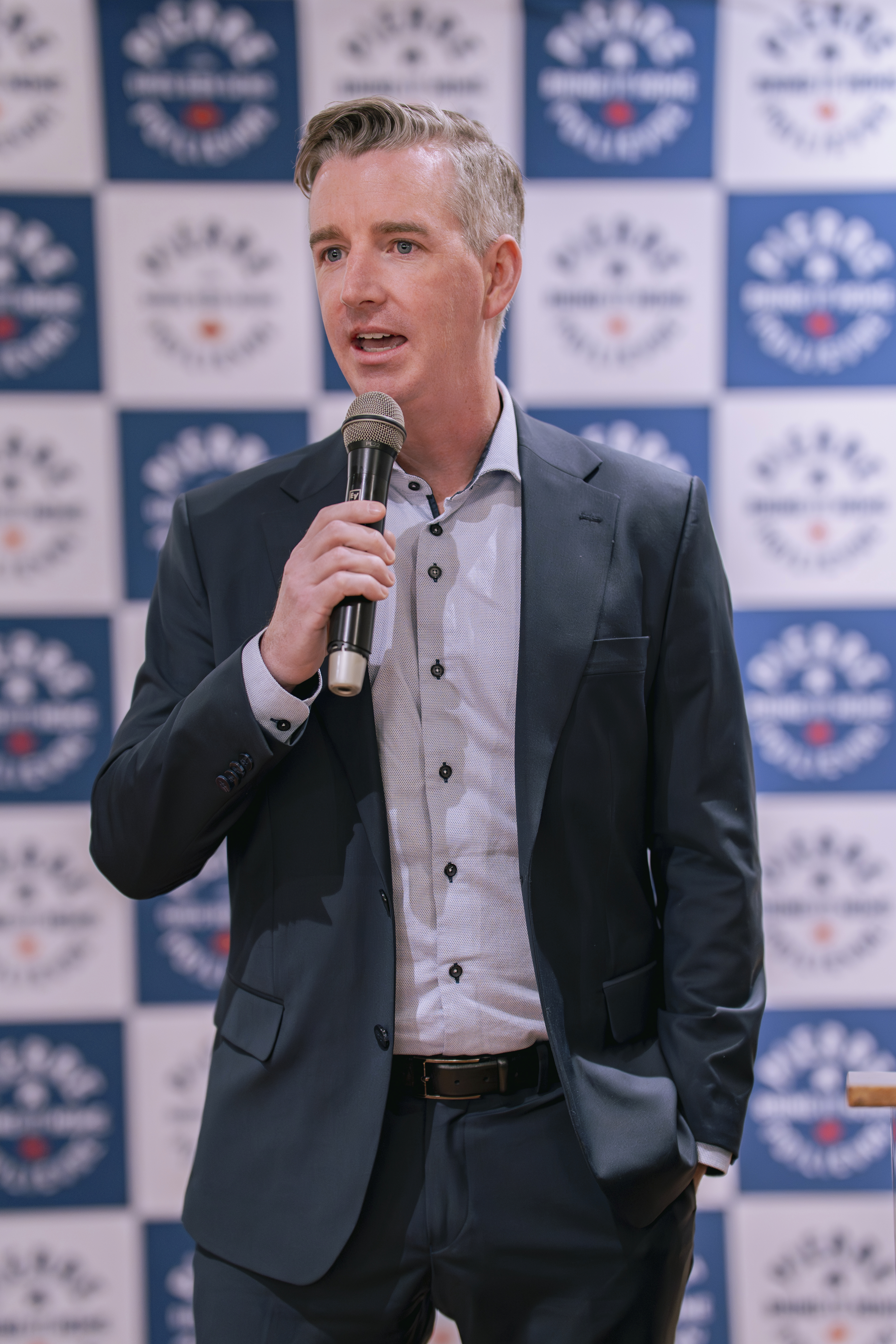
- Barrett in 2024

Member of Parliament for Leeds—Grenville—Thousand Islands—Rideau Lakes
- Incumbent
- Assumed office December 3, 2018

Shadow Minister for Ethics and Accountable Government
- In office September 13, 2022 – June 30, 2026
- Leader: Pierre Poilievre

Shadow Minister for Veteran Affairs
- Incumbent
- Assumed office June 30, 2026
- Leader: Pierre Poilievre

Personal details
- Born: 1984 (age 41–42) Scarborough, Ontario, Canada
- Party: Conservative

Michael Barrett MP (born 1984) is a Canadian politician, who was first elected to the House of Commons of Canada in a by-election on December 3, 2018. He represents the electoral district of Leeds—Grenville—Thousand Islands—Rideau Lakes as a member of the Conservative Party of Canada. He won the riding again in the October 2019 federal election, was re-elected in the September 2021 federal election, and again in the April 28, 2025 federal election.

== Biography ==
Barrett was born in Scarborough, Ontario in 1984, graduated from Algonquin College in Ottawa, and enrolled in the Canadian Armed Forces, serving in the Regular Force as a telecommunications lineman and attaining the rank of corporal. Following his service in the army, he worked as a human resources manager. He has five children. Before his election to Parliament, he served as an elected councillor in Edwardsburgh/Cardinal for four years. Barrett was first elected to the House of Commons in the 2018 federal by-election for Leeds—Grenville—Thousand Islands and Rideau Lakes. He was subsequently re-elected in 2019, 2021 and 2025.

In November 2019, Barrett was appointed Shadow Minister for Ethics. In November 2021, Barrett was appointed Deputy Opposition House Leader and a Co-Chair of Question Period Planning.

During a shadow cabinet shuffle in February 2022, Opposition Leader Candice Bergen named Barrett Shadow Minister for Health, which saw him elected Vice-Chair of the Standing Committee on Health. Following the election of Pierre Poilievre as leader of the Conservative Party, Barrett was appointed Shadow Minister for Ethics and Accountable Government. Barrett was named one of Brockville’s 40 Under 40 in 2022. During a July 2026 shadow cabinet shuffle, Barrett was appointed Shadow Minister for Veterans Affairs.

At the time of the 2025 Canadian federal election, he lived in Brockville, Ontario.

=== Committees ===
Barrett has served on several House of Commons committees. He has been a member of the Standing Committee on Access to Information, Privacy and Ethics, including its Subcommittee on Agenda and Procedure. He has also served on the Standing Committees on Justice and Human Rights, Government Operations and Estimates, and Procedure and House Affairs. In the 44th Parliament, he served as Vice-Chair of the Standing Committee on Health and the Special Joint Committee on Medical Assistance in Dying.

=== Parliamentary oversight and accountability work ===
Barrett has participated in several parliamentary investigations related to ethics and government accountability. During the 2019 SNC-Lavalin affair, he questioned then Minister of Justice and Attorney General David Lametti before the Standing Committee on Justice and Human Rights. He later questioned former Attorney General Jody Wilson-Raybould during her appearance before the committee.

In July 2020, Barrett questioned Prime Minister Justin Trudeau during committee hearings related to the WE Charity controversy.

Barrett later played a prominent role in parliamentary scrutiny of the ArriveCAN procurement program. In 2024, a GCStrategies co-founder was summoned to the Bar of the House of Commons and formally admonished in connection with the ArriveCAN study.

In the 44th Parliament, Barrett sponsored Private Member's Bill C-405, An Act to amend the Criminal Code and the Parliament of Canada Act, which proposed amendments establishing mandatory penalties for perjury before Parliament and authorizing Parliament to impose financial penalties for contempt. The bill did not progress past the first reading.

In the 45th Parliament, Barrett introduced Private Member's Bill C-282, the Service Dogs for Veterans Act, which would amend the Veterans Well-being Act to recognize service dogs as an eligible rehabilitation support for veterans and establish a national framework respecting standards for the breeding, training, certification and placement of service dogs.

== Electoral record ==
2025 Canadian federal election: Leeds—Grenville—Thousand Islands—Rideau Lakes
Party	Candidate	Votes	%	±%	Expenditures
Conservative	Michael Barrett	33,437	50.05	–0.48	
Liberal	Lorna Jean Edmonds	29,656	44.39	+19.19	
New Democratic	Paul Lancione	2,341	3.50	–11.45	
Green	Randi Ramdeen	781	1.17	–2.43	
People's	Hailey Simpson	596	0.89	–4.83	
Total valid votes		66,811	99.47		
Total rejected ballots		356	0.53	-0.11	
Turnout		67,167	73.78	+5.60	
Eligible voters		91,042			
Conservative hold		Swing		–9.84	
Source: Elections Canada

2021 Canadian federal election
Party	Candidate	Votes	%	±%
Conservative	Michael Barrett	29,950	50.5	+1.5
Liberal	Roberta L. Abbott	14,935	25.2	-1.3
New Democratic	Michelle Taylor	8,863	15.0	+1.0
People's	Alex Cassell	3,394	5.7	+4.0
Green	Lorraine Rekmans	2,134	3.6	-5.2
Total valid votes		59,276		
Total rejected ballots		380		
Turnout		59,656	68.48	
Eligible voters		87,118		
Source: Elections Canada

2019 Canadian federal election: Leeds—Grenville—Thousand Islands and Rideau Lakes
Party	Candidate	Votes	%	±%	Expenditures
Conservative	Michael Barrett	28,630	48.98	-8.85	$52,413.10
Liberal	Josh Bennett	15,482	26.49	-9.32	$48,972.84
New Democratic	Michelle Taylor	8,201	14.03	+11	$4,315.07
Green	Lorraine Rekmans	5,152	8.81	+5.86	none listed
People's	Evan Hindle	988	1.69		none listed
Total valid votes/expense limit		58,453	100.0		
Total rejected ballots		479			
Turnout		58,932	69.8		
Eligible voters		84,442			
Conservative hold		Swing		+0.24	
Source: Elections Canada

Canadian federal by-election, December 3, 2018: Leeds—Grenville—Thousand Islands and Rideau Lakes Death of Gord Brown
Party	Candidate	Votes	%	±%	Expenditures
Conservative	Michael Barrett	16,865	57.8	+10.4	
Liberal	Mary Jean McFall	10,443	35.8	-4.8	
New Democratic	Michelle Taylor	883	3.0	-5.4	
Green	Lorraine Rekmans	859	2.9	-0.8	
Independent	John "The Engineer" Turmel	111	0.4	+0.4	
Total valid votes/Expense limit		29,169	100.00		
Total rejected ballots					
Turnout			35.89%		
Eligible voters					
Conservative hold		Swing		+7.6	
