= George Taylor (Canadian politician) =

Canadian politician

The Honourable George Taylor
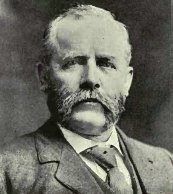

Chief Government Whip
- In office 1891–1896
- Prime Minister: John Abbott; John Sparrow David Thompson; Mackenzie Bowell; Charles Tupper
- Preceded by: Paul-Étienne Grandbois
- Succeeded by: James Sutherland

Chief Opposition Whip
- In office 1901–1907
- Preceded by: Inaugural holder
- Succeeded by: Frederick Forsyth Pardee

Senator from Ontario
- In office November 14, 1911 – March 26, 1919
- Nominated by: Robert Borden
- Appointed by: The Duke of Connaught

Member of Parliament for Leeds Leeds South (1882–1904)
- In office June 20, 1882 – October 25, 1911
- Preceded by: David Ford Jones
- Succeeded by: William Thomas White

Personal details
- Born: March 31, 1840 Lansdowne, Upper Canada
- Died: March 26, 1919 (aged 78)
- Party: Conservative

George Taylor (March 31, 1840 – March 26, 1919) was a Canadian politician.

== Background ==
Born in Lansdowne, Leeds County, Upper Canada, he was first elected to the House of Commons of Canada for the electoral district of Leeds South in the 1882 federal election. A Conservative, he would be re-elected 7 more times until being summoned to the Senate of Canada representing the senatorial division of Leeds, Ontario in 1911. He would sit in the Senate until his death in 1919 after having served in parliament for 37 years.

From 1891 to 1896, he was the Chief Government Whip and from 1901 to 1907 the Chief Opposition Whip.

== Electoral record ==
1882 Canadian federal election: Leeds South
Party	Candidate	Votes	%
Conservative	George Taylor	1,993	53.73
Unknown	C.E. Britton	1,716	46.27

1887 Canadian federal election: Leeds South
Party	Candidate	Votes	%
Conservative	George Taylor	2,456	54.63
Liberal	C.E. Britton	2,040	45.37

1891 Canadian federal election: Leeds South
Party	Candidate	Votes	%
Conservative	George Taylor	2,294	51.18
Liberal	J.B. Turner	2,188	48.82

1896 Canadian federal election: Leeds South
Party	Candidate	Votes	%
Conservative	George Taylor	2,501	52.36
Liberal	William H. Fredenburgh	2,013	42.14
Patrons of Industry	James H. Horton	263	5.51

1900 Canadian federal election: Leeds South
Party	Candidate	Votes	%
Conservative	George Taylor	2,472	54.52
Liberal	William A. Lewis	2,062	45.48
