= Hugh Alexander Stewart =

Canadian politician

The Honourable Hugh Alexander Stewart
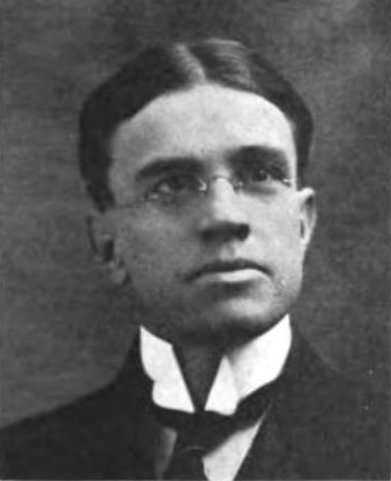

Member of the Canadian Parliament for Leeds
- In office December 6, 1921 – March 25, 1940
- Preceded by: William Thomas White
- Succeeded by: George Taylor Fulford

Personal details
- Born: September 29, 1871 Elizabethtown Township, Ontario, Canada
- Died: September 4, 1956 (aged 84)
- Party: Conservative
- Cabinet: Minister of Public Works (1930–1935)

Hugh Alexander Stewart, PC (September 29, 1871 – September 4, 1956) was a Canadian politician.

Born in Elizabethtown Township, Ontario, he was elected to the House of Commons of Canada representing the Ontario riding of Leeds in the 1921 federal election. A Conservative, he was re-elected in 1925, 1926, 1930, and 1935. He was defeated in 1940. From 1930 to 1935, he was the Minister of Public Works.
