= Hayden Stanton =

Canadian politician

Member of Parliament for Leeds
- In office August 1953 – December 1960
- Preceded by: George Fulford
- Succeeded by: John Matheson

Personal details
- Born: 13 September 1898 Crosley, Ontario, Canada
- Died: 7 December 1960 (aged 62) Kingston, Ontario, Canada
- Party: Progressive Conservative
- Profession: farmer

Hayden Stanton (13 September 1898 – 7 December 1960) was a Progressive Conservative party member of the House of Commons of Canada. He was born in South Crosby Twp. and became a dairy farmer by career.

He was first elected at the Leeds riding in the 1953 general election and re-elected for successive terms in the 1957 and 1958 elections.

Stanton died in Kingston, Ontario on 7 December 1960 where he was in hospital following stomach surgery, during his term in the 24th Canadian Parliament. John Matheson of the Liberal party succeeded him at Leeds in a May 1961 by-election.
