= William Thomas White =

Canadian politician (1866–1955)

The Right Honourable Sir William Thomas White PC GCMG
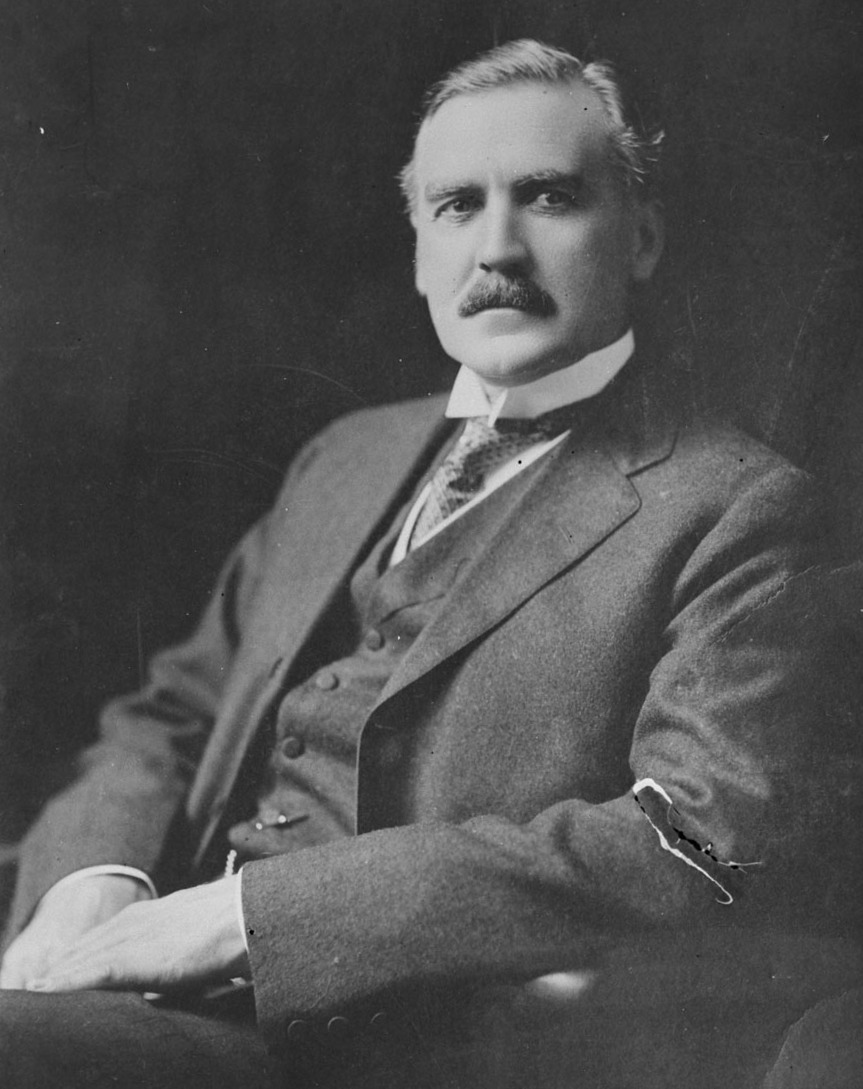
- White, c. 1910s

Minister of Finance and Receiver General
- In office 10 October 1911 – 1 August 1919
- Prime Minister: Robert Borden
- Preceded by: William Stevens Fielding
- Succeeded by: Henry Lumley Drayton

Member of Parliament for Leeds
- In office 6 November 1911 – 6 April 1921
- Preceded by: George Taylor
- Succeeded by: Hugh Alexander Stewart

Personal details
- Born: 13 November 1866 Bronte (Oakville), Canada West
- Died: 11 February 1955 (aged 88) Toronto, Ontario, Canada
- Party: Conservative
- Spouse: Annie Isabel Silverthorne (m. 1890; died 1948)
- Education: University of Toronto (BA); Osgoode Hall Law School (LLB)
- Occupation: Financier; journalist; lawyer

Sir William Thomas White PC GCMG (13 November 1866 – 11 February 1955), was a Canadian politician and Cabinet minister. He served as minister of finance from 1911 to 1919 under Prime Minister Robert Borden. As finance minister, White introduced the income tax to help fund Canada's World War I efforts.

== Early life ==
White worked as a reporter for the Toronto Evening Telegram in 1890, and subsequently worked for Toronto's Assessment Department. He received a Bachelor of Arts degree from the University of Toronto in 1895, and a law degree from Osgoode Law School in 1899.

White did not practice law after his graduation, but instead worked as a managing director for the National Trust Company, Ltd., becoming its vice-president in 1911. National Trust was incorporated in 1898 by Senator George Albertus Cox and Edward Rogers Wood. National Trust Company, Ltd. became part of Bank of Nova Scotia as Scotia Trust in 1997.

== Political career and finance minister ==
White was initially a Liberal party member, but his views diverged from the party's policies on some key matters. He was a supporter of British imperialism, and joined Clifford Sifton and other Liberals in signing an anti - reciprocity manifesto in 1911.

Although he had few allies in the Conservative Party, White was respected by party leader Robert Borden, who recognized that White's presence would bring some disaffected Liberals to the party. After winning the general election of 1911, Borden appointed White as his Minister of Finance. White did not hold a seat in the House of Commons of Canada at the time, and in fact had never campaigned for public office before. Nevertheless, he was elected by acclamation in a by-election in the eastern Ontario riding of Leeds, after another Conservative Member of Parliament (MP) was convinced to resign.

White was responsible for managing Canada's finances during World War I. His approach was conservative, and he was reluctant to interfere with private enterprise or even to raise taxes in the early period of the war. Although he eventually made some interventions (including fixed profit margins and regulated food supplies), he continued to reject fundamental changes in the nation's finances. One exception was the introduction in 1917 of an income tax of 4% on all income of single men over $2,000; for Canadians with annual incomes of more than $6,000, the tax rate ranged from 2 to 25 per cent. Though it was intended as a temporary war measure and despite White's recommendation that "a year or two after the war is over, the measure should be reviewed by the minister of finance of the day, with a view of judging whether it is suitable to the conditions which then prevail," income tax became a permanent feature of Canadian life.

In the 1916 New Year Honours, White was knighted a Knight Commander of the Order of St Michael and St George (KCMG).

In 1919, he approved the use of naval warships to suppress post-war labour radicalism in British Columbia. White served as finance minister until August 1, 1919. From February 20 to May 23 of 1919, he also served as acting prime minister while Borden was in Europe attending the Paris Peace Conference. Several members of Borden's Unionist government (a wartime coalition of the Conservative Party and some Liberals) called on White to replace Borden as prime minister in 1920, but he declined.

In the 1920 New Year Honours, as a reward for his service as acting prime minister, White was appointed to the Imperial Privy Council, allowing him to use the honorific "The Right Honourable". He remained a member of parliament until the 1921 election when he retired from politics. Later in the year, he published a pamphlet entitled The Story of Canada's War Finances, defending his management of the wartime economy.

== Later life ==
White did not consider himself as a "career politician". His tenure as finance minister was very stressful, and he seems to have welcomed the opportunity to leave political life after the war's end. There is no indication that he entertained a return to politics in later years.

In 1933, he served as a member of the Royal Commission on Banking and Currency. He opposed the creation of the Bank of Canada.

In the King's 1935 Birthday Honours, he was promoted within the Order of St Michael and St George to a Knight Grand Cross (GCMG) "For public services in the Dominion of Canada."

== Archives ==
There is a Sir William Thomas White fonds at Library and Archives Canada.
