= Jim Jordan (Canadian politician) =

Canadian politician (1928–2012)

Member of Parliament for Leeds—Grenville
- In office 1988–1997
- Preceded by: Jennifer Cossitt
- Succeeded by: Joe Jordan

Personal details
- Born: 2 September 1928 Marlbank, Ontario, Canada
- Died: 18 September 2012 (aged 84) Brockville, Ontario, Canada
- Party: Liberal
- Spouse(s): Mary Barrett m. 29 August 1953

Jim Jordan (2 September 1928 – 18 September 2012) was a member of the House of Commons of Canada from 1988 to 1997. His career had been in education as a teacher and administrator.

== Biography ==
Jordan was born the youngest of seven children to George and Hannah Jordan (née Taylor) in Marlbank, Ontario. His father, George, was a longtime municipal politician in Hungerford Township and ran unsuccessfully in the riding of East Hastings for the Liberals in the 1948 provincial election.

He was educated in Marlbank, Tweed and at Regiopolis in Kingston, and attended teacher's college in 1949 following completion of Grade 13. He married Mary Barrett in 1953. He began his teaching career at CFB Petawawa, eventually rising to the position of principal after eight years. He then accepted a position of school inspector in the Lanark, Leeds and Grenville area. In 1969 he became the first director of education for the Lanark, Leeds and Grenville School Board. He retired from the education field in 1985, and subsequently began to pursue a career in politics.

Jordan was an Ontario Liberal Party candidate in the 1987 provincial election, losing by fewer than 200 votes to Progressive Conservative incumbent Bob Runciman.

He then chose to contest the 1988 federal election, defeating incumbent MP Jennifer Cossitt by over 2,000 votes. He was re-elected in the 1993 election, and retired in 1997. His son Joe Jordan secured the Liberal nomination in Leeds and Grenville that year, and succeeded his father as MP in the 1997 election. This marked the first time in Canadian history that a son had directly succeeded his father as MP for the same constituency.

He died from cancer on 18 September 2012 at the Brockville and District Hospice Palliative Care facility. Jordan died exactly 4 years to the day after his wife

== Family ==
Jim Jordan is the father of seven boys: Dr. David Jordan, Bob Jordan, Paul Jordan, Joe Jordan, Tom Jordan, Mike Jordan, and Dr. Andy Jordan. Jordan is the grandfather of 17 grandchildren, four great granddaughters and three great grandsons.

== Additional information ==
Jordan campaigned for federal funding to support the construction of the Highway 416 superhighway between Ottawa and Highway 401.
