= Albert Norton Richards =

Canadian politician

The Honourable Albert Norton Richards QC
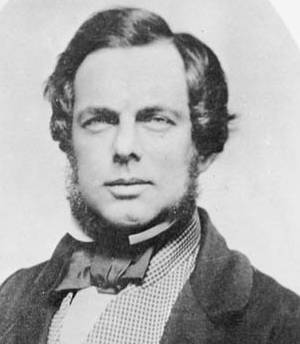
- Albert Norton Richards; Source: Library and Archives Canada

2nd Lieutenant Governor of British Columbia
- In office June 27, 1876 – June 21, 1881
- Monarch: Victoria
- Governors General: The Earl of Dufferin; Marquess of Lorne
- Premier: Andrew Charles Elliott; George Anthony Walkem
- Preceded by: Joseph Trutch
- Succeeded by: Clement Francis Cornwall

Personal details
- Born: December 8, 1821 Brockville, Ontario, Canada
- Died: March 6, 1897 (aged 75) Victoria, British Columbia, Canada
- Party: Liberal
- Spouses: Frances Chaffey (m. 1849) Ellen Chaffey Chislett (m. 1854)
- Occupation: lawyer
- Profession: Politician

Albert Norton Richards, QC (December 8, 1821 – March 6, 1897) was a Canadian lawyer and political figure. He represented Leeds South in the House of Commons of Canada as a Liberal member from 1872 to 1874. He served as the second Lieutenant Governor of British Columbia from 1876 to 1881.

He was born in Brockville in Upper Canada in 1821, the son of Stephen Richards and Phoebe Buell. He studied law with his brother William Buell Richards and was called to the bar in 1848. Richards practised law in Brockville and in Victoria, British Columbia. He was one of the founders of what is now the Vancouver-based law firm of Richards Buell Sutton.

In 1863, he was appointed Queen's Counsel. He was elected to the 8th Parliament of the Province of Canada in 1863, but was defeated in 1864 when he accepted the post of Solicitor General for Canada West and so was required to run again for the same seat. In 1867, he was narrowly defeated by John Willoughby Crawford in Leeds South but was elected in 1872. In 1869, he was named Attorney General in the provisional government of the Northwest but was turned back by the rebels at Pembina. In 1874, he moved to British Columbia. On June 27, 1876, he was sworn in as Lieutenant Governor there. After his term in this office, he returned to Ontario for three years, then went back to Victoria where he practised law, dying in Victoria in 1897. Richards served as Treasurer (chief elected officer) of the Law Society of British Columbia from 1889 to 1892 and from 1894 to 1897.

Richards was married twice: to Frances Chaffey in 1849 and to Ellen Chaffey Chislett in 1854. The painter Frances Richards (1852–1934) was his daughter from his first marriage.

Richards Street in Vancouver is named after him.

1867 Canadian federal election: Leeds South
| Party | Candidate | Votes | % |
|---|---|---|---|
| Conservative | John Willoughby Crawford | 1,393 | 50.53 |
| Liberal | Albert Norton Richards | 1,364 | 49.47 |

1872 Canadian federal election: Leeds South
| Party | Candidate | Votes | % |
|---|---|---|---|
| Liberal | Albert Norton Richards | 1,270 | 50.24 |
| Unknown | George Morton | 1,258 | 49.76 |

Parliament of Canada
| Preceded by John Crawford | Member of Parliament from Leeds South; 1872-1874 | Succeeded by David Ford Jones |
