= George Fulford =

Canadian businessman and politician

Ontario MPP for Leeds
- In office 1934–1937

Member of Parliament for Leeds
- In office March 1940 – June 1945
- Preceded by: Hugh Alexander Stewart
- Succeeded by: George Robert Webb
- In office June 1949 – August 1953
- Preceded by: George Robert Webb
- Succeeded by: Hayden Stanton

Personal details
- Born: George Taylor Fulford; 6 May 1902 Brockville, Ontario, Canada
- Died: 15 December 1987 (aged 85) Brockville, Ontario, Canada
- Party: Liberal
- Spouse(s): 1) Josephine C. Weller m. 30 September 1926; 2) Judy m. ?-1987, his death
- Parent: George Taylor Fulford (father)
- Occupation: Businessman

George Taylor Fulford (6 May 1902 – 15 December 1987) was a Canadian businessman and politician who was a Liberal party member of the House of Commons of Canada. Fulford was born in Brockville, Ontario, and he became an executive and manufacturer, particularly as president of the medicine manufacturer G. T. Fulford Co.

== Life and career ==
Fulford graduated from the University of Toronto. He also attended Harvard University.

In 1934, Fulford was elected as a Liberal to the Ontario legislature for the Leeds riding, under Mitchell Hepburn's government. After leaving provincial politics due to his defeat in 1937, Fulford was elected to the House of Commons for the Leeds riding in the 1940 federal election. He was defeated in the 1945 federal election by George Robert Webb of the Progressive Conservative party.

Fulford returned to parliament by winning the riding in the 1949 federal election over a new Progressive Conservative candidate, John Lionel Carroll. After that term, Fulford was defeated by the Progressive Conservative party's Hayden Stanton in 1953. Fulford was unsuccessful in unseating Stanton in the 1957 and 1958 elections.

Fulford switched his support to the Progressive Conservative party in 1970, following a dispute over federal Liberal language policies. He died at a hospital in Brockville in 1987, at the age of 85.
