= George Webb (politician) =

Canadian politician (1886–1958)

Member of Parliament for Leeds
- In office June 1945 – April 1949
- Preceded by: George Fulford
- Succeeded by: George Fulford

Personal details
- Born: George Robert Webb; 10 July 1886 Gananoque, Ontario, Canada
- Died: 20 July 1958 (aged 72)
- Party: Progressive Conservative
- Spouse(s): Violet Duclos Britton m. 29 September 1926
- Profession: Automotive retailer, insurance agent

George Robert Webb (10 July 1886 – 20 July 1958) was a Progressive Conservative party member of the House of Commons of Canada. He was born in Gananoque, Ontario and became an insurance agent by career.

Webb was mayor of Gananoque, Ontario at one time. He owned and operated George R. Webb Insurance Agencies, and also the automotive retail firm Webb Motor Sales.

He was elected to Parliament at the Leeds riding in the 1945 general election and served one term, the 20th Canadian Parliament, then did not seek re-election in the 1949 election.
