= David Ford Jones =

Canadian politician (1818–1887)

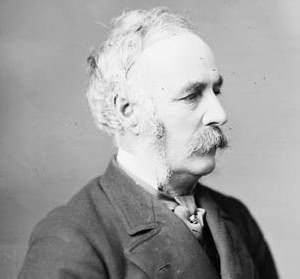
- Jones in 1879

Member of the House of Commons of Canada for Leeds South
- In office 1874 – 1882
- Prime Minister: John A. Macdonald; Alexander Mackenzie
- Preceded by: Albert Norton Richards
- Succeeded by: George Taylor

Member of the Legislative Assembly of the Province of Canada for Leeds South
- In office 1864 – 1867
- Preceded by: Albert Norton Richards

Personal details
- Born: August 22, 1818 Brockville, Ontario, Upper Canada
- Died: February 20, 1887 (aged 68) Gananoque, Ontario, Canada
- Party: Conservative
- Spouse: Rebecca Ogden Roebuck
- Parent(s): Jonas Jones (father); Mary Elizabeth Ford (mother)
- Education: Upper Canada College
- Occupation: Manufacturer

David Ford Jones (August 22, 1818 – February 20, 1887) was a Canadian manufacturer and political figure in Ontario. He represented Leeds South in the House of Commons of Canada as a Conservative member from 1874 to 1882.

He was born in Brockville, Ontario in 1818, the oldest son of Jonas Jones and Mary Elizabeth Ford, and studied at Upper Canada College. Jones set up business at Gananoque manufacturing farming tools. He served with the local militia during the 1837 Rebellions. He commanded an artillery unit at Gananoque which saw service during the Fenian raids. Jones also served as warden for Leeds and Grenville Counties. He was an unsuccessful candidate for the assembly for the Province of Canada in 1863, but was elected to the 8th Parliament of the Province of Canada representing South Leeds in an 1864 by-election held after Albert Norton Richards accepted the position of Solicitor General for Canada West. Jones did not run again in 1867, but was elected to the House of Commons in 1874 and 1878.

Jones married Rebecca Ogden Roebuck. He died in Gananoque at the age of 68.
