= Joe Jordan (politician) =

Canadian politician

The Honourable Joe Jordan PC

Member of Parliament for Leeds—Grenville
- In office June 2, 1997 – June 28, 2004
- Preceded by: Jim Jordan
- Succeeded by: Gord Brown

Personal details
- Born: November 19, 1958 (age 67) Pembroke, Ontario, Canada
- Party: Liberal

Joseph Louis Jordan, PC (born November 19, 1958) is a Canadian politician.

Jordan was a member of the Liberal Party of Canada in the House of Commons of Canada, representing the riding of Leeds—Grenville from 1997 to 2004. Jordan is a former businessman and university lecturer. He was parliamentary secretary to the Prime Minister, and parliamentary secretary to the president of the Treasury Board with special emphasis on regulatory reform.

He lost his seat in the 2004 election to Conservative candidate Gord Brown.

He was the son of his predecessor, Jim Jordan, and was the first federal politician in Canadian history to directly succeed his father as elected representative for the same constituency.
