= John Mathieson (minister) =

John Mathieson (1679–1752) was a Church of Scotland minister and religious author who successfully introduced a church fund to support the widows and children of ministers who died.

== Life ==
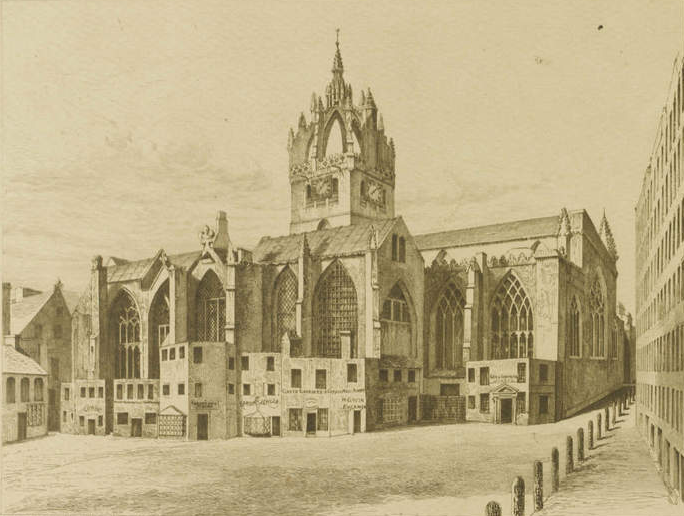
St Giles' in the 17th century (from Parliament Square)

He was born in 1679 and studied at Edinburgh University gaining an MA in 1699. He was licensed by the Presbytery of Edinburgh in April 1706 and ordained in December 1706 as minister of Tolbooth parish in Edinburgh and in 1710 to St Giles Cathedral.

In 1735 he was appointed Dean of the Chapel Royal (then located in Holyrood Abbey). In 1741 he successfully campaigned for the instigation of a fund to relieve hardship for the widows and children of ministers, the fund being begun in 1744.

He died on 8 November 1752.

== Family ==
In February 1708 he married Margaret Douglas, daughter of Robert Douglas, an Edinburgh merchant.

In April 1715 he married Isobel Hairstares daughter of Matthew Hairstares of Craigs, with whom he had two daughters and one son: Gilbert, Jean and Margaret. Margaret married George Ross, Provost of Montrose in 1736.

== Publications ==
- The Necessity of Divine Revelation, and Knowledge Thereof, in Order to Salvation (1730)
