= Leeds South (Canadian electoral district) =

Former federal electoral district in Ontario, Canada

Leeds South was a federal electoral district in Ontario, Canada, that was represented in the House of Commons of Canada from 1867 to 1904. It was created by the British North America Act 1867 which divided the County of Leeds into two ridings: a north riding and a south riding. The north riding was combined with the North Riding of the County of Grenville. The riding did not change its boundaries during its existence. It consisted of the Townships of North Crosby, South Crosby, Burgess South, Bastard, Leeds, Lansdowne, Escott and Yonge.

The electoral district was abolished in 1903 when it was merged into Leeds riding.

== Electoral history ==
1867 Canadian federal election
Party	Candidate	Votes	%
Conservative	John Willoughby Crawford	1,393	50.53
Unknown	Albert Norton Richards	1,364	49.47

Result by municipality

Municipality	Crawford	Richards	Total vote	Eligible voters
Gananoque	76	35	111	159
Front of Leeds Township	110	70	180	240
Rear of Leeds and Lansdowne Township	210	140	350	420
Front of Lansdowne Township	195	127	322	386
Front of Yonge Township	71	183	254	320
Rear of Yonge Township	133	166	299	346
Bastard and Burgess Townships	247	332	579	663
Front of Escott Township	92	86	178	223
North Crosby Township	114	100	214	264
South Crosby Township	145	125	270	312
Total	1,393	1,364	2,757	3,333

1872 Canadian federal election
Party	Candidate	Votes	%
Liberal	Albert Norton Richards	1,270	50.24
Unknown	George Morton	1,258	49.76

1874 Canadian federal election
Party	Candidate	Votes	%
Conservative	David Ford Jones	1,602	50.05
Unknown	W.H. Fredenburgh	1,599	49.95

1878 Canadian federal election
Party	Candidate	Votes	%
Conservative	David Ford Jones	1,904	51.64
Unknown	W.H. Fredenburgh	1,783	48.36

1882 Canadian federal election
Party	Candidate	Votes	%
Conservative	George Taylor	1,993	53.73
Unknown	C.E. Britton	1,716	46.27

1887 Canadian federal election
Party	Candidate	Votes	%
Conservative	George Taylor	2,456	54.63
Liberal	C.E. Britton	2,040	45.37

1891 Canadian federal election
Party	Candidate	Votes	%
Conservative	George Taylor	2,294	51.18
Liberal	J.B. Turner	2,188	48.82

1896 Canadian federal election
Party	Candidate	Votes	%
Conservative	George Taylor	2,501	52.36
Liberal	William H. Fredenburgh	2,013	42.14
Patrons of Industry	James H. Horton	263	5.51

1900 Canadian federal election
Party	Candidate	Votes	%
Conservative	George Taylor	2,472	54.52
Liberal	William A. Lewis	2,062	45.48

== See also ==
- List of Canadian electoral districts
- Historical federal electoral districts of Canada
