= By-elections to the 36th Canadian Parliament =

1997–2000 elections for vacant seats

By-elections to the 36th Canadian Parliament were held to fill vacancies in the House of Commons of Canada between the 1997 federal election and the 2000 federal election. The Liberal Party of Canada led a majority government for the entirety of the 36th Canadian Parliament, with increases from by-elections.

Ten seats became vacant during the life of the Parliament. All of these vacancies were filled through by-elections.

By-election	Date	Incumbent	Party	Winner	Party	Cause	Retained
Okanagan—Coquihalla	September 11, 2000	Jim Hart	Canadian Alliance	Stockwell Day	Canadian Alliance	Resignation to provide a seat for Day	Yes
Kings—Hants	September 11, 2000	Scott Brison	Progressive Conservative	Joe Clark	Progressive Conservative	Resignation to provide a seat for Clark	Yes
St. John's West	May 15, 2000	Charlie Power	Progressive Conservative	Loyola Hearn	Progressive Conservative	Resignation	Yes
York West	November 15, 1999	Sergio Marchi	Liberal	Judy Sgro	Liberal	Resignation	Yes
Hull—Aylmer	November 15, 1999	Marcel Massé	Liberal	Marcel Proulx	Liberal	Resignation	Yes
Mount Royal	November 15, 1999	Sheila Finestone	Liberal	Irwin Cotler	Liberal	Resignation	Yes
Saskatoon—Rosetown—Biggar	November 15, 1999	Chris Axworthy	New Democratic	Dennis Gruending	New Democratic	Resignation	Yes
Windsor—St. Clair	April 12, 1999	Shaughnessy Cohen	Liberal	Rick Limoges	Liberal	Death (cerebral hemorrhage)	Yes
Sherbrooke	September 14, 1998	Jean Charest	Progressive Conservative	Serge Cardin	Bloc Québécois	Resignation to accept leadership of the Liberal Party of Quebec and enter provincial politics	No
Port Moody—Coquitlam	March 30, 1998	Sharon Hayes	Reform	Lou Sekora	Liberal	Resignation	No

== See also ==
- List of federal by-elections in Canada

== Sources ==
- Parliament of Canada–Elected in By-Elections
