= By-elections to the 33rd Canadian Parliament =

Federal by-election in Canada

By-elections to the 33rd Canadian Parliament were held to fill vacancies in the House of Commons of Canada between the 1984 federal election and the 1988 federal election. The Progressive Conservative Party of Canada led a majority government for the entirety of the 33rd Canadian Parliament, though their number did decrease from by-elections.

Eleven seats became vacant during the life of the Parliament. Six of these vacancies were filled through by-elections, and five seats remained vacant when the 1988 federal election was called.

By-election	Date	Incumbent	Party	Winner	Party	Cause	Retained
Lac-Saint-Jean	June 20, 1988	Clément Côté	Progressive Conservative	Lucien Bouchard	Progressive Conservative	Resignation	Yes
St. John's East	July 20, 1987	James A. McGrath	Progressive Conservative	Jack Harris	New Democratic	Resignation	No
Hamilton Mountain	July 20, 1987	Ian Deans	New Democratic	Marion Dewar	New Democratic	Resignation	Yes
Yukon	July 20, 1987	Erik Nielsen	Progressive Conservative	Audrey McLaughlin	New Democratic	Resignation	No
Pembina	September 29, 1986	Peter Elzinga	Progressive Conservative	Walter van de Walle	Progressive Conservative	Resignation	Yes
Saint-Maurice	September 29, 1986	Jean Chrétien	Liberal	Gilles Grondin	Liberal	Resignation	Yes

== See also ==
- List of federal by-elections in Canada
