= John Matheson =

Canadian politician

The Honourable John Matheson OC CD QC FRHSC
- Official 1966 portrait

Member of Parliament for Leeds
- In office 29 May 1961 – 24 June 1968
- Preceded by: Hayden Stanton
- Succeeded by: Desmond Code

Personal details
- Born: John Ross Matheson; 14 November 1917 Arundel, Quebec, Canada
- Died: 27 December 2013 (aged 96) Kingston, Ontario, Canada
- Party: Liberal
- Spouse: Edith Bickley (m. 1945)
- Children: 6
- Relatives: Peter Milliken (cousin); Stanley Harwood McCuaig (uncle)
- Education: Queen's University (BA); Osgoode Hall Law School (LLB); Mount Allison University (MA); University of Western Ontario (LLM)
- Profession: Judge; barrister; lawyer

Military service
- Allegiance: Canada
- Branch/service: Canadian Army
- Years of service: 1937–1945
- Rank: Colonel
- Unit: Royal Canadian Horse Artillery; 1st Canadian Infantry Division; Royal Canadian Artillery
- Battles/wars: World War II

John Ross Matheson (14 November 1917 – 27 December 2013) was a Canadian politician, lawyer, and judge, who helped develop both the national flag of Canada and the Order of Canada.

== Early life ==
John Matheson was born in Arundel, Quebec, the son of the Reverend Dr. Alexander Dawson Matheson and his wife, Gertrude Matheson (née McCuaig). Matheson underwent training at the Royal Military College of Canada in 1936. He graduated from Queen's University in 1940, winning the prestigious Tricolour Award in that year for distinguished achievement.

== Military career ==
Matheson served as an officer with the 1st Field Regiment, Royal Canadian Horse Artillery, 1st Canadian Infantry Division in Italy during World War II.

Matheson participated in the Battle of Ortona, where an air bursting German shell sent shrapnel into his head and caused damage similar to a stroke. He was left paralyzed from the neck down and unable to speak. He recovered after returning to Canada, but never regained the use of his right leg. His injuries caused him lifelong pain, and afterwards, he usually walked with the assistance of a cane.

Matheson held honorary militia appointments with the 30th Field Artillery Regiment, Royal Regiment of Canadian Artillery from 1972 to 1982. Afterwards, he retired with the rank of Colonel.

== Family and legal career ==
After the war, Matheson met Edith Bickley, a radiologist's assistant, in St. Anne de Bellevue Hospital in Montreal, Quebec. He said they would never have met if she hadn’t been such a curious nurse. The couple married and eventually had six children. He received a Bachelor of Laws degree from Osgoode Hall Law School, a Master of Arts degree from Mount Allison University, and a Master of Laws degree from the University of Western Ontario. He was called to the Bar of Ontario in 1948 and was created a Queen's Counsel in 1967. He practiced law with the firm of Matheson, Henderson & Hart in Brockville, Ontario. A member of the United Church of Canada, Matheson resided in Kingston, Ontario until his death in December 2013.

== Political career ==
John Matheson was elected as a Liberal Member of Parliament in the Ontario riding of Leeds in a 1961 by-election. He was re-elected in 1962, 1963, and 1965.

Matheson lost his seat in Parliament when he was defeated by 4 votes (a margin of 0.0137%) in the 1968 Federal Election. This was the first election after the riding of Leeds absorbed the traditionally conservative-voting townships of North Burgess, North Elmsley and Montague. He was the only incumbent Liberal not to be re-elected in the 1968 "Trudeaumania" election.

Matheson was a leading member of the multi-party parliamentary committee whose mandate was to select a new flag design for Canada. He and Dr. George Stanley (then Dean of Arts at the Royal Military College) collaborated on the design which was ultimately approved by Parliament and by Royal Proclamation adopted as the National Flag of Canada as of the 15th of February 1965. Matheson wrote a book, Canada's Flag: A Search for a Country, about the creation of the new flag.

Matheson later played an important role in the creation of the Order of Canada, as one of its founders. He also influenced the design of the order's insignia, created by Bruce W. Beatty.

Matheson was portrayed by Peter MacNeill in a Heritage Minute television commercial about his involvement in the Flag committee.

== Judicial appointment ==
In 1968, Matheson was appointed a judge of the Judicial District of Ottawa-Carleton. In 1984, he was appointed a judge of the County Court of Lanark. In 1985, he was appointed a judge of the District Court of Ontario. From 1990 to 1992, he was a justice of the Ontario Court of Justice (General Division).

One of Matheson's most notable decisions was in Clark v. Clark, a case that heavily influenced the law regarding the capacity of disabled persons. Matheson ruled that 20-year-old Justin Clark, who suffered from cerebral palsy, was mentally competent to make his own decisions and should not be forced into the guardianship of his parents. The case has been described as "a pivotal moment in the Canadian disability rights movement" and lead to a widespread re-examination of provincial guardianship laws. Matheson later described giving this decision as his proudest moment.

== Honours ==
Matheson was the inaugural recipient of the Distinguished Service Award from the Canadian Association of Former Parliamentarians, awarded to a former parliamentarian "who has made an outstanding contribution to the country and its democratic institutions." (1999) He was also made a Fellow of the Royal Heraldry Society of Canada in 1979 as one of its founding members.

=== Canadian medals, orders, and decorations ===
Ribbon	Description	Notes	Ref
	Canadian Centennial Medal	Awarded in 1967	
	Canadian Forces' Decoration	Awarded in 1977	
	Queen Elizabeth II Silver Jubilee Medal for Canada	Awarded in 1977	
	125th Anniversary of the Confederation of Canada Medal	Awarded in 1992	
	Officer of the Order of Canada	Awarded in 1993	
	Queen Elizabeth II Golden Jubilee Medal for Canada	Awarded in 2002	
	Queen Elizabeth II Diamond Jubilee Medal for Canada	Awarded in 2012	
	Knight of Justice of the Order of St. John		

=== Other ===
- Knight Commander of Merit of the Order of Saint Lazarus.

=== Memorials ===
The John Matheson Sword is awarded annually to the Preparatory Year cadet at the Royal Military College Saint-Jean who achieved the highest results in all four components of the College’s program, namely Academics, Leadership, Athletics and Bilingualism.

=== Arms ===
Coat of arms of John Matheson
Adopted September 14, 1959 (grant from the Court of the Lord Lyon); March 20, 1990 (registered by the Canadian Heraldic Authority) Crest Within a loyalist military coronet Or leaved Gules a dexter hand and forearm proper issuant holding a plough culter in bend Vert Escutcheon Gyonny of eight Sable and Gules a lion rampant Or armed and langued Azure over all a fess Argent charged with three hawks' heads erased Gules Motto Facio spero (Latin for 'I do, I hope') Badge The Crest within a Canadian belt Sable buckle inscribed with the Motto Or
