= Gord Brown =

Canadian politician (1960–2018)

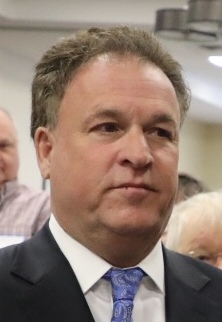

Chief Opposition Whip
- In office November 11, 2015 – July 19, 2017
- Leader: Rona Ambrose; Andrew Scheer
- Preceded by: Nycole Turmel
- Succeeded by: Mark Strahl

Chair of the Standing Committee on Canadian Heritage
- In office October 29, 2013 – August 2, 2015
- Minister: Shelly Glover
- Preceded by: Rob Moore

Member of Parliament for Leeds—Grenville—Thousand Islands and Rideau Lakes (Leeds—Grenville; 2004–2015)
- In office June 28, 2004 – May 2, 2018
- Preceded by: Joe Jordan
- Succeeded by: Michael Barrett

Personal details
- Born: Gordon Keith Brown; August 31, 1960 Toronto, Ontario, Canada
- Died: May 2, 2018 (aged 57) Ottawa, Ontario, Canada
- Party: Conservative
- Spouse: Claudine Courtois
- Children: 2
- Education: Carleton University
- Profession: Innkeeper

Gordon Keith Brown (August 31, 1960 – May 2, 2018) was a Canadian politician who represented the Ontario riding of Leeds—Grenville—Thousand Islands and Rideau Lakes in the House of Commons of Canada as a member of the Conservative Party from 2004 until his death.

== Background ==
Born in Toronto, Brown graduated from Gananoque Secondary School and had a degree in political science from Carleton University (1983), and an interest in a family-run business in Gananoque, Ontario.

Brown graduated from Gananoque Secondary School and Carleton University – B.A. (Hons) – Political Science.

Active in sports, Brown was a Canadian Kayaking Champion with the Gananoque Canoe Club and competed internationally and also competed in the world championship in 1988. Later in life, he was known to play hockey in the winter and golf and kayaking in the summer.

Prior to entering federal politics, Brown was a Gananoque town councillor; President of the 1000 Islands-Gananoque Chamber of Commerce, and chair of the St. Lawrence Parks Commission (operators of Fort Henry, Upper Canada Village and other attractions).

He was an active member of federal and provincial conservative associations since his youth.

== Political career ==
Brown introduced a number of Private Members' Bills in the House of Commons: In 2008, C-393, also known as the Knife Bill, passed Second Reading and was at committee when the House dissolved, also in 2008 he introduced Bill C-542, which would provide for Employment Insurance Benefits for working parents of critically ill children. The provisions of C-542 later became law as part of government Bill C-44 in 2012. Brown also introduced C-370 a bill to change the name of the St. Lawrence Islands National Park of Canada to Thousand Islands National Park of Canada which became law in 2013.

Brown was appointed by Prime Minister Justin Trudeau, on the advice of Conservative Party of Canada Leader Andrew Scheer, to sit on the National Security and Intelligence Committee of Parliamentarians on November 6, 2017, and served on the committee until his death. From 2013 until the 2015 election, Brown was chair of the Standing Committee on Canadian Heritage and the House of Commons Chair of the Canada-United States Inter-Parliamentary Group. He was a member of the Trilateral Commission. He also sat on several all-party caucuses focusing on rural, health, border and other issues and also participated in numerous parliamentary groups.

Brown was chosen in an earlier Parliament by then-Prime Minister Stephen Harper to chair the special committee that reviewed the Anti-Terrorism Act. He also served as chair of the Ontario Conservative Caucus under Harper.

== Personal life and death ==
Brown was married to Claudine and had two sons, one of whom was born from a previous marriage to Sherry Brown.

Brown died on May 2, 2018, aged 57, after having a heart attack at his office on Parliament Hill.

== Electoral record ==
2015 Canadian federal election: Leeds—Grenville—Thousand Islands and Rideau Lakes
Party	Candidate	Votes	%	±%	Expenditures
Conservative	Gord Brown	26,738	47.4	-13.4	–
Liberal	Mary Jean McFall	22,888	40.6	+24.71	–
New Democratic	Margaret Andrade	4,722	8.4	-9.91	–
Green	Lorraine A. Rekmans	2,088	3.7	-1.29	–
Total valid votes/expense limit		56,436	100.0		$212,627.66
Total rejected ballots		189	–	–	
Turnout		56,625	–	–	
Eligible voters		79,195			
Conservative hold		Swing		-19.6	
Source: Elections Canada

2011 Canadian federal election: Leeds—Grenville
Party	Candidate	Votes	%	±%	Expenditures
Conservative	Gord Brown	29,991	60.81	+2.36	$69,695
New Democratic	Matthew Gabriel	9,033	18.31	+4.46	$5,092
Liberal	Marjory Loveys	7,839	15.89	-1.29	$52,628
Green	Mary Slade	2,460	4.99	-4.63	$17,743
Total valid votes/expense limit		49,323	100.00		$145,158
Total rejected ballots		156	0.32	-0.08	
Turnout		49,479	65.10	+3.24	
Eligible voters		76,001	–	–	
Conservative hold		Swing		+1.83	

2008 Canadian federal election: Leeds—Grenville
Party	Candidate	Votes	%	±%	Expenditures
Conservative	Gord Brown	27,473	58.44	+3.78	$55,637
Liberal	Marjory Loveys	8,075	17.18	-7.14	$31,418
New Democratic	Steve Armstrong	6,511	13.85	-1.41	$6,532
Green	Jeanie Warnock	4,522	9.62	+3.85	$10,790
Progressive Canadian	John McCrea	426	0.91	*	$291
Total valid votes/expense limit		47,007	100.00		$104,668
Rejected ballots		186	0.39	–	
Turnout		47,193	62.86	-7.65	
Conservative hold		Swing		+5.46	

2006 Canadian federal election: Leeds—Grenville
Party	Candidate	Votes	%	±%	Expenditures
Conservative	Gord Brown	28,447	54.66	+4.20	$69,350
Liberal	Bob Eaton	12,661	24.32	-8.61	$28,806
New Democratic	Steve Armstrong	7,945	15.26	+3.94	$7,043
Green	David Lee	3,003	5.77	+0.49	$450
Total valid votes		52,056	100.00		
Conservative hold		Swing		+6.41	

2004 Canadian federal election: Leeds—Grenville
Party	Candidate	Votes	%	±%	Expenditures
Conservative	Gord Brown	26,002	50.46	-5.81	$69,173
Liberal	Joe Jordan	16,967	32.93	-6.58	$60,373
New Democratic	Steve Armstrong	5,834	11.32	+9.22	$10,009
Green	Chris Bradshaw	2,722	5.28	+3.55	$532
Total valid votes		51,525	100.00		
Conservative gain from Liberal		Swing		+0.77	

2000 Canadian federal election: Leeds—Grenville
Party	Candidate	Votes	%	±%	Expenditures
Liberal	Joe Jordan	18,594	39.51	+0.04	$52,586
Alliance	Gord Brown	18,539	39.39	+17.77	$61,645
Progressive Conservative	John Johnston	7,940	16.87	-15.40	$55,627
New Democratic	Martin Hanratty	990	2.10	-1.53	$1,764
Green	Jerry Heath	816	1.73	-0.54	$3,302
Canadian Action	Jane Pamela Scharf	181	0.38	*	$0
Total valid votes		47,060	100.00		
Liberal hold		Swing		+7.72	
