= Hitzig v Canada =

Hitzig v Canada is a 2003 civil case that challenged the constitutionality of the Marihuana Medical Access Regulations (MMAR), now the Medical Marihuana Access Division. MMAR provided for exemptions from the law for approved medicinal users while allowing for no legal source of therapeutic cannabis products. The case was brought by Warren Hitzig, along with seven medical marijuana users (Alison Myrden, Stephen J Vandekemp, Marco Renda, Marylynne Chamney, Catherine Devries, Jari Dvorak and Debbie Stultz-Giffen).

Warren Saul Hitzig co-founded the Toronto Compassion Centre (originally the 'Medical Marijuana Resource Centre') in 1997 to provide high quality cannabis products to those with a documented medicinal need and to act as a medical marijuana information resource for the Canadian general public. The centre's formation was announced in early 1998 with a press conference and letter to the Canadian government requesting authorization for their activities.

The Hitzig applicants argued that the MMAR provided an illusory access to cannabis medicine, and effectively encouraged sick Canadians to look to the black market for their legal medication, and/or the seeds/plants needed to 'grow their own.' Ontario Superior Court judge Sidney Lederman agreed that this situation violated the rights of the applicants as set out by the Canadian Charter of Rights and Freedoms (1982). He gave the Canadian government six months from January 9, 2003, to remedy the situation, which prompted the controversial announcement on July 8 that Health Canada would begin distribution of marijuana grown under contract to Prairie Plant Systems in Flin Flon, Manitoba.

== Details on plaintiff Alison Myrden ==
Alison Myrden first approached Law Professor Alan Young in the Spring of 1999 to form and submit a lawsuit to sue the Government of Canada for a safe, clean, and affordable source of marijuana. This became the 'Hitzig et al.' Lawsuit. Warren was the only person involved who was not a medical user and could front the suit as a Cannabis Compassion Club.

In 1995, Alison retired from law enforcement and was given her first prescription for Medical Marijuana by a Canadian Physician. She was sent to the street to buy her medicine by the government of Canada before there was such a thing as 'The Medical Marijuana Access Regulations' (MMAR). Alison was one of the first twenty people in Canada to receive a Federal Licence to smoke, possess and grow medical marijuana for health reasons. Battling multiple sclerosis from the age of 13 years, Alison's worst physical problem today is a stabbing pain in her face 24 hours a day associated with MS, called 'Tic Douloureux'.

Having been allotted one of the largest prescriptions in the country for cannabis and having not to depend on 32 pills a day and 2000 mg of morphine everyday any more from the past 15 years, Alison's life has dramatically improved. In 2004 Alison ran for the New Democratic Party in Oakville, Ontario, more than doubling the votes for the New Democratic Party from the previous federal election.

== Citation ==
Hitzig v. Canada, 2003 CanLII 30796 (ON C.A.)
