= Leeds (federal electoral district) =

Former federal electoral district in Ontario, Canada

Ontario electoral district

Defunct federal electoral district
- Legislature: House of Commons
- District created: 1903
- District abolished: 1976
- First contested: 1904
- Last contested: 1974

Leeds was a federal electoral district represented in the House of Commons of Canada from 1904 to 1979. It was located in the province of Ontario. This riding was first created in 1903 from parts of Leeds North and Grenville North and Leeds South ridings.

It was initially defined to consist of the county of Leeds, excluding parts included in the electoral district of Brockville. The Brockville riding was initially defined as the Town of Brockville and the Township of Elizabethtown. From 1882 to 1903 it included the Township of Kitley and from 1903 to 1914 it also included the Townships of Yonge and Escott, Front, Yonge and Escott, Rear and the village of Athens.

It 1914, it was redefined to consist of the whole county of Leeds, including the town of Brockville. In 1966 it added the Townships of North Burgess, North Elmsley and Montague excepting the Village of Merrickville from Lanark County.

The electoral district was abolished in 1976 when it was redistributed between Lanark—Renfrew—Carleton and Leeds—Grenville ridings.

== Members of Parliament ==
This riding has elected the following members of Parliament:

Parliament	Years	Member	Party
Riding created from Leeds North and Grenville North and Leeds South
10th	1904–1908	George Taylor	Conservative
11th	1908–1911	George Taylor	Conservative
12th	1911–1911	George Taylor	Conservative
12th	1911–1917	William Thomas White	Conservative
13th	1917–1921	William Thomas White	Government (Unionist)
14th	1921–1925	Hugh Alexander Stewart	Conservative
15th	1925–1926	Hugh Alexander Stewart	Conservative
16th	1926–1930	Hugh Alexander Stewart	Conservative
17th	1930–1930	Hugh Alexander Stewart	Conservative
17th	1930–1935	Hugh Alexander Stewart	Conservative
18th	1935–1940	Hugh Alexander Stewart	Conservative
19th	1940–1945	George Fulford	Liberal
20th	1945–1949	George Webb	Progressive Conservative
21st	1949–1953	George Fulford	Liberal
22nd	1953–1957	Hayden Stanton	Progressive Conservative
23rd	1957–1958	Hayden Stanton	Progressive Conservative
24th	1958–1960†	Hayden Stanton	Progressive Conservative
24th	1961–1962	John Matheson	Liberal
25th	1962–1963	John Matheson	Liberal
26th	1963–1965	John Matheson	Liberal
27th	1965–1968	John Matheson	Liberal
28th	1968–1972	Desmond Code	Progressive Conservative
29th	1972–1974	Thomas Cossitt	Progressive Conservative
30th	1974–1979	Thomas Cossitt	Progressive Conservative
Riding dissolved into Leeds—Grenville and Lanark—Renfrew—Carleton

== Election results ==
1904 Canadian federal election
Party	Candidate	Votes	%
Conservative	George Taylor	2,175	59.09
Liberal	W.J. Gibson	1,506	40.91

1908 Canadian federal election
Party	Candidate	Votes	%
Conservative	George Taylor	2,356	62.20
Liberal	William Cushing Fredenburgh	1,432	37.80

1911 Canadian federal election
Party	Candidate	Votes	%
Conservative	George Taylor	2,392	62.23
Liberal	Firman Cross	1,452	37.77

On Mr. George Taylor's resignation on 25 October 1911:

By-election on 6 November 1911
Party	Candidate	Votes
Conservative	William Thomas White	acclaimed

1917 Canadian federal election
Party	Candidate	Votes	%
Government (Unionist)	William Thomas White	7,236	64.01
Opposition (Laurier Liberals)	Arthur Charles Hardy	4,069	35.99

1921 Canadian federal election
Party	Candidate	Votes	%
Conservative	Hugh Alexander Stewart	7,868	45.58
Liberal	Amassa Whitney Mallory	5,830	33.77
Progressive	George Fletcher Warren	3,564	20.65

1925 Canadian federal election
Party	Candidate	Votes	%
Conservative	Hugh Alexander Stewart	8,931	57.18
Liberal	William Henry Comstock	6,689	42.82

1926 Canadian federal election
Party	Candidate	Votes	%
Conservative	Hugh Alexander Stewart	9,092	55.99
Liberal	William Henry Comstock	7,148	44.01

1930 Canadian federal election
Party	Candidate	Votes	%
Conservative	Hugh Alexander Stewart	9,401	60.04
Liberal	James Roderick MacLaren	6,256	39.96

On Mr. Stewart's acceptance of an office of emolument under the Crown, 7 August 1930:

Canadian federal by-election, 25 August 1930
Party	Candidate	Votes
Conservative	Hugh Alexander Stewart	Acclaimed

1935 Canadian federal election
Party	Candidate	Votes	%
Conservative	Hugh Alexander Stewart	9,487	49.63
Liberal	Donald Elswood Lewis	8,737	45.71
Reconstruction	Frank William Logan	892	4.67

1940 Canadian federal election
Party	Candidate	Votes	%
Liberal	George Fulford	10,322	55.65
National Government	Hugh Alexander Stewart	8,227	44.35

1945 Canadian federal election
Party	Candidate	Votes	%
Progressive Conservative	George Webb	9,714	51.44
Liberal	George Fulford	8,263	43.76
Co-operative Commonwealth	Albert Earl Godfrey	907	4.80

1949 Canadian federal election
Party	Candidate	Votes	%
Liberal	George Fulford	10,080	50.20
Progressive Conservative	John Lionel Carroll	9,302	46.32
Co-operative Commonwealth	Stewart Hastie	699	3.48

1953 Canadian federal election
Party	Candidate	Votes	%
Progressive Conservative	Hayden Stanton	10,097	50.91
Liberal	George Fulford	9,736	49.09

1957 Canadian federal election
Party	Candidate	Votes	%
Progressive Conservative	Hayden Stanton	11,065	51.26
Liberal	George Fulford	10,125	46.91
Social Credit	Charles William Shaw	395	1.83

1958 Canadian federal election
Party	Candidate	Votes	%
Progressive Conservative	Hayden Stanton	12,675	58.09
Liberal	George Fulford	9,145	41.91

On Mr. Stanton's death, 8 December 1960:

Canadian federal by-election, 29 May 1961
Party	Candidate	Votes	%
Liberal	John Matheson	11,352	56.32
Unknown	Richard Elwood Stewart	8,804	43.68

1962 Canadian federal election
Party	Candidate	Votes	%
Liberal	John Matheson	12,071	52.90
Progressive Conservative	Jack Langmuir	10,325	45.25
Social Credit	Bill Hunter	424	1.86

1963 Canadian federal election
Party	Candidate	Votes	%
Liberal	John Matheson	12,113	55.03
Progressive Conservative	Frances D. MacOdrum	9,899	44.97

1965 Canadian federal election
Party	Candidate	Votes	%
Liberal	John Matheson	10,365	48.49
Progressive Conservative	John MacLean	10,066	47.09
New Democratic	William F. Thompson	946	4.43

1968 Canadian federal election
Party	Candidate	Votes	%
Progressive Conservative	Desmond Code	13,536	46.56
Liberal	John Matheson	13,532	46.54
New Democratic	Clayton C. Graves	2,005	6.90

1972 Canadian federal election
Party	Candidate	Votes	%
Progressive Conservative	Thomas Cossitt	18,130	53.91
Liberal	Gervis Black	10,650	31.67
New Democratic	Keith Sutcliffe	4,850	14.42

1974 Canadian federal election
Party	Candidate	Votes	%
Progressive Conservative	Thomas Cossitt	17,744	53.37
Liberal	Donna M. Healey	10,845	32.62
New Democratic	Keith Sutcliffe	4,659	14.01

== See also ==
- List of Canadian electoral districts
- Historical federal electoral districts of Canada
