= Thomas Cossitt =

Canadian politician

Thomas Charles Cossitt

Member of Parliament for Leeds
- In office 20 October 1972 – 21 May 1979
- Preceded by: Desmond Code
- Succeeded by: District was abolished in 1976

Member of Parliament for Leeds—Grenville
- In office 22 May 1979 – 15 March 1982
- Preceded by: District was created in 1976
- Succeeded by: Jennifer Cossitt

Personal details
- Born: 15 November 1923 Brockville, Ontario, Canada
- Died: 15 March 1982 (aged 58) Brockville, Ontario, Canada
- Party: Progressive Conservative
- Spouse: Jennifer Cossitt

Thomas Charles Cossitt (15 November 1923 – 15 March 1982) was a Canadian politician.

Born in Brockville, Ontario, the son of Edwin Comstock Cossitt and Marjorie Helen Delahaye, he graduated from St. Andrew's College and received a Bachelor of Arts degree from the University of Toronto. After graduating, he was the owner and president of an insurance company. He was president of the Eastern Ontario Liberal Federation and a vice-president of the Ontario Liberal Party. However, he switched to the Progressive Conservatives before being elected to the House of Commons of Canada in the 1972 election in the riding of Leeds. He was re-elected in 1974, 1979, and 1980, the last two elections in the riding of Leeds—Grenville.

Cossitt's positions on bilingualism were a topic of discussion during the 1972 and 1974 elections. During the 1972 election, he took out newspaper advertisements with the tagline "I'm not anti-French, but...". In the 1974 election, he was quoted in the Montreal Gazette as saying "Instant bilingualism is not only stupid and arrogant, it's just plain nuts". Cossitt stressed that while he supported both official languages, it was necessary to consider the financial burden of the Trudeau government's new policies.

Cossitt, who had two previous heart attacks, collapsed from a third heart attack during a photo session at the annual directors' meeting of the Leeds-Grenville Progressive Conservative Riding Association on the evening of 15 March 1982. He was taken to Brockville General Hospital, where he was pronounced dead about an hour later, aged 58. His second wife, Jennifer Cossitt (née Birchall) was elected in the resulting by-election and re-elected in the 1984 election before being defeated in the 1988 election.
