= Jennifer Cossitt =

Canadian politician

Member of Parliament for Leeds—Grenville
- In office 12 October 1982 – 20 November 1988
- Preceded by: Thomas Cossitt
- Succeeded by: Jim Jordan

Personal details
- Born: Jennifer Birchall; 22 June 1948 (age 77) Redcar, Yorkshire, England
- Party: Progressive Conservative
- Spouse: Thomas Cossitt
- Occupation: Business executive

Jennifer Cossitt (née Birchall; born 22 June 1948) was a Progressive Conservative party member of the House of Commons of Canada. She was a business executive by career.

Her husband was Thomas Cossitt, member of Parliament for the Leeds—Grenville electoral district. Cossitt served as her husband's executive assistant for nine years. Following his death in 1982, she campaigned at the riding in a 12 October 1982 by-election and won the seat. Cossitt took a fifth-ballot victory at a nominating convention of Leeds-Grenville Conservative Riding Association in the town of Prescott, Ontario, gaining 262 votes.

Jennifer Cossitt won re-election in the 1984 federal election, but was defeated in the following 1988 federal election by Jim Jordan of the Liberal party. She served for the latter part of the 32nd Canadian Parliament and a full term in the 33rd Parliament.

== Election results ==
1988 Canadian federal election
Party	Candidate	Votes	%	±%
Liberal	Jim Jordan	20,141	43.39	+20.07
Progressive Conservative	Jennifer Cossitt	18,053	38.89	-22.61
New Democratic	Barry Grills	5,141	11.08	-2.88
Christian Heritage	David Butcher	1,584	3.41	
Confederation of Regions	Faye Garner	1,497	3.23	
Total valid votes		46,416	100.00	

1984 Canadian federal election
Party	Candidate	Votes	%	±%
Progressive Conservative	Jennifer Cossitt	26,961	61.50	+4.50
Liberal	Chuck Anderson	10,222	23.32	+2.59
New Democratic	Jan Allen	6,121	13.96	+5.44
Green	Mike Nickerson	348	0.79	
Libertarian	Hans Wienhold	190	0.43	-13.01
Total valid votes		43,842	100.00	

Canadian federal by-election, 12 October 1982
Party	Candidate	Votes	%	±%
upon Tom Cossitt's death on 15 March 1982
Progressive Conservative	Jennifer Cossitt	18,401	57.00	+5.78
Liberal	Chuck Anderson	6,693	20.73	-10.98
Libertarian	Neil Reynolds	4,337	13.44	
New Democratic	Mildred Smith	2,751	8.52	-8.55
Independent	Ray Turmel	99	0.31	
Total valid votes		32,281	100.00	

== See also ==
- Politics of Canada
