= Leeds—Grenville—Thousand Islands—Rideau Lakes =

Federal electoral district in Ontario, Canada

Coordinates: 44.681°N 75.882°W

Ontario electoral district
- Interactive map of riding boundaries (previously named Leeds—Grenville—Thousand Islands and Rideau Lakes) from the 2015 federal election

Federal electoral district
- Legislature: House of Commons
MP
Michael Barrett
Conservative
- District created: 1976
- First contested: 1979
- Last contested: 2021
- District webpage: profile, map

Demographics
- Population (2016): 100,546
- Electors (2015): 78,225
- Area (km²): 3,382.89
- Pop. density (per km²): 29.7
- Census division: Leeds and Grenville
- Census subdivision(s): Brockville, North Grenville, Rideau Lakes, Leeds and the Thousand Islands, Elizabethtown-Kitley, Edwardsburgh/Cardinal, Augusta, Gananoque, Prescott, Merrickville–Wolford

Leeds—Grenville—Thousand Islands—Rideau Lakes is a federal electoral district in Ontario, Canada, that has been represented in the House of Commons since 1979. Prior to the 2025 election, the riding was known as Leeds—Grenville—Thousand Islands and Rideau Lakes, and prior to the 2015 election as Leeds—Grenville.

The 2018 Leeds—Grenville—Thousand Islands and Rideau Lakes federal by-election was won by Michael Barrett. Michael has represented this riding since December 3, 2018.

== Geography ==
The riding consists of the entirety of the United Counties of Leeds and Grenville.

== Demographics ==
According to the 2021 Canadian census

Ethnic groups: 91.3% White, 5.6% Indigenous
Languages: 91.7% English, 3.2% French
Religions: 60.6% Christian (22.2% Catholic, 11.5% United Church, 9.9% Anglican, 2.3% Presbyterian, 1.3% Methodist, 1.3% Pentecostal, 12.1% other), 37.7% none
Median income: $41,600 (2020)
Average income: $51,040 (2020)

== History ==
The federal district was created in 1976 as Leeds—Grenville from parts of Grenville–Carleton and Leeds ridings.

It was initially defined as consisting of the County of Grenville and the County of Leeds, excluding the Town of Smiths Falls. Since 1987, it was re-defined as consisting of the United Counties of Leeds and Grenville, but this did not result in any boundary changes, as Smiths Falls is not part of the county. The 2003 redistribution defined the riding as also including the independent municipalities of Brockville, Gananoque and Prescott which are politically separate jurisdictions, but are geographically within the county, and therefore did not result in a boundary change either.

With the 2012 electoral redistribution, this district lost a small portion of territory to Lanark—Frontenac—Kingston, following an annexation of a parcel of land by the Town Smiths Falls. In the process, the riding was renamed Leeds—Grenville—Thousand Islands and Rideau Lakes.

Following the 2022 Canadian federal electoral redistribution, this riding was renamed Leeds—Grenville—Thousand Islands—Rideau Lakes prior to the 2025 Canadian federal election.

== Members of Parliament ==
This riding has elected the following members of Parliament:

Parliament	Years	Member	Party
Leeds—Grenville; Riding created from Grenville—Carleton and Leeds
31st	1979–1980	Thomas Cossitt	Progressive Conservative
32nd	1980–1982	Thomas Cossitt	Progressive Conservative
32nd	1982–1984	Jennifer Cossitt	Progressive Conservative
33rd	1984–1988	Jennifer Cossitt	Progressive Conservative
34th	1988–1993	Jim Jordan	Liberal
35th	1993–1997	Jim Jordan	Liberal
36th	1997–2000	Joe Jordan	Liberal
37th	2000–2004	Joe Jordan	Liberal
38th	2004–2006	Gord Brown	Conservative
39th	2006–2008	Gord Brown	Conservative
40th	2008–2011	Gord Brown	Conservative
41st	2011–2015	Gord Brown	Conservative
Leeds—Grenville—Thousand Islands and Rideau Lakes
42nd	2015–2018	Gord Brown	Conservative
42nd	2018–2019	Michael Barrett	Conservative
43rd	2019–2021	Michael Barrett	Conservative
44th	2021–2025	Michael Barrett	Conservative
Leeds—Grenville—Thousand Islands—Rideau Lakes
45th	2025–present	Michael Barrett	Conservative

== Election results ==
Graph of election results in Leeds—Greenville—Thousand Islands and Rideau Lakes (minor parties that never got 2% of the vote or didn't run consistently are omitted)

2025 Canadian federal election
Party	Candidate	Votes	%	±%	Expenditures
Conservative	Michael Barrett	33,437	50.0	–0.48	
Liberal	Lorna Jean Edmonds	29,656	44.4	+19.19	
New Democratic	Paul Lancione	2,341	3.5	–11.45	
Green	Randi Ramdeen	781	1.2	–2.43	
People's	Hailey Simpson	596	0.9	–4.84	
Total valid votes		66,811	99.5		
Total rejected ballots		356	0.5		
Turnout		67,167	74.2	+5.7	
Eligible voters		90,557			
Conservative hold		Swing		–9.84	
Source: Elections Canada

2021 Canadian federal election
Party	Candidate	Votes	%	±%	Expenditures
Conservative	Michael Barrett	29,950	50.53	+1.5	$69,700.58
Liberal	Roberta L. Abbott	14,935	25.20	-1.3	$50,514.06
New Democratic	Michelle Taylor	8,863	14.95	+1.0	$8,264.09
People's	Alex Cassell	3,394	5.73	+4.0	$14,874.54
Green	Lorraine Rekmans	2,134	3.60	-5.2	$9,291.93
Total valid votes/expense limit		59,276	99.36	–	$116,064.78
Total rejected ballots		380	0.64		
Turnout		59,656	68.17		
Eligible voters		87,508			
Source: Elections Canada

2019 Canadian federal election: Leeds—Grenville—Thousand Islands and Rideau Lakes
Party	Candidate	Votes	%	±%	Expenditures
Conservative	Michael Barrett	28,630	48.98	-8.85	$52,413.10
Liberal	Josh Bennett	15,482	26.49	-9.32	$48,972.84
New Democratic	Michelle Taylor	8,201	14.03	+11	$4,315.07
Green	Lorraine Rekmans	5,152	8.81	+5.86	none listed
People's	Evan Hindle	988	1.69		none listed
Total valid votes/expense limit		58,453	100.0		
Total rejected ballots		479			
Turnout		58,932	69.8		
Eligible voters		84,442			
Conservative hold		Swing		+0.24	
Source: Elections Canada

Canadian federal by-election, 3 December 2018 Death of Gord Brown
Party	Candidate	Votes	%	±%	Expenditures
Conservative	Michael Barrett	16,865	57.83	+10.46	
Liberal	Mary Jean McFall	10,443	35.81	-4.74	
New Democratic	Michelle Taylor	883	3.03	-5.34	
Green	Lorraine Rekmans	859	2.95	-0.75	
Independent	John Turmel	111	0.38		
Total valid votes/expense limit		29,161	100.00		
Total rejected ballots					
Turnout			35.89	-35.18	
Eligible voters		81,247			
Conservative hold		Swing		+7.60	

2015 Canadian federal election
Party	Candidate	Votes	%	±%	Expenditures
Conservative	Gord Brown	26,738	47.38	-13.43	$118,628.90
Liberal	Mary Jean McFall	22,888	40.56	+24.66	$98,777.41
New Democratic	Margaret Andrade	4,722	8.37	-9.95	$5,647.96
Green	Lorraine A. Rekmans	2,088	3.70	-1.29	$6,935.40
Total valid votes/expense limit		56,436	100.00		$213,643.31
Total rejected ballots		189	0.33	–	
Turnout		56,625	71.08	–	
Eligible voters		79,669			
Conservative hold		Swing		-19.04	
Source: Elections Canada

2011 federal election redistributed results
Party	Vote	%
Conservative	29,989	60.80
New Democratic	9,032	18.31
Liberal	7,839	15.89
Green	2,460	4.99

2011 Canadian federal election
Party	Candidate	Votes	%	±%	Expenditures
Conservative	Gordon Brown	29,991	60.81	+2.36	$69,695
New Democratic	Matthew Gabriel	9,033	18.31	+4.46	$5,092
Liberal	Marjory Loveys	7,839	15.89	-1.29	$52,628
Green	Mary Slade	2,460	4.99	-4.63	$17,743
Total valid votes/expense limit		49,323	100.00		$145,158
Total rejected ballots		156	0.32	-0.08	
Turnout		49,479	64.42	+1.56	
Eligible voters		76,802	–	–	
Conservative hold		Swing		-1.05	

2008 Canadian federal election
Party	Candidate	Votes	%	±%	Expenditures
Conservative	Gord Brown	27,473	58.44	+3.80	$55,637
Liberal	Marjory Loveys	8,075	17.18	-7.14	$31,418
New Democratic	Steve Armstrong	6,511	13.85	-1.41	$6,532
Green	Jeanie Warnock	4,522	9.62	+3.85	$10,790
Progressive Canadian	John McCrea	426	0.91	*	$291
Total valid votes/expense limit		47,007	100.00		$104,668
Rejected ballots		186	0.39	+0.09	
Turnout		47,193	62.86	-7.65	
Eligible voters		75,075	–	–	
Conservative hold		Swing		+5.47	

2006 Canadian federal election
Party	Candidate	Votes	%	±%	Expenditures
Conservative	Gord Brown	28,447	54.65	+4.18	$69,350
Liberal	Bob Eaton	12,661	24.32	-8.61	$28,806
New Democratic	Steve Armstrong	7,945	15.26	+3.94	$7,043
Green	David Lee	3,003	5.77	+0.49	$450
Total valid votes		52,056	100.00		
Rejected ballots		159	0.30	-0.06	
Turnout		52,215	70.51	+0.13	
Eligible voters		74,055	–	–	
Conservative hold		Swing		+6.39	

2004 Canadian federal election
Party	Candidate	Votes	%	±%	Expenditures
Conservative	Gord Brown	26,002	50.46	-5.80	$69,173
Liberal	Joe Jordan	16,967	32.93	-6.58	$60,373
New Democratic	Steve Armstrong	5,834	11.32	+9.22	$10,009
Green	Chris Bradshaw	2,722	5.28	+3.55	$532
Total valid votes		51,525	100.00		
Conservative notional hold		Swing		+0.39	

Note: Conservative vote is compared to the total of the Canadian Alliance vote and Progressive Conservative vote in 2000 election.

2000 Canadian federal election
Party	Candidate	Votes	%	±%	Expenditures
Liberal	Joe Jordan	18,594	39.51	+0.04	$52,586
Alliance	Gord Brown	18,539	39.39	+17.77	$61,645
Progressive Conservative	John Johnston	7,940	16.87	-15.40	$55,627
New Democratic	Martin Hanratty	990	2.10	-1.52	$1,764
Green	Jerry Heath	816	1.73	-0.54	$3,302
Canadian Action	Jane Pamela Scharf	181	0.38	*	$0
Total valid votes		47,060	100.00		
Liberal hold		Swing		-8.86	

Note: Canadian Alliance vote is compared to the Reform vote in 1997 election.

1997 Canadian federal election
Party	Candidate	Votes	%	±%	Expenditures
Liberal	Joe Jordan	19,123	39.47	-13.10	$48,446
Progressive Conservative	Sandra Lawn	15,636	32.27	+5.34	$58,733
Reform	Doug Aldridge	10,476	21.62	+5.65	$18,190
New Democratic	Jennifer Breakspear	1,757	3.63	+1.60	$3,522
Green	Peter Bevan-Baker	1,102	2.27	+1.21	$1,427
Christian Heritage	Donny F. Platt	241	0.50	*	$544
Natural Law	Wayne Foster	119	0.25	-0.14	$0
Total valid votes		48,454	100.00		
Liberal hold		Swing		-9.22	

1993 Canadian federal election
Party	Candidate	Votes	%	±%	Expenditures
Liberal	Jim Jordan	26,567	52.57	+9.17	$49,114
Progressive Conservative	Sandra Lawn	13,608	26.93	-11.97	$53,521
Reform	Paul West	8,071	15.97	*	$8,164
New Democratic	Mary Ann Greenwood	1,026	2.03	-9.05	$6,686
Green	Peter Bevan-Baker	538	1.06	*	$0
National	Holly Baker	474	0.94	*	$490
Natural Law	Richard Beecroft	196	0.39	*	$0
Abolitionist	Christine Richardson	59	0.12	*	$200
Total valid votes		50,539	100.00		
Liberal hold		Swing		+10.57	

1988 Canadian federal election
Party	Candidate	Votes	%	±%
Liberal	Jim Jordan	20,141	43.39	+20.08
Progressive Conservative	Jennifer Cossitt	18,053	38.89	-22.60
New Democratic	Barry Grills	5,141	11.08	-2.89
Christian Heritage	David Butcher	1,584	3.41	
Confederation of Regions	Faye Garner	1,497	3.23	
Total valid votes		46,416	100.00	
Liberal gain from Progressive Conservative		Swing		+20.08

1984 Canadian federal election
Party	Candidate	Votes	%	±%
Progressive Conservative	Jennifer Cossitt	26,961	61.50	+10.28
Liberal	Chuck Anderson	10,222	23.32	-8.40
New Democratic	Jan Allen	6,121	13.96	-3.11
Green	Mike Nickerson	348	0.79	
Libertarian	Hans Wienhold	190	0.43	
Total valid votes		43,842	100.00	
Progressive Conservative hold		Swing		+9.34

^ Change is from 1980

Canadian federal by-election, 12 October 1982
Party	Candidate	Votes	%	±%
upon Tom Cossitt's death on 15 March 1982
Progressive Conservative	Jennifer Cossitt	18,401	57.00	+5.79
Liberal	Chuck Anderson	6,693	20.73	-10.98
Libertarian	Neil Reynolds	4,337	13.44	
New Democratic	Milred Smith	2,751	8.52	-8.55
Independent	Ray Turmel	99	0.31	
Total valid votes		32,281	100.00	
Progressive Conservative hold		Swing		+8.38

1980 Canadian federal election
Party	Candidate	Votes	%	±%
Progressive Conservative	Tom Cossitt	19,800	51.22	-5.59
Liberal	Gerry McKee	12,260	31.71	+3.94
New Democratic	Mildred Smith	6,600	17.07	+1.65
Total valid votes		38,660	100.00	
Progressive Conservative hold		Swing		-4.76

1979 Canadian federal election
Party	Candidate	Votes	%
Progressive Conservative	Tom Cossitt	24,127	56.80
Liberal	Gerry McKee	11,797	27.77
New Democratic	Mildred Smith	6,551	15.42
Total valid votes		42,475	100.00

== See also ==
- List of Canadian electoral districts
- Historical federal electoral districts of Canada
