= List of members of the Canadian House of Commons with military service (S) =

Military service house members

Name	Elected party	Constituency	Elected date	Military service
Max Saltsman	New Democrat	Waterloo South	November 9, 1964	Royal Canadian Air Force (1941–1945)
Joseph Reeds Sams	Progressive Conservative	Wentworth	June 18, 1962	Canadian Army (1943–1946)
Frederick George Sanderson	Liberal	Perth South	October 29, 1925	Canadian Army
Edmond Savard	Liberal	Chicoutimi—Saguenay	December 17, 1917	Militia (1885)
Frederick Laurence Schaffner	Conservative	Souris	November 3, 1904	Canadian Army
Norman C. Schneider	Liberal	Waterloo North	May 26, 1952	Canadian Army (1915–1916)
Edward Richard Schreyer	New Democrat	Springfield	November 8, 1965	Canadian Army (1954–1956)
James Duncan Schroder	Liberal	Guelph	February 18, 1980	Canadian Army (1942–1946)
Stanley Stanford Schumacher	Progressive Conservative	Palliser	June 25, 1968	Canadian Army (1958–1962)
Thomas Scott	Conservative	Selkirk	September 10, 1880	Militia (1870–1873)
Joseph Pierre Albert Sévigny	Progressive Conservative	Longueuil	March 31, 1958	Canadian Army
Samuel Simpson Sharpe	Conservative	Ontario North	October 26, 1908	Canadian Army (1916–1917)
William Henry Sharpe	Conservative	Lisgar	October 26, 1908	Canadian Army (1916-)
Joseph Tweed Shaw	Labour	Calgary West	December 6, 1921	Canadian Army (1916–1918)
Bud Sherman	Progressive Conservative	Winnipeg South	November 8, 1965	Canadian Army (1947–1949)
Jack Shields	Progressive Conservative	Athabaska	February 18, 1980	Canadian Army (1947–1957)
Yuri Shymko	Progressive Conservative	Parkdale	October 16, 1978	Royal Canadian Air Cadets
Georges-Honoré Simard	Conservative	Quebec-Centre	September 20, 1867	Militia
James Aubrey Simmons	Liberal	Yukon—Mackenzie River	June 27, 1949	Canadian Army (1916–1919)
Wemyss Mackenzie Simpson	Conservative	Algoma	September 20, 1867	Militia (1870–1879)
Duncan James Sinclair	Liberal	Oxford North	December 6, 1921	Canadian Army
James Sinclair	Liberal	Vancouver North	March 26, 1940	Royal Canadian Air Force (1939–1945)
Lawrence Wilton Skey	Progressive Conservative	Trinity	June 11, 1945	Royal Canadian Air Force (1939–1944)
James Atchison Skinner	Liberal	Oxford South	May 23, 1874	Militia (1866–1886)
Arthur Ryan Smith	Progressive Conservative	Calgary South	June 10, 1957	Royal Canadian Air Force
Donald Alexander Smith	Independent Conservative	Selkirk	March 2, 1871	Militia (1898-)
G.A. Percy Smith	Liberal	Northumberland—Miramichi	June 15, 1968	Canadian Army (1942–1946)
Herber Edgar Smith	Progressive Conservative	Simcoe North	June 10, 1957	Canadian Army (1941–1946)
John Smith	Progressive Conservative	Lincoln	June 10, 1957	Canadian Army (1914–1919)
Robert Smith	Liberal	Stormont	October 26, 1908	Canadian Army
William Ross Smyth	Conservative	Algoma East	October 26, 1908	Canadian Army
James Stanley Speakman	Progressive Conservative	Wetaskiwin	March 31, 1958	Canadian Army
Alexander Sproat	Conservative	Bruce North	September 20, 1867	Militia (1871–1881)
Gerry St. Germain	Progressive Conservative	Mission—Port Moody	August 29, 1983	Royal Canadian Air Force
Harold Edwin Stafford	Liberal	Elgin	November 8, 1865	Royal Canadian Air Force (1941–1945)
John Stanfield	Conservative	Colchester	November 28, 1907	Canadian Army (1917-)
Louis St. Marie	Liberal	Napierville	February 22, 1887	Militia (1866–1900)
George McClellan Stearns	Progressive Conservative	Compton—Frontenac	March 31, 1958	Canadian Army (1939–1941)
Alan Carl Stewart	Liberal	Yorkton	June 27, 1949	Canadian Army
John Smith Stewart	Conservative	Lethbridge	July 28, 1930	Militia, Canadian Army
Ralph Wesley Stewart	Liberal	Cochrane	June 25, 1968	Royal Canadian Air Force (1952–1958)
Leonard T. Stick	Liberal	Trinity—Conception	June 27, 1949	Royal Newfoundland Regiment (1914–1918)
Frederick Coles Stinson	Progressive Conservative	York Centre	June 10, 1957	Royal Canadian Navy (1943–1945)
Bernard Munroe Stitt	Conservative	Nelson	July 28, 1930	Canadian Army
James Herbert Stitt	Conservative	Selkirk	July 28, 1930	Canadian Army
Frederick William Strange	Liberal-Conservative	York North	September 17, 1878	Militia (1893–1896)
Thomas Clark Street	Conservative	Welland	September 20, 1867	Militia (1855–1869)
John Everett Lyle Streight	Liberal	York West	October 14, 1935	Militia (1899–1906), Canadian Army (1914–1931)
David Stupich	New Democrat	Nanaimo—Cowichan	November 21, 1988	Royal Canadian Air Force (1938–1945)
Donald Matheson Sutherland	Conservative	Oxford North	October 29, 1925	Canadian Army
