= Oxford (federal electoral district) =

Federal electoral district in Ontario, Canada

Coordinates: 43.06°N 80.6°W

Ontario electoral district
- Interactive map of riding boundaries from the 2025 federal election

Federal electoral district
- Legislature: House of Commons
MP
Arpan Khanna
Conservative
- District created: 1933
- First contested: 1935
- Last contested: 2025 federal election
- District webpage: profile, map

Demographics
- Population (2011): 108,656
- Electors (2015): 83,003
- Area (km²): 2,384
- Pop. density (per km²): 45.6
- Census division(s): Brant County, Oxford County
- Census subdivision(s): Woodstock, Tillsonburg, Ingersoll, Norwich, Zorra, East Zorra – Tavistock, South-West Oxford, Blandford-Blenheim

Oxford is a federal electoral district in Ontario, Canada, that has been represented in the House of Commons of Canada since the 1935 election.

== Demographics ==
According to the 2021 Canadian census

Ethnic groups: 90.2% White, 3.2% South Asian, 2.3% Indigenous, 1.4% Black
Languages: 89.2% English, 1.8% Dutch, 1.5% Punjabi, 1.2% French, 1.2% German
Religions: 56.7% Christian (17.2% Catholic, 9.3% United Church, 5.0% Anglican, 3.1% Baptist, 2.8% Reformed, 2.6% Presbyterian, 1.6% Lutheran, 1.5% Anabaptist, 1.0% Pentecostal and other Charismatic, 12.6% Other), 1.7% Sikh, 39.4% None
Median income: $42,800 (2020)
Average income: $50,760 (2020)

== Geography ==
The riding consists of the County of Oxford and a small portion of the County of Brant, covering most of the former Burford Township.

In the 2021 and 2019 elections, the Conservatives have won all parts of the riding, but were particularly strong in the rural southern part of the riding, with Burford Township and Norwich being their strongest areas. The weakest part of the riding for the Tories was in the riding's urban centres of Tillsonburg, Woodstock and Ingersoll where they only won pluralities. Liberal support is generally weak across the riding, but is the strongest in Woodstock and Tillsonburg, while the NDP has done particularly well in Ingersoll, winning over a quarter of the vote there in both elections. The People's Party saw a significant increase in their vote in 2021, with their strongest part of the riding being in Norwich.

== History ==
It was created in 1933 when the ridings of Oxford North and Oxford South were merged. It consisted initially of the county of Oxford, including the part of the village of Tavistock that lies in the county of Oxford.

In 1966, it was expanded to include the whole of the Village of Tavistock and the Town of Tillsonburg. In 1987, it was expanded to include the Township of Burford in the County of Brant. In 1996, it reverted to consisting of just the county of Oxford.

This riding gained territory from Brant during the 2012 electoral redistribution, consisting of that part of the County of Brant west of Etonia Road and East Quarter Townline Road.

== Members of Parliament ==
Parliament	Years	Member	Party
Oxford; Riding created from Oxford North and Oxford South
18th	1935–1940	Almon Rennie	Liberal
19th	1940–1945	Almon Rennie	Liberal
20th	1945–1949	Kenneth Daniel	Progressive Conservative
21st	1949–1953	Clark Murray	Liberal
22nd	1953–1957	Wally Nesbitt	Progressive Conservative
23rd	1957–1958	Wally Nesbitt	Progressive Conservative
24th	1958–1962	Wally Nesbitt	Progressive Conservative
25th	1962–1963	Wally Nesbitt	Progressive Conservative
26th	1963–1965	Wally Nesbitt	Progressive Conservative
27th	1965–1968	Wally Nesbitt	Progressive Conservative
28th	1968–1972	Wally Nesbitt	Progressive Conservative
29th	1972–1974	Wally Nesbitt	Progressive Conservative
30th	1974–1979	Bruce Halliday	Progressive Conservative
31st	1979–1980	Bruce Halliday	Progressive Conservative
32nd	1980–1984	Bruce Halliday	Progressive Conservative
33rd	1984–1988	Bruce Halliday	Progressive Conservative
34th	1988–1993	Bruce Halliday	Progressive Conservative
35th	1993–1997	John Baird Finlay	Liberal
36th	1997–2000	John Baird Finlay	Liberal
37th	2000–2004	John Baird Finlay	Liberal
38th	2004–2006	Dave MacKenzie	Conservative
39th	2006–2008	Dave MacKenzie	Conservative
40th	2008–2011	Dave MacKenzie	Conservative
41st	2011–2015	Dave MacKenzie	Conservative
42nd	2015–2019	Dave MacKenzie	Conservative
43rd	2019–2021	Dave MacKenzie	Conservative
44th	2021–2023	Dave MacKenzie	Conservative
44th	2023–2025	Arpan Khanna	Conservative
45th	2025–present	Arpan Khanna	Conservative

== Election results ==
View source data.
Graph of election results in Oxford (parties that never received at least 2% of the vote are omitted)

2025 Canadian federal election
** Preliminary results — Not yet official **
Party	Candidate	Votes	%	±%	Expenditures
Conservative	Arpan Khanna	38,132	53.14	+6.35	
Liberal	David Hilderley	27,243	37.97	+17.30	
New Democratic	Matthew Chambers	3,134	4.37	–14.07	
Christian Heritage	Jacob Watson	1,203	1.68	+0.92	
Green	Cheryle Baker	1,061	1.48	–1.22	
People's	Steven Beausoleil	637	0.89	–9.75	
United	Melanie Van Brugge	239	0.33	N/A	
Independent	Akshay Varun Raj Vardhan	109	0.15	N/A	
Total valid votes/expense limit					
Total rejected ballots					
Turnout		71,758	71.85		
Eligible voters		99,871			
Conservative notional hold		Swing		–10.95	
Source: Elections Canada
Note: Change in percentage value and swing are calculated from the redistributed results of the 2021 general election, not the June 2023 by-election.

2021 federal election redistributed results
Party	Vote	%
Conservative	28,222	46.79
Liberal	12,471	20.67
New Democratic	11,124	18.44
People's	6,418	10.64
Green	1,629	2.70
Others	457	0.76

Canadian federal by-election, June 19, 2023 Resignation of Dave MacKenzie
Party	Candidate	Votes	%	±%
Conservative	Arpan Khanna	16,688	42.92	-4.13
Liberal	David Hilderley	14,164	36.43	+15.90
New Democratic	Cody Groat	4,053	10.42	-7.86
Christian Heritage	John Markus	1,672	4.30	+3.53
People's	Wendy Martin	1,278	3.29	-7.36
Green	Cheryle Baker	854	2.20	-0.52
Independent	John The Engineer Turmel	171	0.44	
Total valid votes		38,880	99.38	
Total rejected ballots		243	0.62	+0.01
Turnout		39,123	39.81	-25.08
Eligible voters		98,270		
Conservative hold		Swing		-10.01
Source: Elections Canada

2021 Canadian federal election
Party	Candidate	Votes	%	±%	Expenditures
Conservative	Dave MacKenzie	29,146	47.05	-1.09	$32,605.67
Liberal	Elizabeth Quinto	12,720	20.53	+1.24	$25,550.39
New Democratic	Matthew Chambers	11,325	18.28	-1.93	$3,373.85
People's	Wendy Martin	6,595	10.65	+7.73	$15,390.08
Green	Bob Reid	1,683	2.72	-5.12	$0.00
Christian Heritage	Allen Scovil	479	0.77	-0.85	$5,613.11
Total valid votes/expense limit		61,948	99.39	–	$123,152.84
Total rejected ballots		379	0.61	-0.25	
Turnout		62,327	64.89	-1.04	
Eligible voters		96,055			
Conservative hold		Swing		-1.17	
Source: Elections Canada

2019 Canadian federal election
Party	Candidate	Votes	%	±%	Expenditures
Conservative	Dave MacKenzie	29,310	48.14	+2.46	$49,710.46
New Democratic	Matthew Chambers	12,306	20.21	+3.66	none listed
Liberal	Brendan Knight	11,745	19.29	-12.90	$3,866.13
Green	Lisa Birtch-Carriere	4,770	7.83	+4.31	none listed
People's	Wendy Martin	1,774	2.91	-	$6,624.90
Christian Heritage	Melody Aldred	986	1.62	-0.45	$3,632.07
Total valid votes/expense limit		60,891	99.14	–	
Total rejected ballots		528	0.86	+0.44	
Turnout		61,419	65.92	-2.00	
Eligible voters		93,166			
Conservative hold		Swing		-0.60	
Source: Elections Canada

2015 Canadian federal election
Party	Candidate	Votes	%	±%	Expenditures
Conservative	Dave MacKenzie	25,966	45.67	-13.30	$75,795.63
Liberal	Don McKay	18,299	32.19	+22.55	$36,173.57
New Democratic	Zoe Kunschner	9,406	16.55	-8.90	$25,490.22
Green	Mike Farlow	2,004	3.53	-0.80	$4,354.32
Christian Heritage	Melody Ann Aldred	1,175	2.07		$8,421.76
Total valid votes/Expense limit		56,850	99.58		$220,586.55
Total rejected ballots		241	0.42	–	
Turnout		57,041	67.93		
Eligible voters		84,045			
Conservative hold		Swing		-17.92	
Source: Elections Canada

2011 federal election redistributed results
Party	Vote	%
Conservative	28,782	58.97
New Democratic	12,419	25.45
Liberal	4,706	9.64
Green	2,111	4.33
Others	786	1.61

2011 Canadian federal election
Party	Candidate	Votes	%	±%	Expenditures
Conservative	Dave MacKenzie	27,973	58.90	+6.22	$56,267
New Democratic	Paul Arsenault	12,164	25.61	+7.59	$14,065
Liberal	Tim Lobzun	4,521	9.52	-9.87	$13,495
Green	Mike Farlow	2,058	4.33	-3.24	$12,611
Christian Heritage	John Markus	776	1.63	-0.71	$1,478
Total valid votes/Expense limit		47,492	99.62		$85,881.86
Total rejected ballots		179	0.38	+0.05	
Turnout		47,671	61.88	+2.87	
Eligible voters		77,035	–	–	
Conservative hold		Swing		-0.68	

2008 Canadian federal election
Party	Candidate	Votes	%	±%	Expenditures
Conservative	Dave MacKenzie	23,330	52.68	+6.13	$57,473
Liberal	Martha Dennis	8,586	19.39	-8.70	$50,017
New Democratic	Diane Abbott	7,982	18.02	+0.65	$9,242
Green	Cathy Mott	3,355	7.58	+4.43	$2,819
Christian Heritage	Shaun MacDonald	1,036	2.34	-0.55	$14,229
Total valid votes/Expense limit		44,289	99.67	$82,866	
Total rejected ballots		145	0.33	-0.00	
Turnout		44,434	59.02	-8.12	
Eligible voters		75,290	–	–	
Conservative hold		Swing		+7.41	

2006 Canadian federal election
Party	Candidate	Votes	%	±%
Conservative	Dave MacKenzie	23,140	46.55	+1.65
Liberal	Greig Mordue	13,961	28.08	-2.44
New Democratic	Zoe Kunschner	8,639	17.38	+2.84
Green	Ronnee Sykes	1,566	3.15	-1.10
Christian Heritage	John Markus	1,434	2.88	-0.46
Marijuana	James Bender	771	1.55	-0.18
Libertarian	Kaye Sargent	204	0.41	-0.08
Total valid votes		49,715	99.67	
Total rejected ballots		164	0.33	-0.13
Turnout		49,879	67.14	+4.01
Eligible voters		74,292	–	–
Conservative hold		Swing		+2.05

2004 Canadian federal election
Party	Candidate	Votes	%	±%
Conservative	Dave MacKenzie	20,606	44.89	-12.59
Liberal	Murray Coulter	14,011	30.52	-4.91
New Democratic	Zoe Kunschner	6,673	14.54	+9.25
Green	Irene Tietz	1,951	4.25	
Christian Heritage	Leslie Bartley	1,534	3.34	
Marijuana	James Bender	794	1.73	
Libertarian	Kaye Sargent	226	0.49	
Canadian Action	Alex Kreider	108	0.24	
Total valid votes		45,903	99.54	
Total rejected ballots		211	0.46	
Turnout		46,114	63.13	
Eligible voters		73,048	–	–
Conservative notional hold		Swing		-3.84

Note: Change is from 2000 redistributed results. Conservative vote is compared to the combined Canadian Alliance and Progressive Conservative vote.

2000 federal election redistributed results
Party	Vote	%
Liberal	14,869	35.44
Progressive Conservative	12,834	30.59
Canadian Alliance	11,283	26.89
New Democratic	2,219	5.29
Others	755	1.80

2000 Canadian federal election
Party	Candidate	Votes	%	±%
Liberal	John Baird Finlay	15,181	35.55	-0.43
Progressive Conservative	Dave MacKenzie	13,050	30.56	-1.94
Alliance	Patricia Smith	11,455	26.82	+5.76
New Democratic	Shawn Rouse	2,254	5.28	-2.25
Independent	John Thomas Markus (Note: Markus was a member of the Christian Heritage Party, which was unregistered at the time)	536	1.26	-0.86
Canadian Action	Alex Kreider	227	0.53	+0.11
Total valid votes		42,703	100.0	
Liberal hold		Swing		+0.76

Note: Canadian Alliance vote is compared to the Reform vote in 1997 election. Independent compared to Christian Heritage.

1997 Canadian federal election
Party	Candidate	Votes	%	±%
Liberal	John Baird Finlay	16,281	35.98	-5.15
Progressive Conservative	Dave MacKenzie	14,706	32.50	+9.79
Reform	Bill Irvine	9,533	21.07	-5.39
New Democratic	Martin Donlevy	3,406	7.53	+2.55
Christian Heritage	John Zekveld	956	2.11	+0.16
Canadian Action	Alex Kreider	192	0.42	
Natural Law	Jim Morris	181	0.40	-0.05
Total valid votes		45,255	100.0	
Liberal hold		Swing		-7.47

1993 Canadian federal election
Party	Candidate	Votes	%	±%
Liberal	John Baird Finlay	19,669	41.13	+4.11
Reform	John Mohr	12,653	26.46	
Progressive Conservative	George Klosler	10,857	22.70	-17.05
New Democratic	Martin Donlevy	2,380	4.98	-10.98
Christian Heritage	Hans Strikwerda	935	1.96	-4.59
Independent	George Moore	471	0.98	
National	Bryan John Rahn	417	0.87	
Libertarian	Kaye Sargent	230	0.48	+0.10
Natural Law	Peter Leggat	214	0.45	
Total valid votes		47,826	100.0	
Liberal gain from Progressive Conservative		Swing		+10.58

1988 Canadian federal election
Party	Candidate	Votes	%	±%
Progressive Conservative	Bruce Halliday	19,367	39.75	-17.3
Liberal	Alfred Apps	18,035	37.02	+8.3
New Democratic	Brian Donlevy	7,771	15.95	+2.4
Christian Heritage	Hans Strikwerda	3,190	6.55	
Libertarian	Kaye Sargent	187	0.38	-0.3
Commonwealth of Canada	Sharon Rounds	166	0.34	
Total valid votes		48,716	100.0	

1984 Canadian federal election
Party	Candidate	Votes	%	±%
Progressive Conservative	Bruce Halliday	25,642	57.1	+11.2
Liberal	Alfred Apps	12,884	28.7	-8.1
New Democratic	Wayne Colbran	6,077	13.5	-2.8
Libertarian	Kaye Sargent	322	0.7	0.0
Total valid votes		44,925	100.0	

1980 Canadian federal election
Party	Candidate	Votes	%	±%
Progressive Conservative	Bruce Halliday	19,382	45.9	-9.3
Liberal	Ken Peers	15,546	36.8	+6.5
New Democratic	Marjorie Lanaway	6,885	16.3	+2.3
Libertarian	Nancy Hurd	311	0.7	+0.2
Marxist–Leninist	Larry Hannant	100	0.2	
Total valid votes		42,224	100.0	

1979 Canadian federal election
Party	Candidate	Votes	%	±%
Progressive Conservative	Bruce Halliday	23,592	55.2	+8.8
Liberal	Ron Calhoun	12,935	30.3	-12.6
New Democratic	Marjorie Lanaway	5,980	14.0	+3.2
Libertarian	Nancy Hurd	227	0.5	
Total valid votes		42,734	100.0	

1974 Canadian federal election
Party	Candidate	Votes	%	±%
Progressive Conservative	Bruce Halliday	18,934	46.4	-16.2
Liberal	Charlie Tatham	17,506	42.9	+12.0
New Democratic	Peter Klynstra	4,398	10.8	+4.1
Total valid votes		40,838	100.0	

1972 Canadian federal election
Party	Candidate	Votes	%	±%
Progressive Conservative	Wally Nesbitt	25,438	62.5	+9.0
Liberal	Charlie Tatham	12,540	30.8	-5.9
New Democratic	Ron Wettlaufer	2,703	6.6	-3.0
Total valid votes		40,681	100.0	

1968 Canadian federal election
Party	Candidate	Votes	%	±%
Progressive Conservative	Wally Nesbitt	18,504	53.6	-2.1
Liberal	Charlie Tatham	12,697	36.8	+4.6
New Democratic	John Hilborn	3,335	9.7	-2.5
Total valid votes		34,536	100.0	

1965 Canadian federal election
Party	Candidate	Votes	%	±%
Progressive Conservative	Wally Nesbitt	17,657	55.6	-4.8
Liberal	Leslie MacDonald Ball	10,202	32.2	-0.1
New Democratic	Margaret Caffyn	3,870	12.2	+7.4
Total valid votes		31,729	100.0	

1963 Canadian federal election
Party	Candidate	Votes	%	±%
Progressive Conservative	Wally Nesbitt	19,402	60.4	+2.6
Liberal	William Young	10,359	32.3	-1.6
New Democratic	Wilf Vale	1,550	4.8	-1.2
Social Credit	Margaret Elsom	805	2.5	+0.2
Total valid votes		32,116	100.0	

1962 Canadian federal election
Party	Candidate	Votes	%	±%
Progressive Conservative	Wally Nesbitt	18,352	57.8	-17.3
Liberal	Robert Alan MacDougall	10,731	33.8	+9.0
New Democratic	Wilf Vale	1,918	6.0	
Social Credit	Charles Elsom	735	2.3	
Total valid votes		31,736	100.0	

1958 Canadian federal election
Party	Candidate	Votes	%	±%
Progressive Conservative	Wally Nesbitt	22,079	75.1	+6.3
Liberal	Hector Alexander Clark	7,305	24.9	+74.8
Total valid votes		29,384	100.0	

1957 Canadian federal election
Party	Candidate	Votes	%	±%
Progressive Conservative	Wally Nesbitt	20,404	68.9	+18.8
Liberal	Bruce McCall	8,275	27.9	
Social Credit	Charlie Elsom	944	3.2	
Total valid votes		29,623	100.0	

1953 Canadian federal election
Party	Candidate	Votes	%	±%
Progressive Conservative	Wally Nesbitt	12,693	50.1	+4.8
Liberal	Alexander Clark Murray	12,654	49.9	+1.6
Total valid votes		25,347	100.0	

1949 Canadian federal election
Party	Candidate	Votes	%	±%
Liberal	Alexander Clark Murray	12,581	48.3	+6.6
Progressive Conservative	Kenneth Daniel	11,791	45.2	-3.6
Co-operative Commonwealth	William Gordon Goodwin	1,688	6.5	
Total valid votes		26,060	100.0	

1945 Canadian federal election
Party	Candidate	Votes	%	±%
Progressive Conservative	Kenneth Daniel	11,916	48.9	+5.8
Liberal	Almon Secord Rennie	10,149	41.6	-15.2
Co-operative Commonwealth	Ralph Burton	2,310	9.5	
Total valid votes		24,375	100.0	

Note: Progressive Conservative vote is compared to "National Government" vote in 1940 election.

1940 Canadian federal election
Party	Candidate	Votes	%	±%
Liberal	Almon Secord Rennie	10,975	56.9	+9.1
National Government	Charles Thomas Milton	8,325	43.1	+7.0
Total valid votes		19,300	100.0	

Note: "National Government" vote is compared to Conservative vote in 1935 election.

1935 Canadian federal election
Party	Candidate	Votes	%
Liberal	Almon Secord Rennie	11,438	47.8
Conservative	Donald Matheson Sutherland	8,655	36.2
Reconstruction	Richard Harley Mayberry	2,953	12.3
Co-operative Commonwealth	William Andrew MacLeod	886	3.7
Total valid votes		23,932	100.0

== Student Vote results ==
=== 2025 ===
2025 Canadian federal election
Party	Candidate	Votes	%
Conservative	Arpan Khanna	501	33.78
Liberal	David Hilderley	386	26.03
Green	Cheryle Baker	193	13.01
New Democratic	Matthew Chambers	191	12.88
Christian Heritage	Jacob Watson	142	9.58
People's	Steven Beausoleil	34	2.29
Independent	Akshay Varun Raj Vardhan	19	1.28
United	Melanie Van Brugge	17	1.15
Total votes		1,483	100
Source: Student Vote Canada

=== 2021 ===
2021 Canadian federal election
Party	Candidate	Votes	%
Conservative	Dave MacKenzie	649	28.55
New Democratic	Matthew Chambers	602	26.48
Liberal	Elizabeth Quinto	496	21.82
Green	Bob Reid	244	10.73
People's	Wendy Martin	208	9.15
Christian Heritage	Allen Scovil	74	3.26
Total votes		2,273	100
Source: Student Vote Canada

=== 2019 ===
2019 Canadian federal election
Party	Candidate	Votes	%
Conservative	Dave MacKenzie	892	29.78
New Democratic	Matthew Chambers	803	26.81
Green	Lisa Birtch-Carriere	551	18.40
Liberal	Brendan Knight	401	13.39
Christian Heritage	Melody Aldred	187	6.24
People's	Wendy Martin	161	5.38
Total votes		2,995	100
Source: Student Vote Canada

== See also ==
- List of Canadian electoral districts
- Historical federal electoral districts of Canada
