= Cody Groat =

Canadian historian

Cody Groat is a Canadian scholar and historian, who focuses on the federal commemoration of Indigenous history from 1919 to present. He is a Kanyen'kehaka citizen and band member of Six Nations of the Grand River.

== Early life ==
Cody grew up in Ingersoll, Ontario. His grandparents were survivors of the Canadian Indian residential school system, and his father a survivor of the Sixties Scoop.

== Education ==
Groat holds a Master of Arts in World Heritage Studies from the University of Birmingham and earned his PhD in History at Wilfrid Laurier University.

== Career ==
Early in his academic career, Groat published a compilation of more than 30 interviews with famous Canadians, including Paul Martin, Kim Campbell, Dan Aykroyd, and Farley Mowat. He is currently a professor at University of Western Ontario in the Department of History and the Indigenous Studies program As a historian and academic, Cody Groat has been interviewed in relation to Truth and Reconciliation in Canada by news outlets such as The New York Times, CBC News, and Global News. He is a former President of the Board of Directors for the Indigenous Heritage Circle and is currently Chair of the Canadian Commission for UNESCO's Memory of the World National Committee.

== Politics ==
Groat was the New Democratic Party candidate for the 2023 Oxford federal by-election, having defeated former candidate Matthew Chambers for the nomination.

== Electoral history ==
Canadian federal by-election, June 19, 2023: Oxford Resignation of Dave MacKenzie
Party	Candidate	Votes	%	±%
Conservative	Arpan Khanna	16,688	42.92	-4.13
Liberal	David Hilderley	14,164	36.43	+15.90
New Democratic	Cody Groat	4,053	10.42	-7.86
Christian Heritage	John Markus	1,672	4.30	+3.53
People's	Wendy Martin	1,278	3.29	-7.36
Green	Cheryle Baker	854	2.20	-0.52
Independent	John The Engineer Turmel	171	0.44	
Total valid votes		38,880	99.38	
Total rejected ballots		243	0.62	+0.01
Turnout		39,123	39.81	-25.08
Eligible voters		98,270		
Conservative hold		Swing		-10.01
Source: Elections Canada

== Awards ==
- 2022: Canadian Historical Association's Indigenous History Best Article Prize
- SSHRC Doctoral Fellowship, Social Sciences and Humanities Research Council of Canada (2019-2021)

== Publications ==
  - “Holding Place: Resistance, Reframing and Relationally in the Representation of Indigenous History,” with Kim Anderson, Historic Perspectives Dossier on Commemoration for The Canadian Historical Review, 2021, Vol. 102 (03), pp. 465–484.
  - “Commemoration and Reconciliation: The Mohawk Institute as a World Heritage Site,” British Journal of Canadian Studies, 2018, Vol. 31 (2), pp. 195–208.
  - Canadian Stories: A Teenaged Adventure with Presidents, Drag Queens and Drug Lords (Rapido Books, 2016)
  - “Indigenous Peoples and the UNESCO Memory of the World Programme,” Canadian Commission for UNESCO IdeaLabs Policy Paper, forthcoming.
