= 2023 Oxford federal by-election =

Federal by-election in Ontario, Canada

- June 19, 2023

Riding of Oxford
- Turnout: 39.81%
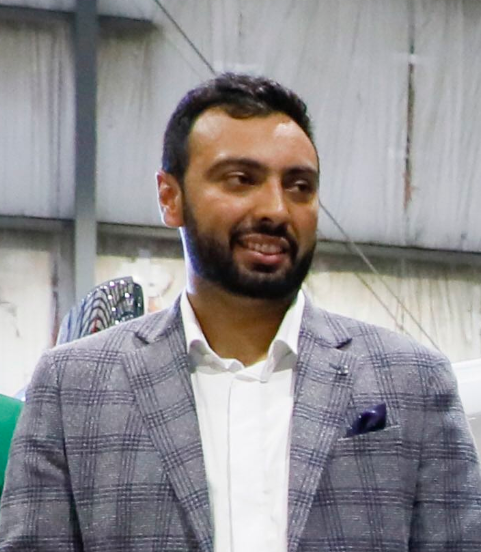
	First party	Second party	Third party
		LPC	NDP
Candidate	Arpan Khanna	David Hilderley	Cody Groat
Party	Conservative	Liberal	New Democratic
Popular vote	16,688	14,164	4,053
Percentage	42.92%	36.43%	10.42%
Swing	▼4.13%	▲15.90%	▼7.86%
MP before election
Dave MacKenzie
Conservative
Elected MP
Arpan Khanna
Conservative

A by-election was held in the federal riding of Oxford in Ontario on June 19, 2023, following the resignation of Conservative MP Dave MacKenzie.

The by-election was held on the same day as three others; Notre-Dame-de-Grâce—Westmount, Portage—Lisgar and Winnipeg South Centre.

== Background ==
=== Constituency ===
The electoral district is a mixed rural and urban constituency which covers Oxford County and a small portion of the County of Brant. The seat is generally considered safe for the Conservative Party, having voted Tory in every election since 1953, except for when the right was divided between 1993 and 2004.

=== Representation ===
The riding of Oxford was vacated on January 28, 2023, following the resignation of Conservative MP Dave MacKenzie, who had held the seat since 2004.

== Campaign ==
=== Candidates ===
Arpan Khanna, the party's national outreach chair and 2019 candidate in Brampton North defeated Woodstock city-county councillor Deb Tait, MacKenzie's daughter and former ministerial staffer Rick Roth for the Conservative nomination. Gerrit Van Dorland, executive assistant to Cypress Hills—Grasslands MP Jeremy Patzer was running for the nomination until he was disqualified by the Conservatives over a dispute about whether he disclosed information to the party. In February 2023, MacKenzie accused the party of supporting Khanna, which he argues is a violation of the party nomination rules based on the Conservative's code of conduct, during the race.

Running for the Liberals is local realtor, former educator, and past Woodstock mayoral candidate David Hilderley. Citing concerns with the Conservative nomination process, previous MP Dave MacKenzie endorsed Hilderley in April 2023.

Western University professor Cody Groat defeated Matthew Chambers, the party candidate for the riding in the 2019 and 2021 elections for the NDP nomination.

=== Polling ===
Polling Firm	Last Date of Polling	Link	CPC	LPC	NDP	PPC	GPC	Others	Undecided	Margin of Error^{[1]}	Sample Size^{[2]}	Polling Method^{[3]}
Mainstreet Research	June 14, 2023	HTML	36	36	7	5	4	7	5	±4.5 pp	473	IVR
Mainstreet Research	June 14, 2023	HTML	38	38	8	6	4	7	—N/a	±4.5 pp	473	IVR

== Results ==
Canadian federal by-election, June 19, 2023: Oxford Resignation of Dave MacKenzie
Party	Candidate	Votes	%	±%
Conservative	Arpan Khanna	16,688	42.92	-4.13
Liberal	David Hilderley	14,164	36.43	+15.90
New Democratic	Cody Groat	4,053	10.42	-7.86
Christian Heritage	John Markus	1,672	4.30	+3.53
People's	Wendy Martin	1,278	3.29	-7.36
Green	Cheryle Baker	854	2.20	-0.52
Independent	John The Engineer Turmel	171	0.44	
Total valid votes		38,880	99.38	
Total rejected ballots		243	0.62	+0.01
Turnout		39,123	39.81	-25.08
Eligible voters		98,270		
Conservative hold		Swing		-10.01
Source: Elections Canada

== 2021 results ==
2021 Canadian federal election
Party	Candidate	Votes	%	±%	Expenditures
Conservative	Dave MacKenzie	29,146	47.05	-1.09	
Liberal	Elizabeth Quinto	12,720	20.53	+1.24	
New Democratic	Matthew Chambers	11,325	18.28	-1.93	
People's	Wendy Martin	6,595	10.65	+7.73	
Green	Bob Reid	1,683	2.72	-5.12	
Christian Heritage	Allen Scovil	479	0.77	-0.85	
Total valid votes		61,948	99.39		
Total rejected ballots		379	0.61	-0.25	
Turnout		62,327	64.89	-1.04	
Eligible voters		96,055			
Conservative hold		Swing		-1.17	
Source: Elections Canada
