= Hugh Allan (disambiguation) =

Hugh Allan (1810–1882) was a Scottish-born Canadian shipping magnate.

Hugh Allan may also refer to:

- Hugh Allan (politician) (1865–1949), Liberal party member of the Canadian House of Commons
- H. Montagu Allan (1860–1951), Canadian banker, ship owner and sportsman
- Hugh Allan (actor) (1903–1997), American actor
- James Allan (bishop) (born Hugh James Pearson Allan, 1928–2013), Canadian Anglican bishop
- Hugh Allan (abbot) (born 1976), Roman Catholic apostolic administrator of the Falkland Islands and Titular Abbot of Beeleigh

== See also ==
- Hugh Allen (disambiguation)
