= Duncan James Sinclair =

Canadian politician

Member of Parliament for Oxford North
- In office December 1921 – October 1925
- Preceded by: Edward Walter Nesbitt
- Succeeded by: Donald Sutherland

Personal details
- Born: Duncan James Sinclair; 1 July 1867 Brooke Township, Ontario
- Died: 17 August 1943 (aged 76)
- Party: Liberal
- Profession: Physician

Duncan James Sinclair (1 July 1867 – 17 August 1943) was a Liberal party member of the House of Commons of Canada. He was born in Brooke Township, Ontario and became a physician.

He was elected to Parliament at the Oxford North riding in the 1921 general election. After serving his only federal term, the 14th Canadian Parliament, Sinclair was defeated in the 1925 federal election by Donald Sutherland of the Conservatives.
