= Gasoline Gus (comic) =

American comic strip by O.P. Williams

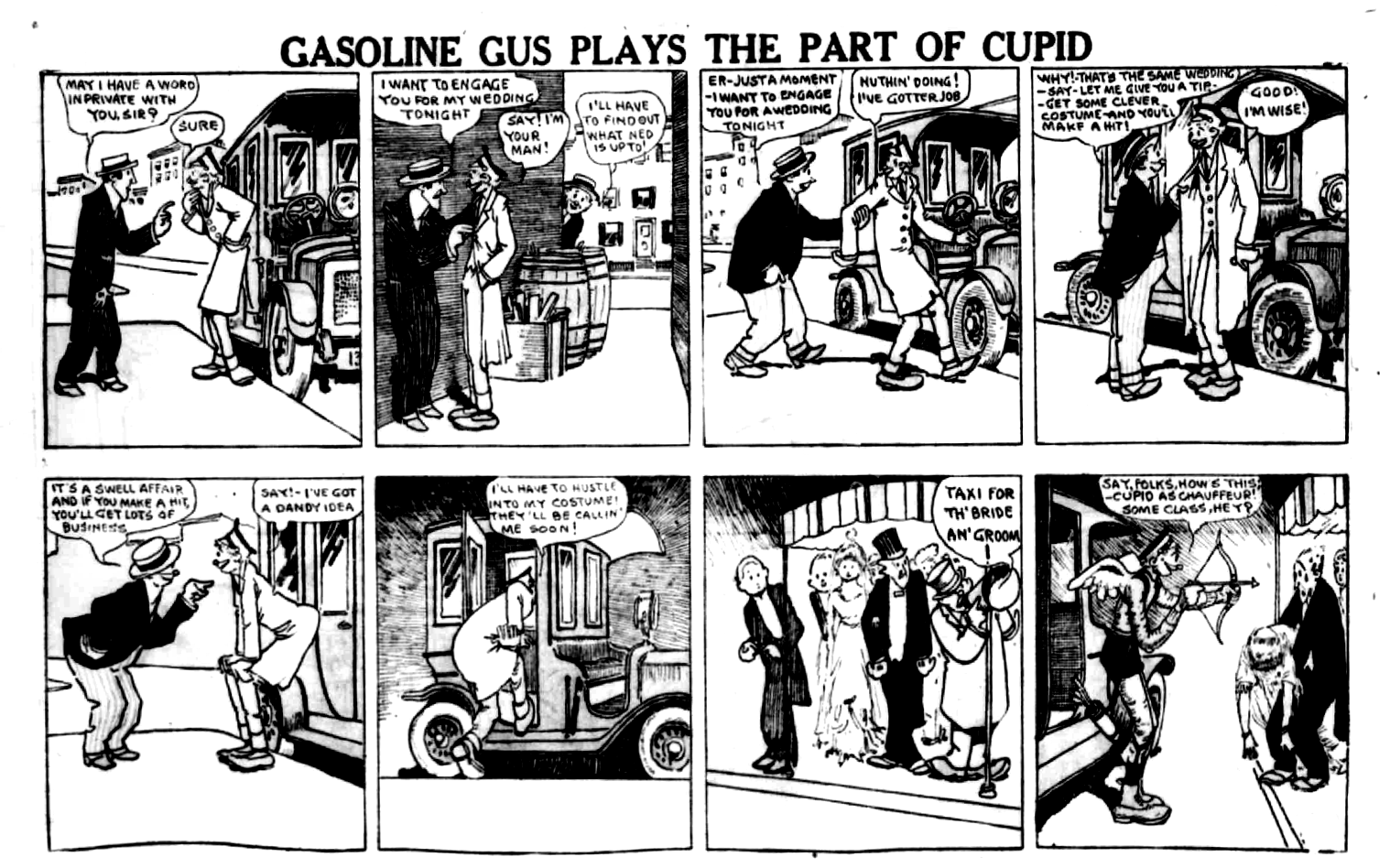
Gasoline Gus cartoon (1920)

Gasoline Gus is a character that was popular in cartoon strips, a record single, and films. The comic strip was written by O.P. Williams and was syndicated by the Philadelphia North American between 1913 and 1914. The character Gasoline Gus was a taxi driver and car fanatic who constantly wrecked his early automobile. Billy Murray and the American Quartet recorded the song "Gasoline Gus and his Jitney Bus" in 1915. It was recorded on Edison Record phonograph cylinder. It was one of several songs about jitneys in the U.S. as they became popular in the lead up to World War I.

Two films were made based on Gasoline Gus. The first in 1915 with a cast that included Fay Tincher and Elmer Booth, and the second Gasoline Gus (1921 film). The 1921 film was based on a Saturday Evening Post story by George Pattullo (writer).

The petroleum scientist and Director of Universal Oil Products, Gustav Erloff, was nicknamed Gasoline Gus from 1915.
