= Richard John Cartwright =

Canadian politician

The Right Honourable Sir Richard John Cartwright PC GCMG
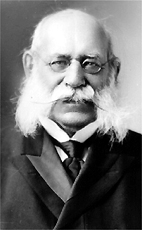

Canadian Senator from Ontario
- In office September 30, 1904 – September 24, 1912
- Prime Minister: Wilfrid Laurier

Minister of Trade and Commerce
- In office July 13, 1896 – September 6, 1911
- Prime Minister: Wilfrid Laurier
- Preceded by: William Bullock Ives
- Succeeded by: George Eulas Foster

Minister of Finance
- In office November 7, 1873 – October 16, 1878
- Prime Minister: Alexander Mackenzie
- Preceded by: Samuel Leonard Tilley
- Succeeded by: Samuel Leonard Tilley

Member of Parliament
- In office February 22, 1887 – September 29, 1904
- Preceded by: Archibald Harley
- Succeeded by: Malcolm Smith Schell
- Constituency: Oxford South
- In office December 10, 1883 – February 21, 1887
- Preceded by: John McMillan
- Succeeded by: John McMillan
- Constituency: Huron South
- In office November 2, 1878 – June 19, 1882
- Preceded by: Horace Horton
- Succeeded by: Riding abolished
- Constituency: Huron Centre
- In office September 20, 1867 – October 8, 1878
- Preceded by: Riding established
- Succeeded by: Edmund John Glyn Hooper
- Constituency: Lennox

Personal details
- Born: December 4, 1835 Kingston, Upper Canada
- Died: September 12, 1912 (aged 76) Kingston, Ontario, Canada
- Spouse: Frances Jane Lawe (m. 1859)
- Children: 10
- Occupation: Politician; businessman

Sir Richard John Cartwright PC GCMG (December 4, 1835 – September 24, 1912) was a Canadian businessman and politician.

Cartwright was one of Canada's most distinguished federal politicians during the late 19th and early 20th centuries. He was a cabinet minister in five Liberal governments. He served in the Canadian Parliament for 43 years and 5 months, being an MP from 1867 to 1904 then a Senator until his death in 1912. Prior to Confederation, he had served 4 years, 1 month and 15 days in the Legislative Assembly of the old Province of Canada. Thus, he was a legislator for more than 47 and a half years. He was a vigorous and trenchant orator, and was known as 'the Rupert of debate'. In particular, his debates with his Conservative counterpart, Sir George Eulas Foster, are the stuff of Canadian Parliamentary legend.

He was a progressive. A free trader, he stood against the Conservatives' high-tariff policy. Often propounding on the inalienable right of Canadian freeman to vote for and in support of their patriotic convictions independent of any party, he favoured proportional representation via Single Transferable Voting. He supported the fight of western farmers for accessible terminal grain elevators in 1910.

== Early life ==
He was born and raised in Kingston, Upper Canada in a United Empire Loyalist family, the son of Harriet Dobbs Cartwright and the grandson of Richard Cartwright, a Loyalist who was expelled from the U.S. at the time of the War of Independence. His father, Robert Cartwright, was an Anglican minister. His uncle, John Solomon Cartwright, was his father’s twin brother and a notable businessman, lawyer, banker, and politician, being a member of the last Legislative Assembly of Upper Canada and then a member of the first Legislative Assembly of the Province of Canada.

Richard Cartwright was a major landowner in the area, and became prominent in Kingston's financial community as president of the Commercial Bank of Canada. He suffered a major blow when his bank failed in 1867.

== Political career ==
Cartwright entered politics when he was elected as a Conservative Party member and supporter of John A. Macdonald in the Province of Canada's legislative assembly in 1863. In 1867, upon Canadian Confederation, the Province of Canada was split into the two new provinces, Ontario and Quebec.

In 1867, Cartwright was elected to the newly formed House of Commons of Canada, again as a Tory. He was MP for the riding of Lennox, Ontario.

=== Crosses floor to join Liberals ===
In the year 1869, he broke with the Conservatives over Macdonald's appointment of Sir Francis Hincks as Minister of Finance, and crossed the floor to join the Liberal Party of Canada.

=== Cabinet Minister for Mackenzie ===
With the Liberal party's victory in the 1874 election, Cartwright was appointed Minister of Finance by Prime Minister Alexander Mackenzie. He supported free trade, but sought limited tariffs as a means of generating government revenue.

=== Knighted ===
Cartwright was not elected in the 1878 general election but was successful in a Nov. 2, 1878 by-election in the riding of Huron Centre. He sat as member for that riding for the following ten years.

He sat in the opposition bench. (The Liberals were defeated in the 1878 election.)

In recognition of his service, he was awarded a knighthood in 1879.

From the 1887 election, he represented the riding of Oxford South.

In 1887, he called for the House of Commons to consider proportional representation.

In the 1890s, the Liberals moved away from support for unrestricted reciprocity with the United States, and Cartwright's influence in the party diminished.

=== Cabinet Minister for Laurier ===
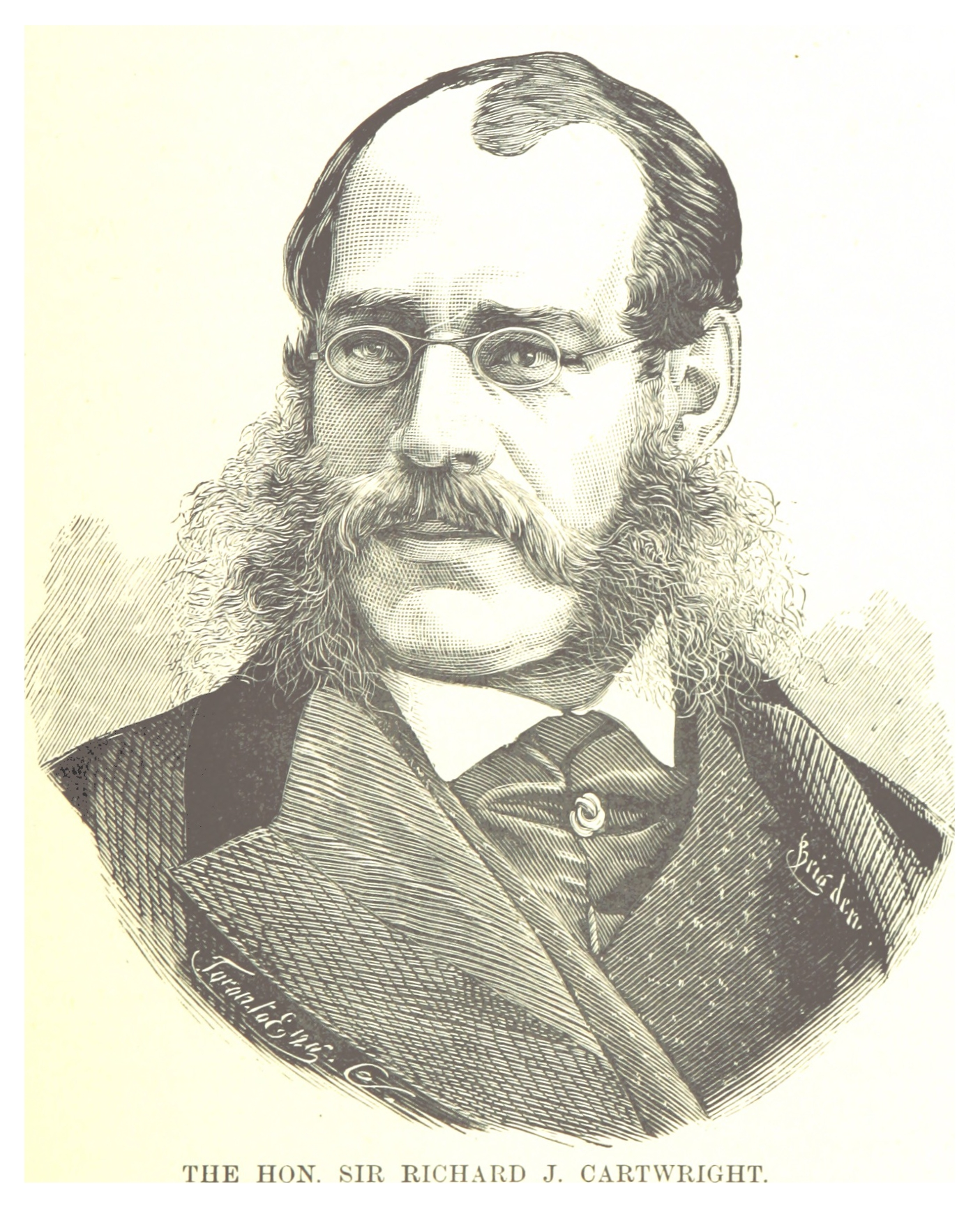
Sir Richard J. Cartwright

With the victory of Wilfrid Laurier's Liberals in the 1896 election, Cartwright returned to Cabinet. Laurier denied Cartwright the finance ministry as a way of assuring Canada's business community that the government was not going to adopt free trade. Instead, he appointed Cartwright Minister of Trade and Commerce. Cartwright also served as a Canadian member of the Anglo-American Joint High Commission to resolve diplomatic problems between Canada and the United States in 1898. Cartwright was appointed to the Imperial Privy Council in 1902.

=== Senate of Canada ===
In 1904, he was elevated to the Senate of Canada, but remained Trade and Commerce minister until the fall of the Laurier government in the 1911 election. In this position he introduced, in 1908, a limited system of old age annuities. Additionally, he served as Leader of the Government in the Senate from 1909 until 1911, and as Leader of the Opposition in the Senate from 1911 until his death in 1912.

== Personal life ==
In August 1859 he married Frances Jane Lawe of Cork, Ireland. They had seven sons and three daughters.

Their eldest son, Lieutenant Colonel Robert Cartwright, studied at the Royal Military College of Canada in Kingston, Ontario from 1878 to 1881, where he won several academic prizes. He was a railway engineer in Manitoba. He served in the suppression of the 1885 North-West Rebellion and fought South African Boer rebels during the Boer war, where he was mentioned in dispatches four times. He served as assistant adjutant-general at militia headquarters and as a musketry officer during World War I.

== Legacy and archives ==
In the Kingston, Ontario, area, Cartwright Street and Cartwright Point are named for him and his family, in recognition of their longstanding contributions to the region. He is honoured with commemorative plaques in Kingston on King Street (at his former residence) and in Memorial Hall, City Hall.

His memories were preserved in his book Reminiscences, published in 1912.

There is a Cartwright Family Fonds with the Ontario provincial archives, consisting of documents from 1799 to 1913. The documents were generated by Richard Cartwright, his sons John Solomon Cartwright and the Reverend Robert David Cartwright, Robert's wife Harriet (Dobbs) Cartwright and their son, Sir Richard Cartwright.

== Electoral record ==
By-election: On Mr. Cartwright being named Minister of Trade and Commerce, 30 July 1896: South Riding of Oxford
Party	Candidate	Votes
Liberal	Sir R. J. Cartwright	acclaimed

1900 Canadian federal election: South Riding of Oxford
Party	Candidate	Votes
Liberal	Sir R. J. Cartwright	2,042
Conservative	Stephen King	1,226

== Notes ==
Parliament of Canada
Preceded by None	Member of Parliament for Lennox; 1867–1878	Succeeded by Edmund John Glyn Hooper
Preceded by Horace Horton	Member of Parliament for Huron Centre; 1878–1882	Succeeded by The electoral district was abolished in 1882.
Preceded by John McMillan	Member of Parliament for Huron South; 1883–1887	Succeeded by John McMillan
Preceded by Archibald Harley	Member of Parliament for Oxford South; 1887–1904	Succeeded by Malcolm Smith Schell
Political offices
Preceded by Samuel Tilley	Minister of Finance; November 7, 1873 – October 16, 1878	Succeeded by Samuel Tilley
Preceded by William Bullock Ives	Minister of Trade and Commerce; 1896–1911	Succeeded by George Eulas Foster
Government offices
Preceded by Sir Richard William Scott	Leader of the Government in the Senate of Canada; 1909–1911	Succeeded by Sir James Alexander Lougheed
Preceded by James Alexander Lougheed	Leader of the Opposition in the Senate of Canada; 1911–1912	Succeeded by George William Ross
