= Bruce Halliday (politician) =

Canadian politician (1926–2011)

Member of the Canadian Parliament for Oxford
- In office 1974–1993
- Preceded by: Wally Nesbitt
- Succeeded by: John Finlay

Personal details
- Born: June 18, 1926 Woodstock, Ontario, Canada
- Died: January 1, 2011 (aged 84) Tavistock, Ontario, Canada
- Party: Progressive Conservative

Bruce Halliday MD CCFP (June 18, 1926 – January 1, 2011) was a Canadian physician and federal politician.

== History ==
Born in Woodstock, Ontario, Halliday was a physician before being elected to the House of Commons of Canada from the Ontario riding of Oxford in the 1974 federal election.

Halliday spent his early years in Ottawa, graduating from Lisgar Collegiate Institute, prior to completing medical studies at the Faculty of Medicine, University of Toronto. He was a family physician in Tavistock, Ontario for twenty-two years, prior to being elected to the House of Commons in 1974.

A Progressive Conservative, he was re-elected four times in 1979, 1980, 1984, and 1988. He did not stand for re-election in 1993. When the Conservatives were in Opposition, he was Critic for Fitness and Amateur Sport. During the 1984–1993 period, when the Conservatives were in government, his primary parliamentary role was as Chair of the House of Commons Standing Committee on Human Rights and the Status of Disabled Persons.

After retiring from office in 1993, he was active with the World Crokinole Championships in his hometown of Tavistock, Ontario. He was the 2004 recipient of the Distinguished Service Award from the Canadian Association of Former Parliamentarians. He was also inducted into the Terry Fox Hall of Fame.

Halliday died on January 1, 2011, at the age of 84.
