= Arpan Khanna =

Canadian politician

Arpan Khanna MP
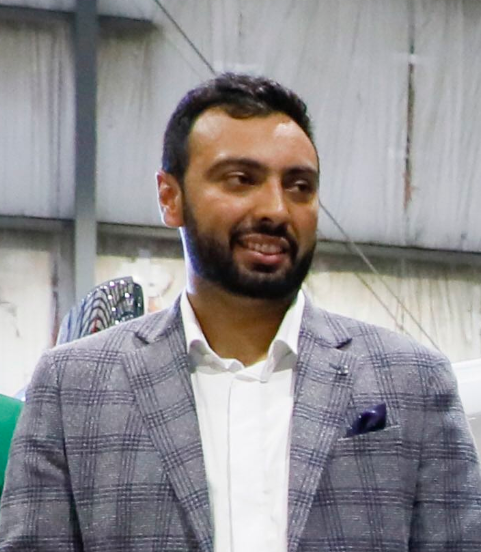
- Khanna in 2019

Member of Parliament for Oxford
- Incumbent
- Assumed office June 19, 2023
- Preceded by: Dave MacKenzie

Personal details
- Born: 1989 or 1990 (age 36–37) Brampton, Ontario
- Party: Conservative
- Education: University of Western Ontario
- Profession: Lawyer

Arpan Khanna is a Canadian politician who was elected to the House of Commons of Canada in a by-election on June 19, 2023. He represents Oxford as a member of the Conservative Party of Canada. Previously, he was a lawyer.

== Background ==
Arpan Khanna was born in Brampton, Ontario to parents who had immigrated from Punjab, India. He graduated from the University of Western Ontario. Khanna is a practicing lawyer. Until January 2024, Khanna sat on the board of governors of the Robert Land Academy, a private boarding school.

In 2022, Arpan Khanna was elected as the Conservative Member of Parliament for Oxford.

== Career ==
During the Harper government, Khanna was a ministerial staffer for Jason Kenney. He was also an outreach staffer to Tim Hudak.

In 2023, Khanna was named 12 to watch on Canada's rapidly rising right by the National Post and in 2024, he was named one of the Top 25 most influential Conservatives in federal politics by the Hill Times.

=== 2019 federal election ===
During the 2019 election, Khanna was deafeated by Liberal incumbent Ruby Sahota in Brampton North.

=== 2022 leadership race ===
Khanna served as the Ontario co-chair for Pierre Poilievre's successful leadership bid. Subsequently, he became the national outreach chair for the Conservative Party.

=== 2023 Oxford by-election ===
In 2023, Khanna decided to run for the Conservative Nomination for the Riding of Oxford to succeed then-Member of Parliament, Dave MacKenzie. In February 2023, MacKenzie criticized Khanna for promoting a quote implying that Conservative leader, Pierre Poilievre endorsed him for the nomination and the party was supporting Khanna's candidacy. MacKenzie believed it a violation of the party nomination rules based on the Conservative's code of conduct.

On June 19, Khanna was elected to the riding.

=== 2025 federal election ===
Khanna along side fellow caucus member Tim Uppal are responsible for the party outreach towards minority communities.

Arpan Khanna now serves as the Conservative Shadow Minister for Justice and Attorney General of Canada after a shadow cabinet reshuffle done in summer 2026. He was appointed as the Vice Chair to the Standing Committee on Justice and Human Rights which studies the bills, policies, programs and spending of the Department of Justice and the six federal agencies related to its portfolio.

== Electoral record ==
2025 Canadian federal election: Oxford
** Preliminary results — Not yet official **
Party	Candidate	Votes	%	±%	Expenditures
Conservative	Arpan Khanna	38,132	53.14	+6.35	
Liberal	David Hilderley	27,243	37.97	+17.30	
New Democratic	Matthew Chambers	3,134	4.37	–14.07	
Christian Heritage	Jacob Watson	1,203	1.68	+0.92	
Green	Cheryle Baker	1,061	1.48	–1.22	
People's	Steven Beausoleil	637	0.89	–9.75	
United	Melanie Van Brugge	239	0.33	N/A	
Independent	Akshay Varun Raj Vardhan	109	0.15	N/A	
Total valid votes/expense limit					
Total rejected ballots					
Turnout		71,758	71.85		
Eligible voters		99,871			
Conservative notional hold		Swing		–10.95	
Source: Elections Canada
Note: Change in percentage value and swing are calculated from the redistributed results of the 2021 general election, not the June 2023 by-election.

Canadian federal by-election, June 19, 2023: Oxford Resignation of Dave MacKenzie
Party	Candidate	Votes	%	±%
Conservative	Arpan Khanna	16,688	42.92	-4.13
Liberal	David Hilderley	14,164	36.43	+15.90
New Democratic	Cody Groat	4,053	10.42	-7.86
Christian Heritage	John Markus	1,672	4.30	+3.53
People's	Wendy Martin	1,278	3.29	-7.36
Green	Cheryle Baker	854	2.20	-0.52
Independent	John The Engineer Turmel	171	0.44	
Total valid votes		38,880	99.38	
Total rejected ballots		243	0.62	+0.01
Turnout		39,123	39.81	-25.08
Eligible voters		98,270		
Conservative hold		Swing		-10.01
Source: Elections Canada

2019 Canadian federal election: Brampton North
Party	Candidate	Votes	%	±%	Expenditures
Liberal	Ruby Sahota	25,970	51.42	+3.05	$76,162.12
Conservative	Arpan Khanna	13,973	27.67	-5.32	$100,060.30
New Democratic	Melissa Edwards	8,382	16.90	+0.40	$17,829.85
Green	Norbert D'Costa	1,516	3.00	+1.10	$0.00
People's	Keith Frazer	510	1.01	–	none listed
Total valid votes/expense limit		50,502	99.03		
Total rejected ballots		496	0.97		
Turnout		50,998	65.19		
Eligible voters		78,229			
Liberal hold		Swing		+4.11	
Source: Elections Canada
