= Almon Rennie =

Canadian politician

Member of Parliament for Oxford South
- In office April 1934 – October 1935
- Preceded by: Thomas Merritt Cayley
- Succeeded by: riding dissolved

Member of Parliament for Oxford
- In office October 1935 – June 1945
- Preceded by: riding created
- Succeeded by: Kenneth Daniel

Personal details
- Born: Almon Secord Rennie; 17 August 1882 Linwood, Ontario, Canada
- Died: 26 October 1949 (aged 67)
- Party: Liberal
- Spouse(s): Catherine Mackay m. October 1921
- Profession: merchant

Almon Secord Rennie (17 August 1882 – 26 October 1949) was a Canadian businessman and politician. Rennie was a Liberal party member of the House of Commons of Canada. He was born in Linwood, Ontario and became a merchant by career.

Rennie attended schools at Linwood, then Westervelt Business College in London. In 1928 and 1929, he served as Ontario Grand Master for the Independent Order of Odd Fellows, and at one point chaired the association's Home Board based in Toronto.

From 1922 to 1924, Rennie was mayor of Tillsonburg, Ontario, and served as a deputy reeve for Oxford County council.

He was first elected to Parliament at the Oxford South riding in a by-election on 16 April 1934. After riding boundary changes, Rennie won the new Oxford riding in the 1935 election, and re-elected in 1940. Rennie was defeated in 1945 by Kenneth Daniel of the Progressive Conservatives.

By-election: On Mr. Cayley's death, 16 April 1934: Oxford South
Party	Candidate	Votes
Liberal	Almon Secord Rennie	6,692
Conservative	Hon. Donald Sutherland	5,199
