= James Sutherland (Canadian politician) =

Canadian politician (1849–1905)

The Honourable James Sutherland PC
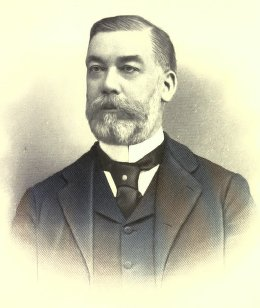

Member of the Canadian Parliament for Oxford North
- In office 1880–1905
- Preceded by: Thomas Oliver
- Succeeded by: George Smith

Personal details
- Born: July 17, 1849 Ancaster Township, Canada West
- Died: May 3, 1905 (aged 55)
- Party: Liberal
- Cabinet: Minister Without Portfolio (1899–1902); Minister of Marine and Fisheries (1902); Minister of Public Works (1902–1905)
- Portfolio: Chief Government Whip (1896–1900); Whip of the Liberal Party (1896–1900)

James Sutherland, PC (July 17, 1849 – May 3, 1905) was a Canadian politician.

Born in Ancaster Township, Canada West, he was a merchant before being elected to the House of Commons of Canada for the riding of Oxford North in an 1880 by-election. A Liberal, he was re-elected in 1882, 1887, 1891, 1896, 1900, and 1904. From 1896 to 1900, he was the Chief Government Whip. He subsequently joined the Cabinet of Sir Wilfrid Laurier and was successively Minister without Portfolio, Minister of Marine and Fisheries, and Minister of Public Works.

Sutherland died in office on May 3, 1905, at the age of 55.
