= Erwin Smith =

Erwin Smith may refer to:

- Erwin E. Smith (1886–1947), American photographer
- Erwin Frink Smith (1854–1927), American plant pathologist
- Erwin Smith (Attack on Titan), a character in the manga and anime series
