= Clark Murray (politician) =

Canadian politician (1900–1983)

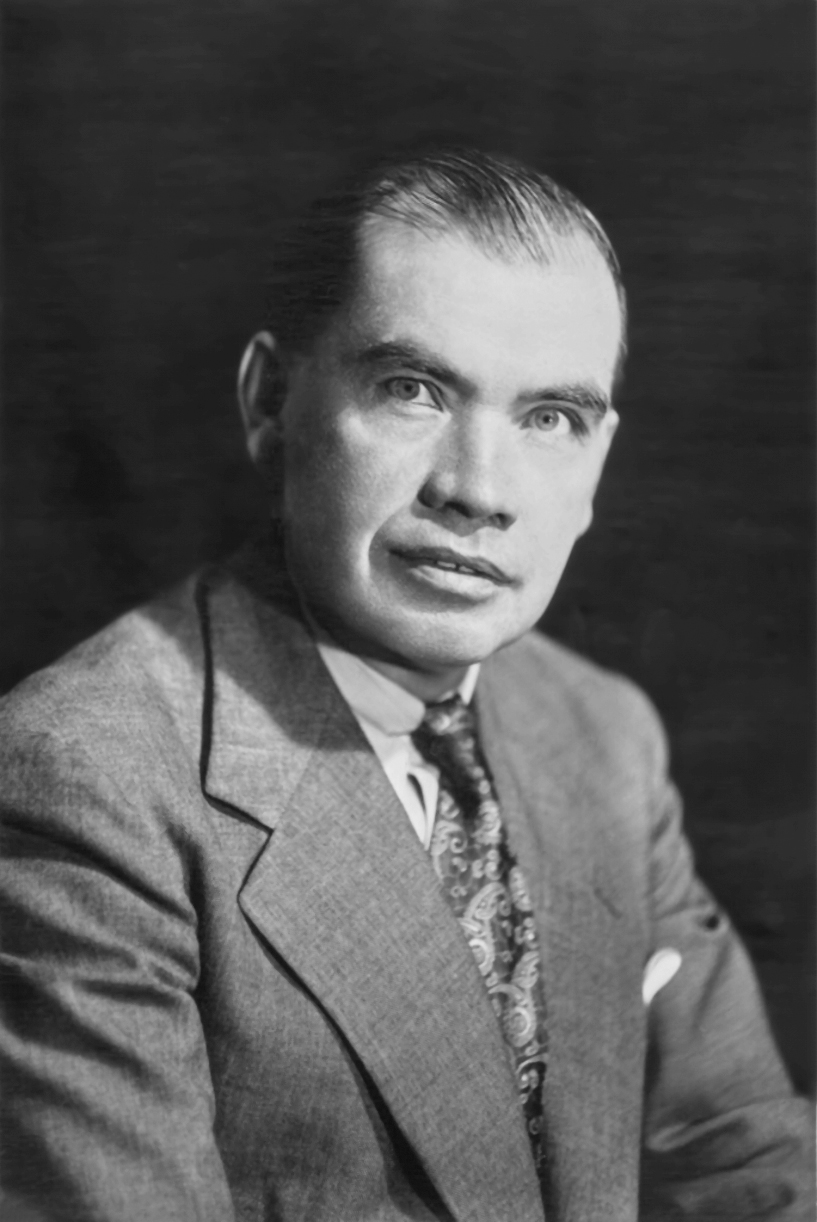

Member of Parliament for Oxford
- In office June 27, 1949 – August 9, 1953
- Preceded by: Kenneth Daniel
- Succeeded by: Wally Nesbitt

Personal details
- Born: Alexander Clark Murray; 24 July 1900 West Zorra Township, Ontario
- Died: 28 November 1983 (aged 83) Woodstock, Ontario
- Party: Liberal
- Spouse(s): Grace Rankin m. 8 June 1926
- Profession: Pharmacist

Alexander Clark Murray (24 July 1900 – 28 November 1983) was a Liberal party member of the House of Commons of Canada. He was born in West Zorra Township, Ontario, and became a pharmacist after graduating from high school (Woodstock Collegiate Institute) then the College of Pharmacy affiliated with the University of Toronto. He operated Clark Murray Pharmacy in Woodstock, Ontario.

He was first elected to Parliament at the Oxford riding in the 1949 general election and served for one term. Murray was defeated by Wally Nesbitt of the Progressive Conservative party in the 1953 federal election.

He died on 28 November 1983.
