= George Smith (Ontario politician) =

Canadian politician

George Smith (March 6, 1852 – July 24, 1930) was a Scottish-born lawyer and political figure in Ontario, Canada. He represented Oxford North in the House of Commons of Canada from 1905 to 1908 as a Liberal.

He was born in Cambuslang, Lanarkshire, the son of John Douglas Smith and Margaret Paton. Smith was educated at the University of Toronto and Osgoode Hall. In 1893, he married Dr. Emily Janet Irvine (1858–1932). Smith was connected with the Crown Bank of Woodstock. He was elected to the House of Commons in a 1905 by-election held following the death of James Sutherland. Smith did not run for reelection in 1908.
