= Thomas Merritt Cayley =

Canadian politician

Member of Parliament for Oxford South
- In office September 1926 – May 1933
- Preceded by: Donald Sutherland
- Succeeded by: Almon Rennie

Personal details
- Born: Thomas Merritt Cayley; 18 August 1878 East Oxford Township, Ontario, Canada
- Died: 30 May 1933 (aged 54)
- Party: Liberal
- Spouse(s): Elinor Carroll m. 14 June 1904
- Profession: insurance agent, school principal, teacher

Thomas Merritt Cayley (18 August 1878 – 30 May 1933) was a Liberal party member of the House of Commons of Canada. He was born in East Oxford Township, Ontario and became an insurance agent, school principal and teacher.

Cayley attended secondary school at Norwich and normal school in London, Ontario. He was a schoolteacher for 18 years, based in Norwich five years into this career. He was principal of Norwich Continuation School for four years. He was also secretary-treasurer for Otter Mutual Insurance and Mutual Fire Underwriters of Ontario.

He was first elected to Parliament at the Oxford South riding in the 1926 general election then re-elected in 1930. Cayley died on 30 May 1933 before completing his term in the 17th Canadian Parliament.

1926 Canadian federal election: Oxford South
Party	Candidate	Votes
Liberal	Thomas Merritt Cayley	6,064
Conservative	Hon. Donald Sutherland	5,364

1930 Canadian federal election: Oxford South
Party	Candidate	Votes
Liberal	Thomas Merritt Cayley	5,711
Conservative	Hon. Donald Sutherland	5,656
