= Isabel Ecclestone Mackay =

Canadian novelist and poet

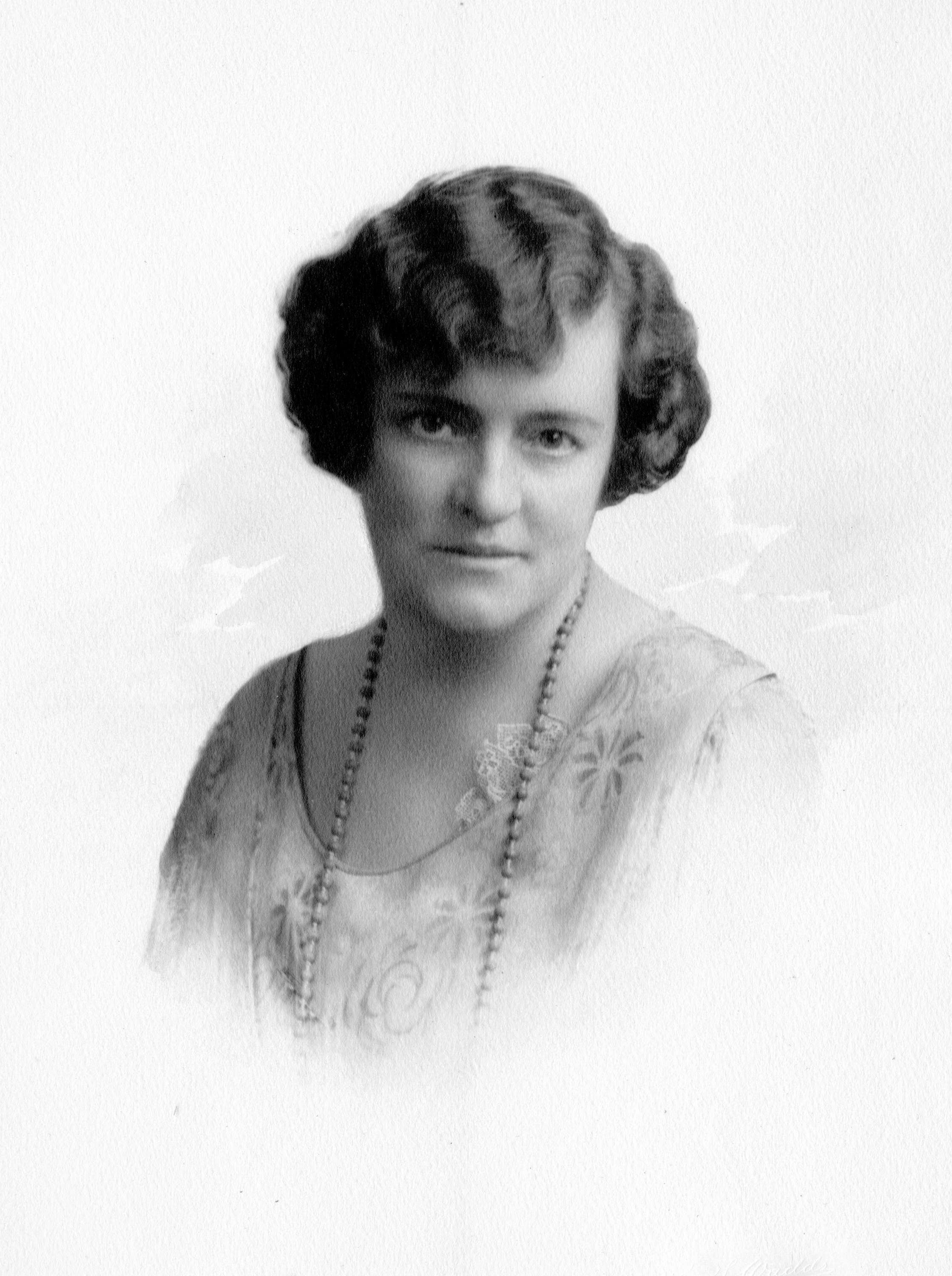
- Born: Isabel Ecclestone MacPherson; November 25, 1875; Woodstock, Ontario
- Died: August 15, 1928 (aged 52)
- Spouse: Peter John Mackay
- Writing career
- Language: English

Isabel Ecclestone Mackay (née MacPherson) (November 25, 1875 – August 15, 1928) was a Canadian novelist and poet.

== Biography ==
Born in Woodstock, Ontario, she was the daughter of Donald McLeod MacPherson, an early Scottish settler of Oxford County, and Priscilla Ecclestone of England. She was educated at the Woodstock Collegiate Institute. At the age of 15 she started writing for Canadian newspapers and magazines. From 1890 to 1909 she contributed to the Woodstock Daily Express using the pseudonym "Heather".

In 1895, she married Peter John Mackay, a court stenographer. Together they had three daughters: Phyllis, Margaret, and Janet Priscilla. The family moved to Vancouver in 1909, after Peter landed a position with the British Columbia Supreme Court. The couple would remain in Vancouver until their deaths, with Mackay making her mark as a prominent member of the literary community. Among her close friends were E. Pauline Johnson and Marjorie Pickthall, both of whom Mackay cared for at the end of their lives. She also played an integral role in the release of their final books, as a member of the trust that oversaw the release of Johnson's Legends of Vancouver (1911) and as a hostess to Pickthall who wrote The Wood Carver's Wife (1922) at the Mackay summer home in Boundary Bay.

Over the last 34 years of her life, she published five novels, four collections of poems and five plays, in addition to contributing over three hundred poems and short stories to various publications. Mackay was the founder of the British Columbia chapter of the Canadian Women's Press Club, serving as its vice-president in 1914 and, subsequently, as its president 1916. She also served as the Vice-President of the Vancouver chapter of the Canadian Authors Association from 1922 to 1926. In 1926, her play Treasure won the open Canadian Imperial Order Daughters of the Empire contest.

Mackay died of cancer on August 15, 1928. She had been sick for a year prior to her death.

== Bibliography ==
=== Children's books ===
- The Shining Ship, and Other Verse for Children. Toronto: McClelland, Goodchild & Stewart. 1918.

=== Novels ===
- The House of Windows. London: Cassell. 1912.
- Up the Hill and Over. Toronto: McClelland, Goodchild & Stewart. 1917.
- Mist of Morning. Toronto: McClelland, Goodchild & Stewart. 1919.
- The Window-Gazer. Toronto: McClelland & Stewart. 1921
- Blencarrow. Toronto: Thomas Allen. 1926

=== Poetry ===
- Between the Lights. Toronto: W. Briggs. 1904.
- Fires of Driftwood. Toronto: McClelland & Stewart. 1922
- The Complete Poems of Isabel Ecclestone Mackay. Toronto: McClelland & Stewart. 1930

=== Other ===
- Indian Nights. Toronto: McClelland & Stewart. 1930 (First Nations legends)
