= Hugh Allan (politician) =

Canadian politician

Member of Parliament for Oxford North
- In office September 1926 – July 1930
- Preceded by: Donald Sutherland
- Succeeded by: Donald Sutherland

Personal details
- Born: 27 August 1865 Blenheim Township, Canada West
- Died: 5 April 1949 (aged 83)
- Party: Liberal
- Spouse(s): Mary Helen Rupert m. 28 July 1887
- Profession: clerk, conveyancer, notary

Hugh Allan (27 August 1865 – 5 April 1949) was a Liberal party member of the House of Commons of Canada. He was born in Blenheim Township, Canada West and became a clerk, conveyancer and notary.

Allan attended Richwood School in Oxford County. He became a municipal clerk and treasurer.

He was elected to Parliament at the Oxford North riding in the 1926 general election when he defeated Conservative incumbent Donald Sutherland. After serving his only term, the 16th Canadian Parliament, Allan was defeated by Sutherland in the 1930 federal election.
