= John Baird Finlay =

Canadian politician

Member of Parliament for Oxford
- In office October 25, 1993 – June 28, 2004
- Preceded by: Bruce Halliday
- Succeeded by: Dave Mackenzie

Personal details
- Born: January 29, 1929 Santo Domingo, Dominican Republic
- Died: October 17, 2010 (aged 81) Tavistock, Ontario, Canada
- Party: Liberal
- Spouse(s): Tove Jensen; Mary Ann Silverthorn
- Profession: teacher, superintendent

John Baird Finlay (January 29, 1929 – October 17, 2010) was a member of the House of Commons of Canada from 1993 to 2004. His career had been in the school system, as a teacher and superintendent.

Finlay was born in 1929 in Santo Domingo, Dominican Republic. He attended John Wanless public school in Toronto (1934–36), then a PNEU school in Croydon. England in 1936. He returned to Toronto in 1937 and attended Hodgson public school until 1942 followed by University of Toronto Schools until 1947. He then studied at Victoria College, Toronto earning a Bachelor of Arts in 1952.

His teaching career included terms at Upper Canada College from 1952 to 1954, then in Woodstock, Ontario, from 1955 to 1964 except for the 1957–58 school year at Ingersoll District Collegiate Institute (IDCI). He was assistant secretary of the Ontario Secondary School Teachers' Federation from 1964 to 1967. He became vice-principal (1967–69) and principal (1970–73) in Woodstock, Ontario, and returned to IDCI as principal from 1973 to 1977. He earned a Master of Education at the University of Western Ontario in 1977. From that year to 1988, he was superintendent of schools for the Oxford County Board of Education.

Finlay made unsuccessful attempts at political office in the 1963 Woodstock municipal election, and in the 1981 and 1987 Ontario elections. He was elected to federal office in the riding of Oxford under the Liberal Party of Canada in the 1993, 1997 and 2000 general elections, serving in the 35th, 36th and 37th Canadian Parliaments respectively.

Finlay left office in 2004 as he chose not to campaign again for the Oxford riding. David Mackenzie of the Conservative party won the riding in that year's general election.

Towards the end of his life, Finlay suffered from Parkinson's disease. He died at a care facility in Tavistock, Ontario on October 17, 2010, at the age of 81.
