= George Pattullo (writer) =

Canadian journalist and author

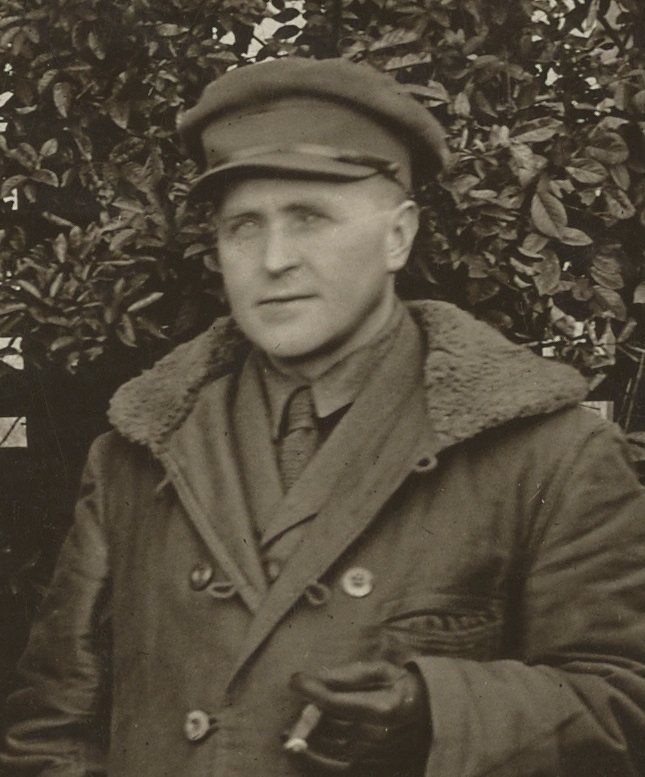
- George Pattullo in Konstanz in December 1918
- Born: October 9, 1879
- Died: July 29, 1967

George Pattullo (October 9, 1879 – July 29, 1967) was a Canadian journalist and author who wrote articles and stories for various publications including the Saturday Evening Post, McClure's Magazine, American Magazine, and Popular Magazine. He also served as a World War I correspondent, and wrote several novels. One of his stories was the basis for the film Gasoline Gus (1921 film). He was the first to report the wartime heroism of Alvin C. York. He was an editor at the Boston Herald. He wrote stories and novels about the American West after traveling it with photographer Erwin Smith during the summers of 1908 - 1910.

Born in Woodstock, Ontario, to George Robson Pattullo and Mary (Rounds) Pattullo he had Scottish ancestry. He attended Woodstock Collegiate Institute and the University of Toronto, then worked at newspapers in Montreal, London, and Boston.

He married Lucile Wilson, daughter of Dallas businessman J. B. Wilson. He died July 29, 1967, in New York City and is buried at Hillcrest Mausoleum in Dallas.

The George C. Marshall Foundation library has notes from an interview with Pattullo May 8, 1959.

== Bibliography ==
- Hellwood
- Horrors of Moonlight
- "Corazon", McClure's July 1910
- “The Rebellion of Kitty Bell”, The Saturday Evening Post, 2 April 1910
- The Untamed, range life in the southwest (ca. 1911) McLeod & Allen, Toronto
- The sheriff of Badger; a tale of the southwest borderland, D. Appleton, New York (1912)
- Fightin' Sons of Guns (1917)
- "Her Man", Saturday Evening Post, 194:8 July 2, 1921
- "Old Granite Face", Saturday Evening Post, 194:15 February 4, 1922
- Tight lines! (1938), A 170 page collection of short sketches privately printed by Allsion & Depew (New York) in an edition of 300 for Pattullo's friends
- A Good Rooster Crows Everywhere (1939)
- All Our Yesterdays (1948)
- Always new frontiers (1951)
- Some Men in Their Time (1959)
