= Malcolm Smith Schell =

Canadian politician

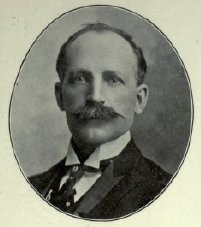

Member of the Canadian Parliament for Oxford South
- In office 1904–1911
- Preceded by: Richard John Cartwright
- Succeeded by: Donald Sutherland

Personal details
- Born: 13 November 1855 Woodstock, Canada West
- Died: 25 December 1926 (aged 71)
- Party: Liberal
- Relations: Jacob Thomas Schell, brother

Malcolm Smith Schell (13 November 1855 – 25 December 1926) was a Canadian politician.

Born in County of Oxford, near Woodstock, Canada West, son of Jacob Schell and Catherine Smith. He is Great Grandson of Johann Christian Schell, a Palatine German from German Flatts, New York who died fighting for the Americans in 1782 on his farm. The family moved to Canada after the American Revolution to take advantage of the land available in Ontario. Schell was educated at public schools and Woodstock College. An agriculturist, a lumberman and a produce exporter, he was elected to the House of Commons of Canada for the Ontario electoral district of Oxford South in the federal election of 1904. A Liberal, he was re-elected in 1908 and was defeated in 1911 and 1917.

His brother Jacob Thomas also served in the House of Commons.

1904 Canadian federal election: South Riding of Oxford
Party	Candidate	Votes
Liberal	Malcolm S. Schell	2,565
Conservative	J. C. Henderson	2,070

1908 Canadian federal election: South Riding of Oxford
Party	Candidate	Votes
Liberal	Malcolm Smith Schell	2,712
Conservative	Donald Sutherland	2,619
