= Hugh Allen =

Hugh Allen may refer to:

- Hugh Allen (politician) (1889–1972), member of the Legislative Assembly of Alberta, 1926–1935
- Hugh Allen (conductor) (1869–1946), English musician
- Hugh Allen (sailor) (1924–2013), Irish Olympic sailor
- St George Henry Rathborne (1854–1938), American author who wrote under this name
- Hugh Allen (bishop) (died 1572), Anglican bishop

== See also ==
- Hugh Allan (disambiguation)
