= Kenneth Daniel =

Canadian politician (1892–1965)

Mayor of Ingersoll, Ontario
- In office 1943–1944

Member of Parliament for Oxford
- In office June 1945 – June 1949
- Preceded by: Almon Secord Rennie
- Succeeded by: Alexander Clark Murray

Personal details
- Born: Kenneth Roy Daniel; 31 August 1892 Ingersoll, Ontario, Canada
- Died: 23 September 1965 (aged 73)
- Party: Progressive Conservative
- Spouse(s): Laura King m. 17 March 1921
- Profession: farmer

Kenneth Roy Daniel (31 August 1892 – 23 September 1965) was a Progressive Conservative party member of the House of Commons of Canada. He was born in Ingersoll, Ontario, and became a farmer by career.

Daniel attended school at Ingersoll Collegiate Institute and Woodstock Business College. He was a town councillor for Ingersoll from 1940 to 1942, then the community's mayor in 1943 and 1944.

He was first elected to Parliament at the Oxford riding in the 1945 general election then defeated in the 1949 election by Alexander Clark Murray of the Liberal party.
