= Beatrice Nasmyth =

Canadian suffragette and journalist (1885–1977)

Beatrice Sifton Nasmyth
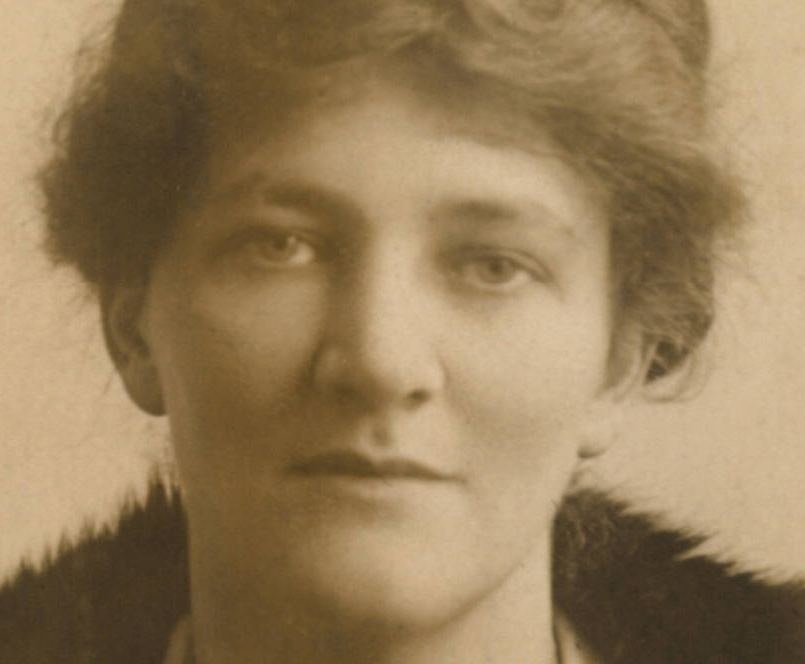
- Born: Beatrice Sifton Nasmyth; August 12, 1885; Stratford, Ontario, Canada
- Died: October 23, 1977 (aged 92); Vancouver, British Columbia
- Occupation: Journalist

Beatrice Sifton Nasmyth (August 12, 1885 – October 23, 1977), later Beatrice Sifton Nasmyth Furniss was a Canadian suffragette and war correspondent during the First World War. She was a reporter for the Daily Province in Vancouver from 1910 to 1919, which took her to Europe to cover the war and the subsequent peace treaty.

== Early life and family ==
Nasmyth was born to Deborah (nee Dignam) and James Nasmyth on August 12, 1885 in Stratford, Ontario. Her father was a pharmacist. She was the third child born out of five and the only daughter. Her aunt was Mary Dignam, a painter and the founder of the Women's Art Association of Canada. Dignam would later influence Nasmyth in her suffragist and feminist views.

Nasmyth graduated from Woodstock Collegiate Institute and then attended finishing school at Alma College in St. Thomas, Ontario. After graduation, she studied at the University of Toronto before leaving in 1907. Her first journalist job was at the Woodstock Sentinel-Review. In 1910, she moved to Vancouver, British Columbia, where one of her brothers was living. Nasmyth continued writing, and in two years she was reporting for The Vancouver Daily World and editing book reviews for the weekly B.C. Saturday Sunset. She also joined the Vancouver Province (also known as the Daily Province) as assistant women's editor.

Nasmyth helped found the Vancouver branch of the Canadian Women's Press Club (CWPC), and in 1913 she took on the role of president. She was close friends with poet and author Pauline Johnson (another member of the CWPC). In 1914, Nasmyth participated in the Komagata Maru incident, where she became part of a crowd of Canadian citizens and officials who prevented a ship full of Indian immigrants from coming ashore.

== First World War ==
The Province sent Nasmyth to London to cover the war in 1914. She was known for trying to evade press censorship by smuggling her articles past the censors. She would give her articles to one of her brothers, a businessman who often traveled to England, and he would smuggle the reports back to Canada.

Nasmyth covered the Paris Peace Conference in 1919, acting as press secretary to Canadian delegate Arthur Sifton, who was her second cousin. She was the lone female journalist in attendance at the signing of the Treaty of Versailles.

== Political activism ==
In 1917, Nasmyth was the campaign manager for Roberta MacAdams, a military dietitian who ran for the Legislative Assembly of Alberta, who became the second woman ever elected to the Assembly.

== Later life ==
Nasmyth married Mackenzie Furniss in 1918. The couple arrived back in Canada in 1920, settling in Montreal. In 1921, they had a son named Harry, and then in 1924, they had a daughter named Monica. Nasmyth started writing fiction for the British magazine Modern Woman and the Canadian magazine Chatelaine.

Nasmyth died in Vancouver, British Columbia, on October 23, 1977.
