= Woodstock Collegiate Institute =

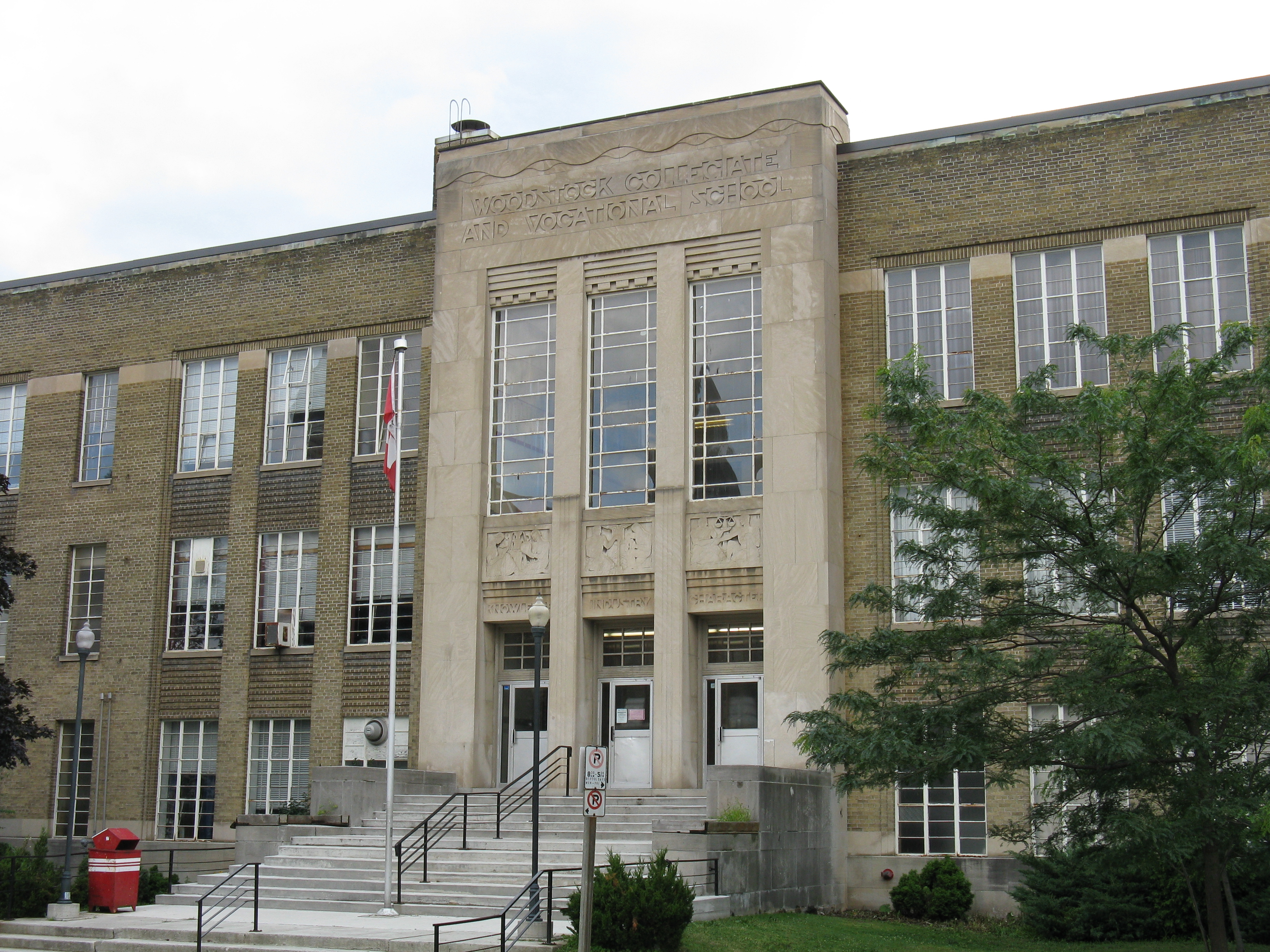
- Main entrance

Location
- 35 Riddell St. Woodstock, Ontario; N4S 6L9; Canada; 43.1313°N 80.7576°W

Information
- Type: Art school
- Founded: 1841; 185 years ago
- School district: Thames Valley
- Superintendent: P. Sydor
- Principal: V. Jones
- Grades: 9–12
- Enrollment: 589 (2018)
- Colors: Red, White
- Team name: Red Devils
- Website: woodstock.tvdsb.ca

Woodstock Collegiate Institute is a school in Woodstock, Ontario, Canada. It is part of the Thames Valley District School Board.

The school was founded in 1841 by an Act of Parliament as Woodstock's first grammar school. Its growth forced a series of physical moves; the school relocated in 1851, 1881, and to its present site in 1939.

The school faced possible closing at the end of the 20th century. It underwent major faculty improvements, including renovating science classrooms, that were completed in 2001.

== Notable alumni ==
- Alfred Apps, lawyer
- Jim Estill (Order of Canada), businessman and philanthropist
- Isabel Ecclestone Mackay, novelist
- John Millar, member of Parliament
- Clark Murray, member of Parliament
- Beatrice Nasmyth, suffragette
- Wally Nesbitt, member of Parliament
- George Pattullo, journalist
- Harry Smith, politician

== See also ==
- Education in Ontario
- List of secondary schools in Ontario
