= James Atchison Skinner =

Canadian politician

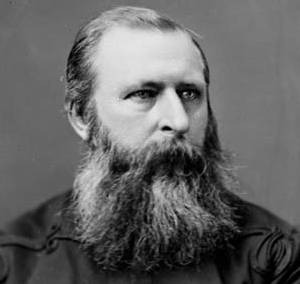
James Atchison Skinner Source: Library and Archives Canada

James Atchison Skinner (26 October 1826 – 24 December 1894) was a Scottish-born farmer, merchant and political figure in Ontario, Canada. He represented Oxford South in the House of Commons of Canada from 1874 to 1882 as a Liberal member.

He was born in Tain, Ross-shire, the son of Hugh Ross Skinner and Mary Fraser McPherson, was educated in Scotland and came to Canada in 1843. He was first employed with a wholesale dry goods firm, establishing an importing and wholesale business in partnership with his younger brother around 1850. In 1849, he married Agnes Johnston, also a native of Scotland. His parents came to Canada in 1861. Skinner served in the militia during the Fenian raids, later reaching the rank of lieutenant-colonel. He operated a farm near Woodstock, Ontario. He was first elected to the House of Commons in an 1874 by-election held after Ebenezer Vining Bodwell was named superintendent for the Welland Canal. Skinner was unsuccessful when he ran for reelection in 1882. He died in West Oxford Township at the age of 68.

Skinner helped organize the Ontario Rifle Association and brought a Canadian team to the rifle competition at Wimbledon in 1870.
