= Oxford South (federal electoral district) =

Former federal electoral district in Ontario, Canada

Ontario electoral district

Defunct federal electoral district
- Legislature: House of Commons
- District created: 1867
- District abolished: 1933
- First contested: 1867
- Last contested: 1934 by-election

Oxford South was a federal electoral district represented in the House of Commons of Canada from 1867 to 1935. It was located in the province of Ontario. It was created by the British North America Act 1867.

In 1882, the South Riding of the county of Oxford consisted of the town of Ingersoll, the village of Norwich, and the townships of Oxford East, Oxford West, Oxford North, Norwich North, Norwich South, Burford and Oakland.

In 1903, the riding was redefined to include the township of Dereham and the town of Tilsonburg, and to exclude the townships of Burford and Oakland.

In 1924, Oxford South was defined to consist of the part of the county of Oxford lying south of and including the townships of Oxford North and Oxford West, south of and excluding the city of Woodstock, and south of and including the township of Oxford East.

The electoral district was abolished in 1933 when it was merged into Oxford riding.

== Members of Parliament ==
This riding has elected the following members of Parliament:

Parliament	Years	Member	Party
1st	1867–1872	Ebenezer Vining Bodwell	Liberal
2nd	1872–1874	Ebenezer Vining Bodwell	Liberal
3rd	1874–1874	Ebenezer Vining Bodwell	Liberal
3rd	1874–1878	James Atchison Skinner	Liberal
4th	1878–1882	James Atchison Skinner	Liberal
5th	1882–1887	Archibald Harley	Liberal
6th	1887–1891	Richard John Cartwright	Liberal
7th	1891–1896	Richard John Cartwright	Liberal
8th	1896–1896	Richard John Cartwright	Liberal
8th	1896–1900	Richard John Cartwright	Liberal
9th	1900–1904	Richard John Cartwright	Liberal
10th	1904–1908	Malcolm Smith Schell	Liberal
11th	1908–1911	Malcolm Smith Schell	Liberal
12th	1911–1917	Donald Sutherland	Conservative
13th	1917–1921	Donald Sutherland	Government (Unionist)
14th	1921–1925	Donald Sutherland	Conservative
15th	1925–1926	Donald Sutherland	Conservative
16th	1926–1930	Thomas Merritt Cayley	Liberal
17th	1930–1934†	Thomas Merritt Cayley	Liberal
17th	1934–1935	Almon Rennie	Liberal
Riding dissolved into Oxford

== Election history ==
1867 Canadian federal election
Party	Candidate	Votes
Liberal	Ebenezer Bodwell	acclaimed
Source: Canadian Elections Database

1872 Canadian federal election
Party	Candidate	Votes
Liberal–Conservative	Ebenezer Vining Bodwell	acclaimed
Source: Canadian Elections Database

1874 Canadian federal election: South Riding of Oxford
Party	Candidate	Votes
Liberal	Ebenezer V. Bodwell	981
Unknown	Dr. Thrall	223

1878 Canadian federal election: South Riding of Oxford
Party	Candidate	Votes
Liberal	James A. Skinner	1,915
Unknown	Joseph Gibson	1,554
Source: Canadian Elections Database

1882 Canadian federal election: South Riding of Oxford
Party	Candidate	Votes
Liberal	Archibald Harley	1,831
Liberal	James A. Skinner	1,054

1887 Canadian federal election: South Riding of Oxford
Party	Candidate	Votes
Liberal	Sir R. J. Cartwright	2,099
Conservative	John J. Hawkins	977

1891 Canadian federal election: South Riding of Oxford
Party	Candidate	Votes
Liberal	Sir R. J. Cartwright	2,021
Conservative	Michael Walsh	1,287

1896 Canadian federal election: South Riding of Oxford
Party	Candidate	Votes
Liberal	Sir R. J. Cartwright	2,347
Conservative	Thomas R. Mayberry	1,597

1900 Canadian federal election: South Riding of Oxford
Party	Candidate	Votes
Liberal	Sir R. J. Cartwright	2,042
Conservative	Stephen King	1,226

1904 Canadian federal election: South Riding of Oxford
Party	Candidate	Votes
Liberal	Malcolm S. Schell	2,565
Conservative	J. C. Henderson	2,070

1908 Canadian federal election: South Riding of Oxford
Party	Candidate	Votes
Liberal	Malcolm Smith Schell	2,712
Conservative	Donald Sutherland	2,619

1911 Canadian federal election: South Riding of Oxford
Party	Candidate	Votes
Conservative	Donald Sutherland	2,503
Liberal	Malcolm Smith Schell	2,479

1917 Canadian federal election: South Riding of Oxford
Party	Candidate	Votes
Government	Donald Sutherland	4,124
Opposition	Malcolm Smith Schell	2,812

1921 Canadian federal election: South Riding of Oxford
Party	Candidate	Votes
Conservative	Donald Sutherland	4,476
Progressive	Martin Lee Haley	3,597
Liberal	Matthew Dean	3,135

1925 Canadian federal election: Oxford South
Party	Candidate	Votes
Conservative	Donald Sutherland	5,400
Liberal	James William Innes	5,200

1926 Canadian federal election: Oxford South
Party	Candidate	Votes
Liberal	Thomas Merritt Cayley	6,064
Conservative	Hon. Donald Sutherland	5,364

1930 Canadian federal election: Oxford South
Party	Candidate	Votes
Liberal	Thomas Merritt Cayley	5,711
Conservative	Hon. Donald Sutherland	5,656

By-election: On Mr. Cayley's death, 16 April 1934: Oxford South
Party	Candidate	Votes
Liberal	Almon Secord Rennie	6,692
Conservative	Hon. Donald Sutherland	5,199

== See also ==
- List of Canadian electoral districts
- Historical federal electoral districts of Canada
