= Thomas Oliver (Canadian politician) =

Canadian politician

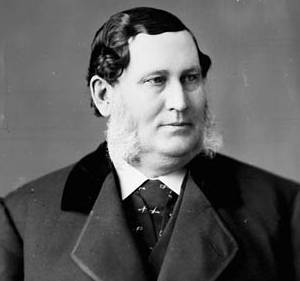
Thomas Oliver Source: Library and Archives Canada

Thomas Oliver (March 1821 – November 8, 1880) was a businessman and political figure in Ontario, Canada. He represented Oxford North in the House of Commons of Canada as a Liberal member from 1867 to 1880.

He was born in Kildonan, Sutherland, Scotland. He taught school there for two years and came to Zorra Township in Oxford County, Upper Canada, where he taught school for several years. Oliver then moved to Woodstock, where he became a dry goods merchant. He served on the town council, becoming reeve for Woodstock and was county warden in 1866. He was elected in the North riding of Oxford in an 1866 by-election held following the death of Hope Fleming Mackenzie and served until Confederation; in 1867, he was elected to the House of Commons and served until his death in Woodstock in 1880.
