= Archibald Harley =

Canadian politician

Archibald Harley (October 10, 1824 – May 19, 1904) was a farmer and political figure in Ontario, Canada. He represented Oxford South in the House of Commons of Canada from 1882 to 1887 as a Liberal member.

He was born in Newcastle, New Brunswick, the son of William Harley, a land surveyor, and was educated in Hamilton, Ontario. In 1847, he married Elizabeth Stewart. For a time, he was involved in the lumber business in Ancaster with his brother-in-law James F. Wilson. Harley served as a member of the council for Burford Township, also serving as deputy reeve and reeve for the township and warden for Brant County.
