= Oxford North (federal electoral district) =

Former federal electoral district in Ontario, Canada

Ontario electoral district

Defunct federal electoral district
- Legislature: House of Commons
- District created: 1867
- District abolished: 1933
- First contested: 1867
- Last contested: 1930 by-election

Oxford North was a federal electoral district represented in the House of Commons of Canada from 1867 to 1935. It was located in the province of Ontario. It was created by the British North America Act 1867.

In 1882, the North Riding of the county of Oxford was defined to consist of the townships of East Nissouri, West Zorra, East Zorra, Blandford, South Easthope and North Easthope, the town of Woodstock, and the village of Embro.

In 1903, the riding was redefined to exclude the townships of South Easthope and North Easthope, and include the township of Blenheim.

In 1914, the riding was redefined to include the part of the village of Tavistock situated in the township of Zorra East.

The electoral district was abolished in 1933 when it was merged into Oxford riding.

== Members of Parliament ==
This riding has elected the following members of Parliament:

| Parliament | Years | Member | Party |
|---|---|---|---|
North Oxford
| 1st | 1867–1872 | Thomas Oliver | Liberal |
| 2nd | 1872–1874 | Thomas Oliver | Liberal |
| 3rd | 1874–1878 | Thomas Oliver | Liberal |
| 4th | 1878–1880† | Thomas Oliver | Liberal |
| 4th | 1880–1882 | James Sutherland | Liberal |
| 5th | 1882–1887 | James Sutherland | Liberal |
| 6th | 1887–1891 | James Sutherland | Liberal |
| 7th | 1891–1896 | James Sutherland | Liberal |
| 8th | 1896–1900 | James Sutherland | Liberal |
| 9th | 1900–1902 | James Sutherland | Liberal |
| 9th | 1902–1904 | James Sutherland | Liberal |
| 10th | 1904–1905† | James Sutherland | Liberal |
| 10th | 1905–1908 | George Smith | Liberal |
| 11th | 1908–1911 | Edward Walter Nesbitt | Liberal |
| 12th | 1911–1917 | Edward Walter Nesbitt | Liberal |
| 13th | 1917–1921 | Edward Walter Nesbitt | Government (Unionist) |
Oxford North
| 14th | 1921–1925 | Duncan James Sinclair | Liberal |
| 15th | 1925–1926 | Donald Matheson Sutherland | Conservative |
| 16th | 1926–1930 | Hugh Allan | Liberal |
| 17th | 1930–1930 | Donald Matheson Sutherland | Conservative |
| 17th | 1930–1935 | Donald Matheson Sutherland | Conservative |
Riding dissolved into Oxford

== Election history ==
1867 Canadian federal election: North Riding of Oxford
| Party | Candidate | Votes |
|---|---|---|
| Liberal | Thomas Oliver | acclaimed |

1872 Canadian federal election: North Riding of Oxford
| Party | Candidate | Votes |
|---|---|---|
| Liberal | Thomas Oliver | acclaimed |

1874 Canadian federal election: North Riding of Oxford
| Party | Candidate | Votes |
|---|---|---|
| Liberal | Thomas Oliver | 1,866 |
| Unknown | J. H. Wood | 655 |

1878 Canadian federal election: North Riding of Oxford
| Party | Candidate | Votes |
|---|---|---|
| Liberal | Thomas Oliver | 1,706 |
| Unknown | Wood | 803 |

By-election: On Mr. Oliver's death, 9 December 1880 : North Riding of Oxford
| Party | Candidate | Votes |
|---|---|---|
| Liberal | James Sutherland | 1,835 |
| Unknown | G. R. Patullo | 1,465 |

1882 Canadian federal election: North Riding of Oxford
| Party | Candidate | Votes |
|---|---|---|
| Liberal | James Sutherland | 1,469 |
| Unknown | Samuel Towle | 1,044 |
| Unknown | G. R. Patullo | 999 |

1887 Canadian federal election: North Riding of Oxford
| Party | Candidate | Votes |
|---|---|---|
| Liberal | James Sutherland | 2,083 |
| Conservative | J. H. Thrall | 847 |

1891 Canadian federal election: North Riding of Oxford
| Party | Candidate | Votes |
|---|---|---|
| Liberal | James Sutherland | 2,544 |
| Conservative | D. W. Karn | 1,010 |

1896 Canadian federal election: North Riding of Oxford
| Party | Candidate | Votes |
|---|---|---|
| Liberal | James Sutherland | 2,811 |
| Conservative | D. W. Karn | 1,010 |

1900 Canadian federal election: North Riding of Oxford
| Party | Candidate | Votes |
|---|---|---|
| Liberal | Hon. James Sutherland | 2,717 |
| Conservative | James Gamble Wallace | 1,115 |

By-election: On Mr. Sutherland being appointed Minister of Marine and Fisheries, 29 January 1902: North Riding of Oxford
| Party | Candidate | Votes |
|---|---|---|
| Liberal | Hon. J. Sutherland | acclaimed |

1904 Canadian federal election: North Riding of Oxford
| Party | Candidate | Votes |
|---|---|---|
| Liberal | Hon. James Sutherland | 2,768 |
| Conservative | James G. Wallace | 1,266 |

By-election: On Mr. Sutherland's death, 13 June 1905: North Riding of Oxford
| Party | Candidate | Votes |
|---|---|---|
| Liberal | George Smith | 2,845 |
| Conservative | J. G. Wallace | 2,507 |

1908 Canadian federal election: North Riding of Oxford
| Party | Candidate | Votes |
|---|---|---|
| Liberal | Edward Walter Nesbitt | 2,675 |
| Conservative | Daniel Quinn | 2,551 |

1911 Canadian federal election: North Riding of Oxford
| Party | Candidate | Votes |
|---|---|---|
| Liberal | Edward Walter Nesbitt | 2,898 |
| Conservative | James Gamble Wallace | 2,603 |

1917 Canadian federal election: North Riding of Oxford
| Party | Candidate | Votes |
|---|---|---|
| Government | Edward Walter Nesbitt | 3,836 |
| Opposition | Donald Matheson Sutherland | 3,074 |

1921 Canadian federal election: North Riding of Oxford
| Party | Candidate | Votes |
|---|---|---|
| Liberal | Duncan James Sinclair | 4,213 |
| Conservative | Edward Walter Nesbitt | 4,053 |
| Progressive | John Hugh Lillico | 3,857 |

1925 Canadian federal election: Oxford North
| Party | Candidate | Votes |
|---|---|---|
| Conservative | Donald Matheson Sutherland | 6,243 |
| Liberal | Duncan James Sinclair | 5,660 |

1926 Canadian federal election: Oxford North
| Party | Candidate | Votes |
|---|---|---|
| Liberal | Hugh Allan | 6,565 |
| Conservative | Donald Matheson Sutherland | 6,193 |

1930 Canadian federal election: Oxford North
| Party | Candidate | Votes |
|---|---|---|
| Conservative | Donald Matheson Sutherland | 7,217 |
| Liberal | Hugh Allan | 6,180 |

By-election: Acceptance by Donald M. Sutherland of an office of emolument under the Crown, 25 August 1930: Oxford North
| Party | Candidate | Votes |
|---|---|---|
| Conservative | Hon. Donald Matheson Sutherland | acclaimed |

== See also ==
- List of Canadian electoral districts
- Historical federal electoral districts of Canada
