= Ebenezer Vining Bodwell =

Canadian politician

Ebenezer Bodwell
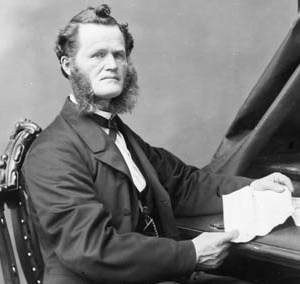
- Bodwell in 1868

Member of Parliament for South Riding of Oxford
- In office 1867–1874
- Preceded by: Riding established

Personal details
- Born: 30 April 1827 Nissouri, Ontario, Upper Canada
- Died: 18 October 1889 (aged 62) Morley, Alberta, Northwest Territories
- Relations: Garth Turner (great-grandson)
- Education: University of Wisconsin

Ebenezer Vining Bodwell (30 April 1827 – 18 October 1889) was an Ontario businessman and political figure. He represented Oxford South in the House of Commons of Canada as a Liberal member from 1867 to 1874. His great-grandson, Garth Turner, is a former Canadian Member of Parliament and former cabinet minister.

He was born in Nissouri Township in Middlesex County, Upper Canada in 1827 and later moved to a farm in Dereham Township with his family. He studied at the University of Wisconsin–Madison. Bodwell served as clerk and treasurer for the township, later becoming a member of the township council, then reeve and later warden for Oxford County. He married Esther D. Crandon.

After the death of George Skeffington Connor in 1863, Bodwell ran in the by-election for the Legislative Assembly of the Province of Canada but was defeated by George Brown. In the 1867 Canadian federal election, he was elected to the House of Commons of the 1st Canadian Parliament from the South Riding of Oxford. In 1875, Bodwell was appointed superintendent for the Welland Canal and served until 1879, when he was named government accountant for the Canadian Pacific Railway and sent to British Columbia. In 1887, he moved to Vancouver. He was the second president of the Vancouver Board of Trade. Bodwell died at Morley, Northwest Territories in 1889.

1867 Canadian federal election: Oxford South
Party	Candidate	Votes
Liberal	Ebenezer Bodwell	acclaimed
Source: Canadian Elections Database

1872 Canadian federal election: Oxford South
Party	Candidate	Votes
Liberal–Conservative	Ebenezer Vining Bodwell	acclaimed
Source: Canadian Elections Database

1874 Canadian federal election: South Riding of Oxford
Party	Candidate	Votes
Liberal	Ebenezer V. Bodwell	981
Unknown	Dr. Thrall	223
