= Dave MacKenzie (politician) =

Canadian politician

David MacKenzie

Member of Parliament for Oxford
- In office June 28, 2004 – January 28, 2023
- Preceded by: John Baird Finlay
- Succeeded by: Arpan Khanna

Chair of the Standing Committee on Justice
- In office June 21, 2011 – February 3, 2013
- Minister: Rob Nicholson
- Preceded by: Ed Fast
- Succeeded by: Mike Wallace (politician)

Personal details
- Born: June 12, 1946 (age 79) London, Ontario, Canada
- Party: Conservative
- Spouse: Lynda MacKenzie
- Children: Deb Tait
- Profession: police officer

David MacKenzie (born June 12, 1946) is a Canadian politician. He is a former member of the House of Commons of Canada, representing the riding of Oxford, Ontario as a Conservative from 2004 to 2023.

== Career ==
Born in London, Ontario, MacKenzie served with the Woodstock City Police from 1967 to 1997, and was Chief of Police from 1987 to 1997. In 1997, he became the General Manager of Roetin Industries Canada.

He first ran for parliament in the federal election of 1997 as a Progressive Conservative, losing to Liberal John Finlay by 1,575 votes. He ran again in the election of 2000, and lost to Finlay by roughly the same margin. The national Progressive Conservative Party had a weak organization in Ontario during this period, and that Mackenzie's vote totals were well above the party's provincial average and that in both 1997 and 2000, the right wing vote was split between the Progressive Conservatives and Reform who later became the Canadian Alliance.

In 2002, MacKenzie was the Bosnia and Herzegovina trainer for the National Democratic Institute in Washington, D.C.

The Progressive Conservatives merged with the Canadian Alliance as the Conservative Party of Canada in early 2004, and Mackenzie joined the new party. Finlay did not run in the 2004 election, and MacKenzie defeated new Liberal candidate Murray Coulter by about 6,500 votes. After the election, he was named as his party's associate critic for National Defence. In the 2006 federal election, MacKenzie was re-elected to his Oxford seat, beating Liberal candidate Greig Mordue by a wide margin. With the Conservative Party of Canada forming a minority government, MacKenzie was selected as parliamentary secretary for the Ministry of Public Safety.

In December 2022, MacKenzie announced that he would retire as MP by the end of January 2023. In February 2023, Mackenzie sent a letter to Anthony Rota, Speaker of the house, Caroline Simard, Commissioner of Election Canada, Robert Batherson, president of the Conservative Party, Kevin Price, chair of the party's candidate selection committee, and Mike Crase, the executive director of the party, arguing that the party violated their own nomination rules by allegedly supporting Arpan Khanna to be the party nominee. Mackenzie believes that Andrew Scheer violated House of Commons rules by parliamentary resources to record the endorsement video for Khanna. MacKenzie also questioned Khanna ties to the riding since Khanna was also the party candidate for Brampton North during the 2019 election. Mackenize's daughter, Deb Tait is also running for the party nomination. Tait lost to Khanna, and MacKenzie is backing David Hilderley, who is running for the Liberal Nomination, by arguing that the Conservative Party operates differently from Stephen Harper or Peter Mackay.

The by-election to replace him in parliament is scheduled for June 19, 2023. Citing concerns with the Conservative nomination process, MacKenzie endorsed Liberal candidate David Hilderley.

== Electoral record ==
2021 Canadian federal election: Oxford
Party	Candidate	Votes	%	±%	Expenditures
Conservative	Dave MacKenzie	29,146	47.05	-1.09	$32,605.67
Liberal	Elizabeth Quinto	12,720	20.53	+1.24	$25,550.39
New Democratic	Matthew Chambers	11,325	18.28	-1.93	$3,373.85
People's	Wendy Martin	6,595	10.65	+7.73	$15,390.08
Green	Bob Reid	1,683	2.72	-5.12	$0.00
Christian Heritage	Allen Scovil	479	0.77	-0.85	$5,613.11
Total valid votes/expense limit		61,948	99.39	–	$123,152.84
Total rejected ballots		379	0.61	-0.25	
Turnout		62,327	64.89	-1.04	
Eligible voters		96,055			
Conservative hold		Swing		-1.17	
Source: Elections Canada

2019 Canadian federal election: Oxford
Party	Candidate	Votes	%	±%	Expenditures
Conservative	Dave MacKenzie	29,310	48.14	+2.46	$49,710.46
New Democratic	Matthew Chambers	12,306	20.21	+3.66	none listed
Liberal	Brendan Knight	11,745	19.29	-12.90	$3,866.13
Green	Lisa Birtch-Carriere	4,770	7.83	+4.31	none listed
People's	Wendy Martin	1,774	2.91	-	$6,624.90
Christian Heritage	Melody Aldred	986	1.62	-0.45	$3,632.07
Total valid votes/expense limit		60,891	99.14	–	
Total rejected ballots		528	0.86	+0.44	
Turnout		61,419	65.92	-2.00	
Eligible voters		93,166			
Conservative hold		Swing		-0.60	
Source: Elections Canada

2015 Canadian federal election
Party	Candidate	Votes	%	±%	Expenditures
Conservative	Dave MacKenzie	25,966	45.7	-13.27	–
Liberal	Don McKay	18,299	32.2	+22.66	–
New Democratic	Zoe Kunschner	9,406	16.5	-8.95	–
Green	Mike Farlow	2,004	3.5	-0.83	–
Christian Heritage	Melody Ann Aldred	1,175	2.1	+0.49	–
Total valid votes/Expense limit		56,850	100.0		$220,268.26
Total rejected ballots		241	–	–	
Turnout		57,041	68.36	+6.16	
Eligible voters		83,431			
Conservative hold		Swing		-17.96	
Source: Elections Canada

2011 Canadian federal election
Party	Candidate	Votes	%	±%	Expenditures
Conservative	Dave MacKenzie	27,973	58.90	+6.23	$56,267
New Democratic	Paul Arsenault	12,164	25.61	+7.59	$14,065
Liberal	Tim Lobzun	4,521	9.52	-9.86	$13,495
Green	Mike Farlow	2,058	4.33	-3.24	$12,611
Christian Heritage	John Markus	776	1.63	-0.70	$1,478
Total valid votes/Expense limit		47,492	100.00		$85,881.86
Total rejected ballots		179	0.38	-0.05	
Turnout		47,671	62.60	+3.58	
Eligible voters		76,149	–	–	

2008 Canadian federal election
Party	Candidate	Votes	%	±%	Expenditures
Conservative	Dave MacKenzie	23,330	52.67	+6.13	$57,473
Liberal	Martha Dennis	8,586	19.38	-8.70	$50,017
New Democratic	Diane Abbott	7,982	18.02	+0.65	$9,242
Green	Cathy Mott	3,355	7.57	+4.43	$2,819
Christian Heritage	Shaun MacDonald	1,036	2.33	-0.55	$14,229
Total valid votes/Expense limit		44,289	100.00	$82,866	
Total rejected ballots		145	0.33	-	
Turnout		44,434	59.02		
Conservative hold		Swing		+7.4	

2006 Canadian federal election
Party	Candidate	Votes	%	±%
Conservative	Dave MacKenzie	23,140	46.54	+1.6
Liberal	Greig Mordue	13,961	28.08	-2.4
New Democratic	Zoé Dorcas Kunschner	8,639	17.37	+2.9
Green	Ronnee Sykes	1,566	3.14	-1.2
Christian Heritage	John Markus	1,434	2.88	-0.4
Marijuana	James Bender	771	1.55	-0.1
Libertarian	Kaye Sargent	204	0.41	-0.1
Total valid votes		49,715	100.00	
Total rejected ballots		164	0.33	
Turnout		49,879	67.14	

2004 Canadian federal election
Party	Candidate	Votes	%	±%
Conservative	Dave MacKenzie	20,606	44.9	-12.5
Liberal	Murray Coulter	14,011	30.5	-5.0
New Democratic	Zoé Dorcas Kunschner	6,673	14.5	-5.3
Green	Irene Tietz	1,951	4.3	
Christian Heritage	Leslie Bartley	1,534	3.3	
Marijuana	James Bender	794	1.7	
Libertarian	Kaye Sargent	226	0.5	
Canadian Action	Alex Kreider	108	0.2	-0.3
Total valid votes		45,903	100.0	

Note: Conservative vote is compared to the total of the Canadian Alliance vote and Progressive Conservative vote in 2000 election.

2000 Canadian federal election
Party	Candidate	Votes	%	±%
Liberal	John Baird Finlay	15,181	35.6	-0.4
Progressive Conservative	Dave MacKenzie	13,050	30.6	-1.9
Alliance	Patricia Smith	11,455	26.8	+5.8
New Democratic	Shawn Rouse	2,254	5.3	-2.2
Independent	John Thomas Markus	536	1.3	
Canadian Action	Alex Kreider	227	0.5	+0.1
Total valid votes		42,703	100.0	

Note: Canadian Alliance vote is compared to the Reform vote in 1997 election.

1997 Canadian federal election
Party	Candidate	Votes	%	±%
Liberal	John Baird Finlay	16,281	36.0	-4.9
Progressive Conservative	Dave MacKenzie	14,706	32.5	+10.1
Reform	Bill Irvine	9,533	21.1	-5.7
New Democratic	Martin Donlevy	3,406	7.5	+2.5
Christian Heritage	John Zekveld	956	2.1	+0.1
Canadian Action	Alex Kreider	192	0.4	
Natural Law	Jim Morris	181	0.4	-0.1
Total valid votes		45,255	100.0	
