= Edward Walter Nesbitt =

Canadian politician

Edward Walter Nesbitt (November 23, 1859 – August 28, 1942) was a Canadian insurance and real estate agent and political figure in Ontario, Canada. He represented Oxford North in the House of Commons of Canada from 1908 to 1917 as a Liberal and from 1917 to 1921 as a Unionist Party member.

He was born in Holbrook, Canada West, the son of John W. Nesbitt and Mary Wallace, and was educated in Oxford County. Nesbitt married Mary Elizabeth Ross in 1897. He lived in Woodstock. In 1921, Nesbitt crossed the floor of the House of Commons to become a Conservative; he was defeated when he ran for reelection later that year. He died in Woodstock at the age of 82.

His grand-nephew Wally Nesbitt also later served in the House of Commons.
