= Donald Matheson Sutherland =

Canadian politician

The Honourable Donald Sutherland PC
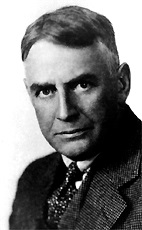

Minister of National Defence
- In office 7 August 1930 – 16 November 1934
- Prime Minister: Richard Bedford Bennett
- Preceded by: James Ralston
- Succeeded by: Grote Stirling

Personal details
- Born: 3 December 1879 Norwich, Ontario, Canada
- Died: 4 June 1970 (aged 90) Woodstock, Ontario, Canada

Military service
- Allegiance: Canada
- Branch/service: Canadian Expeditionary Force
- Years of service: 1908-1918
- Rank: Lieutenant Colonel
- Unit: 1st Battalion (Ontario Regiment), CEF
- Commands: 52nd Battalion (New Ontario), CEF
- Battles/wars: World War I

Donald Matheson Sutherland, PC (3 December 1879 – 4 June 1970) was a Canadian physician and politician.

== Biography ==
He ran for public office, as a Laurier Liberal, in the 1917 federal election held as a result of the Conscription Crisis of 1917, but was defeated in the riding of Oxford North.

By 1921, he had changed allegiances to the Conservatives and, in the 1925 general election, won the seat of Oxford North and became a Tory Member of Parliament in the House of Commons of Canada. He was defeated, however, in the 1926 general election which returned the Liberals under William Lyon Mackenzie King to power following the King-Byng Affair.

Sutherland returned to Parliament as a result of the 1930 general election which was won by the Conservatives under R. B. Bennett. Bennett appointed Matheson to Cabinet as Minister of National Defence. In 1934, with the country reeling from the Great Depression, Bennett, as prime minister, instituted his own version of Franklin D. Roosevelt's New Deal. He appointed Sutherland as Minister of Pensions and National Health. Bennett's reforms were insufficient to appease an unruly electorate, however, and the Bennett government was defeated in the 1935 general election. Sutherland lost his own parliamentary seat.
