= Wally Nesbitt =

Canadian politician

Wallace Bickford (Wally) Nesbitt

Member of Parliament for Oxford
- In office August 1953 – December 1973

Personal details
- Born: 7 August 1918 Woodstock, Ontario
- Died: 21 December 1973 (aged 55) Woodstock, Ontario
- Party: Progressive Conservative
- Profession: Barrister, Lawyer

Wallace Bickford Nesbitt (7 August 1918 – 21 December 1973) was a Progressive Conservative member of the House of Commons of Canada. He was born in Woodstock, Ontario and became a barrister and lawyer by career.

During World War II, Nesbitt served with the Royal Canadian Navy between 1941 and 1945. After studies at Woodstock Collegiate Institute, the University of Western Ontario and Osgoode Hall Law School, he formally became a lawyer in 1947, then in 1954 was appointed Queen's Counsel.

He was first elected at Ontario's Oxford riding in the 1953 general election and was re-elected there for eight successive terms. He attended the 12th General Assembly of the United Nations (UN) as the head of the Canadian delegation and in 1959 became first vice-president of that Assembly. Until 1968, Nesbitt continued to represent Canada at the UN.

After a heart attack on 2 December 1973, Nesbitt was treated at Woodstock General Hospital where he died 19 days later, cutting short his political life during the 29th Canadian Parliament.

Nesbitt's great-uncle, Edward Walter Nesbitt, was also a member of Parliament for Oxford between 1911 and 1921.
