= Erwin E. Smith =

American photographer (1886–1947)

Erwin Evans Smith
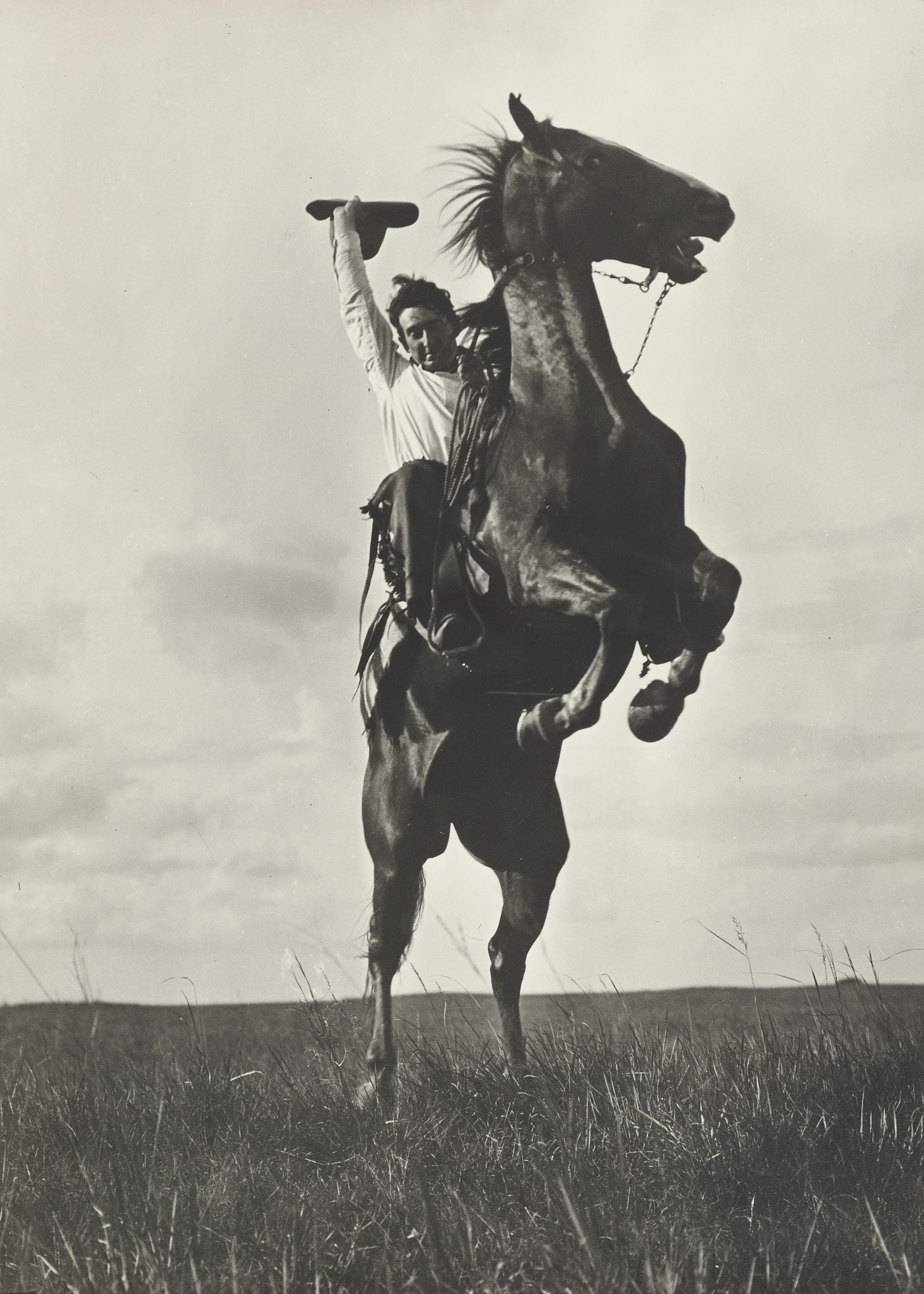
- Born: August 22, 1886; Honey Grove, Texas
- Died: September 4, 1947 (aged 61); Bonham, Texas
- Resting place: Oakwood Cemetery, Honey Grove, Texas
- Education: School of the Art Institute of Chicago (1905–1907); School of the Boston Museum of Fine Arts (1907–1910)

Erwin Evans Smith (August 22, 1886 – September 4, 1947) was an American photographer who used the medium to document the waning years of open-range cowboy life in the American West. During his lifetime, he was recognized as having "brought together with the camera the most complete account of the passing west that has ever been made."

== Early life ==
Smith was born in Honey Grove, Texas, to Albert Alexander Smith and Nancy Erwin Smith White. Smith's father died of pneumonia when the boy was not yet four years old, and when his mother remarried in 1894, she relocated the family to Bonham, Texas, where Smith would spend his childhood years. While very young, Smith exhibited an intense artistic sensibility: "I developed a strong desire to sketch and create something at an early age," he recalled. "I was everlastingly sketching or modeling in clay."

Smith's early creative tendency was paralleled by a second passion, that of being a cowboy. While Bonham and its surroundings were primarily a farming region during Smith's lifetime, the area had also been home to legendary cattlemen like John Chisum, and around town the young boy dressed to look like Bonham's forebears, wearing what one friend later recalled as a "nine-year-old boy's terrific adaptation of what his vivid imagination tells him cowboys wear."

When Smith was four years old, the Eleventh United States Census of 1890 declared the American frontier closed, prompting historian Frederick Jackson Turner to write his famous Frontier Thesis, in which he wrote that "Now, four centuries from the discovery of America, at the end of a hundred years of life under the Constitution, the frontier has gone, and with its going has closed the first period of American history." As a teenager, Smith realized that the cowboys who worked the open range were, like the frontier itself, receding into the past. But from his experience as an apprentice cowhand during these years, he knew of a few isolated West Texas locales where vast ranches yet survived, barbed wire and the railroads were still scarce, and cowboys still worked the open range. Moved by nostalgia, he determined to capture them in their elements before it was too late. "My only means now to set them before my eyes and the public's once more is to place them on canvas with paint and brush," Smith resolved. But his unstudied artistic skills as a painter and sculptor compelled him to opt for a more immediate tool of record: the camera.

== Career ==
Smith is purported to have acquired his first camera in 1898 at the age of twelve, and by the age of fifteen he had begun carrying it with him on his visits to Texas ranches. Following a visit to the 1904 World's Fair in Saint Louis, he decided to pursue formal art study with the intent to become a painter and sculptor; he left for Chicago that year to study with Lorado Taft (1860-1936) at the School of the Art Institute of Chicago. In 1908 he headed east to Boston, where he continued his study with Bela Lyon Pratt (1867-1917) at the School of the Museum of Fine Arts. But Smith spent his summers photographing on ranches throughout West Texas and parts of New Mexico and Arizona, and by 1911 he had turned his full artistic attention onto photography and returned to Texas to practice in that medium exclusively. His goal was "to do with his photography what Charles M. Russell did with his painting: to maintain a sense of documentary realism by being truthful to the world with work created in an artistically pleasing way." "He wanted to illustrate the entire cowboy culture," an article in 2008 asserted, "to clarify all the varied responsibilities and define the characteristic techniques of managing cattle, as well as to showcase the unique talents of the legendary men and horses."

Soon after Smith had begun his studies in Boston in 1907, he discovered the Pinkham & Smith Company, which sold cameras and photographic goods. Within a few weeks, company representatives there had become acquainted with Smith's work and arranged an exhibition of forty of his prints in their street-display windows on Boylston Street. Smith's photographic career was significantly advanced when George Patullo, a features writer for the Boston Herald, saw the works, contacted Smith at his boarding house, and made him the subject of an article: "From Bronco Buster to Boston Art Student," which appeared on the front page of the paper's magazine section on January 12, 1908. The article marked the beginning of a friendship and working relationship between Smith the photographer and Patullo the writer, a partnership that resulted in numerous illustrated articles published in popular magazines from 1908 to 1911, when they collaborated for the final time on two Saturday Evening Post articles on the Texas horse and mule business.

Over the course of his relatively brief career making photographs, Smith's principal camera was an Eastman screen-focus Kodak fitted with a Goerz lens with a volute shutter. As both a cowhand and photographer, he rode with some of the largest outfits in the West, ranches like the Shoe Box, JA, Frying Pan, Matador, and LS, which with their vast sizes still approximated what the open range had been like. In 1914 he returned to Texas to begin ranching on his own, but by 1917 he was bankrupt; his artistic life faded once his range-riding days were over, and he spent his remaining years at his home outside Bonham.

== Death and legacy ==
In July 1947 Smith was diagnosed with pancreatic cancer, which claimed his life two months later at the age of sixty-one. The photographer's will named his sister, Mary Alice Pettis (1906–1986), as beneficiary and executor of his estate. In 1949, Pettis deposited 1,800 of the photographer's negatives with the Library of Congress but retained several hundred images related to home and family. Upon her death, Pettis bequeathed Smith's entire body of work, including the inventory on loan to the Library of Congress, to the Amon Carter Museum of American Art in Fort Worth, Texas. The collection comprises over 2,000 negatives and more than 700 vintage prints, as well as Smith's personal papers and library. Today, Smith is counted among the most important photographers of cowboy life and the finest of his kind to have worked in Texas.
