= Donald Sutherland (politician) =

Canadian politician

The Honourable Donald Sutherland

Canadian Senator from Ontario
- In office 1935–1949
- Appointed by: R. B. Bennett

Member of Parliament for Oxford South
- In office 1911–1926
- Preceded by: Malcolm Smith Schell
- Succeeded by: Thomas Merritt Cayley

Ontario MPP
- In office 1902–1908
- Preceded by: Angus McKay
- Succeeded by: Thomas Richard Mayberry
- Constituency: Oxford South

Personal details
- Born: April 8, 1863 Zorra Township, Canada West
- Died: January 1, 1949 (aged 85) Ottawa, Ontario, Canada
- Party: Conservative; Progressive Conservative
- Other political affiliations: Conservative
- Occupation: Farmer
- Cabinet: Minister without portfolio (1926)

Donald Sutherland, PC (April 8, 1863 – January 1, 1949) was a Canadian politician.

== Background ==
Born in Zorra Township, Canada West, he was first ran for the House of Commons of Canada in the riding of Oxford South in the 1908 federal election. He was defeated but was elected in the 1911 federal election. A Conservative, he was re-elected in 1917, 1921, and 1925. He was defeated in 1926, 1930, and in a 1934 by-election. In 1926, he was a Minister without Portfolio in the short lived cabinet of Arthur Meighen. In 1935, he was called to the Senate of Canada to represent the senatorial division of Oxford, Ontario. He died while in office in 1949.

== Electoral record ==
1908 Canadian federal election: South Riding of Oxford
Party	Candidate	Votes
Liberal	Malcolm Smith Schell	2,712
Conservative	Donald Sutherland	2,619

1911 Canadian federal election: South Riding of Oxford
Party	Candidate	Votes
Conservative	Donald Sutherland	2,503
Liberal	Malcolm Smith Schell	2,479

1917 Canadian federal election: South Riding of Oxford
Party	Candidate	Votes
Government	Donald Sutherland	4,124
Opposition	Malcolm Smith Schell	2,812

1921 Canadian federal election: South Riding of Oxford
Party	Candidate	Votes
Conservative	Donald Sutherland	4,476
Progressive	Martin Lee Haley	3,597
Liberal	Matthew Dean	3,135

1925 Canadian federal election: Oxford South
Party	Candidate	Votes
Conservative	Donald Sutherland	5,400
Liberal	James William Innes	5,200

1926 Canadian federal election: Oxford South
Party	Candidate	Votes
Liberal	Thomas Merritt Cayley	6,064
Conservative	Hon. Donald Sutherland	5,364
