= Ontario Liberal Party candidates in the 2011 Ontario provincial election =

The Ontario Liberal Party is one of three major political parties in Ontario, Canada running in the 2011 Ontario provincial election. The Ontario Liberals, who had governed the province since 2003, formed a minority government in the Legislative Assembly of Ontario with 37 percent of the vote.

Riding	Candidate's Name	Notes	Residence	Occupation	Votes	%	Rank
Ajax—Pickering	Joe Dickson			Owner, Dickson Printing (Ajax)	19,606	47.34%	1
Algoma—Manitoulin	Mike Brown				7,405	28.47%	2
Ancaster—Dundas—Flamborough—Westdale	Ted McMeekin				21,646	43.7%	1
Barrie	Karl Walsh				14,995	34.81	2
Beaches—East York	Helen Burstyn				13,813	36.17%	2
Bramalea—Gore—Malton	Kuldip Kular						
Brampton—Springdale	Linda Jeffrey						
Brampton West	Vic Dhillon						
Brant	Dave Levac						
Bruce—Grey—Owen Sound	Kevin Eccles						
Burlington	Karmel Sakran						
Cambridge	Kathryn McGarry						
Carleton—Mississippi Mills	Megan Cornell				19,144	34.08%	2
Chatham-Kent—Essex	Paul Watson						
Davenport	Cristina Martins						
Don Valley East	Michael Coteau						
Don Valley West	Kathleen Wynne						
Dufferin—Caledon	Lori Holloway						
Durham	Betty Somerville						
Eglinton—Lawrence	Mike Colle						
Elgin—Middlesex—London	Lori Baldwin-Sands						
Essex	Ken Schmidt						
Etobicoke Centre	Donna Cansfield						
Etobicoke—Lakeshore	Laurel Broten						
Etobicoke North	Shafiq Qaadri						
Glengarry—Prescott—Russell	Grant Crack						
Guelph	Liz Sandals						
Haldimand—Norfolk	Greg Crone						
Haliburton—Kawartha Lakes—Brock	Rick Johnson						
Halton	Indira Naidoo-Harris						
Hamilton Centre	Donna Tiqui-Shebib						
Hamilton East—Stoney Creek	Mark Cripps						
Hamilton Mountain	Sophia Aggelonitis						
Huron—Bruce	Carol Mitchell						
Kenora—Rainy River	Anthony Leek				2,202	9.9%	3
Kingston and the Islands	John Gerretsen						
Kitchener Centre	John Milloy						
Kitchener—Conestoga	Leeanna Pendergast						
Kitchener—Waterloo	Eric Davis						
Lambton—Kent—Middlesex	Maria Van Bommel						
Lanark—Frontenac—Lennox and Addington	Bill MacDonald						
Leeds—Grenville	Ray Heffernan						
London—Fanshawe	Khalil Ramal						
London North Centre	Deb Matthews						
London West	Chris Bentley						
Markham—Unionville	Michael Chan						
Mississauga—Brampton South	Amrit Mangat						
Mississauga East—Cooksville	Dipika Damerla						
Mississauga—Erindale	Harinder Takhar						
Mississauga South	Charles Sousa						
Mississauga—Streetsville	Bob Delaney						
Nepean—Carleton	Don Dransfield						
Newmarket—Aurora	Christina Bisanz						
Niagara Falls	Kim Craitor						
Niagara West—Glanbrook	Katie Trombetta						
Nickel Belt	Tony Ryma						
Nipissing	Catherine Whiting						
Northumberland—Quinte West	Lou Rinaldi						
Oak Ridges—Markham	Helena Jaczek						
Oakville	Kevin Flynn						
Oshawa	Jacquie Menezes						
Ottawa Centre	Yasir Naqvi						
Ottawa—Orléans	Phil McNeely						
Ottawa South	Dalton McGuinty						
Ottawa Vanier	Madeleine Meilleur						
Ottawa West—Nepean	Bob Chiarelli						
Oxford	David Hilderley						
Parkdale—High Park	Cortney Pasternak						
Parry Sound—Muskoka	Cindy Waters						
Perth—Wellington	John Wilkinson						
Peterborough	Jeff Leal						
Pickering—Scarborough East	Tracy MacCharles						
Prince Edward—Hastings	Leona Dombrowsky						
Renfrew—Nipissing—Pembroke	John O'Leary						
Richmond Hill	Reza Moridi						
St. Catharines	Jim Bradley						
St. Paul's	Eric Hoskins						
Sarnia—Lambton	Stephanie Barry						
Sault Ste. Marie	David Orazietti						
Scarborough—Agincourt	Soo Wong						
Scarborough Centre	Brad Duguid						
Scarborough—Guildwood	Margarett Best						
Scarborough—Rouge River	Bas Balkissoon						
Scarborough Southwest	Lorenzo Berardinetti						
Simcoe—Grey	Donna Kenwell						
Simcoe North	Fred Larsen						
Stormont—Dundas—South Glengarry	Mark MacDonald						
Sudbury	Rick Bartolucci						
Thornhill	Bernie Farber						
Thunder Bay—Atikokan	Bill Mauro						
Thunder Bay—Superior North	Michael Gravelle						
Timiskaming—Cochrane	Denis Bonin						
Timmins—James Bay	Leonard Rickard						
Toronto Centre	Glen Murray						
Toronto—Danforth	Marisa Sterling						
Trinity—Spadina	Sarah Thomson						
Vaughan	Greg Sorbara						
Welland	Benoit Mercier						
Wellington—Halton Hills	Moya Johnson						
Whitby—Oshawa	Elizabeth Roy						
Willowdale	David Zimmer						
Windsor—Tecumseh	Dwight Duncan						
Windsor West	Teresa Piruzza						
York Centre	Monte Kwinter						
York—Simcoe	Gloria Reszler						
York South—Weston	Laura Albanese						
York West	Mario Sergio						

== By-elections ==
Riding	Candidate's Name	Notes	Residence	Occupation	Votes	%	Rank
Vaughan	Steven Del Duca	By-election on September 6, 2012 due to the resignation of Greg Sorbara.			16,469	51.37	1
Kitchener—Waterloo	Eric Davis	By-election on September 6, 2012 due to the resignation of Elizabeth Witmer.			11,194	23.99	3
London West	Ken Coran	By-election on August 1, 2013 due to the resignation of Chris Bentley.			5,866	15.85	3
Windsor—Tecumseh	Jeewen Gill	By-election on August 1, 2013 due to the resignation of Dwight Duncan.			3,057	11.94	3
Ottawa South	John Fraser	By-election on August 1, 2013 due to the resignation of Dalton McGuinty.			14,925	42.34	1
Etobicoke—Lakeshore	Peter Milczyn	By-election on August 1, 2013 due to the resignation of Laurel Broten.		Toronto City Councillor	14,513	41.96	2
Scarborough—Guildwood	Mitzie Hunter	By-election on August 1, 2013 due to the resignation of Margarett Best.			8,852	35.83	1
Niagara Falls	Joyce Morocco	By-election on February 13, 2014 due to the resignation of Kim Craitor.		Niagara Falls City Councillor	7,143	19.39	3
Thornhill	Sandra Yeung Racco	By-election on February 13, 2014 due to the resignation of Peter Shurman.			11,592	41.50	2
