= List of members of the Canadian House of Commons with military service (K) =

Name	Elected party	Constituency	Elected date	Military service
Charles Edwin Kaulbach	Conservative	Lunenburg	September 17, 1878	Militia
Bill Kempling	Progressive Conservative	Halton—Wentworth	October 30, 1972	Royal Canadian Air Force (1940-1945)
William Walker Kennedy	Conservative	Winnipeg South Centre	October 29, 1925	Canadian Army (1914-1918)
Wajid Khan	Liberal	Mississauga—Streetsville	June 28, 2004	Pakistan Air Force (1966-1973)
Thomas Ashmore Kidd	Progressive Conservative	Kingston City	June 11, 1945	Canadian Army (1915)
Eric William Kierans	Liberal	Duvernay	June 25, 1968	Canadian Army (1942-1945)
Alexandre Edouard Kierzkowski	Liberal	St. Hyacynthe	September 20, 1867	Militia, Polish Army (1931)
Fred King	Progressive Conservative	Okanagan—Similkameen	May 22, 1979	Royal Canadian Air Force (1942-1946)
John James Kinley	Liberal	Queens—Lunenburg	October 14, 1935	Canadian Army
John Angus Kirk	Liberal	Guysborough	January 22, 1874	Militia
Bill Knowles	Progressive Conservative	Norfolk—Haldimand	June 25, 1968	Canadian Army
Margaret Konantz	Liberal	Winnipeg South	April 8, 1963	Canadian Army
John Kucherepa	Progressive Conservative	High Park	June 10, 1957	Canadian Army (1943-1946)
