= Paddy Torsney =

Canadian politician

Member of Parliament for Burlington
- In office October 25, 1993 – January 23, 2006
- Preceded by: Bill Kempling
- Succeeded by: Mike Wallace

Personal details
- Born: December 19, 1962 (age 63) Burlington, Ontario, Canada
- Party: Liberal
- Education: McGill University
- Occupation: politician, administrator

Patricia Ann "Paddy" Torsney, PC (born December 19, 1962) is a Canadian politician. She is a former member of the House of Commons of Canada, having represented the riding of Burlington for the Liberal Party through the premierships of Jean Chretien and Paul Martin.

Torsney was educated at McGill University in Montreal, receiving a Bachelor of Commerce degree in 1985. From 1985 to 1989, she worked as a special assistant to the office of David Peterson, the Liberal Premier of Ontario. Torsney then worked as a Senior Consultant to the firm of Hill and Knowlton from 1989 to 1993.

== Political Career ==
Torsney was first elected to parliament in the election of 1993, defeating her closest opponent, Progressive Conservative Mike Kuegle, by almost 10,000 votes. The Progressive Conservatives had previously held the riding since 1972, under retiring Member of Parliament (MP) Bill Kempling.

The PCs under Jean Charest targeted Burlington in the 1997 election, but Torsney again defeated Kuegle by just over 3,500 votes. She won an easier victory in the 2000 election, against a more divided opposition.

The newly formed Conservative Party of Canada made a strong bid for the riding in the 2004 election, running local councillor Mike Wallace against Torsney. Most observers believed that Torsney would lose. However, a last-minute resurgence in Liberal support resulted in a 4,000-vote victory. In the 2006 election, she again faced off against Wallace, losing to him by 2,570 votes. In the 2008 election Torsney lost to Wallace by 9,027 votes.

Torsney was the Parliamentary Secretary to the Minister of the Environment from 1998 to 2000. On July 20, 2004, she was appointed Parliamentary Secretary to the Minister of International Cooperation.

In 2002, Torsney chaired a committee which recommended several changes to Canada's drug laws, including the decriminalization of small amounts of marijuana.

Torsney was President of Canadian group of the Inter-Parliamentary Union, and has worked for the worldwide abolition of land mines. She is also a former board member of UNICEF Canada.

In 2007, Liberal Party of Canada Leader, Stéphane Dion, appointed Torsney as Deputy Principal Secretary in the Office of the Leader of the Opposition. She resigned from the position in April 2008.

== Electoral record ==
2008 Canadian federal election: Burlington
Party	Candidate	Votes	%	±%	Expenditures
Conservative	Mike Wallace	28,614	48.60	+5.50	$82,440
Liberal	Paddy Torsney	19,577	33.25	-5.86	$86,026
New Democratic	David Carter Laird	6,597	11.20	-1.24	$21,862
Green	Marnie Mellish	4,083	6.93	+1.60	$2,280
Total valid votes/expense limit		58,871	100.00	–	$92,099
Total rejected ballots		239	0.40	+0.05	
Turnout		59,110	64.99		

2006 Canadian federal election: Burlington
Party	Candidate	Votes	%	±%
Conservative	Mike Wallace	28,030	43.10	+4.8
Liberal	Paddy Torsney	25,431	39.11	-5.9
New Democratic	David Carter Laird	8,090	12.44	+1.6
Green	Rick Goldring	3,471	5.33	+0.1
Total valid votes		65,022	100.0	
Total rejected ballots		227	0.35	
Turnout		65,249	72.96	

2004 Canadian federal election: Burlington
Party	Candidate	Votes	%	±%
Liberal	Paddy Torsney	27,423	45.0	-1.8
Conservative	Mike Wallace	23,389	38.4	-9.6
New Democratic	David Carter Laird	6,581	10.8	+7.2
Green	Angela Reid	3,169	5.2	
Christian Heritage	John Herman Wubs	429	0.7	
Total valid votes		60,991	100.0	

Note: Conservative vote is compared to the total of the Canadian Alliance vote and Progressive Conservative vote in 2000 election.

2000 Canadian federal election: Burlington
Party	Candidate	Votes	%	±%
Liberal	Paddy Torsney	22,175	46.8	+2.7
Alliance	Don Pennell	11,500	24.3	+6.9
Progressive Conservative	Stephen Collinson	11,240	23.7	-9.0
New Democratic	Larry McMahon	1,722	3.6	-1.5
Green	Tom Snyder	771	1.6	
Total valid votes		47,408	100.0	

Note: Canadian Alliance vote is compared to the Reform vote in 1997 election.

1997 Canadian federal election: Burlington
Party	Candidate	Votes	%	±%
Liberal	Paddy Torsney	22,042	44.1	0.0
Progressive Conservative	Mike Kuegle	16,344	32.7	+6.5
Reform	Terry Lamping	8,662	17.3	-5.9
New Democratic	Jim Hough	2,561	5.1	+2.1
Canadian Action	Ann Marsden	352	0.7	
Total valid votes		49,961	100.0	

1993 Canadian federal election: Burlington
Party	Candidate	Votes	%	±%
Liberal	Paddy Torsney	22,785	44.1	+17.5
Progressive Conservative	Mike Kuegle	13,540	26.2	-25.9
Reform	Hugh Ramolla	11,984	23.2	
New Democratic	Jim Hough	1,554	3.0	-13.1
Independent	Bill Barlett	929	1.8	
National	Bill Watson	535	1.0	
Natural Law	Ursula Kropfel	336	0.7	
Total valid votes		51,663	100.0	

Preceded by Bill Kempling	Member of Parliament for Burlington; 1993-2006	Succeeded by Mike Wallace
