= Okanagan—Similkameen—Merritt =

Former federal electoral district in British Columbia, Canada

Coordinates: 49.662°N 120.426°W

British Columbia electoral district

Defunct federal electoral district
- Legislature: House of Commons
- District created: 1987
- District abolished: 1996
- First contested: 1988
- Last contested: 1993

Okanagan—Similkameen—Merritt was a federal electoral district in British Columbia, Canada, that was represented in the House of Commons of Canada from 1988 to 1997. This riding was created in 1987 from Okanagan—Similkameen, and eliminated in 1996 when it was divided between Okanagan—Coquihalla and West Kootenay—Okanagan.

The riding consisted of the west part of the Kootenay Boundary Regional District, the Okanagan-Similkameen Regional District, Electoral Areas M and N of the Thompson-Nicola Regional District, and the city of Merritt.

== Members of Parliament ==
Parliament	Years	Member	Party
Riding created from Okanagan—Similkameen
34th	1988–1993	Jack Whittaker	New Democratic
35th	1993–1997	Jim Hart	Reform
Riding dissolved into Okanagan—Coquihalla and West Kootenay—Okanagan

== Election results ==
1993 Canadian federal election
Party	Candidate	Votes	%	±%
Reform	Jim Hart	21,172	43.63	+37.86
Liberal	Mike Reed	11,888	24.50	+7.09
New Democratic	Jack Whittaker	7,174	14.79	−23.86
Progressive Conservative	Sue Irvine	6,150	12.67	−22.87
National	Ken Noble	1,185	2.44	–
Green	Harry Naegel	473	0.97	−0.62
Natural Law	Steven R. Beck	264	0.54	–
Canada Party	Leslie G. Sykes	216	0.45	–
Total valid votes		48,522	100.00	
Reform gain from New Democratic		Swing		+15.38

1988 Canadian federal election
Party	Candidate	Votes	%
New Democratic	Jack Whittaker	16,694	38.65
Progressive Conservative	Fred King	15,352	35.54
Liberal	Joanne Grimaldi	7,520	17.41
Reform	Ron Amos	2,492	5.77
Green	John Hughes	686	1.59
Social Credit	Colin Abbey	451	1.04
Total valid votes		43,195	100.00
This riding was created from parts of Okanagan—Similkameen, where Progressive Conservative Frederick King was the incumbent.

== See also ==
- List of Canadian electoral districts
- Historical federal electoral districts of Canada
