= Kim Schreiner =

Canadian politician

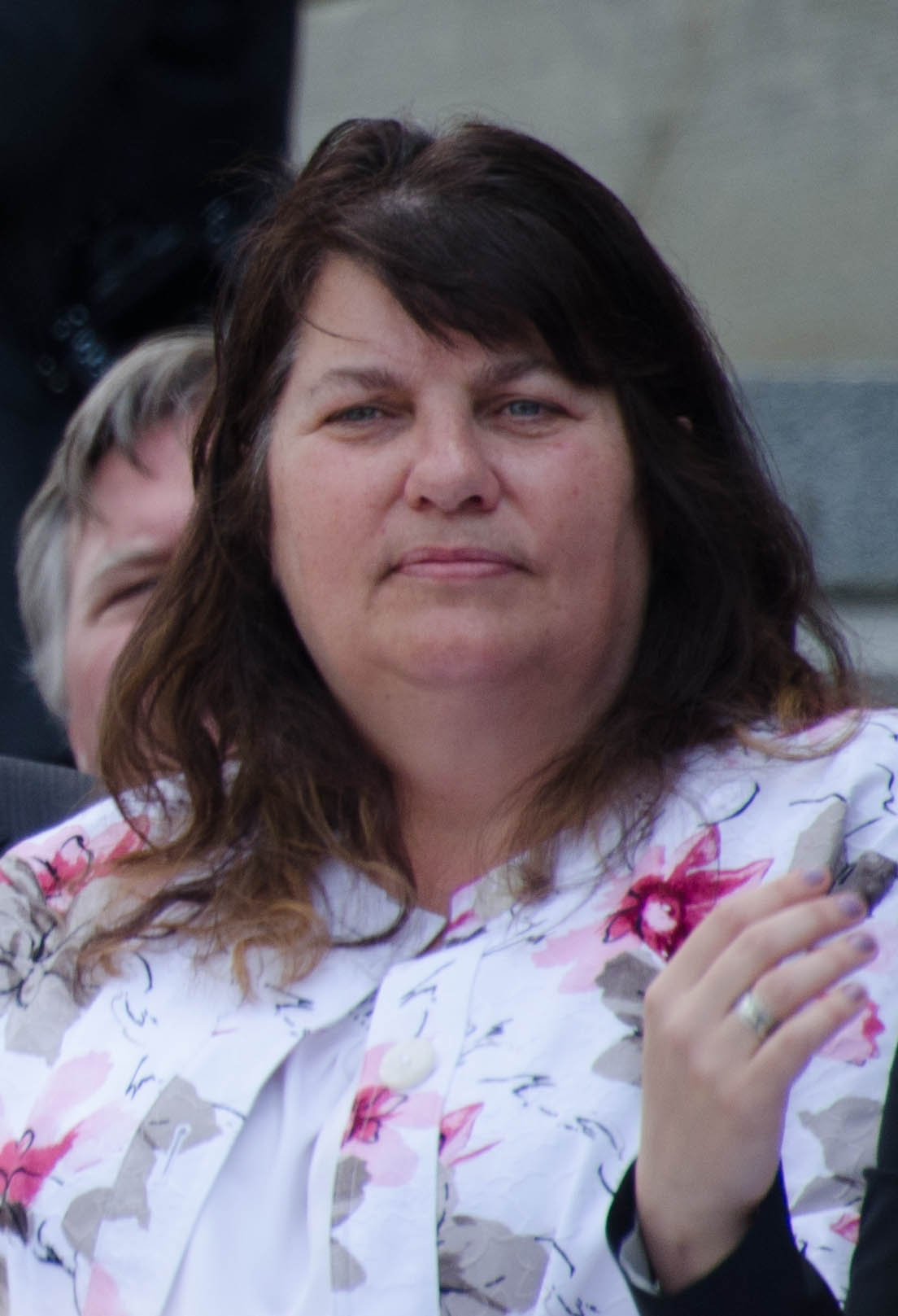
- Schreiner in May 2015

Member of the Legislative Assembly of Alberta for Red Deer-North
- In office May 5, 2015 – April 16, 2019
- Preceded by: Mary Anne Jablonski
- Succeeded by: Adriana LaGrange

Personal details
- Born: 1963 or 1964 (age 61–62) Abitibi, Quebec
- Party: Alberta New Democratic Party
- Occupation: Health-Care provider

Kim Schreiner (born 1961 or 1962) is a Canadian politician who was elected in the 2015 Alberta general election to the Legislative Assembly of Alberta representing the electoral district of Red Deer-North. She is a member of the New Democratic Party.

Schreiner has held a number of Committee positions, including deputy chair of the Standing Committee on the Alberta Heritage Savings Trust Fund and member of the Special Standing Committee on Members’ Services and the Standing Committee on Alberta's Economic Future.

== Electoral history ==
=== 2019 general election ===
2019 Alberta general election: Red Deer-North
Party	Candidate	Votes	%	±%
United Conservative	Adriana LaGrange	12,739	60.61%	13.28%
New Democratic	Kim Schreiner	4,873	23.18%	-6.18%
Alberta Party	Paul Hardy	2,769	13.17%	9.14%
Freedom Conservative	Matt Chapin	389	1.85%	–
Alberta Independence	Michael Neufeld	248	1.18%	–
Total		21,018	–	–
Rejected, spoiled and declined		149	–	–
Eligible electors / turnout		31,975	66.20%	17.56%
United Conservative gain from New Democratic		Swing		16.36%
Source(s) Source: "78 - Red Deer-North, 2019 Alberta general election". officialresults.elections.ab.ca. Elections Alberta.

=== 2015 general election ===
2015 Alberta general election: Red Deer-North
Party	Candidate	Votes	%	±%
New Democratic	Kim Schreiner	4,969	29.36%	22.02%
Wildrose	S.H. (Buck) Buchanan	4,173	24.66%	-9.81%
Progressive Conservative	Christine Moore	3,836	22.67%	-16.05%
Liberal	Michael Dawe	3,262	19.28%	1.68%
Alberta Party	Krystal Kromm	683	4.04%	2.16%
Total		16,923	–	–
Rejected, spoiled and declined		102	–	–
Eligible electors / turnout		35,001	48.64%	3.33%
New Democratic gain from Progressive Conservative		Swing		0.23%
Source(s) Source: "75 - Red Deer-North, 2015 Alberta general election". officialresults.elections.ab.ca. Elections Alberta.
