= Frederick King (politician) =

Canadian Member of Parliament

Member of the Canadian Parliament for Okanagan—Similkameen
- In office 1979–1988
- Preceded by: District was created in 1976
- Succeeded by: District was abolished in 1987

Personal details
- Born: Frederick John King; 11 June 1923 Kaleden, British Columbia
- Died: 30 August 2016 (aged 93) Penticton, British Columbia
- Party: Progressive Conservative
- Spouse: Audrey Margaret Browne (m. 1948)
- Committees: Chair, Legislative Committee E on Bill C-61 (1986–1988)

Frederick John King (11 June 1923 – 30 August 2016) was a Canadian politician. He was a Progressive Conservative Party member of the House of Commons of Canada. He was a farmer, orchardist, and public servant by career.

King was born in Kaleden, British Columbia , where he attended public school, then graduated to secondary school in Penticton. He was first elected to national politics in the Okanagan—Similkameen electoral district in the 1979 federal election. He was re-elected there in the 1980 and 1984 federal elections. In the 1988 federal election, when the riding became Okanagan—Similkameen—Merritt, King lost to Jack Whittaker of the New Democratic Party and did not campaign in any further federal elections. He died on 30 August 2016 in Penticton, British Columbia.
