= Red Deer-North =

Provincial electoral district in Alberta, Canada

Coordinates: 52.293°N 113.817°W

Alberta electoral district
- Red Deer-North within the City of Red Deer, 2017 boundaries

Provincial electoral district
- Legislature: Legislative Assembly of Alberta
MLA
Adriana LaGrange
United Conservative
- District created: 1986
- First contested: 1986
- Last contested: 2023

Red Deer North is a provincial electoral district in Alberta, Canada. The district is mandated to return a single member to the Legislative Assembly of Alberta using the first past the post method of voting. The district was created in the 1986 boundary redistribution. It was an all-urban district, until the 2004 boundary re-distribution. The constituency was expanded to include a small area outside the city limits, including the nearby town of Blackfalds. The constituency now only fits within the city limits of Red Deer.

The district has historically tilted toward the right, like Red Deer as a whole. It had been a Progressive Conservative stronghold since it was created, however in the 2015 provincial election, the seat was won by NDP candidate Kim Schreiner. The riding returned to its conservative ways in 2019, when Adriana LaGrange won it for the United Conservative Party.

== History ==
The electoral district was created in the 1985 boundary redistribution from the Red Deer provincial electoral district. The city of Red Deer had been contained in a single electoral district since 1888 when it first started returning members to the Legislative Assembly of the Northwest Territories. The city was split into North and Red Deer-South.

By 1996, Red Deer-North had a population of 29,115.

The 2010 boundary redistribution saw adjustments made to Red Deer-North to give portions of the constituency that were outside of the city of Red Deer to Innisfail-Sylvan Lake to match the city boundary. The border with Red Deer-South was also adjusted to equalize the population between the two constituencies.

=== Boundary history ===
71 Red Deer-North 2003 boundaries
Bordering districts
North	East	West	South
Lacombe-Ponoka	Lacombe-Ponoka	Innisfail-Sylvan Lake, Lacombe-Ponoka,	Innisfail-Sylvan Lake, Red Deer-South
riding map goes here		map in relation to other districts in Alberta goes here	
Legal description from the Statutes of Alberta 2003, Electoral Divisions Act.
Starting at the intersection of the east boundary of Rge. 28 W4 and the right bank of the Blindman River; then 1. downstream along the right bank of the Blindman River to its intersection with the right bank of the Red Deer River; 2. southeasterly along the right bank of the Red Deer River to the intersection with Highway 11; 3. west along Highway 11 to the east boundary of the City of Red Deer (Range Road 271); 4. south along Range Road 271 to its intersection with an extension of Ross Street (50 Street); 5. west along the extension and Ross Street to Taylor Drive; 6. northwest along Taylor Drive to the right bank of the Red Deer River; 7. upstream along the right bank to its intersection with the west Red Deer city boundary; 8. southwest and north along the City of Red Deer boundary to the north boundary of Twp. 38 (Highway 11A); 9. west along the north boundary of Twp. 38 (Highway 11A) to the east boundary of Rge. 28 W4; 10. north along the east boundary of Rge. 28 W4 to the starting point.
Note:

75 Red Deer-North 2010 boundaries
Bordering districts
North	East	West	South
Innisfail-Sylvan Lake	Innisfail-Sylvan Lake	Innisfail-Sylvan Lake	Red Deer-South
Note: Boundary descriptions were not used in the 2010 redistribution

=== Representation history ===
Members of the Legislative Assembly for Red Deer-North
Assembly	Years	Member	Party
See Red Deer 1905–1986
21st	1986–1989	Stockwell Day	Progressive; Conservative
22nd	1989–1993	Stockwell Day	Progressive; Conservative
23rd	1993–1997	Stockwell Day	Progressive; Conservative
24th	1997–2000	Stockwell Day	Progressive; Conservative
24th	2000	Vacant	
24th	2000–2001	Mary Anne Jablonski	Progressive; Conservative
25th	2001–2004	Mary Anne Jablonski	Progressive; Conservative
26th	2004–2008	Mary Anne Jablonski	Progressive; Conservative
27th	2008–2012	Mary Anne Jablonski	Progressive; Conservative
27th	2012–2015	Mary Anne Jablonski	Progressive; Conservative
29th	2015–2019	Kim Schreiner	New Democratic
30th	2019–2023	Adriana LaGrange	United Conservative
31st	2023–present	Adriana LaGrange	United Conservative

The electoral district was created in the 1986 boundary redistribution. The first election held that year saw Progressive Conservative candidate Stockwell Day win a tight race to pick up the new seat for his party. He was re-elected by a larger margin in the 1989 election.

Premier Ralph Klein appointed Day to the cabinet in 1992 as the Minister of Labour. He was re-elected less than a year later in the 1993 election with a landslide majority. In 1996 he was appointed as Minister of Family and Social Services. He won another term with a reduced majority in 1997. After that election Klein appointed him Provincial Treasurer. Day resigned on July 11, 2000, after being elected as federal leader of the Canadian Alliance.

A by-election was held on September 25, 2000. Day was replaced in the legislature by Progressive Conservative candidate Mary Anne Jablonski who won the hotly contested by-election. She won her second term less than a year later in the 2001 general election. She was re-elected again in 2004 and 2008. In 2008 Premier Ed Stelmach appointed Jablonski to the cabinet as Minister of Seniors and Community Supports.

Jablonski held the seat without serious difficulty until her retirement in 2015. That year, massive vote splitting resulted in Kim Schreiner taking the riding for the NDP, winning with just over 29 percent of the vote in a three-way race with the Tories and Wildrose. The riding reverted to form in 2019, with Adriana LaGrange of the newly merged United Conservative Party overwhelming Schreiner by a nearly 3-to-1 margin.

== Legislative election results ==
=== 1986 ===
1986 Alberta general election
Party	Candidate	Votes	%	±%
Progressive Conservative	Stockwell Day	2,808	41.55%	–
Liberal	Donald Campbell	2,372	35.10%	–
New Democratic	Bruce Beck	1,279	18.93%	–
Representative	Elvin Janzen	153	2.26%	–
Independent	Brian Flewwelling	146	2.16%	–
Total		6,758	–	–
Rejected, spoiled and declined		11	–	–
Eligible electors / turnout		17,949	37.71%	–
Progressive Conservative pickup new district.				
Source(s) Source: "Red Deer-North Official Results 1986 Alberta general election". Alberta Heritage Community Foundation.

=== 1989 ===
1989 Alberta general election
Party	Candidate	Votes	%	±%
Progressive Conservative	Stockwell Day	3,652	48.24%	6.69%
Liberal	Bernie Fritze	2,260	29.85%	-5.24%
New Democratic	Gerry Clayton	1,427	18.85%	-0.07%
Independent	Cory Lanterman	231	3.05%	–
Total		7,570	–	–
Rejected, spoiled and declined		22	–	–
Eligible electors / turnout		17,916	42.38%	4.66%
Progressive Conservative hold		Swing		5.97%
Source(s) Source: "Red Deer-North Official Results 1989 Alberta general election". Alberta Heritage Community Foundation.

=== 1993 ===
1993 Alberta general election
Party	Candidate	Votes	%	±%
Progressive Conservative	Stockwell Day	5,402	55.60%	7.36%
Liberal	Tony Connelly	2,888	29.73%	-0.13%
New Democratic	Linda Kaiser-Putzenberger	762	7.84%	-11.01%
Social Credit	Michael Roth	559	5.75%	–
Natural Law	Katherine Fisher	104	1.07%	–
Total		9,715	–	–
Rejected, spoiled and declined		28	–	–
Eligible electors / turnout		18,937	51.45%	9.07%
Progressive Conservative hold		Swing		3.74%
Source(s) Source: "Red Deer-North Official Results 1993 Alberta general election". Alberta Heritage Community Foundation.

=== 1997 ===
1997 Alberta general election
Party	Candidate	Votes	%	±%
Progressive Conservative	Stockwell Day	4,683	55.45%	-0.15%
Liberal	Norm McDougall	2,547	30.16%	0.43%
Social Credit	E. Patricia "Patti" Argent	655	7.76%	2.00%
New Democratic	Linda Kaiser	560	6.63%	-1.21%
Total		8,445	–	–
Rejected, spoiled and declined		13	–	–
Eligible electors / turnout		19,020	44.47%	-6.98%
Progressive Conservative hold		Swing		-0.29%
Source(s) Source: "Red Deer-North Official Results 1997 Alberta general election". Alberta Heritage Community Foundation.

=== 2000 by-election ===
Alberta provincial by-election, September 25, 2000
Party	Candidate	Votes	%	±%
Progressive Conservative	Mary Anne Jablonski	2,026	48.82	−6.63
Liberal	Norm McDougall	1,634	39.37	9.21
Alberta First	Patti Argent	338	8.15	0.39
New Democratic	Linda Roth	152	3.66	−2.97
Total		4,150		
Rejected, spoiled and declined		7		
Eligible electors / turnout		20,409	20.37	
Progressive Conservative hold		Swing		−7.92
Source(s) Alberta. Chief Electoral Officer (2000). The Report of the Chief Electoral Officer on the Edmonton-Highlands By-election held June 12, 2000 and the Red Deer-North By-election held September 25, 2000 (PDF) (Report). Edmonton: Legislative Assembly of Alberta; Chief Electoral Officer.

=== 2001 ===
2001 Alberta general election
Party	Candidate	Votes	%	±%
Progressive Conservative	Mary Anne Jablonski	5,025	57.10%	8.28%
Liberal	Norm McDougall	3,110	35.34%	−4.03%
Alberta First	E. Patricia "Patti" Argent	356	4.05%	−4.10%
New Democratic	Jim Guthrie	309	3.51%	−0.15%
Total		8,800	–	–
Rejected, spoiled and declined		20	–	–
Eligible electors / turnout		21,651	40.73%	20.36%
Progressive Conservative hold		Swing		6.16%
Source(s) Source: "Red Deer-North Official Results 2001 Alberta general election" (PDF). Elections Alberta.

=== 2004 ===
2004 Alberta general election
Party	Candidate	Votes	%	±%
Progressive Conservative	Mary Anne Jablonski	3,733	42.84%	-14.26%
Liberal	Norm McDougall	2,647	30.38%	-4.96%
Alberta Alliance	Rand Sisson	1,657	19.02%	–
New Democratic	Steven Bedford	432	4.96%	1.45%
Green	Colin Fisher	244	2.80%	–
Total		8,713	–	–
Rejected, spoiled and declined		85	–	–
Eligible electors / turnout		22,419	39.24%	-1.45%
Progressive Conservative hold		Swing		-4.65%
Source(s) Source: "Red Deer-North Statement of Official Results 2004 Alberta general election" (PDF). Elections Alberta.

=== 2008 ===
2008 Alberta general election
Party	Candidate	Votes	%	±%
Progressive Conservative	Mary Anne Jablonski	4,715	57.94%	15.09%
Liberal	Richard Farrand	1,770	21.75%	-8.63%
Wildrose	Urs Lehner	630	7.74%	-11.28%
New Democratic	Shawn Nielsen	560	6.88%	1.92%
Green	Rueben Tschetter	463	5.69%	2.89%
Total		8,138	–	–
Rejected, spoiled and declined		95	–	–
Eligible electors / turnout		27,661	29.76%	-9.48%
Progressive Conservative hold		Swing		11.86%
Source(s) Source: "71 - Red Deer-North, 2008 Alberta general election". officialresults.elections.ab.ca. Elections Alberta. The Report on the March 3, 2008 Provincial General Election of the Twenty-seventh Legislative Assembly. Elections Alberta. July 28, 2008. pp. 508–511.

=== 2012 ===
2012 Alberta general election
Party	Candidate	Votes	%	±%
Progressive Conservative	Mary Anne Jablonski	5,130	38.71%	-19.22%
Wildrose	Randy Weins	4,567	34.47%	26.72%
Liberal	Michael Dawe	2,332	17.60%	-4.15%
New Democratic	Derrek Seelinger	973	7.34%	0.46%
Alberta Party	Brent Chalmers	249	1.88%	–
Total		13,251	–	–
Rejected, spoiled, and declined		76	–	–
Eligible electors / turnout		29,414	45.31%	15.55%
Progressive Conservative hold		Swing		-15.97%
Source(s) Source: "75 - Red Deer-North, 2012 Alberta general election". officialresults.elections.ab.ca. Elections Alberta.

=== 2015 ===
2015 Alberta general election
Party	Candidate	Votes	%	±%
New Democratic	Kim Schreiner	4,969	29.36%	22.02%
Wildrose	S.H. (Buck) Buchanan	4,173	24.66%	-9.81%
Progressive Conservative	Christine Moore	3,836	22.67%	-16.05%
Liberal	Michael Dawe	3,262	19.28%	1.68%
Alberta Party	Krystal Kromm	683	4.04%	2.16%
Total		16,923	–	–
Rejected, spoiled and declined		102	–	–
Eligible electors / turnout		35,001	48.64%	3.33%
New Democratic gain from Progressive Conservative		Swing		0.23%
Source(s) Source: "75 - Red Deer-North, 2015 Alberta general election". officialresults.elections.ab.ca. Elections Alberta.

=== 2019 ===
2019 Alberta general election
Party	Candidate	Votes	%	±%
United Conservative	Adriana LaGrange	12,739	60.61%	13.28%
New Democratic	Kim Schreiner	4,873	23.18%	-6.18%
Alberta Party	Paul Hardy	2,769	13.17%	9.14%
Freedom Conservative	Matt Chapin	389	1.85%	–
Alberta Independence	Michael Neufeld	248	1.18%	–
Total		21,018	–	–
Rejected, spoiled and declined		149	–	–
Eligible electors / turnout		31,975	66.20%	17.56%
United Conservative gain from New Democratic		Swing		16.36%
Source(s) Source: "78 - Red Deer-North, 2019 Alberta general election". officialresults.elections.ab.ca. Elections Alberta.

=== 2023 ===
2023 Alberta general election
Party	Candidate	Votes	%	±%
United Conservative	Adriana LaGrange	10,629	57.47	-3.14
New Democratic	Jaelene Tweedle	7,144	38.63	+15.44
Alberta Independence	Vicky Bayford	281	1.52	+0.34
Green	Heather Morigeau	257	1.39	–
Solidarity Movement	Kallie Dyck	183	0.98	–
Total		18,494	99.30	–
Rejected and declined		130	0.70	
Turnout		18,624	55.48	
Eligible voters		33,568		
United Conservative hold		Swing		-9.29
Source(s) Source: Elections Alberta

== Senate nominee election results ==
=== 2004 ===
2004 Senate nominee election results: Red Deer-North				Turnout 39.16%	
Affiliation	Candidate	Votes	% votes	% ballots	Rank
Alberta Alliance	Michael Roth	2,775	12.96%	40.01%	7
Progressive Conservative	Betty Unger	2,760	12.90%	39.80%	2
Progressive Conservative	Bert Brown	2,520	11.78%	36.34%	1
Independent	Link Byfield	2,238	10.46%	32.27%	4
Alberta Alliance	Vance Gough	2,129	9.95%	30.70%	8
Alberta Alliance	Gary Horan	2,048	9.57%	29.53%	10
Progressive Conservative	Cliff Breitkreuz	1,986	9.28%	28.64%	3
Progressive Conservative	Jim Silye	1,727	8.07%	24.90%	5
Progressive Conservative	David Usherwood	1,720	8.03%	24.80%	6
Independent	Tom Sindlinger	1,498	7.00%	21.60%	9
Total votes		21,401	100%		
Total ballots		6,935	3.09 votes per ballot		
Rejected, spoiled and declined		1,844			

Voters had the option of selecting four candidates on the ballot

=== 2012 ===
2012 Senate nominee election results: Red Deer-South				Turnout %	
Affiliation	Candidate	Votes	% votes	% ballots	Rank
Progressive Conservative	Doug Black	0	0%	0%	0
Independent	Len Bracko	0	0%	0%	0
Independent	Perry Chahal	0	0%	0%	0
Independent	William Exelby	0	0%	0%	0
Independent	David Fletcher	0	0%	0%	0
Independent	Paul Frank	0	0%	0%	0
Wildrose	Raymond Germain				
Wildrose		Rob Gregory			
Evergreen	Elizabeth Johannson	0	0%	0%	0
Wildrose		Victor Marciano			
Progressive Conservative	Mike Shaikh	0	0%	0%	0
Progressive Conservative	Scott Tannas	0	0%	0%	0
Independent	Ian Urquhart	0	0%	0%	0
Total votes		0	100%		
Total ballots		0	0 votes per ballot		
Rejected, spoiled and declined		0			

Voters had the option of selecting four candidates on the ballot

== Student vote results ==
=== 2004 ===
Participating schools
Central Middle School
Eastview Middle School
Glendale Middle School
Lindsay Thurber Comprehensive High School

On November 19, 2004, a student vote was conducted at participating Alberta schools to parallel the 2004 Alberta general election results. The vote was designed to educate students and simulate the electoral process for persons who have not yet reached the legal majority. The vote was conducted in 80 of the 83 provincial electoral districts with students voting for actual election candidates. Schools with a large student body that reside in another electoral district had the option to vote for candidates outside of the electoral district then where they were physically located.

2004 Alberta student vote results
Affiliation	Candidate	Votes	%
Progressive Conservative	Mary Anne Jablonski	430	32.07%
Liberal	Norm McDougall	363	27.07%
Green	Colin Fisher	250	18.64%
Alberta Alliance	Rand Sisson	154	11.48%
NDP	Steven Bedford	144	10.74%
Total		1,341	100%
Rejected, spoiled and declined		28	

=== 2012 ===
Participating schools
École Camille J. Lerouge School

2012 Alberta student vote results
Affiliation	Candidate	Votes	%
Progressive Conservative	Mary Anne Jablonski		%
Wildrose	Randy Weins		
Liberal	Michael Dawe		%
NDP	Derrek Seelinger		%
Alberta Party	Brent Chalmers		%
Total			100%

== See also ==
- List of Alberta provincial electoral districts
- Canadian provincial electoral districts
