= Jim Hart (British Columbia politician) =

Canadian politician

James Alexander Hart (born October 30, 1955) is a Canadian politician.

== Early years ==
Hart was born in Edmonton, Alberta, was educated in Calgary, and completed his military training at Canadian Forces Fleet School Halifax, CFB Borden and CFB Esquimalt. He served in the Canadian Armed Forces twice, first for 5 years in the Royal Canadian Navy. After training as an electrical technician, Hart served on 3 RCN Ships: HMCS Gatineau, Qu'Appelle and Yukon. Hart served an additional 5 years as a Canadian Armed Forces Reserve officer and Commanding Officer of the 902 Kiwanis Air Cadet Squadron. Hart completed his broadcasting training at the Columbia Academy of Radio and Television Arts in Vancouver, British Columbia in 1981. He was manager of radio station CKSP in Summerland from 1981 to 1988 and Account Executive for Shaw Cable in Penticton from 1988 to 1993. Hart has also studied at the Canadian Securities Institute, completing the Canadian Securities Course and the Ethics, Conduct and Practices Program. Prior to entering political life, Hart worked in the broadcasting industry as radio host, television host, account executive and radio station manager.

== Political career ==
In 1988, Hart was elected to municipal government and served two terms as a Trustee. In 1989, he joined a new national political movement, the Reform Party of Canada, which became the Canadian Alliance in 2000.

Hart was first elected 1993 to represent the riding of Okanagan—Similkameen—Merritt, British Columbia, in the House of Commons. He was re-elected in 1997 in the new riding of Okanagan—Coquihalla.

In 1998, as a member of Canada's official opposition, he was elected by his peers as the Vice Chairman of the House Standing Committee of Defense and Veterans’ Affairs. As well, Hart was appointed as Chief Opposition Critic for a number of senior portfolios including Defense, Veterans’ Affairs, and Justice. He also served as an executive member on the Canada/Japan and NATO Parliamentary Associations. After publicly attacking Reform Party leader Preston Manning and accepting the Parliamentary Pension Plan, Hart briefly quit the Reform caucus before publicly apologizing to be accepted back into the caucus.

In March 1996 Hart accused Jean-Marc Jacob, Member of Parliament for Charlesbourg, of sedition for a 1995 communique sent by Jacob to members of the Armed Forces in Quebec concerning the October 30, 1995 separation referendum in that province. Jacob's communique urged Canadian Armed Forces personnel, along with equipment and military hardware, to immediately join the new Quebec Armed Forces if the referendum passed. (The referendum failed to win a majority.) The House of Commons referred the matter to a committee for study. On June 18, 1996, the Standing Committee on Procedure and House Affairs presented its Twenty-Ninth Report which found that although Jacob's actions were ill-advised, there was no contempt of the House.

== Inquiry ==
Hart resigned as a Member of Parliament in order so that newly elected Canadian Alliance leader Stockwell Day could enter the House of Commons through a by-election. After the by-election, Hart received a severance payment of $50,000 from the Canadian Alliance, which prompted a Royal Canadian Mounted Police (RCMP) inquiry. The Canadian Alliance maintained that the payment was made to cover lost income between the time of his resignation and the date of the next election, and was not an inducement.

The RCMP inquiry concluded that an investigation was not necessary and that neither Hart nor the Canadian Alliance had committed a criminal offence, and no charges were ever laid in the matter.

== Later career ==
Since leaving Parliament, Hart started a Public and Government Relations business, with clients including the British Columbia Naturopathic Association, and continued to speak publicly about proposed changes to health care regulations in British Columbia.

In 2004 Hart moved to Georgia and worked as a parliamentary adviser to Speaker Nino Burjanadze.

In 2005, Hart received an honorary doctorate from Georgian Technical University for his work in Parliament and promoting democracy in Georgia.

In May 2008, Hart returned to Georgia and accepted a position as Dean of the School of Governance at Caucasus University.

In the fall of 2008, Jim Hart was offered a position with Management Systems International (MSI) to work in Baghdad, Iraq as Senior Legislative Adviser on a multi-year contract to assist in strengthening the Council of Representatives of Iraq's national parliament. Hart accepted the position and in June 2009 he was promoted to the position of Chief of Party, heading the field operations and programming of the Iraq Legislative Strengthening Program (ILSP) a multimillion-dollar United States Agency for International Development (USAID) development program.

Since 2004, Jim Hart has been working on parliamentary development, managing parliamentary strengthening programs in Georgia, Iraq, and Indonesia. He also helped with observing elections in Ukraine, Georgia, and Afghanistan, with clients including international NGOs, USAID, the Organization for Security and Co-operation in Europe (OSCE) and the European Union (EU).

From July 2, 2013, to July 1, 2018, he served as a full-time member of the Pacific Regional Division of the Parole Board of Canada.

== Publications ==
- Hart, Jim. Straight from Hart. ISBN 1-896967-50-7
