= Karina Gould =

Canadian politician (born 1987)

The Honourable Karina Gould PC MP
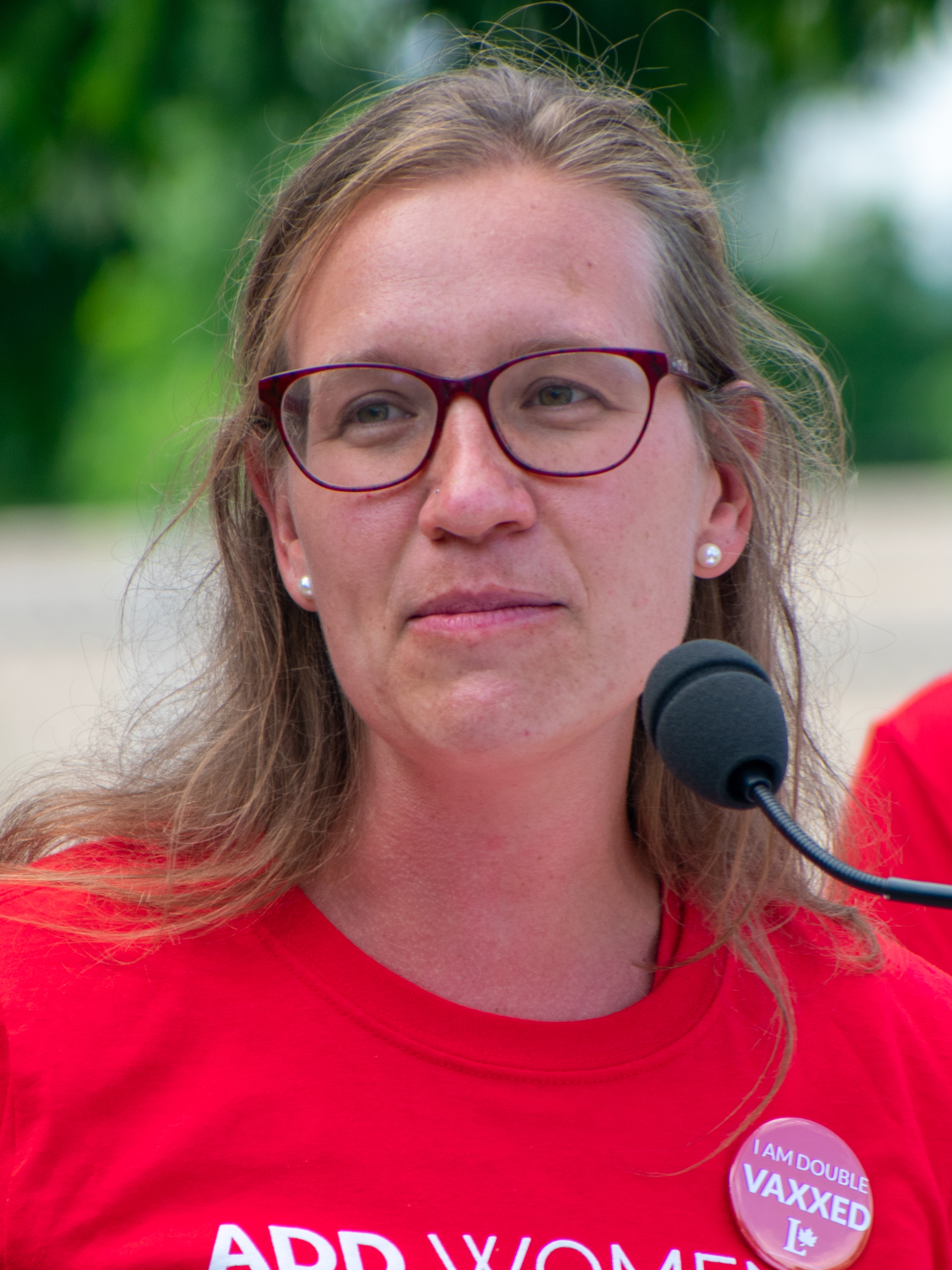
- Gould in 2021

Chair of the Standing Committee on Finance
- Incumbent
- Assumed office June 16, 2025
- Preceded by: Peter Fonseca

Leader of the Government in the House of Commons
- In office July 26, 2023 – January 24, 2025
- Prime Minister: Justin Trudeau
- Preceded by: Mark Holland
- Succeeded by: Steven MacKinnon

Minister of Families, Children and Social Development
- In office October 26, 2021 – July 26, 2023
- Prime Minister: Justin Trudeau
- Preceded by: Ahmed Hussen
- Succeeded by: Jenna Sudds

Minister of International Development
- In office November 20, 2019 – October 26, 2021
- Prime Minister: Justin Trudeau
- Preceded by: Maryam Monsef
- Succeeded by: Harjit Sajjan

Minister of Democratic Institutions
- In office February 1, 2017 – November 20, 2019
- Prime Minister: Justin Trudeau
- Preceded by: Maryam Monsef
- Succeeded by: Dominic LeBlanc (2023)

President of the Queen's Privy Council for Canada
- In office January 10, 2017 – July 18, 2018
- Prime Minister: Justin Trudeau
- Preceded by: Maryam Monsef
- Succeeded by: Dominic LeBlanc

Parliamentary Secretary to the Minister of International Development
- In office December 2, 2015 – January 10, 2017
- Minister: Marie-Claude Bibeau
- Preceded by: Lois Brown
- Succeeded by: Celina Caesar-Chavannes

Member of Parliament for Burlington
- Incumbent
- Assumed office October 19, 2015
- Preceded by: Mike Wallace

Personal details
- Born: June 28, 1987 (age 39) Burlington, Ontario, Canada
- Party: Liberal
- Spouse: Alberto Gerones (m. 2010)
- Children: 2
- Education: McGill University (BA); St Hilda's College, Oxford (MPhil)
- Website: kgould.liberal.ca

Karina Maxine Gould (born June 28, 1987) is a Canadian politician and member of the Liberal Party. She has served as member of Parliament (MP) for the riding of Burlington in the House of Commons since October 19, 2015. Gould was first appointed to Cabinet on February 1, 2017, as minister of Democratic Institutions, serving in the role until she was appointed minister of International Development on November 20, 2019, and has since then served in two other portfolios. Gould is the youngest woman to serve as a Cabinet minister in Canadian history and the first woman to have a child while serving as a federal minister. Gould went on maternity leave in January 2024 and was temporarily replaced as House Leader by Steven MacKinnon; she returned to the position in July 2024.

On January 18, 2025, Gould announced her campaign for the Liberal leadership. She was the youngest candidate, and was the only candidate still serving as a cabinet minister before resigning on January 24, 2025. She placed in third in the election.

== Early life and career ==
Gould was born on June 28, 1987, and grew up in Burlington, Ontario, the daughter of Gesa (Kohn), who practiced veterinary medicine, and Peter Gould. She has three brothers. Her paternal grandparents were Czech Jews who survived the Holocaust. Her mother was German and met her father while on a kibbutz in Israel. At sixteen, she participated in the Forum for Young Canadians, spending a week in Ottawa learning about the federal government, which she credits as the impetus for her goal of a career in Parliament. After she graduated from M.M. Robinson High School in 2005, she spent the next year volunteering at an orphanage in Mexico, where she met her husband, Alberto Gerones.

Upon her return to Canada in 2006, Gould attended McGill University, earning a joint honours degree in political science as well as Latin American and Caribbean studies. Writing her honours thesis on the Canadian electoral system, she graduated first class honours with distinction in 2010. During her time as an undergraduate student she served as the president of the Arts Undergraduate Society (AUS) and helped organize fundraising for humanitarian aid for Haiti in the aftermath of the 2010 earthquake.

In 2010, Gould took a job with the Organization of American States in Washington, D.C., working as a consultant in the Migration and Development Program. She is cited as contributing to the 2011 report, International Migration in the Americas: First Report of the Continuous Reporting System on International Migration in the Americas (SICREMI).

Gould subsequently completed a master's degree in international relations at St Hilda's College, Oxford. Upon completion of her graduate studies at Oxford, Gould decided to move back to her hometown of Burlington, Ontario. She took a job working as a Trade and Investment Specialist for the Mexican Trade Commission "ProMexico" in Toronto. Gould held this position for less than a year before announcing her candidacy in the 2015 election at the age of twenty-eight.

== Political career ==
=== 2015 Canadian federal election ===
At the age of 28, Gould defeated Conservative incumbent Mike Wallace, who had represented the riding since the 2006 federal election, by winning 46% of the vote to his 42.5%.

During the election campaign, she attracted minor attention for deleting a three-year-old tweet expressing opposition to the Enbridge Northern Gateway Pipelines – eventually not approved by the Trudeau government – and to the development of the Alberta tar sands in general.

Reflecting upon her first campaign in 2019 interview, Gould said: "In 2015, I'd say the No. 1 thing people asked me at the door was how old I was and why I thought I could jump into politics at such a young age... And I know, for a fact, that they wouldn't ask a man of the same age those questions."

=== Parliamentary Secretary ===
Gould was named the parliamentary secretary to the minister of international development and La Francophonie on December 2, 2015. During her time in this role she chaired a foreign-aid strategy session at the Health Systems Research Conference in Vancouver (2016) where stated that it was important to empower women and girls within a feminist approach to foreign aid. During United States President Barack Obama's July 2016 state visit to Ottawa, he gave a shout out to Burlington during his address to Parliament (where his brother-in-law Konrad Ng lives), prompting Gould to wave for the cameras, in what Maclean's called her most high-profile moment.

=== Minister of Democratic Institutions ===
On January 10, 2017, she was named Minister of Democratic Institutions, succeeding Maryam Monsef. She also became the President of the Queen's Privy Council for Canada. These appointments made her the youngest female Cabinet minister in Canadian history, taking office at the age of twenty-nine.

Despite electoral reforms being a pledged mandate of Prime Minister Justin Trudeau's 2015 campaign, with this appointment such electoral reforms were no longer part of the Minister of Democratic Institutions mandate. Instead, Gould's mandate included commitments to strengthen Canada's democratic institutions and improve Canada's democratic process by addressing cyber threats, like online meddling and the spread of disinformation from social media giants, and combatting foreign interference. Gould has been credited as being instrumental in both passing and defending Bill C-76 or Elections Modernization Act, which made significant amendments to the Canadian Elections Act, including numerous accommodations for voter accessibility, restrictions on third-party interference on election campaigns, and a prohibition on spending by foreign entities during elections.

=== 2019 Canadian federal election ===
Running as the incumbent in the 2019 Canadian federal election, Gould was re-elected to her seat. Gould's hometown support grew as her 2019 results surpassed that of 2015, winning 48.6% of the vote to Conservative Jane Michael's 33.2%. With her party winning just 157 seats as opposed to the 177 held prior, Gould's growing support in this key southern Ontario riding enabled the Liberals to obtain a minority government in the 2019 Canadian federal election.

=== Minister for International Development ===
Gould became the Minister for International Development, a key position in Trudeau's foreign policy. It came to light on May 18, 2020, that Gould was formally in charge of the Canadian government's sponsorship of the World Health Organization (WHO). As minister she was entrusted the discussions with Tedros Adhanom Ghebreyesus, the WHO's director-general. She had a "good and frank conversation" with him via electronic means the week before the 73rd World Health Assembly.

As minister, Gould was responsible for implementing Canada's Feminist International Assistance Policy which targets gender equality and the empowerment of women and girls around the world. Gould assisted in leading Canada's global efforts in combatting the COVID-19 pandemic. As a champion for gender equality, she also worked to fight hunger, eradicate poverty and advance the sexual and reproductive health and rights of women. In 2021, Gould was appointed as co-chair of the COVAX Advance Market Commitment (AMC) Engagement Group to ensure safe and equitable access to vaccines for all 92 COVAX AMC-eligible economies.

=== Minister of Families, Children and Social Development ===
Gould was shuffled to the families, children and social development portfolio on October 26, 2021. As Minister, Gould was responsible for signing Early Learning and Child Care agreements with Alberta, New Brunswick, Nunavut, Northwest Territories, and Ontario. These agreements aim to reduce average child care costs to $10 per day by 2026. She was also responsible for working with Indigenous partners to ensure that Indigenous children have access to a culturally appropriate Indigenous Early Learning and Child Care system.

In May 2022, followings leaks of the American Supreme Court's draft opinion of Dobbs v. Jackson, Gould said American women could access abortions in Canada before Roe v. Wade was overturned. She also expressed concern for Canadian women who accessed abortion in the United States because of lack of access in Canada.

During the spring and summer of 2022, the government received criticism regarding long passport processing times, which fell under Gould's ministerial responsibilities. The federal government had shut down Services Canada Centres and Passport Offices in March 2020 because of the COVID-19 pandemic and limited applications to "valid urgent travel reasons". Service Canada had warned of high demand for passport applications to come following the loosening of pandemic restrictions, which the government had underestimated. Slow processing times led to lengthy delays, forcing many Canadians to cancel travel plans. In early 2023, under Gould's leadership, Service Canada had returned the passport program to a steady state, reducing processing times and virtually eliminating the backlog of passport requests.

=== Leader of the Government in the House of Commons ===
Prior to a cabinet shuffle, Gould revealed she was expecting her second child and would take parental leave. She was appointed Leader of the Government in the House of Commons in July 2023. Amid the Yaroslav Hunka scandal, Gould deleted a photo from social media of her encounter with Hunka, asked for the Speaker's resignation, and proposed the incident be stricken from official records. This motion was criticized and blocked by the opposition. In November 2023, Gould accused the Leader of the Official Opposition, Pierre Poilievre, of "American-style, right-wing politics" after he voted against a free-trade agreement with Ukraine because it included a provision that both sides would "promote carbon pricing".

=== 2025 leadership campaign ===
Gould announced her candidacy in the 2025 Liberal Party of Canada leadership election, to succeed Prime Minister Justin Trudeau. She resigned as Government House Leader to run in the race and was replaced on January 24, 2025, by Steven MacKinnon, who had stood in for her during her maternity leave in 2024.

Gould said she would introduce a universal basic income program if she won the leadership election and became Canada's next prime minister. Gould acknowledged her government mishandled the affordability crisis and had not responded well to the issues that mattered the most to Canadians. She stated she would keep consumer carbon pricing but would stop the April 2025 increase if elected, adding she got into politics to stop climate change.

Gould placed third in the election, behind both victor Mark Carney and runner-up Chrystia Freeland, with just over 3% of the vote.

When forming the new government, Carney left Gould out of cabinet, and immediately removed the consumer carbon tax.

=== 2025 Canadian federal election ===
Gould was re-elected to her seat for a fourth term in the 2025 Canadian federal election, winning over 55% of the vote in her Burlington riding.

She was elected chair of the Canadian House of Commons Standing Committee on Finance in the 45th Canadian Parliament in 2025.

== Personal life ==
Gould married her husband, Alberto Gerones, in 2010. She gave birth to her first child, a son, on March 8, 2018; this made her the first sitting federal Cabinet minister to give birth while in office and the first Cabinet minister to take maternity leave. Her breastfeeding her then-three-month-old son during question period in the House of Commons attracted media attention during June 2018. The family welcomed a second child, a daughter, on January 23, 2024.

== Electoral record ==
2025 Canadian federal election: Burlington
Party	Candidate	Votes	%	±%	Expenditures
Liberal	Karina Gould	43,593	55.8	+10.08	
Conservative	Emily Brown	31,686	40.6	+3.29	
New Democratic	Michael Beauchemin	1,549	2.0	–8.88	
Green	Kyle Hutton	595	0.8	–1.22	
People's	Michael Bator	523	0.7	–3.33	
Libertarian	Ocean Marshall	105	0.1	N/A	
Rhinoceros	Paul Harper	75	0.1	–0.08	
Total valid votes/expense limit		78,126	99.4	—	
Total rejected ballots		463	0.6	—	
Turnout		78,589	77.0	+7.3	
Eligible voters		102,123			
Liberal hold		Swing		+3.40	
Source: Elections Canada

2025 Liberal Party of Canada leadership election
Candidate	First ballot			
Candidate	Votes	%	Points	%
Mark Carney	131,674	86.84	29,456.91	85.88
Chrystia Freeland	11,134	7.34	2,728.57	7.96
Karina Gould	4,785	3.16	1,100.34	3.21
Frank Baylis	4,038	2.66	1,014.18	2.96
Total valid votes	151,899	100.00	34,300.00	100.00
Turnout	151,899	92.71		
Eligible voters	163,836			
Source: Liberal Party

2021 Canadian federal election: Burlington
Party	Candidate	Votes	%	±%	Expenditures
Liberal	Karina Gould	31,602	45.7	–2.9	$108,267.63
Conservative	Emily Brown	25,742	37.3	+4.1	$99,594.92
New Democratic	Nick Page	7,507	10.9	+0.7	$9,478.98
People's	Michael Bator	2,764	4.0	+2.7	$7,469.57
Green	Christian Cullis	1,368	2.0	–4.6	$1,096.10
Rhinoceros	Jevin David Carroll	122	0.2	N/A	$0.00
Total valid votes/Expense limit		69,105	99.4	–	$126,483.23
Total rejected ballots		424	0.6		
Turnout		69,529	69.7		
Eligible voters		99,734			
Liberal hold		Swing		–3.5	
Source: Elections Canada

2019 Canadian federal election: Burlington
Party	Candidate	Votes	%	±%	Expenditures
Liberal	Karina Gould	34,989	48.61	+2.63	$106,261.57
Conservative	Jane Michael	23,930	33.24	–9.24	$86,302.63
New Democratic	Lenaee Dupuis	7,372	10.24	+1.14	$31,070.76
Green	Gareth Williams	4,750	6.60	+4.16	$6,940.18
People's	Peter Smetana	944	1.31		$5,500.00
Total valid votes/expense limit		71,985	99.17		
Total rejected ballots		600	0.83	+0.45	
Turnout		72,585	72.44	–0.76	
Eligible voters		100,201			
Liberal hold		Swing		+5.93	
Source: Elections Canada

2015 Canadian federal election: Burlington
Party	Candidate	Votes	%	±%	Expenditures
Liberal	Karina Gould	32,229	45.98	+22.74	$104,313.08
Conservative	Mike Wallace	29,780	42.48	–11.66	$105,053.18
New Democratic	David Laird	6,381	9.10	–9.75	$28,503.64
Green	Vince Fiorito	1,710	2.44	–1.10	$1,631.97
Total valid votes/expense limit		70,100	99.63		$239,840.79
Total rejected ballots		263	0.37		
Turnout		70,363	73.20		
Eligible voters		96,126			
Liberal gain from Conservative		Swing		+17.20	
Source: Elections Canada

29th Canadian Ministry (2015–2025) – Cabinet of Justin Trudeau
Cabinet posts (3)
Predecessor	Office	Successor
Maryam Monsef	Minister of International Development; November 20, 2019 – October 26, 2021	Harjit Sajjan
Maryam Monsef	President of the Queen's Privy Council for Canada; January 10, 2017 – July 18, 2018	Dominic LeBlanc
Maryam Monsef	Minister of Democratic Institutions; February 1, 2017 – November 20, 2019	Dominic LeBlanc
