= Okanagan—Coquihalla =

Former federal electoral district in British Columbia, Canada

British Columbia electoral district
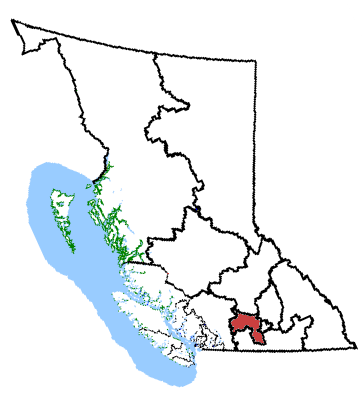
- Okanagan—Coquihalla in relation to other British Columbia federal electoral districts
- Coordinates: 50.522°N 119.488°W

Defunct federal electoral district
- Legislature: House of Commons
- District created: 1996
- District abolished: 2013
- First contested: 1997
- Last contested: 2011
- District webpage: profile, map

Demographics
- Population (2011): 113,836
- Electors (2011): 83,242
- Area (km²): 10,351.99
- Census subdivision(s): Penticton, Summerland, Merritt, Peachland, Logan Lake, West Kelowna, Central Okanagan J, Okanagan-Similkameen D, Okanagan-Similkameen E, Okanagan-Similkameen F, Tsinstikeptum 9

Okanagan—Coquihalla was a federal electoral district in the province of British Columbia, Canada, that had been represented in the House of Commons of Canada from 1997 to 2015.

== Geography ==
The electoral district included the towns of Penticton, Merritt, Summerland, Logan Lake, West Kelowna and Peachland.

== History ==
This riding was created in 1996 from parts of Fraser Valley East and Okanagan—Similkameen—Merritt ridings. In 2003, it underwent slight boundary changes, with small parts added from Kamloops, Thompson and Highland Valleys and Kelowna ridings.

=== Members of Parliament ===
This riding has elected the following members of Parliament:

Parliament	Years	Member	Party
Riding created from Fraser Valley East and Okanagan—Similkameen—Merritt
36th	1997–2000	Jim Hart	Reform
36th	2000–2000	Jim Hart	Alliance
36th	2000–2000	Stockwell Day	Alliance
37th	2000–2003	Stockwell Day	Alliance
37th	2003–2004	Stockwell Day	Conservative
38th	2004–2006	Stockwell Day	Conservative
39th	2006–2008	Stockwell Day	Conservative
40th	2008–2011	Stockwell Day	Conservative
41st	2011–2015	Dan Albas	Conservative
Riding dissolved into Central Okanagan—Similkameen—Nicola and South Okanagan—West Kootenay

== Election results ==
2011 Canadian federal election
Party	Candidate	Votes	%	±%	Expenditures
Conservative	Dan Albas	28,525	53.58	–4.55	$72,229.02
New Democratic	David Finnis	12,853	24.14	+7.50	$6,933.05
Liberal	John Kidder	5,815	10.92	–0.97	$58,313.83
Green	Dan Bouchard	5,005	9.40	–3.94	$8,848.42
Independent	Sean Upshaw	860	1.62	–	$1,935.62
Independent	Dietrich Wittel	180	0.34	–	none listed
Total valid votes/expense limit		53,238	99.77	–	$95,494.58
Total rejected ballots		121	0.23	–0.07	
Turnout		53,359	61.91	+2.28	
Eligible voters		86,195			
Conservative hold		Swing		–6.03	
Source: Elections Canada

2008 Canadian federal election
Party	Candidate	Votes	%	±%	Expenditures
Conservative	Stockwell Day	28,765	58.13	+7.89	$54,279.98
New Democratic	Ralph Poynting	8,236	16.64	–2.56	$8,171.58
Green	Dan Bouchard	6,603	13.34	+5.79	$497.79
Liberal	Valerie Hallford	5,883	11.89	–11.12	$14,688.88
Total valid votes/expense limit		49,487	99.70	–	$91,800.38
Total rejected ballots		148	0.30	+0.04	
Turnout		49,635	59.63	–3.20	
Eligible voters		83,242			
Conservative hold		Swing		+6.84	
Source: Elections Canada

2006 Canadian federal election
Party	Candidate	Votes	%	±%	Expenditures
Conservative	Stockwell Day	25,278	50.24	+0.45	$33,621.76
Liberal	David Perry	11,575	23.01	–0.04	$7,054.02
New Democratic	John Harrop	9,660	19.20	–0.35	$6,876.15
Green	Karan Bowyer	3,802	7.56	+1.60	$1,258.56
Total valid votes/expense limit		50,315	99.74	–	$83,867.47
Total rejected ballots		130	0.26	–0.18	
Turnout		50,445	62.83	–0.72	
Eligible voters		80,290			
Conservative hold		Swing		+0.25	
Source: Elections Canada

2004 Canadian federal election
Party	Candidate	Votes	%	±%	Expenditures
Conservative	Stockwell Day	24,220	49.79	–15.64	$69,676.02
Liberal	Vanessa Sutton	11,212	23.05	+2.59	$35,962.47
New Democratic	Joyce Procure	9,509	19.55	+11.10	$8,029.25
Green	Harry Naegel	2,896	5.95	+3.66	$1,105.27
Marijuana	Jack William Peach	548	1.13	–0.56	none listed
Canadian Action	Lelannd Haver	259	0.53	–0.42	$397.26
Total valid votes/expense limit		48,644	99.56	–	$80,120.46
Total rejected ballots		214	0.44	+0.10	
Turnout		48,858	63.55	–1.95	
Eligible voters		76,878			
Conservative hold		Swing		–9.10	
Source: Elections Canada

2000 Canadian federal election
Party	Candidate	Votes	%	±%	Expenditures
Alliance	Stockwell Day	28,794	59.37	–10.94	$61,098
Liberal	Tom Chapman	9,923	20.46	–	$15,521
New Democratic	Ken Ellis	4,096	8.45	–4.12	$4,470
Progressive Conservative	Gordon John Seiter	2,939	6.06	–	$697
Green	Harry Naegel	1,110	2.29	–5.37	$5,034
Marijuana	Teresa Taylor	818	1.69	–	
Canadian Action	Larry Taylor	461	0.95	–3.25	$1,502
Natural Law	Elizabeth Innes	167	0.34	–	$514
Marxist–Leninist	Dorothy-Jean O'Donnell	99	0.20	–	$123
Independent	Clay Harmon	95	0.20	–5.08	
Total valid votes		48,502	99.66		
Total rejected ballots		166	0.34	–0.11	
Turnout		48,668	65.50	+25.24	
Eligible voters		74,297			
Alliance hold		Swing		–15.70	
Source: Elections Canada

Canadian federal by-election, 11 September 2000 On the resignation of Jim Hart
Party	Candidate	Votes	%	±%
Alliance	Stockwell Day	19,417	70.30	+17.24
New Democratic	Ken Ellis	3,470	12.56	+0.81
Green	Joan Russow	2,115	7.66	+5.48
Canadian Action	Jack William Peach	1,159	4.20	–
Independent	Jim Strauss	689	2.49	–
Independent	Marc-Boris St-Maurice	438	1.59	–
Independent	Dennis Earl Baker	223	0.81	–
Independent	Rad Gajic	108	0.39	–
Total valid votes		27,619	99.55	
Total rejected ballots		124	0.45	+0.10
Turnout		27,743	40.26	–24.80
Eligible voters		68,902		
Alliance hold		Swing		+2.74
Source: Elections Canada

1997 Canadian federal election
Party	Candidate	Votes	%	±%	Expenditures
Reform	Jim Hart	24,570	53.06	–	$48,868
Liberal	Bruce Murdock	12,241	26.44	–	$66,877
New Democratic	David Finnis	5,441	11.75	–	$18,388
Progressive Conservative	Ramesh Rikhi	2,523	5.45	–	$23,815
Green	Harry Naegel	1,008	2.18	–	$691
Christian Heritage	Stuart Allan Town	318	0.69	–	$2,109
Independent	Janice G.A.E. Switlo	202	0.44	–	$550
Total valid votes		46,303	99.66		
Total rejected ballots		159	0.34	–	
Turnout		46,462	65.06	–	
Eligible voters		71,410			
Reform notional hold		Swing		–	
This riding was created from parts of Fraser Valley East and Okanagan—Similkameen—Merritt, both of which elected a Reform candidate in the previous election. Jim Hart was the incumbent from Okanagan—Similkameen—Merritt.
Source: Elections Canada

== See also ==
- List of Canadian electoral districts
- Historical federal electoral districts of Canada
- Controversies in the 2011 Canadian federal election
