= Burlington (federal electoral district) =

Federal electoral district in Ontario, Canada

Coordinates: 43.3487°N 79.7903°W

Ontario electoral district
- Interactive map of riding boundaries from the 2015 federal election

Federal electoral district
- Legislature: House of Commons
MP
Karina Gould
Liberal
- District created: 1976
- First contested: 1979
- Last contested: 2025
- District webpage: profile, map

Demographics
- Population (2011): 120,569
- Electors (2015): 94,679
- Area (km²): 84
- Pop. density (per km²): 1,435.3
- Census division: Halton
- Census subdivision: Burlington (part)

Burlington is a federal electoral district in Halton Region, Ontario, Canada, that has been represented in the House of Commons of Canada since 1979.

== Geography ==
It consists of the southern part of the city of Burlington.

The riding serves downtown Burlington and the neighbourhoods of Aldershot, Maple, Freeman, Wellington Square, Dynes, Roseland, Longmoor, Shoreacres, Pinedale, Elizabeth Gardens, Palmer, Mountainside, Brant Hills, and Tyandaga in Burlington.

A suburban swing riding, it has elected an MP from the governing party in every election since 1984.

== Demographics ==
According to the 2021 Canadian census

Languages: 79.0% English, 1.6% Spanish, 1.5% French, 1.2% Polish, 1.2% Arabic
Religions: 58.8% Christian (28.3% Catholic, 6.4% Anglican, 5.7% United Church, 2.3% Presbyterian, 2.1% Christian Orthodox, 1.1% Baptist, 12.9% other), 3.1% Muslim, 1.5% Hindu, 34.5% none
Median income: $48,000 (2020)
Average income: $66,100 (2020)

Panethnic groups in Burlington (2011−2021)
Panethnic group	2021		2016		2011	
Panethnic group	Pop.	%	Pop.	%	Pop.	%
European (Note: Statistic includes all persons that did not make up part of a visible minority or an indigenous identity.)	101,330	81.98%	104,610	86.49%	106,925	89.88%
South Asian	5,020	4.06%	3,420	2.83%	2,475	2.08%
African	3,190	2.58%	2,425	2.01%	1,795	1.51%
East Asian (Note: Statistic includes total responses of "Chinese", "Korean", and "Japanese" under visible minority section on census.)	3,135	2.54%	2,325	1.92%	2,240	1.88%
Middle Eastern (Note: Statistic includes total responses of "West Asian" and "Arab" under visible minority section on census.)	2,955	2.39%	1,760	1.46%	1,235	1.04%
Southeast Asian (Note: Statistic includes total responses of "Filipino" and "Southeast Asian" under visible minority section on census.)	2,740	2.22%	2,345	1.94%	1,430	1.2%
Latin American	1,940	1.57%	1,410	1.17%	1,050	0.88%
Indigenous	1,725	1.4%	1,530	1.27%	1,155	0.97%
Other/multiracial (Note: Statistic includes total responses of "Visible minority, n.i.e." and "Multiple visible minorities" under visible minority section on census.)	1,575	1.27%	1,115	0.92%	665	0.56%
Total responses	123,610	98.55%	120,945	98.19%	118,960	98.67%
Total population	125,435	100%	123,180	100%	120,569	100%
Notes: Totals greater than 100% due to multiple origin responses. Demographics based on 2012 Canadian federal electoral redistribution riding boundaries.

== History ==
Burlington was created in 1976 from Halton—Wentworth.

This riding gained small territories from Halton and Ancaster—Dundas—Flamborough—Westdale during the 2012 electoral redistribution.

=== Members of Parliament ===
This riding has elected the following members of Parliament:

Parliament	Years	Member	Party
Burlington; Riding created from Halton—Wentworth
31st	1979–1980	Bill Kempling	Progressive Conservative
32nd	1980–1984	Bill Kempling	Progressive Conservative
33rd	1984–1988	Bill Kempling	Progressive Conservative
34th	1988–1993	Bill Kempling	Progressive Conservative
35th	1993–1997	Paddy Torsney	Liberal
36th	1997–2000	Paddy Torsney	Liberal
37th	2000–2004	Paddy Torsney	Liberal
38th	2004–2006	Paddy Torsney	Liberal
39th	2006–2008	Mike Wallace	Conservative
40th	2008–2011	Mike Wallace	Conservative
41st	2011–2015	Mike Wallace	Conservative
42nd	2015–2019	Karina Gould	Liberal
43rd	2019–2021	Karina Gould	Liberal
44th	2021–2025	Karina Gould	Liberal
45th	2025–present	Karina Gould	Liberal

== Election results ==
Graph of election results in Burlington (minor parties that never got 2% of the vote or didn't run consistently are omitted)

2025 Canadian federal election
Party	Candidate	Votes	%	±%	Expenditures
Liberal	Karina Gould	43,593	55.8	+10.08	
Conservative	Emily Brown	31,686	40.6	+3.29	
New Democratic	Michael Beauchemin	1,549	2.0	–8.88	
Green	Kyle Hutton	595	0.8	–1.22	
People's	Michael Bator	523	0.7	–3.33	
Libertarian	Ocean Marshall	105	0.1	N/A	
Rhinoceros	Paul Harper	75	0.1	–0.08	
Total valid votes/expense limit		78,126	99.4	—	
Total rejected ballots		463	0.6	—	
Turnout		78,589	77.0	+7.3	
Eligible voters		102,123			
Liberal hold		Swing		+3.40	
Source: Elections Canada

2021 Canadian federal election
Party	Candidate	Votes	%	±%	Expenditures
Liberal	Karina Gould	31,602	45.7	–2.9	$108,267.63
Conservative	Emily Brown	25,742	37.3	+4.1	$99,594.92
New Democratic	Nick Page	7,507	10.9	+0.7	$9,478.98
People's	Michael Bator	2,764	4.0	+2.7	$7,469.57
Green	Christian Cullis	1,368	2.0	–4.6	$1,096.10
Rhinoceros	Jevin David Carroll	122	0.2	N/A	$0.00
Total valid votes/expense limit		69,105	99.4	–	$126,483.23
Total rejected ballots		424	0.6		
Turnout		69,529	69.7		
Eligible voters		99,734			
Liberal hold		Swing		–3.5	
Source: Elections Canada

2019 Canadian federal election
Party	Candidate	Votes	%	±%	Expenditures
Liberal	Karina Gould	34,989	48.61	+2.63	$106,261.57
Conservative	Jane Michael	23,930	33.24	–9.24	$86,302.63
New Democratic	Lenaee Dupuis	7,372	10.24	+1.14	$31,070.76
Green	Gareth Williams	4,750	6.60	+4.16	$6,940.18
People's	Peter Smetana	944	1.31		$5,500.00
Total valid votes/expense limit		71,985	99.17		
Total rejected ballots		600	0.83	+0.45	
Turnout		72,585	72.44	–0.76	
Eligible voters		100,201			
Liberal hold		Swing		+5.93	
Source: Elections Canada

2015 Canadian federal election
Party	Candidate	Votes	%	±%	Expenditures
Liberal	Karina Gould	32,229	45.98	+22.74	$104,313.08
Conservative	Mike Wallace	29,780	42.48	–11.66	$105,053.18
New Democratic	David Laird	6,381	9.10	–9.75	$28,503.64
Green	Vince Fiorito	1,710	2.44	–1.10	$1,631.97
Total valid votes/expense limit		70,100	99.63		$239,840.79
Total rejected ballots		263	0.37		
Turnout		70,363	73.20		
Eligible voters		96,126			
Liberal gain from Conservative		Swing		+17.20	
Source: Elections Canada

2011 federal election redistributed results
Party	Vote	%
Conservative	33,162	54.14
Liberal	14,235	23.24
New Democratic	11,549	18.85
Green	2,166	3.54
Others	140	0.23

2011 Canadian federal election
Party	Candidate	Votes	%	±%	Expenditures
Conservative	Mike Wallace	32,958	54.16	+5.56	$87,782.46
Liberal	Alyssa Brierley	14,154	23.26	-9.99	$83,688.54
New Democratic	David Carter Laird	11,449	18.81	+7.61	$17,387.19
Green	Graham Mayberry	2,151	3.53	-3.40	$4,138.76
Marxist–Leninist	Elaine Baetz	140	0.23	–	
Total valid votes/expense limit		60,852	100.00	–	$94,992.81
Total rejected ballots		175	0.29	-0.12	
Turnout		61,027	67.02	+2.03	
Eligible voters		91,058	–	–	

2008 Canadian federal election
Party	Candidate	Votes	%	±%	Expenditures
Conservative	Mike Wallace	28,614	48.60	+5.50	$82,440
Liberal	Paddy Torsney	19,577	33.25	-5.86	$86,026
New Democratic	David Carter Laird	6,597	11.20	-1.24	$21,862
Green	Marnie Mellish	4,083	6.93	+1.60	$2,280
Total valid votes/expense limit		58,871	100.00	–	$92,099
Total rejected ballots		239	0.40	+0.05	
Turnout		59,110	64.99		

2006 Canadian federal election
Party	Candidate	Votes	%	±%
Conservative	Mike Wallace	28,030	43.10	+4.8
Liberal	Paddy Torsney	25,431	39.11	-5.9
New Democratic	David Carter Laird	8,090	12.44	+1.6
Green	Rick Goldring	3,471	5.33	+0.1
Total valid votes		65,022	100.0	
Total rejected ballots		227	0.35	
Turnout		65,249	72.96	

2004 Canadian federal election
Party	Candidate	Votes	%	±%
Liberal	Paddy Torsney	27,423	45.0	-1.8
Conservative	Mike Wallace	23,389	38.4	-9.6
New Democratic	David Carter Laird	6,581	10.8	+7.2
Green	Angela Reid	3,169	5.2	
Christian Heritage	John Herman Wubs	429	0.7	
Total valid votes		60,991	100.0	

Note: Conservative vote is compared to the total of the Canadian Alliance vote and Progressive Conservative vote in 2000 election.

2000 Canadian federal election
Party	Candidate	Votes	%	±%
Liberal	Paddy Torsney	22,175	46.8	+2.7
Alliance	Don Pennell	11,500	24.3	+6.9
Progressive Conservative	Stephen Collinson	11,240	23.7	-9.0
New Democratic	Larry McMahon	1,722	3.6	-1.5
Green	Tom Snyder	771	1.6	
Total valid votes		47,408	100.0	

Note: Canadian Alliance vote is compared to the Reform vote in 1997 election.

1997 Canadian federal election
Party	Candidate	Votes	%	±%
Liberal	Paddy Torsney	22,042	44.1	0.0
Progressive Conservative	Mike Kuegle	16,344	32.7	+6.5
Reform	Terry Lamping	8,662	17.3	-5.9
New Democratic	Jim Hough	2,561	5.1	+2.1
Canadian Action	Ann Marsden	352	0.7	
Total valid votes		49,961	100.0	

1993 Canadian federal election
Party	Candidate	Votes	%	±%
Liberal	Paddy Torsney	22,785	44.1	+17.5
Progressive Conservative	Mike Kuegle	13,540	26.2	-25.9
Reform	Hugh Ramolla	11,984	23.2	
New Democratic	Jim Hough	1,554	3.0	-13.1
Independent	Bill Barlett	929	1.8	
National	Bill Watson	535	1.0	
Natural Law	Ursula Kropfel	336	0.7	
Total valid votes		51,663	100.0	

1988 Canadian federal election
Party	Candidate	Votes	%	±%
Progressive Conservative	Bill Kempling	26,293	52.1	-9.9
Liberal	James Smith	13,448	26.6	+7.8
New Democratic	Jane Mulkewich	8,149	16.1	-3.1
Christian Heritage	Ron Bremer	2,285	4.5	
Libertarian	Dan Riga	321	0.6	
Total valid votes		50,496	100.0	

1984 Canadian federal election
Party	Candidate	Votes	%	±%
Progressive Conservative	Bill Kempling	37,577	61.9	+11.2
New Democratic	Walter Mulkewich	11,687	19.3	+3.6
Liberal	Fred Schwenger	11,406	18.8	-14.0
Total valid votes		60,670	100.0	

1980 Canadian federal election
Party	Candidate	Votes	%	±%
Progressive Conservative	Bill Kempling	27,212	50.8	-5.6
Liberal	Tom Sutherland	17,574	32.8	+4.6
New Democratic	Danny Dunleavy	8,421	15.7	+1.0
Libertarian	Bruno S. Oberski	341	0.6	0.0
Marxist–Leninist	Charles Boylan	63	0.1	0.0
Total valid votes		53,611	100.0	
lop.parl.ca

1979 Canadian federal election
Party	Candidate	Votes	%
Progressive Conservative	Bill Kempling	32,225	56.4
Liberal	Tom Sutherland	16,100	28.2
New Democratic	Danny Dunleavy	8,421	14.7
Libertarian	John Lawson	365	0.6
Marxist–Leninist	Charles Boylan	62	0.1
Total valid votes		57,173	100.0

== See also ==
- List of Canadian electoral districts
- Historical federal electoral districts of Canada
