= Mike Wallace (politician) =

Canadian politician

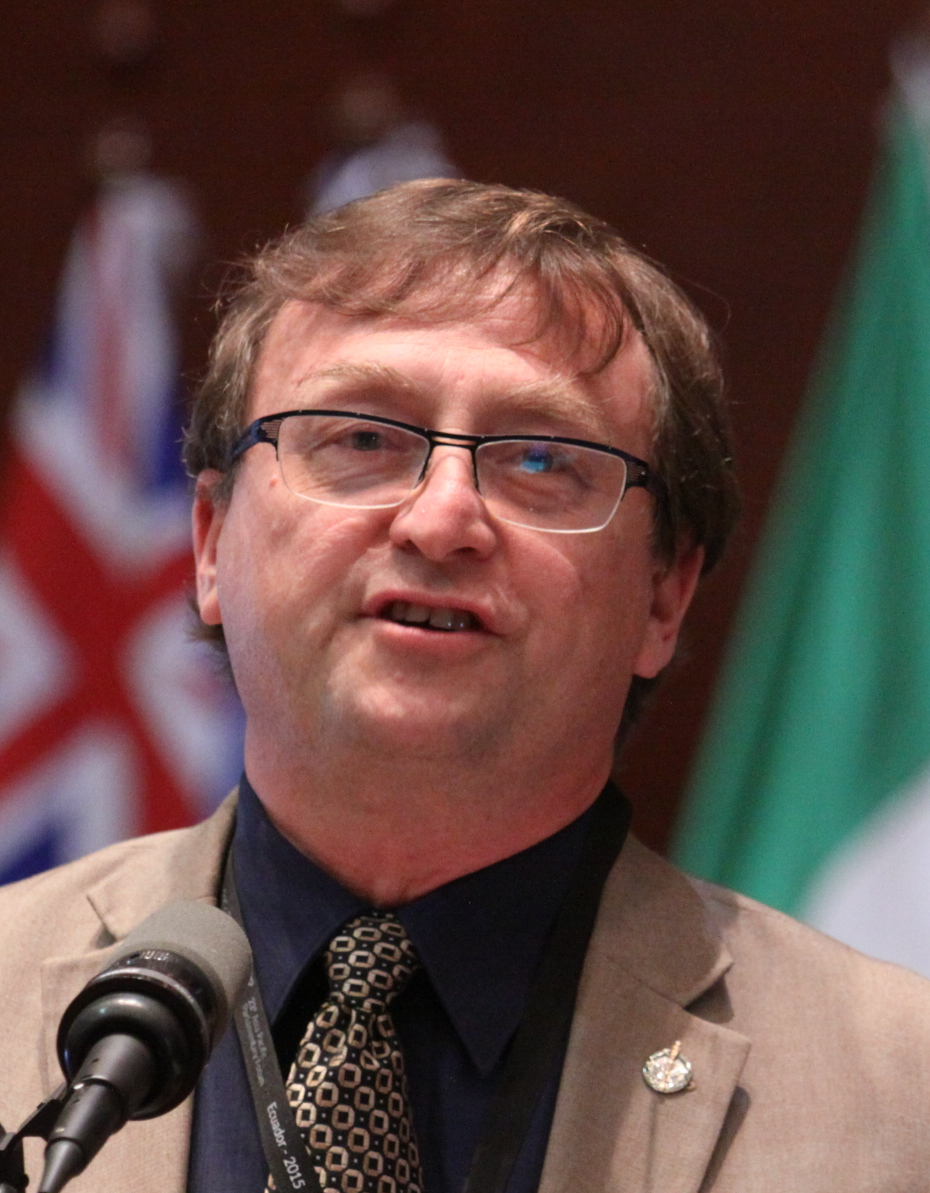
- Wallace in 2015

Member of Parliament for Burlington
- In office January 23, 2006 – August 4, 2015
- Preceded by: Paddy Torsney
- Succeeded by: Karina Gould

Chair of the Standing Committee on Justice
- In office February 4, 2013 – 2015
- Minister: Rob Nicholson; Peter MacKay
- Preceded by: Dave MacKenzie

Personal details
- Born: Michael L. Wallace; September 3, 1963 (age 62) Brockville, Ontario, Canada
- Party: Conservative
- Spouse: Caroline Wallace
- Profession: Burlington City Council

Michael L. Wallace (born September 3, 1963) is a Canadian politician. He successfully stood for councillor in Burlington, Ontario in 1994 and was re-elected three times. He represented the electoral district of Burlington from 2006 to 2015 in the House of Commons of Canada as a member of the Conservative Party of Canada. While there, he chaired the Standing Committee on Justice and Human Rights and the Conservative Marine Caucus. He was defeated in the 2015 federal election by Karina Gould.

== Councillor ==
Born in Brockville, Ontario, Wallace was first elected to Burlington City Council in the fall of 1994, representing the southeast area of Burlington, now Ward 5. He was re-elected in 1997, 2000, and 2003. Before running for councillor, Wallace graduated from the University of Guelph, majoring in political science.

Wallace was nominated as the candidate for the newly formed Conservative Party for the 2004 federal election, running against long-time Liberal incumbent Paddy Torsney. A resurgence in the Liberal support across Ontario resulted in a 4,000-vote victory for Torsney.

Wallace did not resign as councillor for the 2004 federal election and continued to represent Ward 5.

== Conservative MP ==
Mike Wallace represented Burlington in the House of Commons of Canada.

Wallace is a graduate of the University of Guelph, and majored in Political Science. He moved to Burlington with his wife Caroline in 1987 with his two daughters, Ashley and Lindsay. He was elected to Burlington City Council in 1994, re-elected in 1997, 2000 and 2003 then elected as the federal MP for Burlington in 2006. He was re-elected in 2008 and 2011.

Wallace's work on the Hill included being the Chair of the Standing Committee on Justice and Human Rights. He also chaired the Conservative Marine Caucus and was part of the inter-party Steel Caucus. Wallace was also on the executive of the Canada Japan Parliamentary Association as well as on the board of the Canada Ukraine Friendship group.

He ran for reelection in 2015 and was defeated by Karina Gould.

== Electoral record ==
2015 Canadian federal election: Burlington
Party	Candidate	Votes	%	±%	Expenditures
Liberal	Karina Gould	32,229	45.98	+22.74	$104,313.08
Conservative	Mike Wallace	29,780	42.48	–11.66	$105,053.18
New Democratic	David Laird	6,381	9.10	–9.75	$28,503.64
Green	Vince Fiorito	1,710	2.44	–1.10	$1,631.97
Total valid votes/expense limit		70,100	99.63		$239,840.79
Total rejected ballots		263	0.37		
Turnout		70,363	73.20		
Eligible voters		96,126			
Liberal gain from Conservative		Swing		+17.20	
Source: Elections Canada

2011 Canadian federal election: Burlington
Party	Candidate	Votes	%	±%	Expenditures
Conservative	Mike Wallace	32,958	54.16	+5.56	$87,782.46
Liberal	Alyssa Brierley	14,154	23.26	-9.99	$83,688.54
New Democratic	David Carter Laird	11,449	18.81	+7.61	$17,387.19
Green	Graham Mayberry	2,151	3.53	-3.40	$4,138.76
Marxist–Leninist	Elaine Baetz	140	0.23	–	
Total valid votes/expense limit		60,852	100.00	–	$94,992.81
Total rejected ballots		175	0.29	-0.12	
Turnout		61,027	67.02	+2.03	
Eligible voters		91,058	–	–	

2008 Canadian federal election: Burlington
Party	Candidate	Votes	%	±%	Expenditures
Conservative	Mike Wallace	28,614	48.60	+5.50	$82,440
Liberal	Paddy Torsney	19,577	33.25	-5.86	$86,026
New Democratic	David Carter Laird	6,597	11.20	-1.24	$21,862
Green	Marnie Mellish	4,083	6.93	+1.60	$2,280
Total valid votes/expense limit		58,871	100.00	–	$92,099
Total rejected ballots		239	0.40	+0.05	
Turnout		59,110	64.99		
