= Mary Anne Jablonski =

Canadian politician (born c.1952)

The Honourable Mary Anne Jablonski ECA MLA

MLA for Red Deer North
- In office September 25, 2000 – May 5, 2015
- Preceded by: Stockwell Day
- Succeeded by: Kim Schreiner

Minister of Seniors and Community Supports in the Alberta government
- In office March 13, 2008 – October 12, 2011
- Preceded by: Greg Melchin
- Succeeded by: George VanderBurg

Personal details
- Born: c. 1952 (age 73–74) St. Catharines, Ontario
- Party: Progressive Conservative
- Spouse: Bob

Mary Anne Jablonski ECA MLA (born c. 1952) is a Canadian politician and former Member of the Legislative Assembly of Alberta representing the constituency of Red Deer North as a Progressive Conservative.

== Early life ==
Jablonski was born and raised with three sisters and a brother in St. Catharines, Ontario. She studied psychology and political science at Brock University on scholarship. She married her husband, Bob, in 1971. The couple has three children.

In 1980, Bob was transferred to Penhold with the Canadian Forces and the family moved to Alberta with him. Mary Anne Jablonski participated in a successful lobby effort in the early 1980s, petitioning the federal government for dental plans for families of military personnel and Royal Canadian Mounted Police (RCMP) members, and promoting the rights of military spouses.

Jablonski worked in a bank for seven years. She and her husband also owned and operated a fiberglass manufacturing company for many years. They employed 18 people and produced a variety of objects, including waterslides, jet boats and RV parts.

== Political career ==
Jablonski was first elected in a 2000 by-election to fill a spot left vacant by Stockwell Day, who resigned to seek the leadership of the federal Canadian Alliance party. Since her election, Jablonski has been a member of numerous committees and chaired the Cabinet Policy Committee on Community Services; Alberta Mental Health Board Liaison and Advisory Committee; Standing Policy Committee on Justice and Government Services; Youth Secretariat; and Corrections Review Committee.

Jablonski was elected to her fourth term representing the constituency of Red Deer North in the 2008 provincial election. Premier Ed Stelmach appointed her minister of Seniors and Community Supports on March 13, 2008. Stelmach gave Jablonski a mandate of improving quality, supply and choice in the continuing care system, and supporting persons with disabilities' independence and self-reliance through employability incentives. In addition, Jablonski formed a Demographic Planning Commission to consult with Albertans and to develop an Aging Population Framework. She also began meeting with major stakeholder groups and touring care facilities throughout Alberta.

As of January 2010, she is being criticized for cuts being made to Alberta's Person's With Developmental Disabilities Program (P.D.D.). In response to public criticism of cuts to the PDD program Jablonski has clarified that, "due to fiscal restraint measures taken across government, this increase is reduced by $11.3 million, or about two per cent of the overall program budget. The end result is still an increase to the PDD budget of approximately $22 million." Many people involved in the care of Persons with a Developmental Disability, feel that the cuts are "the wrong decision."

She announced in January 2015 that she would not seek re-election in the coming provincial election.

== Personal life ==
Jablonski lives with her husband Bob in Red Deer. The couple has three adult children and five grandchildren. In her free time, she enjoys camping and hiking with family.

Jablonski has been active in many community groups, including the Catholic Women's League, Girl Guides of Canada and the Chamber of Commerce. In 1999, as a member of ITC (formerly Toast Mistresses), she won the international speech competition in Kobe, Japan.

== Election results ==
Alberta provincial by-election, September 25, 2000: Red Deer-North
| Party | Candidate | Votes | % | ±% |
|---|---|---|---|---|
| Progressive Conservative | Mary Anne Jablonski | 2,026 | 48.82 | −6.63 |
| Liberal | Norm McDougall | 1,634 | 39.37 | 9.21 |
| Alberta First | Patti Argent | 338 | 8.15 | 0.39 |
| New Democratic | Linda Roth | 152 | 3.66 | −2.97 |
| Total | | 4,150 | | |
| Rejected, spoiled and declined | | 7 | | |
| Eligible electors / turnout | | 20,409 | 20.37 | |
| Progressive Conservative hold | | Swing | | −7.92 |
Source(s) Alberta. Chief Electoral Officer (2000). The Report of the Chief Electoral Officer on the Edmonton-Highlands By-election held June 12, 2000 and the Red Deer-North By-election held September 25, 2000 (PDF) (Report). Edmonton: Legislative Assembly of Alberta; Chief Electoral Officer.

2001 Alberta general election: Red Deer-North
| Party | Candidate | Votes | % | ±% |
|---|---|---|---|---|
| Progressive Conservative | Mary Anne Jablonski | 5,025 | 57.10% | 8.28% |
| Liberal | Norm McDougall | 3,110 | 35.34% | −4.03% |
| Alberta First | E. Patricia "Patti" Argent | 356 | 4.05% | −4.10% |
| New Democratic | Jim Guthrie | 309 | 3.51% | −0.15% |
| Total | | 8,800 | – | – |
| Rejected, spoiled and declined | | 20 | – | – |
| Eligible electors / turnout | | 21,651 | 40.73% | 20.36% |
| Progressive Conservative hold | | Swing | | 6.16% |
Source(s) Source: "Red Deer-North Official Results 2001 Alberta general election" (PDF). Elections Alberta.

| 2004 Alberta general election results ( Red Deer-North ) | | Turnout 39.1% | |
| Affiliation | Candidate | Votes | % |
| Progressive Conservative | Mary Anne Jablonski | 3,733 | 42.8% |
| Liberal | Norm McDougall | 2,647 | 30.4% |
| Alberta Alliance | Rand Sisson | 1,657 | 19.0% |
| NDP | Steven Bedford | 432 | 5.0% |
| Green | Colin Fisher | 244 | 2.8% |

| 2008 Alberta general election results ( Red Deer-North ) | | Turnout 29.5% | |
| Affiliation | Candidate | Votes | % |
| Progressive Conservative | Mary Anne Jablonski | 4,715 | 57.9% |
| Liberal | Richard Farrand | 1,770 | 21.7% |
| Green | Rueben Tschetter | 463 | 5.7% |
| NDP | Shawn Nielsen | 560 | 6.9% |
| Wildrose Alliance | Urs Lehner | 630 | 7.7% |
