= Adriana LaGrange =

Canadian politician

The Honourable Adriana LaGrange ECA MLA
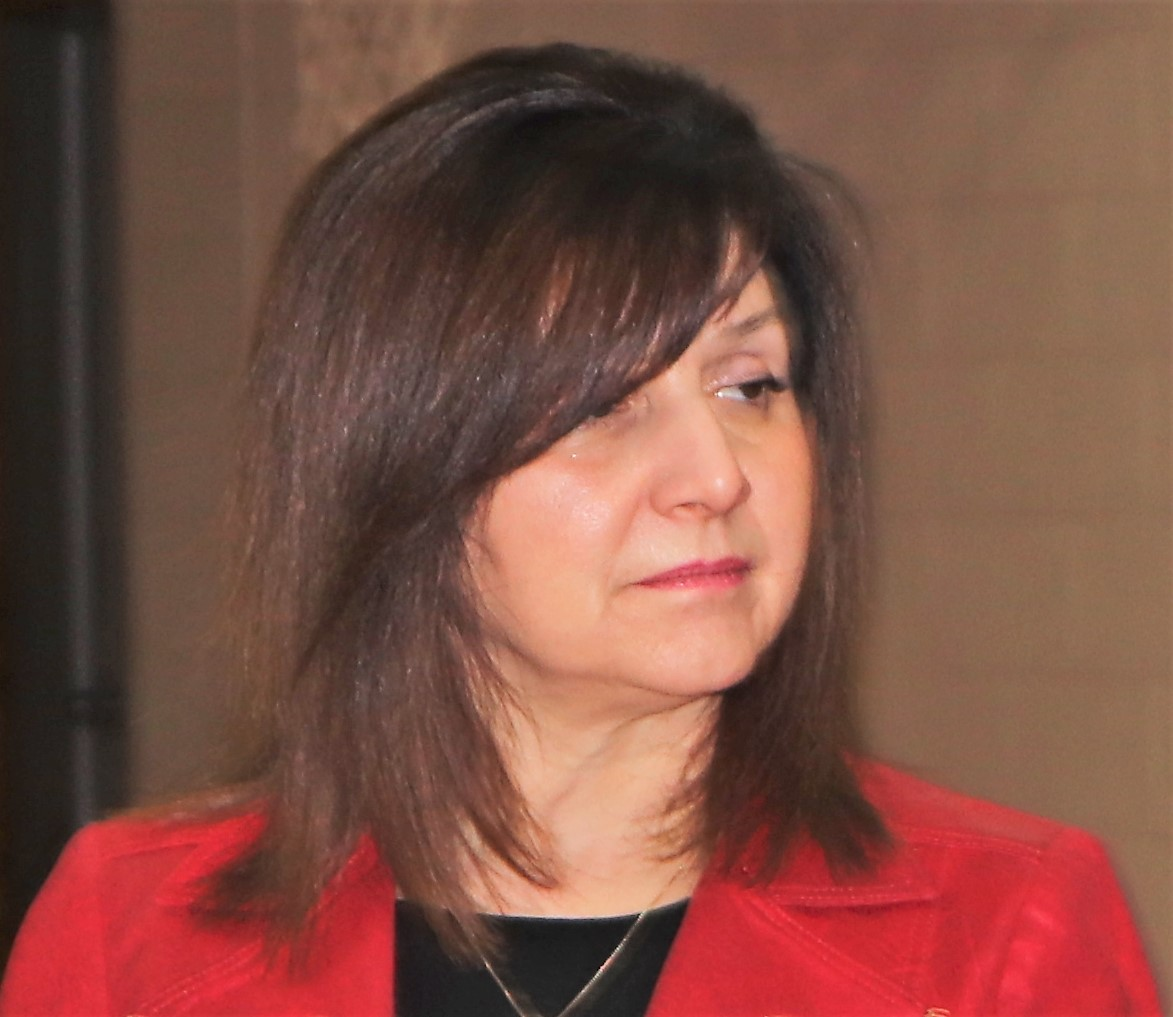

Minister of Hospital and Surgical Services of Alberta
- Incumbent
- Assumed office May 21, 2026
- Premier: Danielle Smith
- Preceded by: Matt Jones

Minister of Primary and Preventive Health Services of Alberta
- In office May 16, 2025 – May 21, 2026
- Premier: Danielle Smith
- Preceded by: Herself as Minister of Health

Minister of Health of Alberta
- In office June 9, 2023 – May 16, 2025
- Premier: Danielle Smith
- Preceded by: Jason Copping
- Succeeded by: Matt Jones as Hospital and Surgical Health Services; Herself as Primary and Preventive Health Services

Minister of Education of Alberta
- In office April 30, 2019 – June 9, 2023
- Premier: Jason Kenney, Danielle Smith
- Preceded by: David Eggen
- Succeeded by: Demetrios Nicolaides

Member of the Legislative Assembly of Alberta for Red Deer-North
- Incumbent
- Assumed office April 16, 2019
- Preceded by: Kim Schreiner

Personal details
- Born: 1961 or 1962 (age 64–65) Guelph, Ontario, Canada
- Party: United Conservative Party
- Education: Diploma of Rehab Studies
- Alma mater: Humber College
- Occupation: Rehabilitative Practitioner, School Trustee

Adriana LaGrange ECA MLA (born 1961 or 1962) is a Canadian politician elected in the 2019 Alberta general election to represent the electoral district of Red Deer-North in the 30th Alberta Legislature.

Originally from Ontario, LaGrange moved to Red Deer, Alberta in 1981. LaGrange was elected on April 16, 2019, and was appointed as the Minister of Education on April 30, 2019. In the 2019 Alberta general election, LaGrange won her constituency with a total of 12,739 votes based on a 62.6% voter turnout in Red Deer-North. After LaGrange's re-election as an MLA in 2023, she was appointed Minister of Health. On May 16, 2025, the Health portfolio was split, with LaGrange moving to Minister of Primary and Preventive Health Services. She became Minister of Hospital and Surgical Services in 2026.

== Career ==
LaGrange received a diploma in Rehabilitation Studies from Humber College, and worked with people who had mental and physical disabilities before entering the political arena. In her time in Red Deer, LaGrange has served as the president of the Alberta Catholic School Trustees' Association until her resignation in June 2018, vice-president of the Canadian Catholic School Trustees' Association, and has also served as a trustee on the Red Deer Catholic School board between 2007 and 2018. LaGrange is the former president of Red-Deer Pro-Life, and was on the board of directors for Alberta pro-life. The Campaign Life Coalition, a conservative Christian pro-life and anti-abortion advocacy group, lists LaGrange as a supporter of CLC principles.

== Political career ==
LaGrange ran her campaign specifically on improving healthcare in the Red Deer area, re-configuring the education system, and lowering taxes to create jobs in Alberta. LaGrange used various mediums to communicate her platform to the public, including door-to-door canvassing, hiring volunteers, and using social media.

=== Minister of Education ===
Since her appointment to the Minister of Education, LaGrange has announced various legislation concerning Alberta's education system. On June 5, 2019, LaGrange introduced the new Education Act under the United Conservative Party. LaGrange was criticized in the legislature by the leader of the official opposition, Rachel Notley, for articles of the new Education Act that removed protections for LGBTQ+ students. LaGrange claimed that the Act would implement the 'most advanced Gay–straight alliance provisions in all of Canada'. Despite this claim, the Education Amendment Act removed provisions implemented by the previous NDP government designed to protect LGBTQ+ students. This included removing a prohibition on informing parents when a student joins a gay-straight alliance, and eliminating a requirement that students be permitted to use words such as "gay" or "queer" in naming their club. Tonya Callaghan, an associate professor at the University of Calgary, described this as "homophobic" and "heterosexist." The changes to the Education Act sparked rallies and a province-wide walkout from thousands of Alberta students, with advocates claiming that the changes would cause harm to LGBTQ+ students.

On August 22, 2019, LaGrange appointed a panel of education consultants from a variety of school districts and post secondary institutions to review the province's curriculum. On October 23, 2019, LaGrange announced that the United Conservative Party planned to revise the usage of seclusion rooms in public schools, limiting them only to situations of "last resort". On November 1, 2019, LaGrange announced that the United Conservative Party had plans to build 15 new schools in Alberta.

On November 20, 2019, LaGrange announced an independent financial audit and governance review of the Calgary Board of Education after the Board announced the cutting of 300 temporary teaching jobs. After the announcement of layoffs, LaGrange claimed that the UCP was not aware of the layoffs prior to them occurring.

On March 28, 2020, LaGrange implemented budgets cuts to school boards in Alberta, directing them to lay off approximately 20,000 - 25,000 employees, mainly educational assistants. LaGrange had previously promised to maintain funding for schools during the pandemic. This was the biggest single layoff in Canadian history by a single employer. The Alberta Government announced that education funding was restored to its previous levels on July 1, 2020, but many of the funding cuts have not been reversed.

LaGrange's as Ministry of Education passed the Students First Act on December 1, 2021, which established a database “detailing the professional standing of all Alberta-certified teachers and teacher leaders” The Students First Act was widely criticized as an attempt to remove the authority of the Alberta Teachers Association (ATA) to discipline teachers in Alberta, putting this power in the hands of the government instead. President of the ATA, Jason Schilling called the rewrite an "attempt to distract", and an attempt to "spin a 15-year-old discipline case" as cover for an "attack on teachers". The act further implemented background checks every five years for teachers, in addition to initial hiring background checks.

On May 31, 2022, the Education (Reforming Teacher Profession Discipline) Act was passed, which brought all teachers, principals and superintendents under one discipline process, and made an independent commission to investigate and oversee that process. Additionally, the bill introduced “new requirements for key individuals in the education system... to report to the police where there has been serious harm or a threat to student safety.” LaGrange and the UCP claimed that under the old legislation, the Alberta Teacher’s Association was "not under any obligation to report potential criminal behaviour on the part of teachers to police," but provided no evidence to prove this, except for a 15-year-old discipline case. The new code of conduct took effect January 1, 2023.

=== Curriculum review ===
In response to drafts of the curriculum published by the CBC in October 2020, critics said that the social science and fine arts curriculum was "disconnected from current research" and favoured "white, European perspectives".

A Calgary-based lawyer, William French, hired by the department, recommended resources from the Charlottesville, Virginia-based Core Knowledge Foundation's resources for the new fine arts and literature curriculum. This included a list of 80 songs which was largely copied from a 2001 Core Knowledge document to be taught in primary school—songs that most Albertans would know, but critics claimed were outdated or racist.

In December 2020, the department invited thirty academics including University of Alberta social studies professor, Carla Peck, to review a draft of the curriculum. Peck found that the curriculum was "hugely overloaded, with lists of information, with names and places." Education professor at the University of Alberta, Dwayne Donald, said that the "social studies curriculum is written like a "moral success story" of western civilization. By February, 19 advisors including several from outside Alberta reviewed drafts of a new provincial elementary school curriculum.

According to a Calgary Herald article, LaGrange said the new curriculum focused on improving literacy and numeracy. It included computer programming, financial literacy, diversity in Alberta, and the "idea of consent to prevent sexual exploitation".

The new curriculum was based on the hypothesis that "there is a common cache of knowledge every child should know, and which should be taught in chronological order," an approach that some curriculum experts "panned as outdated and with no basis in modern research."

Feedback sessions were planned to run from April 2021 through February 2022, during which time LaGrange expected some classrooms would begin using the draft. As of September the government intended to develop new resources with a budget of $6 million in 2021. The new curriculum was planned to be introduced in some classrooms in September 2021.

Concerns were raised that the curriculum had plagiarism and errors of fact, including lifting content from Wikipedia without appropriate attribution, which would indicate a lack of due diligence and a lack of consultation with subject-matter experts.

On May 23, 2021, at the Alberta Teachers' Association Annual Representative Assembly, a motion of non-confidence in LaGrange was passed with 99% of delegates voting in favour.

In June 2021, LaGrange's domain name for her personal website expired, prompting a cybersecurity consultant to purchase the domain and host a new website with a message criticizing the "out of touch" curriculum, saying that "Adriana LaGrange does not understand how technology works. Otherwise, she would not have let her domain name expire." In exchange for returning the domain, the site requested LaGrange to donate $2,500 to Science Alberta Foundation Mindfuel, a STEM charity.

A recall petition against LaGrange was approved by Elections Alberta on November 27, 2025. Signature collection runs from December 6, 2025 to March 5, 2026, requiring 11,174 signatures.

== Electoral history ==
=== 2023 general election ===
2023 Alberta general election: Red Deer-North
| Party | Candidate | Votes | % | ±% |
|---|---|---|---|---|
| United Conservative | Adriana LaGrange | 10,629 | 57.47 | -3.14 |
| New Democratic | Jaelene Tweedle | 7,144 | 38.63 | +15.44 |
| Alberta Independence | Vicky Bayford | 281 | 1.52 | +0.34 |
| Green | Heather Morigeau | 257 | 1.39 | – |
| Solidarity Movement | Kallie Dyck | 183 | 0.98 | – |
| Total | | 18,494 | 99.30 | – |
| Rejected and declined | | 130 | 0.70 | |
| Turnout | | 18,624 | 55.48 | |
| Eligible voters | | 33,568 | | |
| United Conservative hold | | Swing | | -9.29 |
Source(s) Source: Elections Alberta

=== 2019 general election ===
2019 Alberta general election: Red Deer-North
| Party | Candidate | Votes | % | ±% |
|---|---|---|---|---|
| United Conservative | Adriana LaGrange | 12,739 | 60.61% | 13.28% |
| New Democratic | Kim Schreiner | 4,873 | 23.18% | -6.18% |
| Alberta Party | Paul Hardy | 2,769 | 13.17% | 9.14% |
| Freedom Conservative | Matt Chapin | 389 | 1.85% | – |
| Alberta Independence | Michael Neufeld | 248 | 1.18% | – |
| Total | | 21,018 | – | – |
| Rejected, spoiled and declined | | 149 | – | – |
| Eligible electors / turnout | | 31,975 | 66.20% | 17.56% |
| United Conservative gain from New Democratic | | Swing | | 16.36% |
Source(s) Source: "78 - Red Deer-North, 2019 Alberta general election". officialresults.elections.ab.ca. Elections Alberta.
