= Stockwell Day =

Canadian politician (born 1950)

The Honourable Stockwell Day PC ECA
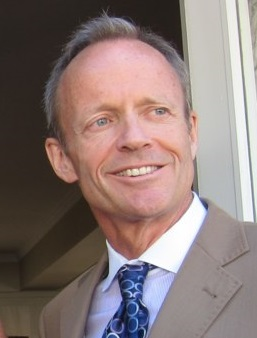
- Day in 2010

President of the Treasury Board
- In office January 29, 2010 – May 18, 2011
- Prime Minister: Stephen Harper
- Preceded by: Vic Toews
- Succeeded by: Tony Clement

Minister of International Trade
- In office October 30, 2008 – January 19, 2010
- Prime Minister: Stephen Harper
- Preceded by: Michael Fortier
- Succeeded by: Peter Van Loan

Minister of Public Safety
- In office February 6, 2006 – October 30, 2008
- Prime Minister: Stephen Harper
- Preceded by: Anne McLellan
- Succeeded by: Peter Van Loan

Leader of the Opposition
- In office September 11, 2000 – December 11, 2001
- Preceded by: Deborah Grey
- Succeeded by: John Reynolds

Leader of the Canadian Alliance
- In office July 8, 2000 – December 11, 2001
- Preceded by: Deborah Grey (interim)
- Succeeded by: John Reynolds (interim)
Alberta Executive Council
Provincial Treasurer
In office March 29, 1997 – June 1, 2000
Premier	Ralph Klein
Preceded by	Jim Dinning
Succeeded by	Steve West
Minister of Family and Social Services
In office May 31, 1996 – March 29, 1997
Premier	Ralph Klein
Preceded by	Mike Cardinal
Succeeded by	Lyle Oberg
Minister of Labour
In office December 14, 1992 – May 31, 1996
Premier	Ralph Klein
Preceded by	Elaine McCoy
Succeeded by	Murray Smith
Parliamentary constituencies
Member of Parliament for Okanagan—Coquihalla
In office September 11, 2000 – May 2, 2011
Preceded by	Jim Hart
Succeeded by	Dan Albas
Member of the Legislative Assembly of Alberta for Red Deer-North
In office May 8, 1986 – July 11, 2000
Preceded by	Jim McPherson (Red Deer)
Succeeded by	Mary Anne Jablonski

Personal details
- Born: Stockwell Burt Day Jr. August 16, 1950 (age 76) Barrie, Ontario, Canada
- Party: Conservative (since 2003)
- Other political affiliations: Progressive Conservative (provincial; 1986–2000); Canadian Alliance (2000–2003)
- Spouse: Valorie Martin (m. 1971)
- Children: 3
- Education: University of Victoria (no degree)
- Occupation: Politician; auctioneer; businessman; school administrator

Stockwell Burt Day Jr. PC ECA (born August 16, 1950) is a former Canadian politician who served as leader of the Canadian Alliance from 2000 to 2001 and later as a member of the Conservative Party of Canada.

A provincial cabinet minister from Alberta, Day served as minister of labour, minister of social services, and treasurer under Premier Ralph Klein. He successfully ran for leader of the newly formed Canadian Alliance against former Reform Party leader Preston Manning, winning that position on July 8, 2000. Following his election as leader, Day won the by-election to become the member of Parliament (MP) for the riding of Okanagan—Coquihalla in British Columbia. In the 2000 federal election, the Alliance under Day only made modest gains, increasing their seat count from 58 to 66. A breakthrough in the East did not happen, and the Liberal Party under Prime Minister Jean Chrétien won a third consecutive majority government.

After the election, Day's leadership of the party was met with criticism, with a caucus revolt taking place. Following the election, Day lost his role as leader, but continued to serve as an MP. He then held several cabinet portfolios under Prime Minister Stephen Harper and was widely seen as a prominent voice for social conservatives within the Conservative Party. Day did not seek re-election in the 2011 federal election.

== Early life and career ==
Day was born in Barrie, Ontario, the son of Gwendolyn "Gwen" (née Gilbert) and Stockwell Day Sr. He lived in a number of places in Canada during his youth, including Atlantic Canada; Ottawa, where he attended Ashbury College; and Montreal, where he graduated from Westmount High School. He attended the University of Victoria and Vanguard College, then known as Northwest Bible College, in Edmonton, Alberta, but did not graduate from either.

His father, who was born in Montreal, was long associated with the Social Credit Party of Canada. In the 1972 federal election, he was the Social Credit candidate running against New Democratic Party leader Tommy Douglas in the riding of Nanaimo—Cowichan—The Islands. Day Sr. supported Doug Christie and was a member of the Western Canada Concept.

From 1978 to 1985, Day was assistant pastor and school administrator at the Bentley Christian Centre in Bentley, Alberta. His school taught the Accelerated Christian Education curriculum.

== Career in provincial politics ==
In 1986, Day was elected to represent Red Deer North in the Legislative Assembly of Alberta as a Progressive Conservative (PC), a position that he held until 2000.

In December 1992, newly elected Alberta premier Ralph Klein brought Day into his cabinet as his minister of labour, a position in which he oversaw controversial changes in his ministry, including layoffs in the civil service. In this role, Day was credited with working with all of Alberta's Public Service Unions to achieve an unprecedented five per cent voluntary reduction in their collective agreements. While Day was minister of labour, Alberta had the lowest number of days lost due to labour disputes of any province. As Minister Responsible for the Worker's Compensation Board, Day oversaw the elimination of the Compensation Board's unfunded liability of $600 million. This led to a general reduction in premiums for businesses and a general increase in workers' benefits.

In October 1994, Government House Leader was added to his responsibility. In May 1996, Day was made Minister of Social Services and, in March 1997, he became Treasurer. As Treasurer, Day oversaw a continued paying down of Alberta's debt while he cut taxes, instituting a flat tax rate in 1999.

In April 1999, while Day was still Treasurer, he wrote a letter criticizing Red Deer lawyer and public school board trustee Lorne Goddard for representing a defendant who was ultimately convicted on charges of possessing child pornography. In the letter, Day suggested that Goddard's argument in court that the Canadian Constitution protected his client's right to possess child pornography implied that he himself believed that pedophiles have the right to own such materials and that this further implies that he also must believe that teachers should have the right to pornographic images of their students.

In response, Goddard sued Day for defamation. The suit was eventually settled on December 22, 2000, in the plaintiff's favour. According to an adjudication order from the Office of the Information and Privacy Commissioner of Alberta, the total settlement cost for the suit was $792,064.40, including $60,000 in damages paid to the plaintiff, costs that were paid by Alberta taxpayers. However, Day eventually paid back the Alberta Government the $60,000 in damages out of his own pocket. Additionally, Day later wrote a letter to a local paper in his riding as a member of Parliament expressing deep regret "that my former friend Lorne Goddard and his family, have been personally hurt."

== Leadership of the Canadian Alliance ==
In 2000, Day decided to run for leader of the newly formed Canadian Alliance party. After a heavily publicized campaign, Day came in first on the June 24 first ballot of the leadership election with about 44 per cent of the vote, in front of former Reform Party leader Preston Manning and Ontario PC strategist Tom Long. In the following runoff election against Manning, held on July 8, 2000, Day received 63.4 per cent.

Looking for a way to get into Parliament, Day decided against running in his hometown riding of Red Deer, even though it was comfortably safe for the Alliance. Instead, he ran in a by-election in the equally safe riding of Okanagan—Coquihalla, British Columbia after incumbent Reform/CA MP Jim Hart stood down in his favour—a standard practice in most parliamentary systems when a newly elected leader doesn't have a seat in Parliament. Day won the by-election on September 11, 2000, arriving at his first news conference on a Jet Ski wearing a wetsuit.

=== 2000 election ===
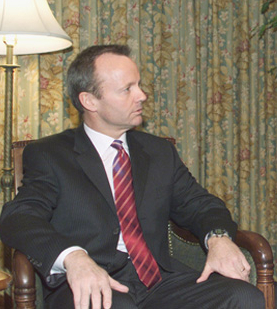
Stockwell Day, December 2000

A few weeks after Day entered the House of Commons, Jean Chrétien called a snap election for November 27, 2000, which would not give the newly formed Canadian Alliance time to consolidate itself. Nonetheless, the new party went into the election with high hopes, as Day was expected to appeal far more to the crucial Ontario voters than his predecessors.

There were few, if any, important issues when the election was called; nonetheless, the Liberals frequently alleged that Day had a hidden agenda, identifying Day with the Christian right, and drawing attention to his past comments about homosexuality and abortion.

In an interview published in the alternative weekly Montreal Mirror on June 8, Day addressed some of the perceptions that he was homophobic. He began by denying that he had ever referred to homosexuality as a "mental disorder". He acknowledged having gay staff working on his campaign: "First of all, as far as my campaign, I don't ask people if they're homosexual, lesbian or heterosexual. People who are working on my campaign are doing so because they believe in me. That doesn't mean that they necessarily agree 100 per cent with everything I believe. But in principle they're saying we think you can take this Alliance to the next step and we think you'd be good for Canada. So I don't ask. Nobody has to pass a sex test to be on this campaign." But the statement that made headlines in newspapers across the country was Day's acknowledgment that he would indeed consider using the Notwithstanding Clause to block a Supreme Court decision legalizing same-sex marriage, then a distinct possibility that was unnerving many social conservatives. After being pressed by journalist Matthew Hays on the Notwithstanding Clause question, Day replied "Yes, and the reason I say that is because such a significant number of constituents would reflect concern on that and would want the discussion. The Alberta position on this is that the definition of marriage changing would allow for the use of the Notwithstanding Clause. That's because the sense of the elected officials in Alberta is that the people would be significantly motivated on that issue."

Liberal activist Warren Kinsella mocked Day's belief in young Earth creationism by pulling out a Barney doll during a television interview and stating that "this was the only dinosaur ever to be on Earth with humans". Media covering the Day campaign bus, nicknamed "Prayer Force One", hummed The Flintstones theme song to mock the idea that humans and dinosaurs co-existed.

During the 2000 election, the CBC ran an extended documentary purporting to review Day's religious beliefs. In this documentary the CBC interviewed Professor Pliny Hayes, Chair of the Department of Natural Sciences at Red Deer College, who reported that Day said in a speech at the college that there is scientific proof that the world is about 6,000 years old and that early man co-existed with dinosaurs. Day filed a complaint with the CBC for the fact that he was at no time asked for comment on the matter.

When subsequently asked by reporters about his beliefs, Day said he didn't think his beliefs "should be used in any kind of detrimental way in an election campaign." Day's spokesman Phil Von Finckenstein said the Alliance believes that other theories of creation should be taught alongside evolution in schools, but he also recognizes education is a provincial jurisdiction.

The Alliance's direct democracy proposals, which would have required a referendum on any proposal supported by a petition signed by three per cent of Canadian voters, were also frequently targeted as a suggestion of a hidden agenda. Some asserted that "special interest" groups would use the low requirements to put contentious subjects to a national referendum. Day himself never did support the threshold, explaining that he would need to consult with Canadians over what the threshold should be. The proposal was satirized by Rick Mercer of This Hour Has 22 Minutes, where he proposed a national petition for a referendum to demand that Day change his first name to Doris, which reached the threshold advocated by The Alliance.

Another gaffe took place when the Day campaign used the hit single "Ordinary Day" by Great Big Sea at a rally without permission. The band demanded that Day's campaign cease using the song for campaigning purposes.

Day was also a victim of an incident during the election. When making a "grand entrance" for a speech at Conestoga College, activist Julian Ichim splashed him with two litres of chocolate milk from the front of the stage, saying he did it to protest Day's "homophobic, anti-immigrant and anti-poor agenda". Afterward, again on This Hour Has 22 Minutes, actress Mary Walsh jokingly offered Day chocolate milk, saying: "All they had was homo, and I knew [Day] wouldn't like that."

Day stumbled during two campaign appearances in the first week. A photo-op at a technology firm meant to illustrate a "brain drain" to the US was undermined when the owner reported that he had moved to Canada from the United States eight years earlier. The next day, at Niagara Falls, Day remarked that Canadian jobs were flowing south "just like the Niagara River", when in fact the river flows north. In mid-campaign, the Alliance candidate in Winnipeg South Centre, Betty Granger, was quoted as voicing concerns about an "Asian invasion" in Canada. And in the televised leaders' debate, Day held up a handwritten sign saying "NO 2-TIER HEALTHCARE" in large letters to counter a newspaper headline in The Globe and Mail earlier in the campaign. As props were against the rules, he claimed it was his briefing notes. Progressive Conservative leader Joe Clark retorted, "Mr. Day appears to be running for office as some kind of game show host." The debate went poorly for Day, with the Toronto Star and The Globe and Mail describing him as "the big loser" of the night.

At one point, the Alliance was at 30.5 per cent in the polls, and some thought they could win a minority government. On election night, the Alliance increased their seats over Reform totals from 60 to 66 and kept Reform's strong representation in western Canada, but the hoped-for breakthrough in Ontario did not occur, with the party electing just two MPs in that province. However, the Alliance increased their overall vote totals by over one million and reduced the Progressive Conservatives to 12 seats in the House of Commons. The Liberals' attacks on Day ended up decimating the NDP and Progressive Conservatives, as many voters who would otherwise have supported those parties voted strategically for the Liberals to prevent an Alliance victory.

=== Post-election ===
Further controversies plagued Day following the election. While he had been a government minister in Alberta he wrote a letter to the editor of the Red Deer Advocate in April 1999 in which he criticized Lorne Goddard, a lawyer and Red Deer school trustee, for defending a man accused of possessing child pornography. In it he alleged that Goddard himself supported child pornography. When Goddard sued for libel, the Alberta government covered Day's legal bills. In December, the government lawyers settled out of court, but the legal costs and settlement totalled $792,000. A citizen's fund was set up on behalf of taxpayers to cover the lawyers' charges. Even though thousands of dollars began coming in from across the country, Alberta's Ethics Commissioner ruled that the voluntary fund could not be used. Day was criticized for the costs and eventually re-paid the province $60,000, the settlement amount excluding legal fees. Further controversy ensued in February when it was reported that Bennett Jones, the law firm that had represented Day at taxpayer expense, donated $70,000 to the Canadian Alliance Fund shortly after Day settled. The Alliance launched an internal review that determined that nothing inappropriate had occurred.

In April, it was reported that Day had approved the hiring of a private investigator to dig up dirt to smear the Liberals. After confirming that he had met the man on April 7, Day denied this on the 8th, claiming on the 9th that he had read of the meeting in The Globe and Mail and had assumed that it was correct. Day later made it clear that he never did hire or approve of the hiring of an investigator.

Given the string of negative stories, many Alliance members became increasingly critical of Day's leadership. In late April, several members of Day's Shadow Cabinet, including deputy leader Deborah Grey, resigned their posts. In the following months, Grey and eleven other MPs either resigned or were suspended from caucus for criticizing Day. This group, led by Chuck Strahl and Grey, formed the "Independent Alliance Caucus" during the summer. Day offered an amnesty, but seven of them turned it down and formed the Democratic Representative Caucus, led by Strahl and Grey. The DRC entered a short-lived coalition agreement with the Tories, which was seen as an attempt by PC leader Joe Clark to reunite the Canadian right on his terms.

== Political career after leadership ==
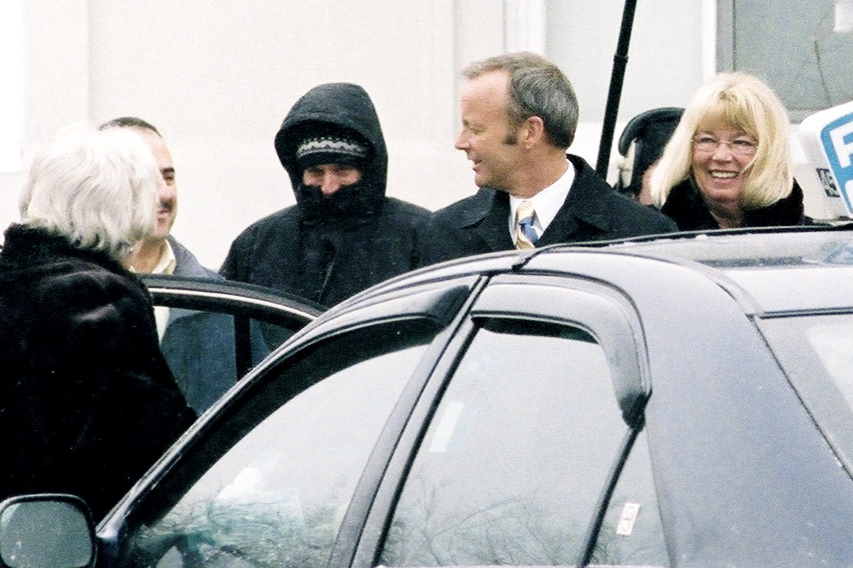
Day arrives for his swearing in at Rideau Hall on February 6, 2006.

In the fall of 2001, Day agreed to step aside and re-contest the leadership, and in the March 2002 Alliance leadership election, Day was defeated by Stephen Harper on the first ballot. As a concession to Day, Harper appointed him as foreign affairs critic. Five of the seven DRC MPs (all except Inky Mark and Jim Pankiw) rejoined the Alliance caucus on April 10.

In March 2003, Day and Harper co-wrote a letter to The Wall Street Journal in which they condemned the Canadian government's unwillingness to participate in the 2003 invasion of Iraq. Day later appeared as a speaker at a "Canadians for Bush" rally in the Niagara region, organized by controversial right-wing minister Tristan Emmanuel.

In December 2003, the Canadian Alliance and the Progressive Conservative Party merged to become the Conservative Party of Canada. Day did not run for the leadership of the new party but remained the party's foreign affairs critic. He was re-elected to Parliament in the 2004, 2006, and 2008 elections.

In November 2004, Day provoked controversy by not offering condolences to Palestinians after the death of PLO leader Yasser Arafat. The controversy was heightened when it was leaked to the media that Day had attempted to justify his actions to his party colleagues by circulating an article by David Frum that suggested that Arafat had died of AIDS.

In March 2007, the federal Liberals accused former Alliance MP Jim Hart of having accepted a payment of $50,000 to step aside in favour of Day before the 2000 byelection. Contacted at his home in the Republic of Georgia, Hart—in a brief email statement to the CBC—did not deny the allegations or impeach the authenticity of the evidence the Liberals had obtained. The entire matter was investigated by the Royal Canadian Mounted Police who found no evidence of wrongdoing.

On March 23, 2008, Stockwell Day signed the Canada-Israel 'Declaration of Intent' on 'public safety' and security cooperation between the two countries, as Minister of Public Safety and Emergency Preparedness. It was co-signed in Tel-Aviv by Israel's Minister of Public Security, Avi Dichter. Months later in May 2008, Day attended and participated in the 1st International Security Forum of Ministers of Interior and Homeland Security in Jerusalem.

In August 2010, Day caused some controversy when he stated the government was "very concerned ... about the increase in the amount of unreported crimes that surveys clearly show are happening". Critics question the supporting evidence of the minister as data pertaining to unreported crimes for 2009 had not yet been released.

On March 12, 2011, Day announced that he would not be seeking re-election in the 2011 federal election.

=== Minister of Public Safety (February 2006-October 2008) ===
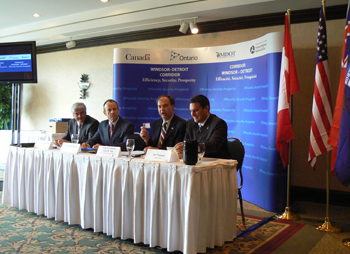
Stockwell Day at a June 2008 announcement on Border Safety.

On February 6, 2006, Day was promoted to the Minister of Public Safety in the Conservative government and was sworn into the Privy Council. When, in May 2008, Israeli Ambassador Alan Baker warned that Canada's Muslim population would influence its policies, Day responded by saying that Canada was proud of its multicultural composition.

=== Minister of International Trade (October 2008-January 2010) ===
On October 30, 2008, Day was sworn in as Minister of International Trade in the Conservative Government. He was also appointed the Minister for the Asia–Pacific Gateway and Corridor Initiative.

=== President of Treasury Board (January 2010-March 2011) ===
Day was appointed president of the Treasury Board by Stephen Harper on January 19, 2010.

During the controversy over the Harper government's decision to eliminate the mandatory long-form census, Day defended the move by implying that online web searches are as effective as the national census: "We live in an information age where any 12-year-old kid can push any button on the Internet and find out any information he or she wants without threatening a citizen that they're going to go to jail."

In March 2011, Day announced that he would not seek re-election in the next federal elections.

== Post-political career ==
After retiring from politics Day started a government relations firm, called Stockwell Day Connex. On June 14, 2011, the Asia Pacific Foundation of Canada appointed Day as a Distinguished Fellow and he remained in this role until 2016. Day also currently holds a position on the board of directors for the Canada China Business Council. He also previously sat on the boards of the Centre for Israel and Jewish Affairs and the Canada-India Business Council.

Day was a member of the board of directors of Telus Communications and a senior strategic advisor to Canadian law firm McMillan LLP from 2011 to June 2020, when he resigned from both positions after comments he made on CBC News Network's Power & Politics amidst the George Floyd protests triggered strong social media reaction including the threat of a boycott of Telus if he did not resign. In the televised debate, Day's comments included deploring the murder of George Floyd, supporting the right of people to protest and opposing the riots and destruction in US cities. Day had said that systemic racism did not exist in Canada and referenced his experience of being bullied as a child for wearing glasses, suggesting it was the same as having to endure racism. Day noted the difference between the Floyd family asking for the violence to stop with the reaction of a number of celebrities who were not condemning the violence and offering to pay the bill of arrested people. Day also said that while Canada has some "idiot racists", he felt that most Canadians are not racist. Day disagreed with Prime Minister Justin Trudeau's claim that Canada is a "systematically racist" country, while noting improvements can always be made. Day apologized the next day to those who had been hurt by any of his comments and vowed to continue the fight against racism in all its forms.

From 2021 to 2023, Day served as the interim president of the King's College, which was a small Christian liberal arts college in New York City, located in the financial district. The King's College had accepted a $2 million loan from Peter Chung, the billionaire owner of Primacorp Ventures, in April 2021. Day had previously worked as a consultant for Chung and was appointed as the college's executive as part of the deal, a move students and staff raised alarms about at the time. Additionally, Peter Chung's career is rife with investments into institutions that soon afterwards failed, notably, Wilshire Computer College in California, a case in which he refused to pay students of the institution a court-ordered $12 million in compensation. Other failed investments of Chung's include Quest University in British Columbia (which ceased operations in April 2023) and CDI College across Canada, which has been criticized for falsely advertising its accreditation status and job placement rates. In July 2025, after Day had left as president, the trustees of The King's College announced that it would close permanently.

On August 3, 2026, Day released a video on his X account saying the events taking place in Ceuta was an "Invasion". In the video, Day warned Canada about a potential invasion of Muslims into the country if the government did not make it clear that Canada is not open to everyone.

== AWZ Ventures ==
From 2015 to 2017, Day was a Director at AWZ Ventures, a Canadian private investment company which invests in Israeli cybersecurity, intelligence, and physical security technologies.

28th Canadian Ministry (2006–2015) – Cabinet of Stephen Harper
Cabinet posts (2)
Predecessor	Office	Successor
Michael Fortier	Minister of International Trade; 2008–2010	Peter Van Loan
Anne McLellan	Minister of Public Safety and Emergency Preparedness; 2006–2008 styled as Minister of Public Safety	Peter Van Loan
Special Cabinet Responsibilities
Predecessor	Title	Successor
James Moore, as SoS	Minister for the Asia–Pacific Gateway; 2008–2011	Ed Fast
Political offices
Preceded by Deborah Grey; Interim	Leader of the Canadian Alliance; 2000–2001	Succeeded by John Reynolds; Interim
Parliament of Canada
Preceded by Deborah Grey	Leader of the Opposition; 2000–2001	Succeeded by John Reynolds
Preceded by Jim Hart	Member of Parliament Okanagan—Coquihalla; 2000–2011	Succeeded by Dan Albas
Legislative Assembly of Alberta
Preceded by New District	MLA Red Deer North; 1986–2000	Succeeded by Mary Anne Jablonski
