= Halton—Wentworth =

Former federal electoral district in Ontario, Canada

Ontario electoral district

Defunct federal electoral district
- Legislature: House of Commons
- District created: 1966
- District abolished: 1976
- First contested: 1968
- Last contested: 1974

Halton—Wentworth was a federal electoral district represented in the House of Commons of Canada from 1968 to 1979. It was located in the province of Ontario. This riding was created in 1966 from parts of Halton and Wentworth ridings.

It consisted of the Town of Burlington and the Township of Nassagaweya in the County of Halton, and the Town of Burlington, the Town of Dundas and the Townships of East Flamborough and West Flamborough in the County of Wentworth.

The electoral district was abolished in 1976 when it was redistributed between Burlington, Guelph, Halton and Hamilton—Wentworth ridings.

== Members of Parliament ==
This riding has elected the following members of Parliament:

Parliament	Years	Member	Party
Riding created from Halton and Wentworth
28th	1968–1972	John B. Morison	Liberal
29th	1972–1974	Bill Kempling	Progressive Conservative
30th	1974–1979	Bill Kempling	Progressive Conservative
Riding dissolved into Burlington, Guelph, Halton and Hamilton—Wentworth

== Election results ==
1968 Canadian federal election
Party	Candidate	Votes
Liberal	John B. Morison	19,563
Progressive Conservative	James Reginald Swanborough	18,043
New Democratic	Ted MacDonald	9,312
Independent Liberal	Norman Brian Braden	399

1972 Canadian federal election
Party	Candidate	Votes
Progressive Conservative	Bill Kempling	31,150
Liberal	Norm McGuinness	21,450
New Democratic	Dickson Bailey	10,630

1974 Canadian federal election
Party	Candidate	Votes
Progressive Conservative	Bill Kempling	26,798
Liberal	Eric Cunningham	26,130
New Democratic	Walter Mulkewich	8,877

== See also ==
- List of Canadian electoral districts
- Historical federal electoral districts of Canada
