= Bill Kempling =

Canadian politician

William James Kempling (February 5, 1921 – May 20, 1996) was a Canadian politician. Born in Grimsby, Ontario, he represented the electoral districts of Halton—Wentworth in the House of Commons of Canada from 1972 to 1979, and Burlington from 1979 to 1993.

He was a member of the Progressive Conservative Party of Canada. Kempling is perhaps best known for being a veteran of World War II stationed in Burma. He was a Flight Lieutenant with the R.A.F. and his plane was shot down over the jungles of Burma while on a mission. Surviving the crash, he was subsequently taken prisoner by the Japanese Army and interned in a P.O.W. camp until he was able to escape and make his way through the jungle where he was rescued by a patrol of Ghurka Soldiers that brought him safely out of the jungle to Allied territory.

== Electoral record ==
1988 Canadian federal election: Burlington
Party	Candidate	Votes	%	±%
Progressive Conservative	Bill Kempling	26,293	52.1	-9.9
Liberal	James Smith	13,448	26.6	+7.8
New Democratic	Jane Mulkewich	8,149	16.1	-3.1
Christian Heritage	Ron Bremer	2,285	4.5	
Libertarian	Dan Riga	321	0.6	
Total valid votes		50,496	100.0	

1984 Canadian federal election: Burlington
Party	Candidate	Votes	%	±%
Progressive Conservative	Bill Kempling	37,577	61.9	+11.2
New Democratic	Walter Mulkewich	11,687	19.3	+3.6
Liberal	Fred Schwenger	11,406	18.8	-14.0
Total valid votes		60,670	100.0	

1980 Canadian federal election: Burlington
Party	Candidate	Votes	%	±%
Progressive Conservative	Bill Kempling	27,212	50.8	-5.6
Liberal	Tom Sutherland	17,574	32.8	+4.6
New Democratic	Danny Dunleavy	8,421	15.7	+1.0
Libertarian	Bruno S. Oberski	341	0.6	0.0
Marxist–Leninist	Charles Boylan	63	0.1	0.0
Total valid votes		53,611	100.0	
lop.parl.ca

1979 Canadian federal election: Burlington
Party	Candidate	Votes	%
Progressive Conservative	Bill Kempling	32,225	56.4
Liberal	Tom Sutherland	16,100	28.2
New Democratic	Danny Dunleavy	8,421	14.7
Libertarian	John Lawson	365	0.6
Marxist–Leninist	Charles Boylan	62	0.1
Total valid votes		57,173	100.0

Parliament of Canada
Preceded by John B. Morison	Member of Parliament for Halton—Wentworth; 1972-1979	Succeeded by last member, riding abolished in 1976
Preceded by first member, riding created in 1976	Member of Parliament for Burlington; 1979-1993	Succeeded by Paddy Torsney
