= Okanagan—Similkameen =

Former federal electoral district in British Columbia, Canada

British Columbia electoral district

Defunct federal electoral district
- Legislature: House of Commons
- District created: 1976
- District abolished: 1987
- First contested: 1979
- Last contested: 1984

Okanagan—Similkameen was a federal electoral district in British Columbia, Canada, that was represented in the House of Commons of Canada from 1979 to 1988. The riding was created in 1976 from parts of Fraser Valley East, Kamloops—Cariboo and Okanagan Boundary ridings.

It consisted of:

- the Regional District of Okanagan-Similkameen
- part of the Regional District of Central Okanagan lying west of the westerly boundaries of Electoral Area A and Electoral Area I
- part of the Regional District of Kootenay Boundary lying west of the westerly boundary of Electoral Area B
- part of the Thompson-Nicola Regional District lying east of the easterly boundary of Electoral Area I and south of the southerly boundaries of Electoral Area J and Electoral Area L.

== Members of Parliament ==
Parliament	Years	Member	Party
Riding created from Fraser Valley East, Kamloops—Cariboo and Okanagan Boundary
31st	1979–1980	Frederick King	Progressive Conservative
32nd	1980–1984	Frederick King	Progressive Conservative
33rd	1984–1988	Frederick King	Progressive Conservative
Riding dissolved into Okanagan Centre and Okanagan—Similkameen—Merritt

== Election results ==
1984 Canadian federal election
Party	Candidate	Votes	%	±%
Progressive Conservative	Frederick King	27,071	52.21	+7.19
New Democratic	Peter J. Merry	15,181	29.28	–1.40
Liberal	Wilson Rutherford	8,106	15.63	–6.53
Confederation of Regions	Sam Davidson	672	1.30	–
Green	Russ Domer	417	0.80	–
Social Credit	Bob Hamersley	402	0.78	–0.62
Total valid votes		51,849	99.70	
Total rejected ballots		157	0.30	+0.03
Turnout		52,006	76.97	+6.05
Eligible voters		67,570		
Progressive Conservative hold		Swing		+4.30
Source: Elections Canada

1980 Canadian federal election
Party	Candidate	Votes	%	±%
Progressive Conservative	Frederick King	19,161	45.02	–4.54
New Democratic	Darwin Sgurgeirson	13,058	30.68	+3.05
Liberal	Don Moses	9,433	22.16	–0.06
Social Credit	Bob Hamersley	593	1.39	–
Rhinoceros	André Kruger	317	0.74	–
Total valid votes		42,562	99.73	
Total rejected ballots		114	0.27	+0.00
Turnout		42,676	70.92	–4.01
Eligible voters		60,178		
Progressive Conservative hold		Swing		–3.80
Source: Elections Canada

1979 Canadian federal election
Party	Candidate	Votes	%	±%
Progressive Conservative	Frederick King	21,008	49.56	–
New Democratic	Darwin Sigurgeirson	11,715	27.63	–
Liberal	Don Moses	9,421	22.22	–
No affiliation	Alexander V. Barker	249	0.59	–
Total valid votes		42,393	99.74	
Total rejected ballots		112	0.26	–
Turnout		42,505	74.92	–
Eligible voters		56,731		
This riding was created from parts of Fraser Valley East, Kamloops—Cariboo and Okanagan Boundary, which elected two Progressive Conservatives and one Liberal (Kamloops—Cariboo) in the previous election.
Source: Elections Canada

== See also ==
- List of Canadian electoral districts
- Historical federal electoral districts of Canada
