= Minister of International Development (Canada) =

Secretary of State (International Development)
- Incumbent; Randeep Sarai since May 13, 2025
- Global Affairs Canada
- Style: The Honourable
- Member of: House of Commons; Privy Council; Cabinet
- Reports to: Parliament; Prime Minister
- Appointer: Monarch (represented by the governor general) on the advice of the prime minister
- Term length: At His Majesty's pleasure
- Inaugural holder: Pierre Pettigrew
- Formation: January 25, 1996
- Salary: CA$299,900 (2024)
- Website: www.international.gc.ca

The minister of international development (French: Ministre du Développement international) is a minister of the Crown in the Canadian Cabinet. The minister has responsibility for the international development portfolio for Global Affairs Canada.

Between 1995 and 2015 the post was known as the Minister for International Cooperation. The position was reduced to a secretary of state position in the 30th Canadian Ministry, titled as Secretary of State (International Development).

== Previous post ==
Prior to its current title, the post was held as Minister of State (External Relations) from 1982 until 1983, Minister for External Relations between 1983 and 1995, and as the Minister for International Cooperation from 1995 until 2015.

== List of ministers ==
Key:

Liberal Party of Canada
Conservative Party of Canada

No.	Portrait	Name	Term of office		Political party	Ministry
Minister for International Cooperation
1		Pierre Pettigrew	January 25, 1996	October 3, 1996	Liberal	26 (Chrétien)
2		Don Boudria	October 3, 1996	June 10, 1997	Liberal	26 (Chrétien)
3		Diane Marleau	June 11, 1997	August 2, 1999	Liberal	26 (Chrétien)
4		Maria Minna	August 3, 1999	January 13, 2002	Liberal	26 (Chrétien)
5		Susan Whelan	January 14, 2002	December 11, 2003	Liberal	26 (Chrétien)
6		Aileen Carroll	December 12, 2003	February 5, 2006	Liberal	27 (Martin)
7		Josée Verner	February 6, 2006	August 14, 2007	Conservative	28 (Harper)
8		Bev Oda	August 14, 2007	July 4, 2012	Conservative	28 (Harper)
9		Julian Fantino	July 4, 2012	July 15, 2013	Conservative	28 (Harper)
10		Christian Paradis	July 15, 2013	November 4, 2015	Conservative	28 (Harper)
Minister of International Development and La Francophonie
11		Marie-Claude Bibeau	November 4, 2015	July 18, 2018	Liberal	29 (J. Trudeau)
Minister of International Development
11		Marie-Claude Bibeau	July 18, 2018	March 1, 2019	Liberal	29 (J. Trudeau)
12		Maryam Monsef	March 1, 2019	November 20, 2019	Liberal	29 (J. Trudeau)
13		Karina Gould	November 20, 2019	October 26, 2021	Liberal	29 (J. Trudeau)
14		Harjit Sajjan	October 26, 2021	July 26, 2023	Liberal	29 (J. Trudeau)
15		Ahmed Hussen	July 26, 2023	March 14, 2025	Liberal	29 (J. Trudeau)
Minister of Foreign Affairs and International Development
16		Mélanie Joly	March 14, 2025	May 13, 2025	Liberal	30 (Carney)
Secretary of State (International Development)
17		Randeep Sarai	May 13, 2025	Incumbent	Liberal	30 (Carney)
