= Jack Whittaker (politician) =

Canadian politician

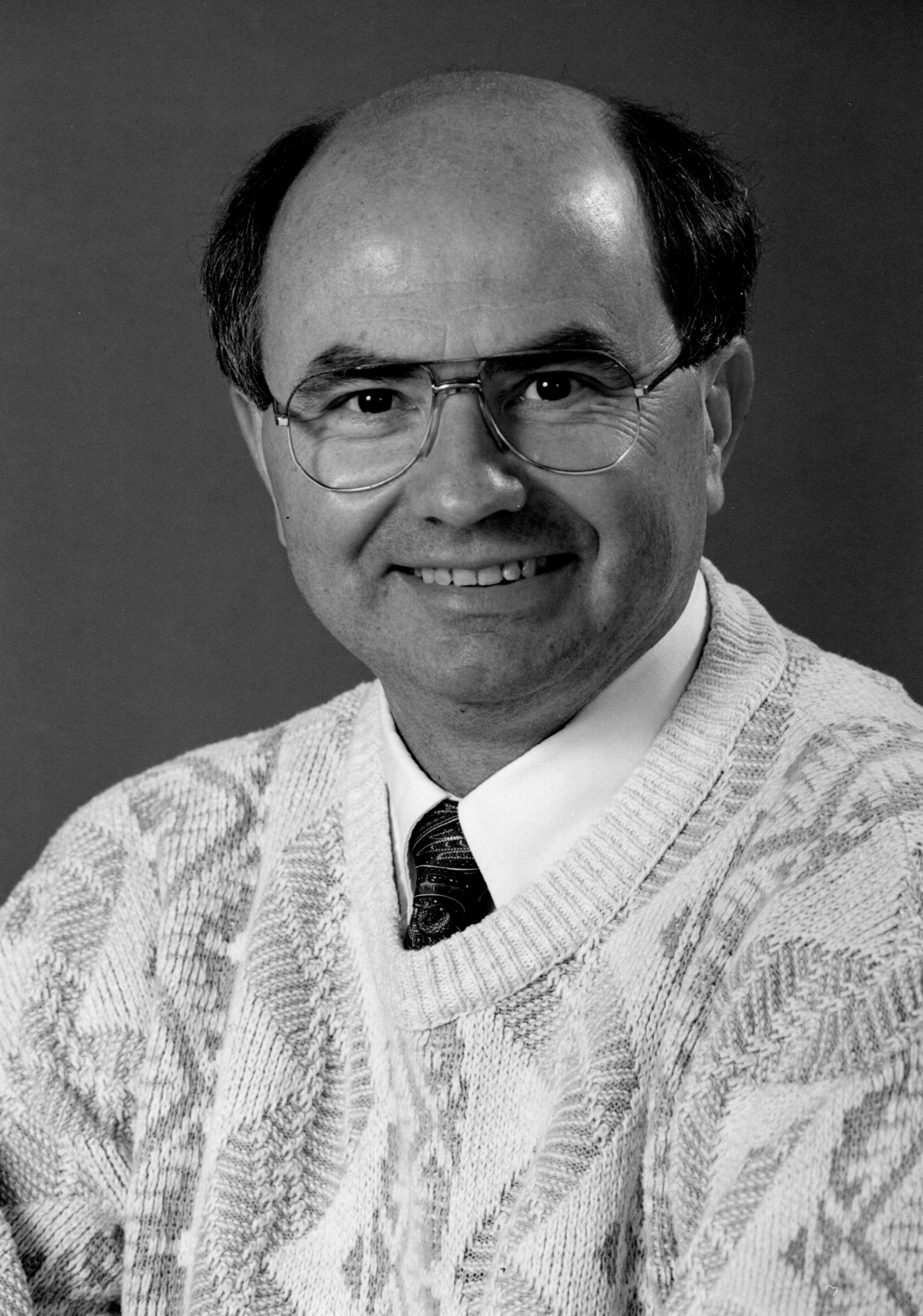

John R. Whittaker (born November 13, 1944) was a Canadian Member of Parliament for the Okanagan—Similkameen—Merritt riding in British Columbia from 1988–1993 for the New Democratic Party.
