= List of Ontario senators =

This is a list of past and present members of the Senate of Canada representing the province of Ontario. Ontario has had an allocation of 24 senators since the time of Confederation. The province is also one of four regional Senate divisions under Section 26 of the Constitution Act that allows for the expansion of the Senate by one or two senators per region.

== Current senators ==
Name	Senate political affiliation	Province (Division) (Note: Senators are appointed to represent Ontario. Each senator may choose to designate a geographic area within Ontario as his or her division.)	Date appointed	Appointed on the advice of (Note: Senators are appointed by the Governor-General of Canada in the Queen's or King's name on the recommendation of the prime minister.)	Retirement date
Salma Ataullahjan	Conservative	Ontario	July 9, 2010	Harper	April 29, 2027
Robert Black	Canadian Senators Group	Ontario	February 15, 2018	Trudeau, J.	March 27, 2037
Peter M. Boehm	Independent Senators Group	Ontario	October 3, 2018	Trudeau, J.	April 26, 2029
Yvonne Boyer	Independent Senators Group	Ottawa	March 15, 2018	Trudeau, J.	October 25, 2028
Sharon Burey	Canadian Senators Group	Ontario	November 21, 2022	Trudeau, J.	December 4, 2032
Andrew Cardozo	Progressive Senate Group	Ontario	November 21, 2022	Trudeau, J.	March 21, 2031
Bernadette Clement	Independent Senators Group	Ontario	June 22, 2021	Trudeau, J.	May 17, 2040
Donna Dasko	Independent Senators Group	Ontario	June 6, 2018	Trudeau, J.	August 19, 2026
Marty Deacon	Independent Senators Group	Ontario	February 15, 2018	Trudeau, J.	April 23, 2033
Tony Dean	Independent Senators Group	Ontario	November 10, 2016	Trudeau, J.	August 26, 2028
Peter Harder	Progressive Senate Group	Ottawa	March 23, 2016	Trudeau, J.	August 25, 2027
Katherine Hay	Progressive Senate Group		March 7, 2025	Trudeau, J.	January 16, 2036
Farah Mohamed	Independent Senators Group		March 7, 2025	Trudeau, J.	July 5, 2045
Lucie Moncion	Independent Senators Group	Ontario	November 10, 2016	Trudeau, J.	October 25, 2033
Marnie McBean	Independent Senators Group	Ontario	December 20, 2023	Trudeau, J.	January 28, 2043
Rosemary Moodie	Independent Senators Group	Ontario	December 12, 2018	Trudeau, J.	November 24, 2031
Ratna Omidvar	Independent Senators Group	Ontario	April 1, 2016	Trudeau, J.	November 5, 2024
Kim Pate	Independent Senators Group	Ontario	November 10, 2016	Trudeau, J.	November 10, 2034
Rebecca Patterson	Canadian Senators Group	Ontario	November 21, 2022	Trudeau, J.	June 15, 2040
Sandra Pupatello	Non-affiliated	Ontario	March 7, 2025	Trudeau, J.	October 6, 2037
Paulette Senior	Non-affiliated	Ontario	December 20, 2023	Trudeau, J.	December 4, 2036
Toni Varone	Independent Senators Group	Ontario	December 20, 2023	Trudeau, J.	June 20, 2033
Hassan Yussuff	Independent Senators Group	Ontario	June 22, 2021	Trudeau, J.	December 15, 2032
Mohammad Al Zaibak	Independent Senators Group	Ontario	January 28, 2024	Trudeau, J.	August 9, 2026

== Historical ==
Name	Party	Division	Date appointed	Appointed on the advice of	End of term
James Cox Aikins	Liberal-Conservative	Ontario	October 23, 1867	Royal Proclamation (Note: The initial 24 senators were named by a Royal Proclamation at the time of confederation.)	May 30, 1882
James Cox Aikins	Liberal-Conservative	Ontario	January 7, 1896	Bowell	August 6, 1904
John Black Aird	Liberal	Toronto	November 10, 1964	Pearson	November 28, 1974
George Alexander	Conservative	Woodstock	May 30, 1873	MacDonald	May 29, 1891
George Allan	Liberal-Conservative	York	October 23, 1867	Royal Proclamation	July 24, 1901
James Arthurs	Conservative	Ontario	July 20, 1935	Bennett	October 7, 1937
Norman Atkins	Progressive Conservative	Markham	July 2, 1986	Mulroney	June 27, 2009
Allen Bristol Aylesworth	Liberal	North York	January 11, 1923	King	February 13, 1952
Robert Beith	Liberal	Bowmanville	January 15, 1907	Laurier	January 26, 1922
Napoléon Belcourt	Liberal	Ottawa	November 22, 1907	Laurier	August 7, 1932
Rhéal Bélisle	Progressive Conservative	Sudbury	February 4, 1963	Diefenbaker	November 3, 1992
John Joseph Bench	Liberal	Lincoln	November 19, 1942	King	December 9, 1947
William Moore Benidickson	Liberal	Kenora-Rainy River	July 7, 1965	Pearson	April 1, 1985
William Bennett	Conservative	Simcoe East	November 13, 1917	Borden	March 15, 1925
James Rea Benson	Liberal-Conservative	St. Catharines	March 14, 1868	Macdonald	March 18, 1885
Lynn Beyak	Conservative	Ontario	January 25, 2013	Harper	January 25, 2021
Florence Bird	Liberal	Carleton	March 23, 1978	Trudeau, P.E.	January 15, 1983
Charles Lawrence Bishop	Liberal	Ottawa	April 18, 1945	King	September 23, 1966
Richard Blain	Conservative	Peel	July 26, 1917	Borden	November 27, 1926
Adam Fergusson Blair	Liberal	Ontario	October 23, 1867	Royal Proclamation	December 29, 1867
Oliver Blake	Liberal	Ontario	October 23, 1867	Royal Proclamation	December 10, 1873
Gwen Boniface	Independent Senators Group	Ontario	November 10, 2016	Trudeau, J.	November 15, 2025
Peter Bosa	Liberal	York-Caboto	April 5, 1977	Trudeau, P. E.	December 10, 1998
Mackenzie Bowell	Conservative	Hastings	December 5, 1892	Thompson	December 10, 1917
Joseph-Arthur Bradette	Liberal	Cochrane	June 12, 1953	St. Laurent	September 12, 1961
David Braley	Conservative	Ontario	May 20, 2010	Harper	November 30, 2013
William Henry Brouse	Independent Reformer	Prescott	August 9, 1878	Mackenzie	August 23, 1881
George Brown	Liberal	Lambton	December 16, 1873	Mackenzie	May 9, 1880
William Brunt	Progressive Conservative	Hanover	October 12, 1957	Diefenbaker	July 7, 1962
Harcourt Burland Bull	Conservative	Hamilton	February 24, 1879	Macdonald	August 12, 1881
Asa Allworth Burnham	Conservative	Ontario	October 23, 1867	Royal Proclamation	May 10, 1873
Alexander Campbell	Conservative	Cataraqui	October 23, 1867	Royal Proclamation	February 7, 1887
Archibald Campbell	Liberal	Toronto West	November 22, 1907	Laurier	January 15, 1913
Gordon Peter Campbell	Liberal	Toronto	February 19, 1943	King	January 16, 1964
John Carling	Liberal-Conservative	London	April 27, 1891; April 23, 1896	Macdonald; Bowell	February 17, 1892; November 6, 1911
Richard John Cartwright	Liberal	Oxford	September 20, 1904	Laurier	September 24, 1912
Charles Eusèbe Casgrain	Conservative	Windsor	January 12, 1887	Macdonald	March 8, 1907
Marie Charette-Poulin	Liberal	Northern Ontario	September 22, 1995	Chrétien	April 17, 2015
Lionel Choquette	Progressive Conservative	Ottawa East	January 31, 1958	Diefenbaker	March 6, 1981
David Christie	Liberal	Erie	October 23, 1867	Royal Proclamation	December 15, 1880
Francis Clemow	Conservative	Rideau	February 3, 1885	Macdonald	May 28, 1902
Thomas Coffey	Liberal	London	March 12, 1903	Laurier	June 8, 1914
John Joseph Connolly	Liberal	Ottawa West	June 12, 1953	St. Laurent	October 31, 1981
Anne Cools	Independent Senators Group	Toronto Centre; Toronto Centre-York (Note: Division designated as Toronto Centre from January 13, 1984 to February 14, 2001 and Toronto Centre-York from February 15, 2001 to 2018.)	January 13, 1984	Trudeau, P. E.	August 12, 2018
Henry Corby	Conservative	Belleville	October 17, 1912	Borden	April 23, 1917
Louis Côté	Conservative	Ottawa East	December 30, 1933	Bennett	February 2, 1943
George Albertus Cox	Liberal	Saugeen	November 13, 1896	Laurier	January 16, 1914
George Crawford	Conservative	Ontario	October 23, 1867	Royal Proclamation	July 4, 1870
David Croll	Liberal	Toronto-Spadina	July 28, 1955	St. Laurent	June 11, 1991
Thomas Wilson Crothers	Conservative	Ontario	October 3, 1921	Meighen	December 10, 1921
Keith Davey	Liberal	York	February 24, 1966	Pearson	July 1, 1996
Rupert Davies	Liberal	Kingston	November 19, 1942	King	March 11, 1967
Robert de Cotret	Progressive Conservative	Ottawa	June 5, 1979	Clark	January 14, 1980
Daniel Derbyshire	Liberal	Brockville	November 22, 1907	Laurier	June 18, 1916
Jean Noël Desmarais	Progressive Conservative	Sudbury	June 4, 1993	Mulroney	July 25, 1995
Walter Hamilton Dickson	Conservative	Niagara	October 23, 1867	Royal Proclamation	February 19, 1884
Consiglio Di Nino	Conservative	Ontario	August 30, 1990	Mulroney	June 30, 2012
John Dobson	Conservative	Lindsay	February 23, 1892	Abbott	January 27, 1907
James J. Donnelly	Conservative	South Bruce	May 26, 1913	Borden	October 20, 1948
Richard Doyle	Progressive Conservative	North York	March 19, 1985	Mulroney	March 10, 1998
Joseph James Duffus	Liberal	Peterborough West	February 15, 1940	King	February 7, 1957
Nicole Eaton	Conservative	Ontario	January 2, 2009	Harper	January 21, 2020
William Cameron Edwards	Liberal	Russell	March 17, 1903	Laurier	September 17, 1921
Art Eggleton	Liberal	Ontario	March 24, 2005	Martin	September 29, 2018
John Elliott	Liberal	Middlesex	January 29, 1940	King	December 20, 1941
Tobias Enverga	Conservative	Ontario	September 6, 2012	Harper	November 16, 2017
William Daum Euler	Liberal	Waterloo	May 11, 1940	King	July 15, 1961
Trevor Eyton	Conservative	Ontario	September 23, 1990	Mulroney	July 12, 2009
Iva Campbell Fallis	Conservative	Peterborough	July 20, 1935	Bennett	March 7, 1956
Thomas Farquhar	Liberal	Algoma	September 10, 1948	King	September 27, 1962
John Ferguson	Conservative	Ontario	October 1, 1892	Abbott	September 22, 1896
Doug Finley	Conservative	Ontario-South Coast	August 27, 2009	Harper	May 11, 2013
Isobel Finnerty	Liberal	Ontario	September 2, 1999	Chrétien	July 15, 2005
John Henry Fisher	Conservative	Ontario	July 26, 1917	Borden	December 1, 1933
Billa Flint	Liberal	Trent	October 23, 1867	Royal Proclamation	June 14, 1894
Gordon Fogo	Liberal	Carleton	January 25, 1949	St. Laurent	July 6, 1952
Josée Forest-Niesing	Independent Senators Group	Ontario	October 11, 2018	Trudeau, J.	November 20, 2021
Eugene Forsey	Liberal	Nepean	September 7, 1970	Trudeau, P. E.	May 29, 1979
George Foster	Conservative	Toronto	September 22, 1921	Meighen	December 30, 1931
William Fraser	Liberal	Trenton	June 25, 1949	St. Laurent	October 26, 1962
Alfred Ernest Fripp	Conservative	Toronto	December 30, 1933	Bennett	March 25, 1938
Royce Frith	Liberal	Glen Tay	April 5, 1977	Trudeau, P. E.	August 29, 1994
Francis Theodore Frost	Liberal	Leeds and Grenville	March 12, 1903	Laurier	August 26, 1908
Linda Frum	Conservative	Ontario	August 27, 2009	Harper	August 21, 2021
George Taylor Fulford	Liberal	Brockville	January 29, 1900	Laurier	October 15, 1905
Jean-Robert Gauthier	Liberal	Ontario (1994.11.23-2001.12.03); Ottawa-Vanier (2001.12.04-2004.10.22)	November 23, 1994	Chrétien	October 22, 2004
Irving Gerstein	Conservative	Ontario	January 2, 2009	Harper	February 10, 2016
Thomas Nicholson Gibbs	Liberal-Conservative	Newmarket	April 3, 1880	Macdonald	April 7, 1883
William Gibson	Liberal	Lincoln	February 11, 1902	Laurier	May 4, 1914
Robert Gladstone	Liberal	Wellington South	September 7, 1949	St. Laurent	June 1, 1951
John Morrow Godfrey	Liberal	Rosedale	October 5, 1973	Trudeau, P. E.	June 28, 1987
William Henry Golding	Liberal	Huron-Perth	June 25, 1949	St. Laurent	December 31, 1961
George Gordon	Conservative	Nipissing	October 17, 1912	Borden	February 3, 1942
James Robert Gowan	Liberal-Conservative	Barrie	January 29, 1885	Macdonald	February 1, 1907
Jerry Grafstein	Liberal	Metro Toronto	January 13, 1984	Trudeau, P. E.	January 2, 2010
George Perry Graham	Liberal	Eganville	December 20, 1926	King	January 1, 1943
John James Greene	Liberal	Niagara	September 1, 1972	Trudeau, P. E.	October 23, 1978
Allister Grosart	Progressive Conservative	Pickering	September 24, 1962	Diefenbaker	December 13, 1981
Stanley Haidasz	Liberal	Toronto-Parkdale	March 23, 1978	Trudeau, P. E.	March 4, 1998
John Hamilton	Conservative	Kingston	October 23, 1867	Royal Proclamation	October 10, 1882
Mac Harb	Liberal/Independent	Ontario	September 9, 2003	Chrétien	August 26, 2013
Arthur Charles Hardy	Liberal	Leeds	February 10, 1922	King	March 13, 1962
Salter Hayden	Liberal	Toronto	February 9, 1940	King	November 1, 1983
Andrew Haydon	Liberal	Ottawa	March 10, 1924	King	November 10, 1932
Horatio Clarence Hocken	Conservative	Toronto	December 30, 1933	Bennett	February 18, 1937
Adam Hope	Liberal	Hamilton	January 3, 1877	MacKenzie	August 7, 1882
Henry Herbert Horsey	Liberal	Prince Edward	December 14, 1928	King	January 6, 1942
Raoul Hurtubise	Liberal	Nipissing	June 9, 1945	King	January 31, 1955
Robert Jaffray	Liberal	Toronto	March 8, 1906	Laurier	December 16, 1914
Lyman Melvin Jones	Liberal	Toronto	January 21, 1901	Laurier	April 15, 1917
James Kelleher	Conservative	Ontario	September 23, 1990	Mulroney	October 2, 2005
William McDonough Kelly	Progressive Conservative	Port Severn	December 23, 1982	Trudeau, P. E.	July 21, 2000
Albert Edward Kemp	Conservative	Toronto	November 4, 1921	Meighen	August 12, 1929
Betty Kennedy	Liberal	Ontario	June 20, 2000	Chrétien	January 4, 2001
Colin Kenny	Liberal	Rideau	June 29, 1984	Trudeau, P. E.	February 2, 2018
Wilbert Keon	Conservative	Ottawa	September 27, 1990	Mulroney	May 17, 2010
James Kirkpatrick Kerr	Liberal	Toronto	March 12, 1903	Laurier	December 4, 1916
William Kerr	Liberal	Northumberland	March 15, 1899	Laurier	November 22, 1906
Mary Elizabeth Kinnear	Liberal	Welland	April 6, 1967	Pearson	April 3, 1973
Vim Kochhar	Conservative	Ontario	January 29, 2010	Harper	September 21, 2011
Joseph-Henri-Gustave Lacasse	Liberal	Essex	January 10, 1928	King	January 18, 1953
John Keith McBroom Laird	Liberal	Windsor	April 6, 1967	Pearson	January 12, 1982
Frances Lankin	Independent Senators Group	Ontario	March 18, 2016	Trudeau, J.	October 21, 2024
Norman Platt Lambert	Liberal	Ottawa	January 20, 1938	King	November 4, 1965
George Landerkin	Liberal	Grey	February 16, 1901	Laurier	October 10, 1903
Daniel Lang	Liberal	South York	February 14, 1964	Pearson	June 13, 1994
Laurier LaPierre	Liberal	Ontario	June 13, 2001	Chrétien	November 21, 2004
Marjory LeBreton	Conservative	Ontario	June 18, 1993	Mulroney	July 4, 2015
Elijah Leonard	Liberal	London	October 23, 1867	Royal Proclamation	May 14, 1891
Thomas D'Arcy Leonard	Liberal	Toronto-Rosedale	July 28, 1955	St. Laurent	April 29, 1970
John Lewis	Liberal	East Toronto	September 5, 1925	King	May 18, 1935
Edgar Sydney Little	Liberal	London	January 10, 1928	King	December 22, 1943
George Lynch-Staunton	Conservative	Hamilton	January 20, 1917	Borden	March 19, 1940
John Macdonald	Independent Liberal	Ontario	November 9, 1887	Macdonald	February 4, 1890
William Ross Macdonald	Liberal	Brantford	June 12, 1953	St. Laurent	December 22, 1967
Angus Claude Macdonell	Conservative	Toronto South	August 1, 1917	Borden	January 1, 1921
Archibald Hayes Macdonell	Conservative	Toronto South	November 7, 1921	Meighen	November 12, 1939
Donald MacInnes	Liberal-Conservative	Burlington	December 24, 1881	Macdonald	December 2, 1900
David Lewis Macpherson	Conservative	Saugeen	October 23, 1867	Royal Proclamation	August 16, 1896
Duncan Kenneth MacTavish	Liberal	Ontario	June 11, 1963	Pearson	November 15, 1963
Frank Mahovlich	Liberal	Toronto	June 11, 1998	Chrétien	January 10, 2013
Marian Maloney	Liberal	Surprise Lake	June 11, 1998	Chrétien	August 16, 1999
Lorna Marsden	Liberal	Toronto-Taddle Creek	January 24, 1984	Trudeau, P. E.	August 31, 1992
Sabi Marwah	Independent Senators Group	Ontario	November 10, 2016	Trudeau, J.	September 7, 2023
Duncan Marshall	Liberal	Peel	January 20, 1938	King	January 16, 1946
Paul Martin Sr.	Liberal	Windsor-Walkerville	April 20, 1968	Trudeau, P. E.	October 30, 1974
James Mason	Conservative	Toronto	May 26, 1913	Borden	July 16, 1918
Roderick Matheson	Conservative	Ontario	October 23, 1867	Royal Proclamation	January 13, 1873
Alexander McCall	Conservative	Simcoe	May 26, 1913	Borden	June 10, 1925
Lachlin McCallum	Liberal-Conservative	Monck	February 4, 1887	Macdonald	January 13, 1903
Archibald McCoig	Liberal	Kent	January 4, 1922	King	November 21, 1927
Walter McCrea	Liberal	Ontario	October 23, 1867	Royal Proclamation	January 5, 1871
Malcolm Wallace McCutcheon	Progressive Conservative	Gormley	August 9, 1962	Diefenbaker	May 13, 1968
Donald McDonald	Liberal	Ontario	October 23, 1867	Royal Proclamation	January 20, 1879
William Henry McGuire	Liberal	East York	December 20, 1926	King	October 31, 1957
George McHugh	Liberal	Victoria	January 21, 1901	Laurier	November 28, 1926
George McIlraith	Liberal	Ottawa Valley	April 27, 1972	Trudeau, P. E.	July 29, 1983
George Crawford McKindsey	Conservative	Milton	January 11, 1884	Macdonald	February 12, 1901
Peter McLaren	Conservative	Perth	February 21, 1890	Macdonald	May 23, 1919
William McMaster	Liberal	Midland	October 23, 1867	Royal Proclamation	September 22, 1887
Donald McMillan	Conservative	Alexandria	January 11, 1884	Macdonald	July 26, 1914
James McMullen	Liberal	North Wellington	February 11, 1902	Laurier	March 18, 1913
Arthur Meighen	Conservative	St. Mary's	March 3, 1932	Bennett	January 16, 1942
Michael Meighen	Conservative	St. Mary's	September 27, 1990	Mulroney	February 6, 2012
Don Meredith	Conservative	Ontario	December 20, 2010	Harper	May 10, 2017
Samuel Merner	Conservative	Hamburg	January 12, 1887	Macdonald	August 11, 1908
David Mills	Liberal	Bothwell	November 13, 1896	Laurier	February 7, 1902
Samuel Mills	Conservative	Ontario	October 23, 1867	Royal Proclamation	January 24, 1874
John Milne	Conservative	Hamilton	December 3, 1915	Borden	March 4, 1922
Lorna Milne	Liberal	Brampton (1995.09.22-1999.11.01); Peel County (1999.11.02-2009.12.13)	September 22, 1995	Chrétien	December 13, 2009
Oliver Mowat	Liberal	Ontario	July 15, 1896	Laurier	November 18, 1897
Robert Alexander Mulholland	Conservative	Port Hope	March 12, 1918	Borden	October 1, 1927
Jim Munson	Liberal	Ottawa	December 10, 2003	Chrétien	July 14, 2021
James Murdock	Liberal	Parkdale	March 20, 1930	King	May 15, 1949
Charles Murphy	Liberal	Russell	September 5, 1925	King	November 24, 1935
Lowell Murray	Progressive Conservative	Pakenham	September 13, 1979	Clark	September 26, 2011
Nancy Ruth	Conservative	Cluny	March 24, 2005	Martin	January 6, 2017
Joan Neiman	Liberal	Peel	September 1, 1972	Trudeau, P. E.	September 9, 1995
Frederic Thomas Nicholls	Conservative	Toronto	January 20, 1917	Borden	October 25, 1921
Joseph Northwood	Liberal-Conservative	Lambton	May 19, 1880	Macdonald	October 29, 1886
Michael John O'Brien	Liberal	Renfrew	September 1, 1918	Borden	September 1, 1925
Frank Patrick O'Connor	Liberal	Scarborough Junction	December 6, 1935	King	August 21, 1939
John O'Donohoe	Liberal-Conservative	Erie	May 21, 1882	Macdonald	December 7, 1902
Thanh Hai Ngo	Conservative	Ontario	September 6, 2012	Harper	January 3, 2022
Victor Oh	Conservative	Ontario	January 25, 2013	Harper	June 10, 2024
Grattan O'Leary	Progressive Conservative	Carleton	September 24, 1962	Diefenbaker	April 7, 1976
Frederick Forsyth Pardee	Liberal	Lambton	March 11, 1922	King	February 4, 1927
Norman McLeod Paterson	Liberal	Milton	February 9, 1940	King	June 18, 1981
Landon Pearson	Liberal	Ontario	September 15, 1994	Chrétien	November 16, 2005
Ebenezer Perry	Conservative	Ontario	February 2, 1871	Macdonald	May 1, 1876
Michael Pitfield	Independent	Ottawa-Vanier	December 22, 1982	Trudeau, P. E.	June 1, 2010
Josiah Burr Plumb	Conservative	Ontario	February 8, 1883	Macdonald	March 12, 1888
Vivienne Poy	Liberal	Toronto	September 17, 1998	Chrétien	September 17, 2012
Clive Pringle	Conservative	Cobourg	January 8, 1917	Borden	May 2, 1920
William Proudfoot	Liberal	Huron	November 6, 1919	Borden	December 3, 1922
James Palmer Rankin	Liberal	Perth North	September 9, 1925	King	June 15, 1934
Valentine Ratz	Liberal	Parkhill	January 18, 1909	Laurier	March 1, 1924
Robert Read	Conservative	Quinté	February 24, 1871	Macdonald	June 29, 1896
David Reesor	Liberal	King's	October 23, 1867	Royal Proclamation	January 1, 1901
John Dowsley Reid	Conservative	Grenville	September 22, 1921	Meighen	August 26, 1929
Henry Westman Richardson	Conservative	Kingston	January 20, 1917	Borden	October 27, 1918
Gideon Robertson	Conservative	Welland	January 20, 1917	Borden	August 5, 1933
John Alexander Robertson	Progressive Conservative	Kenora-Rainy River	November 29, 1962	Diefenbaker	February 19, 1965
Arthur Roebuck	Liberal	Toronto-Trinity	April 18, 1945	King	November 17, 1971
George William Ross	Liberal	Middlesex	January 15, 1907	Laurier	March 7, 1914
John Ross	Conservative	Ontario	October 23, 1867	Royal Proclamation	January 31, 1871
Bob Runciman	Conservative	Thousand Islands and Rideau Lakes	January 29, 2010	Harper	August 10, 2017
William Eli Sanford	Conservative	Hamilton	February 8, 1887	Macdonald	July 10, 1899
Richard William Scott	Liberal	Ottawa	March 13, 1874	Mackenzie	April 23, 1913
Hugh Segal	Conservative	Kingston-Frontenac-Leeds	August 2, 2005	Martin	June 15, 2014
Asha Seth	Conservative	Ontario	January 6, 2012	Harper	December 15, 2014
Benjamin Seymour	Conservative	Newcastle	October 23, 1867	Royal Proclamation	March 23, 1880
James Shaw	Conservative	Ontario	October 23, 1867	Royal Proclamation	February 6, 1878
Ian Shugart	Independent	Ontario	September 26, 2022	Trudeau, J.	October 25, 2023
John Simpson	Liberal	Bowmanville	October 23, 1867	Royal Proclamation	March 23, 1885
Ian David Sinclair	Liberal	Halton	December 23, 1983	Trudeau, P. E.	September 27, 1988
James Skead	Conservative	Rideau	October 23, 1867; December 23, 1881	Royal Proclamation; Macdonald	January 20, 1881; July 5, 1884
David Smith	Liberal	Cobourg	June 25, 2002	Chrétien	May 16, 2016
Ernest D'Israeli Smith	Conservative	Wentworth	May 26, 1913	Borden	January 10, 1946
Frank Smith	Conservative	Toronto	February 2, 1871	Macdonald	January 1, 1900
James Houston Spence	Liberal	North Bruce	January 10, 1928	King	February 21, 1939
Thomas Simpson Sproule	Conservative	Grey	December 3, 1915	Borden	November 10, 1917
Richard Stanbury	Liberal	York Centre	February 13, 1968	Pearson	May 2, 1998
Peter Stollery	Liberal	Bloor & Yonge	July 2, 1981	Trudeau, P. E.	November 29, 2010
Joseph Albert Sullivan	Progressive Conservative	North York	October 12, 1957	Diefenbaker	February 18, 1985
Michael Sullivan	Conservative	Kingston	January 29, 1885	Macdonald	November 29, 1912
Donald Sutherland	Conservative	Oxford	July 20, 1935	Bennett	January 1, 1949
George Taylor	Conservative	Leeds	November 14, 1911	Borden	March 26, 1919
William Horace Taylor	Liberal	Norfolk	April 18, 1945	King	June 1, 1966
Andy Thompson	Liberal	Dovercourt	April 6, 1967	Pearson	March 23, 1998
James Tunney	Liberal	Grafton	March 8, 2001	Chrétien	June 16, 2002
Charles Turner	Liberal	London	July 9, 1984	Turner	March 24, 1991
James Turner	Liberal-Conservative	Ontario	January 11, 1884	Macdonald	October 10, 1889
Alexander Vidal	Conservative	Sarnia	January 15, 1873	Macdonald	November 18, 1906
David James Walker	Progressive Conservative	Toronto	February 4, 1963	Diefenbaker	September 30, 1989
John Webster	Conservative	Brockville	March 12, 1918	Borden	December 1, 1928
Eugene Whelan	Liberal	South Western Ontario	August 9, 1996	Chrétien	July 11, 1999
Howard Wetston	Independent Senators Group	Ontario	November 10, 2016	Trudeau, J.	June 3, 2022
George Stanley White	Progressive Conservative	Hastings-Frontenac	September 20, 1957	Diefenbaker	November 17, 1972
Gerald Verner White	Conservative	Pembroke	November 6, 1919	Borden	October 24, 1948
Vernon White	Canadian Senators Group	Ontario	February 20, 2012	Harper	February 21, 2034
Harry Albert Willis	Progressive Conservative	Peel	June 15, 1962	Diefenbaker	March 23, 1972
Cairine Wilson	Liberal	Rockcliffe	February 15, 1930	King	March 3, 1962
John Henry Wilson	Liberal	St. Thomas	March 8, 1904	Laurier	July 3, 1912
Lois Miriam Wilson	Independent	Toronto	June 11, 1998	Chrétien	April 8, 2002
Andrew Trew Wood	Liberal	Hamilton	January 21, 1901	Laurier	January 21, 1903
Allan Lee Woodrow	Liberal	Toronto Centre	May 19, 1953	St. Laurent	March 3, 1966

== See also ==
- Lists of Canadian senators
