= List of members of the Parliament of Canada who died in office (1867–1899) =

Canadian parliament members who died in office

The following is a list of members of the Canadian Parliament who died while they were serving their terms from Confederation in 1867 until 1899

== Senate ==
Member	Party	Province/Division	Date of death	Age at death (years)	Cause
Adam Johnston Fergusson Blair	Liberal	Ontario (Ontario)	December 29, 1867	52	
Benjamin Wier	Liberal	Nova Scotia (Nova Scotia)	April 14, 1868	62	
George Crawford	Conservative	Ontario (Ontario)	July 4, 1870	66-67	
John Hawkins Anderson	Liberal	Nova Scotia (Nova Scotia)	December 24, 1870	64-65	
John Ross	Conservative	Ontario (Ontario)	January 31, 1871	52	
Elzéar-Henri Juchereau Duchesnay	Conservative	Quebec (Lauzon)	May 12, 1871	61	
Caleb Rand Bill	Conservative	Nova Scotia (Nova Scotia)	February 1, 1872	66	
Roderick Matheson	Conservative	Ontario (Ontario)	January 13, 1873	79-80	Stroke
Asa Allworth Burnham	Conservative	Ontario (Ontario)	May 10, 1873	65	
James Leslie	Conservative	Quebec (Alma)	December 6, 1873	87	
William Steeves	Liberal	New Brunswick (New Brunswick)	December 9, 1873	59	
Oliver Blake	Liberal	Ontario (Ontario)	December 10, 1873	71	
John Locke	Liberal	Nova Scotia (Nova Scotia)	December 12, 1873	48	
Samuel Sylvester Mills	Conservative	Ontario (Ontario)	January 14, 1874	67	
Ezra Churchill	Conservative	Nova Scotia (Nova Scotia)	May 8, 1874	67	
Robert Leonard Hazen	Conservative	New Brunswick (New Brunswick)	August 15, 1874	65	
Charles-Christophe Malhiot	Liberal	Quebec (De la Vallière)	November 9, 1874	66	
Ebenezer Perry	Conservative	Ontario (Ontario)	May 1, 1876	83	
John Holmes	Conservative	Nova Scotia (Nova Scotia)	June 3, 1876	87	
John Robertson	Liberal	New Brunswick (New Brunswick)	August 3, 1876	76-77	
Charles Wilson	Conservative	Quebec (Rigaud)	May 4, 1877	69	
James Shaw	Conservative	Ontario (Ontario)	February 6, 1878	79-80	
Louis Lacoste	Conservative	Quebec (Montarville)	November 26, 1878	80	
Donald McDonald	Liberal	Ontario (Ontario)	January 20, 1879	79-80	
Jeremiah Northup	Liberal	Nova Scotia (Halifax)	April 10, 1879	62-63	
Robert William Weir Carrall	Conservative	British Columbia (British Columbia)	September 19, 1879	42	
Benjamin Seymour	Conservative	Ontario (Newcastle)	March 23, 1880	73-74	
George Brown	Liberal	Ontario (Lambton)	May 9, 1880	61	Assassination - shot
David Christie	Liberal	Ontario (Erie)	December 14, 1880	62	Complications from gangrene
Harcourt Burland Bull	Conservative	Ontario (Hamilton)	August 12, 1881	57	
William Henry Brouse	Reformer	Ontario (Prescott)	August 23, 1881	57	
Edward Goff Penny	Liberal	Quebec (Alma)	October 11, 1881	61	
Adam Hope	Liberal	Ontario (Hamilton)	August 7, 1882	69	
Léandre Dumouchel	Conservative	Quebec (Mille Isles)	September 24, 1882	71	
John Hamilton	Conservative	Ontario (Kingston)	October 10, 1882	79-80	
Jacques-Olivier Bureau	Liberal	Quebec (De Lorimier)	February 7, 1883	63	
Thomas Nicholson Gibbs	Conservative	Ontario (Newmarket)	April 27, 1883	62	
David Edward Price	Conservative	Quebec (The Laurentides)	August 22, 1883	57	
John Bourinot	Conservative	Nova Scotia (Nova Scotia)	January 19, 1884	69	Stroke
James Skead	Conservative	Ontario (Rideau)	July 5, 1884	66	Complications from a lung injury
Christian Henry Pozer	Nationalist	Quebec (Lauzon)	July 18, 1884	48	
William Muirhead	Liberal	New Brunswick (Chatham)	December 29, 1884	65	
James Rea Benson	Conservative	Ontario (Saint Catharines)	March 18, 1885	78	
John Simpson	Liberal	Ontario (Bowmanville)	March 21, 1885	72	
Jean-Charles Chapais	Conservative	Quebec (De La Durantaye)	July 17, 1885	73	
Joseph Northwood	Conservative	Ontario (Lambton)	October 29, 1886	77	
Charles Cormier	Liberal	Quebec (Kennebec)	May 7, 1887	73	
William McMaster	Liberal	Ontario (Midland)	September 22, 1887	75	
Louis Adélard Sénécal	Conservative	Quebec (Mille Isles)	October 7, 1887	58	
Josiah Burr Plumb	Conservative	Ontario (Ontario)	March 12, 1888	71	
Jean-Baptiste Rolland	Conservative	Quebec (Mille Isles)	March 22, 1888	73	
James Ferrier	Conservative	Quebec (Shawinigan)	May 30, 1888	87	
Pierre-Étienne Fortin	Conservative	Quebec (Kennebec)	June 15, 1888	64	
John Ferguson	Conservative	New Brunswick (Bathurst)	August 21, 1888	74	
James Gibb Ross	Conservative	Quebec (The Laurentides)	October 1, 1888	69	
Thomas Ryan	Conservative	Quebec (Victoria)	May 25, 1889	84	
James Turner	Conservative	Ontario (Ontario)	October 10, 1889	63	
Richard Charles Hardisty	Conservative	Northwest Territories (Edmonton)	October 15, 1889	58	thrown from buggy
François-Xavier-Anselme Trudel	Conservative	Quebec (De Salaberry)	January 17, 1890	51	
Charles-Séraphin Rodier	Conservative	Quebec (Mille Isles)	January 26, 1890	71	
John Macdonald	Independent Liberal	Ontario (Ontario)	February 4, 1890	65	
Thomas Dickson Archibald	Conservative	Nova Scotia (North Sydney)	October 18, 1890	77	
Robert Poore Haythorne	Liberal	Prince Edward Island (Queen's)	May 7, 1891	75	
Elijah Leonard	Liberal	Ontario (London)	May 14, 1891	76	
William Hunter Odell	Conservative	New Brunswick (Rockwood)	July 25, 1891	79	
Pierre Baillargeon	Liberal	Quebec (Stadacona)	December 15, 1891	79	
Anselme Homère Pâquet	Liberal	Quebec (De la Vallière)	December 22, 1891	61	
Gardner Green Stevens	Liberal	Quebec (Bedford)	April 15, 1892	77	
Marc-Amable Girard	Conservative	Manitoba (Saint Boniface)	September 12, 1892	70	
Robert Patterson Grant	Liberal	Nova Scotia (Pictou)	November 13, 1892	78	
Donald Montgomery	Conservative	Prince Edward Island (Park Corner)	July 31, 1893	85	
John Abbott	Conservative	Quebec (Inkerman	October 30, 1893	72	Brain cancer
Amos Edwin Botsford	Conservative	New Brunswick (New Brunswick)	March 19, 1894	89	
Billa Flint	Liberal	Ontario (Trent)	June 15, 1894	89	
John Glasier	Liberal	New Brunswick (Sunbury)	July 7, 1894	84	Cholera
Joseph Tassé	Conservative	Quebec (De Salaberry	January 17, 1895	46	
Kennedy Francis Burns	Conservative	New Brunswick (New Brunswick)	June 23, 1895	53	Pneumonia
Edward Murphy	Conservative	Quebec (Victoria)	December 5, 1895	77	
Henry Adolphus Newman Kaulback	Conservative	Nova Scotia (Lunenburg)	January 8, 1896	65	
Robert Read	Conservative	Ontario (Quinté)	June 29, 1896	81	
David Lewis Macpherson	Conservative	Ontario (Saugeen)	August 16, 1896	77	
John Ferguson	Conservative	Ontario (Ontario)	September 22, 1896	57	
François Béchard	Liberal	Quebec (De Lorimier)	April 13, 1897	66	
Théodore Robitaille	Conservative	Quebec (Gulf)	August 17, 1897	63	
Joseph Octave Arsenault	Conservative	Prince Edward Island (Prince Edward Island)	December 14, 1897	69	
Pierre Antoine Deblois	Conservative	Quebec (La Salle)	June 21, 1898	82	
Alexander Macfarlane	Conservative	Nova Scotia (Wallace)	December 14, 1898	80	
Michael Adams	Conservative	New Brunswick (Northumberland)	January 2, 1899	53	
Charles Arkoll Boulton	Conservative	Manitoba (Marquette)	May 15, 1899	58	
William Eli Sanford	Conservative	Ontario (Hamilton)	July 10, 1899	60	Drowning
Joseph Hyacinthe Bellerose	Conservative	Quebec (De Lanaudière)	August 13, 1899	79	
Thomas Temple	Conservative	New Brunswick (York)	August 25, 1899	80	
Evan John Price	Conservative	Quebec (The Laurentides)	August 31, 1899	59	

== House of Commons ==
Member	Party	Province/Riding	Date of death	Age at death (years)	Cause
Thomas D'Arcy McGee	Conservative	Quebec (Montreal West)	April 7, 1868	42	Assassinated - shot
Thomas Sutherland Parker	Liberal	Ontario (Wellington Centre)	October 24, 1868	39	Fall
John Mercer Johnson	Liberal	New Brunswick (Northumberland)	November 8, 1868	50	Stomach illness
Thomas Killam	Anti-Confederate	Nova Scotia (Yarmouth)	December 15, 1868	66	
William Joseph Croke	Anti-Confederate	Nova Scotia (Richmond)	March 11, 1869	29	
Thomas Kirkpatrick	Conservative	Ontario (Frontenac)	March 26, 1870	64	
William Henry Chipman	Liberal	Nova Scotia (Kings)	April 10, 1870	62	Smallpox
Alexandre-Édouard Kierzkowski	Liberal	Quebec (Saint-Hyacinthe)	August 4, 1870	53	
Thomas McCarthy	Conservative	Quebec (Richelieu)	September 23, 1870	37-38	
William Murray Caldwell	Liberal	New Brunswick (Restigouche)	September 29, 1870	38	
John Sandfield Macdonald	Liberal	Ontario (Cornwall)	June 1, 1872	59	
Robert MacFarlane	Liberal	Ontario (Perth South)	June 1, 1872	37	
John Bolton	Liberal	New Brunswick (Charlotte)	July 14, 1872	47	
Francis Henry Burton	Conservative	Ontario (Durham East)	July 18, 1872	54-55	
Thomas Clark Street	Conservative	Ontario (Welland)	September 6, 1872	57-58	
George-Étienne Cartier	Conservative	Manitoba (Provencher)	May 20, 1873	58	Bright's Disease
Charles Connell	Liberal	New Brunswick (Carleton)	June 28, 1873	64	
John Bower Lewis	Conservative	Ontario (City of Ottawa)	January 24, 1874	56	
William Harvey	Liberal	Ontario (Elgin East)	June 14, 1874	53	Smallpox
Robert Cunningham	Liberal	Manitoba (Provencher)	July 4, 1874	38	
Thomas Scatcherd	Liberal	Ontario (Middlesex North)	April 15, 1876	52	
Adam Gordon	Liberal	Ontario (Ontario North)	May 28, 1876	44	
Malcolm Cameron	Liberal	Ontario (Ontario South)	June 1, 1876	68	
John Hillyard Cameron	Conservative	Ontario (Cardwell)	November 14, 1876	59	Heart attack
Michael Cayley	Liberal	Quebec (Beauharnois)	December 2, 1878	36	
Pierre-Alexis Tremblay	Liberal	Quebec (Charlevoix)	January 4, 1879	51	
Hugh McLeod	Conservative	Nova Scotia (Cape Breton)	August 5, 1879	36	
Daniel Galbraith	Liberal	Ontario (Lanark North)	December 17, 1879	66	
Luther Hamilton Holton	Liberal	Quebec (Châteauguay)	March 14, 1880	63	
Edmund Leavens Chandler	Liberal	Quebec (Brome)	August 21, 1880	50	
Thomas Oliver	Liberal	Ontario (Oxford North)	November 8, 1880	59	
Joshua Spencer Thompson	Conservative	British Columbia (Cariboo)	December 20, 1880	51-52	
Joseph Keeler	Conservative	Ontario (Northumberland East)	January 21, 1881	56	
George Heber Connell	Independent	New Brunswick (Carleton)	February 15, 1881	45	
William Carruthers Little	Conservative	Ontario (Simcoe South)	December 31, 1881	61	
Jacques-Philippe Lantier	Conservative	Quebec (Soulanges)	September 15, 1882	68	
John Pickard	Independent Liberal	New Brunswick (Carleton)	December 17, 1883	59	
Frédéric Houde	Nationalist Conservative	Quebec (Maskinongé)	November 15, 1884	37	Tuberculosis
Isaac Burpee	Liberal	New Brunswick (City and County of Saint John)	March 1, 1885	59	
William Thomas Benson	Conservative	Ontario (Grenville South)	June 8, 1885	61	
Arthur Trefusis Heneage Williams	Conservative	Ontario (Durham East)	July 4, 1885	48	Fever
David Thompson	Liberal	Ontario (Haldimand)	April 18, 1886	49	
Joshua Attwood Reynolds Homer	Conservative	British Columbia (New Westminster)	September 20, 1886	59	
Robert Moffat	Conservative	New Brunswick (Restigouche)	April 25, 1887	43	
John Campbell	Conservative	Nova Scotia (Digby)	May 25, 1887	37	
Robert Campbell	Liberal	Ontario (Renfrew South)	June 14, 1887	69	
Simon-Xavier Cimon	Conservative	Quebec (Charlevoix)	June 26, 1887	57	Apoplexy
Henri-Jules Juchereau Duchesnay	Nationalist Conservative	Quebec (Dorchester)	July 6, 1887	42	Typhoid fever
Jean-Baptiste Labelle	Conservative	Quebec (Richelieu)	August 3, 1887	51	
Alexander Robertson	Conservative	Ontario (Hastings West)	February 29, 1888	49	
George Clayes	Liberal	Quebec (Missisquoi)	March 3, 1888	57	
Thomas White	Conservative	Ontario (Cardwell)	April 21, 1888	57	Pneumonia
Athanase Gaudet	Nationalist Conservative	Quebec (Nicolet)	April 29, 1888	39	
Charles-Joseph Coursol	Conservative	Quebec (Nicolet)	August 4, 1888	68	
John Henry Pope	Conservative	Quebec (Compton)	April 1, 1889	69	
William Goodhue Perley	Conservative	Ontario (Ottawa)	April 1, 1890	69	
Donald Chisholm	Conservative	British Columbia (New Westminster)	April 5, 1890	67-68	
Adam Hudspeth	Conservative	Ontario (Victoria South)	May 5, 1890	53	
Joseph Esdras Alfred de Saint-Georges	Liberal	Quebec (Portneuf)	June 19, 1890	40	
Alexis Dessaint	Liberal	Quebec (Kamouraska)	December 18, 1890	43	Train accident
John A. Macdonald	Conservative	Ontario (Kingston)	June 6, 1891	76	Stroke
Jean-Baptiste Daoust	Conservative	Quebec (Two Mountains)	December 28, 1891	74	
Samuel Barton Burdett	Liberal	Ontario (Hastings East)	January 20, 1892	48	
Alexander Mackenzie	Liberal	Ontario (York East)	April 17, 1892	70	Stroke caused by a fall
Édouard H. Léger	Conservative	New Brunswock (Kent)	August 8, 1892	26	
James Armstrong	Liberal	Ontario (Middlesex South)	January 26, 1893	62	
David William Gordon	Conservative	British Columbia (Vancouver)	February 19, 1893	60	
John Hearn	Conservative	Quebec (Quebec West)	May 17, 1894	67	Tuberculosis
Félix Geoffrion	Liberal	Quebec (Verchères)	August 7, 1894	61	
John Sparrow David Thompson	Conservative	Nova Scotia (Antigonish)	December 12, 1894	49	Heart attack
Frank Madill	Conservative	Ontario (Ontario North)	October 25, 1895	42	
Henry Simard	Liberal	Quebec (Charlevoix)	November 6, 1895	59	
John Bryson	Conservative	Quebec (Pontiac)	January 20, 1896	46	
Guillaume Amyot	Nationalist Conservative	Quebec (Bellechasse)	March 30, 1896	53	
Frederick Charles Denison	Conservative	Ontario (Toronto West)	April 15, 1896	49	Stomach cancer
John Clark	Liberal	Ontario (Grey North)	July 27, 1896	60-61	Typhoid fever, peritonitis
Darby Bergin	Conservative	Ontario (Cornwall and Stormont)	October 22, 1896	70	
William Le Boutillier Fauvel	Liberal	Quebec (Bonaventure)	February 8, 1897	47	
Charles-Eugène Pouliot	Liberal	Quebec (Témiscouata)	June 24, 1897	40	
Fabien Boisvert	Independent Conservative	Quebec (Nicolet)	November 12, 1897	58	
Stanislaus Francis Perry	Liberal	Prince Edward Island (Prince)	February 24, 1898	74	
Flavien Dupont	Conservative	Quebec (Bagot)	March 12, 1898	51	
Dalton McCarthy	McCarthyite	Ontario (Simcoe North)	May 11, 1898	61	Carriage accident
Pierre Malcom Guay	Liberal	Quebec (Lévis)	February 19, 1899	50	
Richard Willis Jameson	Liberal	Manitoba (Winnipeg)	February 21, 1899	47	Accidental self-inflicted gunshot wound
John Fisher Wood	Conservative	Ontario (Brockville)	March 14, 1899	46	Heart failure
William Bullock Ives	Conservative	Quebec (Town of Sherbrooke)	July 15, 1899	57	
Christophe-Alphonse Geoffrion	Liberal	Quebec (Verchères)	July 18, 1899	55	
James David Edgar	Liberal	Ontario (Ontario West)	July 31, 1899	57	

== See also ==
- List of members of the Canadian Parliament who died in office (1900–1949)
- List of members of the Canadian Parliament who died in office (1950–1999)
- List of members of the Canadian Parliament who died in office (2000–)
