= List of members of the Senate of Canada (M) =

| Senator | Lifespan | Party | Prov. | Entered | Left | Appointed by | Left due to | For life? |
|---|---|---|---|---|---|---|---|---|
| Jane MacAdam | 1957–present | | PE | 3 May 2023 | — | Trudeau, J. | — | |
| Creelman MacArthur | 1874–1943 | L | PE | 5 September 1925 | 27 December 1943 | King | Death | Y |
| Andrew Archibald Macdonald | 1829–1912 | LC | PE | 11 May 1891 | 21 March 1912 | Macdonald | Death | Y |
| Finlay Macdonald | 1923–2002 | PC | NS | 21 December 1984 | 4 January 1998 | Mulroney | Retirement | |
| John Macdonald | 1824–1890 | IL | ON | 9 November 1887 | 4 February 1890 | Macdonald | Death | Y |
| John Alexander Macdonald | 1883–1945 | C | NS | 2 March 1932 | 11 June 1945 | Bennett | Death | Y |
| John Alexander Macdonald | 1874–1948 | C | PE | 20 July 1935 | 15 November 1948 | Bennett | Death | Y |
| John Joseph MacDonald | 1891–1986 | PC | PE | 27 January 1958 | 20 April 1971 | Diefenbaker | Resignation | Y |
| John Michael Macdonald | 1906–1997 | PC | NS | 24 June 1960 | 20 June 1997 | Diefenbaker | Death | Y |
| Michael L. MacDonald | 1955–present | C | NS | 2 January 2009 | — | Harper | — | |
| William John Macdonald | 1832–1916 | C | BC | 13 December 1871 | 13 April 1915 | Macdonald | Resignation | Y |
| William Ross Macdonald | 1891–1976 | L | ON | 12 June 1953 | 22 December 1967 | St. Laurent | Voluntary retirement | Y |
| Angus Claude Macdonell | 1861–1924 | C | ON | 1 August 1917 | 1 January 1921 | Borden | Resignation | Y |
| Archibald Hayes Macdonell | 1868–1939 | C | ON | 7 November 1921 | 12 November 1939 | Meighen | Death | Y |
| Allan MacEachen | 1921–2017 | L | NS | 29 June 1984 | 6 July 1996 | Trudeau, P. | Retirement | |
| Alexander Macfarlane | 1818–1898 | C | NS | 10 October 1870 | 14 December 1898 | Macdonald | Death | Y |
| Donald MacInnes | 1824–1900 | L | ON | 24 December 1881 | 2 December 1900 | Macdonald | Death | Y |
| Robert Mackay | 1840–1916 | L | QC | 21 January 1901 | 25 December 1916 | Laurier | Death | Y |
| William MacKay | 1847–1915 | C | NS | 20 November 1912 | 8 November 1915 | Borden | Death | Y |
| David MacKeen | 1839–1916 | C | NS | 21 February 1896 | 15 October 1915 | Bowell | Resignation | Y |
| Ian Alistair Mackenzie | 1890–1949 | L | BC | 19 January 1948 | 2 September 1949 | King | Death | Y |
| Norman MacKenzie | 1894–1986 | IL | BC | 24 February 1966 | 5 January 1969 | Pearson | Retirement | |
| James Angus MacKinnon | 1881–1958 | L | AB | 9 May 1949 | 18 April 1958 | St. Laurent | Death | Y |
| Donald MacLennan | 1877–1953 | L | NS | 29 January 1940 | 19 October 1953 | King | Death | Y |
| Alan Macnaughton | 1903–1999 | L | QC | 8 July 1966 | 30 July 1978 | Pearson | Retirement | |
| David Lewis Macpherson | 1818–1896 | C | ON | 23 October 1867 | 16 August 1896 | Royal proclamation | Death | Y |
| Heath MacQuarrie | 1919–2002 | PC | PE | 3 October 1979 | 18 September 1994 | Clark | Retirement | |
| Duncan Kenneth MacTavish | 1899–1963 | L | ON | 11 June 1963 | 15 November 1963 | Pearson | Death | Y |
| Shirley Maheu | 1931–2006 | L | QC | 1 February 1996 | 1 February 2006 | Chrétien | Death | |
| Frank Mahovlich | 1938–present | L | ON | 11 June 1998 | 10 January 2013 | Chrétien | Retirement | |
| Charles-Christophe Malhiot | 1808–1874 | L | QC | 23 October 1867 | 9 November 1874 | Royal proclamation | Death | Y |
| Marian Maloney | 1924–2010 | L | ON | 11 June 1998 | 16 August 1999 | Chrétien | Retirement | |
| Ghislain Maltais | 1944–present | C | QC | 6 January 2012 | 22 April 2019 | Harper | Retirement | |
| Ernest Manning | 1908–1996 | SC | AB | 7 October 1970 | 20 September 1983 | Trudeau, P. | Retirement | |
| Fabian Manning | 1964–present | C | NL | 22 December 2008 | 28 March 2011 | Harper | Resigned | |
| Fabian Manning | 1964–present | C | NL | 25 May 2011 | — | Harper | — | |
| Jean Marchand | 1918–1988 | L | QC | 9 December 1976 | 15 December 1983 | Trudeau, P. | Resignation | |
| Leonard Marchand | 1933–2016 | L | BC | 29 June 1984 | 1 March 1998 | Trudeau, P. | Resignation | |
| Arthur Marcotte | 1873–1958 | C | SK | 6 July 1931 | 18 August 1958 | Bennett | Death | Y |
| Lorna Marsden | 1942–present | L | ON | 24 January 1984 | 31 August 1992 | Trudeau, P. | Resignation | |
| Duncan Marshall | 1872–1946 | L | ON | 20 January 1938 | 16 January 1946 | King | Death | Y |
| Elizabeth Marshall | 1951–present | C | NL | 29 January 2010 | 23 March 2026 | Harper | Retirement | |
| Jack Marshall | 1919–2004 | PC | NL | 23 March 1978 | 26 November 1994 | Trudeau, P. | Retirement | |
| Richard Martel | 1961–present | NA | QC | 7 July 2026 | | Carney | | |
| Paul Martin Sr. | 1903–1992 | L | ON | 20 April 1968 | 30 October 1974 | Trudeau, P. | Resignation | |
| Peter Francis Martin | 1856–1935 | C | NS | 5 December 1921 | 2 May 1935 | Meighen | Death | Y |
| Yonah Martin | 1965–present | C | BC | 2 January 2009 | — | Harper | — | |
| Sabi Marwah | 1951–present | NA | ON | 10 November 2016 | 7 September 2023 | Trudeau, J. | Resignation | |
| James Mason | 1843–1918 | C | ON | 26 May 1913 | 16 July 1918 | Borden | Death | Y |
| Paul Massicotte | 1951–present | L | QC | 26 June 2003 | 9 September 2025 | Chrétien | Resignation | |
| Louis-Rodrigue Masson | 1833–1903 | C | QC | 29 September 1882 | 6 November 1884 | Macdonald | Resignation | Y |
| Louis-Rodrigue Masson | 1833–1903 | C | QC | 3 February 1890 | 11 June 1903 | Macdonald | Resignation | Y |
| Roderick Matheson | 1793–1873 | C | ON | 23 October 1867 | 13 January 1873 | Royal proclamation | Death | Y |
| Marnie McBean | 1968–present | | ON | 20 December 2023 | — | Trudeau, J. | — | |
| Alexander McCall | 1844–1925 | C | ON | 26 May 1913 | 10 June 1925 | Borden | Death | Y |
| Lachlin McCallum | 1823–1903 | LC | ON | 4 February 1887 | 13 January 1903 | Macdonald | Death | Y |
| Mary Jane McCallum | 1952–present | C | MB | 4 December 2017 | — | Trudeau, J. | — | |
| Abner Reid McClelan | 1831–1917 | L | NB | 23 October 1867 | 9 December 1896 | Royal proclamation | Resignation | Y |
| Archibald McCoig | 1873–1927 | L | ON | 4 January 1922 | 21 November 1927 | King | Death | Y |
| John Mccormick | 1858–1936 | C | NS | 21 September 1921 | 21 February 1936 | Meighen | Death | Y |
| Elaine McCoy | 1946–2020 | PC→IPC→NA | AB | 24 March 2005 | 29 December 2020 | Martin | Death | |
| Walter McCrea | 1810–1892 | L | ON | 23 October 1867 | 5 January 1871 | Royal proclamation | Resignation | Y |
| Jonathan McCully | 1809–1877 | L | NS | 23 October 1867 | 28 September 1870 | Royal proclamation | Resignation | Y |
| Wallace McCutcheon | 1906–1969 | PC | ON | 9 August 1962 | 13 May 1968 | Diefenbaker | Resignation | Y |
| Alexander Hamilton McDonald | 1919–1980 | L | SK | 13 August 1965 | 31 March 1980 | Pearson | Death | |
| Charles McDonald | 1867–1936 | L | BC | 30 December 1935 | 6 October 1936 | King | Death | Y |
| Donald McDonald | 1816–1879 | L | ON | 23 October 1867 | 20 January 1879 | Royal proclamation | Death | Y |
| John Alexander McDonald | 1889–1962 | L | NS | 18 April 1945 | 16 April 1962 | King | Death | Y |
| John Anthony McDonald | 1875–1948 | I | NB | 17 February 1921 | 12 December 1948 | Meighen | Death | Y |
| William McDonald | 1837–1916 | C | NS | 12 May 1884 | 4 July 1916 | Macdonald | Death | Y |
| Wilfrid Laurier McDougald | 1881–1942 | L | QC | 25 June 1926 | 3 May 1932 | King | Resignation | Y |
| Charles McElman | 1920–2000 | L | NB | 24 February 1966 | 1 April 1990 | Pearson | Resignation | |
| Gerry McGeer | 1888–1947 | L | BC | 9 June 1945 | 11 August 1947 | King | Death | Y |
| Frederic McGrand | 1895–1988 | L | NB | 28 July 1955 | 22 January 1988 | St. Laurent | Resignation | Y |
| James Drummond McGregor | 1838–1918 | L | NS | 24 April 1903 | 1 October 1910 | Laurier | Resignation | Y |
| William Henry McGuire | 1875–1957 | L | ON | 20 December 1926 | 31 October 1957 | King | Death | Y |
| George McHugh | 1845–1926 | L | ON | 21 January 1901 | 28 November 1926 | Laurier | Death | Y |
| George McIlraith | 1908–1992 | L | ON | 27 April 1972 | 29 July 1983 | Trudeau, P. | Retirement | |
| Thomas Robert McInnes | 1840–1904 | I | BC | 24 December 1881 | 18 November 1897 | Macdonald | Resignation | Y |
| Tom McInnis | 1945–present | C | NS | 6 September 2012 | 9 April 2020 | Harper | Retirement | |
| James P. McIntyre | 1883–1957 | L | PE | 19 February 1943 | 8 April 1957 | King | Death | Y |
| Paul McIntyre | 1944–present | C | NB | 6 September 2012 | 1 November 2019 | Harper | Retirement | |
| Thomas McKay | 1839–1912 | LC | NS | 24 December 1881 | 13 January 1912 | Macdonald | Death | Y |
| Stanley McKeen | 1897–1966 | L | BC | 27 January 1947 | 1 December 1966 | King | Death | Y |
| George Crawford McKindsey | 1829–1901 | C | ON | 11 January 1884 | 12 February 1901 | Macdonald | Death | Y |
| Peter McLaren | 1833–1919 | C | ON | 21 February 1890 | 23 May 1919 | Macdonald | Death | Y |
| Alexander Neil McLean | 1885–1967 | L | NB | 18 April 1945 | 12 March 1967 | King | Death | Y |
| Donald A. McLean | 1907–1973 | L | NB | 15 March 1968 | 5 November 1973 | Pearson | Death | |
| John McLean | 1846–1936 | C | PE | 3 December 1915 | 20 February 1936 | Borden | Death | Y |
| Archibald McLelan | 1824–1890 | LC | NS | 21 June 1869 | 20 May 1881 | Macdonald | Resignation | Y |
| John Stewart McLennan | 1853–1939 | C | NS | 10 February 1916 | 15 September 1939 | Borden | Death | Y |
| William McMaster | 1811–1887 | L | ON | 23 October 1867 | 22 September 1887 | Royal proclamation | Death | Y |
| Lendrum McMeans | 1859–1941 | C | MB | 26 July 1917 | 13 September 1941 | Borden | Death | Y |
| Donald McMillan | 1835–1914 | C | ON | 11 January 1884 | 26 July 1914 | Macdonald | Death | Y |
| James McMullen | 1833–1913 | L | ON | 11 February 1902 | 18 March 1913 | Laurier | Death | Y |
| John M. McNair | 1957–present | | NB | 31 October 2023 | — | Trudeau, J. | — | |
| William Craig McNamara | 1904–1984 | L | MB | 7 October 1970 | 8 August 1979 | Trudeau, P. | Retirement | |
| Marilou McPhedran | 1951–present | NA | MB | 10 November 2016 | — | Trudeau, J. | — | |
| Alexander Duncan McRae | 1874–1946 | C | BC | 4 September 1931 | 26 June 1946 | Bennett | Death | Y |
| Peter McSweeney | 1842–1921 | L | NB | 15 March 1899 | 2 February 1921 | Laurier | Death | Y |
| Marie-Françoise Mégie | 1950–present | NA | QC | 25 November 2016 | 20 September 2025 | Trudeau, J. | — | Y |
| Arthur Meighen | 1874–1960 | C | ON | 2 March 1932 | 16 January 1942 | Bennett | Resignation | Y |
| Michael Meighen | 1939–present | C | ON | 27 September 1990 | 6 February 2012 | Mulroney | Resignation | |
| Terry Mercer | 1947–present | L | NS | 7 November 2003 | 6 May 2022 | Chrétien | Retirement | |
| Pana Merchant | 1943–present | L | SK | 12 December 2002 | 31 March 2017 | Chrétien | Resignation | |
| Léonce Mercier | 1926–2019 | L | QC | 9 August 1996 | 11 August 2001 | Chrétien | Retirement | |
| Don Meredith | 1964–present | C→NA | ON | 18 December 2010 | 10 May 2017 | Harper | Resignation | |
| Samuel Merner | 1823–1908 | C | ON | 12 January 1887 | 11 August 1908 | Macdonald | Death | Y |
| Léon Méthot | 1895–1972 | PC | QC | 12 October 1957 | 6 August 1972 | Diefenbaker | Death | Y |
| Hervé Michaud | 1912–1978 | L | NB | 15 March 1968 | 5 June 1978 | Pearson | Death | |
| Edward Michener | 1869–1947 | C | AB | 5 February 1918 | 16 June 1947 | Borden | Death | Y |
| William Miller | 1835–1912 | LC | NS | 23 October 1867 | 23 February 1912 | Royal proclamation | Death | Y |
| David Mills | 1831–1903 | L | ON | 13 November 1896 | 7 February 1902 | Laurier | Resignation | Y |
| Samuel Sylvester Mills | 1806–1874 | C | ON | 23 October 1867 | 24 January 1874 | Royal proclamation | Death | Y |
| John Milne | 1839–1922 | C | ON | 3 December 1915 | 4 March 1922 | Borden | Death | Y |
| Lorna Milne | 1934–2023 | L | ON | 21 September 1995 | 13 December 2009 | Chrétien | Retirement | |
| Grant Mitchell | 1951–present | L→IL→NA | AB | 24 March 2005 | 24 April 2020 | Martin | Resignation | |
| Peter Mitchell | 1824–1899 | LC | NB | 23 October 1867 | 13 July 1872 | Royal proclamation | Resignation | Y |
| William Mitchell | 1851–1926 | L | QC | 5 March 1904 | 10 May 1926 | Laurier | Death | Y |
| Julie Miville-Dechêne | 1959–present | | QC | 20 June 2018 | — | Trudeau, J. | — | |
| Percy Mockler | 1949–present | C | NB | 2 January 2009 | 13 April 2024 | Harper | Retirement | |
| Farah Mohamed | 1970–present | | ON | 7 March 2025 | — | Trudeau, J. | — | |
| Gildas Molgat | 1927–2001 | L | MB | 7 October 1970 | 28 February 2001 | Trudeau, P. | Death | |
| John Patrick Molloy | 1873–1948 | L | MB | 6 October 1925 | 16 March 1948 | King | Death | Y |
| Hartland Molson | 1907–2002 | I | QC | 28 July 1955 | 31 May 1993 | St. Laurent | Resignation | Y |
| Lucie Moncion | 1958–present | NA | ON | 10 November 2016 | — | Trudeau, J. | — | |
| Gustave Monette | 1887–1969 | PC | QC | 12 October 1957 | 23 December 1969 | Diefenbaker | Death | Y |
| Donald Montgomery | 1808–1893 | C | PE | 18 October 1873 | 31 July 1893 | Macdonald | Death | Y |
| Hippolyte Montplaisir | 1839–1927 | LC | QC | 9 February 1891 | 20 June 1927 | Macdonald | Death | Y |
| Rosemary Moodie | 1956–present | | ON | 12 December 2018 | — | Trudeau, J. | — | |
| Wilfred Moore | 1942–present | L | NS | 26 September 1996 | 14 January 2017 | Chrétien | Retirement | |
| Lucien Moraud | 1885–1951 | C | QC | 30 December 1933 | 29 May 1951 | Bennett | Death | Y |
| Pierre Moreau | 1957–present | | QC | 10 September 2024 | — | Trudeau, J. | — | |
| Yves Morin | 1929–2024 | L | QC | 8 March 2001 | 28 November 2004 | Chrétien | Retirement | |
| Oliver Mowat | 1820–1903 | L | ON | 15 July 1896 | 18 November 1897 | Laurier | Resignation | Y |
| Tracy Muggli | 1964/1965–present | | SK | 16 August 2024 | — | Trudeau, J. | — | |
| Robert Muir | 1919–2011 | PC | NS | 26 March 1979 | 10 November 1994 | Trudeau, P. | Retirement | |
| William Muirhead | 1819–1884 | L | NB | 4 January 1873 | 29 December 1884 | Macdonald | Death | Y |
| Robert Alexander Mulholland | 1860–1927 | C | ON | 12 March 1918 | 1 October 1927 | Borden | Death | Y |
| Henry Mullins | 1861–1952 | C | MB | 14 August 1935 | 5 September 1950 | Bennett | Resignation | Y |
| Jim Munson | 1946–present | L | ON | 10 December 2003 | 14 July 2021 | Chrétien | Retirement | |
| James Murdock | 1871–1949 | L | ON | 20 March 1930 | 15 May 1949 | King | Death | Y |
| Charles Murphy | 1862–1935 | L | ON | 5 September 1925 | 24 November 1935 | King | Death | Y |
| Edward Murphy | 1818–1895 | LC | QC | 30 May 1889 | 5 December 1895 | Macdonald | Death | Y |
| Patrick Charles Murphy | 1868–1925 | C | PE | 20 November 1912 | 6 March 1925 | Borden | Death | Y |
| Lowell Murray | 1936–present | PC | ON | 13 September 1979 | 26 September 2011 | Clark | Retirement | |
