= List of members of the Parliament of Canada who died in office (1900–1949) =

The following is a list of members of the Canadian Parliament who died while they were serving their terms from 1900 until 1949

== Senate ==
Member	Party	Province/Division	Date of death	Age at death (years)	Cause
James Davies Lewin	Liberal	New Brunswick (Saint John (Lancaster))	March 11, 1900	87	
Donald McInnes	Conservative	Ontario (Burlington)	December 2, 1900	76	
Frank Smith	Conservative	Ontario (Toronto)	January 17, 1901	78	
George Crawford McKindsey	Conservative	Ontario (Milton)	February 12, 1901	71	
William Johnston Almon	Conservative	Nova Scotia (Halifax)	February 19, 1901	85	
Joseph Arthur Paquet	Liberal	Quebec (La Salle)	March 29, 1901	43	
John Jones Ross	Conservative	Quebec (De La Durantaye)	May 4, 1901	69	
Joseph Octave Villeneuve	Conservative	Quebec (De Salaberry)	June 27, 1901	65	
George William Allan	Conservative	Ontario (York)	July 24, 1901	79	
Samuel Prowse	Conservative	Prince Edward Island (King's)	January 14, 1902	66	
Alphonse Arthur Miville Déchêne	Liberal	Quebec (De La Durantaye)	May 1, 1902	54	
Francis Clemow	Conservative	Ontario (Rideau)	May 28, 1902	81	
Clarence Primrose	Conservative	Nova Scotia (Pictou)	December 2, 1902	72	
John O'Donohoe	Conservative	Ontario (Erie)	December 7, 1902	78	
Joseph-François Armand	Conservative	Quebec (Repentigny)	January 1, 1903	82	
Lachlin McCallum	Conservative	Ontario (Monck)	January 13, 1903	79	
Andrew Trew Wood	Liberal	Ontario (Hamilton)	January 21, 1903	76	
Arthur Hill Gillmor	Liberal	New Brunswick (New Brunswick)	April 13, 1903	79	
James O'Brien	Conservative	Quebec (Victoria)	May 28, 1903	66	
Robert Barry Dickey	Conservative	Nova Scotia (Amherst)	July 14, 1903	91	
Matthew Henry Cochrane	Conservative	Quebec (Wellington)	August 12, 1903	79	
George Landerkin	Liberal	Ontario (Grey)	October 4, 1903	64	
James Reid	Conservative	British Columbia (Cariboo)	May 3, 1904	64	
James Dever	Liberal	New Brunswick (Saint John)	May 7, 1904	79	
James Cox Aikins	Conservative	Ontario (Ontario)	August 8, 1904	81	
David Wark	Liberal	New Brunswick (Fredericton)	August 20, 1905	101	
Thomas Reuben Black	Liberal	Nova Scotia (Amherst)	September 14, 1905	72	
George Taylor Fulford	Liberal	Ontario (Brockville)	October 15, 1905	53	Automobile accident
Charles Edward Church	Liberal	Nova Scotia (Lunenburg)	January 3, 1906	71	
Alexander Vidal	Conservative	Ontario (Sarnia)	November 18, 1906	87	
William Kerr	Liberal	Ontario (Northumberland)	November 22, 1906	70	
John Dobson	Conservative	Ontario (Lindsay)	January 27, 1907	82	
William Hales Hingston	Conservative	Quebec (Rougemont)	February 19, 1907	77	
Charles Eusèbe Casgrain	Conservative	Ontario (Windsor)	March 8, 1907	81	
John Lovitt	Liberal	Nova Scotia (Yarmouth)	April 13, 1908	75	
Samuel Merner	Conservative	Ontario (Hamburg)	August 11, 1908	85	
Thomas-Alfred Bernier	Conservative	Manitoba (Saint-Boniface)	December 30, 1908	64	
Joseph-Rosaire Thibaudeau	Liberal	Quebec (Rigaud)	June 16, 1909	71	
William Dell Perley	Conservative	Saskatchewan (Wolseley)	July 15, 1909	71	
Donald Ferguson	Conservative	Prince Edward Island (Queen's)	September 4, 1909	70	
George Alexander Drummond	Conservative	Quebec (Kennebec)	February 2, 1910	80	
George Barnard Baker	Conservative	Quebec (Bedford)	February 9, 1910	76	
Louis-Joseph Forget	Conservative	Quebec (Saurel)	April 7, 1911	58	
Ambroise-Hilaire Comeau	Liberal	Nova Scotia (Digby County)	August 25, 1911	50	Leukemia
Noé E. Chevrier	Liberal	Manitoba (Winnipeg)	October 9, 1911	65	
John Carling	Conservative	Ontario (London)	November 6, 1911	83	
Thomas McKay	Conservative	Nova Scotia (Truro)	January 13, 1912	73	
William Miller	Conservative	Nova Scotia (Richmond)	February 23, 1912	77	
William Ross	Liberal	Nova Scotia (Victoria)	March 17, 1912	87	
Andrew Archibald Macdonald	Conservative	Prince Edward Island (Charlottetown)	March 21, 1912	83	
John Henry Wilson	Liberal	Ontario (Saint Thomas)	July 3, 1912	78	
Richard John Cartwright	Liberal	Ontario (Oxford)	September 24, 1912	76	
Adam Carr Bell	Conservative	Nova Scotia (Pictou)	October 30, 1912	64	
Archibald Campbell	Liberal	Ontario (Toronto West)	January 15, 1913	67	
James McMullen	Liberal	Ontario (North Wellington)	March 18, 1913	79	
Richard William Scott	Liberal	Ontario (Ottawa)	April 23, 1913	88	
George Albertus Cox	Liberal	Ontario (Saugeen)	January 16, 1914	73	
George William Ross	Liberal	Ontario (Middlesex)	March 7, 1914	72	
William Gibson	Liberal	Ontario (Middlesex)	May 4, 1914	64	
Thomas Coffey	Liberal	Ontario (London)	June 8, 1914	70	
Donald McMillan	Liberal	Ontario (Alexandria)	July 26, 1914	79	
Robert Jaffray	Liberal	Ontario (Toronto)	December 16, 1913	82	
John Nesbitt Kirchhoffer	Conservative	Manitoba (Selkirk)	December 22, 1914	66	
Charles Eugène Boucher de Boucherville	Conservative	Quebec (Montarville)	September 10, 1915	93	
William McKay	Conservative	Nova Scotia (Cape Breton)	November 8, 1915	68	
George Riley	Liberal	British Columbia (Victoria)	January 19, 1916	72	
Finlay McNaughton Young	Liberal	Manitoba (Killarney)	February 15, 1916	63	
Daniel Derbyshire	Liberal	Ontario (Brockville)	June 18, 1916	69	
William McDonald	Conservative	Nova Scotia (Cape Breton)	July 4, 1916	78	
Francis Theodore Frost	Liberal	Ontario (Leeds and Granville)	August 25, 1916	72	
John Costigan	Liberal	New Brunswick (Victoria)	September 29, 1916	81	
James Kirkpatrick Kerr	Liberal	Ontario (Toronto)	December 4, 1916	75	
Robert Mackay	Liberal	Quebec (Alma, Quebec )	December 25, 1916	76	
Jean-Baptiste Romuald Fiset	Liberal	Quebec (Gulf)	January 5, 1917	73	
Thomas Osborne Davis	Liberal	Saskatchewan (Prince Albert)	January 23, 1917	60	
Lyman Melvin Jones	Liberal	Ontario (Toronto)	April 15, 1917	73	
George Thomas Baird	Conservative	New Brunswick (Victoria)	April 21, 1917	69	
Henry Corby Jr.	Conservative	Ontario (Belleville)	April 23, 1917	65	
William Owens	Conservative	Quebec (Inkerman)	June 8, 1917	77	
Thomas Simpson Sproule	Conservative	Ontario (Grey)	November 10, 1917	74	
Mackenzie Bowell	Conservative	Ontario (Hastings)	December 10, 1917	93	Pneumonia
Daniel Gillmor	Liberal	New Brunswick (Saint George)	February 22, 1918	68	
Joseph Shehyn	Liberal	Quebec (The Laurentides)	July 14, 1918	88	
James Mason	Conservative	Ontario (Toronto)	July 16, 1918	74	Appendicitis
Henry Westman Richardson	Conservative	Ontario (Kingston)	October 27, 1918	63	
George Taylor	Conservative	Ontario (Leeds)	March 26, 1919	78	
Peter McLaren	Conservative	Ontario (Perth)	May 23, 1919	85	
Peter Talbot	Liberal	Alberta (Alberta)	December 6, 1919	65	
Auguste-Charles-Philippe-Robert Landry	Conservative	Quebec (Stadacona)	December 20, 1919	73	
Roderick Harold Clive Pringle	Conservative	Ontario (Cobourg)	May 2, 1920	49	Heart condition
William Dennis	Independent Conservative	Nova Scotia (Halifax)	July 11, 1920	64	
James Moffat Douglas	Independent Liberal	Saskatchewan (Tantallon)	August 19, 1920	81	
Joseph Benjamin Prince	Liberal	Saskatchewan (Saskatchewan)	October 26, 1920	65	
Lytton Wilmot Shatford	Conservative	British Columbia (Cobourg)	November 8, 1920	47	Stroke
Peter McSweeney	Liberal	New Brunswick (Northumberland)	February 2, 1921	78	
Adam Brown Crosby	Conservative	Nova Scotia (Halifax)	March 10, 1921	61	
James Domville	Liberal	New Brunswick (Rothesay)	July 30, 1921	78	
Lawrence Geoffrey Power	Liberal	Nova Scotia (Halifax)	September 12, 1921	80	
William Cameron Edwards	Liberal	Ontario (Russell)	September 17, 1921	77	
Frederic Nicholls	Conservative	Ontario (Toronto)	October 25, 1921	64	
Thomas Wilson Crothers	Conservative	Ontario (Ontario)	December 10, 1921	71	
Arthur Boyer	Liberal	Quebec (Rigaud)	January 24, 1922	70	
Robert Beith	Liberal	Ontario (Bowmanville)	January 26, 1922	78	
John Milne	Conservative	Ontario (Hamilton)	March 4, 1922	83	
Frederick Pemberton Thompson	Liberal	New Brunswick (Fredericton)	April 27, 1922	76	
William Proudfoot	Liberal	Ontario (Huron)	December 3, 1922	63	
Joseph Godbout	Liberal	Quebec (La Salle)	April 1, 1923	72	
Amédée-Emmanuel Forget	Liberal	Alberta (Banff)	June 8, 1923	75	
William Henry Thorne	Conservative	New Brunswick (Saint John)	July 8, 1923	78	
Valentine Ratz	Liberal	Ontario (Parkhill)	March 1, 1924	75	
Joseph Bolduc	Conservative	Quebec (Lauzon)	August 13, 1924	77	
George William Fowler	Conservative	New Brunswick (Kings and Albert)	September 2, 1924	65	
Jean Léon Côté	Liberal	Alberta (Edmonton)	September 23, 1924	57	
John Yeo	Liberal	Prince Edward Island (East Prince)	December 14, 1924	90	
Patrick Charles Murphy	Conservative	Prince Edward Island (Tignish)	March 6, 1925	56	
William Humphrey Bennett	Conservative	Ontario (Simcoe East)	March 15, 1925	65	
Alexander McCall	Conservative	Ontario (Simcoe)	June 10, 1925	80	
Leverett George DeVeber	Liberal	Alberta (Lethbridge)	July 9, 1925	76	
George Henry Bradbury	Conservative	Manitoba (Selkirk)	September 6, 1925	66	
William Roche	Liberal	Nova Scotia (Halifax)	October 19, 1925	83	
James Alexander Lougheed	Conservative	Alberta (Calgary)	November 2, 1925	71	Pneumonia
William Mitchell	Liberal	Quebec (Wellington)	May 10, 1926	75	
Alfred Thibaudeau	Liberal	Quebec (De la Vallière)	August 15, 1926	65	
Laurent-Olivier David	Liberal	Quebec (Mille Isles)	August 24, 1926	86	
Richard Blain	Conservative	Ontario (Peel)	November 27, 1926	68	
George McHugh	Liberal	Ontario (Victoria)	November 28, 1926	81	
Frederick Forsyth Pardee	Liberal	Ontario (Lambton)	February 4, 1927	60	
Hippolyte Montplaisir	Conservative	Quebec (Shawinigan)	June 20, 1927	88	
Robert Alexander Mulholland	Conservative	Ontario (Port Hope)	October 1, 1927	67	
Archibald Blake McCoig	Liberal	Ontario (Kent)	November 21, 1927	54	
Gustave Benjamin Boyer	Liberal	Quebec (Rigaud)	December 2, 1927	56	
Henry Joseph Cloran	Liberal	Quebec (Victoria)	February 28, 1928	72	
George Gerald King	Liberal	New Brunswick (Queen's)	April 28, 1928	91	
John Webster	Conservative	Ontario (Brockville)	December 1, 1928	72	
William Benjamin Ross	Conservative	Nova Scotia (Middleton)	January 10, 1929	73	
Robert Watson	Liberal	Manitoba (Portage la Prairie)	May 19, 1929	76	
Albert Edward Kemp	Conservative	Ontario (Toronto)	August 12, 1929	71	
John Dowsley Reid	Conservative	Ontario (Grenville)	August 26, 1929	70	
Napoléon Kemner Laflamme	Liberal	Quebec (Mille Isles)	October 10, 1929	63	
Benjamin Charles Prowse	Liberal	Prince Edward Island (Charlottetown)	February 22, 1930	67	
Georges-Casimir Dessaulles	Liberal	Quebec (Rougemont)	April 19, 1930	102	
Hewitt Bostock	Liberal	British Columbia (Kamloops)	April 28, 1930	65	
John Gillanders Turriff	Liberal	Saskatchewan (Assiniboia)	November 10, 1930	74	
Prosper-Edmond Lessard	Liberal	Alberta (Saint Paul)	April 11, 1931	58	
George Green Foster	Conservative	Quebec (Alma)	May 1, 1931	71	
Edward Matthew Farrell	Liberal	Nova Scotia (Liverpool)	August 6, 1931	77	
Sanford Johnston Crowe	Liberal	British Columbia (Burrard)	August 23, 1931	63	
Nathaniel Curry	Conservative	Nova Scotia (Amherst)	October 23, 1931	80	
George Eulas Foster	Conservative	Ontario (Toronto)	December 30, 1931	84	
Joseph-Hormisdas Legris	Liberal	Quebec (Repentigny)	March 6, 1932	81	
Edward Lavin Girroir	Conservative	Nova Scotia (Antigonish)	May 8, 1932	60	
Wellington Bartley Willoughby	Conservative	Saskatchewan (Moose Jaw)	August 1, 1932	72	Throat cancer
Napoléon Antoine Belcourt	Liberal	Ontario (Ottawa)	August 7, 1932	71	
Andrew Haydon	Liberal	Ontario (Ottawa)	November 10, 1932	65	
James Hamilton Ross	Liberal	Saskatchewan (Regina)	December 14, 1932	76	
Irving Randall Todd	Conservative	New Brunswick (Milltown)	December 27, 1932	71	
John Waterhouse Daniel	Conservative	New Brunswick (Saint John City)	January 11, 1933	87	
Jacques Bureau	Liberal	Quebec (La Salle)	January 23, 1933	72	
Philippe-Jacques Paradis	Liberal	Quebec (Shawinigan)	June 20, 1933	64	
Gideon Decker Robertson	Conservative	Ontario (Welland)	August 25, 1933	58	
Frédéric Liguori Béique	Liberal	Quebec (De Salaberry)	September 12, 1933	88	
Pascal Poirier	Conservative	New Brunswick (L'Acadie)	September 25, 1933	81	
John Henry Fisher	Conservative	Ontario (Brant)	December 1, 1933	78	
Jules Tessier	Liberal	Quebec (De La Durantaye)	January 6, 1934	81	
John Stanfield	Conservative	Nova Scotia (Colchester)	January 22, 1934	65	
Robert Forke	Liberal Progressive	Manitoba (Brandon)	February 2, 1934	73	
Lawrence Alexander Wilson	Liberal	Quebec (Rigaud)	March 3, 1934	70	
James Palmer Rankin	Liberal	Ontario (Perth North)	June 15, 1934	79	
Paul Lacombe Hatfield	Liberal	Nova Scotia (Yarmouth)	January 28, 1935	61	
Henri Sévérin Béland	Liberal	Quebec (Lauzon)	April 22, 1935	65	
Peter Francis Martin	Conservative	Nova Scotia (Halifax)	May 2, 1935	79	
John Lewis	Liberal	Ontario (East Toronto)	May 18, 1935	77	
Frederick Laurence Schaffner	Conservative	Manitoba (Souris)	May 22, 1935	79	
Charles Murphy	Liberal	Ontario (Russell)	November 24, 1935	72	
John McLean	Conservative	Prince Edward Island (Souris)	February 20, 1936	89	
John McCormick	Conservative	Nova Scotia (Sydney Mines)	February 21, 1936	77	
Émile Fortin	Conservative	Quebec (De La Durantaye)	May 18, 1936	58	Pneumonia, heart attack
Charles McDonald	Liberal	British Columbia (British Columbia)	October 6, 1936	68-69	
Richard Smeaton White	Conservative	Quebec (Inkerman)	December 17, 1936	71	
Horatio Clarence Hocken	Conservative	Ontario (Toronto)	February 18, 1937	79	
Rodolphe Lemieux	Liberal	Quebec (Rougemont)	September 28, 1937	70	
James Arthurs	Conservative	Ontario (Ontario)	October 7, 1937	71	
Aimé Bénard	Conservative	Quebec (Saint-Boniface)	January 8, 1938	64	
Alfred Ernest Fripp	Conservative	Ontario (Ottawa)	March 25, 1938	71	
Edmund William Tobin	Liberal	Quebec (Victoria)	June 24, 1938	72	
Albert Joseph Brown	Conservative	Quebec (Wellington)	November 16, 1938	77	
Joseph Philippe Baby Casgrain	Liberal	Quebec (De Lanaudière)	January 6, 1939	82	
James Houston Spence	Liberal	Ontario (North Bruce)	February 21, 1939	71	
Frank Patrick O'Connor	Liberal	Ontario (Scarborough Junction)	August 21, 1939	54	
John Stewart McLennan	Conservative	Nova Scotia (Sydney)	September 15, 1939	85	
Archibald Hayes Macdonell	Conservative	Ontario (Toronto South)	November 12, 1939	71	
Archibald Beaton Gillis	Conservative	Saskatchewan (Saskatchewan)	January 19, 1940	75	
George Lynch-Staunton	Conservative	Ontario (Hamilton)	March 19, 1940	81	
Charles Bourgeois	Conservative	Quebec (Shawinigan)	May 15, 1940	60	
Guillaume-André Fauteux	Conservative	Quebec (De Salaberry)	September 10, 1940	65	
Henry Willoughby Laird	Conservative	Saskatchewan (Saskatchewan)	September 30, 1940	72	
James Joseph Hughes	Liberal	Prince Edward Island (King's)	March 5, 1941	84	
James Davis Taylor	Conservative	British Columbia (New Westminster)	May 11, 1941	77	
David Ovide L'Espérance	Conservative	Quebec (Gulf)	August 31, 1941	77	
Lendrum McMeans	Conservative	Manitoba (Winnipeg)	September 13, 1941	82	Injuries from a fall
Lorne Campbell Webster	Conservative	Quebec (Stadacona)	September 27, 1941	69	
John Campbell Elliott	Liberal	Ontario (Middlesex)	December 20, 1941	69	
Henry Herbert Horsey	Liberal	Ontario (Prince Edward)	January 6, 1942	70	
George Gordon	Conservative	Ontario (Nipissing)	February 3, 1942	76	
Raoul Dandurand	Liberal	Quebec (De Lorimier)	March 11, 1942	80	
Edgar Nelson Rhodes	Conservative	Nova Scotia (Amherst)	March 15, 1942	65	
Joseph Hormisdas Rainville	Conservative	Quebec (Repentigny)	April 14, 1942	67	
William Henry Sharpe	Conservative	Manitoba (Manitou)	April 19, 1942	74	
Georges Parent	Conservative	Quebec (Kennebec)	December 14, 1942	62	
George Perry Graham	Liberal	Ontario (Eganville)	January 1, 1943	83	
Louis Côté	Conservative	Ontario (Ottawa East)	February 2, 1943	52	Heart attack
Jules-Édouard Prévost	Liberal	Quebec (Mille Isles)	October 10, 1943	71	
Pierre Édouard Blondin	Progressive-Conservative	Quebec (The Laurentides)	October 29, 1943	68	
Edgar Sydney Little	Liberal	Ontario (London)	December 22, 1943	58	Heart attack, stroke
Creelman McArthur	Liberal	Prince Edward Island (Prince)	December 27, 1943	69	
Arthur Sauvé	Conservative	Quebec (Rigaud)	February 6, 1944	69	
Rufus Henry Pope	Conservative	Quebec (Bedford)	May 16, 1944	86	
Benjamin Franklin Smith	Conservative	New Brunswick (Victoria-Carleton)	May 20, 1944	79	
Clifford William Robinson	Liberal	New Brunswick (Moncton)	July 27, 1944	77	
Onésiphore Turgeon	Liberal	New Brunswick (Gloucester)	November 14, 1944	95	
Hance James Logan	Liberal	Nova Scoria (Cumberland)	December 26, 1944	75	
William Antrobus Griesbach	Conservative	Alberta (Edmonton)	January 21, 1945	67	Heart attack
Frank Bunting Black	Conservative	New Brunswick (Westmorland)	February 28, 1945	76	
John Alexander Macdonald	Conservative	Nova Scotia (Richmond West-Cape Breton)	June 11, 1945	62	
Charles Elliott Tanner	Conservative	Nova Scotia (Pictou)	January 13, 1946	88	
Duncan McLean Marshall	Liberal	Ontario (Peel)	January 16, 1946	73	
Alexander Duncan McRae	Conservative	British Columbia (Vancouver)	June 26, 1946	71	
Joseph Amable Thomas Chapais	Conservative	Quebec (Grandville)	July 15, 1946	88	
Robert Francis Green	Conservative	British Columbia (Kootenay)	October 5, 1946	86	
Edward Michener	Conservative	Alberta (Alberta)	June 16, 1947	77	
Gerald Grattan McGeer	Liberal	British Columbia (Vancouver-Burrard)	August 11, 1947	59	
William James Harmer	Liberal	Alberta (Edmonton)	September 9, 1947	74	
Walter Edward Foster	Liberal	New Brunswick (Saint John)	November 14, 1947	74	
John Joseph Bench	Liberal	Ontario (Lincoln)	December 9, 1947	42	Heart attack
Jean-Louis Philip Robicheau	Conservative	Nova Scotia (Digby-Clare)	March 1, 1948	73	
John Patrick Molloy	Liberal	Manitoba (Provencher)	March 16, 1948	75	
Daniel Edward Riley	Liberal	Alberta (Alberta)	April 27, 1948	87	
John Frederick Johnston	Liberal	Saskatchewan (Central Saskatchewan)	May 9, 1948	71	
James Donnelly	Progressive-Conservative	Ontario (South Bruce)	October 20, 1948	81	
Gerald Verner White	Conservative	Ontario (Pembroke)	October 24, 1948	69	
John Alexander Macdonald	Conservative	Prince Edward Island (Cardigan)	November 15, 1948	74	
John Anthony McDonald	Independent	New Brunswick (Shediac)	December 12, 1948	72	
Donald Sutherland	Progressive-Conservative	Ontario (Oxford)	January 1, 1949	85	
Charles-Philippe Beaubien	Progressive-Conservative	Quebec (Montarville)	January 17, 1949	78	
Brewer Waugh Robinson	Liberal	Prince Edward Island (Summerside)	January 20, 1949	58	
James Murdock	Liberal	Ontario (Parkdale)	May 15, 1949	77	
Ian Alistair Mackenzie	Liberal	British Columbia (Vancouver Centre)	September 2, 1949	59	
George Joseph Penny	Liberal	Newfoundland and Labrador (Newfoundland)	December 4, 1949	52	Bronchial pneumonia
Arthur Bliss Copp	Liberal	New Brunswick (Westmorland)	December 5, 1949	79	
John Ewen Sinclair	Liberal	Prince Edward Island (Queen's)	December 23, 1949	69	

== House of Commons ==
Member	Party	Province/Riding	Date of death	Age at death (years)	Cause
George Hope Bertram	Liberal	Ontario (Toronto Centre)	March 20, 1900	53	
Allen Haley	Liberal	Nova Scotia (Hants)	April 23, 1900	56	
Richard Tyrwhitt	Conservative	Ontario (Simcoe South)	June 22, 1900	55	
John William Bell	Conservative	Ontario (Addington)	July 5, 1901	63	
Nathaniel Clarke Wallace	Conservative	Ontario (York West)	October 8, 1901	57	
Richard Reid Dobell	Liberal	Quebec (Quebec West)	January 11, 1902	65	Head injury following a fall from a horse
Edward Henry Horsey	Liberal	Ontario (Grey North)	July 23, 1902	35	Skull fracture caused by an industrial accident
Thomas Christie	Liberal	Quebec (Argenteuil)	August 5, 1902	68	
George Ritchie Maxwell	Liberal	British Columbia (Burrard)	November 17, 1902	45	Intestinal cancer
Angus McLeod	Conservative	Ontario (Ontario North)	November 18, 1902	45	
Donald Farquharson	Liberal	Prince Edward Island (West Queen's)	June 26, 1903	68	
Pierre-Raymond-Léonard Martineau	Liberal	Quebec (Montmagny)	August 31, 1903	46	
Henry Cargill	Conservative	Ontario (Bruce East)	October 1, 1903	65	
Oliver Simmons	Conservative	Ontario (Lambton East)	November 11, 1903	68	
William Forsythe McCreary	Liberal	Manitoba (Selkirk)	May 4, 1904	48	Heart disease
John McIntosh	Conservative	Quebec (Town of Sherbrooke)	July 12, 1904	62	
Isidore Proulx	Liberal	Ontario (Prescott)	July 28, 1904	64	
Jean-Baptiste Blanchet	Liberal	Quebec (Saint Hyacinthe)	August 31, 1904	61-62	
Edward Frederick Clarke	Conservative	Ontario (West Toronto)	March 3, 1905	54	Heart failure, pneumonia
Louis Julien Demers	Liberal	Quebec (Lévis)	April 29, 1905	56	
James Sutherland	Liberal	Ontario (Oxford North)	May 3, 1905	55	
Thomas George Johnston	Liberal	Ontario (Lambton West)	July 4, 1905	55	
Raymond Préfontaine	Liberal	Quebec (Terrebonne)	December 25, 1905	55	Angina pectoris
Peter White	Conservative	Ontario (Renfrew North)	May 3, 1906	67	
Leonard Thomas Bland	Conservative	Ontario (Bruce North)	August 19, 1906	54	
Romuald-Charlemagne Laurier	Liberal	Quebec (L'Assomption)	December 28, 1906	54	
Edward Cochrane	Conservative	Ontario (Northumberland East)	March 8, 1907	73	
Thomas Martin	Liberal	Ontario (Wellington North)	March 12, 1907	56	
Alfred Augustus Stockton	Conservative	New Brunswick (City and County of Saint John)	March 15, 1907	64	
Henry Lovell	Liberal	Quebec (Stanstead)	December 4, 1907	79	
Benjamin B. Gunn	Conservative	Ontario (Huron South)	December 9, 1907	47	
Angus MacLennan	Liberal	Nova Scotia (Inverness)	August 27, 1908	64	Stroke
Wilbert McIntyre	Liberal	Alberta (Strathcona)	July 21, 1909	42	
John Barr	Conservative	Ontario (Dufferin)	November 19, 1909	66	
Edward Kidd	Conservative	Ontario (Carleton)	September 16, 1912	63	
John Graham Haggart	Conservative	Ontario (Lanark South)	March 13, 1913	76	
James Pollock Brown	Liberal	Quebec (Châteauguay)	May 30, 1913	72	
Peter Elson	Conservative	Ontario (Middlesex East)	June 11, 1913	74	
Henry Emmerson	Liberal	New Brunswick (Albert)	July 9, 1914	60	
Thomas Beattie	Conservative	Ontario (London)	December 2, 1914	70	
George Adam Clare	Conservative	Ontario (Waterloo South)	January 9, 1915	60	
James William Richards	Liberal	Prince Edward Island (Prince)	March 9, 1915	64	
Samuel Barker	Conservative	Ontario (Hamilton East)	June 26, 1915	76	
James Reid	Liberal	New Brunswick (Restigouche)	November 15, 1915	76	
Edward Arthur Lancaster	Conservative	Ontario (Lincoln)	January 4, 1916	55	
Bowman Brown Law	Liberal	Nova Scotia (Yarmouth)	February 3, 1916	60	Died in a fire that destroyed the Canadian Parliament building
George Harold Baker	Conservative	Quebec (Brome)	June 2, 1916	38	Killed in action during the Battle of Mount Sorrel in World War I
Charles Henry Lovell	Liberal	Quebec (Stanstead)	October 17, 1916	61	
William Gray	Conservative	Ontario (London)	December 12, 1916	54	
Thomas Chase Casgrain	Conservative	Quebec (Quebec County)	December 29, 1916	64	
Oliver James Wilcox	Conservative	Ontario (Essex North)	December 2, 1917	48	
Adelbert Edward Hanna	Unionist	Ontario (Lanark)	February 27, 1918	54	
John McMartin	Unionist	Ontario (Glengarry and Stormont)	April 12, 1918	59	
Samuel Simpson Sharpe	Unionist	Ontario (Ontario North)	May 25, 1918	45	Suicide induced by post-traumatic stress disorder during World War I - jumped off a window
Wilfrid Laurier	Liberal	Quebec (Quebec East)	February 17, 1919	77	Stroke
Joseph Read	Liberal	Prince Edward Island (Prince)	April 6, 1919	69	
Francis Cochrane	Conservative	Ontario (Timiskaming)	September 22, 1919	66	
Louis-Audet Lapointe	Liberal	Quebec (Saint James)	February 7, 1920	59	
David Marshall	Conservative	Ontario (Elgin East)	February 14, 1920	73	
Oscar Gladu	Liberal	Quebec (Yamaska)	December 25, 1920	50	
Harry Fulton McLeod	Unionist	New Brunswick (York-Sunbury)	January 7, 1921	49	
Arthur Sifton	Unionist	Alberta (Medicine Hat)	January 21, 1921	62	
Thomas George Wallace	Unionist	Ontario (York West)	February 20, 1921	41	
Samuel Hughes	Unionist	Ontario (Victoria)	August 24, 1921	68	Pernicious anemia
Emmanuel Berchmans Devlin	Liberal	Quebec (Wright)	August 30, 1921	48	
Robert Lorne Richardson	Unionist	Manitoba (Springfield)	November 6, 1921	61	
Peter Robert McGibbon	Liberal	Quebec (Argenteuil)	December 18, 1921	67	
John Alexander Stewart	Unionist	Ontario (Lanark)	October 7, 1922	54-55	
David Arthur Lafortune	Liberal	Quebec (Montcalm)	October 19, 1922	74	
Edward Blackadder	Liberal	Nova Scotia (Halifax)	October 22, 1922	48	
William Costello Kennedy	Liberal	Ontario (Essex North)	January 17, 1923	54	
Auguste Théophile Léger	Liberal	New Brunswick (Kent)	October 28, 1923	71	
John Armstrong MacKelvie	Conservative	British Columbia (Yale)	June 4, 1924	58	
John Morrissy	Liberal	New Brunswick (Northumberland)	July 31, 1924	66	
Charles Arthur Gauvreau	Liberal	Quebec (Témiscouata)	October 9, 1924	64	
Aylmer Byron Hunt	Liberal	Quebec (Compton)	May 4, 1925	61	
Thomas Henry Thompson	Conservative	Ontario (Hastings East)	May 17, 1925	58	
John Douglas Fraser Drummond	Progressive	Ontario (Middlesex West)	May 24, 1925	58	
William Bunting Snowball	Liberal	New Brunswick (Northumberland)	September 27, 1925	60	
Edmond Savard	Liberal	Quebec (Chicoutimi-Saguenay)	October 22, 1925	62	
Joseph Edmond Marcile	Liberal	Quebec (Bagot)	November 5, 1925	71	
Georges Henri Boivin	Liberal	Quebec (Shefford)	August 7, 1926	43	
John Carey Douglas	Conservative	Nova Scotia (Antigonish-Guysborough)	December 10, 1926	52	
John Warwick King	Progressive	Ontario (Huron North)	January 14, 1927	70	Heart attack
James Kidd Flemming	Conservative	New Brunswick (Victoria-Carleton)	February 10, 1927	58	
William Goodison	Liberal	Ontario (Lambton West)	December 3, 1928	52	Complications from surgery
Richard Franklin Preston	Conservative	Ontario (Lanark)	February 8, 1929	68	
John Wesley Edwards	Conservative	Ontario (Frontenac)	April 18, 1929	63	
Roch Lanctôt	Liberal	Quebec (Laprairie-Napierville)	May 30, 1929	63	
James Robb	Liberal	Quebec (Châteauguay-Huntingdon)	November 11, 1929	70	
Georges Dorèze Morin	Liberal	Quebec (Bagot)	December 24, 1929	45	
Joseph-Éloi Fontaine	Liberal	Quebec (Hull)	June 11, 1930	64	
George Rennie	Conservative	Ontario (Hamilton East)	October 13, 1930	64	Double pneumonia
Arthur Bettez	Liberal	Quebec (Three Rivers and Saint Maurice)	January 4, 1931	59	
John Francis Buckley	Liberal	Alberta (Athabaska)	November 27, 1931	40	Car accident
Clément Robitaille	Liberal	Quebec (Maisonneuve)	January 16, 1932	58	
Thomas McMillan	Liberal	Ontario (Huron South)	June 7, 1932	68	
Maxime Cormier	Conservative	New Brunswick (Restigouche-Madawaska)	January 14, 1933	54	
Thomas Merritt Cayley	Liberal	Ontario (Oxford South)	May 30, 1933	54	
Edmond Baird Ryckman	Conservative	Ontario (Toronto East)	January 11, 1934	67	
Thomas Herbert Lennox	Conservative	Ontario (York North)	May 3, 1934	64	
William Spankie	Conservative	Ontario (Frontenac—Addington)	May 27, 1934	74	
William Anderson Black	Conservative	Nova Scotia (Halifax)	September 1, 1934	86	
Walter Davy Cowan	Conservative	Saskatchewan (Long Lake)	September 28, 1934	68	
Joseph-Arthur Denis	Liberal	Quebec (Saint Denis)	October 1, 1934	53	
George Brecken Nicholson	Conservative	Ontario (Algoma East)	January 1, 1935	66	Stroke
Armand Renaud Lavergne	Conservative	Quebec (Montmagny)	March 5, 1935	55	
Joseph-Alexandre Mercier	Liberal	Quebec (Laurier-Outremont)	July 16, 1935	60	
D'Arcy Plunkett	Conservative	British Columbia (Victoria)	May 3, 1936	64	Pneumonia
Fizalam-William Perras	Liberal	Quebec (Wright)	June 28, 1936	60	
Peter Veniot	Liberal	New Brunswick (Gloucester)	July 6, 1936	72	
Charles Marcil	Liberal	Quebec (Bonaventure)	January 29, 1937	76	
Herbert Earl Wilton	Conservative	Ontario (Hamilton West)	February 1, 1937	67	
Matthew McKay	Liberal	Ontario (Renfrew North)	February 14, 1937	78	Influenza, pneumonia
Daniel Alexander Cameron	Liberal	Nova Scotia (Cape Breton North and Victoria)	September 4, 1937	66	
Simon Fraser Tolmie	Conservative	British Columbia (Victoria)	October 13, 1937	70	
Joseph-Achille Verville	Liberal	Quebec (Lotbinière)	November 20, 1937	50	
George Halsey Perley	Conservative	Quebec (Argenteuil)	January 4, 1938	80	
William Ryan	Liberal	New Brunswick (Saint Albert)	January 4, 1938	50	
William Samuel Hall	Social Credit Party	Alberta (Edmonton East)	January 26, 1938	66	
Peter Sinclair Jr.	Liberal	Prince Edward Island (Queen's)	March 8, 1938	50	
Frederick Cronyn Betts	Conservative	Ontario (London)	May 7, 1938	41	
Alexander Edwards	Conservative	Ontario (Waterloo South)	June 3, 1938	62	Heart attack
Samuel William Jacobs	Liberal	Quebec (Cartier)	August 21, 1938	67	
David Wilson Beaubier	Conservative	Manitoba (Brandon)	September 1, 1938	74	
James Rutherford	Liberal	Ontario (Kent)	February 27, 1939	63	
Vital Mallette	Liberal	Quebec (Jacques Cartier)	April 17, 1939	50	
Alexander MacGillivray Young	Liberal	Saskatchewan (Saskatoon City)	July 9, 1939	60	Brain tumor
Fernand Rinfret	Liberal	Quebec (Saint James)	July 12, 1939	56	
Alfred Edgar MacLean	Liberal	Prince Edward Island (Prince)	October 28, 1939	71	
David Spence	Conservative	Ontario (Parkdale)	February 13, 1940	73	
Walter George Brown	United Reform Movement	Saskatchewan (Saskatoon City)	April 1, 1940	64	Heart attack
Alonzo Bowen Hyndman	Conservative	Ontario (Carleton)	April 9, 1940	49	
Norman McLeod Rogers	Liberal	Ontario (Kingston City)	June 10, 1940	45	Plane crash
Frederick Clayton Casselman	Liberal	Alberta (Edmonton East)	March 20, 1941	55	
Hermas Deslauriers	Liberal	Quebec (Saint Mary)	May 28, 1941	61	
Arthur Damude	Liberal	Ontario (Welland)	September 15, 1941	51	Asthma
Ernest Lapointe	Liberal	Quebec (Quebec East)	November 26, 1941	65	
J.S. Woodsworth	Co-operative Commonwealth Federation	Manitoba (Winnipeg North Centre)	March 21, 1942	67	Stroke
Harry Raymond Fleming	Liberal	Saskatchewan (Humboldt)	November 5, 1942	48	
Peter Bercovitch	Liberal	Quebec (Cartier)	December 27, 1942	63	
Hugh Bathgate McKinnon	Liberal	Ontario (Kenora-Rainy River)	April 10, 1944	58	
Eugène Durocher	Liberal	Quebec (Saint James)	May 10, 1944	62	
Joseph Alphée Poirier	Liberal	Quebec (Bonaventure)	September 19, 1944	45	
John Mouat Turner	Liberal	Manitoba (Springfield)	February 24, 1945	44	Heart attack
Wallace McDonald	Liberal	Quebec (Pontiac)	May 2, 1946	69	
Harry Leader	Liberal	Manitoba (Portage la Prairie)	May 9, 1946	66	
Alexander James Anderson	Conservative	Ontario (Toronto-High Park)	June 3, 1946	82	
Arthur Cardin	Liberal	Quebec (Richelieu-Verchères)	October 20, 1946	67	
William Chisholm Macdonald	Liberal	Nova Scotia (Halifax)	November 19, 1946	56	
Hedley Francis Gregory Bridges	Liberal	Nova Scotia (York-Sunbury)	August 10, 1947	45	
W.E.N. Sinclair	Liberal	Ontario (Ontario)	November 26, 1947	74	
Lucien Dubois	Liberal	Quebec (Nicolet)	November 8, 1948	55	
Norman Jaques	Social Credit Party	Alberta (Wetaskiwin)	January 31, 1949	68	Heart attack
Moses Elijah McGarry	Liberal	Nova Scotia (Inverness-Richmond)	June 11, 1949	71	
John Ernest McMillin	Progressive-Conservative	Ontario (Greenwood)	August 21, 1949	64-65	Heart attack
Benoît Michaud	Liberal	New Brunswick (Restigouche-Madawaska)	August 29, 1949	47	

== See also ==
- List of members of the Canadian Parliament who died in office (1867–1899)
- List of members of the Canadian Parliament who died in office (1950–1999)
- List of members of the Canadian Parliament who died in office (2000–)
