= List of members of the Parliament of Canada who died in office (1950–1999) =

The following is a list of members of the Canadian Parliament who died while they were serving their terms from 1950 to 1999.

== Senate ==
Member	Party	Province/Division	Date of death	Age at death (years)	Cause
Édouard-Charles St-Père	Liberal	Quebec (De Lanaudière)	January 31, 1950	73	
Joseph Arthur Lesage	Liberal	Quebec (Gulf)	March 9, 1950	68	
Antoine Joseph Léger	Progressive Conservative	New Brunswick (L'Acadie)	April 7, 1950	69	
George Burpee Jones	Progressive Conservative	New Brunswick (New Brunswick)	April 27, 1950	84	
Charles Ballantyne	Progressive Conservative	Ontario (Alma)	October 19, 1950	83	
Eugène Paquet	Progressive Conservative	Quebec (Lauzon)	May 8, 1951	83	
Lucien Moraud	Progressive Conservative	Quebec (La Salle)	May 29, 1951	66	
Robert William Gladstone	Liberal	Ontario (Wellington South)	June 1, 1951	71	Heart condition
Allen Bristol Aylesworth	Liberal	Ontario (North York)	February 13, 1952	97	
Thomas-Jean Bourque	Conservative	New Brunswick (Richibucto)	February 16, 1952	87	
Herman William Quinton	Liberal	Newfoundland and Labrador (Burgeo-La Poile)	April 2, 1952	55	
James Gordon Fogo	Liberal	Ontario (Carleton)	July 6, 1952	55	
Joseph-Henri-Gustave Lacasse	Liberal	Ontario (Essex)	January 18, 1953	62	
Louis-Athanase David	Liberal	Quebec (Saurel)	January 26, 1953	70	
James Joseph Hayes Doone	Liberal	New Brunswick (Charlotte)	April 6, 1953	64	
William Duff	Liberal	Nova Scotia (Lunenburg)	April 25, 1953	80	Heart attack
Donald MacLennan	Liberal	Nova Scotia (Margaree Forks)	October 19, 1953	76	
John Caswell Davis	Liberal	Manitoba (Winnipeg)	October 25, 1953	65	
Vincent Burke	Liberal	Newfoundland and Labrador (Saint-Jacques)	December 19, 1953	75	
William Henry Dennis	Progressive Conservative	Nova Scotia (Halifax)	January 18, 1954	66	
William James Hushion	Liberal	Quebec (Victoria)	January 29, 1954	70	
John Walter Jones	Liberal	Prince Edward Island (Queen's)	March 31, 1954	75	
Henry Read Emmerson	Liberal	New Brunswick (Dorchester)	June 21, 1954	70	
William Ashbury Buchanan	Liberal	Alberta (Lethbridge)	July 8, 1954	78	Malignant tumor
Élie Beauregard	Liberal	Quebec (Rougemont)	August 27, 1954	70	
Joseph Raoul Hurtubise	Liberal	Ontario (Nipissing)	January 31, 1955	72	
Joseph-Fernand Fafard	Liberal	Quebec (De la Durantaye)	May 14, 1955	72	
James Horace King	Liberal	British Columbia (Kootenay East)	July 14, 1955	82	
Pamphile Réal Du Tremblay	Liberal	Quebec (Repentigny)	October 6, 1955	76	
Iva Campbell Fallis	Progressive Conservative	Ontario (Peterborough)	March 7, 1956	72	
James Alexander Calder	Progressive Conservative	Saskatchewan (Moose Jaw)	July 20, 1956	87	
John Thomas Hackett	Progressive Conservative	Quebec (Victoria)	September 15, 1956	72	
Joseph Adélard Godbout	Liberal	Quebec (Montarville)	September 18, 1956	63	
John James Stevenson	Liberal	Saskatchewan (Prince Albert)	September 21, 1956	83	
George Henry Ross	Liberal	Alberta (Calgary)	September 26, 1956	77	
Frederick William Pirie	Liberal	New Brunswick (Victoria-Carleton)	October 3, 1956	63	
Joseph James Duffus	Liberal	Ontario (Peterborough West)	February 7, 1957	80	
Armand Daigle	Liberal	Quebec (Mille Isles)	March 8, 1957	64	
James Peter McIntyre	Liberal	Prince Edward Island (Mount Stewart)	April 8, 1957	73	
William Henry McGuire	Liberal	Ontario (East York)	October 31, 1957	84	
James Angus MacKinnon	Liberal	Alberta (Edmonton)	April 18, 1958	76	
Charles G. Hawkins	Liberal	Nova Scotia (Milford-Hants)	August 14, 1958	70	
Arthur Marcotte	Conservative	Saskatchewan (Ponteix)	August 18, 1958	85	
Jacob Nicol	Liberal	Quebec (Bedford)	September 23, 1958	82	
John Power Howden	Liberal	Manitoba (Saint-Boniface)	November 4, 1959	79	Stroke
Ray Petten	Liberal	Newfoundland and Labrador (Bonavista)	February 16, 1961	63	
Felix Patrick Quinn	Conservative	Nova Scotia (Bedford-Halifax)	March 28, 1961	86	
William Daum Euler	Liberal	Ontario (Waterloo)	July 15, 1961	86	
Joseph-Arthur Bradette	Liberal	Ontario (Cochrane)	September 12, 1961	74	
Aurel D. Léger	Liberal	New Brunswick (East York)	December 28, 1961	67	
William Henry Golding	Liberal	Ontario (Huron-Perth)	December 31, 1961	83	
George Hilton Barbour	Liberal	Prince Edward Island (Prince)	February 6, 1962	83	
Cairine Reay Wilson	Liberal	Ontario (Rockcliffe)	March 3, 1962	77	Heart attack
Arthur Charles Hardy	Liberal	Ontario (Leeds)	March 13, 1962	89	
John Alexander McDonald	Liberal	Nova Scotia (King's)	April 16, 1962	72	
William Brunt	Progressive Conservative	Ontario (Hanover)	July 7, 1962	59	
William Michael Wall	Liberal	Manitoba (Winnipeg)	July 7, 1962	50	
Henri Charles Bois	Liberal	Quebec (Montarville)	July 18, 1962	65	
William Alexander Fraser	Liberal	Ontario (Trenton)	October 26, 1962	76	
Télesphore-Damien Bouchard	Liberal	Quebec (The Laurentides)	November 13, 1962	80	
Donat Raymond	Liberal	Quebec (De la Vallière )	June 5, 1963	83	
John Gilbert Higgins	Progressive Conservative	Newfoundland and Labrador (Saint John's East)	July 1, 1963	72	
Clarence Vernon Emerson	Progressive Conservative	New Brunswick (Saint-John Albert)	September 25, 1963	62	
Mark Robert Drouin	Progressive Conservative	Quebec (La Salle)	October 12, 1963	59	
Calvert Coates Pratt	Liberal	Newfoundland and Labrador (Saint John's West)	November 13, 1963	75	
Duncan Kenneth MacTavish	Liberal	Ontario (Ontario)	November 15, 1963	64	Automobile collision
Gordon Peter Campbell	Liberal	Ontario (Toronto)	January 16, 1964	65	
James Gray Turgeon	Liberal	British Columbia (Cariboo)	February 14, 1964	84	
Charles Benjamin Howard	Liberal	Quebec (Wellington)	March 25, 1964	78	
Aristide Blais	Liberal	Alberta (Saint Albert)	November 10, 1964	89	
Ralph Byron Horner	Progressive Conservative	Saskatchewan (Saskatchewan North)	December 14, 1964	80	
Austin Claude Taylor	Liberal	New Brunswick (Westmorland)	January 17, 1965	71	
John Alexander Robertson	Progressive Conservative	Ontario (Kenora-Rainy River)	February 19, 1965	51	Heart attack
Norman Platt Lambert	Liberal	Ontario (Ottawa)	November 4, 1965	80	
Thomas Harold Wood	Liberal	Saskatchewan (Regina)	November 26, 1965	76	
Paul Henri Bouffard	Liberal	Quebec (Grandville)	February 16, 1966	70	
Frederick Gordon Bradley	Liberal	Newfoundland and Labrador (Bonavista-Twillingate)	March 30, 1966	80	
Stanley McKeen	Liberal	British Columbia (Vancouver)	December 1, 1966	69	
Rupert Davies	Liberal	Ontario (Kingston)	March 11, 1967	87	
Alexander Neil McLean	Liberal	New Brunswick (Southern New Brunswick)	March 12, 1967	81	
John Hnatyshyn	Progressive Conservative	Saskatchewan (Saskatoon)	May 2, 1967	60	
Vincent Dupuis	Liberal	Quebec (Rigaud)	May 11, 1967	78	
Alexander Boyd Baird	Liberal	Newfoundland and Labrador (Saint John's)	November 23, 1967	76	
Charles Gavan Power	Liberal	Quebec (Gulf)	May 30, 1968	80	
Edward Joseph Thériault	Liberal	Nova Scotia (Nova Scotia)	December 20, 1968	67	
Clement O'Leary	Progressive Conservative	Nova Scotia (Antigonish-Guysborough)	June 12, 1969	52	
Gunnar Thorvaldson	Progressive Conservative	Manitoba (Winnipeg South)	August 2, 1969	68	Heart attack
Olive Lillian Irvine	Progressive Conservative	Manitoba (Lisgar)	November 1, 1969	74	
Gustave Monette	Progressive Conservative	Quebec (Mille-Isles)	December 23, 1969	82	
John Wallace de Beque Farris	Liberal	British Columbia (Vancouver South)	February 25, 1970	91	
Earl Wallace Urquhart	Liberal	Nova Scotia (Inverness-Richmond)	August 17, 1971	50	
Arthur Roebuck	Liberal	Ontario (Toronto-Trinity)	November 17, 1971	93	
Harry Albert Willis	Progressive Conservative	Ontario (Peel)	March 23, 1972	67	
Léon Méthot	Progressive Conservative	Quebec (Shawinigan)	August 6, 1972	77	
Gordon Benjamin Isnor	Liberal	Nova Scotia (Halifax-Dartmouth)	March 17, 1973	87	
Nelson Rattenbury	Liberal	New Brunswick (Saint John)	May 27, 1973	65	
Donald A. McLean	Liberal	New Brunswick (Charlotte County)	November 5, 1973	66	
Romuald Bourque	Liberal	Quebec (De la Vallière)	August 14, 1974	84	
Thomas Joseph Kickham	Liberal	Prince Edward Island (Cardigan)	December 1, 1974	73	
Arthur Laing	Liberal	British Columbia (Vancouver South)	February 13, 1975	70	
Grattan O'Leary	Progressive Conservative	Ontario (Carleton)	April 7, 1976	88	
William Albert Boucher	Liberal	Saskatchewan (Prince Albert)	June 23, 1976	86	
James Harper Prowse	Liberal	Alberta (Alberta)	September 27, 1976	62	
John Ewasew	Liberal	Quebec (Montarville)	March 26, 1978	56	
Hervé Michaud	Liberal	New Brunswick (Kent)	June 5, 1978	65	
Joe Green	Liberal	Ontario (Niagara)	October 23, 1978	58	
Maurice Bourget	Liberal	Quebec (The Laurentides)	March 29, 1979	71	
Claude Wagner	Progressive Conservative	Quebec (Kennebec)	July 11, 1979	54	Cancer
Alexander Hamilton McDonald	Liberal	Saskatchewan (Moosimin)	March 31, 1980	61	
Josie Alice Quart	Progressive Conservative	Quebec (Victoria)	April 17, 1980	84	
Sarto Fournier	Liberal	Quebec (De Lanaudière)	July 23, 1980	72	
Raymond Eudes	Liberal	Quebec (De Lorimier)	October 25, 1980	68	
Harry William Hays	Liberal	Alberta (Calgary)	May 4, 1982	72	Complications following heart surgery
George Isaac Smith	Progressive Conservative	Nova Scotia (Colchester)	December 19, 1982	73	
Maurice Lamontagne	Liberal	Quebec (Inkerman)	June 12, 1983	65	
Daniel Aloysius Riley	Liberal	New Brunswick (Saint John)	September 13, 1984	68	
William Moore Benidickson	Liberal	Manitoba (Kenora-Rainy River)	January 4, 1985	73	
Louis-Philippe Beaubien	Progressive Conservative	Quebec (Bedford)	March 28, 1985	82	
Florence Elsie Inman	Liberal	Prince Edward Island (Murray Harbour)	May 31, 1986	94	Heart attack
Paul Yuzyk	Progressive Conservative	Manitoba (Fort Garry)	July 9, 1986	73	
Yvette Boucher Rousseau	Liberal	Quebec (De Salaberry)	March 17, 1988	71	
Paul Lafond	Liberal	Quebec (Gulf)	May 27, 1988	68	
Nancy Bell	Independent	British Columbia (Nanaimo-Malaspina)	November 29, 1989	65	
Richard Hatfield	Progressive Conservative	New Brunswick (New Brunswick)	April 26, 1991	60	Brain tumor
David Croll	Liberal	Ontario (Toronto-Spadina)	June 11, 1991	91	Heart failure
Azellus Denis	Liberal	Quebec (La Salle)	September 4, 1991	84	
Stanley Waters	Reform	Alberta (Alberta)	September 25, 1991	71	Complications following surgery
Hazen Argue	Liberal	Saskatchewan (Regina)	October 2, 1991	70	Cancer
George Van Roggen	Liberal	British Columbia (Vancouver-Points Grey)	June 8, 1992	70	Liver cancer
Rhéal Bélisle	Progressive Conservative	Ontario (Sudbury)	November 3, 1992	73	
Thomas Lefebvre	Liberal	Quebec (De Lanaudière)	November 20, 1992	65	Cancer
Nancy Teed	Progressive Conservative	New Brunswick (Saint John)	January 29, 1993	43	Car accident
Jean Noël Desmarais	Progressive Conservative	Ontario (Sudbury)	July 25, 1995	71	Cancer
Earl Hastings	Liberal	Alberta (Palliser-Foothills)	May 5, 1996	71	
John Michael Macdonald	Progressive Conservative	Nova Scotia (Cape Breton)	June 20, 1997	91	
Pietro Rizzuto	Liberal	Quebec (Repentigny)	August 3, 1997	63	
Walter Patrick Twinn	Progressive Conservative	Alberta (Alberta)	October 30, 1997	63	Heart attack
Gerald Ottenheimer	Progressive Conservative	Newfoundland and Labrador (Waterford-Trinity)	January 18, 1998	63	Cancer
Peter Bosa	Liberal	Ontario (York-Caboto)	December 10, 1998	71	
Paul Lucier	Liberal	Yukon Territory (Yukon)	July 23, 1999	68	
James Balfour	Progressive Conservative	Saskatchewan (Regina)	December 12, 1999	71	

== House of Commons ==
Member	Party	Province/Riding	Date of death	Age at death (years)	Cause
Thomas Langton Church	Progressive Conservative	Ontario (Broadview)	February 7, 1950	79-80	
Maurice Hartt	Liberal	Quebec (Cartier)	March 15, 1950	54	
Gleason Belzile	Liberal	Quebec (Rimouski)	July 25, 1950	51	
Humphrey Mitchell	Liberal	Ontario (Hamilton East)	August 1, 1950	55	
James Lester Douglas	Liberal	Prince Edward Island (Queen's)	September 30, 1950	68	
James Ewen Matthews	Liberal	Manitoba (Brandon)	November 24, 1950	81	
Karl Kenneth Homuth	Progressive Conservative	Ontario (Waterloo South)	March 15, 1951	57	Lung cancer
Heber Harold Hatfield	Progressive Conservative	New Brunswick (Victoria-Carleton)	January 3, 1952	66	
Henri Gosselin	Liberal	Quebec (Brome-Missisquoi)	January 27, 1952	63	
Joseph Henry Harris	Progressive Conservative	Ontario (Danforth)	October 24, 1952	63	
Matthew MacLean	Liberal	Nova Scotia (Cape Breton North and Victoria)	April 7, 1953	73	Complications from a medical operation
Gordon Graydon	Progressive Conservative	Ontario (Peel)	September 19, 1953	56	
Joseph-Célestin Nadon	Liberal	Quebec (Gatineau)	December 17, 1953	56	
Charles Delmer Coyle	Progressive Conservative	Ontario (Elgin)	January 19, 1954	66	
Agar Rodney Adamson	Progressive Conservative	Ontario (York West)	April 8, 1954	52	Plane crash
Lionel Conacher	Liberal	Ontario (Trinity)	May 26, 1954	54	Heart attack
Robert James Wood	Liberal	Manitoba (Norquay)	August 8, 1954	68	
Robert Fair	Social Credit Party	Alberta (Battle River)	November 1, 1954	63	
Joseph Gaspard Boucher	Liberal	New Brunswick (Restigouche-Madawaska)	April 18, 1955	58	Heart attack
Alcide Côté	Liberal	Quebec (Saint-Jean—Iberville—Napierville)	August 7, 1955	52	
Joseph William Noseworthy	Co-operative Commonwealth Federation	Ontario (York South)	March 30, 1956	67	
Lorne MacDougall	Liberal	British Columbia (Vancouver-Burrard)	June 6, 1956	57	Heart attack
Sybil Bennett	Progressive Conservative	Ontario (Halton)	November 12, 1956	52	
Thomas Hambly Ross	Liberal	Ontario (Hamilton East)	November 20, 1956	80	
Owen Trainor	Progressive Conservative	Manitoba (Winnipeg South)	November 28, 1956	62	Heart attack
Thomas Patrick Healy	Liberal	Quebec (Saint-Ann)	April 12, 1957	62	
Henry Alfred Hosking	Liberal	Ontario (Wellington South)	June 3, 1957	48	Pancreatitis
William Gourlay Blair	Progressive Conservative	Ontario (Lanark)	June 16, 1957	67	
Arza Clair Casselman	Progressive Conservative	Ontario (Grenville—Dundas)	May 11, 1958	67	
Val Yacula	Progressive Conservative	Manitoba (Springfield)	September 24, 1958	49-50	
Edward Lockyer	Progressive Conservative	Ontario (Lanark)	October 5, 1958	58	Heart disease
Sidney Earle Smith	Progressive Conservative	Ontario (Hastings—Frontenac)	March 17, 1959	62	Stroke
Joseph-Omer Gour	Liberal	Ontario (Russell)	March 24, 1959	65	
William Houck	Liberal	Ontario (Niagara Falls)	May 5, 1960	66	
Gordon Fraser	Progressive Conservative	Ontario (Peterborough West)	May 26, 1960	69	
Hayden Stanton	Progressive Conservative	Ontario (Leeds)	December 7, 1960	62	Complications following stomach surgery
John Augustine Macdonald	Progressive Conservative	Prince Edward Island (King's)	January 4, 1961	47	
William Anderson	Progressive Conservative	Ontario (Waterloo South)	June 6, 1961	55	
Mervyn Arthur Hardie	Liberal	Northwest Territories (Mackenzie River)	October 18, 1961	43	Cancer
James Stanley Speakman	Progressive Conservative	Alberta (Wetaskiwin)	April 30, 1962	55	
Leon Crestohl	Liberal	Quebec (Cartier)	March 21, 1963	62	
Henry Frank Jones	Progressive Conservative	Saskatchewan (Wetaskiwin)	March 4, 1964	43	
Jack Garland	Liberal	Ontario (Nipissing)	March 14, 1964	46	
Sherwood Rideout	Liberal	New Brunswick (Westmorland)	May 29, 1964	46	Heart attack
Gordon Chaplin	Progressive Conservative	Ontario (Waterloo South)	June 27, 1964	56	
George Clyde Nowlan	Progressive Conservative	Nova Scotia (Digby-Annapolis-Kings)	May 31, 1965	66	
Charles Wesley Lamb	Progressive Conservative	Ontario (Victoria)	July 12, 1965	74	
Alexis Caron	Liberal	Quebec (Hull)	August 31, 1966	67	
Rodger Mitchell	Liberal	Ontario (Sudbury)	January 4, 1967	68	Pulmonary fibrosis
Maurice Rinfret	Liberal	Quebec (Saint-Jacques)	December 26, 1967	52	
René Tremblay	Liberal	Quebec (Matapédia-Matane)	January 22, 1968	45	Heart attack
Colin Cameron	New Democratic Party	British Columbia (Nanaimo-Cowichan-The Islands)	July 28, 1968	71	Stroke
George Muir	Progressive Conservative	Manitoba (Lisgar)	August 26, 1970	67	
Bernard Pilon	Liberal	Quebec (Chambly-Rouvile)	November 17, 1970	52	Heart attack
Joseph-Alfred Mongrain	Liberal	Quebec (Trois-Rivières)	December 23, 1970	61	
Albert B. Douglas	Liberal	Saskatchewan (Assiniboia)	March 6, 1971	58	
Harry Kuntz	Progressive Conservative	Alberta (Battle River)	November 16, 1973	44	
Wally Nesbitt	Progressive Conservative	Ontario (Oxford)	December 21, 1973	55	Heart attack
Albanie Morin	Liberal	Quebec (Louis-Hébert)	September 30, 1976	55	
Réal Caouette	Social Credit Party	Quebec (Témiscamingue)	December 16, 1976	59	Stroke
André-Gilles Fortin	Social Credit Party	Quebec (Lotbinière)	June 24, 1977	33	Car accident
John Diefenbaker	Progressive Conservative	Saskatchewan (Prince Albert)	August 16, 1979	83	Heart attack
Daniel J. MacDonald	Liberal	Prince Edward Island (Cardigan)	September 30, 1980	62	
Bruce Lonsdale	Liberal	Ontario (Timiskaming)	January 22, 1982	32	Car accident
Thomas Cossitt	Progressive Conservative	Ontario (Leeds-Grenville)	March 15, 1982	54	Heart attack
Walter Dinsdale	Progressive Conservative	Manitoba (Brandon-Souris)	November 20, 1982	66	Kidney failure, stroke
Walter David Baker	Progressive Conservative	Ontario (Nepean—Carleton)	November 13, 1983	53	
John Kushner	Progressive Conservative	Alberta (Calgary East)	March 2, 1984	60	
John Dahmer	Progressive Conservative	Alberta (Beaver River)	November 26, 1988	51	Pancreatic cancer
Jean-Claude Malépart	Liberal	Quebec (Laurier-Sainte-Marie)	November 15, 1989	50	
Chuck Cook	Progressive Conservative	British Columbia (North Vancouver)	February 23, 1993	66	cancer
Gaston Péloquin	Bloc Québécois	Quebec (Brome-Missisquoi)	September 1, 1994	54	car accident
André Caron	Bloc Québécois	Quebec (Jonquière)	January 10, 1997	54	cancer
Shaughnessy Cohen	Liberal	Ontario (Windsor—St. Clair)	December 9, 1998	50	Cerebral hemorrhage

== See also ==
- List of members of the Canadian Parliament who died in office (1867–1899)
- List of members of the Canadian Parliament who died in office (1900–1949)
- List of members of the Canadian Parliament who died in office (2000–)
