= Legislative Council of the Province of Canada =

Upper house of the Province of Canada

Legislative Council of Canada Conseil législatif de la Province du Canada

Type
- Type: Upper house of the Parliament of the Province of Canada

History
- Founded: February 10, 1841
- Disbanded: July 1, 1867
- Preceded by: Legislative Council of Lower Canada; Legislative Council of Upper Canada
- Succeeded by: Senate of Canada (federally) none in Ontario; Legislative Council of Quebec

The Legislative Council of the Province of Canada (French: Conseil législatif de la province du Canada) was the upper house for the Province of Canada, which consisted of the former provinces of Lower Canada, then known as Canada East and later the province of Quebec, and Upper Canada, then known as Canada West and later the province of Ontario. It was created by The Union Act of 1840. With the lower house, the Legislative Assembly of the Province of Canada, the two houses constituted the Parliament of the Province of Canada.

The first session of parliament began in Kingston in Canada West in 1841. It succeeded the Legislative Council of Lower Canada and Legislative Council of Upper Canada.

The 24 legislative councillors were originally appointed for life. In 1854, the British Parliament authorized their election, and implementing legislation was passed by the Province of Canada in 1856. It was provided that:

- The present appointed councillors would continue to hold their positions until they had vacated them.
- Members were to be elected for eight-year terms from each of 48 divisions (24 in each of Canada East and Canada West).
- The order in which divisions were to be selected for elections was to be determined by lot.
- 12 members were elected every two years from 1856 to 1862.

The British North America Act, 1867 divided the Province of Canada into the provinces of Ontario and Quebec, each with representation in the unelected Senate of Canada. As a province, Ontario never created a Legislative Council; however, Quebec had its own Legislative Council until 1968. Both the provincial and federal upper houses used (and, in the case of the Senate, continues to use to the present day) the same 24 divisions for Quebec as had been used for Canada East by the Legislative Council of the Province of Canada prior to Confederation.

== List of legislative councillors ==
† = died in office ‡ = elected in byelection # = resigned from office ↑ = elected by acclamation ↓ = unseated

Member	Electoral division	Term		Appointed	Elected	Appointed post Confederation	
Member	Electoral division	Start	End	Appointed	Elected	Senate of Canada	Legislative Council of Quebec
John Hamilton	Canada West	1841	1867	✓		✓	
James Crooks	Canada West	1841	1860	✓			
William Morris	Canada West	1841	1858†	✓			
John Macaulay	Canada West	1841	1857†	✓			
Adam Fergusson	Canada West	1841	1862	✓			
Peter Boyle de Blaquière	Canada West	1841	1860†	✓			
Alexander Fraser	Canada West	1841	1853†	✓			
Thomas McKay	Canada West	1841	1855†	✓			
Robert Sympson Jameson	Canada West	1841	1853	✓			
John McDonald	Canada West	1841	1843	✓			
Robert Baldwin Sullivan	Canada West	1841	1851	✓			
René-Édouard Caron	Canada East	1841	1857	✓			
François-Pierre Bruneau	Canada East	1841	1851†	✓			
Antoine-Olivier Berthelet	Canada East	1841	1841#	✓			
Philip Henry Moore	Canada East	1841	1867	✓			
Jules-Maurice Quesnel	Canada East	1841	1842†	✓			
Gabriel Roy	Canada East	1841	1848†	✓			
Barthélemy Joliette	Canada East	1841	1850†	✓			
Peter McGill	Canada East	1841	1860†	✓			
Adam Ferrie	Canada East	1841	1863	✓			
Paul Holland Knowlton	Canada East	1841	1863†	✓			
George Pemberton	Canada East	1841	1849	✓			
Étienne Mayrand	Canada East	1841	1841#	✓			
John Fraser	Canada East	1841	1843#	✓			
Jean-Baptiste Taché	Canada East	1841	1849†	✓			
Joseph Dionne	Canada East	1842	1859	✓			
William Walker	Canada East	1842	1863†	✓			
Amable Dionne	Canada East	1842	1852†	✓			
George Jervis Goodhue	Canada West	1842	1867	✓			
Levius Peters Sherwood	Canada West	1842	1850†	✓			
Louis Massue	Canada East	1843	1851	✓			
Pierre-Amable Boucher de Boucherville	Canada East	1843	1857†	✓			
René-Joseph Kimber	Canada East	1843	1843†	✓			
Christopher Widmer	Canada West	1843	1858†	✓			
Jacob Æmilius Irving	Canada West	1843	1856†	✓			
William Henry Draper	Canada West	1843	1844	✓			
John Neilson	Canada East	1844	1848†	✓			
James Morris	Canada West	1844	1865†	✓			
James Gordon	Canada West	1845	1865†	✓			
James Ferrier	Canada East	1847	1867	✓		✓	✓
Hamnett Kirkes Pinhey	Canada West	1847	1857	✓			
Roderick Matheson	Canada West	1847	1867	✓		✓	
George Strange Boulton	Canada West	1847	1867	✓			
Denis-Benjamin Viger	Canada East	1848	1858	✓			
James Leslie	Canada East	1848	1867	✓		✓	
Étienne-Paschal Taché	Canada East	1848	1865†	✓			
Frédéric-Auguste Quesnel	Canada East	1848	1866†	✓			
Joseph Bourret	Canada East	1848	1859†	✓			
Georges-René Saveuse de Beaujeu	Canada East	1848	1865†	✓			
Louis Méthot	Canada East	1848	1857	✓			
Joseph-Ovide Turgeon	Canada East	1848	1857†	✓			
John Ross	Canada West	1848	1867	✓		✓	
Samuel Crane	Canada West	1849	1858	✓			
Samuel Sylvester Mills	Canada West	1849	1867	✓		✓	
Robert Jones	Canada East	1849	1850#	✓			
Louis Panet	Canada East	1852	1867	✓			✓
Charles Wilson	Canada East	1852	1867	✓		✓	
Narcisse-Fortunat Belleau	Canada East	1852	1867	✓			
Benjamin Seymour	Canada West	1854	1867	✓		✓	
David Morrison Armstrong	Canada East	1855	1867	✓			
Eusèbe Cartier	Canada East	1855	1862†	✓			
Joseph Légaré	Canada East	1855	1855†	✓			
Walter Hamilton Dickson	Canada West	1855	1867	✓		✓	
Ebenezer Perry	Canada West	1855	1867	✓		✓	
Marc-Pascal de Sales Laterrière	Laurentides	1856	1864		✓		
Elzéar-Henri Juchereau Duchesnay	Lauzon	1856	1867		✓	✓	
John Simpson	Queen's	1856	1867		✓	✓	
James Patton	Saugeen	1856	1862		✓		
Hollis Smith	Wellington	1856	1863†		✓		
Isidore-Édouard-Candide Masson	Thousand Islands	1856	1864		✓		
Louis Renaud	Salaberry	1856	1867		✓	✓	
Louis-Antoine Dessaulles	Rougemont	1856	1863		✓	✓	
Philip Michael Matthew Scott VanKoughnet	Rideau	1856	1862		✓		
Harmannus Smith	Burlington	1856	1864		✓		
Edmund Murney	Trent	1856	1861†		✓		
John Prince	Western	1857	1860		✓		
Joseph-François Armand	Alma	1858	1867		✓	✓	
George Crawford	St. Lawrence	1858	1867		✓	✓	
Alexander Campbell	Cataraqui	1858	1867		✓	✓	
David Christie	Erie	1858	1867		✓	✓	
Ulric-Joseph Tessier	Gulf	1858	1867		✓	✓	
Alexandre-Édouard Kierzkowski	Montarville	1858	1861↓		✓		
Jean-Baptiste Guèvremont	Sorel	1858	1867		✓	✓	
Pierre-Urgel Archambault	Repentigny	1858	1867		✓		
Édouard-Louis-Antoine-Charles Juchereau Duchesnay	La Salle	1858	1867		✓	✓	
George Alexander	Gore	1858	1867		✓	✓	
George William Allan	York	1858	1867		✓	✓	
Donald McDonald	Tecumseth	1858	1867		✓	✓	
James Shaw	Bathurst	1860	1867		✓	✓	
Robert Unwin Harwood	Rigaud	1860	1863		✓		
David Reesor	King's	1860	1867		✓	✓	
Asa Belknap Foster	Bedford	1860	1867		✓	✓	
William Hamilton Merritt	Niagara	1860	1862†		✓		
Adam Johnston Fergusson Blair	Brock	1860	1867		✓	✓	
Pierre-Gabriel Huot	Stadacona	1860	1861↓		✓	✓	
Luc Letellier de St-Just	Grandville	1860	1867		✓	✓	
John Hamilton	Inkerman	1860	1867		✓	✓	
Jean-Baptiste-Georges Proulx	La Vallière	1860	1867		✓		✓
Malcolm Cameron	St. Clair	1860	1863		✓		
Allan Napier MacNab	Western	1860	1862†		✓		
Andrew Jeffrey	Newcastle	1860	1863		✓		
Louis Lacoste	Montarville	1861‡	1867		✓	✓	
Sidney Smith	Trent	1861	1863#		✓		
François Baby	Stadacona	1861‡	1864†		✓		
James Cox Aikins	Home	1862	1867		✓	✓	
Thomas H. Bennett	Eastern	1862	1867		✓		
William McMaster	Midland	1862	1867		✓	✓	
Jacques-Olivier Bureau	Lorimier	1862	1867		✓	✓	
Elijah Leonard	Malahide	1862	1867		✓	✓	
Charles-Christophe Malhiot	Shawinigan	1862	1867		✓	✓	
François-Xavier Lemieux	La Durantaye	1862	1864†		✓		
Alexandre Bareil, dit Lajoie	Lanaudière	1862	1862†		✓		
Luther Hamilton Holton	Victoria	1862	1863		✓	✓	
Robert Read	Quinte	1862	1867		✓		
John McMurrich	Saugeen	1862‡	1864		✓	✓	
Charles Cormier	Kennebec	1862	1867		✓	✓	
James Currie	Niagara	1862	1866#		✓		
Walter McCrea	Western	1862	1867		✓	✓	
James Skead	Rideau	1862	1867		✓	✓	
Oliver Blake	Thames	1862	1867		✓	✓	
Louis Auguste Olivier	Lanaudière	1863‡	1867		✓	✓	
Alexander Vidal	St. Clair	1863	1867		✓	✓	
John Sewell Sanborn	Wellington	1863<↑	1867		✓	✓	
Thomas Ryan	Victoria	1863‡	1867		✓	✓	
Billa Flint	Trent	1863‡	1867		✓	✓	
Eustache Prud'homme	Rigaud	1863‡	1867		✓		✓
Asa Burnham	Newcastle	1863	1867		✓	✓	
William Henry Chaffers	Rougemont	1864	1867		✓	✓	
David Edward Price	Laurentides	1864	1867		✓	✓	
Joseph-Noël Bossé	La Durantaye	1864‡	1867		✓	✓	
Jean-Élie Gingras	Stadacona	1864‡	1867		✓		✓
Léandre Dumouchel	Thousand Islands	1864‡	1867		✓	✓	
David Lewis Macpherson	Saugeen	1864	1867		✓	✓	
Harcourt Burland Bull	Burlington	1864	1867		✓	✓	

== Speakers of the Legislative Council ==
The Speaker was the presiding officer of the Legislative Council, and was appointed by the Queen-in-Council. He was styled "The Honourable, the Vice-Chancellor, Speaker."

The office was preceded by the Speaker of Legislative Council of Upper Canada and Speaker of the Legislative Council of Lower Canada. The following table displays the names and political parties of the Speakers between 1841 and 1866.

Picture	Name	Party	Term	Notes
	Robert Sympson Jameson		1841-1843	First Speaker of the Legislative Council
	Peter McGill		1843-1847, 1848-1853	Mayor of Montreal from 1840 to 1842
	René-Édouard Caron		1843-1847; 1848-1853	
	James Morris		1853-1854; 1858	
	John Ross		1854-1856	
	Sir Étienne-Paschal Taché	Blue	1856-1857	
	Narcisse-Fortunat Belleau	Blue	1857-1858; 1858-1862	
	Sir Allan MacNab	Conservative	1862	
	Sir Alexander Campbell	Conservative	1863	
	Ulric-Joseph Tessier	Liberal	1863-1866	

== Parliament Buildings ==
The Legislative Council and Legislative Assembly of the Province of Canada sat a various buildings in Toronto, Kingston, Montreal, Quebec City and Ottawa:

- 1841-1843 three sessions were held at the 3 storey Kingston General Hospital
- 1843 Parliament moves to Montreal and sites at renovated St. Anne's Market; burned down in 1849; rebuilt as market only and burned down again in 1902; site later as parking lot and now public square called Place d'Youville.
- 1849 temporary sites for Parliament at Bonsecours Market and the Freemason's Hall, Montreal for single session. The Legislative Council sat once at the old Trinity Anglican Church across from Market on rue Saint Paul. Built in 1840, it was sold after the church moved to rue Gosford and sold and replaced by a building for merchant A. W. Hood in 1861 and currently used as a hotel.
- 1849-1850 Parliament returns to Toronto to the site of the Third Parliament Buildings at Front and Simcoe Street.
- 1851 Parliament relocates to Quebec City in 1851 to the Quebec Parliament Building until fire in destroys the building in 1854.
- 1854-1859 Parliament remains in Quebec and relocates to Quebec Music Hall and Quebec City Courthouse.
- 1859 Parliament return to Toronto to the site of the last parliament held there in 1849-1851 sessions.
- 1860-1865 Parliament returns to Quebec and new Parliament Buildings, Quebec at Parc Montmorency; re-used as Parliament of Quebec 1867-1883
- 1866-1867 Parliament locates in Ottawa on Parliament Hill to the completed and original Centre Block, as well as the East and West Block; Centre Block was later destroyed by fire

== See also ==
- List of by-elections to the Legislative Council of the Province of Canada
