= Robert Sympson Jameson =

Canadian politician

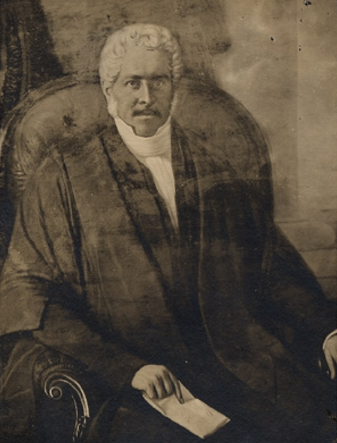

Speaker of the Legislative Council of the Province of Canada
- In office 1841–1843
- Preceded by: Office created
- Succeeded by: Peter McGill

Member of the Legislative Council of the Province of Canada - Canada West
- Incumbent
- Assumed office 1841

Member of the Legislative Assembly of Upper Canada for Leeds
- In office 1834 – 1834 (Election invalidated)
- Preceded by: Matthew Munsel Howard
- Succeeded by: Ogle Robert Gowan

Personal details
- Born: 1796 Harbridge, England
- Died: August 1, 1854 (aged 57–58) Toronto, Upper Canada
- Resting place: St. James Cemetery, Toronto (vault of friend Joseph Wells)
- Spouse: Anna Murphy 1825–1837; annulled
- Education: Middle Temple

Robert Sympson Jameson (1796 – August 1, 1854) was a lawyer and politician in Upper Canada, and later in the Province of Canada. He served as the first Speaker of the Legislative Council of the Province of Canada from 1841 to 1843.

== Early years ==
He was born at Harbridge in the English county of Hampshire in 1796 and educated in Ambleside. He studied law at the Middle Temple and was called to the English bar in 1823. He practiced in London. He married Anna Murphy, a British author, in 1825. In 1829, he was appointed Puisne judge and Chief Justice of Dominica; his wife remained in England. In 1833, he returned to London after refusing the same post in Tobago.

== Upper Canada ==
He was named Attorney General of Upper Canada in the same year and arrived in York (Toronto) in June. He was elected to the Legislative Assembly of Upper Canada for Leeds in 1834, but his election was later invalidated after an appeal; it was found that Ogle Robert Gowan's Orange supporters had intimidated voters. His wife finally joined him in 1836 but left him after less than a year. In 1837, he was named vice-chancellor of the Court of Chancery. He was appointed to the Legislative Council of the Province of Canada in 1841 and became its first speaker. He served on the councils for King's College and Trinity College. In 1842, he was named chief superintendent of education. He also was a member of literary clubs in Toronto and helped found the Toronto Society of Arts in 1847. In 1850, he retired from the Court and, in 1853, from the Legislative Council.

He died in Toronto in 1854 of tuberculosis and left his possessions to Reverend George Maynard who cared for him at the end of his life.
