= George Alexander (Canadian politician) =

Canadian politician

The Honourable George Alexander

Canadian Senator from Ontario
- In office May 30, 1873 – May 29, 1891
- Appointed by: John A. Macdonald

Personal details
- Born: May 21, 1814 Banffshire, Scotland
- Died: October 13, 1903 (aged 89)
- Party: Conservative

George Alexander (May 21, 1814 – October 13, 1903) was an Ontario farmer and political figure. He was a Conservative member of the Senate of Canada from 1873 to 1891.

== Background ==
He was born in Banffshire, Scotland in 1814 and studied at Aberdeen University. He was a director of the Bank of Upper Canada and served as president of the provincial Agricultural Association. Alexander was elected to the Legislative Council of the Province of Canada for Gore district in 1858. He was named to the Senate for Woodstock division in 1873 and resigned in 1891.
