= Elijah Leonard =

Canadian politician (1814–1891)

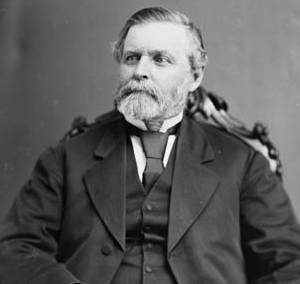
Elijah Leonard Source: Library and Archives Canada

Elijah Leonard (September 10, 1814 – May 14, 1891) was an Ontario businessman and political figure. He was a Liberal member of the Senate of Canada from 1867 to 1891.

He was born on a farm near Syracuse, New York in 1814, the son of Elijah Leonard. In 1830, he moved with his family to Normandale in Upper Canada, where his father was working at a foundry owned by Joseph Van Norman. In 1834, with his father and a partner, he established a foundry at St. Thomas. The partner was bought out and his father retired, leaving him in charge of the business.

In 1840, Leonard set up a machine shop and foundry at London, Ontario, on York street where he began to manufacture agricultural equipment and then cars, tracks and other equipment for railways. The company now known as E. Leonard and Sons, went on to manufacture steam boilers and steam-powered equipment. In 1847, he married Emeline, the daughter of Elijah Cocker Woodman. He was elected to the London municipal council in 1854 and became mayor in 1857. In 1862, he was elected to the Legislative Council of the Province of Canada for Malahide division; Leonard was named to the Senate after Confederation. Besides his manufacturing interests, he also helped found the London and Lake Huron Railway, the London Savings Bank and the Huron and Erie Savings and Loan Society.

Leonard died in London, Ontario in 1891.

After his death, his two sons continued to operate the company, which remained family-run until 1945.
