= James Shaw (Canadian politician) =

Canadian politician

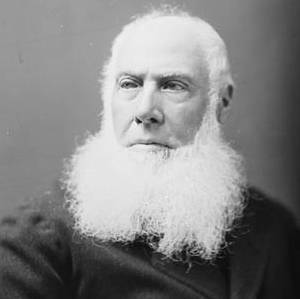
James Shaw Source: Library and Archives Canada

James Shaw (1798 – 6 February 1878) was a businessman and political figure in Canada West and Ontario.

He was born in New Ross, Ireland in 1798 and was educated in Dublin. He came to Upper Canada in 1820. He served as a clerk for the settlements at Lanark-on-Clyde and Perth and later served as an overseer during the construction of the Rideau Canal. He served in the local militias, becoming lieutenant colonel in 1860. He opened a store and blacksmith shop in Smiths Falls. In 1851, he was elected to the Legislative Assembly of the Province of Canada for Lanark; he was reelected in South Lanark in 1854 but was defeated in 1857. In 1860, he was elected to the Legislative Council and served until 1867 when he was named to the Senate of Canada. He died in Smiths Falls in 1878.
