= James Turner (Canadian politician) =

Canadian politician

James Turner (March 31, 1826 – October 10, 1889) was a Canadian merchant and political figure in Ontario. He sat for Ontario division in the Senate of Canada from 1884 to 1889.

He was born in Glasgow, Scotland, the son of John Turner and Catherine Mitchell, was educated there and came to Canada in 1848, settling in Hamilton. In 1850, Turner married Caroline Greene. He was a wholesale grocer, vice-president of the Bank of Hamilton and a director of the Northern and Pacific Junction Railway. He also served as president of the Hamilton Board of Trade and of the Hamilton and Lake Erie Railway, later amalgamated with the Hamilton and North-western Railway. Turner died in office at the age of 63.
