= Walter McCrea =

Canadian politician

Walter McCrea (November 10, 1810 – June 30, 1892) was a Liberal member of the Senate of Canada for Ontario from 1867 to 1871.

He was born near Burritt's Rapids in Lanark County, Ontario in 1810. He was called to the bar in 1850 and set up a practice in Chatham. McCrea served as captain in the local militia and was also mayor of Chatham in 1859. He was elected to the Legislative Council of the Province of Canada in 1862 representing the Western division, was appointed to the Senate in 1867 and resigned in 1871, when he was appointed judge in the Algoma District and moved to Sault Ste. Marie, Ontario. He died there in 1892.
