= Harcourt Burland Bull =

Canadian politician

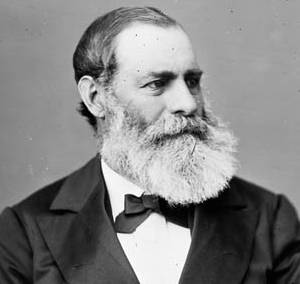
Harcourt Burland Bull Source: Library and Archives Canada

Harcourt Burland Bull (June 2, 1824 – August 12, 1881) was an Ontario journalist and political figure. He was a Conservative member of the Senate of Canada from 1879 to 1881.

== Biography ==
He was born in Dublin, Ireland in 1824, the son of George Perkins Bull. He operated the Hamilton Gazette, a newspaper founded by his father, from 1847 until it was taken over by the Hamilton Spectator during the 1850s. Bull was elected to the Legislative Council of the Province of Canada for Burlington division in 1864 and served until Confederation. He was named to the Senate in 1879.
