= Joseph Northwood =

Canadian politician

Joseph Northwood (January 11, 1809 – October 29, 1886) was an Irish-born manufacturer, merchant and political figure in Ontario, Canada. He sat for Lambton division in the Senate of Canada from 1880 to his death in 1886.

He was born in Westport, County Mayo, and came to Canada in 1832, settling in Chatham. His grandfather John Northwood is said to have caught General James Wolfe in his arms when Wolfe was fatally wounded. Northwood ran unsuccessfully for a seat in the legislative Assembly for the Province of Canada in 1864. He married Ann Wilson. Northwood served as a member of the council for the town of Chatham. He died in office in Chatham at the age of 77.
