= Samuel Sylvester Mills =

Canadian politician

The Honourable Samuel Sylvester Mills

Canadian Senator from Ontario
- In office October 23, 1867 – January 24, 1874
- Appointed by: Royal Proclamation

Member of the Legislative Council of the Province of Canada
- In office 1849–1867

Personal details
- Born: December 1, 1806 Hamilton, Upper Canada
- Died: January 24, 1874 (aged 67) Hamilton, Ontario, Canada
- Party: Conservative

Samuel Sylvester Mills (December 1, 1806 – January 24, 1874) was a Canadian businessman and politician.

== Background ==
He was born in Burlington Bay, later Hamilton, in Upper Canada in 1806. He went into the business of selling hardware, also expanding into shipping, construction, mills and real estate, and quickly became one of the richest people in the area at the time. He served on the town council for Hamilton. Mills also served as president of the Gore Bank. In 1849, he was appointed to the Legislative Council of the Province of Canada. At Confederation in 1867, he was appointed to the Senate of Canada. He died while still in office at Hamilton in 1874.

He donated land to the city of Hamilton for use as a cemetery, which later became part of Harvey Park.
