= Robert Alexander Mulholland =

Canadian politician

The Honourable Robert Alexander Mulholland

Canadian Senator from Ontario
- In office 1918–1927
- Appointed by: Robert Borden

Personal details
- Born: May 16, 1860 Alderville, Canada West
- Died: October 1, 1927 (aged 67)
- Party: Conservative

Robert Alexander Mulholland (May 16, 1860 – October 1, 1927) was an Ontario businessman and political figure. He was a Conservative member of the Senate of Canada from 1918 to 1926.

== Background ==
He was born in Alderville, Canada West in 1860, the son of Robert Mulholland. In 1887, he married Mary Juliet Craick. He managed a branch at Port Hope of the hardware and grocery business established by his father and Peter Brown. Mulholland served as mayor of Port Hope from 1910 to 1912. He was president of the Port Hope Gas Company and was chairman of the Port Hope Harbour Commission. He was named to the Senate by Prime Minister Robert Borden in 1918 and died in office in 1927.
