= Donald McDonald (Ontario politician) =

Canadian politician

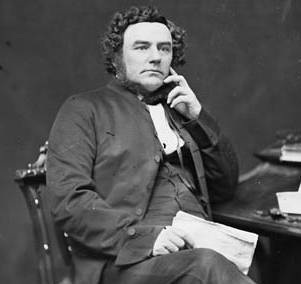
Donald McDonald Source: Library and Archives Canada

Donald McDonald (1816 – January 20, 1879) was an Ontario civil engineer, land surveyor and political figure. He was a Liberal member of the Senate of Canada from 1867 to 1879.

He was born in Caledonia, New York in 1816 and came to the Niagara region of Upper Canada with his family in 1823. The family later settled near Galt. McDonald studied at Upper Canada College and then apprenticed as a surveyor with his cousin, John Macdonald, working with the Canada Company. He joined the loyalist defenders of Toronto during the Upper Canada Rebellion. After he began suffering from rheumatism, McDonald stopped field work and worked as a clerk for the Canada Company, later being promoted to assistant commissioner. He was elected to the Legislative Council of the Province of Canada for Tecumseth division in 1858 and named to the Senate after Confederation. He served as a director and later vice-president of the Royal Canadian Bank. McDonald owned a large ranch in Kansas, where he raised shorthorn cattle.

He died in Toronto in 1879.
