= Donald Guthrie (politician) =

Canadian politician

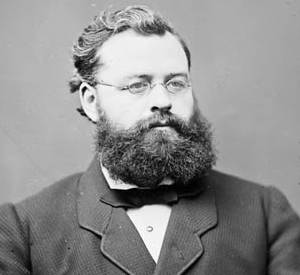

Ontario MPP
- In office 1886–1894
- Preceded by: James Laidlaw
- Succeeded by: John Mutrie
- Constituency: Wellington South

Member of Parliament for Wellington South
- In office 1876–1882
- Preceded by: David Stirton
- Succeeded by: James Innes

Personal details
- Born: May 8, 1840 Edinburgh, Scotland
- Died: October 31, 1915 (aged 75) Guelph, Ontario
- Party: Liberal
- Spouse: Eliza Margaret (m. 1863)
- Occupation: Lawyer

Donald Guthrie, KC (May 8, 1840 – October 31, 1915) was a Scottish-born Ontario lawyer and political figure. He represented Wellington South in the House of Commons of Canada as a Liberal member from 1876 to 1882 and Wellington South in the Legislative Assembly of Ontario from 1886 to 1894.

He was born in Edinburgh in 1840, the son of Hugh Guthrie and Margaret McGregor, and educated there; he moved to Canada West in 1854 and finished his education in Toronto. In 1863, he married Eliza Margaret daughter of John McVicar and Janet McTavish and a sister of Montreal Presbyterian minister Donald Harvey MacVicar. He studied law with Oliver Mowat and Adam Johnston Fergusson Blair and was called to the Ontario bar in 1866; he was later named Queen's Counsel. He set up practice at Guelph and served as solicitor for Wellington County and the city of Guelph. Guthrie also was president of the Guelph Gas Light Company. He was first elected to the House of Commons in an 1876 by-election held when David Stirton was named postmaster for Guelph. In 1895, he was named inspector of registry offices for Ontario. Guthrie died in Guelph at the age of 75.

His son Hugh also represented Wellington South in the House of Commons.

Guthrie's former home later became part of the Homewood Sanitarium, the first psychiatric facility in Ontario.

== Electoral record ==
By-election: On Mr. Stirton's resignation to become Postmaster of Guelph, 5 July 1876: Wellington South
| Party | Candidate | Votes | % | ±% |
|---|---|---|---|---|
| Liberal | Donald Guthrie | 1,366 | 51.5 | -26.6 |
| Conservative | James Goldie | 1,288 | 48.5 | 26.6 |
| Total valid votes | | 2,654 | 100.0 | |

1878 Canadian federal election: Wellington South
| Party | Candidate | Votes | % | ±% |
|---|---|---|---|---|
| Liberal | Donald Guthrie | 1,832 | 54.5 | 3.0 |
| Conservative | James Goldie | 1,529 | 45.5 | -3.0 |
| Total valid votes | | 3,361 | 100.0 | |
