= John Ransom Howitt =

Member of the Ontario Provincial Parliament for Wellington South
- In office October 21, 1910 – November 13, 1911
- Preceded by: Joseph Patrick Downey
- Succeeded by: Henry Scholfield

Personal details
- Party: Conservative

John Ransom Howitt was a Canadian politician from Ontario. He represented Wellington South in the Legislative Assembly of Ontario from a 1910 by-election until 1911.

== See also ==
- 12th Parliament of Ontario
