= Alfred Hales =

Canadian politician (1909–1998)

- Official 1973 portrait

Member of Parliament for Wellington (Wellington South; 1957–1968)
- In office 10 June 1957 – 7 July 1974
- Preceded by: Henry Alfred Hosking
- Succeeded by: Frank Maine

Personal details
- Born: Alfred Dryden Hales; 22 November 1909 Guelph, Ontario, Canada
- Died: 22 February 1998 (aged 88)
- Party: Progressive Conservative
- Profession: Butcher; Meat Cutter; Farmer; Manufacturer; Merchant

Alfred Dryden Hales (22 November 1909 – 22 February 1998) was a Canadian businessman and politician. Hales was a Progressive Conservative party member of the House of Commons of Canada. He was born in Guelph, Ontario and had careers as a butcher, meat cutter, farmer, manufacturer and merchant.

Hales graduated with a Bachelor of Science in agriculture from the University of Toronto's Ontario Agricultural College in 1934. He also played two seasons as middle wing for the Toronto Argonauts in 1934 and 1935.

After an unsuccessful attempt to win the Wellington South riding in the 1953 federal election, Hales became a Guelph city councillor in 1955. He campaigned again for Parliament in the 1957 election. He was re-elected to consecutive terms at Wellington South, then from the 1968 election at Wellington. His Parliamentary career ended in May 1974 after he completed his term in the 29th Canadian Parliament, and Hales did not campaign in the 1974 election. He repeatedly introduced a Private Member's Bill to create the Parliamentary Internship Programme until this was approved in 1969. Today, an annual award named in his honour is given by the Institute on Governance to the best essay by a Parliamentary intern.

Hales chaired the House of Commons Standing Committee on Public Accounts from 1966 to 1974, following the tradition that such a chair be a member of the Official Opposition.

== Electoral record ==
=== Wellington South ===
1953 Canadian federal election: Wellington South
Party	Candidate	Votes	%	±%
Liberal	Henry Alfred Hosking	9,275	45.4	-1.9
Progressive Conservative	Alfred Hales	8,722	42.7	7.1
Co-operative Commonwealth	Thomas L. Withers	2,431	11.9	-5.2
Total valid votes		20,428	100.0	

1957 Canadian federal election: Wellington South
Party	Candidate	Votes	%	±%
Progressive Conservative	Alfred Hales	11,632	54.6	11.9
Liberal	David Tolton	6,090	28.6	-16.8
Co-operative Commonwealth	Thomas L. Withers	3,573	16.8	4.9
Total valid votes		21,295	100.0	

1958 Canadian federal election: Wellington South
Party	Candidate	Votes	%	±%
Progressive Conservative	Alfred Hales	15,160	59.4	4.8
Liberal	James B. Keating	8,194	32.1	2.5
Co-operative Commonwealth	Fred J. White	2,186	8.5	-7.3
Total valid votes		25,540	100.0	

1962 Canadian federal election: Wellington South
Party	Candidate	Votes	%	±%
Progressive Conservative	Alfred Hales	11,345	42.0	-17.4
Liberal	Roy McVittie	8,508	31.5	-0.6
New Democratic	John Paul Harney	6,989	25.9	17.4
Social Credit	Reginald Youd	174	0.6	0.6
Total valid votes		27,016	100.0	

1963 Canadian federal election: Wellington South
Party	Candidate	Votes	%	±%
Progressive Conservative	Alfred Hales	11,350	39.7	-2.3
Liberal	Ralph Dent	10,713	37.5	6.0
New Democratic	John Paul Harney	6,391	22.3	-3.6
Social Credit	Reginald Youd	150	0.5	-0.1
Total valid votes		28,604	100.0	

1965 Canadian federal election: Wellington South
Party	Candidate	Votes	%	±%
Progressive Conservative	Alfred Hales	11,264	38.8	-0.9
New Democratic	John Paul Harney	9,190	31.6	7.3
Liberal	Donald E. McFadzen	8,595	29.6	-7.9
Total valid votes		29,049	100.0	

=== Wellington ===
1968 Canadian federal election
Party	Candidate	Votes	%	±%
Progressive Conservative	Alfred Dryden HALES	13,496	44.5	
Liberal	Ralph DENT	11,842	39.0	
New Democratic	Phil LANTHIER	5,012	16.5	
Total valid votes		30,350	100.0	

1972 Canadian federal election
Party	Candidate	Votes	%	±%
Progressive Conservative	Alfred Dryden HALES	20,730	53.1	+8.6
Liberal	Jake SLINGER	11,022	28.2	-10.8
New Democratic	Margaret MCCREADY	7,050	18.1	+1.6
Communist	Gareth BLYTHE	174	0.4	+0.4
Marxist–Leninist	Terry THERIAULT	67	0.2	+0.2
Total valid votes		39,043	100.0	

== Archives ==
There are Alfred Hales fonds at Library and Archives Canada and the Guelph Public Library.
