= Mutrie =

Mutrie is a surname, and may refer to:

- Annie Feray Mutrie (1826–1893), British painter
- Jim Mutrie (1851–1938), American baseball pioneer
- John Mutrie (1849–1929), Canadian farmer and political figure
- Les Mutrie (1951–2017), English footballer
- Martha Darley Mutrie (1824–1885), British painter
