= Caleb Henry Buckland =

Canadian politician from Ontario

Member of the Ontario Provincial Parliament for Wellington South
- In office October 20, 1919 – May 10, 1923
- Preceded by: Samuel Carter
- Succeeded by: Lincoln Goldie

Personal details
- Party: Conservative

Caleb Henry Buckland was a Canadian politician from the Conservative Party of Ontario. He represented Wellington South in the Legislative Assembly of Ontario from 1919 to 1923.

== See also ==
- 15th Parliament of Ontario
