= James Massie =

Canadian politician

Ontario MPP
- In office 1876–1879
- Preceded by: Peter Gow
- Succeeded by: James Laidlaw
- Constituency: Wellington South

Personal details
- Born: October 20, 1833 Lumphannan, Aberdeenshire, Scotland
- Died: May 1, 1904 (aged 70) Toronto, Ontario
- Party: Liberal
- Spouse: Mary Ann Armstrong (m. 1862)
- Children: 4
- Occupation: Businessman

James M. Massie (October 20, 1833 – May 1, 1904) was an Ontario businessman and political figure. He represented Wellington South in the Legislative Assembly of Ontario as a Liberal member from 1876 to 1879.

Massie was born to James Massie and Elizabeth Ann Masson in Lumphannan, Aberdeenshire, Scotland. On September 23, 1862, he married Mary Ann Armstrong, in Guelph, Province of Canada. Together they had four children: Jessie Marion Massie (1866–1929) Elizabeth Euphemia Massie (1968-1951) Dr James Alexander Massie (1871-1928) and Robert Frank Massie (1877–1935).

Massie was elected in a by-election called when Peter Gow, the sitting Liberal MPP resigned to accept the Shrievalty of Wellington (i.e. he became the County Sheriff). As had been the case with his predecessor, the Conservative Party chose not to run a candidate against Massie and he was acclaimed.

Massie had been active in the Reform Party, as the provincial Liberal Party was then called, since the early 1870s. He served for only one year and his Legislative Service included membership on as many as four Standing Committees, simultaneously. In 1879, he left politics to accept an appointment as the Warden of the Central Prison, in Toronto. In 1885, the provincial government appointed a royal commission investigating charges of “cruelty, partiality and mismanagement” against Massie, in his capacity as the warden of Central Prison. Despite incredible latitude given to prisoners and ex-prisoners to recount any complaints against Massie, in particular, or the prison, in general, the Commission determined there were no grounds for any complaints against Massie and, if anything, he was deemed to be too lenient. There was a second Commission created, in 1890, to chair a commission on the prison and reformatory system of Ontario. Massie's testimony featured prominently in the enquiry.

He was active in a variety of businesses in and around Guelph, Ontario. He was a partner with Guelph merchant Christopher Campbell in the firm “Massie and Campbell”, manufacturers of wholesale biscuits and confectioneries. In 1870, he was elected as one of the first Directors of the Guelph Gas Company, a business established to produce and distribute natural gas in the town. He was an active member of St. Andrews Presbyterian Church, in Guelph, and the St. Andrews Society. As a hobby, he was an award-winning breeder of pigeons. On July 21, 1891, he was elected as one of the founding Directors of the Children's Aid Society and Fresh Air Fund, in Toronto.

Massie died in Toronto on May 1, 1904.

== Electoral history ==
Ontario provincial by-election, September 1876: Wellington South Resignation of Peter Gow
Party	Candidate	Votes
Liberal	James Massie	Acclaimed
Source: History of the Electoral Districts, Legislatures and Ministries of the Province of Ontario
