= James Laidlaw (politician) =

Canadian politician

Ontario MPP
- In office 1879–1886
- Preceded by: James Massie
- Succeeded by: Donald Guthrie
- Constituency: Wellington South

Personal details
- Born: July 7, 1822 Roxburghshire, Scotland
- Died: March 19, 1905 (aged 82) Guelph, Ontario
- Party: Liberal
- Spouse: Mary Beattie (m. 1848)
- Occupation: Farmer

James Laidlaw (July 7, 1822 – March 3, 1905) was a Canadian farmer and politician. He represented Wellington South in the Legislative Assembly of Ontario as a Liberal member from 1879 to 1886.

He was born in Roxburghshire, Scotland in 1822 and came to Guelph, Upper Canada with his family in 1831. In 1848, he married Mary Beattie. He served on the council for Guelph Township, also serving as reeve and warden for Wellington County. Laidlaw served as manager for the Government farm and Agriculture College at Guelph in 1875.
