= Ian Strachan (Ontario politician) =

Canadian politician

Ontario MPP
- In office 1934–1943
- Preceded by: Henry Scholfield
- Succeeded by: Dana Porter
- Constituency: St. George

Personal details
- Born: 1898 Brockville, Ontario, Canada
- Died: February 4, 1964 (aged 65–66) Toronto, Ontario, Canada
- Party: Liberal
- Occupation: Lawyer

Ian Thomas Strachan (1898–1964) was a Canadian politician, who represented the electoral district of St. George in the Legislative Assembly of Ontario from 1934 to 1943. He was a member of the Ontario Liberal Party.

== Background ==
Born in Brockville, Ontario in 1898, he was a great-grandson of former Prime Minister Alexander Mackenzie. He graduated from the University of Toronto Schools, and served with the 1st Canadian Tank Battalion during World War I, and later studied political science at the University of Toronto and law at Osgoode Hall Law School. He was called to the bar in 1925, and practiced law with the firm Erichsen-Brown and Strachan. He was made King's Counsel in 1934.

== Political career ==
He was selected as the Liberal candidate in St. George for the 1934 election after his mother Helen Strachan, the president of the Toronto Liberal Women's Association and the riding's original Liberal candidate, withdrew from the race for health reasons. He won the election, and served in the government of Mitchell Hepburn.

In his first term in the legislature, he served as a member of various standing committees. In 1936, he pledged to support Hepburn's then-controversial bill to extend funding to Roman Catholic separate schools in the province even if his support of the bill led to his defeat in the next election, on the grounds that equal funding for Roman Catholic education in the province was an important principle of religious rights.

After being reelected in the 1937 election, he was appointed as the Liberal caucus whip. He served as whip until 1942, when he was dropped from the position after Gordon Daniel Conant succeeded Hepburn as Liberal leader and premier.

== Life after politics ==
He did not run for reelection in the 1943 election, instead accepting an appointment as registrar of deeds for the city of Toronto.

He died on February 4, 1964, at his home in Toronto of a heart attack.
