= Dana Porter =

Canadian politician (1901–1967)

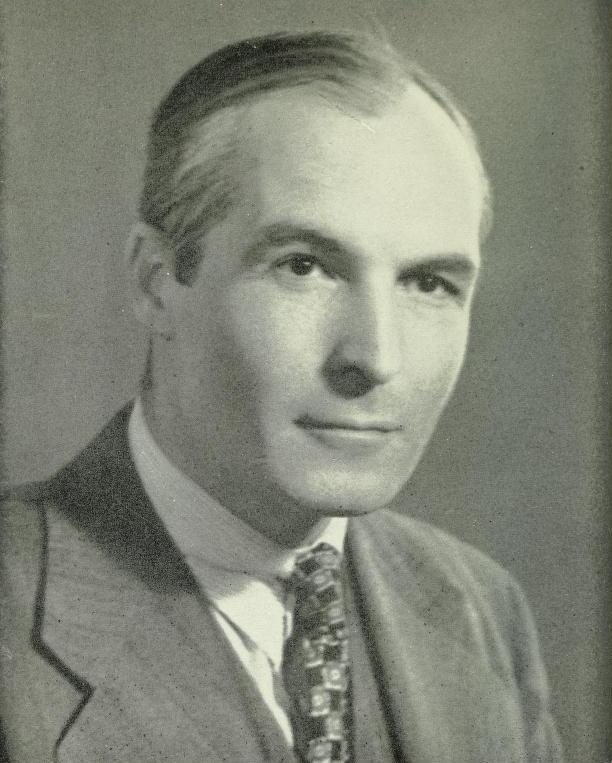
- Porter, c. 1948

1st Chancellor of the University of Waterloo
- In office 1960–1966
- President/Vice Chancellor: Gerry Hagey
- Preceded by: Office established
- Succeeded by: Ira Needles

Chief Justice of Ontario
- In office 1958–1967
- Preceded by: John Wellington Pickup
- Succeeded by: George Alexander Gale

Attorney General of Ontario
- In office 1949–1955
- Premier: Leslie Frost
- Preceded by: Leslie Blackwell
- Succeeded by: Kelso Roberts

Treasurer of Ontario
- In office 1955–1958
- Premier: Leslie Frost
- Preceded by: Leslie Frost
- Succeeded by: Leslie Frost

MPP for St. George
- In office 1943–1958
- Preceded by: Ian Strachan
- Succeeded by: Allan Lawrence

Personal details
- Born: Dana Harris Porter; January 14, 1901 Toronto, Ontario
- Died: May 13, 1967 (aged 66)
- Party: Conservative
- Profession: Lawyer, judge

Dana Harris Porter (January 14, 1901 – May 13, 1967) was a Canadian politician and jurist. Porter was a member of the Ontario Legislature from 1943 to 1958 serving as a representative for Toronto St. George and was appointed Chief Justice in 1958. He was the first chancellor of the University of Waterloo.

== Early life and education ==
Porter was born January 14, 1901, in Toronto. His father, Dr. George Porter, was the director of health services at the University of Toronto and his brother was hockey player John Porter, who went on to serve as executive vice-president at Simpsons.

After graduating from the University of Toronto Schools, Porter earned an undergraduate degree from the University of Toronto in 1921. He continued his studies in England at Balliol College, Oxford from which he graduated with a master's degree in 1923. He returned to Toronto where he earned a law degree from Osgoode Hall. After being called to the bar he joined the firm of Fennel, Porter & Davis.

== Career ==
Porter entered politics in 1943 winning a seat in the Legislative Assembly of Ontario representing the downtown Toronto riding of St. George in the 1943 provincial election. First serving as parliamentary assistant to then Premier George A. Drew, Porter went on to be named Minister of Planning and Development. During his fifteen-year career in the legislature, he was elected five times, never once losing an election.

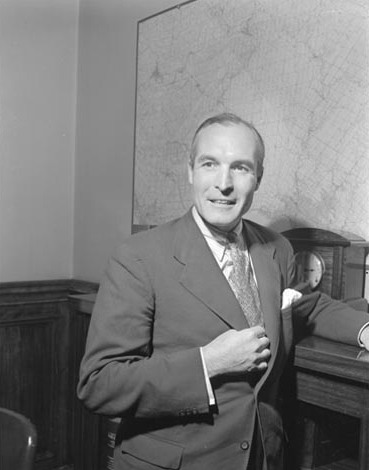
Porter in 1948

In 1958, Porter left politics to accept an appointment as Chief Justice of the Ontario Court of Appeal. He made a notable ruling in 1964, lifting a ban on the book Fanny Hill.

Porter was the first chancellor of the University of Waterloo, serving from 1960 to 1966. The university's arts library was named the Dana Porter Arts Library following Porter's death in 1967.

== Personal life ==
Porter married his wife Dorothy (née Parker) in 1929. Together they had two sons - Dana Jr. and Julian. in his spare time he enjoyed gardening, painting and reading, and had an extensive knowledge of Shakespeare.

== Death ==
Porter died of cancer on May 13, 1967, at Wellesley Hospital in Toronto. Following his death Ontario's Supreme Courts were recessed from May 15 until after his funeral, with county courts also closing at noon on the day of the service. The funeral was held on May 16 at the Metropolitan United Church in Toronto. Led by Reverend Arthur B. B. Moore, nearly 1,000 were in attendance. Among the 23 honorary pallbearers were former prime minister John Diefenbaker, former Ontario premier John Robarts and author Claude Bissell. Following the service, Porter's body was interred at Mount Pleasant Cemetery.

== See also ==
- List of University of Waterloo people

Academic offices
Preceded by New position	Chancellor of the University of Waterloo; 1960–1966	Succeeded by Ira G. Needles
