= Samuel Carter (Canadian politician) =

Canadian politician (1859–1944)

Ontario MPP
- In office 1914–1919
- Preceded by: Henry Scholfield
- Succeeded by: Caleb Henry Buckland
- Constituency: Wellington South

36th Mayor of Guelph, Ontario
- In office 1913–1914
- Preceded by: George Thorpe
- Succeeded by: H. Mahoney

Personal details
- Born: December 8, 1859 Ruddington, Nottinghamshire, England
- Died: June 16, 1944 (aged 84) Guelph, Ontario
- Party: Liberal-Prohibitionist
- Occupation: Manufacturer, politician

Samuel Carter (December 8, 1859 – June 16, 1944) was a Canadian manufacturer and politician. He represented Wellington South in the Legislative Assembly of Ontario from 1914 to 1919 as a Liberal-Prohibitionist. In 1919 he subsequently ran as an Independent Liberal and was defeated by Caleb Buckland.

Carter was born in Ruddington, Nottinghamshire, England, the son of Samuel Carter, and went to Ontario in 1882. He owned a knitting mill. He was the mayor of Guelph from 1913 to 1914. He was vice-president of the Hydro-Electric Union and chairman of the Heat and Light Commission for the city. He was also president of the Workingman's Co-operative Association of Guelph. In 1909, he became the first president of the Co-operative Union of Canada (later part of the Canadian Co-operative Association), serving until 1921. Carter was an unsuccessful candidate for a seat in the federal parliament in 1921. He died at his home in Guelph in 1944.

Carter donated the Elms Park playing field to the village of Ruddington in 1931.
