= Wellington South (federal electoral district) =

Former federal electoral district in Ontario, Canada

Ontario electoral district

Defunct federal electoral district
- Legislature: House of Commons
- District created: 1867
- District abolished: 1966
- First contested: 1867
- Last contested: 1965

Wellington South was a Canadian federal electoral district represented in the House of Commons of Canada from 1867 to 1968. It was located in the province of Ontario. It was created by the British North America Act 1867 as the "South Riding of the county of Wellington". The County of Wellington was divided into three ridings: the North, South and Centre Ridings".

The South Riding initially consisted of the Town of Guelph, and the Townships of Guelph and Puslinch. In 1872, the Townships of Eramosa and Erin were added to the riding.

In 1903, the county of Wellington was divided into two ridings, to be called the north and the south ridings of Wellington. To the south riding were added consisted of the townships of Nichol and Pilkington, and the villages of Elora, Erin and Fergus.

In 1924, the riding was renamed "Wellington South" and was defined as consisting of the part of the county of Wellington lying south of the north boundary of the township of Pilkington, the north and east boundaries of the township of Nichol and the north boundary of the townships of Eramosa and Erin.

In 1933, it was redefined to consist of the part of the county of Wellington lying south of the north boundary of the township of Pilkington, the north and east boundaries of the township of Nichol and the north and east boundaries of the townships of Eramosa.

In 1947, it was redefined to consist of the city of Guelph and the townships of Puslinch, Eramosa, Guelph, Pilkington and Nichol. In 1952, the township of Erin and the village of Elora were added, while the township of Nichol was removed.

The electoral district was abolished in 1966 when it was redistributed between Halton, Wellington and Wellington—Grey ridings.

== Members of Parliament ==
This riding elected the following members of the House of Commons of Canada:

Parliament	Years	Member	Party
1st	1867–1872	David Stirton	Liberal
2nd	1872–1874	David Stirton	Liberal
3rd	1874–1876	David Stirton	Liberal
3rd	1876–1878	Donald Guthrie	Liberal
4th	1878–1882	Donald Guthrie	Liberal
5th	1882–1887	James Innes	Liberal
6th	1887–1891	James Innes	Liberal
7th	1891–1896	James Innes	Liberal
8th	1896–1900	Christian Kloepfer	Conservative
9th	1900–1904	Hugh Guthrie	Liberal
10th	1904–1908	Hugh Guthrie	Liberal
11th	1908–1911	Hugh Guthrie	Liberal
12th	1911–1917	Hugh Guthrie	Liberal
14th	1917–1921	Hugh Guthrie	Government (Unionist)
15th	1921–1925	Hugh Guthrie	Conservative
16th	1925–1926	Hugh Guthrie	Conservative
17th	1926–1930	Hugh Guthrie	Conservative
18th	1930–1935	Hugh Guthrie	Conservative
19th	1935–1940	Robert Gladstone	Liberal
20th	1940–1945	Robert Gladstone	Liberal
21st	1945–1949	Robert Gladstone	Liberal
22nd	1949–1953	Henry Alfred Hosking	Liberal
23rd	1953–1957	Henry Alfred Hosking	Liberal
24th	1957–1958	Alfred Hales	Progressive Conservative
25th	1958–1962	Alfred Hales	Progressive Conservative
26th	1962–1963	Alfred Hales	Progressive Conservative
27th	1963–1965	Alfred Hales	Progressive Conservative
28th	1965–1968	Alfred Hales	Progressive Conservative
Riding dissolved into Halton, Wellington and Wellington—Grey

== Election results ==
1867 Canadian federal election
Party	Candidate	Votes	%	±%
Liberal	David Stirton	963	59.6	
Unknown	F. W. Stone	652	40.4	
Total valid votes		1,615	100.0	

1872 Canadian federal election: Wellington South
Party	Candidate	Votes
Liberal	David Stirton	acclaimed
Source: Canadian Elections Database

1874 Canadian federal election
Party	Candidate	Votes	%	±%
Liberal	David Stirton	1,667	78.1	
Unknown	H. Hatch	468	21.9	
Total valid votes		2,135	100.0	
Source: lop.parl.ca

By-election: On Mr. Stirton's resignation to become Postmaster of Guelph, 5 July 1876: Wellington South
Party	Candidate	Votes	%	±%
Liberal	Donald Guthrie	1,366	51.5	-26.6
Conservative	James Goldie	1,288	48.5	26.6
Total valid votes		2,654	100.0	

1878 Canadian federal election
Party	Candidate	Votes	%	±%
Liberal	Donald Guthrie	1,832	54.5	3.0
Conservative	James Goldie	1,529	45.5	-3.0
Total valid votes		3,361	100.0	

1882 Canadian federal election
Party	Candidate	Votes	%	±%
Liberal	James Innes	1,790	51.7	-2.8
Conservative	James Goldie	1,672	48.3	2.8
Total valid votes		3,462	100.0	

1887 Canadian federal election
Party	Candidate	Votes	%	±%
Liberal	James Innes	2,411	51.3	-0.4
Conservative	James Goldie	2,285	48.7	0.4
Total valid votes		4,696	100.0	

1891 Canadian federal election
Party	Candidate	Votes	%	±%
Liberal	James Innes	2,510	54.0	2.7
Conservative	James Goldie	2,134	46.0	-2.7
Total valid votes		4,644	100.0	

1896 Canadian federal election
Party	Candidate	Votes	%	±%
Conservative	Christian Kloepfer	2,578	51.4	5.4
Liberal	James Innes	2,440	48.6	-5.4
Total valid votes		5,018	100.0	

1900 Canadian federal election
Party	Candidate	Votes	%	±%
Liberal	Hugh Guthrie	2,755	51.0	2.4
Conservative	Christian Kloepfer	2,649	49.0	-2.4
Total valid votes		5,404	100.0	

1904 Canadian federal election
Party	Candidate	Votes	%	±%
Liberal	Hugh Guthrie	3,694	52.7	1.7
Conservative	Christian Kloepfer	3,315	47.3	-1.7
Total valid votes		7,009	100.0	

1908 Canadian federal election
Party	Candidate	Votes	%	±%
Liberal	Hugh Guthrie	3,873	55.0	2.3
Conservative	John Newstead	3,172	45.0	-2.3
Total valid votes		7,045	100.0	

1911 Canadian federal election
Party	Candidate	Votes	%	±%
Liberal	Hugh Guthrie	3,368	55.1	0.1
Conservative	Arthur Thomas Kelly Evans	2,744	44.9	-0.1
Total valid votes		6,112	100.0	

1917 Canadian federal election
Party	Candidate	Votes	%	±%
Government (Unionist)	Hugh Guthrie	7,358	77.5	
Labour	Lorne Cunningham	2,139	22.5	
Total valid votes		9,497	100.0	

1921 Canadian federal election
Party	Candidate	Votes	%	±%
Conservative	Hugh Guthrie	6,208	36.6	-40.9
Labour	James Singer	6,077	35.9	13.4
Liberal	Samuel Carter	4,662	27.5	27.5
Total valid votes		16,947	100.0	

1925 Canadian federal election
Party	Candidate	Votes	%	±%
Conservative	Hugh Guthrie	9,096	52.9	16.3
Liberal	Robert Gladstone	8,088	47.1	11.1
Total valid votes		17,184	100.0	

1926 Canadian federal election
Party	Candidate	Votes	%	±%
Conservative	Hugh Guthrie	8,515	53.3	0.4
Liberal	William A. Burnett	7,471	46.7	-0.4
Total valid votes		15,986	100.0	

1930 Canadian federal election
Party	Candidate	Votes	%	±%
Conservative	Hugh Guthrie	8,887	53.0	-0.3
Liberal	John Burr Mitchell	7,893	47.0	0.3
Total valid votes		16,780	100.0	
Source: lop.parl.ca

By-election: On Mr. Guthrie being appointed Minister of Justice, 25 August 1930: Wellington South
Party	Candidate	Votes	%	±%
Conservative	Hugh Guthrie	acclaimed		

1935 Canadian federal election
Party	Candidate	Votes	%	±%
Liberal	Robert Gladstone	8,840	52.4	5.4
Conservative	Hugh Comym Guthrie	5,854	34.7	-18.3
Co-operative Commonwealth	Charles Elgin Fulton	1,578	9.4	9.4
Reconstruction	Frederick Neale	592	3.5	3.5
Total valid votes		16,864	100.0	

1940 Canadian federal election: Wellington South
Party	Candidate	Votes	%	±%
Liberal	Robert Gladstone	8,115	46.9	-5.5
Independent	Charles Leroy Austen	5,073	29.3	29.3
Conservative	Hugh Comym Guthrie	4,121	23.8	-10.9
Total valid votes		17,309	100.0	

1945 Canadian federal election
Party	Candidate	Votes	%	±%
Liberal	Robert Gladstone	8,484	45.2	-1.7
Progressive Conservative	Charles Patrick McTague	7,665	40.8	17.1
Co-operative Commonwealth	Harold Dunk	2,355	12.6	12.6
Communist	James Oldham	268	1.4	1.4
Total valid votes		18,772	100.0	

1949 Canadian federal election
Party	Candidate	Votes	%	±%
Liberal	Henry Alfred Hosking	10,344	47.3	2.1
Progressive Conservative	G. Ernest Robertson	7,778	35.6	-5.2
Co-operative Commonwealth	Charles Franklin Leaman	3,748	17.1	4.5
Total valid votes		21,870	100.0	

1953 Canadian federal election
Party	Candidate	Votes	%	±%
Liberal	Henry Alfred Hosking	9,275	45.4	-1.9
Progressive Conservative	Alfred Hales	8,722	42.7	7.1
Co-operative Commonwealth	Thomas L. Withers	2,431	11.9	-5.2
Total valid votes		20,428	100.0	

1957 Canadian federal election
Party	Candidate	Votes	%	±%
Progressive Conservative	Alfred Hales	11,632	54.6	11.9
Liberal	David Tolton	6,090	28.6	-16.8
Co-operative Commonwealth	Thomas L. Withers	3,573	16.8	4.9
Total valid votes		21,295	100.0	

1958 Canadian federal election
Party	Candidate	Votes	%	±%
Progressive Conservative	Alfred Hales	15,160	59.4	4.8
Liberal	James B. Keating	8,194	32.1	2.5
Co-operative Commonwealth	Fred J. White	2,186	8.5	-7.3
Total valid votes		25,540	100.0	

1962 Canadian federal election
Party	Candidate	Votes	%	±%
Progressive Conservative	Alfred Hales	11,345	42.0	-17.4
Liberal	Roy McVittie	8,508	31.5	-0.6
New Democratic	John Paul Harney	6,989	25.9	17.4
Social Credit	Reginald Youd	174	0.6	0.6
Total valid votes		27,016	100.0	

1963 Canadian federal election
Party	Candidate	Votes	%	±%
Progressive Conservative	Alfred Hales	11,350	39.7	-2.3
Liberal	Ralph Dent	10,713	37.5	6.0
New Democratic	John Paul Harney	6,391	22.3	-3.6
Social Credit	Reginald Youd	150	0.5	-0.1
Total valid votes		28,604	100.0	

1965 Canadian federal election
Party	Candidate	Votes	%	±%
Progressive Conservative	Alfred Hales	11,264	38.8	-0.9
New Democratic	John Paul Harney	9,190	31.6	7.3
Liberal	Donald E. McFadzen	8,595	29.6	-7.9
Total valid votes		29,049	100.0	

== See also ==
- List of Canadian electoral districts
- Historical federal electoral districts of Canada
