= Hugh Guthrie =

Canadian politician

The Honourable Hugh Guthrie PC KC
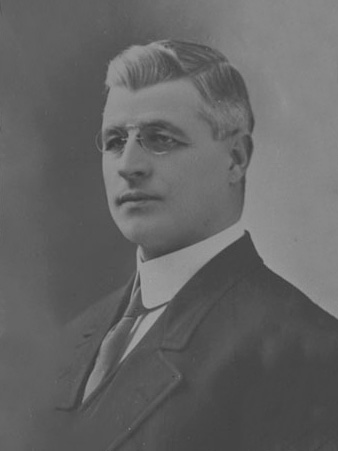
- Guthrie, c. 1917

Leader of the Opposition
- In office 11 October 1926 – 11 October 1927
- Preceded by: W. L. Mackenzie King
- Succeeded by: R. B. Bennett

Member of the Canadian Parliament for Wellington South
- In office November 7, 1900 – October 13, 1935
- Preceded by: Christian Kloepfer
- Succeeded by: Robert Gladstone

Personal details
- Born: 13 August 1866 Guelph, Canada West
- Died: 3 November 1939 (aged 73) Ottawa, Ontario, Canada
- Party: Liberal (1900-1917); Liberal-Unionist/Unionist (1917-1921); Conservative (1921-1939)
- Profession: Lawyer
- Cabinet: Solicitor General (1917-1921); Minister of Militia and Defence (1920-1921); Minister of Justice and Attorney General (1930-1935)

Hugh Guthrie PC KC (13 August 1866 – 3 November 1939) was a Canadian lawyer and politician who served as a minister in the governments of Sir Robert Borden, Arthur Meighen and R. B. Bennett.

== Early life ==
He was born in Guelph, Canada West, the son of Donald Guthrie, and studied there and at Osgoode Hall, becoming a barrister. Guthrie was named a King's Counsel in 1902. He married Maude Henrietta, the daughter of Guelph businessman Thomas H. Scarff.

He partnered with his father in Guelph. Patrick Kerwin joined the firm and became a partner until his appointment to the Supreme Court of Canada in 1935.

== Early political career ==
Guthrie was first elected to the House of Commons as a Liberal in 1900 from the riding of Wellington South. He sat in Wilfrid Laurier's caucus for 17 years, but crossed the floor to join the Unionist government of Robert Borden as a result of the Conscription Crisis of 1917. The former Liberal backbencher became a leading light in his new party, serving as solicitor general under Borden. With the end of World War I, most Liberal-Unionists either rejoined the Liberal Party or joined the new Progressive Party. Guthrie, however, stayed with the Conservatives, becoming minister of militia and defence and running for re-election as a Conservative in the 1921 election. After the election, he joined the Conservatives on the Opposition benches.

As a result of the 1926 "King-Byng Affair", Meighen's Conservatives formed a government in which Guthrie served as Minister of Justice and Minister of National Defence (acting until July 13). This second stint in Cabinet ended with the defeat of the Meighen government in that fall's election. Meighen lost his seat, and Guthrie served as Leader of the Opposition and interim leader of the Conservative Party for a full year.

Guthie sought the party leadership at the leadership convention that the party held in 1927, but was defeated by R.B. Bennett. John Diefenbaker was a delegate to that convention and he wrote in his memoirs that Guthrie's candidacy was hurt when the former Liberal absent-mindedly declared in his speech to delegates that the Conservative meeting was the "greatest Liberal convention in history".

== As Minister of Justice and Attorney General in Bennett's Government ==
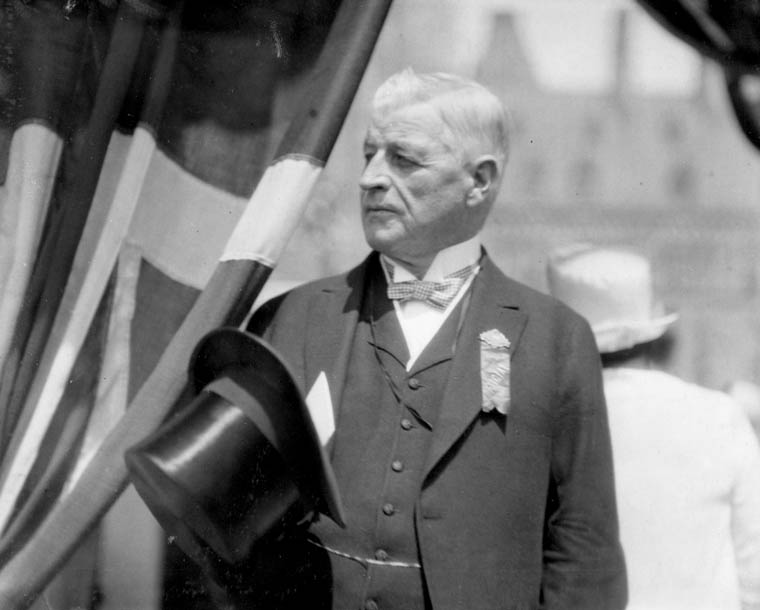
Guthrie as Leader of the Opposition, 1927

Bennett led the Conservatives to victory in the 1930 election, and Guthrie was appointed Minister of Justice and Attorney General. In 1931, he led the Canadian delegation to the League of Nations. In 1933, he introduced legislation making it illegal to carry a concealed weapon without authorization. In 1935, he clashed with opposition Member of Parliament Agnes Macphail who demanded an inquiry into inhumane conditions in Canada's prisons such as the whipping of prisoners.

Guthrie considered recommendations from Western Canadian legal commentators to make the Supreme Court of Canada a traveling circuit court to ease western skepticism. He rejected the proposal due to the practicality, British tradition of the appeal court remaining stationary, and difficulties the justices would experience in traveling and writing decisions.

=== Guthrie and communism ===
As the Great Depression worsened and millions were unemployed, the government became increasingly concerned about political instability and the growth of radical movements. Guthrie's department was responsible for the persecution of the Communist Party of Canada, and the arrest and incarceration of Communists, including leader Tim Buck, for sedition.

In 1933, Tim Buck was shot at by soldiers in an apparent assassination attempt while he was in his cell during a prison riot. Guthrie was forced to admit that the attack was deliberate, but claimed the intent was only to frighten him; however, the public outcry at this incident lead to Buck being released.

=== On to Ottawa Trek ===
In 1935, unemployed workers in British Columbia deserted the remote relief camps established by the Bennett government, and began the "On to Ottawa Trek". Thousands of unemployed workers hopped on freight trains heading east intending to converge in Ottawa and press their demands on the government. Bennett's cabinet saw this as an insurrectionary movement and panicked. In the House of Commons, Guthrie charged that the protesters "were a distinct menace to the peace, order and good government of Canada."

As the protesters entered Saskatchewan, Guthrie had the Trek banned, over the objections of Saskatchewan Premier James G. Gardiner. He and Bennett ordered the Royal Canadian Mounted Police to use tear gas and revolvers to break up the Trek when it entered Regina. The city was but under siege with hundreds of police officers moved in blocking all exits from the city. On July 1, 1935, the police attacked a meeting attended by 3,000 people resulting in one death, dozens of injuries and national outrage.

== Retirement and later life ==
Guthrie declined to contest the 1935 election that routed Bennett's government, preferring to retiring from politics at the age of 69. He died four years later on 3 November 1939 at the age of 73.

== Electoral record (Wellington South) ==
1900 Canadian federal election: Wellington South
Party	Candidate	Votes	%	±%
Liberal	Hugh Guthrie	2,755	51.0	2.4
Conservative	Christian Kloepfer	2,649	49.0	-2.4
Total valid votes		5,404	100.0	

1904 Canadian federal election: Wellington South
Party	Candidate	Votes	%	±%
Liberal	Hugh Guthrie	3,694	52.7	1.7
Conservative	Christian Kloepfer	3,315	47.3	-1.7
Total valid votes		7,009	100.0	

1908 Canadian federal election: Wellington South
Party	Candidate	Votes	%	±%
Liberal	Hugh Guthrie	3,873	55.0	2.3
Conservative	John Newstead	3,172	45.0	-2.3
Total valid votes		7,045	100.0	

1911 Canadian federal election: Wellington South
Party	Candidate	Votes	%	±%
Liberal	Hugh Guthrie	3,368	55.1	0.1
Conservative	Arthur Thomas Kelly Evans	2,744	44.9	-0.1
Total valid votes		6,112	100.0	

1917 Canadian federal election: Wellington South
Party	Candidate	Votes	%	±%
Government (Unionist)	Hugh Guthrie	7,358	77.5	
Labour	Lorne Cunningham	2,139	22.5	
Total valid votes		9,497	100.0	

1921 Canadian federal election: Wellington South
Party	Candidate	Votes	%	±%
Conservative	Hugh Guthrie	6,208	36.6	-40.9
Labour	James Singer	6,077	35.9	13.4
Liberal	Samuel Carter	4,662	27.5	27.5
Total valid votes		16,947	100.0	

1925 Canadian federal election: Wellington South
Party	Candidate	Votes	%	±%
Conservative	Hugh Guthrie	9,096	52.9	16.3
Liberal	Robert Gladstone	8,088	47.1	11.1
Total valid votes		17,184	100.0	

1926 Canadian federal election: Wellington South
Party	Candidate	Votes	%	±%
Conservative	Hugh Guthrie	8,515	53.3	0.4
Liberal	William A. Burnett	7,471	46.7	-0.4
Total valid votes		15,986	100.0	

1930 Canadian federal election: Wellington South
Party	Candidate	Votes	%	±%
Conservative	Hugh Guthrie	8,887	53.0	-0.3
Liberal	John Burr Mitchell	7,893	47.0	0.3
Total valid votes		16,780	100.0	
Source: lop.parl.ca

By-election: On Mr. Guthrie being appointed Minister of Justice, 25 August 1930: Wellington South
Party	Candidate	Votes	%	±%
Conservative	Hugh Guthrie	acclaimed		

Parliament of Canada
Preceded by Christian Kloepfer	Member of Parliament from Wellington South; 1900–1935	Succeeded by Robert William Gladstone
Political offices
Preceded by Arthur Meighen (acting)	Solicitor General of Canada; 1917–1921	Succeeded by Guillaume-André Fauteux
Preceded by James Alexander Calder	Minister of Militia and Defence; 1920-1921	Succeeded by George Perry Graham
Preceded by Edward Mortimer Macdonald	Minister of National Defence; 1926	Succeeded by James Robb (politician)
Preceded by Ernest Lapointe	Minister of Justice; 1926	Succeeded by Esioff-Léon Patenaude
Preceded by Arthur Meighen	Leader of the Opposition; 1926–1927	Succeeded by R. B. Bennett
Preceded by Ernest Lapointe	Minister of Justice; 1930-1935	Succeeded by George Reginald Geary
Party political offices
Preceded by Arthur Meighen	Leader of the Conservative Party; 1926–1927; Interim	Succeeded by R. B. Bennett
