= Robert Gladstone =

Canadian politician

The Honourable Robert Gladstone

Member of Parliament for Wellington South
- In office October 1935 – April 1949
- Preceded by: Hugh Guthrie
- Succeeded by: Henry Alfred Hosking

Personal details
- Born: Robert William Gladstone; 13 September 1879 Oxford, Ontario, Canada
- Died: 1 June 1951 (aged 71) Ottawa, Ontario, Canada
- Party: Liberal
- Spouse(s): Elizabeth Lyons m. 10 January 1912
- Profession: manager, manufacturer, teacher

Robert William Gladstone (13 September 1879 – 1 June 1951) was a Liberal party member of the House of Commons of Canada. He was born in Oxford, Ontario and became a manager, manufacturer and teacher by career.

After an unsuccessful attempt to win Wellington South in the 1925 federal election, he was elected to Parliament there in the 1935 election. He was re-elected in 1940 and 1945. He was appointed to the Senate in September 1949 thus leaving the House of Commons. He remained in the Senate until his death at Ottawa Civic Hospital on 1 June 1951 due to a heart condition. He was survived by his wife and a son.

== Electoral record ==
1925 Canadian federal election: Wellington South
Party	Candidate	Votes	%	±%
Conservative	Hugh Guthrie	9,096	52.9	16.3
Liberal	Robert Gladstone	8,088	47.1	11.1
Total valid votes		17,184	100.0	

1935 Canadian federal election: Wellington South
Party	Candidate	Votes	%	±%
Liberal	Robert Gladstone	8,840	52.4	5.4
Conservative	Hugh Comym Guthrie	5,854	34.7	-18.3
Co-operative Commonwealth	Charles Elgin Fulton	1,578	9.4	9.4
Reconstruction	Frederick Neale	592	3.5	3.5
Total valid votes		16,864	100.0	

1940 Canadian federal election: Wellington South
Party	Candidate	Votes	%	±%
Liberal	Robert Gladstone	8,115	46.9	-5.5
Independent	Charles Leroy Austen	5,073	29.3	29.3
Conservative	Hugh Comym Guthrie	4,121	23.8	-10.9
Total valid votes		17,309	100.0	

1945 Canadian federal election: Wellington South
Party	Candidate	Votes	%	±%
Liberal	Robert Gladstone	8,484	45.2	-1.7
Progressive Conservative	Charles Patrick McTague	7,665	40.8	17.1
Co-operative Commonwealth	Harold Dunk	2,355	12.6	12.6
Communist	James Oldham	268	1.4	1.4
Total valid votes		18,772	100.0	
