= St. George (Ontario provincial electoral district) =

Former provincial electoral district in Ontario, Canada

Coordinates: 43.66°N 79.38°W

Ontario electoral district
- St. George, in relation to the other Toronto ridings, after the 1926 redistribution.

Defunct provincial electoral district
- Legislature: Legislative Assembly of Ontario
- District created: 1925
- District abolished: 1987
- First contested: 1926
- Last contested: 1985

St. George was a provincial riding in Ontario, Canada, that returned Members of Provincial Parliament (MPPs) to the Legislative Assembly of Ontario at Queen's Park. It was created in downtown Toronto in 1926 and was merged into the riding of St. George—St. David in 1987. The seat covered much of the city's central core, roughly similar to the current riding of Toronto Centre. At its dissolution it stretched from University Avenue to Parliament Street and from the waterfront north past St. Clair.

== Boundaries ==
The riding was formed in 1926 from parts of the old Toronto Northeast and Toronto Southeast ridings. Its western boundary starting at Toronto Harbour went north following the line of Simcoe Street. At Queen Street West it jogged east a block to University Avenue. It followed this street north continuing along Queen's Park Crescent East and Avenue Road north to St. Clair Avenue West. At St. Clair it turned east and went to Yonge Street. At Yonge it turned south and followed this street to Bloor Street. It then turned east following Bloor until it reached Sherbourne Street. It then followed Sherbourne back south until it met the harbour.

Prior to the 1934 election, the riding boundaries were changed. The western boundary was moved east to Bay Street. The boundary followed Bay Street north from the harbour until it curved northwest to meet Davenport Road. It followed Davenport until it met Avenue Road. It turned north following Avenue Road north skirting Upper Canada College on the east side until it met the old Belt Line Railway right-of-way. It then headed southeast following the right-of-way until it reached Yonge Street. From here it turned south following a line through the Mount Pleasant cemetery and through a ravine called the Vale of Avoca (these days it is called David Balfour Park). It followed the ravine until it reached the CPR right-of-way. It headed east along this right-of-way until it reached MacLennan Avenue. It then turned south following this street and continued south on the same line when it turned into Sherbourne Street at Bloor. It continued along Sherbourne Street until it reached the harbour.

== Members of Provincial Parliament ==
St. George
Assembly	Years	Member	Party
Created in 1926 from parts of Toronto Northeast and Toronto Southeast
17th	1926–1929	Henry Scholfield	Conservative
18th	1929–1934	Henry Scholfield	Conservative
19th	1934–1937	Ian Strachan (Note: In 1938, the title of Member of the Legislative Assembly was officially changed to Member of Provincial Parliament. Previously, it was unofficially used in the media and in the Legislature.)	Liberal
20th	1937–1943	Ian Strachan	Liberal
21st	1943–1945	Dana Porter (Note: Resigned January 30, 1958 to accept appointment as Chief Justice of the Ontario Court of Appeal.)	Progressive Conservative
22nd	1945–1948	Dana Porter	Progressive Conservative
23rd	1948–1951	Dana Porter	Progressive Conservative
24th	1951–1955	Dana Porter	Progressive Conservative
25th	1955–1958	Dana Porter	Progressive Conservative
25th	1958–1959	Allan Lawrence (Note: Resigned September 19, 1972 in order to run for Federal parliament.)	Progressive Conservative
26th	1959–1963	Allan Lawrence	Progressive Conservative
27th	1963–1967	Allan Lawrence	Progressive Conservative
28th	1967–1971	Allan Lawrence	Progressive Conservative
29th	1971–1972	Allan Lawrence	Progressive Conservative
29th	1972–1975	Margaret Campbell	Liberal
30th	1975–1977	Margaret Campbell	Liberal
31st	1977–1981	Margaret Campbell	Liberal
32nd	1981–1985	Susan Fish	Progressive Conservative
33rd	1985–1987	Susan Fish	Progressive Conservative
Sourced from the Ontario Legislative Assembly
Merged with St. David to form St. George—St. David after 1987

== Election results ==
=== 1967 electoral boundaries ===
1985 Ontario general election
Party	Candidate	Votes	%	±%
Progressive Conservative	Susan Fish	11,378	35.04	–7.96
New Democratic	Diana Hunt	10,543	32.46	+15.12
Liberal	Joseph Mifsud	9,361	28.83	+0.58
Libertarian	Michael C. Beech	1,007	3.10	+1.85
Independent	Karol Siroky	186	0.57	–
Total valid votes		32,475	99.03	
Total rejected ballots		318	0.97	+0.11
Turnout		32,793	57.84	–0.68
Eligible voters		56,697		
Progressive Conservative hold		Swing		–11.54
Source: Elections Ontario

1981 Ontario general election
Party	Candidate	Votes	%	±%
Progressive Conservative	Susan Fish	12,390	43.00	+7.85
Liberal	Bruce McLeod	8,139	28.25	–8.46
New Democratic	Dan Leckie	4,999	17.35	–5.46
Independent	George Hislop	2,677	9.29	–
Libertarian	Bruce Evoy	359	1.25	+0.00
Independent	Rhino Mills	194	0.67	–
Independent	Gary Weagle	57	0.20	–
Total valid votes		28,815	99.14	
Total rejected ballots		250	0.86	–0.15
Turnout		29,065	58.52	–2.23
Eligible voters		49,668		
Progressive Conservative gain from Liberal		Swing		+8.15
Source: Elections Ontario

1977 Ontario general election
Party	Candidate	Votes	%	±%
Liberal	Margaret Campbell	10,116	36.71	–5.39
Progressive Conservative	Frank Vasilkioti	9,688	35.15	+2.45
New Democratic	Lukin Robinson	6,287	22.81	–0.17
Independent	Donald M. Campbell	975	3.54	–
Libertarian	David T. Anderson	342	1.24	+0.12
Communist	Leonard (Fred) Weir	152	0.55	–0.55
Total valid votes		27,560	98.99	
Total rejected ballots		282	1.01	+0.53
Turnout		27,842	60.75	+0.22
Eligible voters		45,833		
Liberal hold		Swing		–3.92
Source: Elections Ontario

1975 Ontario general election
Party	Candidate	Votes	%	±%
Liberal	Margaret Campbell	11,042	42.10	–1.27
Progressive Conservative	Frank Vasilkioti	8,577	32.70	–2.32
New Democratic	Lukin Robinson	6,029	22.99	+2.78
Libertarian	Marshall Bruce Evoy	293	1.12	–
Communist	Elizabeth Hill	289	1.10	+0.69
Total valid votes		26,230	99.52	
Total rejected ballots		127	0.48	–0.15
Turnout		26,357	60.53	–
Eligible voters		43,547		
Liberal hold		Swing		+0.52
Source: Elections Ontario

Ontario provincial by-election, March 15, 1973 Resignation of Allan Lawrence to enter federal politics
Party	Candidate	Votes	%	±%
Liberal	Margaret Campbell	9,346	43.37	+19.04
Progressive Conservative	Roy McMurtry	7,546	35.02	–20.42
New Democratic	Ellen Adams	4,355	20.21	+1.20
Marxist–Leninist	Hardial Bains	110	0.51	–
Western Guard	John Ross Taylor	104	0.48	–
Communist	Brian Mossop	89	0.41	–
Total valid votes		21,550	99.37	
Total rejected ballots		136	0.63	+0.06
Turnout		21,686	–	–
Eligible voters				
Liberal gain from Progressive Conservative		Swing		+19.73
Source: Elections Ontario

1971 Ontario general election
Party	Candidate	Votes	%	±%
Progressive Conservative	Allan Lawrence	16,916	55.44	+11.27
Liberal	Peter Maloney	7,424	24.33	–8.55
New Democratic	David Middleton	5,801	19.01	–3.95
Independent	James Stuart Bremner	374	1.23	–
Total valid votes		30,515	99.43	
Total rejected ballots		175	0.57	–0.60
Turnout		30,690	67.58	+8.77
Eligible voters		45,412		
Progressive Conservative hold		Swing		+9.91
Source: Elections Ontario

1967 Ontario general election
Party	Candidate	Votes	%	±%
Progressive Conservative	Allan Lawrence	9,708	44.17	–9.69
Liberal	Bruce A. Thomas	7,226	32.88	–0.07
New Democratic	Harry Pope	5,046	22.96	+11.51
Total valid votes		21,980	98.83	
Total rejected ballots		260	1.17	+0.02
Turnout		22,240	58.82	+1.26
Eligible voters		37,813		
Progressive Conservative hold		Swing		–4.81
Source: Elections Ontario

=== 1945 electoral boundaries ===
1963 Ontario general election
Party	Candidate	Votes	%	±%
Progressive Conservative	Allan Lawrence	9,134	53.86	–0.46
Liberal	Vincent P. Reid	5,587	32.94	–0.58
New Democratic	Kenneth (Ken) Hamilton	1,941	11.44	–0.72
Social Credit	Neil Clifford Carmichael	298	1.76	–
Total valid votes		16,960	98.85	
Total rejected ballots		197	1.15	–0.18
Turnout		17,157	57.56	+8.39
Eligible voters		29,807		
Progressive Conservative hold		Swing		+0.06
Source: Elections Ontario

1959 Ontario general election
Party	Candidate	Votes	%	±%
Progressive Conservative	Allan Lawrence	7,960	54.31	–3.97
Liberal	Jean McKenzie Brown	4,913	33.52	+1.47
Co-operative Commonwealth	Iona Samis	1,783	12.17	+3.25
Total valid votes		14,656	98.67	
Total rejected ballots		197	1.33	+0.44
Turnout		14,853	49.17	+16.32
Eligible voters		30,207		
Progressive Conservative hold		Swing		–2.72
Source: Elections Ontario

Ontario provincial by-election, May 12, 1958 Resignation of Dana Porter upon being appointed Chief Justice of the Ontario Court of Appeal
Party	Candidate	Votes	%	±%
Progressive Conservative	Allan Lawrence	5,660	58.28	+3.42
Liberal	Jean McKenzie Brown	3,113	32.06	+6.96
Co-operative Commonwealth	Iona Samis	866	8.92	–11.12
Social Credit	Dorothy Cureatz	72	0.74	–
Total valid votes		9,711	99.11	
Total rejected ballots		87	0.89	–0.27
Turnout		9,798	32.85	–14.79
Eligible voters		29,828		
Progressive Conservative hold		Swing		–1.77
Source: Elections Ontario

1955 Ontario general election
Party	Candidate	Votes	%	±%
Progressive Conservative	Dana Porter	7,593	54.86	–2.00
Liberal	H. Joseph Keenan	3,474	25.10	+6.34
Co-operative Commonwealth	Frank Frier	2,773	20.04	–4.34
Total valid votes		13,840	98.84	
Total rejected ballots		162	1.16	+0.08
Turnout		14,002	47.64	–6.85
Eligible voters		29,394		
Progressive Conservative hold		Swing		–4.17
Source: Elections Ontario

1951 Ontario general election
Party	Candidate	Votes	%	±%
Progressive Conservative	Dana Porter	10,333	56.86	+11.63
Co-operative Commonwealth	Frank Frier	4,429	24.37	–8.79
Liberal	John Harvey Lynes	3,410	18.77	–2.84
Total valid votes		18,172	98.92	
Total rejected ballots		198	1.08	–0.18
Turnout		18,370	54.48	–6.71
Eligible voters		33,718		
Progressive Conservative hold		Swing		+10.21
Source: Elections Ontario

1948 Ontario general election
Party	Candidate	Votes	%	±%
Progressive Conservative	Dana Porter	10,161	45.23	–10.11
Co-operative Commonwealth	Frank Frier	7,450	33.16	+7.20
Liberal	John A. MacVicar	4,853	21.60	+2.91
Total valid votes		22,464	98.74	
Total rejected ballots		286	1.26	+0.27
Turnout		22,750	61.19	–4.29
Eligible voters		37,181		
Progressive Conservative hold		Swing		–8.65
Source: Elections Ontario

1945 Ontario general election
Party	Candidate	Votes	%	±%
Progressive Conservative	Dana Porter	13,153	55.34	+8.54
Co-operative Commonwealth	Bert Carson	6,171	25.97	–2.89
Liberal	Fred H. Needham	4,442	18.69	–2.85
Total valid votes		23,766	99.01	
Total rejected ballots		238	0.99	+0.34
Turnout		24,004	65.48	+16.27
Eligible voters		36,661		
Progressive Conservative hold		Swing		+5.71
Source: Elections Ontario

=== 1934 electoral boundaries ===
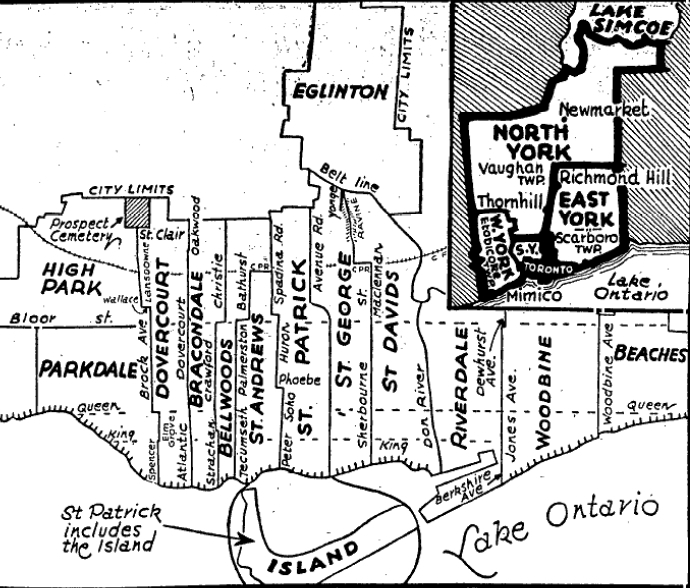
Toronto riding boundaries after 1934 redistribution

1943 Ontario general election
Party	Candidate	Votes	%	±%
Progressive Conservative	Dana Porter	7,205	46.81	+3.99
Co-operative Commonwealth	Andrew Brewin	4,441	28.85	–
Liberal	Walter Thomson	3,316	21.54	–28.27
Soldier	George Victor Black	271	1.76	–
Independent Liberal	E. Douglas Bell	160	1.04	–
Total valid votes		15,393	99.35	
Total rejected ballots		101	0.65	–0.32
Turnout		15,494	49.20	–13.43
Eligible voters		31,490		
Progressive Conservative gain from Liberal		Swing		+16.13
Source: Elections Ontario

1937 Ontario general election
Party	Candidate	Votes	%	±%
Liberal	Ian Strachan	10,071	49.81	+4.32
Conservative	C. Alfred Maguire	8,657	42.82	–0.33
Labour	Jean Laing	1,490	7.37	–
Total valid votes		20,218	99.03	
Total rejected ballots		199	0.97	–0.28
Turnout		20,417	62.63	+0.47
Eligible voters		32,597		
Liberal hold		Swing		+2.33
Source: Elections Ontario

1934 Ontario general election
Party	Candidate	Votes	%	±%
Liberal	Ian Strachan	8,296	45.49	+14.25
Conservative	Henry Scholfield	7,870	43.15	–25.61
Co-operative Commonwealth	W. C. Grant	1,862	10.21	–
Independent	J. J. Carrick	210	1.15	–
Total valid votes		18,238	98.74	
Total rejected ballots		232	1.26	+0.74
Turnout		18,470	62.16	+29.25
Eligible voters		29,712		
Liberal gain from Conservative		Swing		+19.93
Source: Elections Ontario

=== 1926 electoral boundaries ===
1929 Ontario general election
Party	Candidate	Votes	%	±%
Conservative	Henry Scholfield	6,450	68.76	+12.42
Liberal	Janet Needham	2,930	31.24	+26.01
Total valid votes		9,380	99.48	
Total rejected ballots		49	0.52	–0.28
Turnout		9,429	32.92	–33.71
Eligible voters		28,646		
Conservative hold		Swing		–6.80
Source: Elections Ontario

1926 Ontario general election
Party	Candidate	Votes	%
Conservative	Henry Scholfield	7,865	56.34
Prohibitionist	Joseph W. Lowry	2,984	21.38
Independent Conservative	Cecil William Armstrong	1,664	11.92
Liberal	William M. Eadie	729	5.22
Independent Conservative	Edward William James Owens	717	5.14
Total valid votes		13,959	99.20
Total rejected ballots		112	0.80
Turnout		14,071	66.62
Eligible voters		21,121	
Conservative pickup new district.			
Source: Elections Ontario

== See also ==
- List of Ontario provincial electoral districts
- Canadian provincial electoral districts
