= Peter Gow (politician) =

Canadian businessman and politician

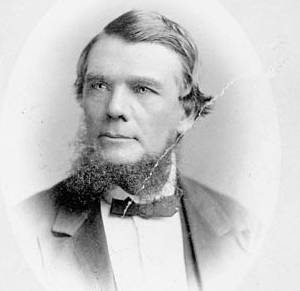

Ontario MPP
- In office 1867–1876
- Preceded by: Riding established
- Succeeded by: James Massie
- Constituency: Wellington South

10th Mayor of Guelph
- In office 1866–1867
- Preceded by: William Clarke
- Succeeded by: Nathaniel Higinbotham

Personal details
- Born: November 20, 1818 Johnstone, Scotland
- Died: February 24, 1886 (aged 67) Guelph, Ontario
- Party: Liberal
- Spouse: Mary Maxwell Smith (m. 1857)
- Children: 6
- Occupation: Businessman

Peter Gow (November 20, 1818 – February 24, 1886) was an Ontario businessman and political figure. He was a member of the Legislative Assembly of Ontario from 1867 to 1876.

== Background ==
He was born in Johnstone, Scotland in 1818, the son of a shoemaker, and came to Brockville in Canada West in 1842. He later moved to Guelph, where he built mills on the Speed River, operated a tannery and produced shoes. He served on the school board and the town council in Guelph; he became reeve in 1857 and served as mayor in 1866 and 1867. He married Mary Maxwell Smith, in 1857 and they had six children.

In 1874, he was elected as the first president of the Ontario Branch of the Royal Caledonian Curling Club.

== Politics ==
In 1867, he was elected to represent Wellington South in the 1st Parliament of Ontario as a Liberal member; he was re-elected in 1871 and 1875. In both those elections, the Conservative Party chose not to run a candidate and Gow was acclaimed. He served as Provincial Secretary and Registrar of Ontario from December 1871 to October 1872. During that time, the Mowat government made the decision to locate the Ontario Agricultural College in Guelph.

=== Electoral history ===
1867 Ontario general election: Wellington South
Party	Candidate	Votes	%
Liberal	Peter Gow	940	58.42
Conservative	Mr. Leslie	669	41.58
Total valid votes		1,609	74.56
Eligible voters		2,158	
Liberal pickup new district.			
Source: Elections Ontario

1871 Ontario general election: Wellington South
Party	Candidate	Votes
Liberal	Peter Gow	Acclaimed
Source: Elections Ontario

Ontario provincial by-election, January 1872: Wellington South Ministerial by-election
Party	Candidate	Votes
Liberal	Peter Gow	Acclaimed
Source: History of the Electoral Districts, Legislatures and Ministries of the Province of Ontario

1875 Ontario general election: Wellington South
Party	Candidate	Votes
Liberal	Peter Gow	Acclaimed
Source: Elections Ontario

=== Cabinet positions ===
Mowat ministry, Province of Ontario (1872–1896)
Cabinet post (1)
Predecessor	Office	Successor
Alexander Mackenzie	Provincial Secretary and Registrar; 1871-1872	Timothy Blair Pardee

== Later life ==
In 1876, he resigned for health reasons and was appointed sheriff for Wellington County, continuing to serve until his death in Guelph in 1886.
