= Wellington (federal electoral district) =

Former federal electoral district in Ontario, Canada

Ontario electoral district

Defunct federal electoral district
- Legislature: House of Commons
- District created: 1966
- District abolished: 1976
- First contested: 1968
- Last contested: 1974

Wellington was a federal electoral district in Ontario, Canada, that was represented in the House of Commons of Canada from 1968 to 1979.

This riding was created in 1966 from parts of Wellington South and Wentworth ridings. It consisted of the City of Guelph and the Townships of Eramosa, Guelph and Puslinch in the County of Wellington; and the Township of Beverly in the County of Wentworth. It was abolished in 1979 when it was merged into Guelph riding.

== Members of Parliament ==
Parliament	Years	Member	Party
Riding created from Wellington South and Wentworth
28th	1968–1972	Alfred Hales	Progressive Conservative
29th	1972–1974	Alfred Hales	Progressive Conservative
30th	1974–1979	Frank Maine	Liberal
Riding dissolved into Guelph

== Election results ==
1974 Canadian federal election
Party	Candidate	Votes	%	±%
Liberal	Frank W. Maine	18,171	46.2	+18.0
Progressive Conservative	Bruce Ernest Payne	14,099	35.9	-17.2
New Democratic	W. Gerald Punnett	6,165	15.7	-2.4
Independent	Walter A. Tucker	592	1.5	+1.5
Communist	Gareth Blythe	124	0.3	-0.1
Libertarian	Brian Seymour	89	0.2	+0.2
Marxist–Leninist	Terry Theriault	58	0.2	0.0
Total valid votes		39,298	100.0	

1972 Canadian federal election
Party	Candidate	Votes	%	±%
Progressive Conservative	Alfred Dryden Hales	20,730	53.1	+8.6
Liberal	Jake Slinger	11,022	28.2	-10.8
New Democratic	Margaret McCready	7,050	18.1	+1.6
Communist	Gareth Blythe	174	0.4	+0.4
Marxist–Leninist	Terry Theriault	67	0.2	+0.2
Total valid votes		39,043	100.0	

1968 Canadian federal election
Party	Candidate	Votes	%	±%
Progressive Conservative	Alfred Dryden Hales	13,496	44.5	
Liberal	Ralph Dent	11,842	39.0	
New Democratic	Phil Lanthier	5,012	16.5	
Total valid votes		30,350	100.0	

== See also ==
- List of Canadian electoral districts
- Historical federal electoral districts of Canada
