= Wellington South (provincial electoral district) =

Former provincial electoral district in Ontario, Canada

Ontario electoral district

Defunct provincial electoral district
- Legislature: Legislative Assembly of Ontario
- District created: 1867
- District abolished: 1986
- First contested: 1867
- Last contested: 1985

Wellington South was a provincial electoral district in Ontario, Canada. It was created in 1867 at the time of confederation and was abolished in 1986 before the 1987 election.

== Members of Provincial Parliament ==
Wellington South
Assembly	Years	Member	Party
1st	1867–1871	Peter Gow	Liberal
2nd	1871–1874	Peter Gow	Liberal
3rd	1875–1876	Peter Gow	Liberal
3rd	1876–1879	James Massie	Liberal
4th	1879–1883	James Laidlaw	Liberal
5th	1883–1886	James Laidlaw	Liberal
6th	1886–1890	Donald Guthrie	Liberal
7th	1890–1894	Donald Guthrie	Liberal
8th	1894–1898	John Mutrie	Liberal
9th	1898–1902	John Mutrie	Liberal
10th	1902–1904	Joseph Patrick Downey	Conservative
11th	1905–1908	Joseph Patrick Downey	Conservative
12th	1908–1910	Joseph Patrick Downey	Conservative
12th	1910–1911	John Ransom Howitt	Conservative
13th	1911–1914	Henry Scholfield	Conservative
14th	1914–1919	Samuel Carter	Liberal-Prohibitionist
15th	1919–1923	Caleb Henry Buckland	Conservative
16th	1923–1926	Lincoln Goldie	Conservative
17th	1926–1929	Lincoln Goldie	Conservative
18th	1929–1931	Lincoln Goldie	Conservative
18th	1931–1934	Duncan Paul Munro	Liberal
19th	1934–1934	Duncan Paul Munro	Liberal
19th	1934–1937	James Harold King	Liberal
20th	1937–1943	James Harold King	Liberal
21st	1943–1945	Leslie Hancock	Co-operative Commonwealth
22nd	1945–1948	William Ernest Hamilton	Progressive Conservative
23rd	1948–1951	William Ernest Hamilton	Progressive Conservative
24th	1951–1955	William Ernest Hamilton	Progressive Conservative
25th	1955–1959	Harry Worton	Liberal
26th	1959–1963	Harry Worton	Liberal
27th	1963–1967	Harry Worton	Liberal
28th	1967–1971	Harry Worton	Liberal
29th	1971–1975	Harry Worton	Liberal
30th	1975–1977	Harry Worton	Liberal
31st	1977–1981	Harry Worton	Liberal
32nd	1981–1985	Harry Worton	Liberal
33rd	1985–1987	Rick Ferraro	Liberal
Sourced from the Ontario Legislative Assembly
Merged into Guelph before the 1987 election

== Election results ==
1867 Ontario general election
Party	Candidate	Votes	%
Liberal	Peter Gow	940	58.42
Conservative	Mr. Leslie	669	41.58
Total valid votes		1,609	74.56
Eligible voters		2,158	
Liberal pickup new district.			
Source: Elections Ontario

1871 Ontario general election
Party	Candidate	Votes
Liberal	Peter Gow	Acclaimed
Source: Elections Ontario

Ontario provincial by-election, January 1872 Ministerial by-election
Party	Candidate	Votes
Liberal	Peter Gow	Acclaimed
Source: History of the Electoral Districts, Legislatures and Ministries of the Province of Ontario

1875 Ontario general election
Party	Candidate	Votes
Liberal	Peter Gow	Acclaimed
Source: Elections Ontario

Ontario provincial by-election, September 1876 Resignation of Peter Gow
Party	Candidate	Votes
Liberal	James Massie	Acclaimed
Source: History of the Electoral Districts, Legislatures and Ministries of the Province of Ontario

1879 Ontario general election
Party	Candidate	Votes	%
Liberal	James Laidlaw	1,430	52.15
Conservative	W.F. Sweetman	1,312	47.85
Total valid votes		2,742	65.83
Eligible voters		4,165	
Liberal hold			
Source: Elections Ontario

== See also ==
- List of Ontario provincial electoral districts
- Canadian provincial electoral districts
