= Christian Kloepfer =

Canadian politician

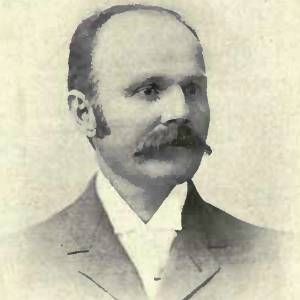
Christian Kloepfer

Christian Kloepfer (22 December 1847 – 9 February 1913) was a wholesale merchant and political figure in Ontario, Canada. He represented Wellington South in the House of Commons of Canada from 1896 to 1900 as a Conservative.

He was born in New Germany, Waterloo County, Canada West, the son of German immigrants. Kloepfer sold hardware for carriages. In 1880, he married Elizabeth Murray. Kloepfer ran unsuccessfully for reelection in 1900 and 1904. He served as a member of the municipal council for Guelph. Kloepfer was a director of the Traders Bank of Canada. He died in Guelph at the age of 65.

== Electoral record ==
1896 Canadian federal election: Wellington South
Party	Candidate	Votes	%	±%
Conservative	Christian Kloepfer	2,578	51.4	5.4
Liberal	James Innes	2,440	48.6	-5.4
Total valid votes		5,018	100.0	

1900 Canadian federal election: Wellington South
Party	Candidate	Votes	%	±%
Liberal	Hugh Guthrie	2,755	51.0	2.4
Conservative	Christian Kloepfer	2,649	49.0	-2.4
Total valid votes		5,404	100.0	

1904 Canadian federal election: Wellington South
Party	Candidate	Votes	%	±%
Liberal	Hugh Guthrie	3,694	52.7	1.7
Conservative	Christian Kloepfer	3,315	47.3	-1.7
Total valid votes		7,009	100.0	
