= John Mutrie =

Canadian politician (1846–1928)

Ontario MPP
- In office 1894–1902
- Preceded by: Donald Guthrie
- Succeeded by: Joseph Patrick Downey
- Constituency: Wellington South

Personal details
- Born: 1846 Eramosa Township, Canada West
- Died: June 19, 1928 (aged 81–82)
- Party: Liberal
- Spouse(s): Margaret Dow (m. 1873) Margaret Allan
- Children: 4
- Occupation: Farmer

John Mutrie (1846 – June 19, 1928) was an Ontario farmer and political figure. He represented Wellington South in the Legislative Assembly of Ontario as a Liberal member from 1894 to 1902.

He was born in Eramosa Township, Canada West, the son of William Mutrie, an immigrant from Scotland, and was educated there. Mutrie served on the township council, serving as reeve from 1884 to 1892, and on the council for Wellington County. Mutrie was county warden in 1890 and 1891. He served in the local militia, reaching the rank of lieutenant-colonel. Mutrie was recruiting officer at Guelph at the beginning of World War I. He was also postmaster at Rockwood and served as a justice of the peace.

Mutrie married Margaret Dow in 1873; they had four children. He later married Margaret Allan.
