= David Stirton =

Canadian politician

David Stirton (June 13, 1816 – August 16, 1908) was a Liberal member of the House of Commons of Canada representing Wellington South from 1867 to 1876.

He was born in Angus, Scotland in 1816, the son of James Stirton. His family settled near the current site of Guelph, Ontario in Upper Canada around 1827. Stirton bought his own farm in 1841. He served as reeve for Puslinch Township from 1853 to 1857 and was captain in the local militia. He represented South Wellington in the Legislative Assembly of the Province of Canada from 1858 to 1867. He was elected in the same riding following Confederation and served until 1876, when he was appointed postmaster for Guelph. Stirton died in Guelph at the age of 92.

== Electoral record ==
1867 Canadian federal election: Wellington South
Party	Candidate	Votes	%	±%
Liberal	David Stirton	963	59.6	
Unknown	F. W. Stone	652	40.4	
Total valid votes		1,615	100.0	

1872 Canadian federal election: Wellington South
Party	Candidate	Votes
Liberal	David Stirton	acclaimed
Source: Canadian Elections Database

1874 Canadian federal election: Wellington South
Party	Candidate	Votes	%	±%
Liberal	David Stirton	1,667	78.1	
Unknown	H. Hatch	468	21.9	
Total valid votes		2,135	100.0	
Source: lop.parl.ca
