= Joseph Downey (Ontario politician) =

Canadian politician

Joseph Patrick Downey

Ontario MPP
- In office 1902–1911
- Preceded by: John Mutrie
- Succeeded by: Henry Scholfield
- Constituency: Wellington South

Personal details
- Born: January 17, 1865 Puslinch Township, Canada West
- Died: 1926 (aged 60–61) Orillia, Ontario
- Party: Conservative
- Spouse: Ellen Josephine Coghlan (m. 1893)
- Occupation: Journalist

Joseph Patrick Downey (January 17, 1865 – 1926) was an Ontario journalist and political figure. He represented Wellington South in the Legislative Assembly of Ontario from 1902 to 1911 as a Conservative member.

He was born in Puslinch Township, Canada West, the son of Patrick Downey. He served as editor for the Guelph Herald from 1885 to 1907. Downey married Ellen Josephine Coghlan in 1893. In 1910, he was appointed superintendent for the Ontario Asylum for Idiots (later the Huronia Regional Centre). Downey died in Orillia in 1926.
