= Henry Scholfield =

Canadian politician

Ontario MPP
- In office 1926–1934
- Preceded by: Riding established
- Succeeded by: Ian Strachan
- Constituency: St. George
- In office 1911–1914
- Preceded by: Joseph Patrick Downey
- Succeeded by: Samuel Carter
- Constituency: Wellington South

Personal details
- Born: September 19, 1866 Lloydtown, Canada West
- Died: September 4, 1935 (aged 68) Toronto, Ontario
- Party: Conservative
- Occupation: Banker

Henry Chadwick Scholfield (September 19, 1866 - September 4, 1935) was a Canadian politician, who represented the electoral districts of Wellington South from 1911 to 1914, and St. George from 1926 to 1934, in the Legislative Assembly of Ontario. He was a member of the Ontario Conservative Party.

Born in Lloydtown, Ontario, he worked for The Dominion Bank in his youth, eventually becoming manager of a branch in Guelph. While residing there, he was elected as MPP for Wellington South in the 1911 election. He subsequently became cofounder and vice-president of Page-Hersey and Company, moving to Toronto as the company expanded its operations. He was elected to the legislature as MPP for St. George's in the 1926 election, and was reelected in the 1929 election. In his final term in the legislature he served as a minister without portfolio in the government of George Henry.

After retiring from politics in 1934, Scholfield suffered a heart attack in late August 1935, and died ten days later at his home in Toronto.
