= Henry Alfred Hosking =

Canadian politician

Member of Parliament for Wellington South
- In office June 1949 – June 1957
- Preceded by: Robert Gladstone
- Succeeded by: Alfred Hales

Personal details
- Born: Henry Alfred Hosking; 6 August 1908 Bellows Falls, Vermont, United States
- Died: 3 June 1957 (aged 48) Guelph, Ontario
- Party: Liberal
- Spouse(s): Muriel Peart (m. 14 July 1934)
- Profession: garage owner-operator, mechanical engineer, merchant

Henry Alfred Hosking (6 August 1908 – 3 June 1957) was a Liberal party member of the House of Commons of Canada. He was born in Bellows Falls, Vermont, United States and moved with his family to Canada, at Rockwood, Ontario later in his birth year.

He attended Guelph Collegiate Vocational Institute then Queen's University where he graduated with a Bachelor of Science in 1933. His career included jobs as a mechanical engineer, a merchant and president of Hosking Motors.

During World War II, he served with the Canadian Army's Canadian Military Engineers. In 1948 and 1949, he was a city councillor for Guelph City Council.

Hosking was first elected to Parliament at the Wellington South riding in the 1949 general election then re-elected for a second term in 1953.

In April 1957, Hosking was en route to Ottawa when he fell ill. He was taken off the train at Oshawa station and sent to Toronto Wellesley Hospital where he received an operation. In late May, he was admitted to Guelph's St. Joseph's Hospital with symptoms of pancreatitis. Hosking died there on 3 June 1957, one week before the federal election in which he was registered as a candidate. As a result, the vote at Wellington South was delayed until 15 July in order to establish a new set of nominees for the riding.

== Electoral record ==
1949 Canadian federal election: Wellington South
Party	Candidate	Votes	%	±%
Liberal	Henry Alfred Hosking	10,344	47.3	2.1
Progressive Conservative	G. Ernest Robertson	7,778	35.6	-5.2
Co-operative Commonwealth	Charles Franklin Leaman	3,748	17.1	4.5
Total valid votes		21,870	100.0	

1953 Canadian federal election: Wellington South
Party	Candidate	Votes	%	±%
Liberal	Henry Alfred Hosking	9,275	45.4	-1.9
Progressive Conservative	Alfred Hales	8,722	42.7	7.1
Co-operative Commonwealth	Thomas L. Withers	2,431	11.9	-5.2
Total valid votes		20,428	100.0	
