= Frank Maine =

Canadian politician (1937–2018)

Francis William (Frank) Maine

Member of Parliament for Wellington
- In office July 1974 – March 1979

Personal details
- Born: 15 September 1937 Hayes, England
- Died: 29 September 2018 (aged 81) Guelph, Ontario, Canada
- Party: Liberal
- Profession: Consultant, professional engineer, research chemist, scientist

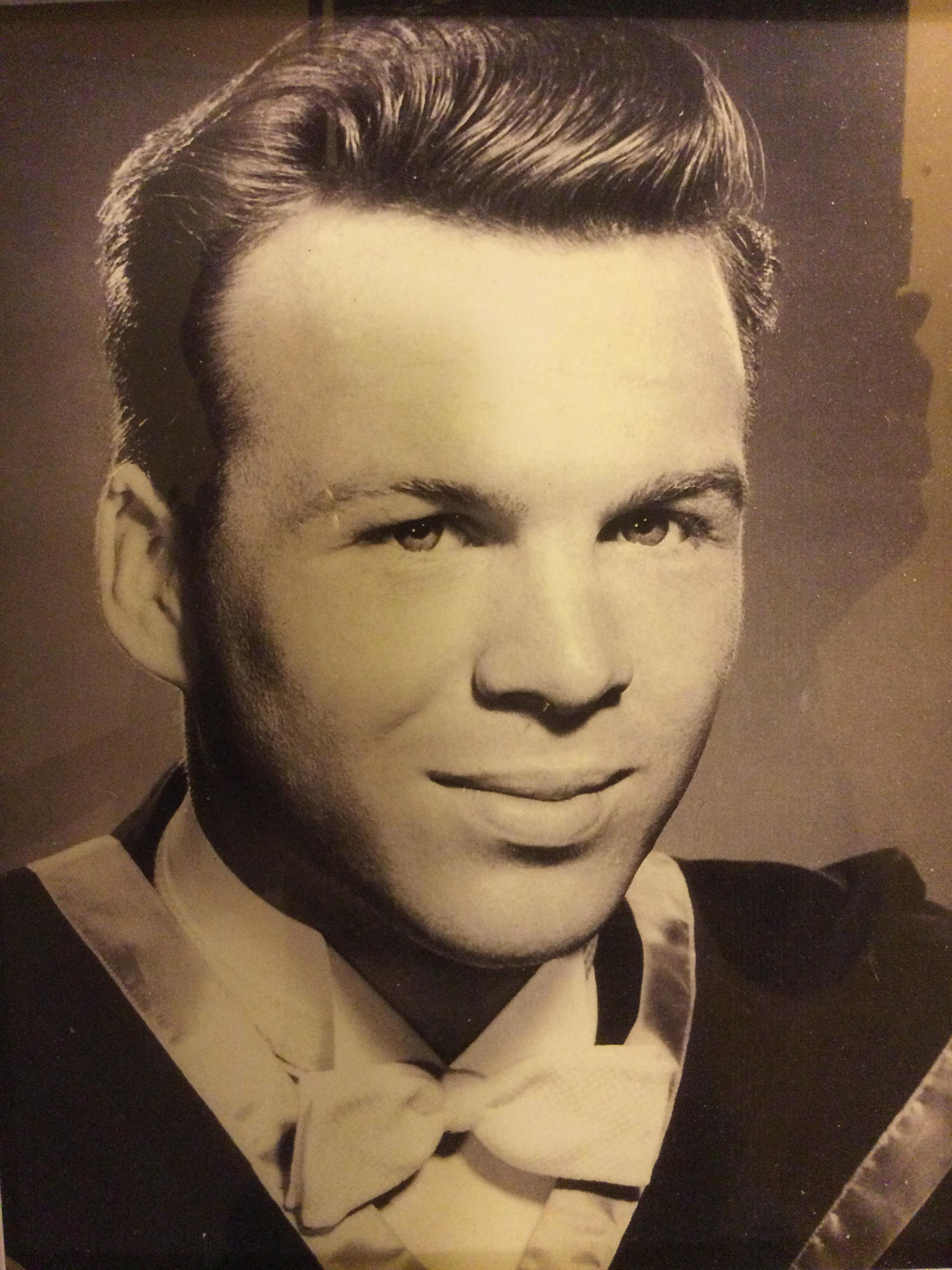
Frank Maine graduation photo

Francis William Maine (15 September 1937 – 29 September 2018) was a Canadian chemical engineer, a scientist, entrepreneur, and politician who was a member of the Liberal Party of Canada. He was his party's representative in the House of Commons of Canada. Along with serving as a Member of Parliament, Maine served as Parliamentary Secretary to the Minister of State for Science and Technology.

Maine immigrated to Canada from England at the age of 10, and studied Engineering Chemistry at Queen's University. Awarded an Athlone Fellowship, he studied chemistry at the University of Cambridge, earning his PhD. While at Cambridge, Maine earned his Blue as captain of the University of Cambridge Judo team, also competing for Britain. Upon returning to Canada, he worked as a polymer chemist, and became head of Reinforced Plastics R&D at Fibreglass Canada.

He was elected at the Wellington riding in the 1974 general election, serving in the 30th Canadian Parliament. A key issue for Maine was the role science and innovation policy could play in building Canada's knowledge economy. Following realignment of ridings, Maine was defeated at the Guelph electoral district in the 1979 federal election by Albert Fish of the Progressive Conservative party. Maine ran for federal Parliament again at the Guelph—Wellington riding, this time as an independent candidate in the 1993 election, but was defeated.

After politics, Maine returned to plastics and composites R&D, but this time as a scientist-entrepreneur. He co-invented and commercialized oriented polymer products. He also served on the Science Council of Canada.

He died on Sept 29, 2018 in Guelph, leaving behind his wife of nearly 60 years, Mary-Eva Maine, 4 children, and 6 grandchildren.

His daughter is academic Elicia Maine. His granddaughter is cyclist Katherine Maine.
