= James Innes (Canadian politician) =

Canadian politician

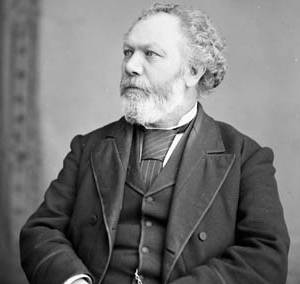
James Innes Source: Library and Archives Canada

James Innes (February 1, 1833 – July 16, 1903) was a Scottish-born journalist, businessman and political figure in Ontario, Canada. He represented Wellington South in the House of Commons of Canada from 1882 to 1896 as a Liberal member.

He was born in Huntly, Aberdeenshire, the son of Alexander Innes and Elsbeth Fordyce, taught school in Scotland for five years and arrived in Canada West in 1853. He was a reporter for the Globe and British Colonist in Toronto and the Morning Banner in Hamilton. In 1861, he became the editor for the Guelph Advertiser. He became co-owner of the Guelph Weekly Mercury in 1862. In 1873, he merged that paper with the Advertiser to form the Guelph Mercury and Advertiser. Innes married Helen Gerrard in 1873. He served on the local board of education and became chairman in 1882. Innes was also president of the Dominion Life Assurance Company and helped form the Guelph Junction Railway. He died of pneumonia in Sydney, Nova Scotia at the age of 70 while travelling in eastern Canada.

== Electoral record ==
1882 Canadian federal election: Wellington South
Party	Candidate	Votes	%	±%
Liberal	James Innes	1,790	51.7	-2.8
Conservative	James Goldie	1,672	48.3	2.8
Total valid votes		3,462	100.0	

1887 Canadian federal election: Wellington South
Party	Candidate	Votes	%	±%
Liberal	James Innes	2,411	51.3	-0.4
Conservative	James Goldie	2,285	48.7	0.4
Total valid votes		4,696	100.0	

1891 Canadian federal election: Wellington South
Party	Candidate	Votes	%	±%
Liberal	James Innes	2,510	54.0	2.7
Conservative	James Goldie	2,134	46.0	-2.7
Total valid votes		4,644	100.0	

1896 Canadian federal election: Wellington South
Party	Candidate	Votes	%	±%
Conservative	Christian Kloepfer	2,578	51.4	5.4
Liberal	James Innes	2,440	48.6	-5.4
Total valid votes		5,018	100.0	
