= Adam Fergusson =

Adam Fergusson may refer to:

- Adam Fergusson (Upper Canada politician) (1783–1862), early Canadian politician
- Sir Adam Fergusson, 3rd Baronet (1733–1813), British Member of Parliament for Ayrshire and Edinburgh
- Adam Fergusson (MEP) (born 1932), Member of European Parliament for Strathclyde East, 1979–1984
- Adam Johnston Fergusson Blair (1815–1867), known prior to 1862 as Adam Johnston Fergusson, Canadian colonial-era politician

== See also ==
- Adam Ferguson (disambiguation)
