= Irvine Creek (Ontario) =

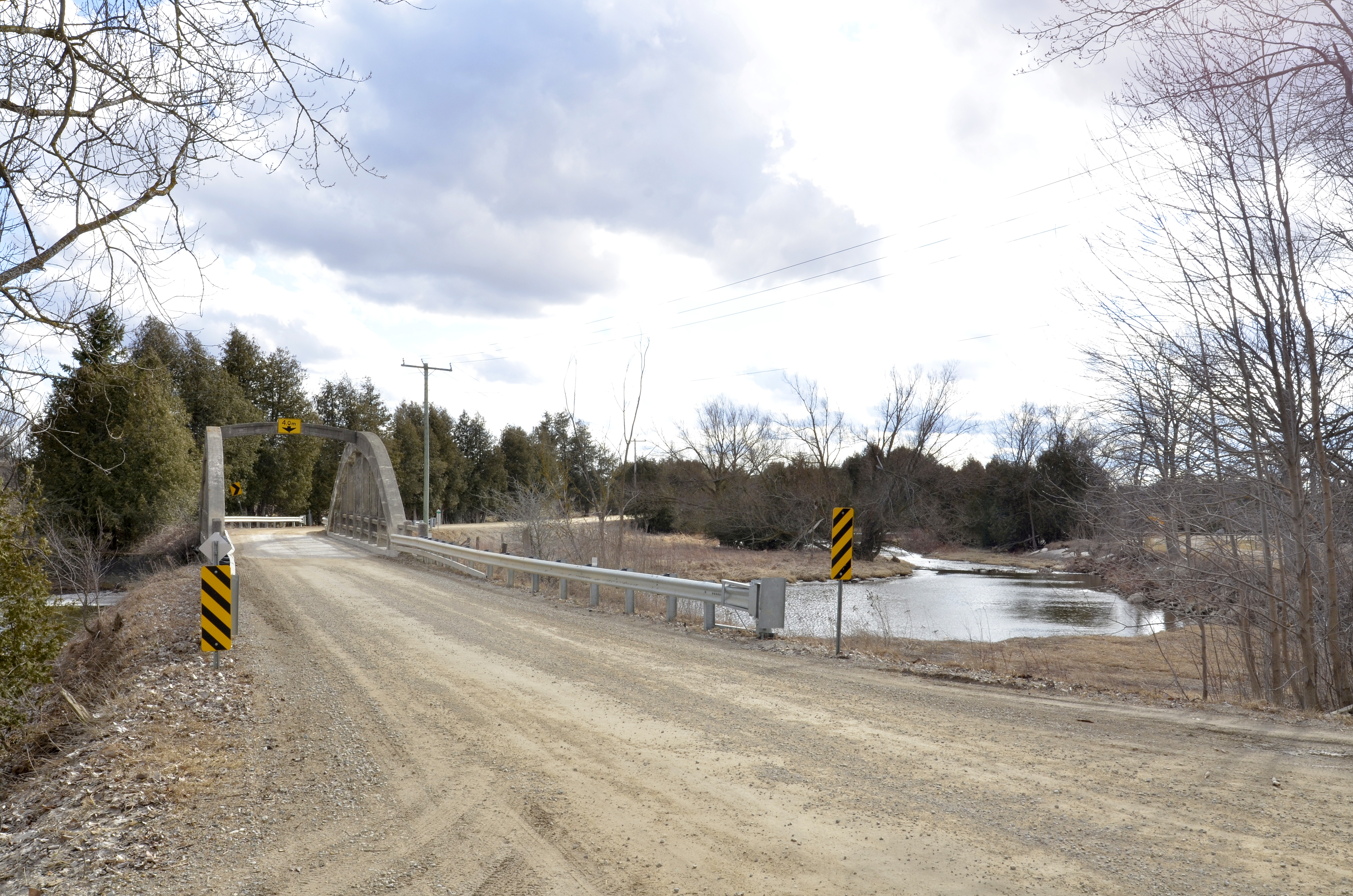
- Sideroad 15 over Irvine Creek at Living Springs

- Location of the mouth in southern Ontario

Location
- Country: Canada
- Province: Ontario
- Region: Southwestern Ontario
- County: Wellington
- Municipality: Centre Wellington

Physical characteristics
- Source confluence: Unnamed field
  - location: West Garafraxa township
  - coordinates: 43°49′15″N 80°23′33″W
  - elevation: 453 m (1,486 ft)
- Mouth: Grand River
  - location: Elora
  - coordinates: 43°40′54″N 80°26′07″W
  - elevation: 366 m (1,201 ft)

Basin features
- River system: Great Lakes Basin

The Irvine River (solely correct pronunciation: ˈɝ.vɪn) is a creek in the municipality of Centre Wellington, Wellington County in southwestern Ontario, Canada. It is in the Great Lakes Basin and is a right tributary of the Grand River.

The creek begins at the confluence of two unnamed tributary streams in geographic West Garafraxa Township near the settlement of Dracon and flows southeast towards Lake Belwood. Before reaching the lake, it then turns southwest, then northwest and reaches the settlement of Living Springs. It turns southwest, passes under Ontario Highway 6, enters geographic Nichol Township, and reaches the community of Salem. The creek then flows southwest and reaches its mouth at the Grand River at the community of Elora. The Grand River flows to Lake Erie.

== See also ==
- David Street Bridge - a vehicular bridge that crosses over Irvine Creek.
