= James Webster (Canada West politician) =

James Webster (May 28, 1808 – February 6, 1869) was a Scottish-born political figure in Canada West. He represented West Halton and then Waterloo in the Legislative Assembly of the Province of Canada from 1844 to 1848 as a Conservative.

He was born in Balruddery, Forfar, the son of James Webster, and came to Upper Canada in 1833. With Adam Fergusson, Webster founded the village of Fergus. He was named a commissioner for Nichol Township in 1835 and later served as a district councillor for the township; he was also a commissioner for the Court of Requests. Webster married Margaret Wilson in 1838. His reelection to the provincial assembly in 1848 was appealed by Fergusson Blair and Webster did not run for reelection. In 1852, he moved to Guelph. Webster ran for the North Wellington seat in 1857 and again in an 1859 by-election but was unsuccessful. He was elected mayor of Guelph in 1859. Later that same year, he was appointed registrar for Wellington County. Webster also served in the local militia, reaching the rank of lieutenant-colonel.
