= Salem, Wellington County, Ontario =

Salem
- Compact Rural Community
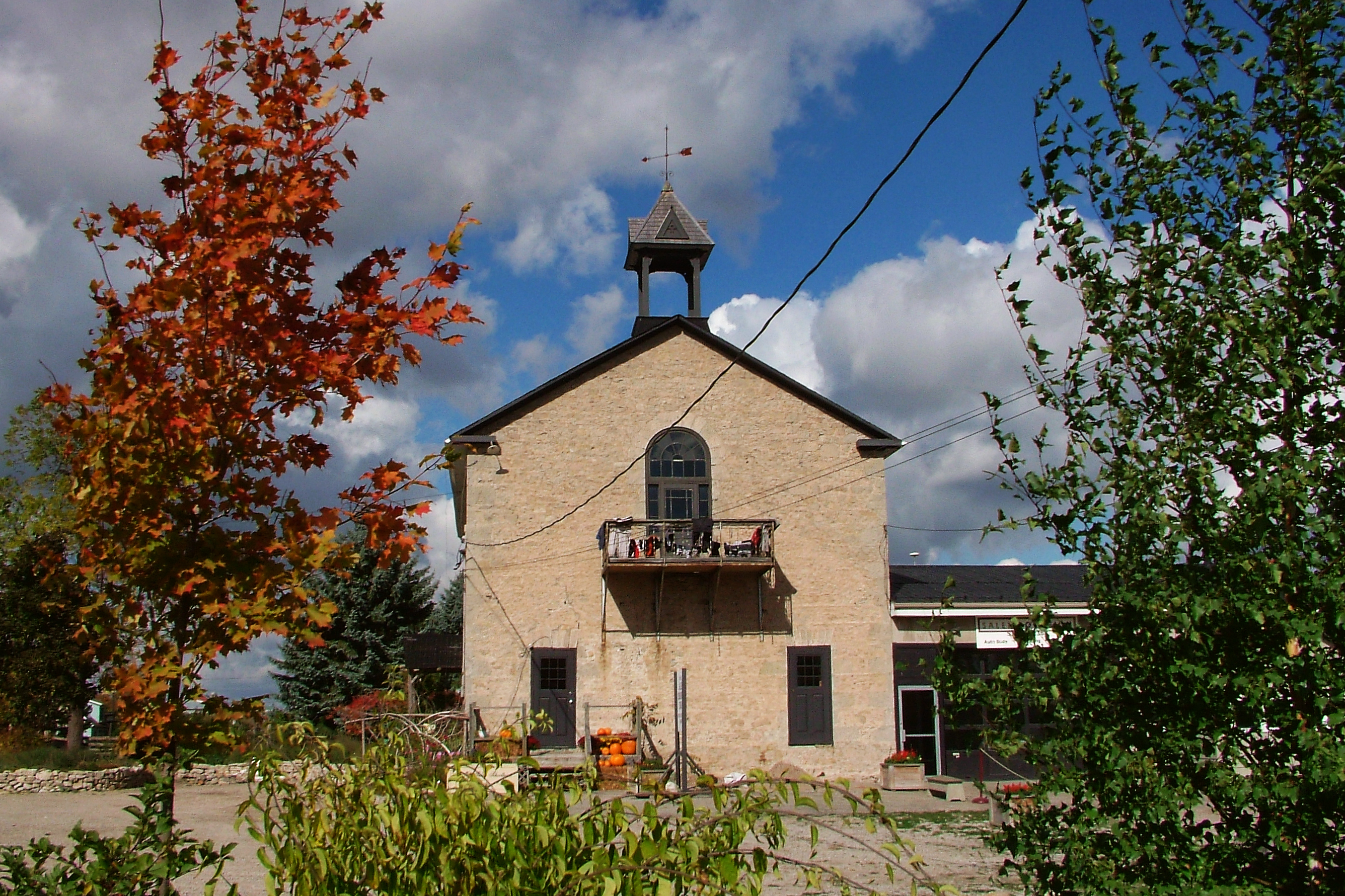
- Original school house in Salem.

- Location in southern Ontario Salem (Southern Ontario)
- Coordinates: 43°41′36″N 80°26′49″W
- Country: Canada
- Province: Ontario
- County: Wellington County
- Township: Centre Wellington
- Elevation: 400 m (1,300 ft)
- Time zone: UTC-5 (EST)
  - Summer (DST): UTC-4 (EDT)
- Forward sortation area: N0G 1S0
- Area codes: 519, 226, 548
- NTS Map: 040P09
- GNBC Code: FDTDG

Salem is a compact rural community and unincorporated place in the incorporated township of Centre Wellington, Wellington County, in southwestern Ontario, Canada.

== History ==
Salem was founded by Sem Wissler. Wissler purchased the land (in what was then Nichol Township) for the settlement in 1844, with the first building being constructed in 1845. He was born in Clay Township, Lancaster County, Pennsylvania and participated in the Pennsylvania German migration to Waterloo County, Ontario which occurred in the early 19th century. Wissler, of German descent, married a relative of one of the Scottish settlers of nearby Bon Accord. He considered Irvine Creek to have potential and chose land near to it to settle.

By the 1850s, a businessman named William Tamblyn was active, operating a lime kiln and constructing a number of buildings. He opened a brewery at Salem in 1857 or 1858, which was eventually taken over by Conrad Doerbecker in 1865. A German-born professional brewer, Doerbecker may have previously operated the brewery for Tamblyn. Doerbecker produced lighter, lager-style beers which competed with the English-style ales produced by the brewery in Elora.

Doerbecker, who also owned a brick-making business, soon had a new brewery building constructed in 1867 out of brick. The brewing business in Salem went through significant changes over the next few decades, as Doerbecker at first sold his brewery to a former employee named Jacob Reuter in 1868, before opening a new brewery, known as the Irvine Brewery, in 1872. The two competed alongside the Dalby brewery in Elora.

Doerbecker (and later his son, Mike) sought to expand to a regional market in Waterloo and Wellington counties, where they distributed with a fleet of wagons. However, by the 1890s, the brewing industry in Ontario was becoming heavily consolidated even as beer consumption increased. The Irvine Brewery was competing with Waterloo's Huether and Kuntz breweries, as well as the Sleeman Brewery in Guelph. However, financial problems drove it toward acquisition by the Kuntz brewing company in 1910, which shut it down and ended Salem's commercial brewing history, as well as ending its last major industry.

The small village of Salem has since merged geographically with its much larger southeastern neighbour, the Historic Village of Elora, although longtime residents of the area still distinguish between the two as of the year 2023.

== Economy ==
Local business area in Salem is mainly found along and near Woolwich Street (County Road) and County Road 7 including:

- Esso gas station with convenience store
- Ontario Potato Board office
- Mirage Limousine
- Salem Collision
- Deboer's Farm Equipment
- Burns Motorsports
- Artech Millwright
- Shantz Automotive

== Transportation ==
Salem has two bridges that span over Irvine Creek:

- Pratt truss bridge carrying Woolwich Street West: paved single lane in each direction with single sided sidewalk for pedestrians on northside
- Concrete beam bridge carried unpaved Washington Street: requiring traffic to yield as bridge too narrow to carry two way traffic. This bridge has been closed to vehicular traffic and is now pedestrian only.

Wellington County Road 7 and Wellington County Road 10 (Woolwich Street West and Geddes Street) are then main primary roads connecting Salem with other communities. Most of the roads in Salem are gravel other than the two aforementioned county roads. Within Salem there is one traffic light at Woolwich and Wellington County Road 7 with all other intersections controlled by stop signs.

== Education ==
Salem Public School is the only school situated in Salem and belongs to the Upper Grand District School Board. Secondary students need to travel to Fergus, Ontario to attend Centre Wellington District High School.

The old Salem School House at 93 Woolwich Street West (Woolwich Street and Wellington County Road 7) has been home to many businesses since the school moved to its current location on Woolwich Street East. In recent years it has been home to Old Soul Resale Furniture and Art, Strata Gallery, Soulworks Studio, and Shades4U.

The nearest Catholic school (within the Wellington Catholic District School Board) is St. Mary's Catholic School in Elora Ontario. The closest Catholic high school is found in Guelph, Ontario.

== Recreation ==
Recreation facilities located within Salem are largely passive, and include Veteran's Park.

== Neighbourhoods ==
Most residents live along the areas along Irvine Creek and is known for its many historic stone houses. In recent years, Salem's size has grown due to an urban development on William Street, between Water Street and Victoria Street.

== Places of worship ==
- Grand River Community Church - Evangelical Baptist
- Canadian Reformed Church of Elora
