= Adam Ferguson (disambiguation) =

Adam Ferguson (1723–1816), Scottish philosopher and historian, "the father of modern sociology".

Adam Ferguson may also refer to:

- Sir Adam Ferguson (British Army officer) (1771–1855), his son, keeper of the regalia in Scotland
- Adam Ferguson (photographer) (born 1978), Australian freelance photojournalist

== See also ==
- Adam Fergusson (disambiguation)
