= Living Springs, Ontario =

Living Springs
- Unincorporated rural community
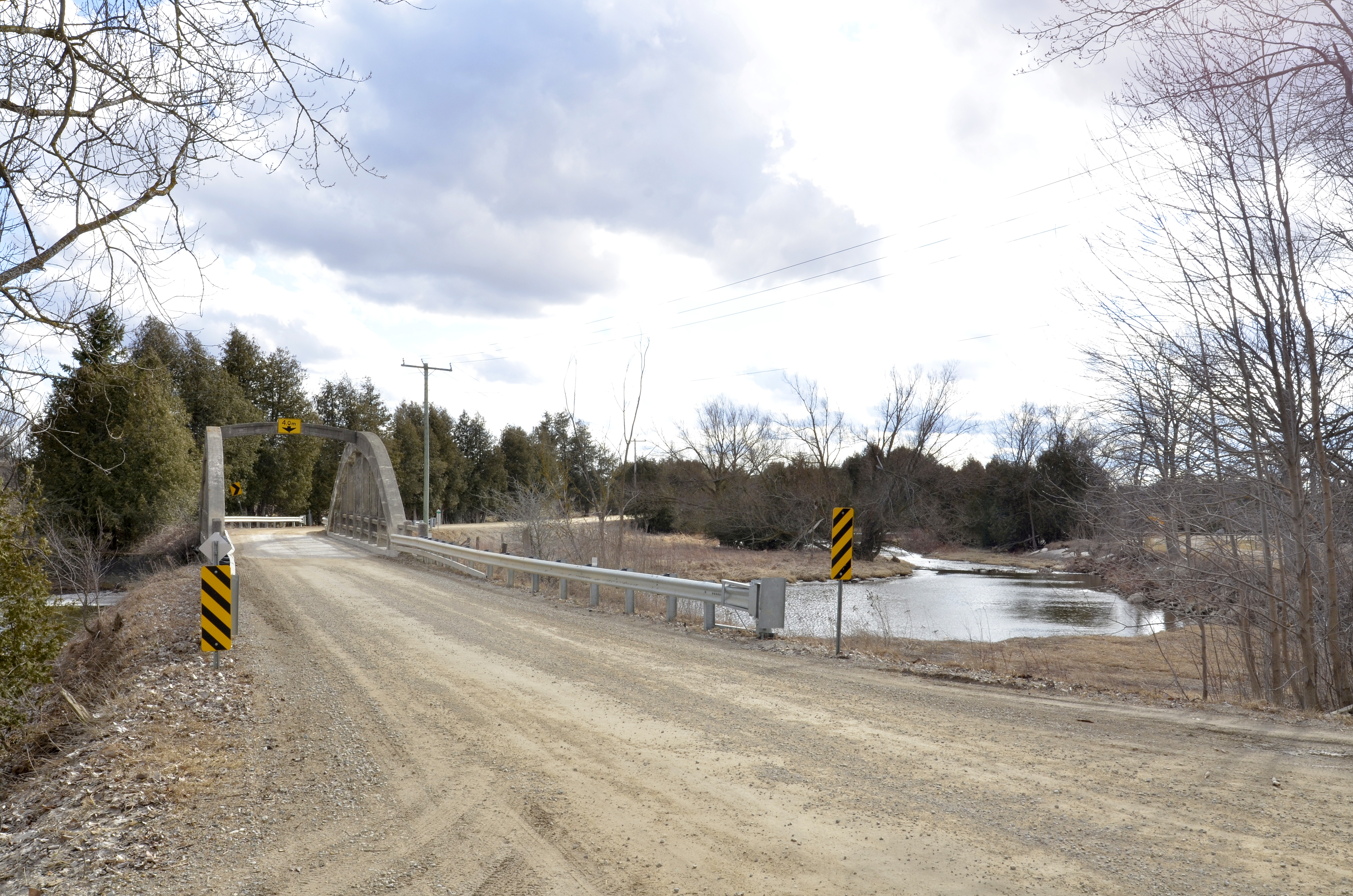
- Sideroad 15 at Irvine Creek in Living Springs, 2017

- Location within Canada Location within Ontario
- Coordinates: 43°45′28″N 80°24′08″W
- Country: Canada
- Province: Ontario
- County: Wellington
- Township: Centre Wellington
- Time zone: UTC-5 (Eastern (EST))
  - Summer (DST): UTC-4 (EDT)
- GNBC Code: FBZWY

Living Springs is an unincorporated rural community in Centre Wellington Township, Wellington County, Ontario, Canada. The settlement was part of West Garafraxa Township until 1999.

Irvine Creek flows through the settlement.

== History ==
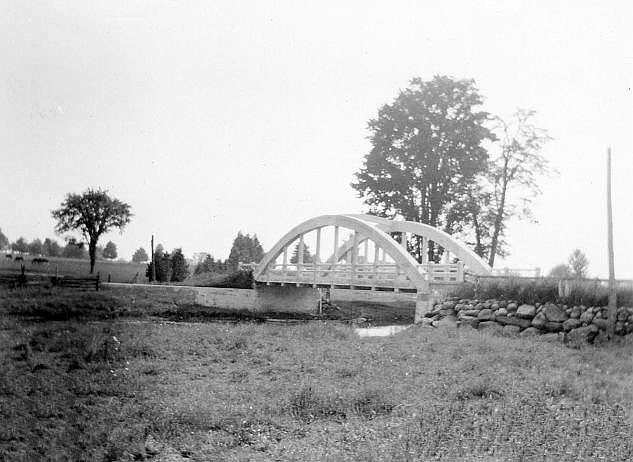
Reinforced concrete bowstring arch bridge over Irvine Creek in Living Springs, 1937

A post office was located in Living Springs from 1885 to 1914.

The settlement had a school in 1908, and semi-weekly stage coach service in 1910.

A chapter of the Federated Women's Institutes of Ontario was located in Living Springs from 1925 to 1995.

Prior to the 1930s, a shingle mill was located at the settlement.
