= Spier, Ontario =

Spier
- Unincorporated rural community
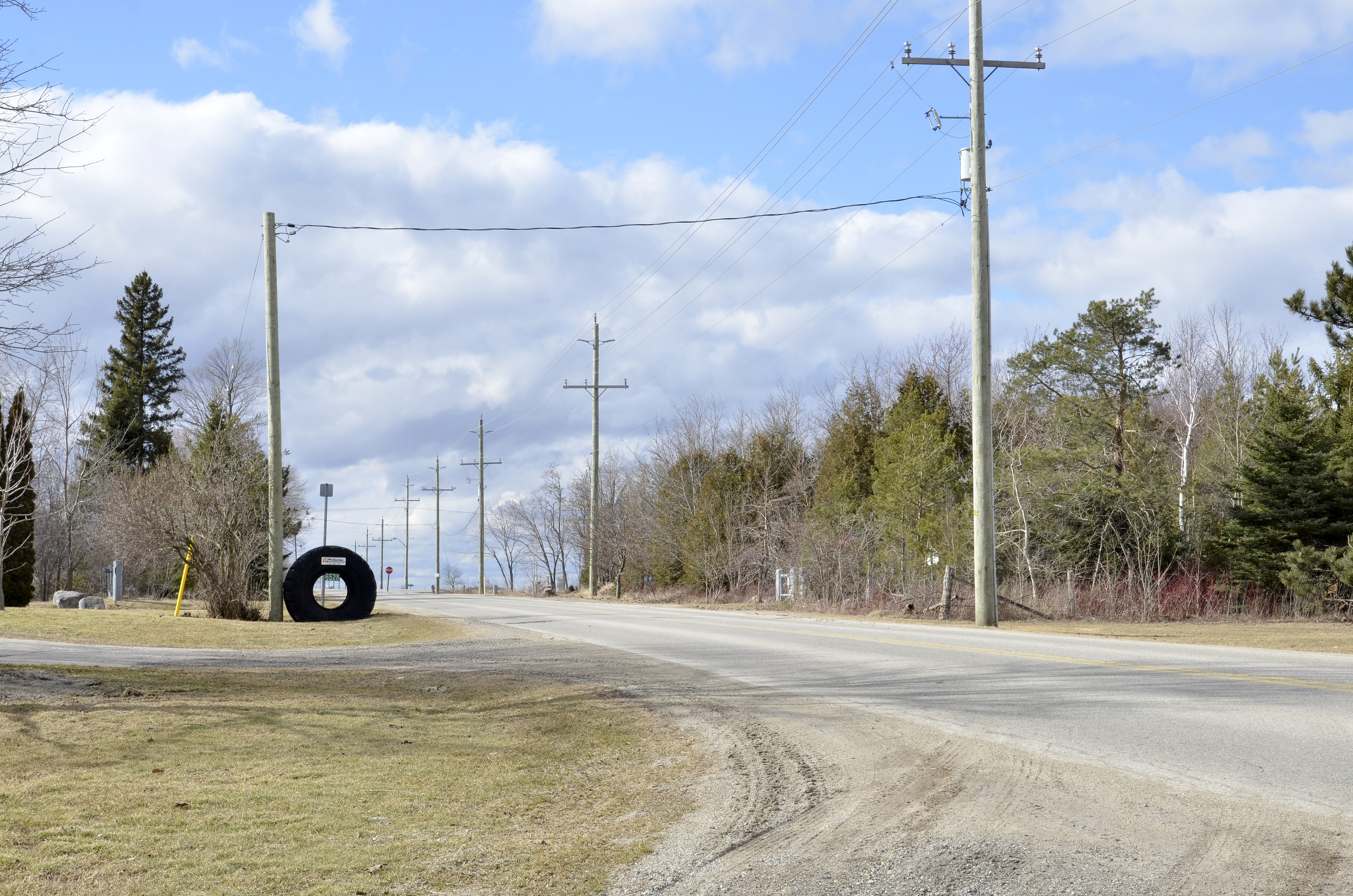
- Second Line in Spier

- Location within Canada Location within Ontario
- Coordinates: 43°44′19″N 80°21′48″W
- Country: Canada
- Province: Ontario
- County: Wellington
- Township: Centre Wellington
- Time zone: UTC-5 (Eastern (EST))
  - Summer (DST): UTC-4 (EDT)
- GNBC Code: FCRCY

Spier (also Spires) is an unincorporated rural community in Centre Wellington Township, Wellington County, Ontario, Canada. The settlement was part of West Garafraxa Township until 1999.

== History ==
Forbes Moir emigrated from Aberdeenshire, Scotland in 1858, and purchased 250 acres (100 ha) in the area. Moir went on to serve as councillor, deputy reeve, reeve, auditor, and school trustee in West Garafraxa Township.

When the Credit Valley Railway was constructed in 1879, a portion ran through Forbes Moir's property, and Spires became a flag stop located there. The line was later owned by the Ontario and Quebec Railway, and then Canadian Pacific Railway. The line was abandoned in 1988, and has been converted into the Elora Cataract Trailway, a 47 km (29 mi) recreational rail trail.

Spires post office was located at the settlement from 1882 to 1913, where Forbes Moir served as postmaster for over 20 years.
