= Lists of members of the Parliament of Canada who died in office =

There are several lists of members of the Parliament of Canada who died in office. These include:

- List of members of the Parliament of Canada who died in office (1867–1899)
- List of members of the Parliament of Canada who died in office (1900–1949)
- List of members of the Parliament of Canada who died in office (1950–1999)
- List of members of the Parliament of Canada who died in office (2000–present)
