= Creek Bank, Ontario =

Creek Bank
- Unincorporated rural community
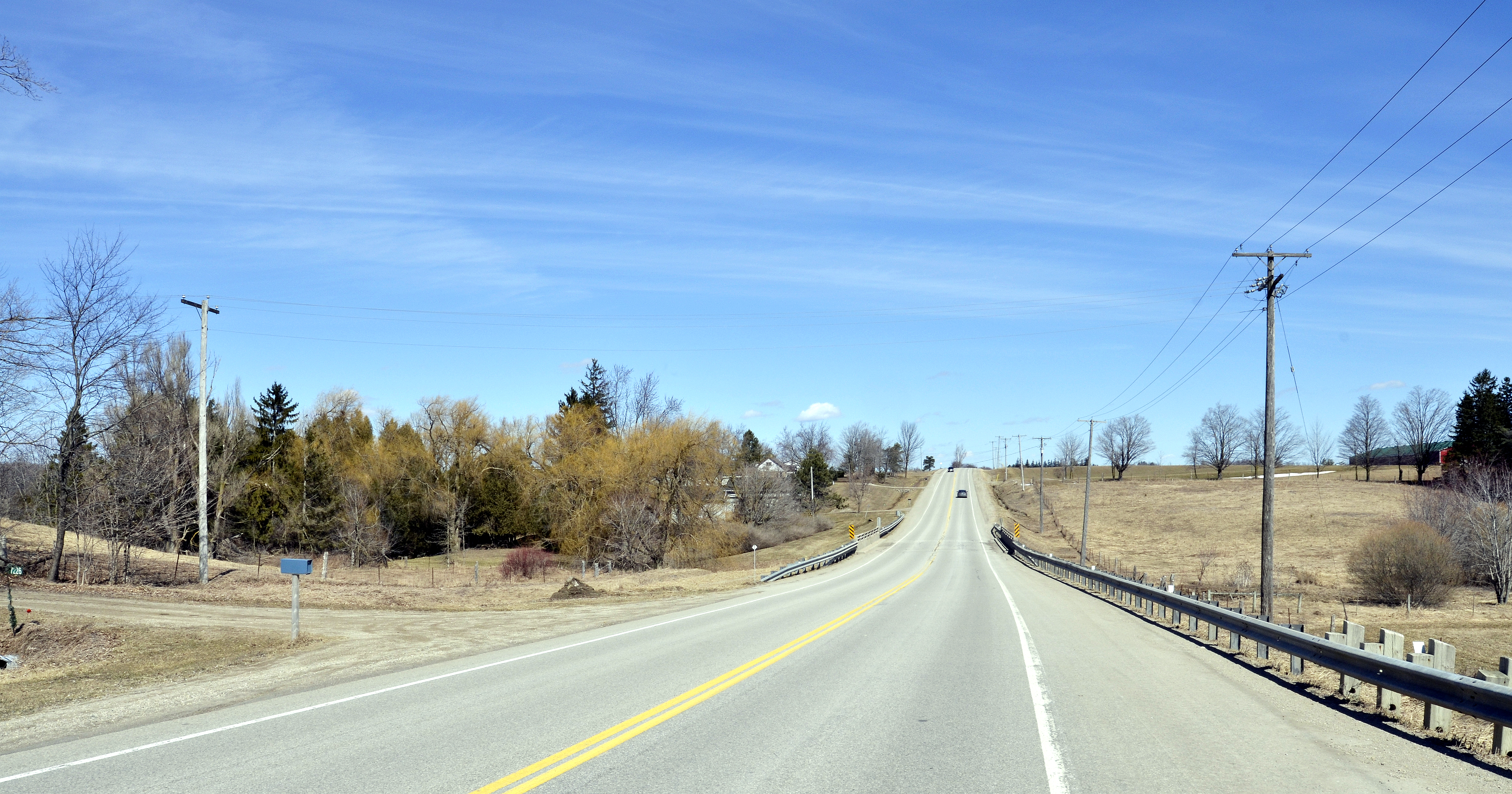
- Looking northeast on County Road 17 in Creek Bank

- Location of Creek Bank in Canada Creek Bank (Ontario)
- Coordinates: 43°42′18″N 80°32′09″W
- Country: Canada
- Province: Ontario
- County: Wellington
- Township: Centre Wellington
- Time zone: UTC-5 (Eastern (EST))
  - Summer (DST): UTC-4 (EDT)
- Postal code: N0B1S0
- Area code: 519
- GNBC Code: FAUCX

Creek Bank is an unincorporated rural community in Centre Wellington Township, Wellington County, Ontario, Canada.

The settlement is located on Carroll Creek.

== History ==
The Fisher brothers, Alexander, John, and Michael, were pioneer settlers who arrived in the area in 1841.

A post office was established in 1852, and mail was delivered daily to Creek Bank. The post office closed in 1915.

The Wesleyan Methodist Church was established in Creek Bank by the 1860s, located on a portion of the Fisher farm. The church was rebuilt in 1882 and renamed Bloomsbury Methodist Church. It operated until 1915, when it was dismantled and moved to Hollen, a town on the Conestogo River, 12 km (7.5 mi) west of Creek Bank. An extant cemetery located near the former church has graves dating to the 1850s. The gravestones were assembled into a cairn in 1837, and a historical marker is located there.

Creek Bank had a population of about 75 in 1867, and a blacksmith shop, hotel, and general store were located there. A stage coach passed twice daily between Elora and Hollen.

A school, Roman Catholic Separate School #6, was located at Creek Bank around 1870.
