= CICW-FM =

Radio station in Fergus, Ontario

Coordinates: 43.70473°N 80.3785°W

- Fergus, Ontario; Canada
- Broadcast area: Centre Wellington
- Frequency: 101.1 MHz (HD Radio)
- Branding: The Grand @ 101

Programming
- Format: Hot Adult Contemporary
- Subchannels: HD2: Country "Grand Country"

Ownership
- Owner: Centre Wellington Community Radio, Inc.

History
- First air date: 2011
- Former frequencies: 92.9 MHz (2011–2016)
- Call sign meaning: Centre Wellington (broadcast area)

Technical information
- Class: A
- ERP: 675 watts (2,250 watts maximum)
- HAAT: 49 metres (161 ft)

Links
- Website: thegrand101.com

CICW-FM (101.1 MHz) is a commercial radio station in Fergus, Ontario, serving Centre Wellington. It airs a hot adult contemporary format branded as The Grand @ 101. The station also broadcasts local news and weather reports. It is owned by Centre Wellington Community Radio, Inc. The studios and offices are on Garafraxa Street East.

CICW-FM is a Class A FM station with an effective radiated power (ERP) of 675 watts (2,250 watts maximum). The transmitter is on Gartshore Street near Gordon Street in Fergus.

== History ==
Centre Wellington Community Radio Inc. was founded in 2009 by Scott Jensen, Vic Folliott and Bill Valedis.

On April 29, 2011, Centre Wellington Community Radio Inc. received Canadian Radio-television and Telecommunications Commission (CRTC) approval to operate a community FM radio station at 92.9 MHz in Centre Wellington, Ontario. On September 12, 2011, Central Wellington Community Radio applied for a technical amendment - contours. On October 28, 2011, the CRTC approved Centre Wellington Community Radio Inc.'s application to decrease the average effective radiated power from 85 to 46 watts, decrease the maximum ERP from 200 to 150 watts, decrease the antenna's effective height above average terrain from 54.2 to 49.1 metres and relocate the antenna and transmitter site.

On September 25, 2014, the station applied to change CICW-FM's frequency from 92.9 MHz to 101.1 MHz and increase the average effective radiated power (ERP) from 45 to 750 watts (maximum ERP from 150 to 2,500 watts). The CRTC approved CWCR's application on September 10, 2015.

According to their Facebook page, the station moved to 101.1 MHz in late 2015. On March 28, 2016 at 6:00 AM, CICW became Grand 101 when the switch in frequency officially took place. The call letters remain CICW-FM.
