= Adam Johnston Fergusson Blair =

Canadian politician

The Honourable Adam Johnston Fergusson Blair PC
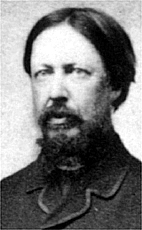

1st President of the Privy Council
- In office 1 July 1867 – 30 December 1867
- Monarch: Victoria
- Prime Minister: John A. Macdonald
- Preceded by: Position established
- Succeeded by: John A. Macdonald

Canadian Senator from Ontario
- In office 1867–1867

President of the Legislative Council of the Province of Canada
- In office 1866–1867

Member of the Legislative Council of the Province of Canada
- In office 1860–1867
- Constituency: Brock
- In office 1854–1857
- Constituency: Wellington
- In office 1847–1854
- Constituency: Waterloo

Judge in the Court for Wellington District
- In office 1842–1847

Personal details
- Born: Adam Johnston Fergusson; November 4, 1815 Perthshire, Scotland
- Died: December 30, 1867 (aged 52) Ottawa, Ontario, Canada
- Party: Reform Party; Liberal Party
- Occupation: Lawyer; judge; politician

Adam Johnston Fergusson Blair, PC (4 November 1815 – 30 December 1867), known prior to 1862 as Adam Johnston Fergusson, was a Scottish-born Canadian lawyer, judge and politician.

== Life and career ==
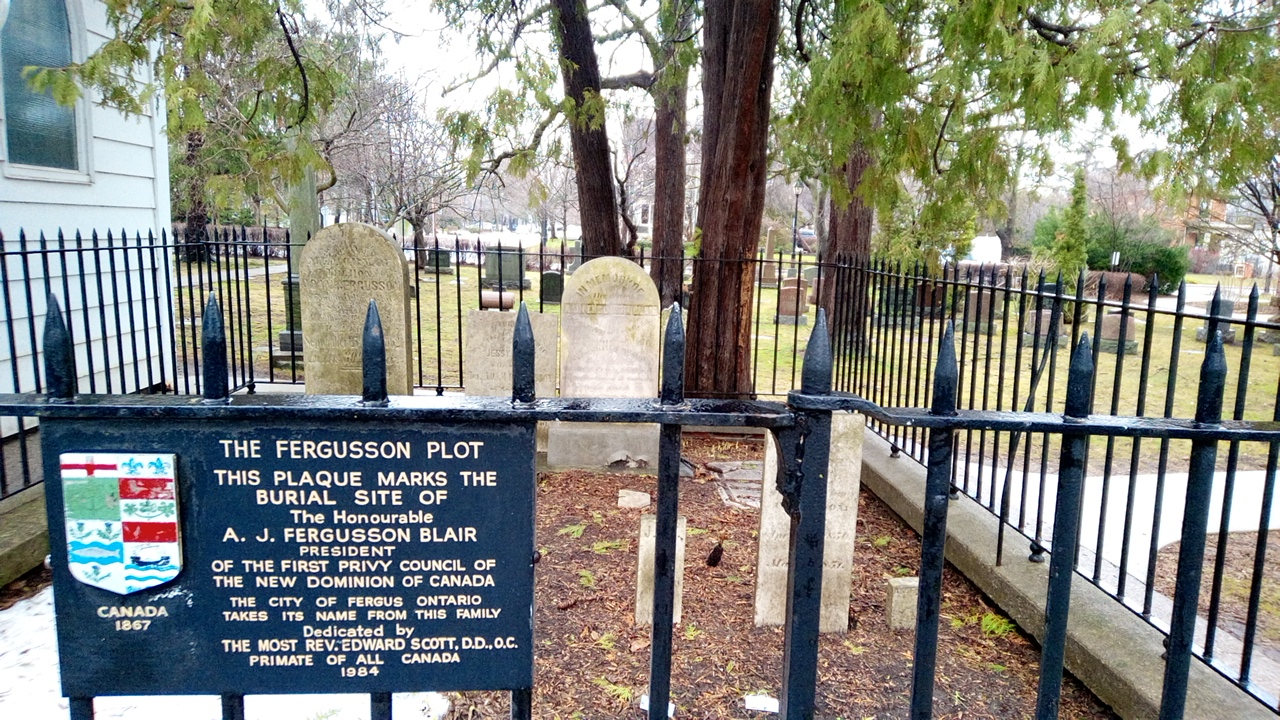
Fergusson's burial site in Burlington, Ontario.

Born in Perthshire, Scotland, the son of Adam Fergusson and his first wife Jemima Johnston Blair, he emigrated to Upper Canada with his family in 1833. He was called to the bar of Upper Canada in 1839 and set up practice in Guelph. He was named a judge in the court for Wellington District in 1842.

He resigned from the bench to run as a Reform Party candidate in the general election of 1847. He was elected to the Legislative Assembly of the Province of Canada for the riding of Waterloo and reelected in 1851. He represented the South riding of Wellington from 1854 to 1857. In 1860, he was elected to the Legislative Council for Brock division. He served as receiver general from March to May 1863, when he was named provincial secretary. He supported the Quebec resolutions in the legislative council and, in 1866, was named president of the executive council after the resignation of George Brown.

Following Canadian Confederation, he was appointed to the Senate of Canada on 23 October 1867 by a royal proclamation of Queen Victoria. Sitting as a Liberal, he represented the senatorial division of Ontario until his death, only two months and six days after his appointment.

He added Blair to his surname in 1862 in order to inherit the Blair estate in Scotland after the death of his older brother Neil James Fergusson Blair.

Fergusson is buried by the Anglican Parish Church of St Luke (founded 1834), the oldest church in Burlington, Ontario.

== See also ==
- List of members of the Canadian Parliament who died in office
