= Fergus Scottish Festival and Highland Games =

Cultural festival in Fergus, Canada

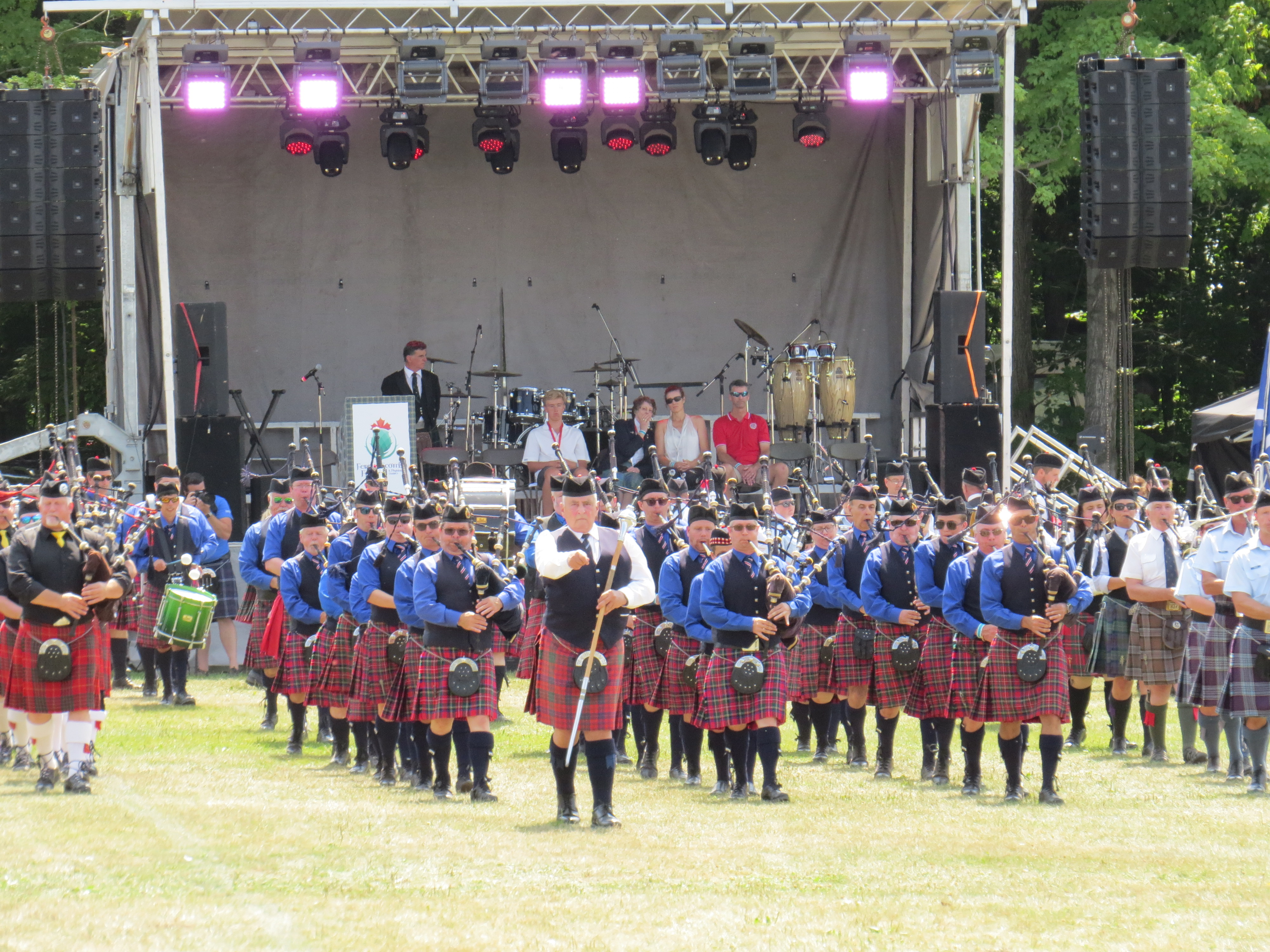
- Pipe bands marching at the Fergus Scottish Festival and Highland Games, 2018
- Status: Active
- Genre: Festival
- Frequency: Annually, second weekend in August
- Venue: Centre Wellington Community Sportsplex
- Locations: Fergus, Ontario, Canada
- Years active: 80
- Founded: 1946
- Founder: Alex Robertson
- Website: fergusscottishfestival.com

The Fergus Scottish Festival and Highland Games is a three-day cultural festival that has been held in the town of Fergus, Ontario, for more than 80 years. The festival includes events leading to the World's Scottish Athletic Championship.

== History ==
The festival was first held in 1946 as a one day event in Victoria Park in downtown Fergus, organized by Alex Robertson. The festival later expanded to two then three days; it outgrew the park and was moved to the grounds of the Centre Wellington Township Sportsplex at the edge of town, providing space for overnight camping.

The name was changed to Fergus Scottish Festival in 1992.

By 1997 the festival was attracting 35,000 people on the Saturday of its event.

In 2007 the festival received a government grant to fund a tribute concert to John Allan Cameron.

In 2012 a combination of poor weather and unexpected taxes left the festival in debt. That year the festival's budget was about $500,000. The federal government rescinded the festival's amateur sport classification, and required it to remit $78,000 in HST from ticket sales. A $50,000 loan from Centre Wellington township kept the organization afloat, and was paid back with the profits from later years.

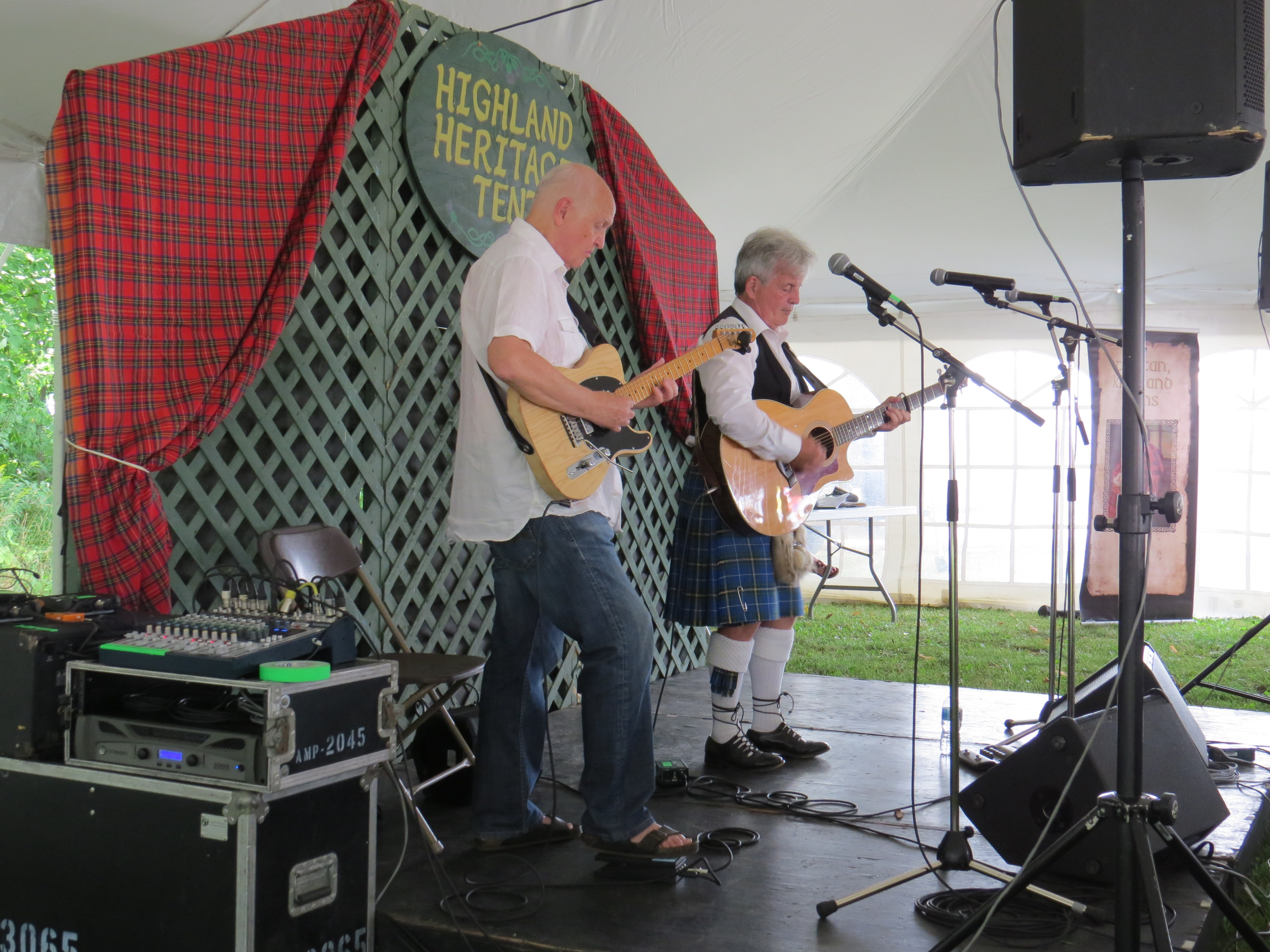
Bill Bridges and Tommy Leadbeater perform in the Heritage tent, 2018

In 2015 the festival was in the news when it hosted a mass caber-tossing event; 69 cabers were turned simultaneously, and this overturned the previous Guinness World Record of 66.

In 2018 the festival hosted the Women’s Heavy Events Championship.

In 2025, The Lord Lyon, King of Arms Opened the games.

== Attractions ==
The festival opens with a traditional tattoo, including singing, dancing and piping, and a fireworks display.

=== Pipe bands ===
The festival hosts a series of pipe and drum competitions. Bands from around Ontario, as well as from other provinces and the United States, come to compete. The bands also participate in mass piping events for the entertainment of the festival attendees.

=== Highland games ===
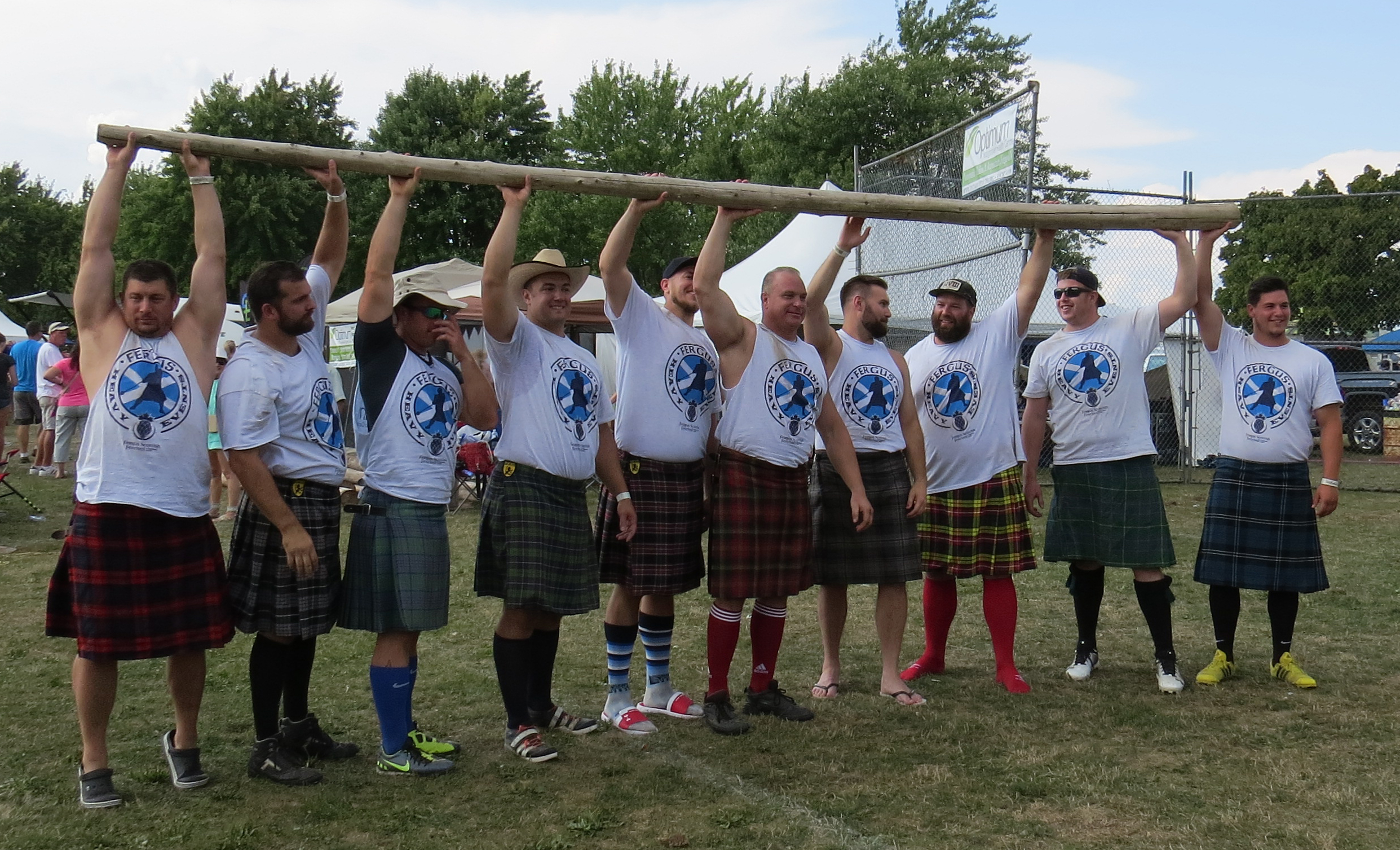
Heavy event competitors, 2018

In the tradition of the Highland games, the festival hosts a series of Scottish strength competitions, including hammer throwing, tug-of-war, and caber tossing. There is also a 10k running event.

=== Highland dancing ===
Highland dancers participate in various classes of competitions, and provide entertainment throughout the weekend.

=== Scottish cultural events and displays ===
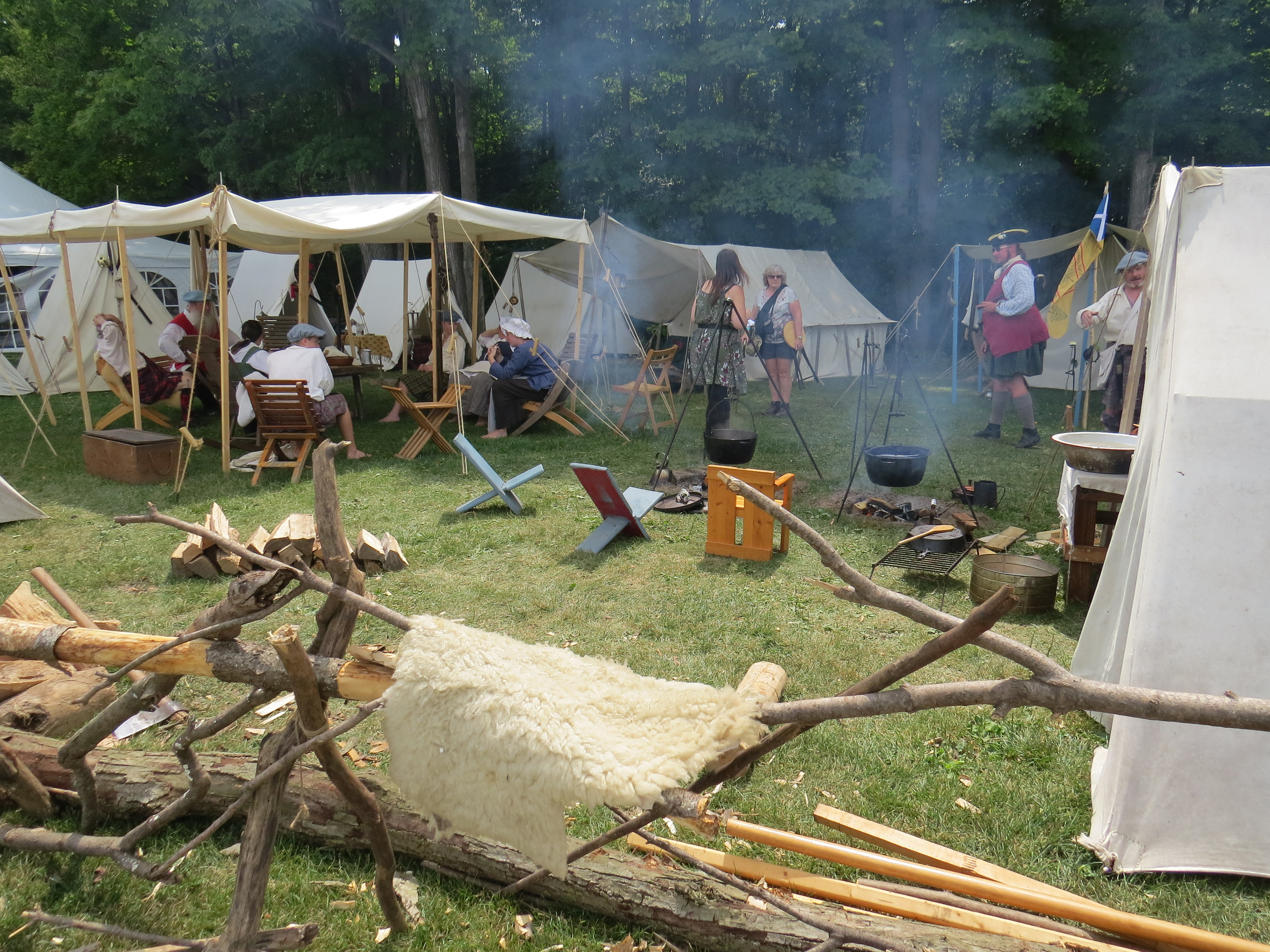
Jacobite encampment re-enactment, August 2018

Each year members of about 50 Scottish clans set up tents to display the history of their families. Traditional Scottish food and music are also available for the attendees, as well as whisky tasting, quilting, horse shoeing, weaving and genealogical displays. Storytellers and historical re-enactments provide additional entertainment. There are also activities for children, including sword fighting and archery.

=== Concert ===
An evening concert on Saturday features a variety of musical entertainment.

=== Marketplace ===
The festival hosts a venue for the sale of food, crafts and souvenirs.
