= Adam Fergusson (Upper Canada politician) =

Upper Canada politician

Adam Fergusson (March 4, 1783 – September 25, 1862) was a farmer and political figure in Upper Canada and Canada West.

He was born in 1783 at Woodhill, Perthshire, Scotland, studied law and became a magistrate. He was a director of an agricultural society, the Highland Society of Scotland, and was sent by them in 1831 to determine the state of agriculture in Canada and the United States. Impressed by his visit, he settled with his family on a farm, which he also named Woodhill, near Waterdown in East Flamborough Township, Upper Canada in 1833. In 1834, he established the village of Fergus with James Webster. He commanded a militia unit during the Upper Canada Rebellion of 1837. In 1839, he was appointed to the Legislative Council of Upper Canada and was a member of the Legislative Council for United Canada until his death in 1862. Although loyal to Britain, prosperous and well-connected, he supported the Reformers.

He remained interested in improving agriculture in Upper Canada. He imported cattle from Britain and established a competition, the Fergus Cup, for the best Durham heifer. He was the first president of the Agricultural Association of Upper Canada in 1846 and a member of the Board of Agriculture of Upper Canada. He was a senator at the University of Toronto and played an important role in establishing the Upper Canada Veterinary School which became the Ontario Veterinary College, now part of the University of Guelph.

He suffered a stroke in 1860 which left him paralyzed and died at Waterdown in 1862.

His son Adam Johnston Fergusson Blair served in the legislative assembly for the Province of Canada and was later named to the Senate.
