= List of members of the Parliament of Canada who died in office (2000–present) =

The following is a list of members of the Canadian Parliament who died while they were serving their terms after 2000.

== Senate ==
| Member | Party | Province/Division | Date of death | Age at death (years) | Cause |
|---|---|---|---|---|---|
| Gildas Molgat | Liberal | Manitoba (Sainte-Rose) | February 28, 2001 | 74 | Stroke |
| Jean-Maurice Simard | Progressive Conservative | New Brunswick (Edmundston) | June 16, 2001 | 69 | |
| Ron Duhamel | Liberal | Manitoba (Manitoba) | September 30, 2002 | 64 | Cancer |
| C. William Doody | Progressive Conservative | Newfoundland and Labrador (Harbour Bell-Main Island) | December 27, 2005 | 74 | |
| Shirley Maheu | Liberal | Quebec (Rougemont) | February 1, 2006 | 74 | |
| Michael Forrestall | Conservative | Nova Scotia (Dartmouth-Eastern Shore) | June 8, 2006 | 73 | |
| Fred Dickson | Conservative | Nova Scotia (Nova Scotia) | February 9, 2012 | 74 | Colon cancer |
| Doug Finley | Conservative | Ontario (Ontario-South Coast) | May 11, 2013 | 66 | Cancer |
| Pierre Claude Nolin | Conservative | Quebec (De Salaberry) | April 23, 2015 | 64 | Cancer |
| Tobias Enverga | Conservative | Ontario (Ontario) | November 16, 2017 | 61 | |
| Elaine McCoy | Canadian Senators Group | Alberta (Alberta) | December 29, 2020 | 74 | |
| Judith Keating | Independent Senators Group | New Brunswick (New Brunswick) | July 15, 2021 | 64 | |
| Josée Forest-Niesing | Independent Senators Group | Ontario (Ontario) | November 20, 2021 | 59 | COVID-19 |
| Ian Shugart | Independent | Ontario (Ontario) | October 25, 2023 | 66 | Cancer |
| Todd Lewis | Canadian Senators Group | Saskatchewan (Saskatchewan) | July 31, 2026 | 65 | |

== House of Commons ==
| Member | Party | Province/Riding | Date of death | Age at death (years) | Cause |
|---|---|---|---|---|---|
| Lawrence D. O'Brien | Liberal | Newfoundland and Labrador (Labrador) | December 16, 2004 | 53 | Cancer |
| Chuck Cadman | Independent | British Columbia (Surrey North) | July 9, 2005 | 57 | Malignant melanoma |
| Benoît Sauvageau | Bloc Québécois | Quebec (Terrebonne) | August 28, 2006 | 42 | Car accident |
| Jack Layton | New Democratic Party | Ontario (Toronto—Danforth) | August 22, 2011 | 61 | Cancer |
| Jim Flaherty | Conservative | Ontario (Whitby—Oshawa) | April 10, 2014 | 64 | Heart attack |
| Jim Hillyer | Conservative | Alberta (Medicine Hat—Cardston—Warner) | March 23, 2016 | 41 | Heart failure caused by acute myeloid leukemia |
| Mauril Bélanger | Liberal | Ontario (Ottawa—Vanier) | August 15, 2016 | 61 | Amyotrophic lateral sclerosis |
| Arnold Chan | Liberal | Ontario (Scarborough—Agincourt) | September 14, 2017 | 50 | Nasopharyngeal cancer |
| Gord Brown | Conservative | Ontario (Leeds—Grenville—Thousand Islands and Rideau Lakes) | May 2, 2018 | 57 | Heart attack |
| Mark Warawa | Conservative | British Columbia (Langley—Aldergrove) | June 20, 2019 | 69 | Pancreatic cancer |
| Deepak Obhrai | Conservative | Alberta (Calgary Forest Lawn) | August 2, 2019 | 69 | Liver cancer |
| Jim Carr | Liberal | Manitoba (Winnipeg South Centre) | December 12, 2022 | 71 | Multiple myeloma |

== See also ==
- List of members of the Canadian Parliament who died in office (1867–1899)
- List of members of the Canadian Parliament who died in office (1900–1949)
- List of members of the Canadian Parliament who died in office (1950–1999)
