= Fergus, Ontario =

Fergus
- Unincorporated community
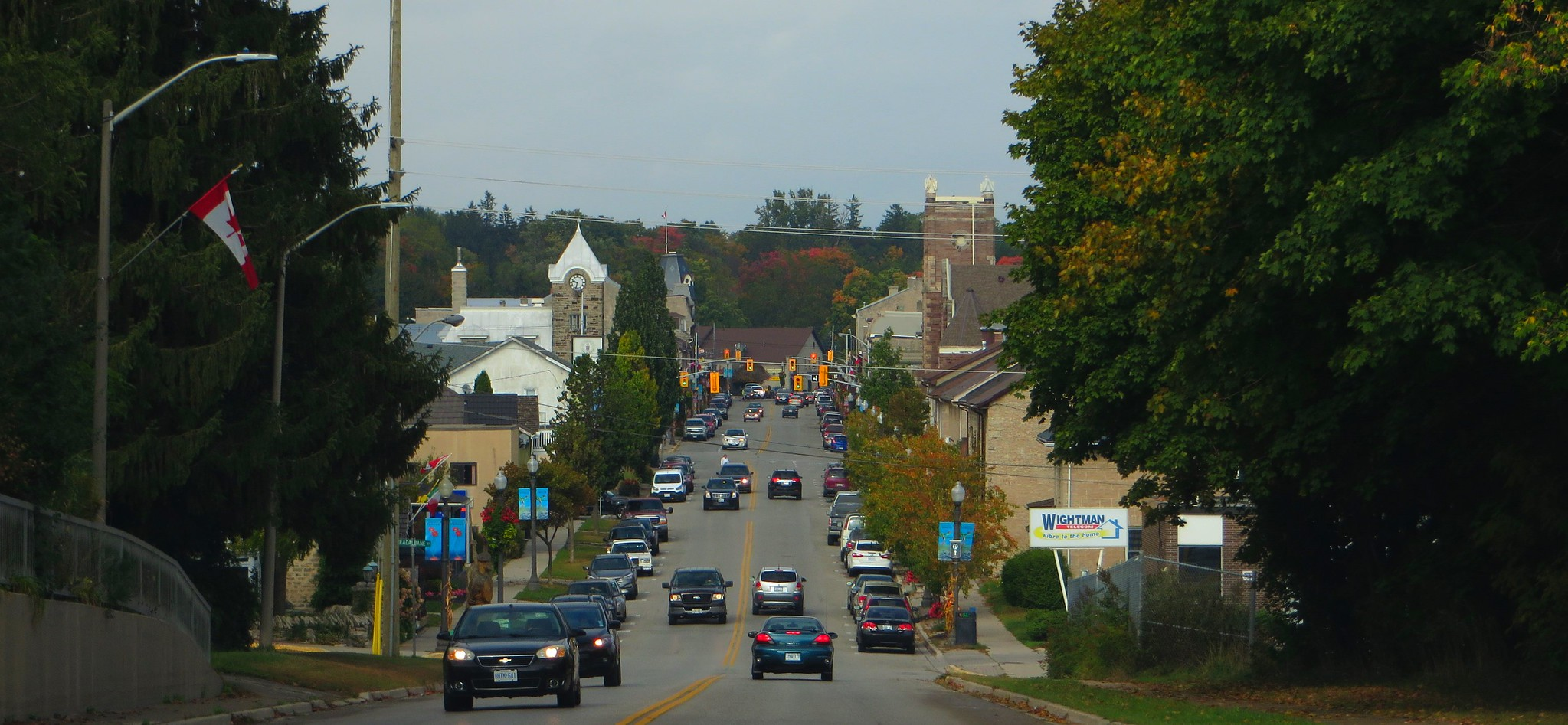
- View of Downtown Fergus
- Interactive map of Fergus
- Coordinates: 43°42′11″N 80°22′47″W
- Country: Canada
- Province: Ontario
- County: Wellington County
- Township: Centre Wellington

Government
  - Township mayor: Shawn Watters

Area
  - Land: 15.08 km^{2} (5.82 sq mi)
- Elevation: 398.0 m (1,305.8 ft)

Population (2021)
  - Total: 23,210
  - Density: 1,267.6/km^{2} (3,283/sq mi)
- Time zone: UTC-5 (EST)
  - Summer (DST): UTC-4 (EDT)
- Forward sortation area: N1M
- Area codes: 519, 226 and 548
- NTS Map: 40P9 Guelph
- GNBC Code: FBDWO

Fergus is the largest community in Centre Wellington, a township within Wellington County in Ontario, Canada. It lies on the Grand River about 18 km NNW of Guelph. The population of this community at the time of the 2016 Census was 20,767, but the community is growing as new homes are being built for sale.

Fergus was an independent town until 1999 when the Township was formed by amalgamating the Town of Fergus, the Village of Elora, and the Townships of Nichol, Pilkington, West Garafraxa, and part of Eramosa.

== History ==
The first settlers to this area were freed slaves, who formed what was known as the Pierpoint Settlement, named after their leader, Richard Pierpoint, a United Empire Loyalist originally from Bondou, Senegal in Africa. Along with a half dozen other men who had also fought with the British during the American Revolutionary War, Pierpoint was granted land in Garafraxa Township somewhere around what is now Scotland Street in Fergus.

Another settlement was founded nearby in 1833 and was first called Little Falls because of the scenic (water) falls, now between the Public Library and the Fergus Market. The primary developers were Adam Fergusson and James Webster, who had purchased 28 km² (7,000 acres) of land. Both were later lawyers by profession. The first bridge over the river in the heart of the settlement was built in 1834 by Fergusson.

The first house was built in 1833, a hotel was built in 1844 and in 1835, a sawmill, grist-mill, church and school were opened. The post office was established in 1836. Fergusson was also a founder of the first curling club in Ontario; it was opened in 1834, and is still active today. After 1838, Scottish settlers purchased the land in what was previously Pierpoint Settlement.

James Webster was the one who opened the Fergus Mills and cleared a great deal of land for farming. Alexander Dingwall Fordyce joined Ferguson and they controlled all of the industry in Fergus until 1855. Until approximately 1850, an unwritten policy of restricted growth was implemented. Because Fergusson, Webster and some other Scottish emigrants owned the land, only Scots could purchase village lots. However, in order to accommodate Irish settlers, Webster founded the town of Arthur (just north of Fergus) in 1840. By 1846 the settlement had 21 businesses. The population was 184 mostly of Scots.The community had a church and a post office and several tradesmen.

James Wilson arrived in 1855 and opened an oatmeal mill, then a flour mill, then a saw mill and then a woolen mill and a factory, Monkland Mills, that supplied oatmeal for export. They and other Scots living in the settlement established a booming economy using the waterfalls on the Grand River to power local industry. They built solid stone houses, factories and other buildings which still characterize Fergus. Many of the buildings from the 1800s are still in use today. In addition to Scots, the other settlers in this area were Irish or freed slaves from the U.S.

In 1858, the settlement, with a population of 1,000, was incorporated as a village called Fergus in honour one of its founders, Adam Fergusson. By 1869 the population was 1,500.

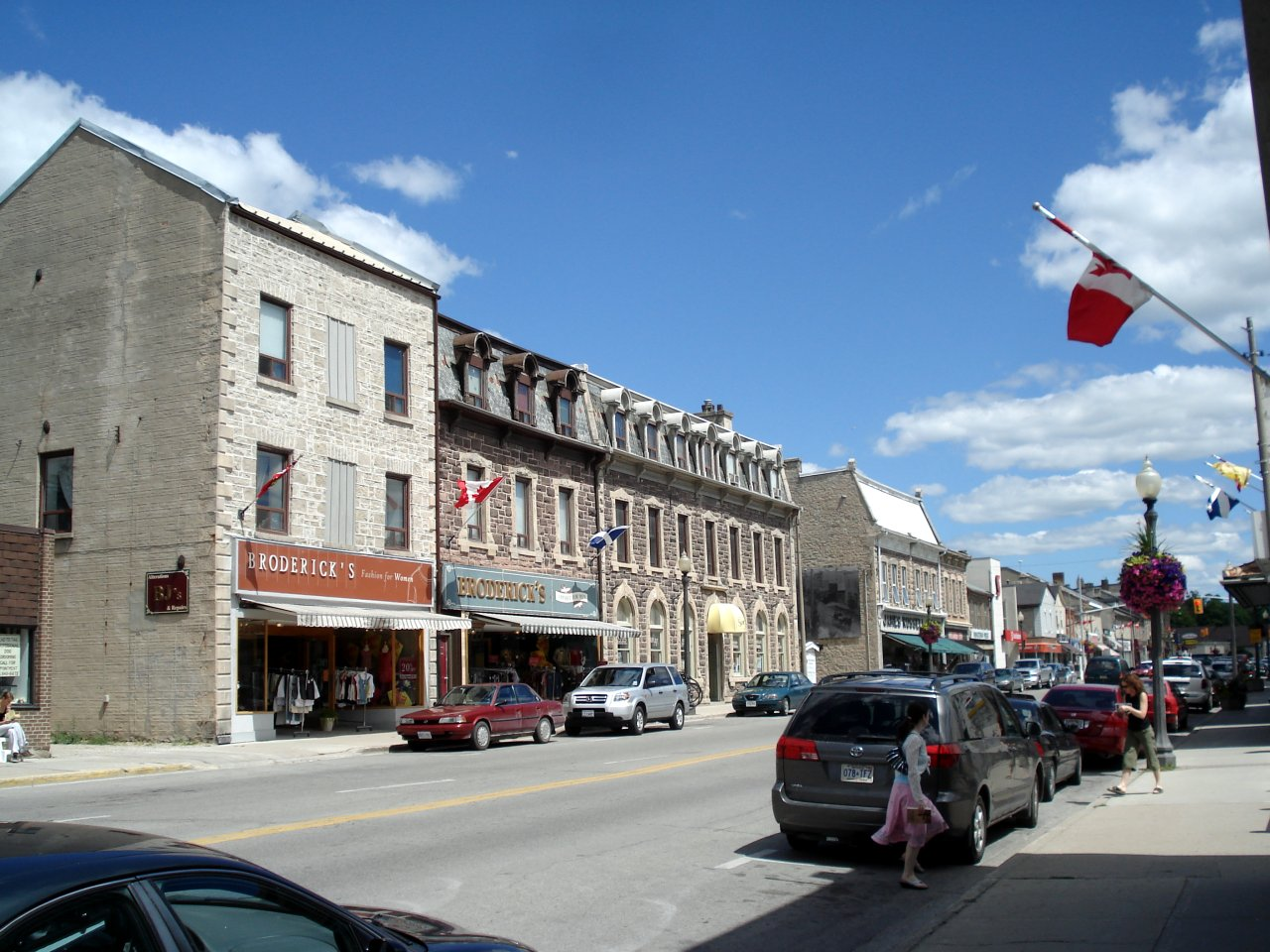
St Andrew Street West

On November 29, 1890, electricity became available in the village through the efforts of Dr. Abraham Groves. More extensive provision of power, by Ontario Hydro, began in 1914.

Fergus was a centre for agricultural equipment manufacturing under Beatty Brothers Limited, which was founded by George and Matthew Beatty in 1874. Originally from Albion Township, the brothers acquired an earlier equipment manufacturer in the area, Grindley, and began producing their own lines of farm equipment. The company spearheaded the transition from small-scale local artisan manufacturing of farm equipment of the mid- to late-19th century to standardized product lines, large factory floors, and national distribution of products that characterized the era of Fordism. By the turn of the century, the company's operations, centred around the Foundry building (most recently in use as the Fergus Marketplace), dominated downtown Fergus. Around this time the company began to transition to appliance manufacturing and away from its roots in farm equipment, taking advantage of the growing suburban consumer market of the mid-20th century. With heavy competition from American manufacturers like Westinghouse, however, the company was ultimately taken over in successive mergers starting in the 1960s, which culminated in the final closure of the last remaining ex-Beatty plant in Fergus in 2013.

The first library, built with a Carnegie grant, opened in 1911 and is in the register of Canada's Historic Places. In 1953, the village was incorporated as the "Town of Fergus" and in 1999 became a part of the Township of Centre Wellington.

=== From "poorhouse" to museum ===
In 1877, the County opened the Wellington County House of Industry and Refuge, or Poorhouse as it was called, on Wellington Road 18 between Fergus and Elora. Over the years, approximately 1500 "deserving" poor, including those who were destitute, old and infirm or suffering from disabilities were housed here. The sixty bed house for "inmates" was surrounded by a 30-acre "industrial" farm with a barn for livestock that produced some of the food for the 70 residents and the staff and also provided work for them. Others worked in the House itself. According to a 2009 report by the Toronto Star, "pauperism was considered a moral failing that could be erased through order and hard work". A hospital was added in 1892. A nearby cemetery has 271 plots for those who died. In 1947 the House was converted into the Wellington County Home for the Aged and in 1975 the building reopened as the Wellington County Museum and Archives.

A historic plaque was erected at the museum, indicating that the "government-supported poorhouse" was "the shelter of last resort for the homeless and destitute, who traded spartan accommodations for domestic or agricultural labour".

== Geography ==
Fergus is located north-northwest of Guelph and sits on the Grand River. It is near many natural settings such as the Elora Gorge and Conservation Area, and Belwood Lake. Fergus is a mostly residential community filled with streets lined with trees, many stone buildings, schools, and attractive parklands. It is laid out on a rectangular grid, with the Grand River flowing through the downtown heritage centre, its limestone riverbanks surrounding it.

=== Climate ===
Fergus has a humid continental climate (Dfb) under the Köppen climate classification with cold winters and warm summers.

Climate data for Fergus (1981−2010)
Month	Jan	Feb	Mar	Apr	May	Jun	Jul	Aug	Sep	Oct	Nov	Dec	Year
Record high °C (°F)	15.6 (60.1)	12.0 (53.6)	23.9 (75.0)	29.0 (84.2)	32.0 (89.6)	34.0 (93.2)	35.5 (95.9)	35.0 (95.0)	35.0 (95.0)	28.9 (84.0)	24.4 (75.9)	17.5 (63.5)	35.5 (95.9)
Mean daily maximum °C (°F)	−3.6 (25.5)	−2.1 (28.2)	2.6 (36.7)	10.4 (50.7)	17.5 (63.5)	22.8 (73.0)	25.2 (77.4)	24.2 (75.6)	19.8 (67.6)	12.7 (54.9)	5.4 (41.7)	−0.7 (30.7)	11.2 (52.2)
Daily mean °C (°F)	−7.4 (18.7)	−6.3 (20.7)	−1.9 (28.6)	5.7 (42.3)	12.2 (54.0)	17.5 (63.5)	20.0 (68.0)	19.0 (66.2)	14.9 (58.8)	8.3 (46.9)	2.1 (35.8)	−3.9 (25.0)	6.7 (44.1)
Mean daily minimum °C (°F)	−11.1 (12.0)	−10.5 (13.1)	−6.5 (20.3)	0.9 (33.6)	6.9 (44.4)	12.2 (54.0)	14.7 (58.5)	13.8 (56.8)	9.9 (49.8)	3.9 (39.0)	−1.2 (29.8)	−7.1 (19.2)	2.2 (36.0)
Record low °C (°F)	−35 (−31)	−32.8 (−27.0)	−31.7 (−25.1)	−18.9 (−2.0)	−6.1 (21.0)	−0.6 (30.9)	2.2 (36.0)	−0.6 (30.9)	−5 (23)	−11.7 (10.9)	−18.3 (−0.9)	−34.4 (−29.9)	−35 (−31)
Average precipitation mm (inches)	67.9 (2.67)	55.9 (2.20)	59.6 (2.35)	74.1 (2.92)	86.9 (3.42)	83.8 (3.30)	89.2 (3.51)	96.6 (3.80)	93.1 (3.67)	77.2 (3.04)	93.0 (3.66)	68.6 (2.70)	945.7 (37.23)
Average rainfall mm (inches)	27.8 (1.09)	25.3 (1.00)	36.7 (1.44)	67.9 (2.67)	86.8 (3.42)	83.8 (3.30)	89.2 (3.51)	96.6 (3.80)	93.1 (3.67)	75.6 (2.98)	80.5 (3.17)	34.7 (1.37)	797.8 (31.41)
Average snowfall cm (inches)	40.1 (15.8)	30.6 (12.0)	22.9 (9.0)	6.2 (2.4)	0.1 (0.0)	0.0 (0.0)	0.0 (0.0)	0.0 (0.0)	0.0 (0.0)	1.6 (0.6)	12.5 (4.9)	33.9 (13.3)	147.8 (58.2)
Average precipitation days (≥ 0.2 mm)	19.7	14.9	14.0	14.6	14.4	12.0	11.5	12.4	13.9	16.5	17.4	18.3	179.5
Average rainy days (≥ 0.2 mm)	4.7	4.5	7.4	12.9	14.3	12.0	11.5	12.4	13.9	16.3	13.1	6.8	129.7
Average snowy days (≥ 0.2 cm)	16.5	11.8	8.2	2.8	0.15	0.0	0.0	0.0	0.0	0.73	5.6	13.2	59.0
Source: Environment Canada

== Economy ==
Centre Wellington is heavily agricultural but is also the home to industries, manufacturers, retailers, health care services and trades people. The local economy also benefits greatly from tourism. Data is not available for Fergus alone but at the time of the 2011 Census, 6.4% of the workforce of Centre Wellington was involved in agriculture and other resource-based industries/utilities, 24.8% in manufacturing and construction, 19.8% in health and education and 13.2% in wholesale and retail trade. The top three categories for employment (in order of importance) were in manufacturing, Healthcare and Agriculture. The major employers in the township include Jefferson Elora Corp., Nexans Canada, Polycorp Ltd., Groves Memorial Hospital, Wellington Terrace and PR Donnelly. The average real estate value, for a single detached home in 2014 was $342,817 in Centre Wellington.

Some movie and TV shows have been filmed in this area. For example, parts of the Grand River in Elora and Fergus were the site for some of the scenes filmed for the 1994 movie Trapped in Paradise. as were some scenes for the 2011 TV movie Salem Falls. In 2010, parts of the movie If a Tree Falls were filmed here as were parts of the NBC mini series Heroes Reborn in 2015.

== Demographics ==
Fergus, Ontario Historical populations
Year	Pop.	±%
1841	184	—
1871	1,666	+805.4%
1901	1,396	−16.2%
1911	1,534	+9.9%
1921	1,796	+17.1%
1931	2,594	+44.4%
1941	2,832	+9.2%
1951	3,387	+19.6%
1961	3,831	+13.1%
1971	5,433	+41.8%
1981	6,064	+11.6%
1991	7,940	+30.9%
2001	10,017	+26.2%
2006	18,211	+81.8%
2011	19,126	+5.0%
2016	20,767	+8.6%
2021	23,209	+11.8%

The 2016 Census indicated a population of 20,767.

Population:	20,767 (12.8% from 1996)
Land area:	17.66 km²
Population density:	1,175.6 people/km²
Total private dwellings:	8249

== Sports and attractions ==
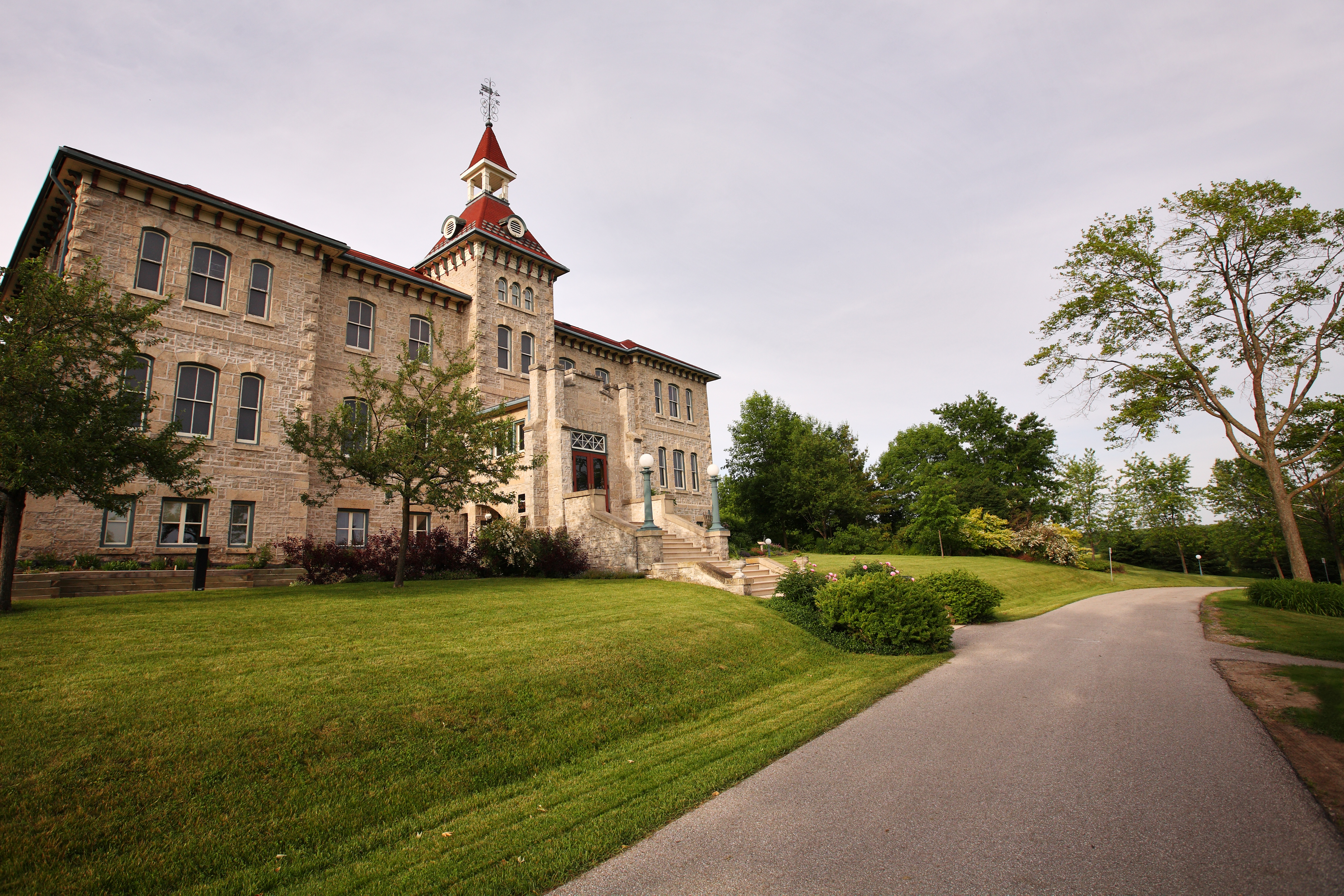
Wellington County Museum and Archives in Aboyne

Fergus is best known for the annual Scottish Festival and Highland Games, held in August. The games represent the largest gathering of clans in the world outside Scotland and Cape Breton Island. Competitions are held for music, dancing and 'heavy' events such as the caber toss. A 10 km (6.21 mi) run is also contested. The organizers summarize the event as follows: "Celtic Music, crafts for the kids, heavy events championships, bagpipes, drums, author appearances, bands, Highland dancing, story telling, singing, clan information and heritage, beer tents, artisans and vendors .... Pipe Band Competitions, Military Tattoo, Highland Dancers.

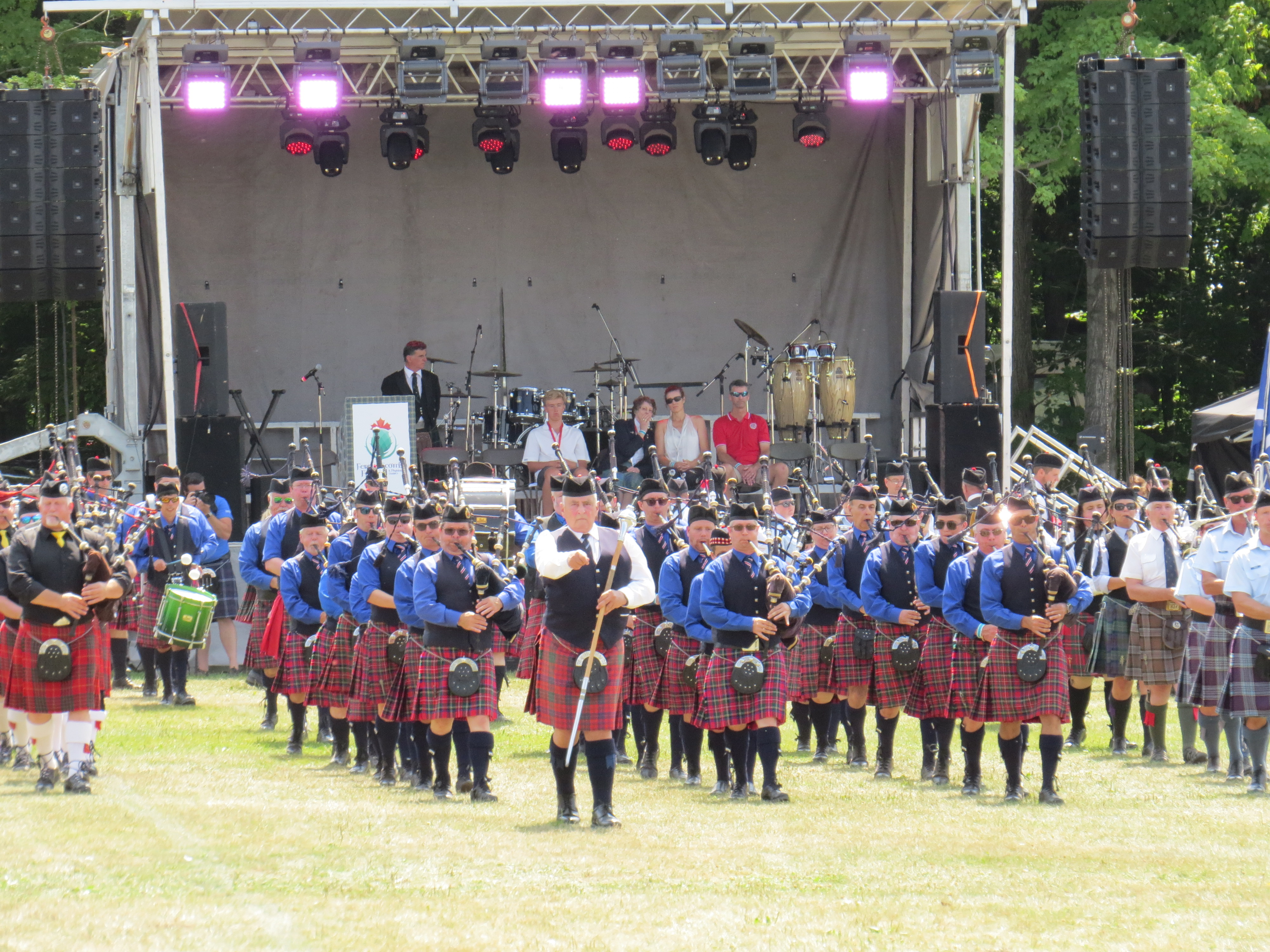
Pipe bands marching at the Fergus Scottish Festival and Highland Games, 2018

Fergus is also home to the Fergus Highland Rugby Football Club. The club plays in the Ontario Rugby Union, and has two Men's teams, two Women's teams and a strong and growing junior program. Fergus Curling Club, Ontario's oldest continuously running Curling Club, was founded in 1834 by settlers from Scotland. Adam Fergusson was the first president. Matches were held outdoors until 1879 when an indoor rink was opened.

St Andrew Street runs parallel to the Grand River (on its north side) and is the heart of downtown. In addition to stores and restaurants, the Fergus Grand Theatre is located here, on the south side of the street. Originally a cinema that opened in 1928, the venue now hosts live entertainment and stage plays. On the south side of the river is Queen Street where the Fergus Market on the River (no longer a farmers' market) houses shops located in restored historic warehouses.

The Wellington County Museum and Archives and the Wellington County library are in nearby Aboyne, halfway between Fergus and Elora. The museum is located in a two-storey Italianate-style stone building on a former working farm. The building is the oldest known state-supported poorhouse or almshouse in Canada. It was called the House of Industry and Refuge when it opened in 1877. Subsequently, the home switched to caring for the elderly and chronically ill, eventually closing in 1971. The building was designated a National Historic Site of Canada in 1995.

Nearby attractions include the Elora Gorge, Elora Quarry Conservation Area, the Elora Cataract Trailway for hiking, the County Museum and Elora Gorge Falls in addition to Grand River Raceway. Users of the TripAdvisor web site recommend the nearby Belwood Lake Conservation Area, the Fergus Grand Theatre for live performances, Grand River Troutfitters and the Wellington Artist's Gallery and Art Centre.

== Government ==
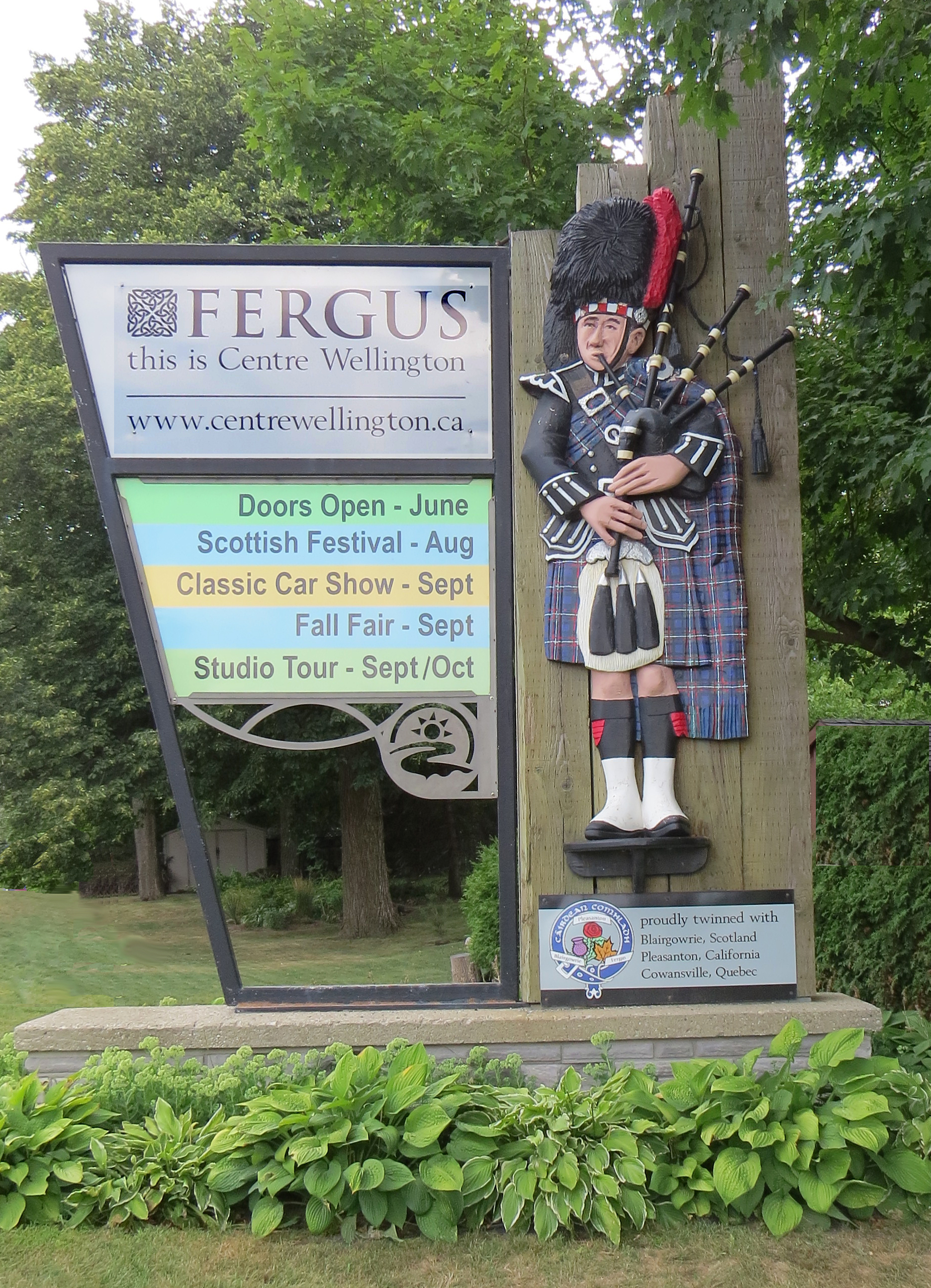
Fergus, Ontario sign

The Centre Wellington Township council includes a Mayor (Shawn Watters) and six councillors. Three of the latter live in Fergus while one lives in Elora.

The Township is also represented on the County of Wellington Council which is made up of seven mayors and nine councillors. The head of this council is the Warden (Dennis Lever).

== Infrastructure ==
=== Education ===
Fergus and Centre Wellington have two major school boards that operate inside the municipality at a public level. The Wellington Catholic District School Board administers Catholic education in Guelph and Wellington County, operating St. Joseph's Catholic Elementary School (JK-8). The Upper Grand District School Board administers to the area surrounding the upper Grand River operating in Fergus, J. D. Hogarth Public School (K-8), John Black Public School, James McQueen Public School (K-6), Victoria Terrace Public School (K-6).

==== High schools ====
- Centre Wellington District High School (C.W.D.H.S.) is located in the newer suburbs on the south-east edge of the town. It is home to the Falcons and has a student population of roughly 1500.
- Emmanuel Christian High School (E.C.H.S) is a private Canadian Reformed Christian school located on the south side of Fergus and has a student population of roughly 200.

=== Health Care ===
Fergus is home to Groves Memorial Community Hospital, which recently relocated to a new facility on Frederick Campbell St, near the Wellington County Museum. Dr. Abraham Groves (1847-1935) was a pioneer of many forms of healthcare in Fergus, and was recognized for his skill and ability as a surgeon. He opened his own hospital, the Royal Alexandria in 1902 and included a nursing school. Before Dr. Groves died in 1935, he gave the hospital to the community.

== Media ==
=== Online media ===
EloraFergusToday.com is an online local news source in Fergus offering the latest breaking news, weather updates, entertainment, sports and business features, obituaries and more.

=== Print media ===
The Fergus News-Record, later the News Express, published for more than 100 years until Torstar/Metroland closed it down in 2016. Fergus was also covered by the Guelph Mercury until it ceased its print edition in January 2016. The Wellington Advertiser still serves Wellington County.

=== Radio ===
The Grand 101 FM CICW-FM is a not-for-profit community radio station that broadcasts a hot adult contemporary format with local news and specialty programming. Stations from Guelph and Waterloo Region are also receivable.

== Notable people ==
- Arthur Black, writer and radio broadcaster
- Robert Black, Canadian Senator
- Lori Bowden, professional triathlete
- Ed Chadwick, former National Hockey League player and scout
- Michael Chong, Wellington-Halton Hills MP, former federal cabinet minister, raised in Fergus
- J.M. Frey, science fiction/fantasy author
- Abraham Groves, physician
- Ryan Laird, country musician
- Bucko McDonald, former Member of Parliament and National Hockey League player
- Brock McGinn, National Hockey League player
- Jamie McGinn, National Hockey League player
- Tye McGinn, professional ice hockey player
- William A. Paterson, manufacturer of Paterson automobiles
- Frank Sargent, president of the Canadian Amateur Hockey Association and Dominion Curling Association

== Twin cities ==
- Blairgowrie and Rattray, Scotland
- Pleasanton, California, United States

== Sources ==
- Mattaini Mestern, Pat (2008). Fergus: A Scottish Town by Birthright. Fergus, ON: Pat Mattaini Mestern. ISBN 978-1-55002-884-3.
