= Wellington District, Upper Canada =

Former district of Upper Canada

Wellington District
- Former district
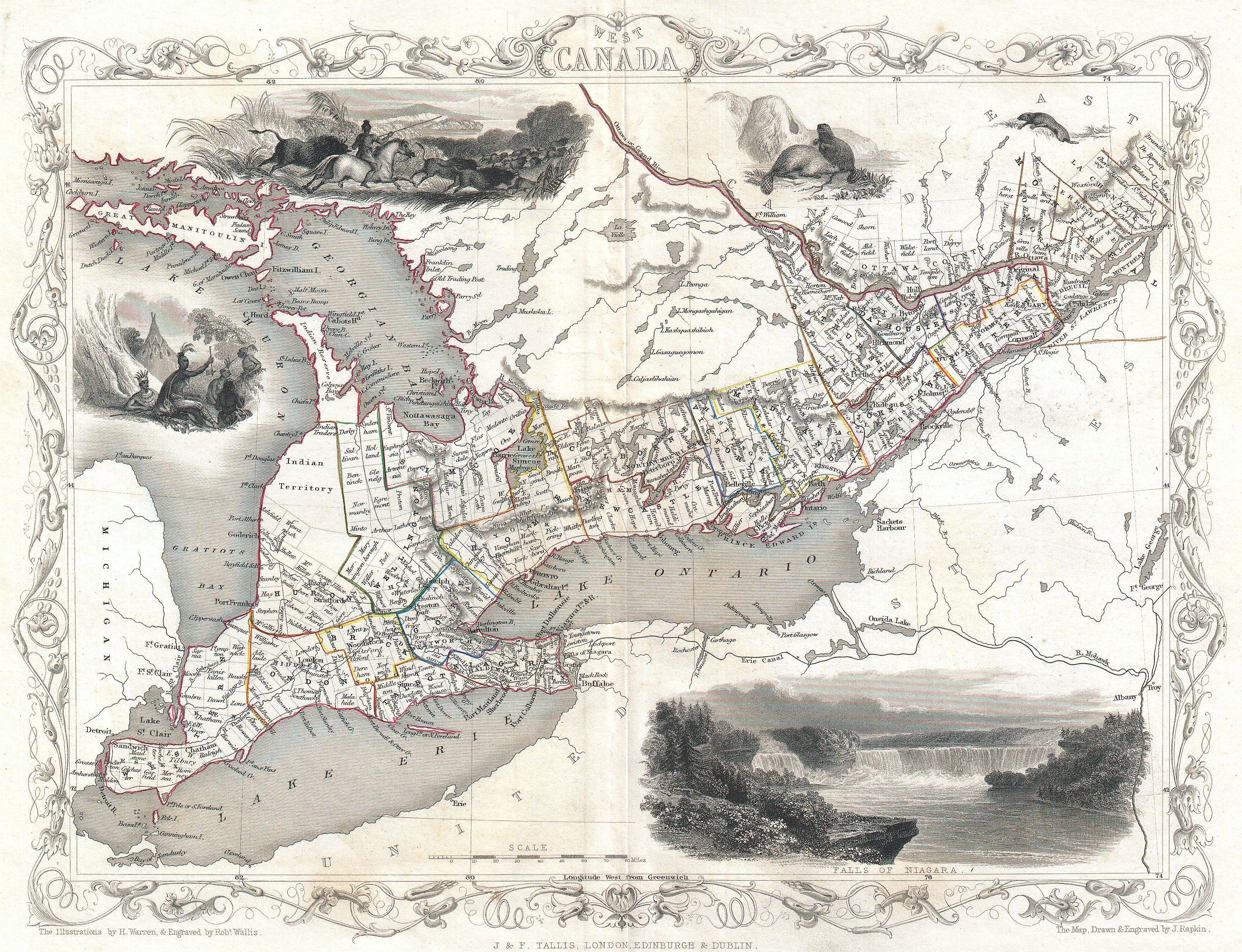
- Map of Canada West in 1850, with the Wellington District outlined in green. The outline mistakenly excludes Puslinch Township.
- Coordinates: 43.572°N 80.302°W
- Country: The Canadas (1840–41); Province of Canada (1841–)
- Province: Upper Canada (1840–41); Canada West (1841–)
- Established: June 1840
- Dissolved: 1849
- District town: Guelph

The Wellington District was a historic district in Upper Canada and its successor, Canada West, which existed until 1849. It was formed in June 1840 from townships transferred from certain other districts:

Townships transferred to the Wellington District (1840)
District	County	Townships	Other lands
Gore	Halton	Dumfries; Eramosa; Erin; Garafraxa; Guelph; Nichol; Puslinch; Waterloo; Wilmot; Woolwich	
Home	Simcoe	Amaranth; Luther; Melancthon; Proton	
London	–		reserved lands west of Woolwich and Nichol (Note: later surveyed to form the townships of Wellesley and Peel); the triangular piece of land adjoining the said tract in the proposed District of Huron (Note: later surveyed to form the townships of Maryborough and Wallace); part of the late purchase from the Indians of Gore, (Note: being the Mississaugas) and part of Indian lands (Note: acquired under the Saugeen Tract Agreement) (Note: the sum of which was surveyed into townships on either side of the Garafraxa Road that was constructed in the period 1840-1848 to the new community of Sydenham)

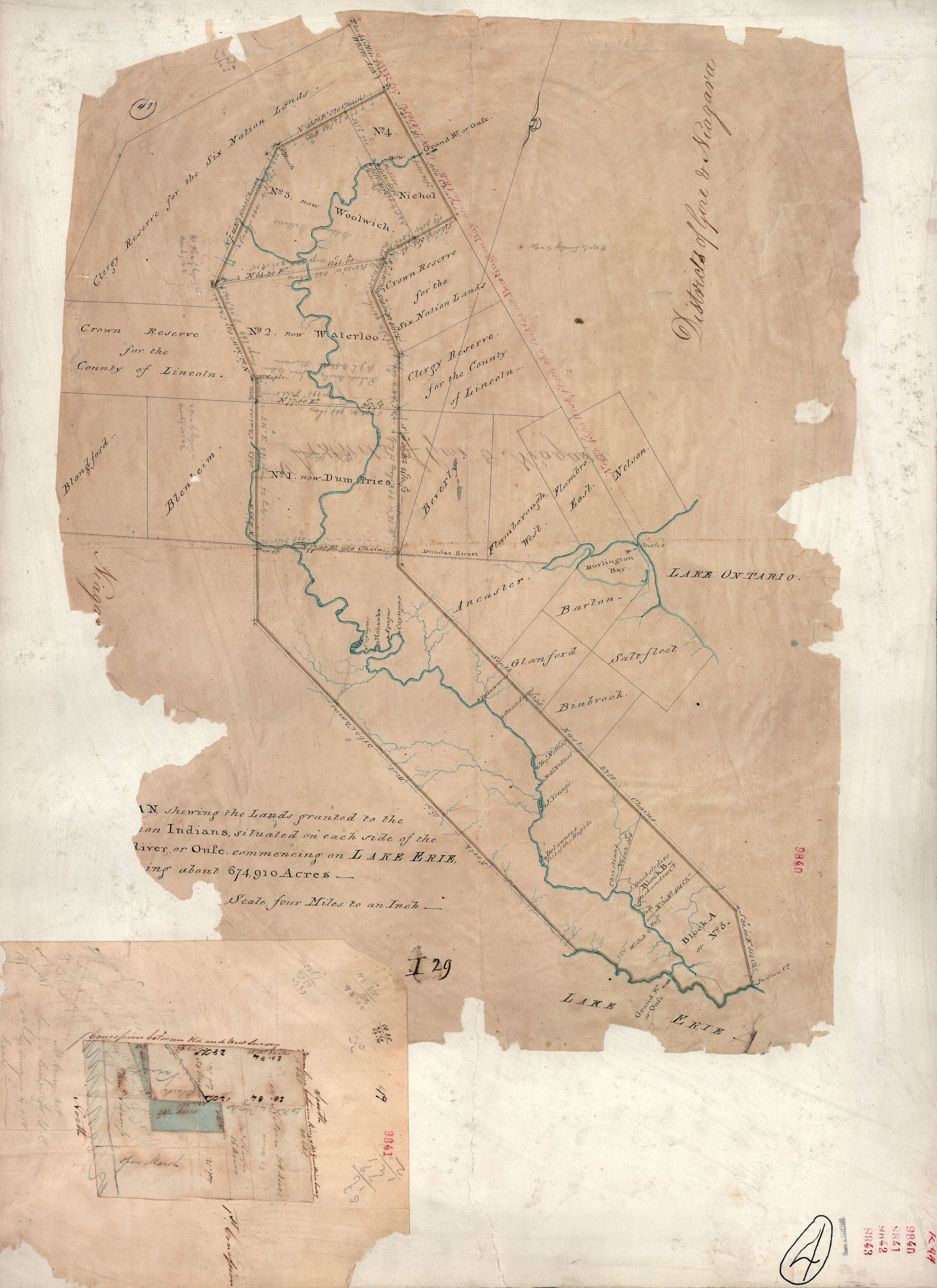
Thomas Ridout survey of 1821. The northern section shows Blocks 1–4, together with surrounding Crown reserves and Clergy reserves, that became part of Wellington District in 1838.

For electoral purposes, it was called Waterloo County and the district town was Guelph.

Upon the passage of the Act of Union 1840, for electoral purposes Erin Township was attached to Halton County, which became known as the East Riding of Halton, and the remaining townships of Wellington that had previously been part of Halton became known as the West Riding of Halton.

When the East and West Ridings were renamed for their respective counties in 1845, the township of Erin continued to be part of Halton for electoral purposes, and the township of Dumfries was similarly included for such purposes in Waterloo. At that time, Waterloo County was declared to consist of the following townships:

- Arthur
- Amaranth
- Bentinck
- Derby
- Eramosa
- Egremont
- Guelph
- Glenelg
- Garafraxa
- Holland
- Luther
- Mornington
- Minto
- Maryborough
- Melancthon
- Normanby
- Nichol
- Peel
- Proton
- Puslinch
- Sydenham
- Sullivan
- Waterloo
- Wilmot
- Woolwich
- Wellesley

In 1849, Wellington District was abolished, and Waterloo County remained for municipal and judicial purposes. The territory of the Bruce Peninsula became part of Waterloo in 1849, but was later withdrawn and transferred to Bruce County in 1851.
