= Adam Ferguson (photographer) =

Australian freelance photographer

- Born: Adam Ferguson; October 1978 (age 47); Sydney, New South Wales, Australia
- Education: Griffith University
- Known for: Photography
- Website: adamfergusonstudio.com

Adam Ferguson (born 1978) is an Australian freelance photographer who lives in New York City. His commissioned work has appeared in New York, Time, Vanity Fair, The New York Times Magazine, The New York Times, The New Yorker, Wired, and National Geographic, among others. Ferguson's work focuses on conflict and on civilians caught amidst geopolitical forces. His portraits of various head's of state have appeared on numerous Time covers.

== Early life ==
Ferguson was born and grew up in regional New South Wales, Australia, before studying photography at the Queensland College of Art, Griffith University. After graduating he travelled from port to port through the Caribbean and Mediterranean as crew on a sailboat to fund the launch of his photographic career.

== Career ==
Ferguson first gained recognition for his work in 2009 when he embarked on a sustained survey of the US-led war in Afghanistan, contributing to The New York Times, Time, and National Geographic. Over the years he has been the recipient of multiple awards from Photo District News, American Photography, World Press Photo, Pictures of the Year International, and the National Portrait Gallery of Australia, amongst others.

== Publications ==
- Big Sky. London: Gost, 2024. ISBN 978-1-915423-44-3.

== Awards and honours ==
- 2009 – Selected, Photo District News 30 Emerging Photographers to Watch
- 2010 – 1st Place Spot News, World Press Photo (Kabul bombing, Afghanistan for The New York Times)
- 2010 – Professional Award, Australian Reportage Photo Festival (Afghanistan for Time)
- 2010 – 1st Prize News Picture Story, Pictures of the Year International (Afghanistan)
- 2010 – 3rd Prize Spot News, Pictures of the Year International (Kabul bombing, Afghanistan for The Times)
- 2010 – Award of Excellence, Pictures of the Year International (Afghanistan for Time)
- 2011 – 1st Place News Story Multimedia, Pictures of the Year International (Witness to the Pity of War for Time)
- 2015 – Pictures of the Year International, News Picture Story Award of Excellence, 'Mount Sinjar, Iraq', for The New York Times
- 2017 – Pictures of the Year International, Third Place, Issue Reporting Picture Story, "Brexit" for the New York Times
- 2018 – Pictures of the Year International, 2nd Place, Portrait Series, "They Carried Suicide Bombs" for the New York Times
- 2018 – LensCulture Portrait Awards, 2nd Place Series, "Boko Haram Strapped Suicide Bombs to Them" for the New York Times
- 2018 – Photo District News, 1st Place, Photographer of the Year
- 2018 – Pictures of the Year International, 1st Place, Photographer of the Year
- 2018 – World Press Photo, 1st Place People Stories, "Boko Haram Strapped Suicide Bombs to Them" for The New York Times

== Major exhibitions ==
=== Solo ===
- 2013 – Iraq's Legacy, Reportage Festival of Documentary Photography, Sydney
- 2017 – Cortona on the Move International Photography Festival, Italy, "The Afghans"
- 2017 – Ballarat International Foto Biennale, Australia, "Through the Outback"

=== Group ===
- 2009 – World Press Photo, Amsterdam, the Netherlands (toured globally)
- 2012 – War/Photography Museum of Fine Arts Houston
- 2015 – National Photographic Portrait Prize, National Portrait Gallery, Australia
- 2015 – "Emerging" (A retrospective of work from photographers selected in the PDN30) Annenberg Space for Photography, Los Angeles, U.S.
- 2018 – World Press Photo, Amsterdam, the Netherlands (toured globally)
- 2018 – National Photographic Portrait Prize, National Portrait Gallery, Australia

== Collections ==
- Museum of Fine Arts Houston: 1 print (as of 26 november 2021)
