= Centre Wellington =

- Township (lower-tier)
- Township of Centre Wellington
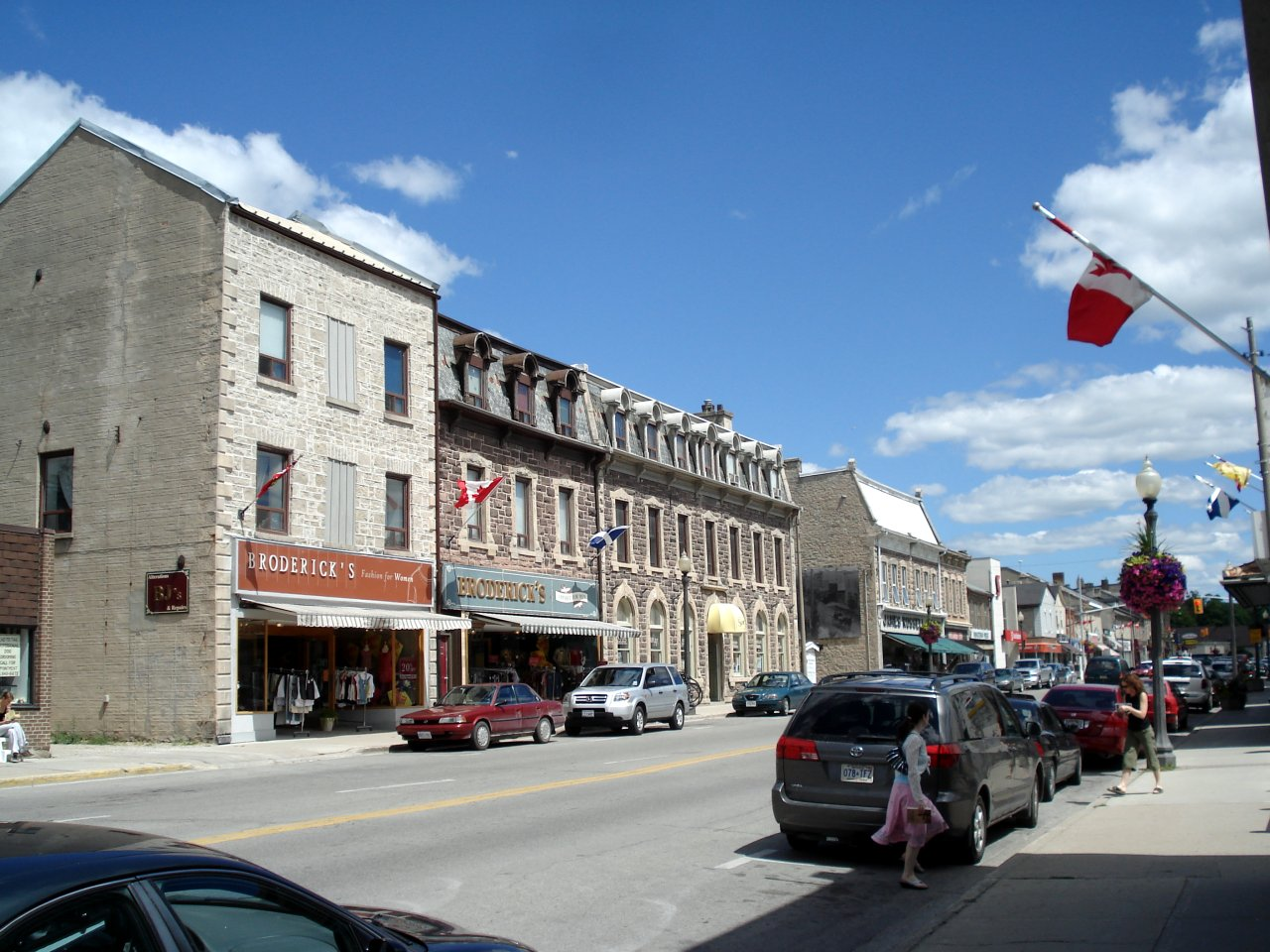
- St. Andrew Street in Fergus.

- Logo

- Location within Wellington County Location within Southern Ontario
- Coordinates: 43°42′N 80°22′W
- Country: Canada
- Province: Ontario
- County: Wellington
- Established: January 1, 1999

Government
  - Type: Township
  - Mayor: Bronwynne Wilton
  - Governing Body: Centre Wellington Township Council
  - MP: Mike Chong (Con)
  - MPP: Ted Arnott (PC)

Area
  - Land: 407.54 km^{2} (157.35 sq mi)

Population (2016)
  - Total: 28,191
  - Density: 69.2/km^{2} (179/sq mi)
- Time zone: UTC-5 (EST)
  - Summer (DST): UTC-4 (EDT)
- Postal Code FSA: N1M, N0B
- Area codes: 519, 226, 548
- Website: www.centrewellington.ca

Centre Wellington is a township in south-central Ontario, Canada, located in Wellington County. The primary communities are Elora and Fergus. The area is agricultural but also includes industries such as manufacturing. In the Canada 2016 Census, the population was stated as 28,191.

== History ==
The township was established on January 1, 1999, by amalgamating Fergus, Elora, the Townships of Nichol, Pilkington, West Garafraxa and a part of Eramosa. Fergus and Elora, in particular, have interesting histories that started in the 1830s.

== Communities ==
In addition to Fergus and Elora, the township includes several small communities, hamlets and villages including; Aboyne, Belwood, Creek Bank, Cumnock, Dracon, Ennotville, Inverhaugh, Living Springs, Oustic, Pentland Corners, Ponsonby, Salem, Shiloh, Simpson Corners, Speedside and Spier.

== Demographics ==
In the 2021 Census of Population conducted by Statistics Canada, Centre Wellington had a population of 31,093 living in 11,972 of its 12,701 total private dwellings, a change of 10.3% from its 2016 population of 28,191. With a land area of 409.41 km^{2} (158.07 sq mi), it had a population density of 75.9/km^{2} (196.7/sq mi) in 2021.

According to the 2011 Canadian Census, the median age was 42.7 years old, a bit higher than the national median at 40.6 years old. According to the 2011 National Household Survey, the median value of a dwelling in Centre Wellington was $300,625, a bit higher than the national average at $280,552. The median household income (after-taxes) in Centre Wellington was $66,764, higher than the national average at $54,089.

Most of Centre Wellington's population in 2011 was of European descent; the following is the racial breakdown:

- 96.5% White
- 2.1% Aboriginal; 1.4% First Nations, 0.7% Metis
- 0.4% South Asian
- 0.3% East Asian; 0.3% Chinese, 0.0% Korean, 0.0% Japanese
- 0.2% Latin American
- 0.2% Black
- 0.1% Southeast Asian; 0.1% Filipino
- 0.0% Arab
- 0.0% West Asian
- 0.0% Multiracial; 0.7% including Metis
- 0.2% Other

Centre Wellington Historical populations
Year	Pop.	±%
1996	21,786	—
2001	24,260	+11.4%
2006	26,049	+7.4%
2011	26,693	+2.5%
2016	28,191	+5.6%
2021	31,093	+10.3%

== Economy ==
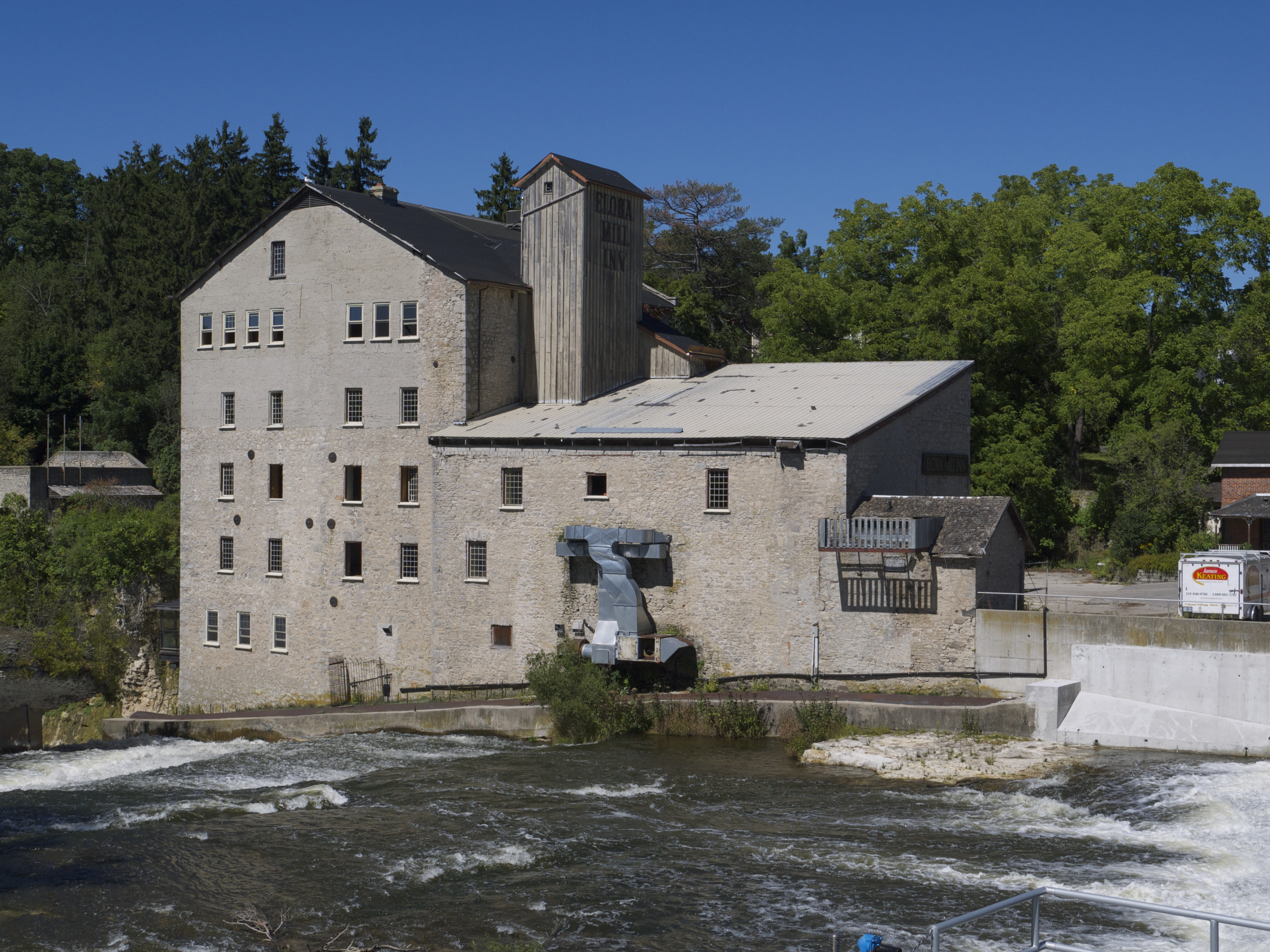
The Elora Mill

Centre Wellington is heavily agricultural but is also the home to industries, manufacturers, retailers, health care services and trades people. The local economy also benefits greatly from tourism. At the time of the 2011 census, 6.4% of the workforce of Centre Wellington was involved in agriculture and other resource-based industries/utilities, 24.8% in manufacturing and construction, 19.8% in health and education and 13.2% in wholesale and retail trade. The top three categories for employment (in order of importance) were in Manufacturing, Healthcare and Agriculture. The major employers in the township include Jefferson Elora Corp., Nexans Canada, Polycorp Ltd., Groves Memorial Hospital, Wellington Terrace and PR Donnelly. The average real estate value, for a single detached home in 2014 was $342,817 in Centre Wellington.

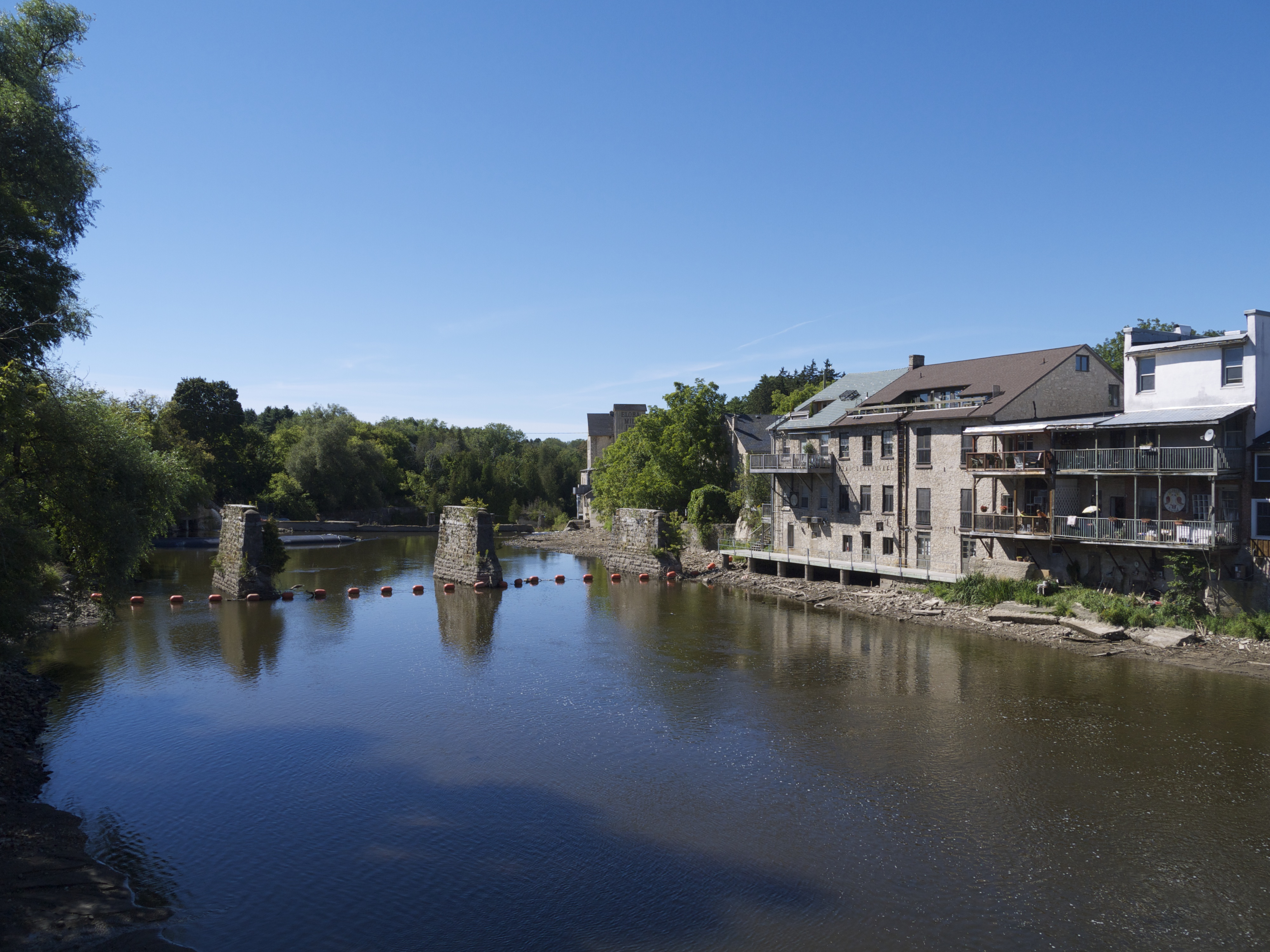
Restored buildings on Water St.; shops and restaurants line the Grand River in the downtown area.

Many tourists visit Centre Wellington, especially Elora, on daytrips, attracted by the historic nature of the towns or the Grand River Raceway with horse racing and slot machines. Also at the edge of town, the Elora Gorge Conservation Area often fills to capacity on summer weekends. The park offers paddleboat rentals, hiking, camp-grounds, fishing and picnicking. Also operated by the Grand River Conservation Authority, the nearby Elora Quarry is a popular swimming area. The annual Elora Festival (2 weeks in July) is particularly popular; the headliner in 2017 was Gordon Lightfoot. The Elora mill, built in the 1830s, was a hotel until 2010. It was restored to luxury level and reopened as the Elora Mill Inn and Spa on July 6, 2018.

The township encourages the filming of movies and TV shows; quite a few productions have taken advantage of the historic look of Fergus and especially Elora for location work. For example, in 2016, parts of the 10-part mini-series, Canada: The Story of Us, were filmed in Elora which stood in for scenes of WW II skirmishes in Holland and France.

== Local government ==
Township council includes a mayor and six councillors. Three of the latter live in Fergus while one lives in Elora. The Township is also represented on the County of Wellington Council which is made up of seven mayors and nine councillors. The head of this council is the Warden.

The township of Centre Wellington has an active historical society and operates the Wellington County Museum and Archives in a historic stone building in Aboyne, halfway between Elora and Fergus, Ontario. This two-storey Italianate stone building was the earliest known state-supported poorhouse or almshouse in Canada, called the Wellington County House of Industry and Refuge when it opened in 1877. Subsequently, the home switched to caring for the elderly and chronically ill, eventually closing in 1971. The building was designated a National Historic Site of Canada in 1995.

=== Climate ===
This township has a humid continental climate (Dfb) under the Köppen climate classification with cold winters and warm summers.

Climate data for Fergus (1981−2010)
Month	Jan	Feb	Mar	Apr	May	Jun	Jul	Aug	Sep	Oct	Nov	Dec	Year
Record high °C (°F)	15.6 (60.1)	12.0 (53.6)	23.9 (75.0)	29.0 (84.2)	32.0 (89.6)	34.0 (93.2)	35.5 (95.9)	35.0 (95.0)	35.0 (95.0)	28.9 (84.0)	24.4 (75.9)	17.5 (63.5)	35.5 (95.9)
Mean daily maximum °C (°F)	−3.6 (25.5)	−2.1 (28.2)	2.6 (36.7)	10.4 (50.7)	17.5 (63.5)	22.8 (73.0)	25.2 (77.4)	24.2 (75.6)	19.8 (67.6)	12.7 (54.9)	5.4 (41.7)	−0.7 (30.7)	11.2 (52.2)
Daily mean °C (°F)	−7.4 (18.7)	−6.3 (20.7)	−1.9 (28.6)	5.7 (42.3)	12.2 (54.0)	17.5 (63.5)	20.0 (68.0)	19.0 (66.2)	14.9 (58.8)	8.3 (46.9)	2.1 (35.8)	−3.9 (25.0)	6.7 (44.1)
Mean daily minimum °C (°F)	−11.1 (12.0)	−10.5 (13.1)	−6.5 (20.3)	0.9 (33.6)	6.9 (44.4)	12.2 (54.0)	14.7 (58.5)	13.8 (56.8)	9.9 (49.8)	3.9 (39.0)	−1.2 (29.8)	−7.1 (19.2)	2.2 (36.0)
Record low °C (°F)	−35 (−31)	−32.8 (−27.0)	−31.7 (−25.1)	−18.9 (−2.0)	−6.1 (21.0)	−0.6 (30.9)	2.2 (36.0)	−0.6 (30.9)	−5 (23)	−11.7 (10.9)	−18.3 (−0.9)	−34.4 (−29.9)	−35 (−31)
Average precipitation mm (inches)	67.9 (2.67)	55.9 (2.20)	59.6 (2.35)	74.1 (2.92)	86.9 (3.42)	83.8 (3.30)	89.2 (3.51)	96.6 (3.80)	93.1 (3.67)	77.2 (3.04)	93.0 (3.66)	68.6 (2.70)	945.7 (37.23)
Average rainfall mm (inches)	27.8 (1.09)	25.3 (1.00)	36.7 (1.44)	67.9 (2.67)	86.8 (3.42)	83.8 (3.30)	89.2 (3.51)	96.6 (3.80)	93.1 (3.67)	75.6 (2.98)	80.5 (3.17)	34.7 (1.37)	797.8 (31.41)
Average snowfall cm (inches)	40.1 (15.8)	30.6 (12.0)	22.9 (9.0)	6.2 (2.4)	0.1 (0.0)	0.0 (0.0)	0.0 (0.0)	0.0 (0.0)	0.0 (0.0)	1.6 (0.6)	12.5 (4.9)	33.9 (13.3)	147.8 (58.2)
Average precipitation days (≥ 0.2 mm)	19.7	14.9	14.0	14.6	14.4	12.0	11.5	12.4	13.9	16.5	17.4	18.3	179.5
Average rainy days (≥ 0.2 mm)	4.7	4.5	7.4	12.9	14.3	12.0	11.5	12.4	13.9	16.3	13.1	6.8	129.7
Average snowy days (≥ 0.2 cm)	16.5	11.8	8.2	2.8	0.15	0.0	0.0	0.0	0.0	0.73	5.6	13.2	59.0
Source: Environment Canada

== Sports ==
Centre Wellington recently expanded the community centre in Fergus which now has two ice pads, a pool, a hall and a gym. The complex plays host to the Centre Wellington Fusion & Mustangs minor hockey associations, the Centre Wellington Thistles jr C minor lacrosse team, the Centre Wellington Riverhawks (formerly Mohawks) minor Lacrosse association, and the Fergus Flippers aquatic club. The Elora arena plays host to the Elora Rocks Sr.A hockey team, the Elora Mohawks Jr.B lacrosse team, and The Edge Ringette association. The Inverhaugh Cricket Club is the only privately owned turf wicket in Canada used for cricket. Highland Park is the home to Centre Wellington Minor Softball Association which has been providing safe and fun softball to families in CW for decades. They now offer Softball to both kids AND Adults to better serve the entire family and keep the people of Centre Wellington active. Fergus is also home to the Highland Rugby Club and the Fergus-Elora District Soccer Club (FEDS).

Fergus Curling Club, Ontario's oldest continuously running Curling Club, was founded in 1834 by settlers from Scotland. Adam Fergusson was the first president. Matches were held outdoors until 1879 when an indoor rink was opened.

Also noted in the 2024-25 season, the u15 select team won the tri-county playoffs. making a historical moment in fusion hockey history. Source: https://www.wellingtonadvertiser.com/centre-wellington-fusion-u15-select-team-celebrate-first-place-win/

== Media ==
Centre Wellington is covered by local newspapers, television and local radio through the following services:

- The Wellington Advertiser
- TVCogeco
- EloraFergusToday
- The Grand @ 101 (101.1 FM)

== See also ==
- List of townships in Ontario
- Wellington County, Ontario
- Grand River (Ontario)
- Fergus, Ontario
- Elora, Ontario
