= Legislative buildings of Canada =

There are currently fourteen legislative buildings in Canada: Parliament in Ottawa, and one for each of the provinces and territories of Canada, though not all contain the words legislative building in their names.

== Current ==
Picture	Name	Location	Years of construction
	: Parliament Buildings of Canada	Ottawa, Ontario; 45.424807°N 75.699234°W	1859-1876 (Centre Block: 1916-1927)
	: Legislative Building of Alberta	Edmonton; 53.533714°N 113.506531°W	1907–1913
	: Parliament Buildings of British Columbia	Victoria; 48.419631°N 123.370261°W	1893–1897
	: Legislative Building of Manitoba	Winnipeg; 49.884394°N 97.146918°W	1913–1920
	: Legislative Building of New Brunswick	Fredericton; 45.959325°N 66.636103°W	1882
	: Confederation Building (Newfoundland and Labrador)	St. John's; 47°35′00.27″N 52°43′25.71″W	1960
	: Legislative Building of the Northwest Territories	Yellowknife; 62.459384°N 114.382042°W	1993
	: Province House (Nova Scotia)	Halifax; 44.64791°N 63.573396°W	1819
	: Legislative Building of Nunavut	Iqaluit; 63°45′01″N 068°31′23″W	1998–1999
	: Legislative Building of Ontario	Toronto; 43.662447°N 79.391708°W	1886–1893
	: Province House (Prince Edward Island)	Charlottetown; 46.234927°N 63.126084°W	1843–1847
	: Parliament Building of Quebec	Quebec City; 46.808762°N 71.214178°W	1877–1886
	: Legislative Building of Saskatchewan	Regina; 50.432426°N 104.615099°W	1908–1912
	: Legislative Building of Yukon	Whitehorse; 60.716948°N 135.049374°W	1976

== Former ==
- Bonsecours Market, Montreal, United Province of Canada, (1849)
- Colonial Building, St. John's, Colony of Newfoundland (1850–1907), Dominion of Newfoundland (1907–1949), Province of Newfoundland (1949–1959)
- First Ontario Parliament Buildings, Toronto, Upper Canada (1832–1841), United Province of Canada (intermittently 1849–1859), Ontario (1867–1893)
- Navy Hall, Niagara-on-the-Lake, Upper Canada (1792–1796)
- Episcopal Palace, Quebec City, Province of Quebec (1777–1791), Lower Canada (1791–1840), United Province of Canada (1850–1853)
- Old Parliament Building (Quebec), Quebec City, United Province of Canada (1853–1854)
- Canadian Museum of Nature, Ottawa, federal Parliament (1916–19)
- Kingston General Hospital, Kingston, United Province of Canada, (1841-1844)

== See also ==
- Burning of the Parliament Buildings in Montreal (1849)
