= Old Parliament Building (Quebec) =

Parliament buildings from 1791 to 1883, Canada

Coordinates: 46.813674°N 71.204195°W

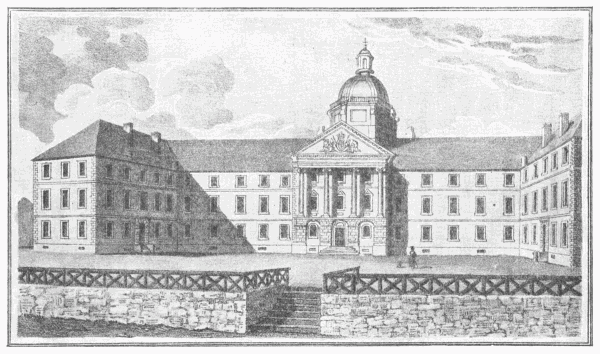

Old Parliament Building (Quebec) (French: Ancien bâtiment du Parlement) was the site of the seat of government of Lower Canada (1791–1833), Canada West, Province of Canada and Quebec (1867–1883).

It was located in what is Parc Montmorency today, the site of two Parliament buildings from 1791 to 1883 at the Chapel of Bishop's Palace and later within the grounds of the Bishop's Palace.

== History ==
The first building on the site was the Chapel of Bishop's Palace, which was ordered built by Bishop Saint-Vallier from 1693 to 1695 to replace a stone house purchased by Saint-Vallier in 1688.

In 1777 the building was rented to the British government to house the Legislative Council under orders from then Governor General Guy Carleton, 1st Baron Dorchester. From 1791 to 1838 it was home to the House of Assembly and Legislative Council of Lower Canada.

== Chronology of Parliament Buildings of Quebec ==
1st Parliament Buildings:

- 1777 British government rents the Chapel of Bishop's Palace within the Episcopal Palace of Quebec for the Legislative Council
- 1830s demolition of Chapel of Bishop's Palace (1833) and addition added with new main building and first wing of new Parliament Buildings to the Episcopal Palace (1830–1831)
- 1840 Quebec no longer capital and buildings becomes vacant with the establishment of the Province of Canada (rotated between Kingston, Montreal and Toronto)
- 1852 Parliament returns to the Episcopal Palace site and new Parliament still under construction
- 1852–1853 Episcopal Palace is demolished as new Parliament construction continues
- 1854 new Parliament Buildings nearing completion but destroyed by fire
- 1854–1859 Parliament relocates to two locations:
  - Quebec Music Hall (or Academy of Music) on rue St. Louis - a three-storey Greek Revival structure built by Charles Baillairge from 1851 to 1853; it burned down in 1900
  - Quebec City Courthouse – a three-storey wooden building built between 1799 and 1804; it burned down in 1873 (now home to Old Courthouse of Quebec)

2nd Parliament Buildings:

- 1859–1860 new Parliament Building at Côte de la Montagne completed and served sessions from 1860 to 1865
- 1866 capital of the Province of Canada moves to Ottawa for final time (and becomes federal Parliament in 1867), and Quebec buildings becomes vacant briefly
- 1867–1883 the province of Quebec is created and the Parliament Buildings is designated home to new provincial Parliament
- 1883 Parliament Buildings destroyed in fire and relocated to the current buildings (began construction in 1877 and nearing completion
- 1884 – Parliament moved to the current Parliament Building (Quebec); the old building is demolished and reopened known as Parc Montmorency in 1894

The 2nd parliament building was a Greek Revival structure with a dome in the central structure flanked by two wings. Built between 1830 and 1850, it was destroyed by a fire in 1854.

The building's interior is featured in Robert Harris' 1884 painting Conference at Quebec in 1864.

== Chronology of the seat of government of the Province of Canada ==
From 1841 to 1866, the seat of government of the Province of Canada moved six times, between five different cities. The Legislative Assembly and the Legislative Council sat in various buildings in each city.

Location of the Seat of Government
Years	City	Buildings
1841 to 1843	Kingston, Canada West	Kingston Hospital
1844 to 1849	Montreal, Canada East	(1) Parliament Building (1844 to 1849) (2) Bonsecours Market (1849) (Note: Temporary location after the Parliament Building was burnt by rioters, April 25, 1849.)
1850 to 1851	Toronto, Canada West	Parliament Buildings of Upper Canada
1852 to 1854	Quebec, Canada East	Episcopal Palace
1855 to 1859	Toronto, Canada West	Parliament Buildings of Upper Canada
1860 to 1865	Quebec, Canada East	Old Parliament Building
1866	Ottawa	Parliament Buildings

Preceded by Parliament Buildings, Toronto, Canada West, 1850–1851	Parliament of the Province of Canada; 1852–1854	Succeeded by Parliament Buildings, Toronto, Canada West, 1855–1859

Preceded by Parliament Buildings, Toronto, Canada West, 1855–1859	Parliament of the Province of Canada; 1860–1865	Succeeded by Centre Block, Ottawa, Canada West, 1866
