= St. Anne's Market =

Coordinates: 45°30′02″N 73°33′22″W

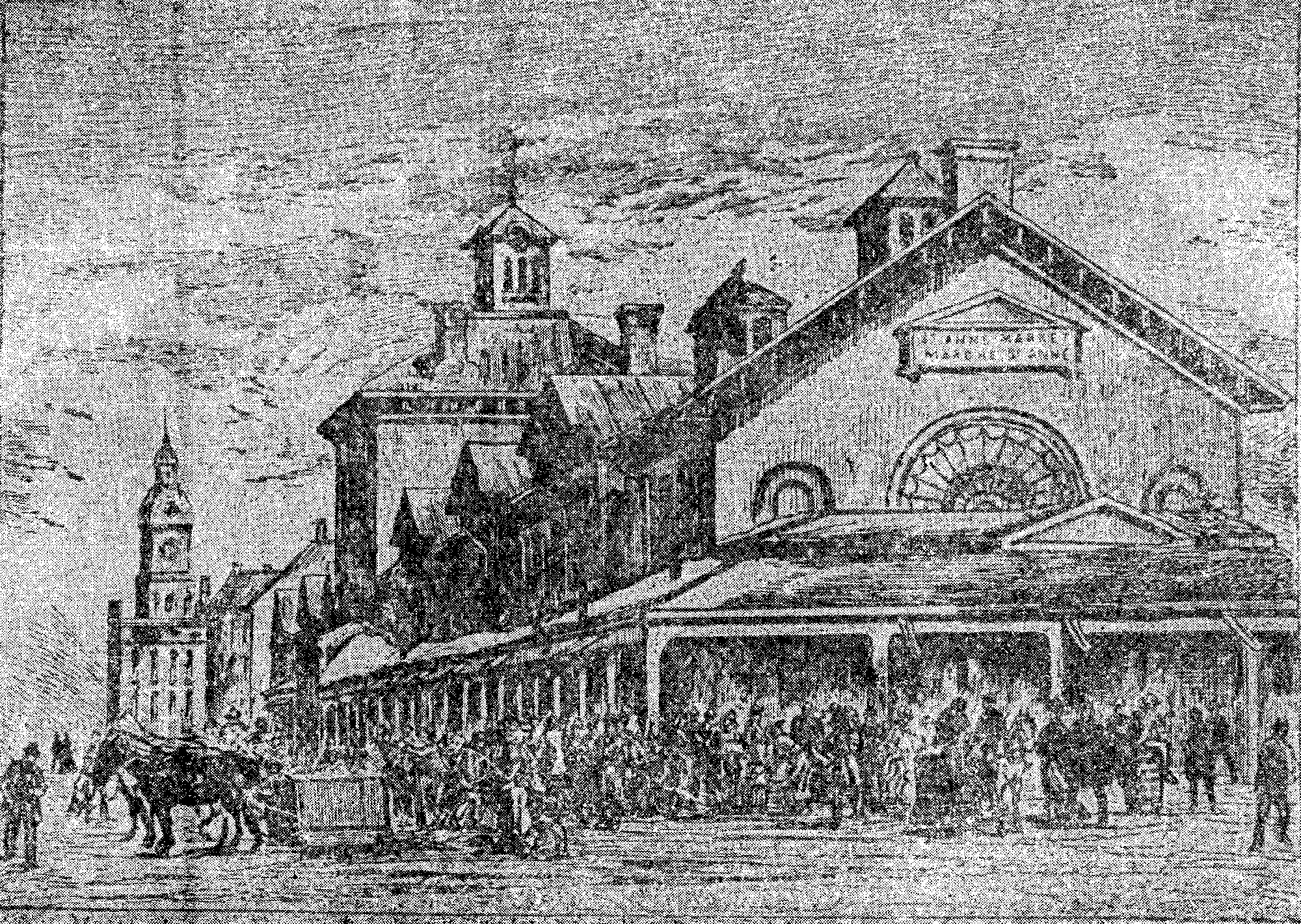
Engraving of St. Anne's Market, from the Canadian Illustrated News in 1880

St. Anne's Market (French: Marché Sainte-Anne) was a public auction house located at Place d'Youville in Old Montreal. From 1844 to 1849, it served as the home of the Legislative Council and Assembly during the pre-Confederation era. On April 25, 1849, the building was burned down by Loyalist rioters.

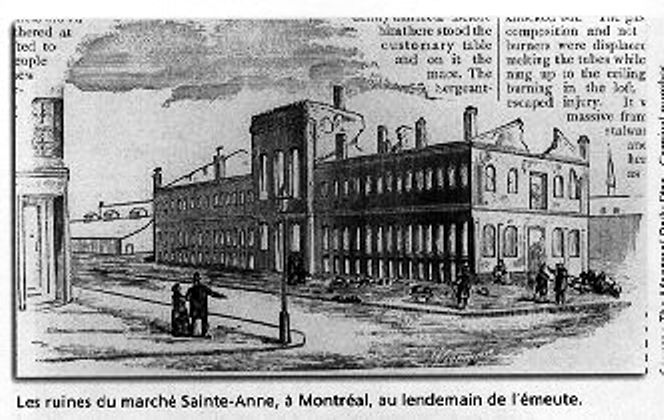
Parliament in ruins with temporary market building in the background c. 1849

== History ==
The original St. Anne's Market was built in 1832 to accommodate produce stalls in Old Montreal. Merchants sold fruit, vegetables, grains, meat, and fish in approximately 60 stalls. The two-storey, 100-metre-long (330 ft) Georgian building was designed by John Wells and Francis Thompson and was built atop a section of the Little River.

The market was acquired by the municipal government in 1842, and became the first permanent provincial seat of government after the parliament was moved in 1844 from Kingston to Montreal; the first legislative session at the St. Anne's Market site was held on November 28, 1844. A new wooden building was built to house a new replacement market directly north and on east side of rue St. Pierre. After the Parliament fire in 1849 St Anne’s returned to that site and the wood replacement became a fish market. The fish market gave way to Central Fire Station in 1904 an now used as Centre d'histoire de Montréal).

The passage of the Rebellion Losses Bill on the night of April 25, 1849, led to the sacking and arson of the St. Anne's Market parliamentary building. The fire, set by Loyalist rioters attempting to disrupt an ongoing Assembly session, spread to nearby building and burned rapidly. Firefighters sent to respond to the fire at St. Anne's Market were slowed by mobs of rioters, leading to the building's total destruction within two hours. Over 23,000 volumes in the parliamentary library, as well as the partial archives of Upper Canada and Lower Canada, were lost in the fire. The parliament reconvened the following day, April 26, at the Bonsecours Market, where the business of the session was finished. The capital then alternated between Toronto and Québec City until moving permanently to Ottawa.

A new stone market building, designed by George Browne, was built at the site in 1851. It was later expanded to house a fish market and warehouses. The second market was destroyed in 1901 and later replaced with a parking lot at the newly created Place d'Youville.

Since 2010, the parking lot has been the site of an archaeological excavation by the Pointe-à-Callière Museum, unearthing artifacts lost during the 1849 fire. To celebrate the 375th anniversary of Montreal's founding, the city plans to open part of the collector sewer beneath the site of St. Anne's Market in 2017.
