= Legislative Assembly of the Province of Canada =

Lower house of the legislature for the Province of Canada (1841–67)

Legislative Assembly of the Province of Canada Assemblée législative de la province du Canada

Type
- Type: Lower house of the Parliament of the Province of Canada

History
- Founded: February 10, 1841
- Disbanded: July 1, 1867
- Preceded by: Legislative Assembly of Lower Canada; Legislative Assembly of Upper Canada
- Succeeded by: House of Commons of Canada; Legislative Assembly of Ontario; Legislative Assembly of Quebec

The Legislative Assembly of the Province of Canada was the lower house of the Parliament of the Province of Canada. The Province of Canada consisted of the former province of Lower Canada, then known as Canada East (now Quebec), and Upper Canada, then known as Canada West (now Ontario). It was created by the Act of Union 1840.

Canada East and Canada West each elected 42 members to the assembly for the first four parliaments. In 1853, following the 1851 Canadian census, the number of seats in the assembly was increased by the 4th Parliament of the Province of Canada from 84 to 130, 65 for each section, even though Canada West had a slightly larger population. The Parliamentary Representation Act of June 1853 was to take effect with the election for the 5th Parliament of the Province of Canada.

The upper house of the legislature was called the Legislative Council. The two houses, the lower house and the upper house, constituted the Parliament of the Province of Canada. (See List of Parliaments below)

The first session of parliament began in Kingston in Canada West in 1841. The second parliament and the first sessions of the third parliament were held in Montreal. On April 25, 1849, rioters protesting the Rebellion Losses Bill burned the parliament buildings. The remaining sessions of the third parliament were held in Toronto. Subsequent parliaments were held in Quebec City and Toronto, except for the last session June–August 1866 of the eighth and final parliament, which was held in the newly built Parliament building in Ottawa, the capital chosen for the Dominion of Canada.

The British North America Act 1867 divided the Province of Canada into the provinces of Ontario and Quebec, each province having its own Legislative Assembly, as well as representation in the Parliament of Canada.

== Seat of Government and Parliament Buildings ==
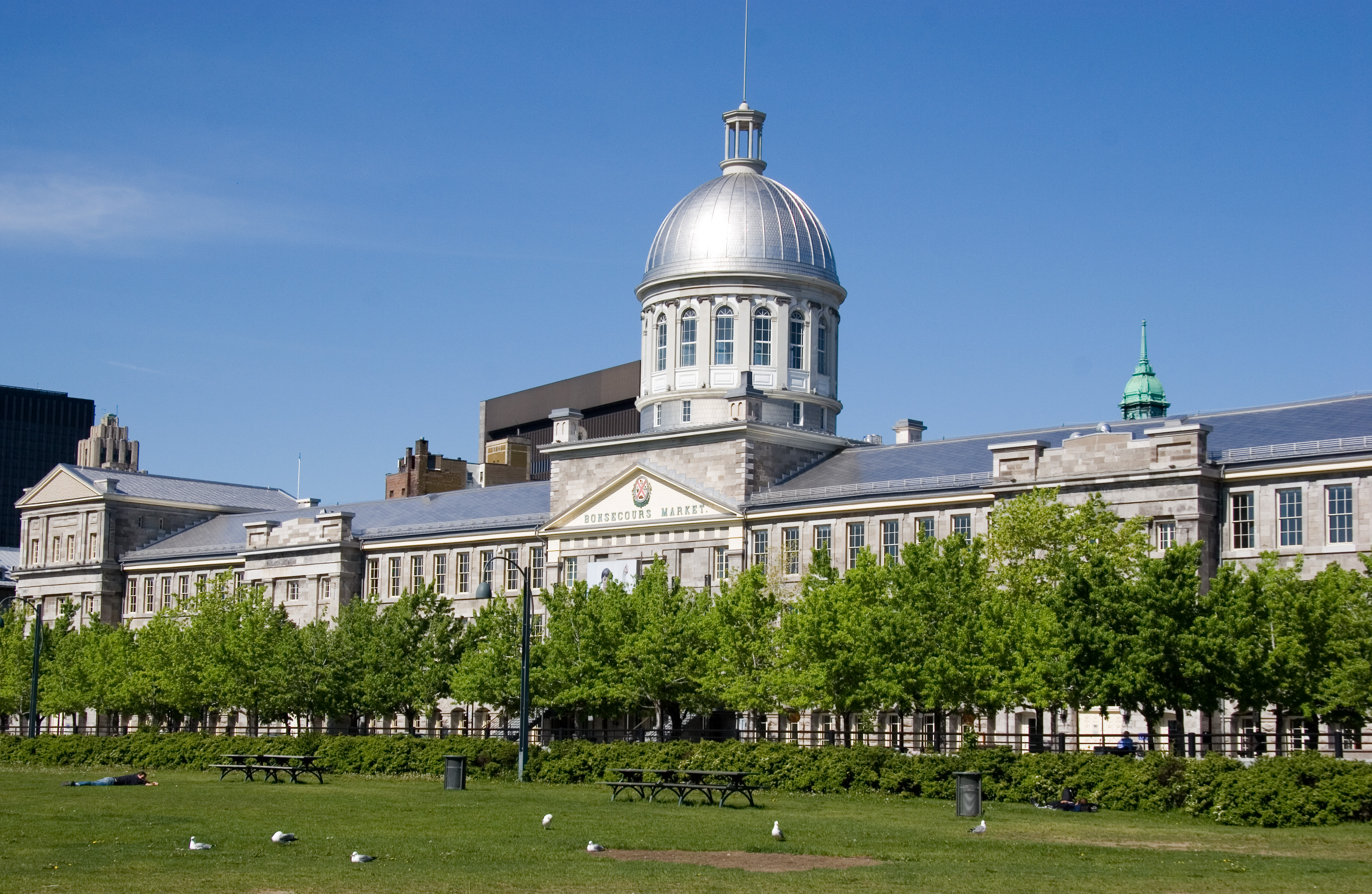
Bonsecours Market – Parliament of Province of Canada 1849

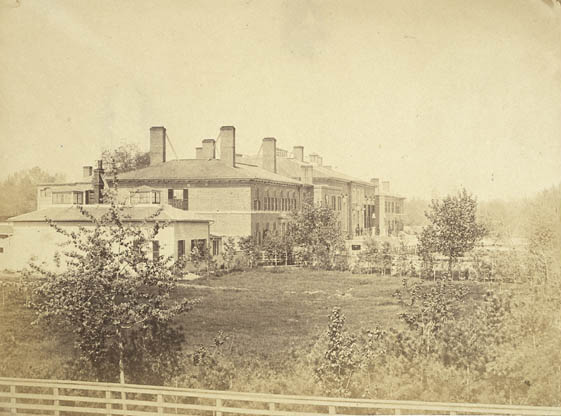
Parliament Buildings in Toronto – Parliament of Province of Canada 1849–1850 and 1859

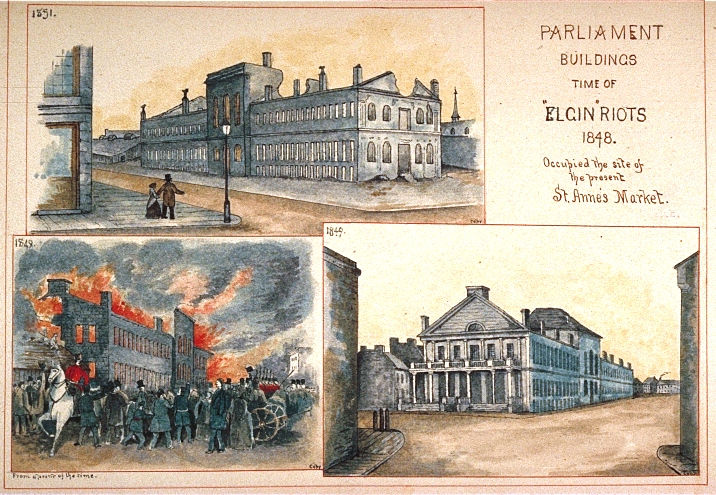
Parliament at St. Anne's Market

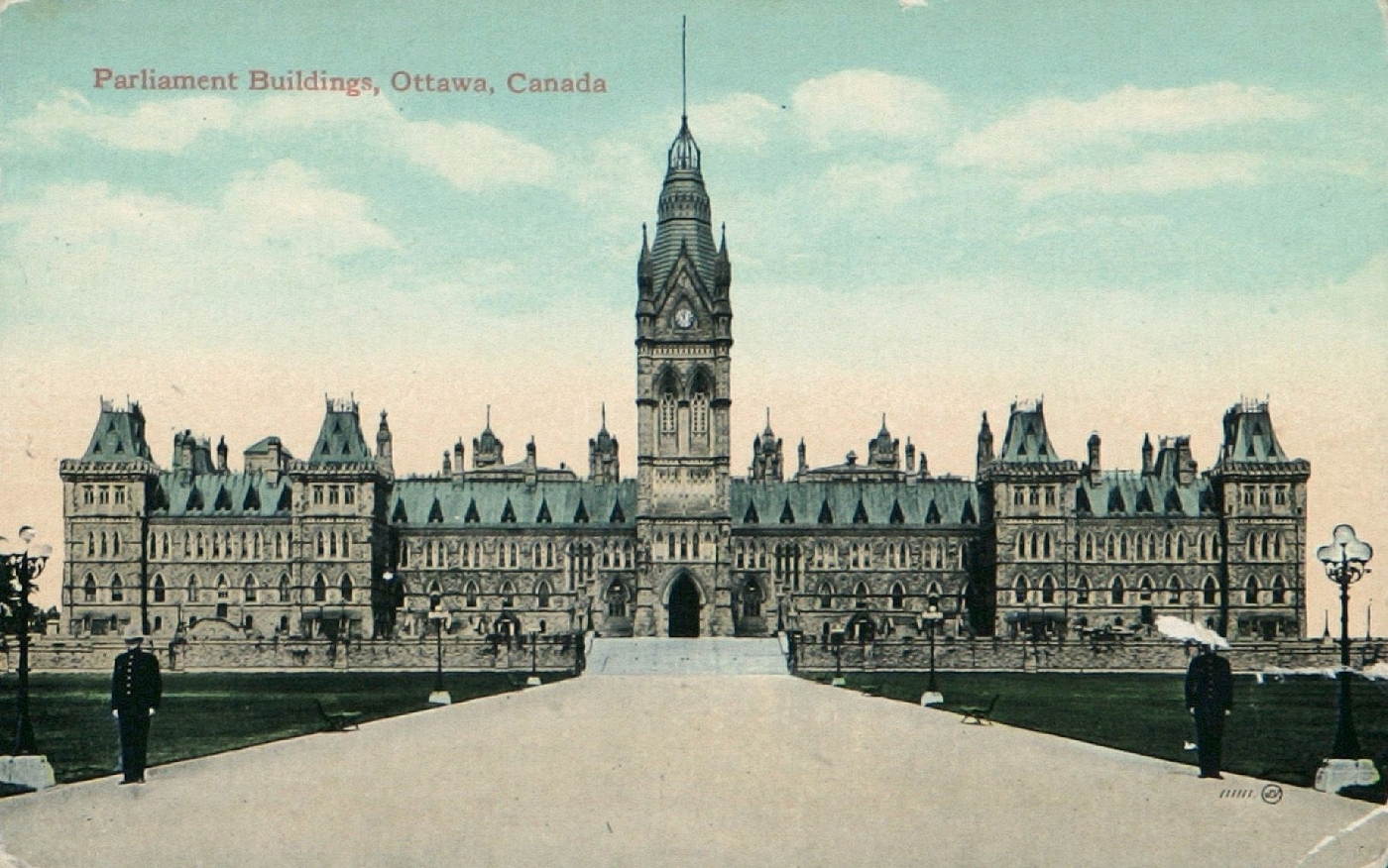
Parliament Buildings in Ottawa 1866–1867

Parliament for the Province of Canada drifted around the cities of Toronto, Kingston, Montreal, Quebec City and Ottawa. For exhaustive detail on how Parliament tried to resolve the issue of a permanent capital, see below David B. Knight, Choosing Canada's Capital: Conflict Resolution in a Parliamentary System (Carleton Library Series, 1991).

- 1841–1843 three sessions were held at the three-storey Kingston General Hospital
- 1843 Parliament moves to Montreal and sites at renovated St. Anne's Market; burned down in 1849; rebuilt as market only and burned down again in 1902; site later was a parking lot and now public square called Place d'Youville.
- 1849 temporary sites for Parliament at Bonsecours Market and the Freemasons Hall for a single session.
- 1849–1850 Parliament returns to Toronto to the site of the Third Parliament Buildings at Front and Simcoe Streets.
- 1851 Parliament relocates to Quebec City in 1851 to the Quebec Parliament Building until fire destroys the building in 1854.
- 1854–1859 Parliament remains in Quebec City and relocates to Quebec Music Hall and Quebec City Courthouse.
- 1859 Parliament returns to Toronto to the site of the last parliament held there in 1849–1851 sessions.
- 1860–1865 Parliament returns to Quebec City to the newly re-built Parliament Buildings at Parc Montmorency; re-used as Parliament of the province of Quebec 1867–1883
- 1866 Parliament assembles in Ottawa on Parliament Hill in the original Centre Block for one sitting June–August 1866. This building became the home of the Parliament of Canada July 1, 1867. It was destroyed by fire in 1916 and replaced by the current Centre Block.

== List of Parliaments ==
- 1st Parliament of the Province of Canada 1841–1844
- 2nd Parliament of the Province of Canada 1844–1848
- 3rd Parliament of the Province of Canada 1848–1852
- 4th Parliament of the Province of Canada 1852–1855
- 5th Parliament of the Province of Canada 1854–1857
- 6th Parliament of the Province of Canada 1857–1861
- 7th Parliament of the Province of Canada 1861–1863
- 8th Parliament of the Province of Canada 1863–1867

== Speakers ==
The role of speaker began a tradition of alternating between English and French Canada. This tradition carried onto the role of the Speaker of the House of Commons of Canada.

Speaker	Term	Parliament	Affiliation	Residency
Austin Cuvillier	1841–1843	1st	Parti canadien	Canada East
Sir Allan Napier MacNab	1844–1847	2nd	Reformer	Canada West
Augustin-Norbert Morin	1848–1851	3rd	Parti patriote	Canada East
John Sandfield Macdonald	1852–1853	4th	Liberal-Conservative	Canada West
Louis-Victor Sicotte	1854–1857	5th	N/A	Canada East
Sir Henry Smith	1858–1861	6th	Tory	Canada West
Joseph-Édouard Turcotte	1862–1863	7th	Reformer	Canada East
Lewis Wallbridge	1863–1866	8th	N/A	Canada West

== See also ==
- Legislative Assembly of Lower Canada – Legislature replaced by the Legislature of the Province of Canada
- Legislative Assembly of Upper Canada – Legislature replaced by the Legislature of the Province of Canada
- Legislative Assembly of Ontario – succeeding legislature for Canada West
- Legislative Assembly of Quebec – succeeding legislature for Canada East
- House of Commons of Canada – succeeding parliament replacing the Legislature of the Province of Canada
- List of by-elections in the Province of Canada

== Reading ==
- Upper Canadian politics in the 1850s, Underhill (and others), University of Toronto Press (1967)
- Alfred Todd. General Index to the Journals of the Legislative Assembly of the Province of Canada in the 4th, 5th, 6th, 7th and 8th Parliaments 1852–1866. (Ottawa: Hunter Rose & Co., 1867) https://www.canadiana.ca/view/oocihm.9_00957/3.
- David B. Knight, Choosing Canada's Capital: Conflict Resolution in a Parliamentary System (McGill-Queens University Press, 1991) https://www.jstor.org/stable/j.ctt80qgn.
