= Joseph Perrault (architect) =

- Born: Joseph; 1866; Montreal
- Died: 1923 (aged 56–57)
- Citizenship: Canada
- Occupation: Architect
- Father: Henri-Maurice Perrault

Joseph Perrault (1866–1923) was a Canadian architect. His biography is included in the Quebec Cultural Heritage Directory.

== Life and career ==
Born in Montreal, Joseph Perrault was the son of architect and surveyor Henri-Maurice Perrault and his wife Marie-Louise-Octavie Masson. After joining the Ordre des architectes du Québec in 1891 he practiced as an architect in his native city. In his early career he worked in collaboration with architect Simon Lesage with whom he notably designed the Centre d'histoire de Montréal which was built in 1903–1904. He was also the architect for the Notre-Dame-de-Bon-Secours Academy in Outremont which was built in 1909. Perrault also designed many residential and commercial buildings in Montreal during his career.
