= Alfred Perry =

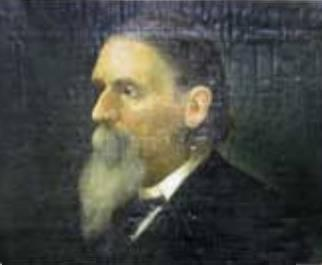
Alfred Perry

Alfred Perry was a Canadian arsonist known for being among the insurrectionist leaders that participated in the events that lead to the burning of the Parliament buildings in Montreal in 1849. According to his own testimony made several years later, he claimed to have been the one that directly caused the fire during the storming, by accident.

He was also a promoter of the Douglas Hospital.
