= Place d'Youville =

Square in Montréal, Canada

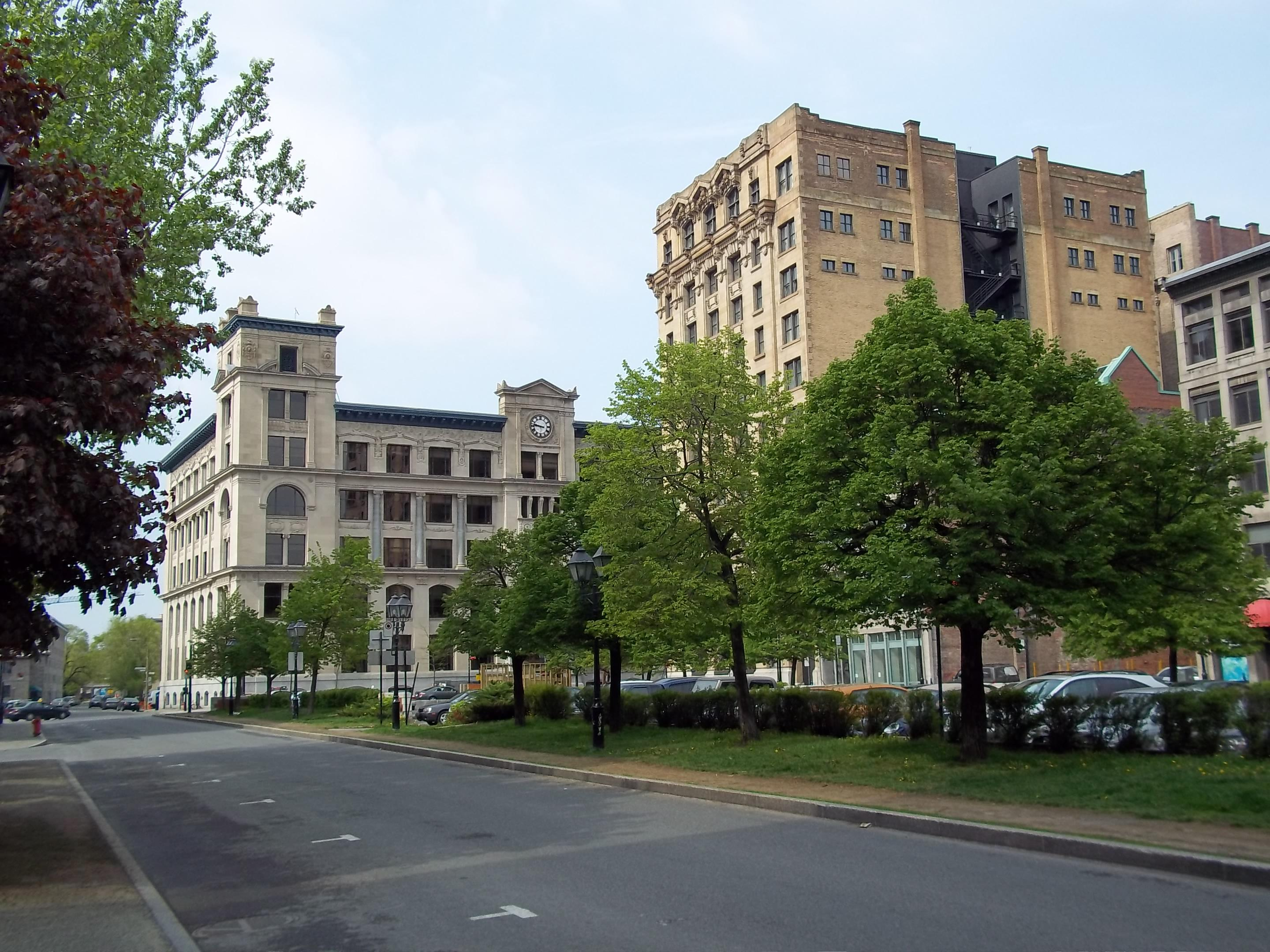
- The Grand Trunk Building viewed from Place d'Youville

- Location within Montreal
- Type: Town square
- Location: Old Montreal, Ville-Marie Montreal, Quebec, Canada
- Coordinates: 45°30′03″N 73°33′20″W
- Created: 1901
- Operator: City of Montreal
- Status: Open all year

The Place d'Youville in Old Montreal is a historical square in Montreal, named after Marguerite d'Youville. The roads from the Place Royale and McGill Street meet at this point. The square is notable as the site of St. Anne's Market, a market building that once housed the Legislative Council and Assembly of Canada between 1844 and 1849, when it was burned down on April 25, 1849.

== History ==
It was near to this spot, previously crossed by the Saint-Pierre river, that the first European inhabitants of Montreal arrived in 1642. Soon after, this frequently flooded area was abandoned in favour of the hill overlooking rue Notre-Dame.

For many years, the land around the present-day square was owned by the Old Montreal General Hospital. That hospital for the poor, built between 1692 et 1694, was run at first by the Charon Brothers then, from 1747, by the Congregation of the Sisters of Charity of Montreal, or Grey Nuns, founded by Marie-Marguerite d'Youville.

Proximity to the port gave the area a new lease of life. In 1833, the marché Sainte-Anne was built to accommodate the fruit and vegetable sellers. The Georgian building consisted of two long wings, a Portico entrance on one end and a central section topped with a smaller steeple. The marché Sainte-Anne was so attractive that the Parliament of the Province of Canada moved into it in 1844, where the representatives of Upper and Lower Canada sat (present-day south Ontario and Quebec); a second market building built in 1844 behind the new Parliament building (and later demolished in 1860) substituted the original role of the old market. It was burned down on April 25, 1849, when English-speaking demonstrators drove the representatives out and set fire to the building because they opposed the Rebellion Losses Bill, pardoning those who had been involved in the Lower Canada Rebellion. Montreal thus lost its status as capital city.

After being rebuilt in 1852, the new building was once again a public marketplace, with a fish market added later. In 1871, the Grey Nuns left for a new home on René Lévesque Boulevard, then in the countryside. The opening up of rue Saint-Pierre towards the port involved the demolition of their former chapel; only the walls and the remains of old windows are left. Other buildings met the same fate in order to create space for rue Normand. In 1901, the demolition of the St. Anne's Market and the fish market cleared out the heart of the neighbourhood, and shops, public buildings and organizational headquarters moved in. It was at that time that the City of Montreal decided to name the area "place d'Youville", after Marie-Marguerite d'Youville, one of its first residents.

== Gallery ==
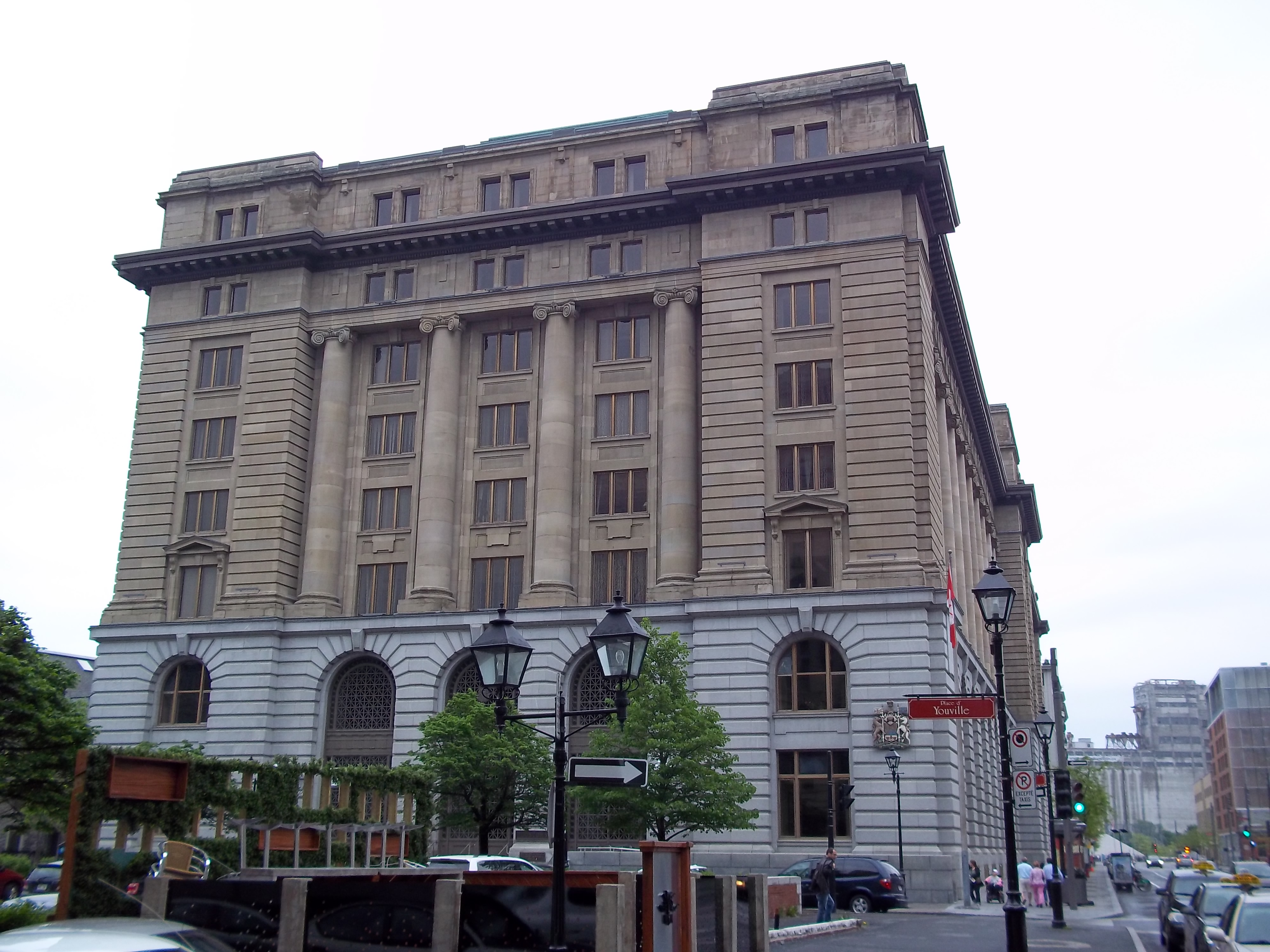
The customs house on the corner of the Rue McGill

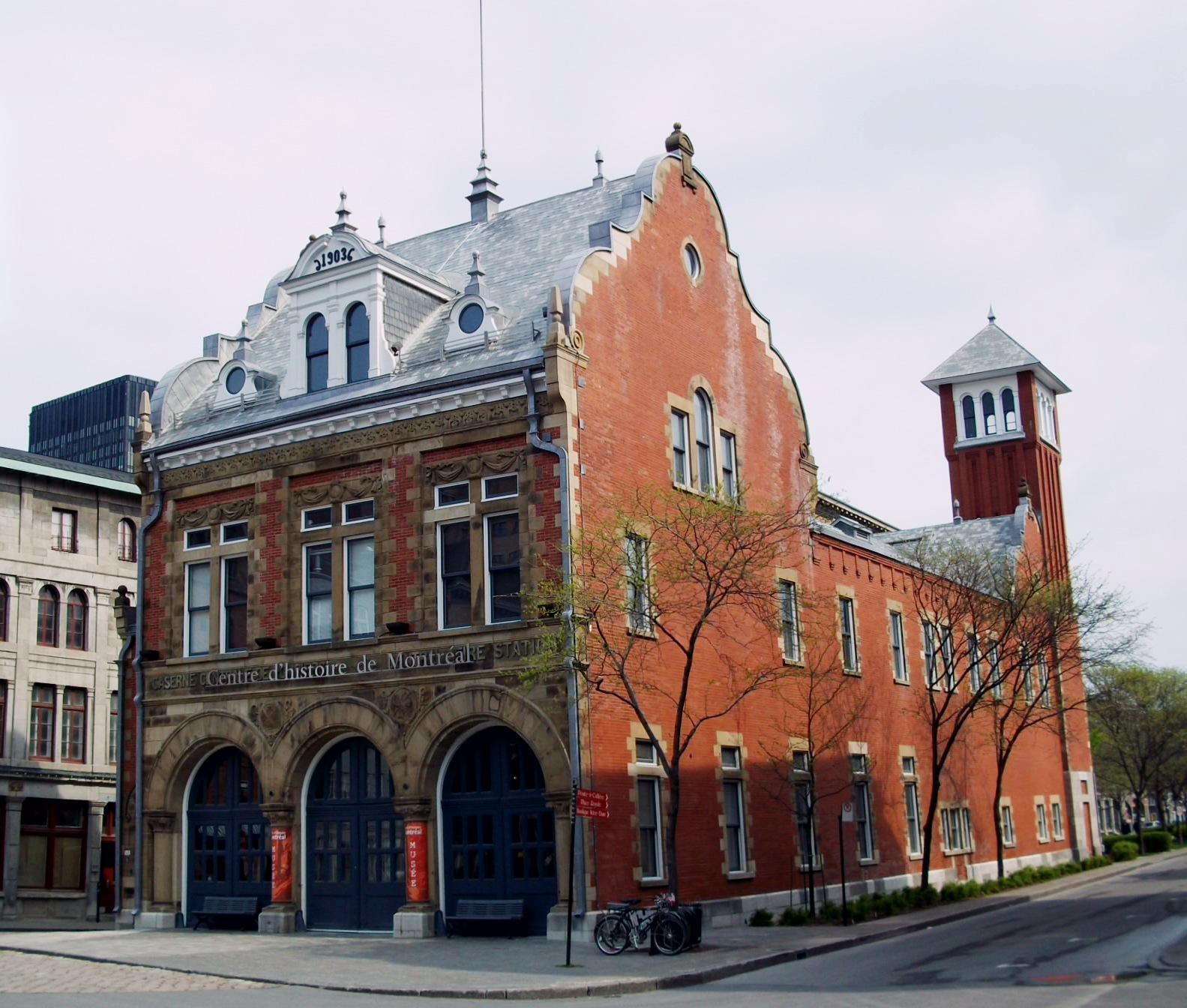
The Centre d'histoire de Montréal, incorporated into the former Central Fire Station.

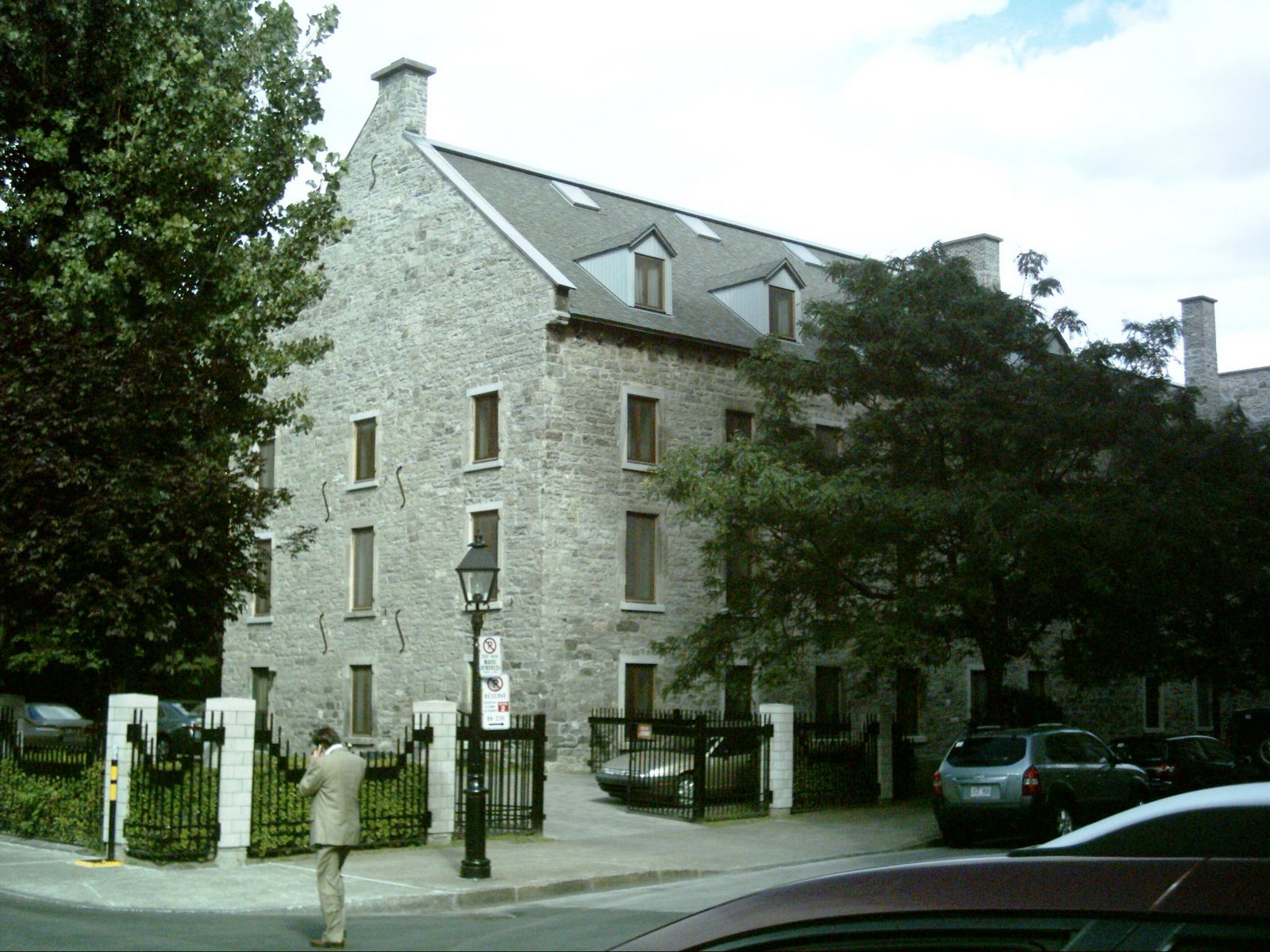
The Maison de Mère d'Youville (to the south of the Youville square), known locally as Hôpital général de Montréal (English: The Old Montreal General Hospital)

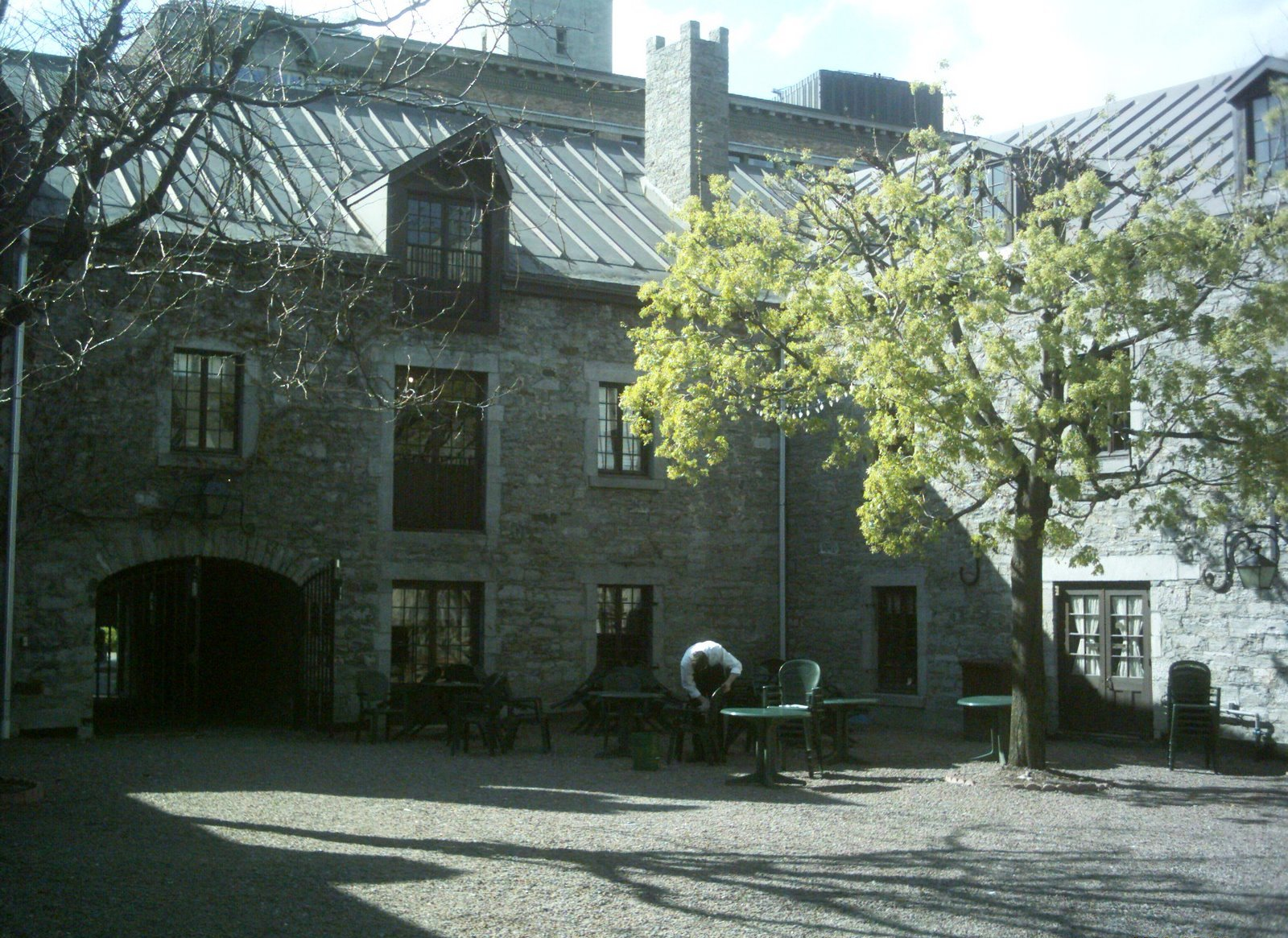
Inside the Écuries d'Youville, at number 300 Youville square

== Present-day layout ==
- The Pointe-à-Callière Museum.
- The area has been called since 2001 Place de la Grande-Paix-de-Montréal.
- In the centre, a former barracks is the premises for the Centre d'histoire de Montréal.
- A public work of art by Gilles Mihalcean called La Peur (Fear).
- Bello deli (363 place d'youville)
