= Burning of the Parliament Buildings in Montreal =

1849 riots against the Rebellion Losses Bill in Montreal, then-Province of Canada

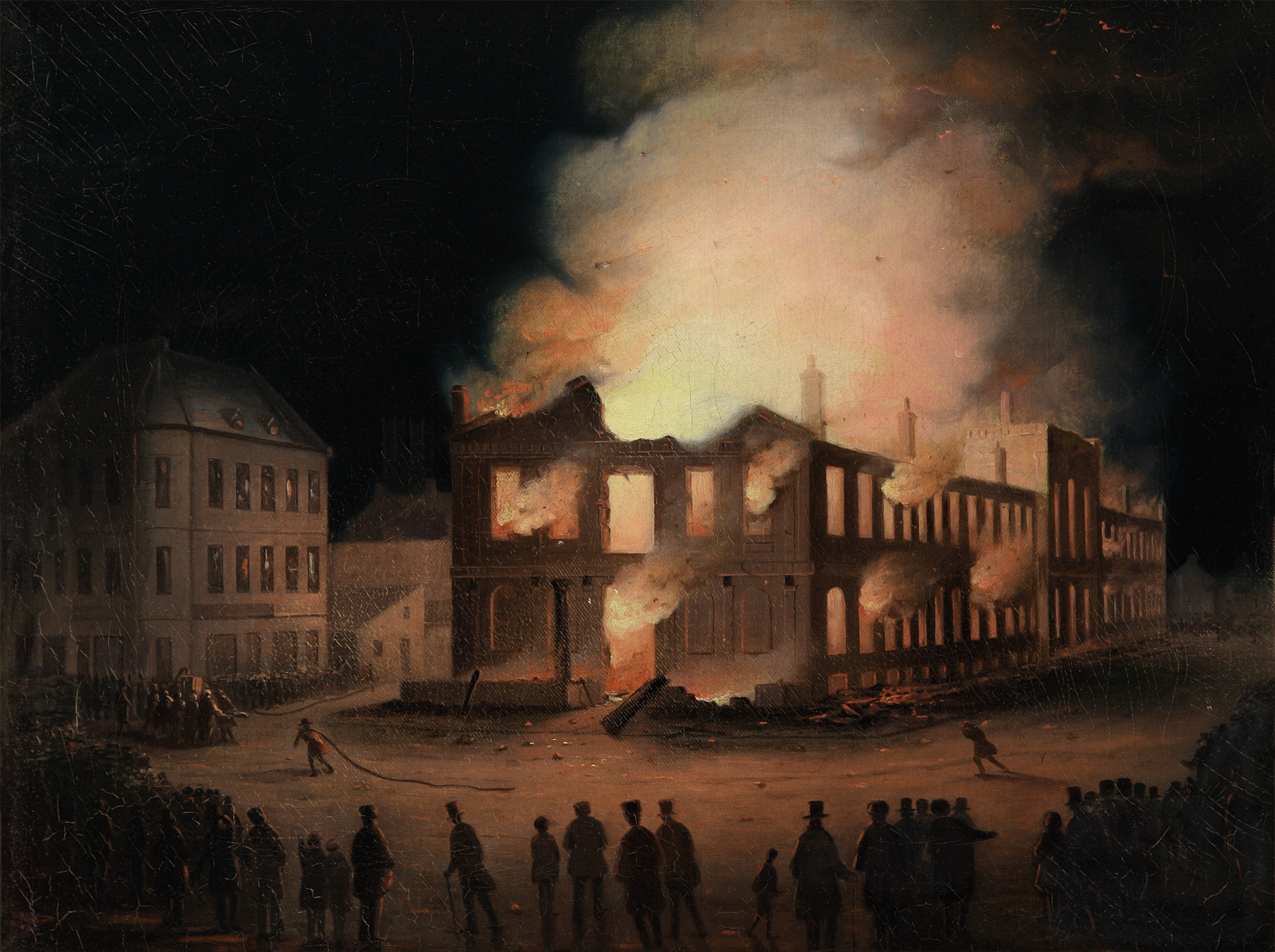
- Joseph Légaré, The Burning of the Parliament Building in Montreal, about 1849
- Location: 45°30′02″N 73°33′22″W; St. Anne's Market, Old Montreal
- Date: April 25, 1849
- Target: Parliament of the Province of Canada
- Attack type: Fire

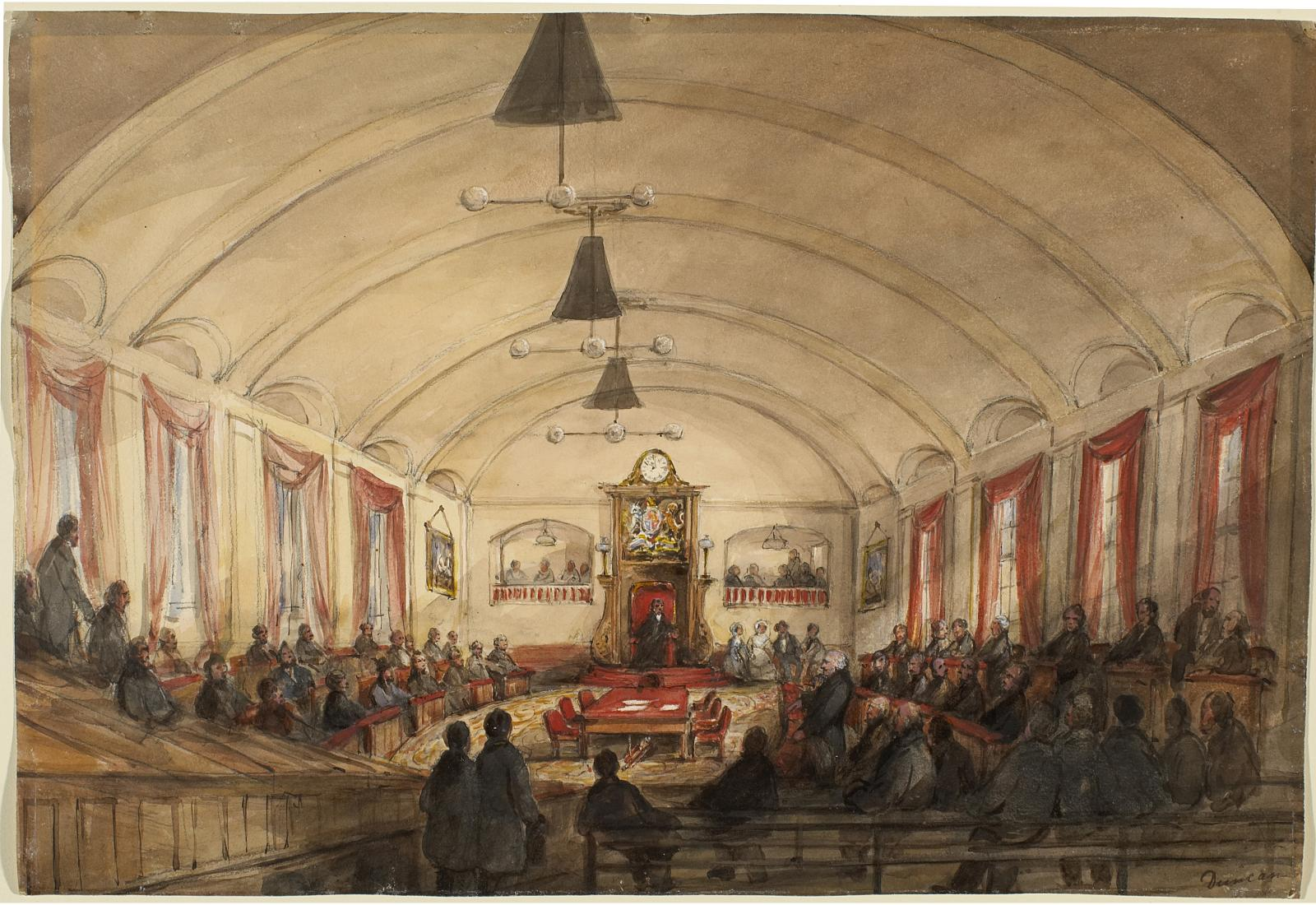
James Duncan, The House of Assembly, in the Parliament of Montreal, around 1848.

The burning of the Parliament Buildings in Montreal occurred on the night of April 25, 1849, in Montreal, the then-capital of the Province of Canada. The way the matter was handled by then co-prime ministers of the united Province of Canada, Sir Louis-Hippolyte Lafontaine and Robert Baldwin, helped develop the Canadian democratic tradition. It also caused the capital to be moved elsewhere, eventually being installed in Ottawa.

Tories protesting against the Rebellion Losses Bill burned down the St. Anne's Market building lodging the Legislative Council and Assembly of Canada while the members of the Legislative Assembly were sitting in session within. Similar protests, such as the Stony Monday riot, occurred in many places across British North America against the bill. The episode exemplified the divisions in pre-Confederation Canadian society concerning whether Canada was the North American appendage of the British Empire or a nascent sovereign nation where citizens could expect fair treatment.

In 1837 and 1838 Canada went into an economic depression caused partly by unusually bad weather and the banking crisis in the United States and Europe. Many citizens in Upper and Lower Canada (now the provinces of Ontario and Quebec respectively) demanded political changes and for the government to address the economic downturn. They rebelled, first in Lower Canada, then in Upper Canada. Lord Durham investigated and issued a sympathetic report, the government enacted political reforms that addressed some of the causes of the rebellions.

Many leaders of the Rebellions later played focal roles in the development of the political and philosophical foundations for an independent Canada, something achieved on July 1, 1867. The Rebellion Losses Bill was intended as amnesty to former rebels (permitting them to return to Canada) and indemnity to people financially hurt by the rebellions. Lord Durham had granted an amnesty to those involved in the first rebellion only. Despite an amendment stating that only those that had not pleaded guilty or been found guilty of high treason would receive compensation, the bill was decried by its opponents as amounting to "paying the rebels". The bill was eventually passed by the majority of those sitting in the Legislative Assembly, but it remained unpopular with much of the population of Canada East and West. Those in Montreal used violence to demonstrate their opposition. It is the only time in the history of the British Empire and Commonwealth that citizens burned down their Parliamentary Buildings in protest. The fire destroyed Parliament buildings and an important collection of historical records kept in the parliamentary library.

Despite the tense situation and the actions committed by the mob, Lafontaine proceeded cautiously, fought off armed rioters who had shot through his window, and maintained restraint and resolve in his actions. Jailed members of the mob were released on bail soon after their arrest. A force of special constables was established to keep the peace. Though there was public concern this might be a crushing blow to the reform movement, Lafontaine persevered despite the opposition, and continued to develop the tenets of Canadian federalism – "peace, order, and good government". Within a decade, public opinion had shifted overwhelmingly toward the development of a sovereign Canada.

== Background ==
=== Parliament moved to Montreal ===
The Province of Canada (or United Canada) was born out of the legislative union of the provinces of Upper Canada (Ontario) and Lower Canada (Quebec) in February 1841. In 1844, its capital was moved from Kingston, in Canada West (formerly Upper Canada), to Montreal, in Canada East (formerly Lower Canada). St. Anne's Market, located where Place d'Youville stands today, was renovated by architect John Ostell to host the provincial parliament. As part of the moving of the capital, all books in the two parliamentary libraries, as well as those of the Legislative Assembly and the Legislative Council were transported by boat on the St. Lawrence.

General elections were held in October 1844. The Tory party won a majority and Governor Metcalfe had its principal spokesmen enter the Executive Council. The first session of the second parliament opened on November 28 of the same year.

=== Economic crisis ===
In 1843, the Parliament of the United Kingdom passed the Canadian Corn Act, which favoured Canada's exports of wheat and flour on the UK markets through the reduction of duties. The protectionist policy of Lord Stanley and Benjamin Disraeli, in continuity with Great Britain's colonial practice during the first half of the 19th century, was overturned in 1846, by the repeal of the Corn Laws and the promotion of free trade by the government of Robert Peel.

Canada's chambers of commerce feared an imminent disaster. The Anti-Corn Law League was triumphant, but the commercial class and ruling class of Canada, principally English-speaking and conservative, experienced an important setback. The repercussions of the repeal were felt as early as 1847. The Canadian government put pressure on Colonial Secretary Earl Grey to have Great Britain negotiate a lowering of the duties imposed on Canadian products entering the United States market, which had become the only lucrative path to export. A reciprocity treaty was ultimately negotiated, but only eight years later in 1854. During the interval, Canada experienced an important political crisis and influential members of society openly discussed three alternatives to the political status quo: annexation to the United States, the federation of the colonies and territories of British North America, and the independence of Canada. Two citizens' associations appeared in the wake of the crisis: the Annexation Association and the British American League.

After 1847, the fears of the chambers of commerce in Canada were confirmed, and bankruptcies kept accumulating. Property values were in freefall in the cities, particularly in the capital. In February 1849, the introduction in Parliament of an indemnity bill only aggravated the discontent of a part of the population who had watched the passing of a series of legislative measures by the reformist majority, which took power in beginning of 1848, about a year before.

=== Rebellion Losses Bill ===
In 1845, the Draper-Viger government set up, on November 24, a commission of inquiry into the claims the inhabitants of Lower Canada had sent since 1838, to determine those that were justified and provide an estimate of the amount to be paid. The five commissioners, Joseph Dionne, P. H. Moore, Jacques Viger, John Simpson and Joseph-Ubalde Beaudry, submitted their first report in April 1846. They received instructions from the government to distinguish between claims made by persons participating in the rebellion and those who had given no support to the insurrectionist party. The total of the claims considered receivable amounted to £241,965, 10 s. and 5d., but the commissioners were of opinion that following a more thorough enquiry into the claims they were unable to make, the amount to be paid by the government would likely not go beyond £100,000. The Assembly passed a motion on June 9, 1846 authorizing a compensation of £9,986 for claims studied prior to the presentation of the report. Nothing further was accomplished on this question until the dissolution of parliament on December 6, 1847.

The general election of January 1848 changed the composition of the House of Assembly in favour of the opposition party, the moderate reformists led by Robert Baldwin and Louis-Hippolyte Lafontaine. The new governor, Lord Elgin, who arrived in the colony on January 30, first formed a government that did not have the support of the majority of the members in the House. These withdrew their support of the Executive by a vote of no-confidence on March 3. On March 7, Governor Elgin called in Baldwin and Lafontaine, respectively leaders of the majority parties in both sections of the united province, to the Executive Council. On March 11, eleven new ministers (Note: For Canada West: Robert Baldwin (co-premier and attorney general), Francis Hincks (inspector general), Malcolm Cameron (assistant commissioner of public works), Robert Baldwin Sullivan (provincial secretary), James Hervey Price (commissioner of crown lands), William Hume Blake (solicitor general) For Canada East: James Leslie (president of the Executive Council), Thomas Cushing Aylwin (Solicitor General), Louis-Hippolyte Lafontaine (co-premier and attorney general), René-Édouard Caron (president of the Legislative Council), Louis-Michel Viger (receiver general) et Étienne-Paschal Taché (commissioner of public works) Leacock (1907), p. 283) entered the council.

On January 29, 1849, Lafontaine moved to form a committee of the whole House on February 9 to "take into consideration the necessity of establishing the amount of Losses incurred by certain inhabitants in Lower Canada during the political troubles of 1837 and 1838, and of providing for the payment thereof". The consideration of this motion was pushed ahead on several occasions. The opposition party, which denounced the desire of the government to "pay the rebels", showed itself reluctant to begin the study of the question which was on hold since 1838. Its members proposed various amendments to Lafontaine's motion: a first, on February 13, to report the vote by ten days "to give time for the expression of the feelings of the country"; a second one, on February 20, declaring that the House had "no authority to entertain any such proposition" since the Governor General had not recommended that the House "make provision for liquidating the claims for Losses incurred by the Rebellions in Lower Canada, during the present session". The amendments were rejected and the committee was eventually formed on Tuesday, February 20, but the House was adjourned.

The debates that took place between February 13 and 20 were particularly intense and, in the House, the verbal violence of the representatives soon yielded to physical violence. Tory MPPs Henry Sherwood, Allan MacNab and Prince attacked the legitimacy of the proposed measure, stating that it rewarded the "rebels" of yesterday and constituted an insult to the "loyal" subjects who had fought against them in 1837 and 1838. On February 15, executive councillors Francis Hincks and William Hume Blake retorted in the same tone and Blake even went as far as claiming the Tories to be the true rebels, because, he said, it was they who had violated the principles of the British constitution and caused the civil war of 1837–38. Mr. Blake refused to apologize after his speech, and a mêlée burst out among the spectators standing on the galleries. The speaker of the House had them expelled and a confrontation between MacNab and Blake was avoided by the intervention of the Sergeant at Arms.

The English-language press of the capital (The Gazette, Courier, Herald, Transcript, Witness, Punch) participated in the movement of opposition to the indemnification measure. A single daily, the Pilot, owned by cabinet member Francis Hinks, supported the government. In the French-language press (La Minerve, L'Avenir), the measure was unanimously supported.

On February 17, the leading Tory MPPs held a public meeting to protest against the measure. George Moffatt was elected chairman and various public men such as Allan MacNab, Prince, Gugy, Macdonald, Molson, Rose and others gave speeches. The meeting prepared a petition to the governor asking him to dissolve the parliament and call new elections, or to reserve the assent of the bill for the Queen's pleasure, that is to say, to defer the question to the UK Parliament. The press reported that Lafontaine was burned in effigy that night.

On February 22, Henry John Boulton, MPP for Norfolk, introduced an amendment that all persons having pleaded guilty or having been found to be guilty of high treason should not receive compensation from the government. The government party supported the amendment, but the gesture had no effect on the opposition, which persisted in denouncing the measure as amounting to "paying the rebels". Certain liberal MPPs, including Louis-Joseph Papineau and Pierre-Joseph-Olivier Chauveau, opposed the amendment because, according to them, it resulted in the recognition, by the government, of the legality of the military court created by former acting governor John Colborne in order to speedily execute the prisoners of 1839.

On March 9, the Legislative Assembly passed the bill by a vote of 47 to 18. MPPs from the former Upper Canada voted in favour, 17 to 14, while those of the former Lower Canada voted 30 to 4 in favour. Six days later, the Legislative Council approved the project 20 to 14. The project having passed both Houses of the Provincial Parliament, the next step was the assent of Governor Elgin, which came 41 days later, on April 25, 1849.

On March 22, a crowd paraded in the streets of Toronto with effigies of William Lyon Mackenzie, Robert Baldwin, and William Hume Blake. When the group neared Baldwin's residence, and in front of that of a Mr. McIntosh on Yonge Street, where Mackenzie was residing after his return from exile, they set the effigies on fire and threw rocks through the windows of Mr. McIntosh's house.<

== Mob attacked parliament ==
On April 25, the cabinet sent Francis Hinks to The Monklands, the governor's residence, to request that Governor Elgin quickly come to town in order to assent a new tariff bill. The first European ship of the year had already arrived in the Port of Quebec and the new law needed to be in force in order to tax its merchandise. The governor left his residence and went to the Parliament the same day.

At about 5:00 pm, the governor gave the royal assent to the bill in the Legislative Council room, in the presence of members of both houses of Parliament. Since he was already in town, the governor decided to also give assent to some forty one other bills passed by the houses and awaiting to be assented. Among those bills was the Rebellion Losses Bill. The assent of this law seemed to take some people by surprise, and the galleries where some visitors were standing became agitated.

When the governor exited the building at around 6:00 pm, he found a crowd of protesters blocking his path. Some of the protesters began throwing eggs and rocks at him and his aides and he was forced to climb back into his carriage in haste and return to Monklands at gallop speed, while some of his assailants pursued him in the streets.

Not long after the attacks on the governor, alarm bells sounded throughout town to alert the population. A horse-drawn carriage traveled through the streets to announce a public meeting to denounce the governor's assent to the Rebellion Losses Bill. The editor in chief of The Gazette, James Moir Ferres, published an Extra which contained a report of the incident involving Lord Elgin, and invited the "Anglo-Saxons" of Montreal to attend a mass meeting to be held at 8:00 pm on Place d'Armes. The Extra read:

When Lord Elgin – he no longer deserves the name of Excellency – made his appearance on the street to retire from the Council Chamber, he was received by the crowd with hisses, hootings, and groans. He was pelted with rotten eggs; he and his aide-de-camps were splashed with the savory liquor; and the whole carriage covered with the nasty contents of the eggs and with mud. When the eggs were exhausted stones were made use of to salute the departing carriage, and he was driven off at a rapid gallop amidst the hootings and curses of his countrymen.

The End has begun.

Anglo-Saxons! you must live for the future. Your blood and race will now be supreme, if true to yourselves. You will be English "at the expense of not being British." To whom and what, is your allegiance now? Answer each man for himself.

The puppet in the pageant must be recalled, or driven away by the universal contempt of the people.

In the language of William the Fourth, "Canada is lost, and given away."

A Mass Meeting will be held on the Place d'Armes this evening at 8 o'clock. Anglo-Saxons to the struggle, now is your time. — Montreal Gazette, "Extra" of April 25, 1849.

Between 1,200 and 1,500 were reported to have attended the meeting (which in the end took place on Champ-de-Mars) to hear, by the gleam of torch light, the speeches of orators protesting vigorously against Lord Elgin's assent to the bill. Among the speakers were George Moffat, Colonel Gugy and other members of the official opposition. During the meeting it was proposed to address a petition to Her Majesty asking her to recall governor Elgin and disavow the indemnification act. In the 1887 account he gave of his participation to the events, some 38 years later, Alfred Perry, the captain of a volunteer corps of firemen, asserted that on that night he stepped on the hustings to speak to the crowd, put his hat on the torch lighting the petition, and exclaimed: "The time for petitions is over, but if the men who are present here are serious, let them follow me to the Parliament Buildings."

The crowd then followed him to the Parliament Buildings. Along the way, they broke the windows of the offices of the Montreal Pilot, which was the only English-language daily supporting the administration at that time.

When they arrived on site, the rioters broke the windows of the House of Assembly, which was still in session despite the late hour. A committee of the whole House was at that time debating a Bill to Establish a Court having jurisdiction in Appeals and Criminal matters for Lower Canada. The last entry in the journal of the House on April 25 reads:

Mr. Johnson took the Chair of the Committee; and after some time spent therein, the proceedings of the Committee were interrupted by continued volleys of stones and other missiles thrown from the streets, through the windows, into the Legislative Assembly Hall, which caused the Committee to rise, and the Members to withdraw into the adjoining passages for safety, — from whence Mr. Speaker and the other Members were almost immediately compelled to retire and leave the Building, which had been set fire to on the outside. — Journals of the Legislative Assembly of the Province of Canada, April 25, 1849.

After breaking the windows and the gas lamps on the outside, a group entered the building and committed various acts of vandalism. According to Perry's account, he, together with Augustus Howard and Alexander Courtney, broke into the building after a first unsuccessful attempt to open the locked doors. Someone ordered a fire truck brought over, and then Perry and a notary, John H. Isaacson, used the truck's 35 ft (11 m) ladder as a battering ram to break down the doors. He entered with a few followers and reached the House of Assembly. A certain O'Connor attempted to block their entry, but Perry knocked him down with the handle of the axe he was carrying. The mob took control of the room despite the resistance of a few MPPs (John Sandfield Macdonald, William Hume Blake, John Price) and sergeant at arms Chrisholm.

One of the rioters sat in the Speaker's chair where Morin had been sitting only a few minutes before, and declared the dissolution of the House. The room was turned upside down while other men entered the room of the Legislative Council. The acts of vandalism that were reported included the destruction of the seats and desks, stamping on the portrait of Louis-Joseph Papineau, that had been hanging on the wall next to that of Queen Victoria. Perry claimed to have accidentally set fire to the room himself when he hit the gas chandelier suspended on the ceiling with a brick, aiming for the clock that was directly above the Speaker's chair. The clock, whose ticking apparently got on his nerves, was, according to his account, showing 9:40 pm when it happened. Other sources, including newspapers of the time, believed the fire to have been started when rioters outside the building started throwing the torches that some of them had carried from the Champ-de-Mars meeting.

Since gas pipes were broken both inside and outside the building, the fire spread rapidly. Perry and Courtney ran out of the building with the ceremonial mace of the House of Assembly which was lying on the clerk's desk in front of the Speaker's chair. The mace was then brought to Allan MacNab at Donegana Hotel. (Note: When the reformists took power, Morin replaced MacNab as Speaker because the later did not hear and speak both English and French.)

The St. Anne's Market building burned very rapidly, with the fire propagating to adjacent buildings, including a house, some warehouses, and the general hospital of the Grey Nuns. The mob did not allow firefighters to fight the flames devastating the parliament buildings, but did not intervene against those who were trying to save the other structures.

== Damages ==
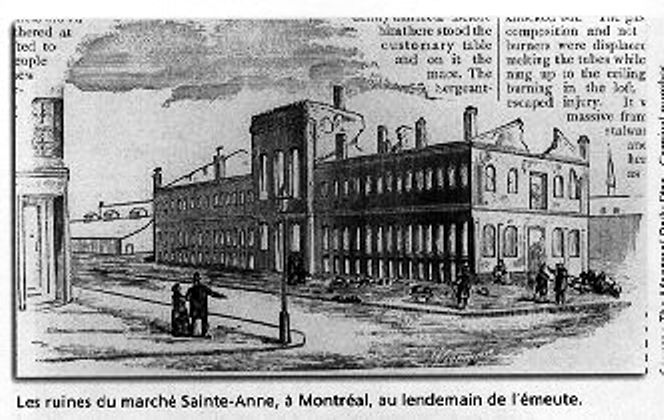
Montreal Daily Star, January–February 1887, Carnival Issue

The St. Anne's Market building was completely devastated. The fire consumed the parliament's two libraries, parts of the archives of Upper Canada and Lower Canada, as well as more recent public documents. Over 23,000 volumes, forming the collections of the two parliamentary libraries, were lost. Only about 200 books, along with the portrait of Queen Victoria, were saved, thanks to James Curran. Four people, Colonel Wiley, a Scotsman named McGillivray, an employee of the parliament, and the uncle of Todd, who was responsible for the libraries, and Sandford Fleming, who later became a renowned engineer, saved the portrait of Queen Victoria hanging in the hall leading to the lower house. The canvas of the painting without the frame was transported to the Donegana Hotel. The market buildings and all it contained were insured for £12,000; the insurers refused to pay because of the criminal origin of the fire.

The two libraries and the public archives had been kept in the Parliament buildings since 1845. At the beginning of the session of 1849, the library of the Legislative Assembly counted more than 14,000 volumes and that of the Legislative Council more than 8,000. The collections were those of the libraries of the old provincial parliaments of Lower Canada and Upper Canada, which were merged into a single parliament through the Act of Union in 1840. The parliament house of the province of Upper Canada, founded in 1791 and seated in York, had been burned down by the American army during the War of 1812. The parliament remained itinerant between 1814 and 1829, and a permanent building did not re-open before 1832. Consequently, its libraries were not considerable and only provided a few hundreds of books to the new united legislature. Most of the books came from the Parliament of Lower Canada's libraries, particularly that of the Legislative Assembly, which comprised many thousands of books and was opened to the public in 1825. The losses were estimated at over $400,000.

Looking to rebuild the parliamentary library, the government sent bibliographer Georges-Barthélemi Faribault to Europe, where he spent £4,400 purchasing volumes in Paris and London. Two years after its partial reconstruction in new parliament buildings in Quebec City, fire again destroyed the library of the Parliament of United Canada, on February 1, 1854. This time, the flames destroyed half the 17,000 volumes of the library, which had been in the new Parliament Buildings of Quebec City since 1853.

== Effects of the fire on the parliament ==
The parliamentary agenda was obviously affected by the events of April 25. The day after the fire, a special meeting of the members of the Legislative Assembly was convened to meet at 10:00 am in the hall of the Bonsecours Market, under the protection of British soldiers. (Note: A new St. Anne's Market building, designed by architect George Browne, was built on the same site as the old one in 1851.) On that day, the MPPs accomplished nothing other than appointing a committee responsible to report on the bills that were destroyed. Their report was presented to the House a week later on May 2. Lafontaine was not present that morning, because he attended the wedding of lawyer Joseph-Amable Berthelot, his associate in legal practice, who was marrying the adoptive daughter of judge Elzéar Bédard. The Legislative Assembly kept meeting at Bonsecours Market until May 7, after which date the parliament was convened in a building owned by Moses Judas Hayes on Place Dalhousie.

The Legislative Council's first meeting after the fire was held in the sacristy of the Trinity Church on April 30.

== First series of arrests ==
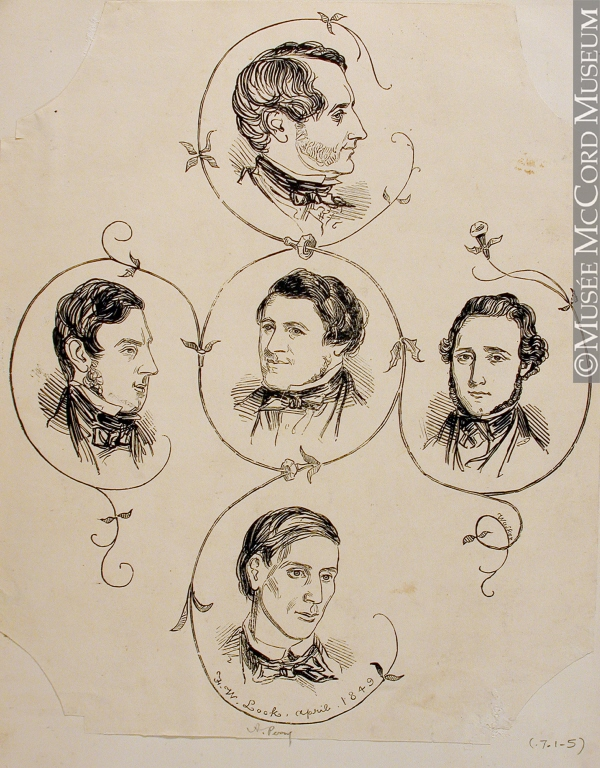
The five gentlemen portrayed are: J. M. Ferres, Editor; H. E. Montgomerie, Merchant; W. G. Mack, Barrister; Augustus Heward, Broker; Alfred Perry, Tradesman. By Frederick William Lock, engraved by John Henry Walker; a Punch in Canada Extra.

Four of the speakers of the Champs-de-Mars meeting, James Moir Ferres, editor in chief and principal owner of The Montreal Gazette, William Gordon Mack, lawyer and secretary of the British American League, Hugh E. Montgomerie, trader, Augustus Heward, trader and courtier, as well as Alfred Perry, five persons in total, were arrested and charged with arson early in the morning of April 26 by the police superintendent William Ermatinger. A crowd gathered around the police station at the Bonsecours Market in protest. Perry, who was arrested last, was transferred to the prison of the faubourg de Québec at 12:00 pm, escorted by a company of soldiers, and pursued by the crowd. Once in prison, he was put in the same cell with the other four.

Lafontaine, exercising his role as Attorney General, advised Ermatinger to release the prisoners. On April 28, they were released on bail. A procession of omnibuses and cabs transported them in triumph from the prison to the front door of the Bank of Montreal, on Place d'Armes, where they addressed their partisans and thanked them for their support.

== Continuation of violence until May ==
On the night of April 26, a group of men vandalized the residences of reformist MPPs Hinks, Wilson and Benjamin Holmes at Beaver Hall. The men then went to the house of Louis-Hippolyte Lafontaine, on rue de l'Aqueduc in the faubourg Saint-Antoine, vandalizing it and setting his stable on fire. The fire spread to his house while no one was inside. It was extinguished by a detachment of soldiers, but not before it had caused significant damage to Lafontaine's private library. Returning toward downtown Montreal, the men broke windows on the boarding house where Baldwin and Price resided as well as those of McNamee's Inn, two buildings forming the corner of the Catholic Cemetery street. They also attacked the residences of Solicitor General Mr. Drummond on Craig street and that of Dr. Wolfred Nelson, at the corner of Saint-Laurent and Petite Saint-Jacques.

A group of Tory leaders including George Moffatt and Gugy convened a new public meeting of the "Friends of Peace" on Champ-de-Mars on Friday April 27 at 12:00 pm. There they tried to calm their followers down and proposed the resumption of peaceable means to resolve the crisis. It was resolved to submit a petition praying the Queen to relieve Elgin from office and disavow the Rebellion Losses Act.

Confronted with riots threatening the lives of citizens and damaging their properties, the government took the decision to raise a special police force. On the morning of April 27, the authorities informed the population that men who would show up at 6:00 pm in front of the dépôt de l'ordonnance on rue du Bord-de-l'Eau would receive arms. Some 800 men, principally Canadians from Montreal and its suburbs and some Irish immigrants of Griffintown, presented themselves and between 500 and 600 constables were armed and barracked near the Bonsecours Market. During the arms distribution, a group of men showed up and attacked the new constables by firing on them and throwing rocks at them. The newly armed men fought back and wounded three of their assailants.

During a public meeting on Place du Castor on that night, general Charles Stephen Gore stepped on the hustings and dispersed the crowd by swearing on his honour that the new constables would be disarmed by morning. This is indeed what occurred, as the new force supposed to act under the orders of Montreal's justices of the peace was demobilized less than 24 hours after being armed.

A part of the 71st (Highland) Regiment of Foot equipped with two cannons was mobilized to repel a group of armed men marching toward the Bonsecours Market. The soldiers blocked rue Notre-Dame near the Jacques Cartier Market. Colonel Gugy intervened and dissuaded the rioters from attacking the Bonsecours Market.

On Saturday April 28, the representatives present at the Bonsecours Market appointed a special committee to prepare an address to the governor by which the Legislative Assembly deplored the acts of violence of the past three days, especially the burning of the Parliament Buildings, and gave its full support to the governor to enforce the law and restore public peace. The representatives voted for the address 36 to 16.

While not necessarily supportive of the acts of violence shaking the town of Montreal, the conservative circles of British Canada publicly expressed their contempt for the representative of the Crown. The members of the Thistle Society met and voted to strike Governor Elgin's name from the list of benefactors. On April 28, the Saint Andrew's Society also struck him from its list of members.

On Sunday April 29, the day of the Christian Sabbath, the town of Montreal was at rest and no incidents were reported.

On Monday April 30, the governor and his dragoon escort left his suburban residence of Monklands for the Government House, then lodging in the Château Ramezay on rue Notre-Dame in downtown Montreal, to publicly receive, at 3:00 pm, the address of the House of Assembly voted on the 28th. When the governor entered rue Notre-Dame toward 14:30 pm, a crowd of protesters threw rocks and eggs and other projectiles against his carriage and the armed escort protecting him. He was hooted at by some, applauded by others along the way. The representatives, also protected by an armed escort, arrived at the meeting with the governor in the Bonsecours Market by way of the ruelle Saint-Claude.

After the ceremony for the presentation of the address, the governor and his escort returned to Monklands by taking rue S^{t}-Denis in order to avoid conflict with the crowd still demonstrating against his presence. The stratagem did not work and the governor and his guards were intercepted at the corner of Saint-Laurent and Sherbrooke by rioters who again pelted them with rocks. The brother of the governor, colonel Bruce, was seriously injured by a rock that hit his head; Ermatinger and captain Jones were also injured.

On that day, Elgin wrote to Colonial Secretary Earl Grey to suggest that if he [Elgin] failed "to recover that position of dignified neutrality between contending parties" that he had strived to maintain, that it might be in the interest of the metropolitan government to replace him with someone who would not be personally obnoxious to an important part of Canada's population. Earl Grey, to the contrary, believed that his replacement would be harmful and would have the effect of encouraging those who violently and illegally opposed the authority of his government, which continued to receive the full support of the Westminster cabinet.

On May 10, a delegation of citizens from Toronto, who had come to Montreal to deliver an address in support of the Earl of Elgin, were attacked while in the Hôtel Têtu.

== Case before Westminster ==
The Tories sent Allan MacNab and Cayley to London in early May to bring their petitions to the Imperial Parliament and lobby their case with the Colonial Office. The government party delegated Francis Hinks, who left Montreal on May 14, to represent the point of view of the governor, his Executive Council, and the majority of the members in both Houses of Parliament.

The former colonial secretary, William Ewart Gladstone, then of the Tory Party, sided with the Canadian opposition and exercised all his influence in its favour. On June 14, John Charles Herries, a Tory member of the House of Commons for Stamford, presented a motion to disavow the Rebellion Losses Act assented by the Earl of Elgin on April 25. But the governor of British North America received the support of both John Russell, the Whig Prime Minister as well as the Tory leader of the opposition Robert Peel. On June 16, the House of Commons rejected Herries' motion by a majority of 141 votes.

On June 19, Lord Brougham introduced a motion in the House of Lords to suspend the Rebellion Losses Act until it was amended to insure that no person who participated to the rebellion against the established government would be compensated. The motion was defeated 99 to 96.

== Second series of arrests ==
On the morning of August 15, John Orr, Robert Cooke, John Nier, Jr., John Ewing, and Alexander Courtney were charged with arson and arrested by justices McCord, Wetherall, and Ermatinger. All were released on bail except for Courtney. The transfer of the accused from the Court House to the prison was a repeat of Perry's transfer on April 26. A crowd, determined to deliver up Courtney, attacked the military escort protecting his car but were pushed back at the points of bayonets.

A gathering formed at dusk (after 8:00 pm) in front of the Orr Hotel on rue Notre-Dame. Men endeavoured to raise barricades of three to four feet in height using the paving stones of the Saint-Gabriel and Notre-Dame Streets. The authorities were informed of what was going on and a detachment of the 23rd Regiment of Foot (Royal Welsh Fusiliers) was sent to undo the work before the barricades could be armed. Some of the men who ran off when the army showed up regrouped and decided to attack the house of Lafontaine and the boarding house where Baldwin was residing.

At around 10:00 pm, some 200 men attacked the residence of Lafontaine, who was at home and without a guard. It was around 5:00 pm when he learned of a rumour circulating in town saying that his house was going to be attacked. At around 6 or 7:00 pm, he sent a note to captain Wetherall to tell him about the rumour. Around the same time, some friends who had heard the rumour arrived on their own to help him defend his life and his property. Among them were Étienne-Paschal Taché, C.-J. Coursol, Joseph-Ubalde Beaudry, Moïse Brossard, and Harkin. Guns were fired on both sides. The attackers retreated with seven wounded, including William Mason, the son of a blacksmith living on Craig Street, who died of his wounds the following morning. The cavalry commanded by Captain Sweeney, which Wetherall had sent to protect Lafontaine, arrived later and missed all of the action.

The Tory press gave great coverage of the death of Mason, and, on August 18, a grand funeral procession marched on Craig, Bonsecours, and Saint-Paul Streets, as well as on Place Jacques-Cartier, before going toward the English cemetery.

An enquiry of the circumstances of Mason's death was opened by coroners Jones and Coursol. Lafontaine was called in to testify before the jury in the Cyrus Hotel on Place Jacques Cartier on August 20 at 10:00 am. While the co-premier was inside the hotel, some men spread oil in the front staircase and set it on fire. The building was evacuated, and Lafontaine exited under the protection of the military guards.

== Capital moves to Toronto ==
On May 19, Henry Sherwood, one of the members for Toronto, proposed to move the capital alternatively to Toronto and Quebec City, for periods of not more than four years at each city. After a debate in which other cities were thrown in, Sherwood's proposal was approved 34 to 29. On May 30, the deputy governor, General William Rowan, acting in place of Governor Elgin who no longer wanted to leave Monklands, prorogued Parliament, initially until July 5 in Montreal. The Governor then prorogued Parliament from time to time until calling it back into session on May 14, 1850, but this time in Toronto. The Governor had announced the change in location by a proclamation on November 14, 1849.

Unlike Montreal, Toronto was a homogeneous town at the linguistic level; English was the common language of all main ethnic and religious groups inhabiting it. By comparison, the Montreal of the time of governor Metcalfe (1843–45) counted 27,908 Canadians, (Note: 19,045 French Canadians, almost all Catholic, and 8,863 British Canadians, in majority Protestants.) the majority French-speaking, and 15,668 immigrants from the British Isles. (Note: 3,161 from England, 2,712 from Scotland, 9,795 from Ireland.) The statistics were similar when looking at the whole county of Montreal. In 1857 Queen Victoria chose Ottawa as the new and current capital.

== Archaeological investigations ==
Since 2011, there have been ongoing archaeological investigations into the site of the Parliament building. Remains of the building have been found, as well as relics, such as books from the library that survived the fire, and dinnerware from the parliamentary restaurant.

== See also ==
- List of incidents of civil unrest in Canada
