= Legislative Assembly of Lower Canada =

Lower house of the provincial government in Lower Canada

Legislative Assembly of Lower Canada Chambre d'assemblée du Bas-Canada

Type
- Type: Lower house of the Parliament of Lower Canada

History
- Founded: 1791
- Disbanded: 1838
- Preceded by: Council for Affairs of the Province of Quebec (c. 1774)
- Succeeded by: Legislative Assembly of the Province of Canada (following the temporary Special Council of Lower Canada)

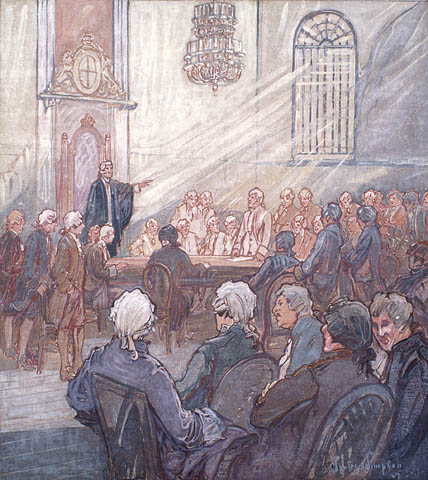
The Legislative Assembly of Lower Canada, in the Chapel of Bishop's Palace, Quebec City

The Legislative Assembly of Lower Canada was the lower house of the bicameral structure of provincial government in Lower Canada until 1838. The legislative assembly was created by the Constitutional Act of 1791. The lower house consisted of elected legislative councilors who created bills to be passed up to the Legislative Council of Lower Canada, whose members were appointed by the governor general.

Following the Lower Canada Rebellion, the lower house was dissolved on March 27, 1838, and Lower Canada was administered by an appointed Special Council. With the Act of Union in 1840, a new lower chamber, the Legislative Assembly of Canada, was created for both Upper and Lower Canada which existed until 1867, when the Legislative Assembly of Quebec was created.

== Speaker of the House of Assembly of Lower Canada ==
- Jean-Antoine Panet 1792–1794
- Michel-Eustache-Gaspard-Alain Chartier de Lotbinière 1794–1796
- Jean-Antoine Panet 1797-1814
- Louis-Joseph Papineau 1815–1822
- Joseph-Remi Vallieres de Saint-Real 1823–1825
- Louis-Joseph Papineau 1825–1841

== Electoral Districts ==
=== From 1792 to 1829 ===
50 members elected in 23 two-seat districts and four single-seat districts.

Electoral District	# of Members	Status after electoral changes in 1829
Bedford	1	Renamed as Rouville.
Buckingham	2	Drummond, Missisquoi, Shefford, Sherbrooke and Stanstead split off from Buckingham during elections in 1829. In 1830 what was left of Buckingham was split into Lotbinière, Nicolet et Yamaska.
Cornwallis	2	Divided into Kamouraska and Rimouski.
Devon	2	Renamed as L'Islet.
Dorchester	2	Beauce was split from Dorchester.
Effingham	2	Renamed as Terrebonne.
Gaspé	1	Bonaventure was separated from Gaspé.
Hampshire	2	Renamed as Portneuf.
Hertford	2	Renamed as Bellechasse.
Huntingdon	2	Divided into Beauharnois, L'Acadie and Laprairie.
Kent	2	Renamed as Chambly.
Leinster	2	Divided into Lachenaie and L'Assomption.
Comté de Montréal	2	No changes
Montréal-Est	2	No changes
Montréal-Ouest	2	No changes
Northumberland	2	Divided into Montmorency and Saguenay.
Orléans	1	No changes
Comté de Québec	2	No changes
Basse-ville de Québec	2	No changes
Haute-ville de Québec	2	No changes
Richelieu	2	Saint-Hyacinthe split from Richelieu.
Saint-Maurice	2	Champlain split from Saint-Maurice.
Surrey	2	Renamed as Verchères.
Trois-Rivières	2	No changes
Warwick	2	Renamed as Berthier.
William-Henry	1	No changes
York	2	Divided into Deux-Montagnes, Ottawa and Vaudreuil.

== Buildings ==
See Old Parliament Building (Quebec)

== See also ==
- Executive Council of Lower Canada
- Constitutional history of Canada
