= Centre d'histoire de Montréal =

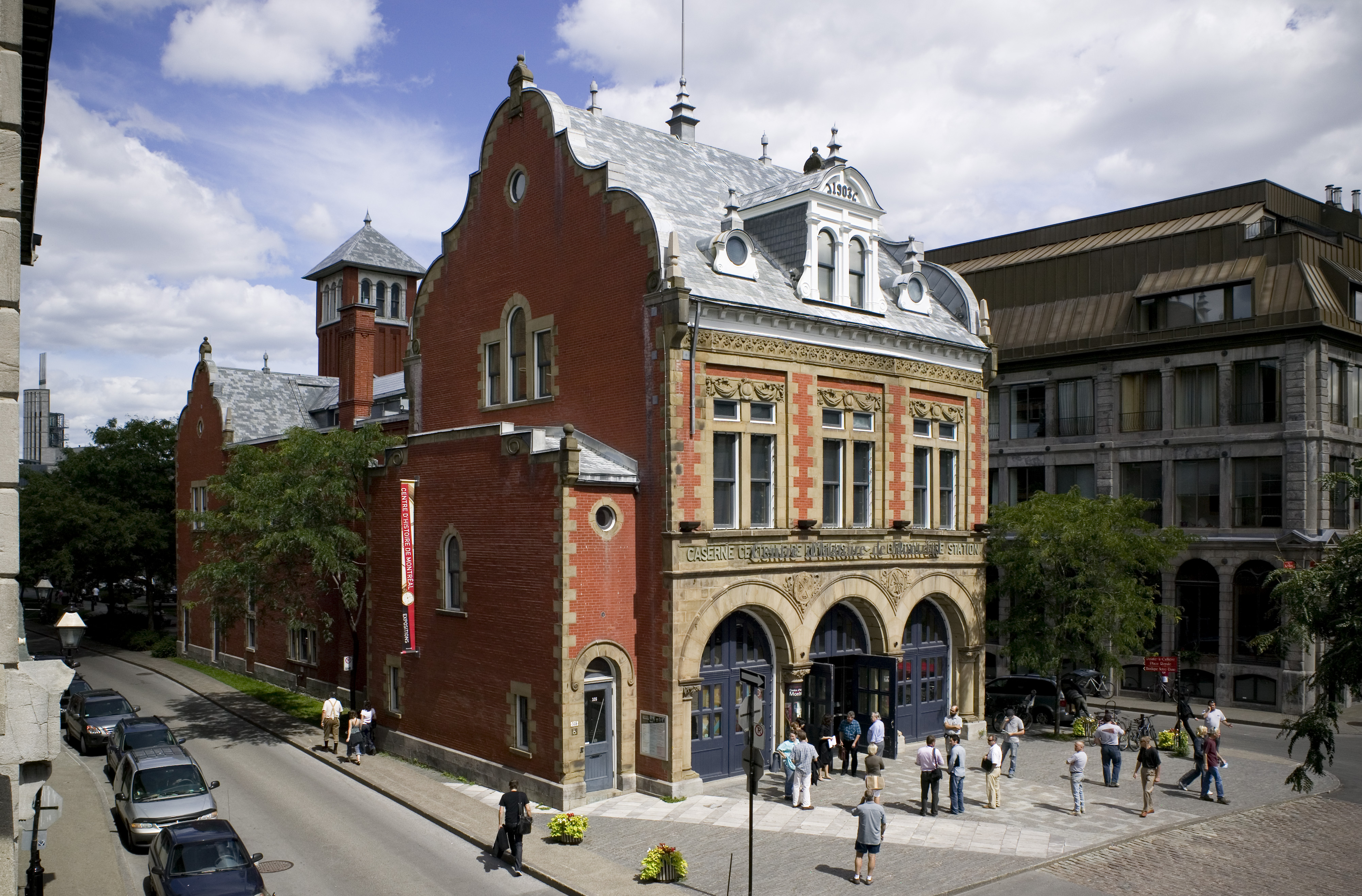
- The exterior of the Centre d'histoire de Montréal

- Location of the museum in Montreal
- Established: 1983
- Location: 335, place d'Youville; Montreal, Quebec; H2Y 3T1
- Coordinates: 45.501111°N 73.555556°W
- Type: History museum
- Visitors: 60,258 (2011)
- Curator: Jean-François Leclerc
- Website: ville.montreal.qc.ca/chm

The Centre d'histoire de Montréal is a museum in Montreal, Quebec, Canada. It is located at 335 Place d'Youville in Old Montreal, in the borough of Ville-Marie. The museum is dedicated to the history of Montreal.

== History ==
The centre is housed in a former central fire station, built on Place d'Youville from 1903 to 1904. Its architects, Joseph Perrault and Simon Lesage, were inspired by several architectural styles to give it a Flemish character, which was unique in Montreal at the time. Its facade consists of buff sandstone, red brick, a mansard roof with skylight, and a square tower crowned with a hip roof. It opened in 1904 as Montreal's Central Fire Station, and had both horses and steam pumps. In 1908, the station became a mere neighborhood station and the horses were replaced by motor vehicles 1931. The fire station closed in 1972.

In the 1970s, the City of Montreal and the Quebec Ministry of Cultural Affairs signed an agreement on cultural development for the rehabilitation of the historic district. It had several components: archaeological excavations, and revitalizing the western district after the abandonment of nearby industrial areas. In order to ensure a museum function in the building, the agreement also resulted in the establishment of the Centre d'histoire de Montréal in 1983. Originally administered by the Archaeological and Numismatic Society of Montreal, the museum became part of the City of Montreal's network of cultural centers in 1987.

== Collection ==
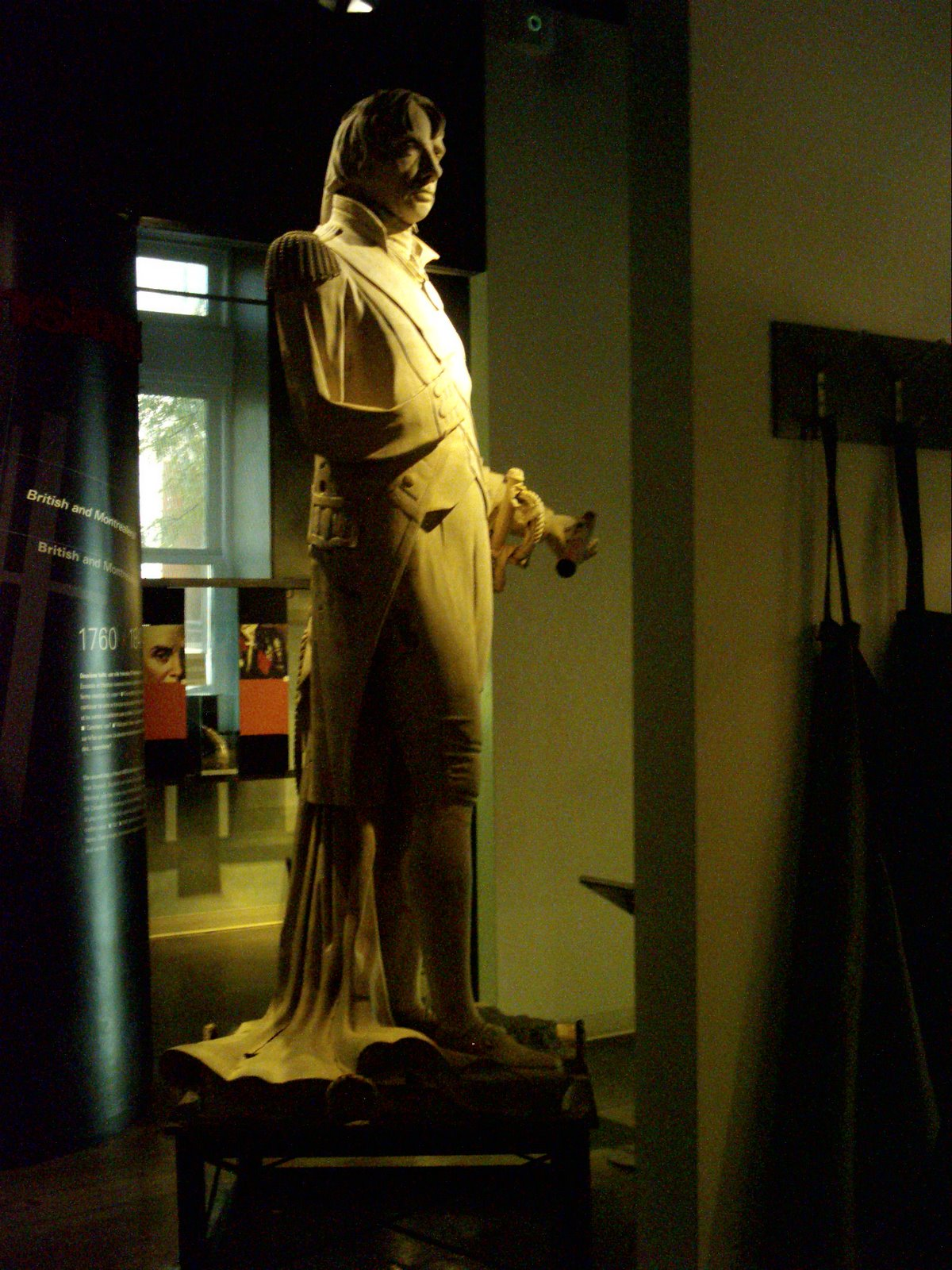
The original sculpture of Admiral Horatio Nelson, 1st Viscount Nelson, that was located atop of Nelson's Column on Place Jacques-Cartier.

On the ground floor, the permanent exhibition, "Montreal en cinq temps" promotes the events, places and residents that have made history. It includes reproductions of old maps, many photographs, and a varied collection of unique objects. In addition, visitors have the opportunity to view film clips and hear songs and stories.

The top two floors are devoted to temporary exhibitions with changing content.

The collection of the Centre d'histoire de Montreal is composed of more than 4,000 artifacts, dating mainly from the twentieth century. Objects from Expo 67 and from the 350th anniversary of Montreal. These collections are available on Artefacts Canada website.
