= First Ontario Parliament Buildings =

Demolished provincial parliament buildings, Canada

Coordinates: 43.64503°N 79.38715°W

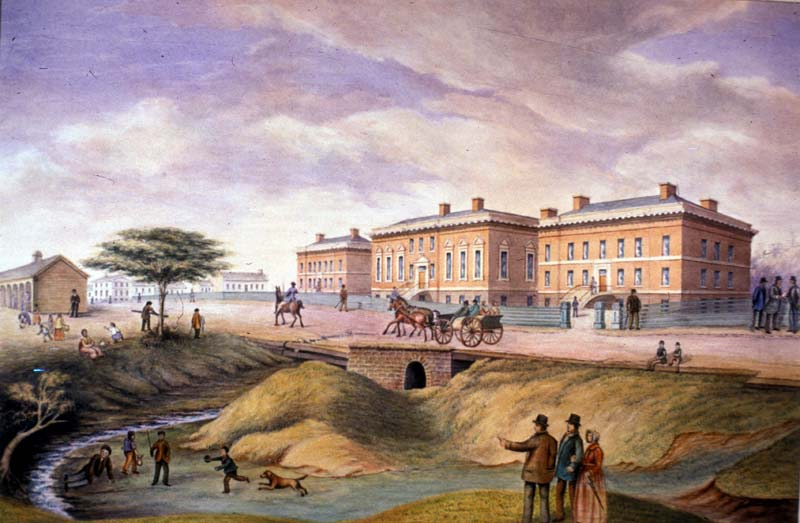
The Third Parliament Buildings of Upper Canada in 1834, shortly after completion.

The First Ontario Parliament Buildings (or the Third Parliament Buildings of Upper Canada) were built between 1829 and 1832 near Front, John, Simcoe and Wellington Streets in what was then York, Upper Canada (now Toronto, Ontario). They served as the parliament buildings for Upper Canada, the Province of Canada, and the province of Ontario after Canadian Confederation in 1867.

== History ==
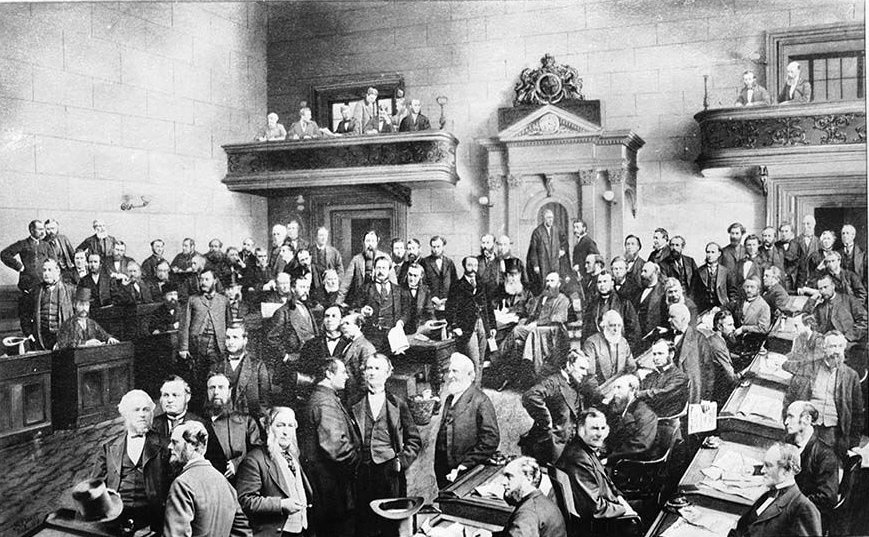
Members of Provincial Parliament in session within the Parliament Buildings, 1871.

The parliament buildings were the third legislature structures built by the Upper Canadian government in York, Upper Canada. Construction took place between 1829 and 1832, with J.G. Chewett, Cumberland & Storm (firm), Samuel Curry, John Ewart, John Howard and Thomas Rogers as the architects. Alterations took place in 1849.

The buildings were the third constructed for the parliament of Upper Canada, which sat in them from 1832 to 1841. Upper Canada was absorbed into the Province of Canada in 1841, and its capital rotated among several locations. The buildings served as the seat of government for the new province at various times between 1849 and 1859.

When the Province of Canada ceased to exist with the creation of Ontario at Confederation on July 1, 1867, Toronto was named the provincial capital, and these Front Street buildings were the first used by the Legislative Assembly of Ontario. Therefore, they are the Ontario legislature's first parliament buildings, but not the first parliament buildings ever built in present-day Ontario. The buildings were the last to have an upper chamber, as the new province of Ontario did not have a legislative council after 1866.

The Front Street location served the Ontario legislature from Confederation until 1893, when the new Ontario Legislative Building was opened at Queen's Park. The old structure, left abandoned, rapidly degraded from the elements and from vandalism. By the turn of the century, the prevailing sentiment in Canada was in favour of progress and not sentimentality. The parliament buildings on Front Street were subsequently demolished between 1900 and 1903. The site of Ontario's first parliament buildings is now occupied by Simcoe Place and the Canadian Broadcasting Centre.

== See also ==
- Parliament Buildings of Upper Canada

== Notes ==
Preceded by Bonsecours Market, Montreal	Site of the Legislative Assembly of the United Provinces of Canada; 1851–1854	Succeeded by Old Parliament Building (Quebec), Quebec City

Preceded by Quebec Music Hall and Quebec City Courthouse, Quebec	Site of the Legislative Assembly of the United Provinces of Canada; 1859–1860	Succeeded by Old Parliament Building (Quebec), Quebec
