= Bonsecours Market =

Historic site in Montreal, Canada

- Marché Bonsecours
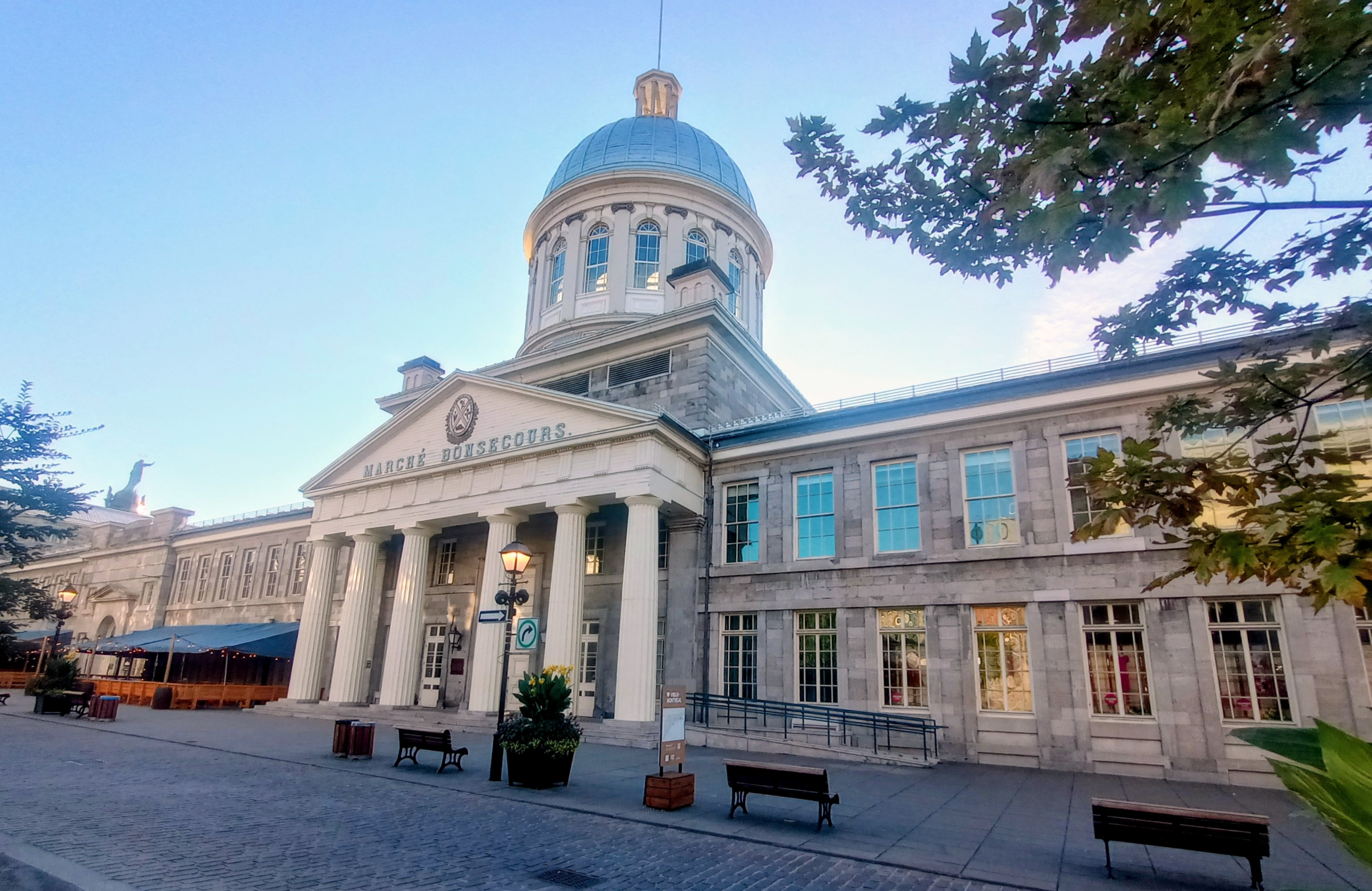
- Façade of Bonsecours Market

- Location within Montreal

General information
- Architectural style: Neoclassical architecture
- Location: 350 Saint-Paul east Montreal, Quebec, Canada; H2Y 1H2
- Coordinates: 45°30′32″N 73°33′05″W
- Construction started: 1844
- Completed: 1847

Design and construction
- Architect: William Footner

Website
- http://www.marchebonsecours.qc.ca/en/index.html

National Historic Site of Canada
- Official name: Bonsecours Market National Historic Site of Canada
- Designated: 1984

Bonsecours Market (French: Marché Bonsecours) is a two-story domed public market located in Montreal, Quebec, Canada at 350 Rue Saint-Paul in Old Montreal. For more than 100 years, it was the main public market in the Montreal area. It also briefly accommodated the Parliament of United Canada for one session in 1849.

Named for the adjacent Notre-Dame-de-Bon-Secours Chapel, it opened in 1847. During 1849 the building was used for the Legislative Assembly of the Province of Canada. The market's design was influenced by Dublin's Customs House.

== History ==
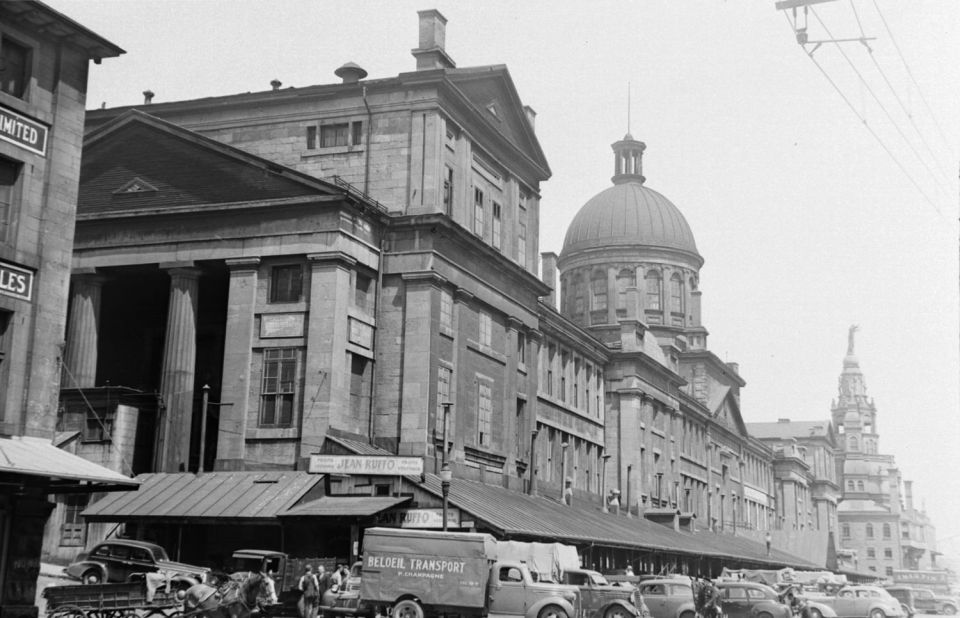
Market in 1940

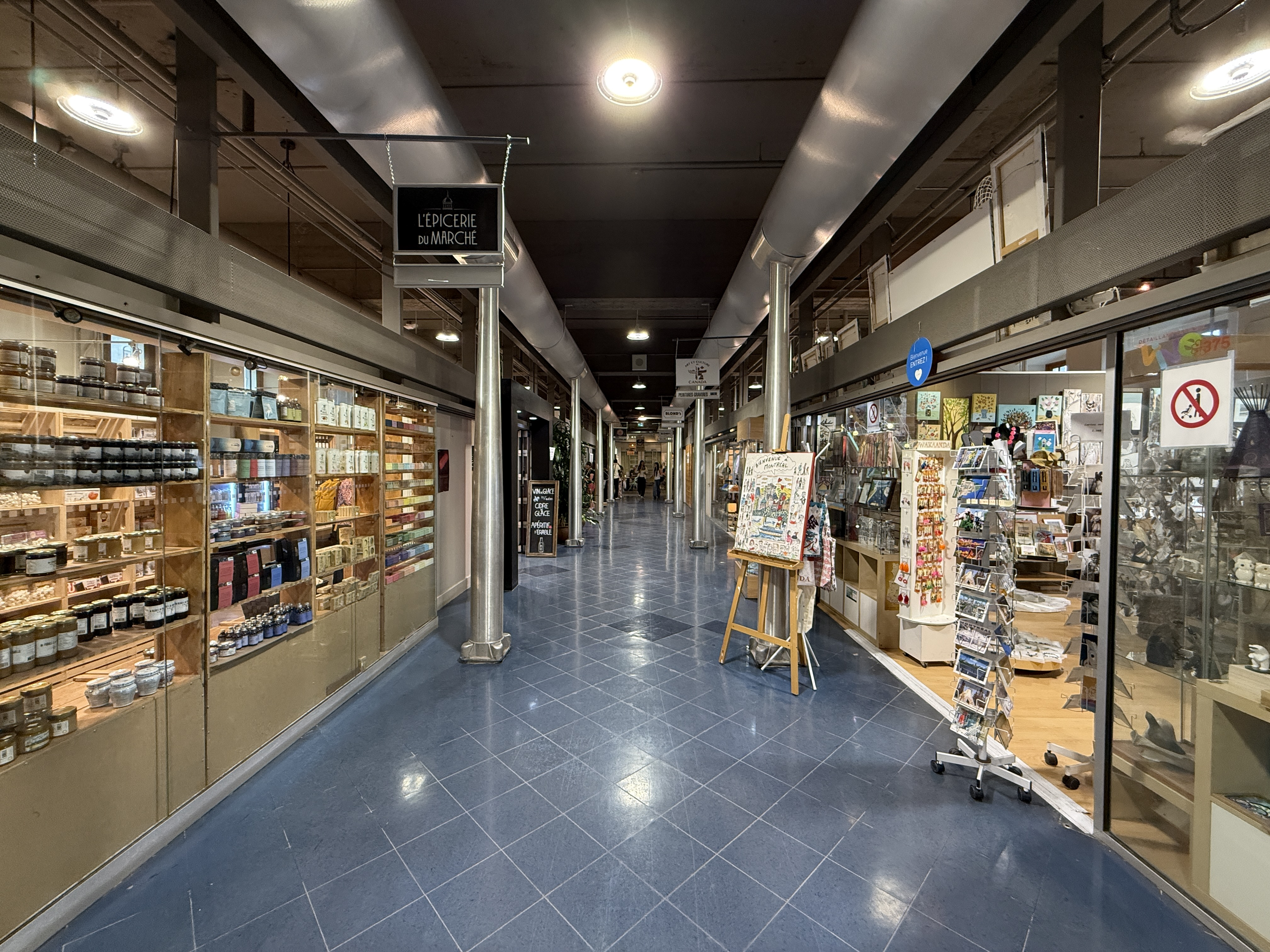
Level 2 Market in 2026

Construction of this Neoclassical building began in 1844 and were completed in 1847. It was designed by British architect William Footner, and alterations completed in 1860 were designed by Irish-born Montreal architect George Browne (1811–1885). Bonsecours Market also housed Montreal City Hall between 1852 and 1878. The former city hall chambers later became a 3700-square-meter meeting room.

The market building was also a venue for banquets, exhibitions and other festivals. Browne was charged with adding a 900-square-meter concert hall and banquet hall.

The building continued to house the farmer's central market, an increasingly multicultural mix of small vendors, until it was closed in 1963 and slated for demolition. However, the building was later transformed into a multi-purpose facility, with a mall that houses outdoor cafés, restaurants and boutiques on the main and second floors, as well as a rental hall and banquet rooms on the lower and upper floors and municipal office space.

Bonsecours Market was designated a National Historic Site of Canada in 1984.

== Legacy ==
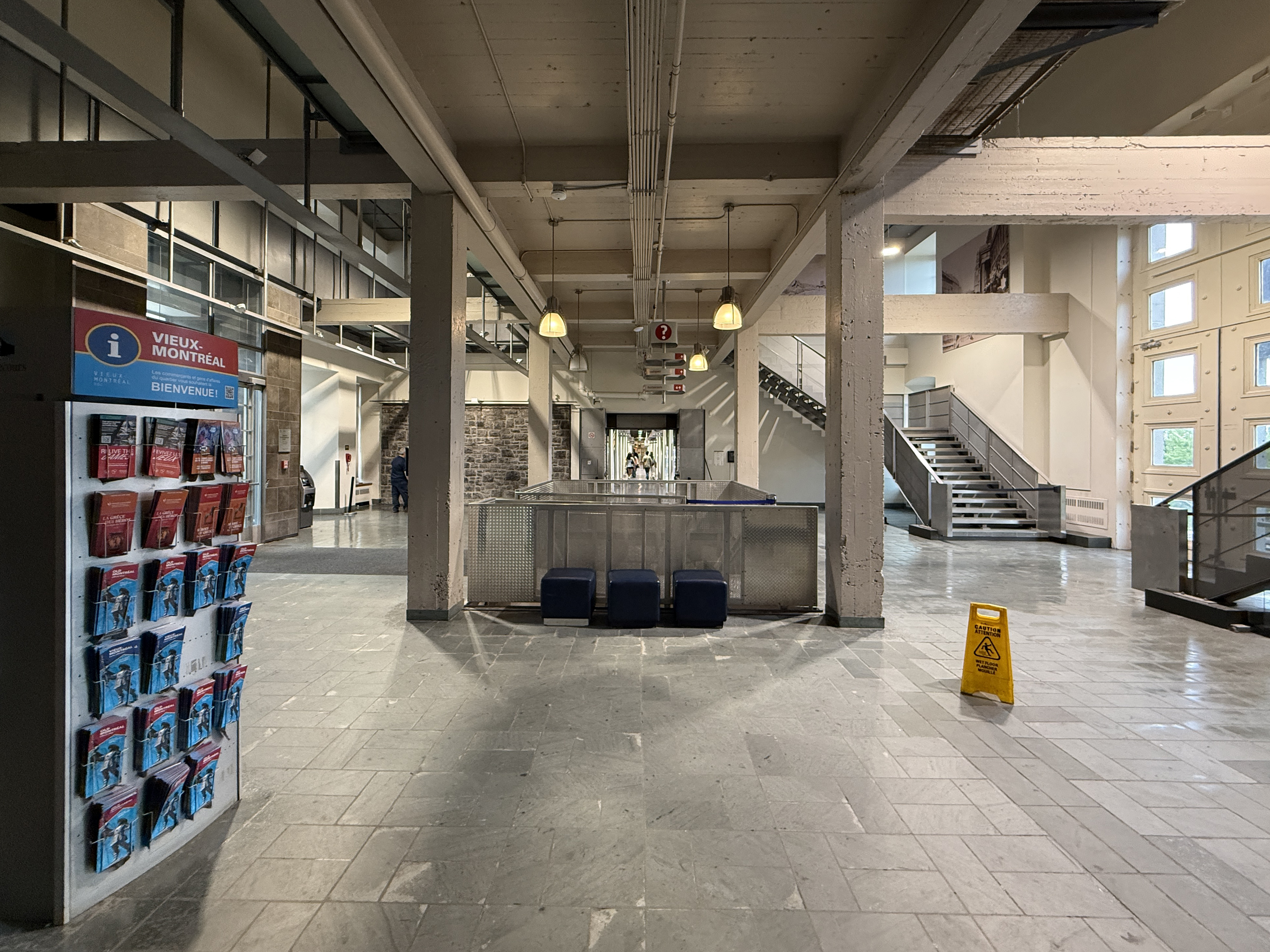
Lobby of the market (2026)

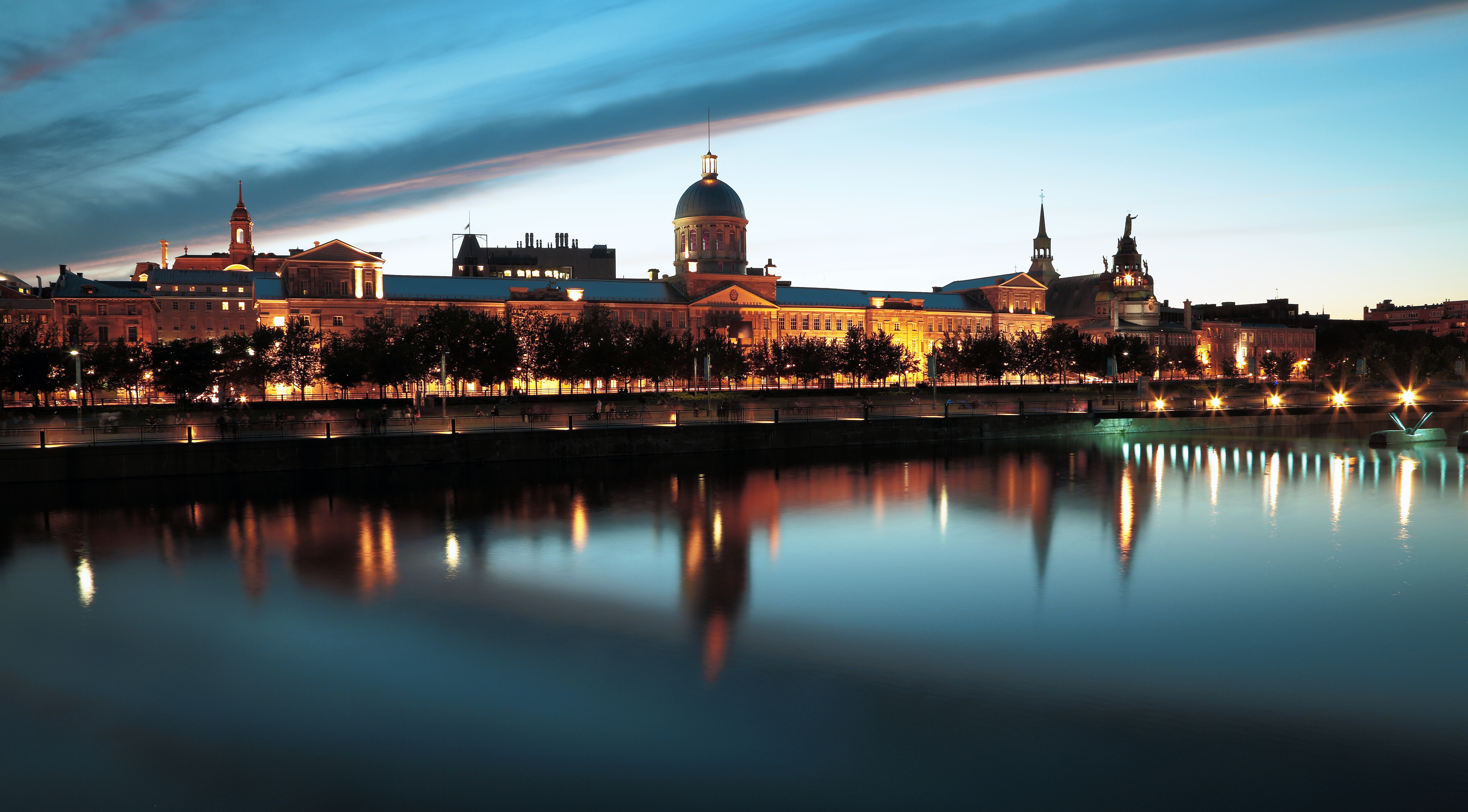
Bonsecours Market at night.

On 28 May 1990 Canada Post issued 'Bonsecours Market, Montreal' designed by Raymond Bellemare. The stamp features an image of the Bonsecours Market, which was designed by Montreal architect William Footner and constructed from 1842 to 1845. The $5 stamps are perforated 13.5 and were printed by British American Bank Note Company & Canadian Bank Note Company, Limited.

| Preceded by St. Anne Market — now Place d'Youville | Site of the Legislative Assembly of the United Provinces of Canada (as well as Freemason's Hall); 1849–1850 | Succeeded by Parliament of Canada West (3rd site), Toronto |
