= List of senators in the 45th Parliament of Canada =

This is a list of members of the Senate of Canada that have served in the 45th Canadian Parliament, Canada's current parliamentary term since May 26, 2025.

== Senators ==
Name	Senate affiliation	Province or territory (Senate division)	Date appointed	Nominated by	Retirement
Pierrette Ringuette	ISG	NB	2002-12-12	Chrétien	Incumbent
Percy Downe	CSG	PE	2003-06-26	Chrétien	Incumbent
Paul Massicotte	ISG	QC (De Lanaudière)	2003-06-26	Chrétien	2025-09-09
Michael L. MacDonald	CPC	NS	2009-01-02	Harper	Incumbent
Yonah Martin	CPC	BC	2009-01-02	Harper	Incumbent
Pamela Wallin	CSG	SK	2009-01-02	Harper	2026-10-18
Patrick Brazeau	NA	QC (Repentigny)	2009-01-08	Harper	Incumbent
Leo Housakos	CPC	QC (Wellington)	2009-01-08	Harper	Incumbent
Claude Carignan	CPC	QC (Mille Isles)	2009-08-27	Harper	Incumbent
Judith Seidman	CPC	QC (De la Durantaye)	2009-08-27	Harper	2025-09-01
Elizabeth Marshall	CPC	NL	2010-01-29	Harper	2026-03-23
Rose-May Poirier	CPC	NB	2010-02-28	Harper	Incumbent
Salma Ataullahjan	CPC	ON	2010-07-09	Harper	Incumbent
Fabian Manning	CPC	NL	2011-05-25	Harper	Incumbent
Larry Smith	CPC	QC (Saurel)	2011-05-25	Harper	2026-04-28
Josée Verner	CSG	QC (Montarville)	2011-06-13	Harper	Incumbent
Denise Batters	CPC	SK	2013-01-25	Harper	Incumbent
David Wells	CPC	NL	2013-01-25	Harper	Incumbent
Scott Tannas	CSG	AB	2013-03-25	Harper	Incumbent
Peter Harder	PSG	ON	2016-03-23	Trudeau, J.	Incumbent
Raymonde Gagné	NA	MB	2016-04-01	Trudeau, J.	Incumbent
Chantal Petitclerc	ISG	QC (Grandville)	2016-04-01	Trudeau, J.	Incumbent
Wanda Thomas Bernard	PSG	NS	2016-11-10	Trudeau, J.	Incumbent
Gwen Boniface	ISG	ON	2016-11-10	Trudeau, J.	2025-11-15
René Cormier	ISG	NB	2016-11-10	Trudeau, J.	Incumbent
Tony Dean	ISG	ON	2016-11-10	Trudeau, J.	Incumbent
Marilou McPhedran	NA	MB	2016-11-10	Trudeau, J.	2026-07-22
Lucie Moncion	ISG	ON	2016-11-10	Trudeau, J.	Incumbent
Kim Pate	ISG	ON	2016-11-10	Trudeau, J.	Incumbent
Yuen Pau Woo	ISG	BC	2016-11-10	Trudeau, J.	Incumbent
Éric Forest	ISG	QC (Gulf)	2016-11-21	Trudeau, J.	Incumbent
Marc Gold	NA	QC (Stadacona)	2016-11-25	Trudeau, J.	2025-06-30
Marie-Françoise Mégie	ISG	QC (Rougemont)	2016-11-25	Trudeau, J.	2025-09-20
Raymonde Saint-Germain	ISG	QC (De la Vallière)	2016-11-25	Trudeau, J.	2026-10-07
Rosa Galvez	ISG	QC (Bedford)	2016-12-06	Trudeau, J.	Incumbent
David Adams Richards	CSG	NB	2017-08-30	Trudeau, J.	2025-10-17
David Adams Richards	NA	NB	2017-08-30	Trudeau, J.	2025-10-17
David Adams Richards	CPC	NB	2017-08-30	Trudeau, J.	2025-10-17
Mary Coyle	ISG	NS	2017-12-04	Trudeau, J.	Incumbent
Mary Jane McCallum	CPC	MB	2017-12-04	Trudeau, J.	Incumbent
Robert Black	CSG	ON	2018-02-15	Trudeau, J.	Incumbent
Marty Deacon	ISG	ON	2018-02-15	Trudeau, J.	Incumbent
Yvonne Boyer	ISG	ON	2018-03-15	Trudeau, J.	Incumbent
Mohamed-Iqbal Ravalia	ISG	NL	2018-06-01	Trudeau, J.	Incumbent
Pierre Dalphond	ISG	QC (De Lorimier)	2018-06-06	Trudeau, J.	Incumbent
Donna Dasko	ISG	ON	2018-06-06	Trudeau, J.	2026-08-19
Colin Deacon	CSG	NS	2018-06-15	Trudeau, J.	Incumbent
Julie Miville-Dechêne	PSG	QC (Inkerman)	2018-06-20	Trudeau, J.	Incumbent
Bev Busson	ISG	BC	2018-09-24	Trudeau, J.	2026-08-23
Marty Klyne	PSG	SK	2018-09-24	Trudeau, J.	Incumbent
Peter Boehm	ISG	ON	2018-10-03	Trudeau, J.	Incumbent
Patti LaBoucane-Benson	NA	AB	2018-10-03	Trudeau, J.	Incumbent
Paula Simons	ISG	AB	2018-10-03	Trudeau, J.	Incumbent
Brian Francis	PSG	PE	2018-10-11	Trudeau, J.	Incumbent
Dawn Anderson	CPC	NT	2018-12-12	Trudeau, J.	Incumbent
Pat Duncan	NA	YT	2018-12-12	Trudeau, J.	Incumbent
Stan Kutcher	ISG	NS	2018-12-12	Trudeau, J.	Incumbent
Rosemary Moodie	ISG	ON	2018-12-12	Trudeau, J.	Incumbent
Tony Loffreda	ISG	QC (Shawinegan)	2019-07-22	Trudeau, J.	Incumbent
Bernadette Clement	ISG	ON	2021-06-22	Trudeau, J.	Incumbent
Jim Quinn	CPC	NB	2021-06-22	Trudeau, J.	Incumbent
Hassan Yussuff	ISG	ON	2021-06-22	Trudeau, J.	Incumbent
David Arnot	ISG	SK	2021-07-29	Trudeau, J.	Incumbent
Michèle Audette	PSG	QC (De Salaberry)	2021-07-29	Trudeau, J.	Incumbent
Amina Gerba	PSG	QC (Rigaud)	2021-07-29	Trudeau, J.	Incumbent
Clément Gignac	CSG	QC (Kennebec)	2021-07-29	Trudeau, J.	Incumbent
Karen Sorensen	PSG	AB	2021-07-29	Trudeau, J.	Incumbent
Flordeliz (Gigi) Osler	CSG	MB	2022-09-26	Trudeau, J.	Incumbent
Margo Greenwood	ISG	BC	2022-11-10	Trudeau, J.	Incumbent
Sharon Burey	CSG	ON	2022-11-21	Trudeau, J.	Incumbent
Andrew Cardozo	PSG	ON	2022-11-21	Trudeau, J.	Incumbent
Rebecca Patterson	CSG	ON	2022-11-21	Trudeau, J.	Incumbent
Jane MacAdam	ISG	PE	2023-05-03	Trudeau, J.	Incumbent
Iris Petten	NA	NL	2023-05-03	Trudeau, J.	Incumbent
Paul (PJ) Prosper	CSG	NS	2023-07-06	Trudeau, J.	Incumbent
Judy White	PSG	NL	2023-07-06	Trudeau, J.	Incumbent
Réjean Aucoin	CSG	NS	2023-10-31	Trudeau, J.	Incumbent
Rodger Cuzner	PSG	NS	2023-10-31	Trudeau, J.	Incumbent
Joan Kingston	ISG	NB	2023-10-31	Trudeau, J.	Incumbent
John McNair	ISG	NB	2023-10-31	Trudeau, J.	Incumbent
Krista Ross	CSG	NB	2023-10-31	Trudeau, J.	Incumbent
Marnie McBean	ISG	ON	2023-12-20	Trudeau, J.	Incumbent
Paulette Senior	ISG	ON	2023-12-20	Trudeau, J.	Incumbent
Toni Varone	ISG	ON	2023-12-20	Trudeau, J.	Incumbent
Mary Robinson	CSG	PE	2024-01-22	Trudeau, J.	Incumbent
Mohammad Al Zaibak	CSG	ON	2024-01-28	Trudeau, J.	2026-08-09
Manuelle Oudar	ISG	QC (La Salle)	2024-02-13	Trudeau, J.	Incumbent
Victor Boudreau	ISG	NB	2024-06-28	Trudeau, J.	Incumbent
Charles Adler	CSG	MB	2024-08-16	Trudeau, J.	Incumbent
Tracy Muggli	PSG	SK	2024-08-16	Trudeau, J.	Incumbent
Daryl Fridhandler	PSG	AB	2024-08-30	Trudeau, J.	Incumbent
Kristopher Wells	PSG	AB	2024-08-30	Trudeau, J.	Incumbent
Pierre Moreau	NA	QC (The Laurentides)	2024-09-10	Trudeau, J.	Incumbent
Suze Youance	ISG	QC (Lauzon)	2024-09-25	Trudeau, J.	Incumbent
Nancy Karetak-Lindell	ISG	NU	2024-12-19	Trudeau, J.	Incumbent
Allister Surette	ISG	NS	2024-12-19	Trudeau, J.	Incumbent
Baltej Dhillon	ISG	BC	2025-02-07	Trudeau, J.	Incumbent
Martine Hébert	ISG	QC (Victoria)	2025-02-07	Trudeau, J.	Incumbent
Todd Lewis	CSG	SK	2025-02-07	Trudeau, J.	2026-07-31 (died)
Danièle Henkel	PSG	QC (Alma)	2025-02-14	Trudeau, J.	Incumbent
Duncan Wilson	PSG	BC	2025-02-28	Trudeau, J.	Incumbent
Dawn Arnold	ISG	NB	2025-03-07	Trudeau, J.	Incumbent
Katherine Hay	PSG	ON	2025-03-07	Trudeau, J.	Incumbent
Tony Ince	CSG	NS	2025-03-07	Trudeau, J.	Incumbent
Farah Mohamed	ISG	ON	2025-03-07	Trudeau, J.	Incumbent
Sandra Pupatello	NA	ON	2025-03-07	Trudeau, J.	Incumbent
Rodney Ouellette	NA	NB	2026-07-09	Carney	Incumbent
Geeta Tucker	NA	MB	2026-07-09	Carney	Incumbent
Richard Martel	NA	QC (Rougemont)	2026-07-24	Carney	Incumbent
Tom Pitfield	NA	QC (De la Durantaye)	2026-09-18	Carney	Incumbent

== Changes in membership ==
=== Standings ===
Senate group changes during 45th Parliament
Date	ISG	CSG	PSG	CPC	NA	Vac.	Tot.
2025-04-28	45	18	18	12	12	0	105
2025-05-13	45	19	18	12	11	0	105
2025-05-14	45	19	18	11	11	1	105
2025-05-20	45	20	18	11	10	1	105
2025-05-26	45	21	18	11	9	1	105
2025-06-03	46	21	18	11	8	1	105
2025-06-04	46	21	18	12	7	1	105
2025-06-10	46	21	18	13	6	1	105
2025-06-11	46	20	18	14	6	1	105
2025-06-30	46	20	18	14	5	2	105
2025-07-18	46	20	17	14	6	2	105
2025-08-01	45	20	18	14	6	2	105
2025-09-01	45	20	18	13	6	3	105
2025-09-05	46	20	17	13	6	3	105
2025-09-09	45	20	17	13	6	4	105
2025-09-21	44	20	17	13	6	5	105
2025-09-23	43	20	17	13	7	5	105
2025-09-25	43	19	17	13	8	5	105
2025-10-09	43	19	16	14	8	5	105
2025-10-17	43	19	16	13	8	6	105
2025-11-15	42	19	16	13	8	7	105
2026-03-18	41	19	17	13	8	7	105
2026-03-23	41	19	17	12	8	8	105
2026-04-28	41	19	17	11	8	9	105
2026-05-24	40	19	17	11	8	10	105
2026-07-08	40	18	17	12	8	10	105
2026-07-09	40	18	17	12	10	8	105
2026-07-22	40	18	17	12	9	9	105
2026-07-24	40	18	17	12	10	8	105
2026-07-31	40	17	17	12	10	9	105
2026-08-09	40	16	17	12	10	10	105
2026-08-19	39	16	17	12	10	11	105
2026-08-23	38	16	17	12	10	12	105
2026-09-18	38	16	17	12	11	11	105
2026-10-07	37	16	17	12	11	12	105
2026-10-18	37	15	17	12	11	13	105

=== List of changes ===
May 26, 2025 – present
Date	Member	Before party	After party	Reason
May 21, 2025	David Adams Richards	█ Canadian Senators Group	█ Non-affiliated	Left caucus
June 3, 2025	David Adams Richards	█ Non-affiliated	█ Conservative	Joined caucus
June 10, 2025	Mary Jane McCallum	█ Non-affiliated	█ Conservative	Joined caucus
June 12, 2025	Larry Smith	█ Canadian Senators Group	█ Conservative	Crossed-floor
June 30, 2025	Marc Gold	█ Non-affiliated	█ Vacant	Retired
September 1, 2025	Judith Seidman	█ Conservative	█ Vacant	Retired
September 9, 2025	Paul Massicotte	█ Independent Senators Group	█ Vacant	Retired
September 20, 2025	Marie-Françoise Mégie	█ Independent Senators Group	█ Vacant	Retired
October 17, 2025	David Adams Richards	█ Conservative	█ Vacant	Retired
November 15, 2025	Gwen Boniface	█ Independent Senators Group	█ Vacant	Retired
April 28, 2026	Larry Smith	█ Conservative	█ Vacant	Retired
July 8, 2026	Jim Quinn	█ Canadian Senators Group	█ Conservative	Crossed-floor
July 22, 2026	Marilou McPhedran	█ Non-affiliated	█ Vacant	Retired
July 31, 2026	Todd Lewis	█ Canadian Senators Group	█ Vacant	Died in office
August 9, 2026	Mohammad Al Zaibak	█ Canadian Senators Group	█ Vacant	Retired
August 19, 2026	Donna Dasko	█ Independent Senators Group	█ Vacant	Retired
August 23, 2026	Bev Busson	█ Independent Senators Group	█ Vacant	Retired
October 6, 2026	Richard Martel	█ Non-affiliated	█ Conservative	Rejoined party
October 7, 2026	Raymonde Saint-Germain	█ Independent Senators Group	█ Vacant	Retired
October 18, 2026	Pamela Wallin	█ Canadian Senators Group	█ Vacant	Retired
