= List of current senators of Canada =

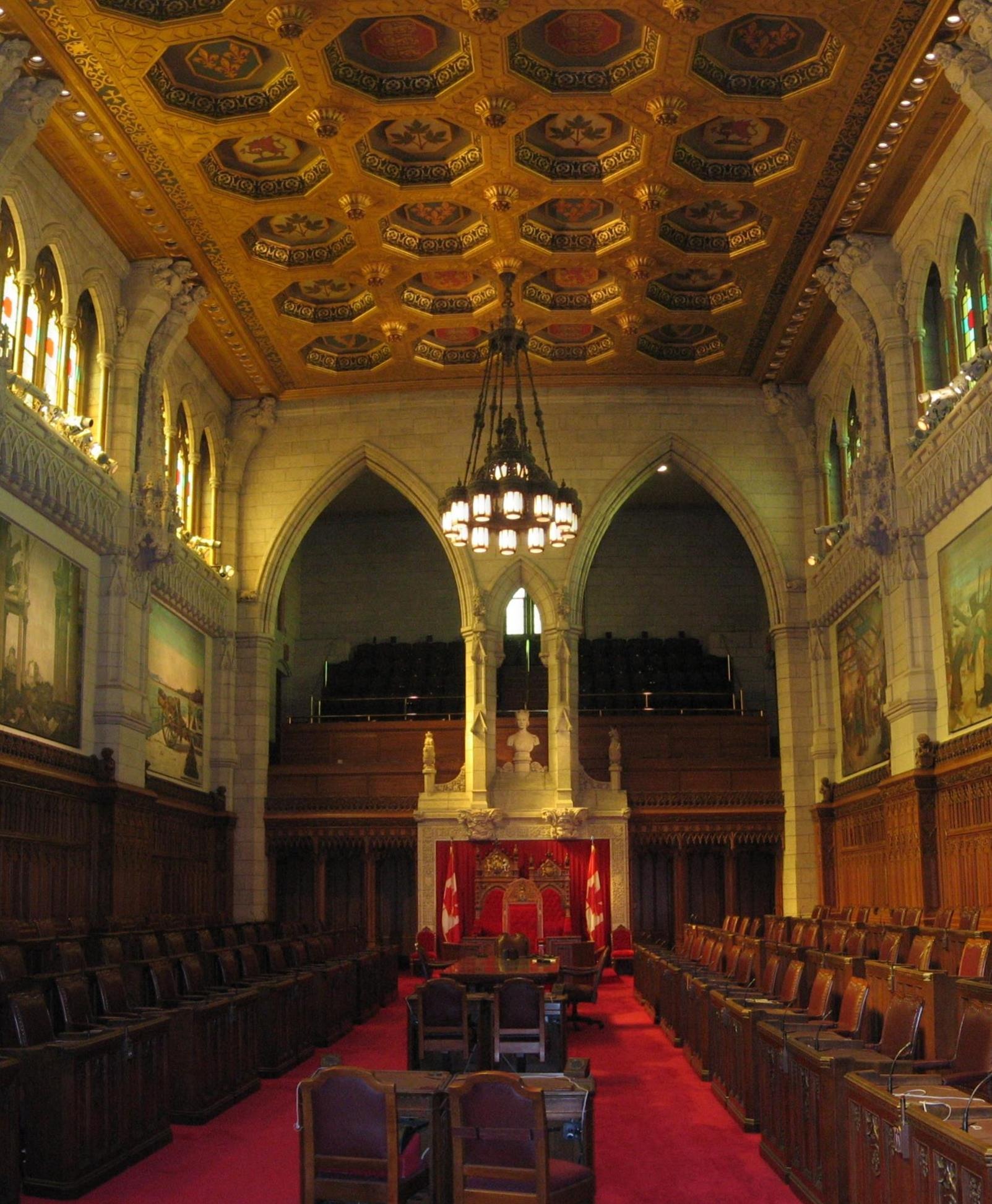
The Senate Chamber, located in the Centre Block of Parliament Hill

This article provides an up-to-date list of the members of the Senate of Canada (Le Sénat du Canada), the upper house of the Parliament of Canada, including their names, provinces or territories, political affiliations, and appointment dates. The list reflects the latest official records and is presented in a sortable table format. The 105 senators are appointed by the governor general on the advice of the prime minister, unlike the elected members of the House of Commons.

Senators originally held their seats for life; however, under the British North America Act, 1965, members may not sit in the Senate after reaching the age of 75.

As of 18 October 2026, there are 92 sitting senators: 37 are members of the Independent Senators Group, 17 are members of the Progressive Senate Group, 15 are members of the Canadian Senators Group, 13 are members of the senate caucus of the Conservative Party of Canada, and 10 are non-affiliated. There are thirteen vacancies. Current senators have been appointed on the advice of Mark Carney, Justin Trudeau, Stephen Harper, and Jean Chrétien.

== Regional allocation ==
Senate seats are allocated on a regional basis:

- 24 seats for Ontario
- 24 seats for Quebec
- 24 seats for the Maritime provinces (divided into 10 for each Nova Scotia and New Brunswick and 4 for Prince Edward Island)
- 24 seats for the Western provinces (divided into six each)
- 6 seats for Newfoundland and Labrador
- 1 seat each for the Northwest Territories, Yukon, and Nunavut

Quebec is unique in having 24 constitutionally mandated Senate divisions. See Quebec Senate divisions for details. In other provinces, senators may choose a division name, but this has no constitutional significance.

== Notable positions ==
- Speaker of the Senate: Raymonde Gagné
- Speaker pro tempore: René Cormier
- Government Representative: Pierre Moreau
- Legislative Deputy to the Government Representative: Patti LaBoucane-Benson
- Leader of the Opposition: Leo Housakos
- Deputy Leader of the Opposition: Yonah Martin
- Facilitator of the Independent Senators Group: Lucie Moncion
- Leader of the Canadian Senators Group: Scott Tannas
- Leader of the Progressive Senate Group: Brian Francis

Pierrette Ringuette is the longest-serving current senator; she was appointed on the advice of Jean Chrétien in 2002.

== Current senators ==
Name	Senate affiliation	Province or territory (Senate division)	Date nominated	Appointed on the advice of	Mandatory retirement	Titles
Pierrette Ringuette	ISG	NB	2002-12-12	Chrétien	2030-12-31	
Percy Downe	CSG	PE	2003-06-26	Chrétien	2029-07-08	Liaison (whip) of the CSG
Michael L. MacDonald	CPC	NS	2009-01-02	Harper	2030-05-04	
Yonah Martin	CPC	BC	2009-01-02	Harper	2040-04-11	Deputy Opposition Leader
Patrick Brazeau	NA	QC (Repentigny)	2009-01-08	Harper	2049-11-11	
Leo Housakos	CPC	QC (Wellington)	2009-01-08	Harper	2043-01-10	Leader of the Opposition in the Senate (Note: former speaker of the Senate of Canada)
Claude Carignan	CPC	QC (Mille Isles)	2009-08-27	Harper	2039-12-04	(Note: former government representative in the Senate and former leader of the opposition in the Senate (Canada))
Rose-May Poirier	CPC	NB	2010-02-28	Harper	2029-03-02	
Salma Ataullahjan	CPC	ON	2010-07-09	Harper	2027-04-29	
Fabian Manning	CPC	NL	2011-05-25	Harper	2039-05-21	
Josée Verner	CSG	QC (Montarville)	2011-06-13	Harper	2034-12-30	
Denise Batters	CPC	SK	2013-01-25	Harper	2045-06-18	Chair of the Conservative Caucus
David Wells	CPC	NL	2013-01-25	Harper	2037-02-28	
Scott Tannas	CSG	AB	2013-03-25	Harper	2037-02-25	Leader of the CSG
Peter Harder	PSG	ON	2016-03-23	Trudeau, J.	2027-08-25	(Note: former representative of the Government in the Senate)
Raymonde Gagné	NA	MB	2016-04-01	Trudeau, J.	2031-01-07	Speaker of the Senate
Chantal Petitclerc	ISG	QC (Grandville)	2016-04-01	Trudeau, J.	2044-12-15	Chair of ISG Deliberations
Wanda Thomas Bernard	PSG	NS	2016-11-10	Trudeau, J.	2028-08-01	
René Cormier	ISG	NB	2016-11-10	Trudeau, J.	2031-04-27	Speaker pro tempore
Tony Dean	ISG	ON	2016-11-10	Trudeau, J.	2028-08-19	
Lucie Moncion	ISG	ON	2016-11-10	Trudeau, J.	2033-10-25	
Kim Pate	ISG	ON	2016-11-10	Trudeau, J.	2034-11-10	
Yuen Pau Woo	ISG	BC	2016-11-10	Trudeau, J.	2038-03-02	(Note: former facilitator of the ISG)
Éric Forest	ISG	QC (Gulf)	2016-11-21	Trudeau, J.	2027-04-06	
Rosa Galvez	ISG	QC (Bedford)	2016-12-06	Trudeau, J.	2036-06-21	
Mary Coyle	ISG	NS	2017-12-04	Trudeau, J.	2029-11-05	
Mary Jane McCallum	CPC	MB	2017-12-04	Trudeau, J.	2027-05-01	
Robert Black	CSG	ON	2018-02-15	Trudeau, J.	2037-03-27	
Marty Deacon	ISG	ON	2018-02-15	Trudeau, J.	2033-04-23	
Yvonne Boyer	ISG	ON	2018-03-15	Trudeau, J.	2028-10-25	
Mohamed-Iqbal Ravalia	ISG	NL	2018-06-01	Trudeau, J.	2032-08-15	
Pierre Dalphond	ISG	QC (De Lorimier)	2018-06-06	Trudeau, J.	2029-05-01	
Colin Deacon	CSG	NS	2018-06-15	Trudeau, J.	2034-11-01	
Julie Miville-Dechêne	PSG	QC (Inkerman)	2018-06-20	Trudeau, J.	2034-07-10	
Marty Klyne	PSG	SK	2018-09-24	Trudeau, J.	2032-03-06	
Peter Boehm	ISG	ON	2018-10-03	Trudeau, J.	2029-04-26	
Patti LaBoucane-Benson	NA	AB	2018-10-03	Trudeau, J.	2044-02-20	Deputy Gov. Representative (GRO)
Paula Simons	ISG	AB	2018-10-03	Trudeau, J.	2039-09-07	
Brian Francis	PSG	PE	2018-10-11	Trudeau, J.	2032-09-28	Leader of the PSG
Dawn Anderson	CPC	NT	2018-12-12	Trudeau, J.	2042-04-14	
Pat Duncan	NA	YT	2018-12-12	Trudeau, J.	2035-04-08	Deputy Gov. Liaison (whip, GR0)
Rosemary Moodie	ISG	ON	2018-12-12	Trudeau, J.	2031-11-24	
Tony Loffreda	ISG	QC (Shawinegan)	2019-07-22	Trudeau, J.	2037-08-14	
Bernadette Clement	ISG	ON	2021-06-22	Trudeau, J.	2040-05-17	Deputy Facilitator of the ISG
Jim Quinn	CPC	NB	2021-06-22	Trudeau, J.	2032-01-25	
Hassan Yussuff	ISG	ON	2021-06-22	Trudeau, J.	2031-12-15	
David Arnot	ISG	SK	2021-07-29	Trudeau, J.	2027-04-16	ISG Legislative Liaison
Michèle Audette	PSG	QC (De Salaberry)	2021-07-29	Trudeau, J.	2046-07-20	
Amina Gerba	PSG	QC (Rigaud)	2021-07-29	Trudeau, J.	2036-03-14	Liaison (whip) of the PSG
Clément Gignac	CSG	QC (Kennebec)	2021-07-29	Trudeau, J.	2030-05-07	
Karen Sorensen	PSG	AB	2021-07-29	Trudeau, J.	2034-05-20	
Flordeliz (Gigi) Osler	CSG	MB	2022-09-26	Trudeau, J.	2043-09-09	Chair of the CSG
Margo Greenwood	ISG	BC	2022-11-10	Trudeau, J.	2028-09-02	
Sharon Burey	CSG	ON	2022-11-21	Trudeau, J.	2032-12-04	
Andrew Cardozo	PSG	ON	2022-11-21	Trudeau, J.	2031-03-21	
Rebecca Patterson	CSG	ON	2022-11-21	Trudeau, J.	2040-06-15	Deputy Leader of the CSG
Jane MacAdam	ISG	PE	2023-05-03	Trudeau, J.	2032-03-01	
Iris Petten	NA	NL	2023-05-03	Trudeau, J.	2034-02-05	Gov. Liaison (whip) (GRO)
Paul (PJ) Prosper	CSG	NS	2023-07-06	Trudeau, J.	2039-11-04	
Judy White	PSG	NL	2023-07-06	Trudeau, J.	2039-01-11	Deputy Leader of the PSG
Réjean Aucoin	CSG	NS	2023-10-31	Trudeau, J.	2030-07-04	
Rodger Cuzner	PSG	NS	2023-10-31	Trudeau, J.	2030-11-04	
Joan Kingston	ISG	NB	2023-10-31	Trudeau, J.	2030-01-08	
John McNair	ISG	NB	2023-10-31	Trudeau, J.	2032-06-03	
Krista Ross	CSG	NB	2023-10-31	Trudeau, J.	2042-09-30	Deputy Liaison (whip) of the CSG
Marnie McBean	ISG	ON	2023-12-20	Trudeau, J.	2043-01-28	
Paulette Senior	ISG	ON	2023-12-20	Trudeau, J.	2036-12-04	
Toni Varone	ISG	ON	2023-12-20	Trudeau, J.	2033-06-20	
Mary Robinson	CSG	PE	2024-01-22	Trudeau, J.	2045-08-03	
Manuelle Oudar	ISG	QC (La Salle)	2024-02-13	Trudeau, J.	2038-07-05	
Victor Boudreau	ISG	NB	2024-06-28	Trudeau, J.	2045-05-03	
Charles Adler	CSG	MB	2024-08-16	Trudeau, J.	2029-08-25	
Tracy Muggli	PSG	SK	2024-08-16	Trudeau, J.	2040-09-18	Deputy Liaison (whip) and Caucus Chair of the PSG
Daryl Fridhandler	PSG	AB	2024-08-30	Trudeau, J.	2031-10-09	
Kristopher Wells	PSG	AB	2024-08-30	Trudeau, J.	2046-10-07	
Pierre Moreau	NA	QC (The Laurentides)	2024-09-10	Trudeau, J.	2032-12-12	Government Representative (GRO)
Suze Youance	ISG	QC (Lauzon)	2024-09-25	Trudeau, J.	2045-08-11	
Nancy Karetak-Lindell	ISG	NU	2024-12-19	Trudeau, J.	2032-12-10	
Allister Surette	ISG	NS	2024-12-19	Trudeau, J.	2036-09-21	
Baltej Dhillon	ISG	BC	2025-02-07	Trudeau, J.	2041-11-13	
Martine Hébert	ISG	QC (Victoria)	2025-02-07	Trudeau, J.	2040-10-07	
Danièle Henkel	PSG	QC (Alma)	2025-02-14	Trudeau, J.	2031-01-16	
Duncan Wilson	PSG	BC	2025-02-28	Trudeau, J.	2042-09-26	
Dawn Arnold	ISG	NB	2025-03-07	Trudeau, J.	2041-04-23	
Katherine Hay	PSG	ON	2025-03-07	Trudeau, J.	2036-01-16	
Tony Ince	CSG	NS	2025-03-07	Trudeau, J.	2032-12-16	
Farah Mohamed	ISG	ON	2025-03-07	Trudeau, J.	2045-07-05	
Sandra Pupatello	NA	ON	2025-03-07	Trudeau, J.	2037-10-06	Chair of the GRO
Rodney Ouellette	NA	NB	2026-07-09	Carney	2040-10-02	
Geeta Tucker	NA	MB	2026-07-09	Carney	2046-05-02	
Richard Martel	CPC	QC (Rougemont)	2026-07-24	Carney	2036-03-23	
Thomas Pitfield	NA	QC (De la Durantaye)	2026-09-18	Carney	2037-03-27	

== Notes ==
Membership changes since the last election

Date	Name	Province or territory (Senate division)	Affiliation before	Affiliation after	Reason
2025-05-13	Tony Ince	NS	NA	CSG	Joined CSG
2025-05-14	Don Plett	MB	CPC	Vacant	Mandatory retirement
2025-05-20	Sandra Pupatello	ON	NA	CSG	Joined CSG
2025-05-26	Charles Adler	MB	NA	CSG	Joined CSG
2025-06-03	Farah Mohamed	ON	NA	ISG	Joined ISG
2025-06-04	David Adams Richards	NB	NA	CPC	Joined Conservatives
2025-06-10	Mary Jane McCallum	MB	NA	CPC	Joined Conservatives
2025-06-11	Larry Smith	QC (Saurel)	CSG	CPC	Joined Conservatives
2025-06-30	Marc Gold	QC (Stadacona)	NA	Vacant	Mandatory retirement
2025-07-18	Pierre Moreau	QC (The Laurentides)	PSG	NA	Left PSG upon becoming Government Rep.
2025-08-01	Julie Miville-Dechêne	QC (Inkerman)	ISG	PSG	Joined PSG
2025-09-01	Judith Seidman	QC (De la Durantaye)	CPC	Vacant	Mandatory retirement
2025-09-05	Pierre Dalphond	QC (De Lorimier)	PSG	ISG	Joined ISG
2025-09-09	Paul Massicotte	QC (De Lanaudière)	ISG	Vacant	Resigned
2025-09-21	Marie-Françoise Mégie	QC (Rougemont)	ISG	Vacant	Mandatory retirement
2025-09-23	Pat Duncan	YT	ISG	NA	Left ISG
2025-09-25	Sandra Pupatello	ON	CSG	NA	Left CSG
2025-10-09	Margaret Dawn Anderson	NT	PSG	CPC	Joined Conservatives
2025-10-17	David Adams Richards	NB	CPC	Vacant	Mandatory retirement
2025-11-15	Gwen Boniface	ON	ISG	Vacant	Resigned
2026-03-18	Karen Sorensen	AB	ISG	PSG	Joined PSG
2026-03-23	Elizabeth Marshall	NL	CPC	Vacant	Resigned
2026-04-28	Larry Smith	QC (Saurel)	CPC	Vacant	Mandatory retirement
2026-05-24	Stan Kutcher	NS	ISG	Vacant	Resigned
2026-07-07	Richard Martel	QC (Rougemont)	Vacant	NA	Appointed
2026-07-07	Rodney Ouellette	NB	Vacant	NA	Appointed
2026-07-07	Thomas Pitfield	QC (De la Durantaye)	Vacant	NA	Appointed
2026-07-07	Geeta Tucker	MB	Vacant	NA	Appointed
2026-07-08	Jim Quinn	NB	CSG	CPC	Joined CPC
2026-07-22	Marilou McPhedran	MB	NA	Vacant	Mandatory retirement
2026-07-31	Todd Lewis	SK	CSG	Vacant	Death
2026-08-09	Mohammad Al Zaibak	ON	CSG	Vacant	Mandatory retirement
2026-10-07	Raymonde Saint-Germain	QC	ISG	Vacant	Mandatory retirement
2026-10-18	Pamela Wallin	SK	CSG	Vacant	Resignation

== Standings ==
The Senate of Canada has 105 seats; As of 18 October 2026, 92 of these are filled and 13 are vacant.

Members of the Senate of Canada may sit as representatives of a group or political party, if agreed by both the senator and the group.

Current composition of the Senate by affiliation and province

Affiliation	AB	BC	MB	NB	NL	NT	NS	NU	ON	PE	QC	SK	YT	Total
ISG	1	3	0	6	1	0	2	1	13	1	8	1	0	37
CSG	1	0	2	1	0	0	4	0	3	2	2	0	0	15
PSG	3	1	0	0	1	0	2	0	3	1	4	2	0	17
CPC	0	1	1	2	2	1	1	0	1	0	3	1	0	13
Non-affiliated	1	0	2	1	1	0	0	0	1	2	3	0	1	10
Vacant	0	1	1	0	1	0	1	0	3	0	4	2	0	13
Total:	6	6	6	10	6	1	10	1	24	4	24	6	1	105

Seating plan of the Canadian Senate

Standings changes since the last election

Senate group changes during 45th Parliament
Date	ISG	CSG	PSG	CPC	NA	Vac.	Tot.
2025-04-28	45	18	18	12	12	0	105
2025-05-13	45	19	18	12	11	0	105
2025-05-14	45	19	18	11	11	1	105
2025-05-20	45	20	18	11	10	1	105
2025-05-26	45	21	18	11	9	1	105
2025-06-03	46	21	18	11	8	1	105
2025-06-04	46	21	18	12	7	1	105
2025-06-10	46	21	18	13	6	1	105
2025-06-11	46	20	18	14	6	1	105
2025-06-30	46	20	18	14	5	2	105
2025-07-18	46	20	17	14	6	2	105
2025-08-01	45	20	18	14	6	2	105
2025-09-01	45	20	18	13	6	3	105
2025-09-05	46	20	17	13	6	3	105
2025-09-09	45	20	17	13	6	4	105
2025-09-21	44	20	17	13	6	5	105
2025-09-23	43	20	17	13	7	5	105
2025-09-25	43	19	17	13	8	5	105
2025-10-09	43	19	16	14	8	5	105
2025-10-17	43	19	16	13	8	6	105
2025-11-15	42	19	16	13	8	7	105
2026-03-18	41	19	17	13	8	7	105
2026-03-23	41	19	17	12	8	8	105
2026-04-28	41	19	17	11	8	9	105
2026-05-24	40	19	17	11	8	10	105
2026-07-08	40	18	17	12	8	10	105
2026-07-09	40	18	17	12	10	8	105
2026-07-22	40	18	17	12	9	9	105
2026-07-24	40	18	17	12	10	8	105
2026-07-31	40	17	17	12	10	9	105
2026-08-09	40	16	17	12	10	10	105
2026-08-19	39	16	17	12	10	11	105
2026-08-23	38	16	17	12	10	12	105
2026-09-18	38	16	17	12	11	11	105
2026-10-07	37	16	17	12	11	12	105
2026-10-18	37	15	17	12	11	13	105

== Appointment breakdown ==
Appointments by prime minister and current affiliation
Prime Minister	Term	ISG	CSG	PSG	CPC	NA	Total
Jean Chrétien	1993–2003	1	1	0	0	0	2
Stephen Harper	2006–2015	0	2	0	9	1	12
Justin Trudeau	2015–2025	36	12	17	3	6	74
Mark Carney	2025–present	0	0	0	1	3	4
Total:		37	15	17	13	10	92

== Vacancies ==
Province (Division)	Seat last held by	Affiliation	Reason for vacancy	Vacant since	
Quebec (Stadacona)	Marc Gold	Non-affiliated	Mandatory retirement	June 30, 2025	488 days
Quebec (De Lanaudière)	Paul Massicotte	ISG	Resigned	September 9, 2025	417 days
Ontario	Gwen Boniface	ISG	Resigned	November 15, 2025	350 days
Newfoundland and Labrador	Elizabeth Marshall	Conservative	Resigned	March 23, 2026	222 days
Quebec (Saurel)	Larry Smith	Conservative	Mandatory retirement	April 28, 2026	186 days
Nova Scotia	Stan Kutcher	ISG	Resigned	May 24, 2026	160 days
Manitoba	Marilou McPhedran	Non-affiliated	Mandatory retirement	July 22, 2026	101 days
Saskatchewan	Todd Lewis	CSG	Death	July 31, 2026	92 days
Ontario	Mohammad Al Zaibak	CSG	Mandatory retirement	August 9, 2026	83 days
Ontario	Donna Dasko	ISG	Mandatory retirement	August 19, 2026	73 days
British Columbia	Bev Busson	ISG	Mandatory retirement	August 23, 2026	69 days
Quebec (De la Vallière)	Raymonde Saint-Germain	ISG	Mandatory retirement	October 7, 2026	24 days
Saskatchewan	Pamela Wallin	CSG	Resignation	October 18, 2026	13 days

Upcoming retirements

Senators scheduled to retire before the next federal election
Name	Mandatory retirement date	Appointed on the advice of	Province or territory (Senate division)
Éric Forest	2027-04-06	Trudeau, J.	Quebec (Gulf)
David Arnot	2027-04-16	Trudeau, J.	Saskatchewan
Salma Ataullahjan	2027-04-29	Harper	Ontario
Mary Jane McCallum	2027-05-01	Trudeau, J.	Manitoba
Peter Harder	2027-08-25	Trudeau, J.	Ontario
Wanda Thomas Bernard	2028-08-01	Trudeau, J.	Nova Scotia
Tony Dean	2028-08-19	Trudeau, J.	Ontario
Margo Greenwood	2028-09-02	Trudeau, J.	British Columbia
Yvonne Boyer	2028-10-25	Trudeau, J.	Ontario
Rose-May Poirier	2029-03-02	Harper	New Brunswick
Peter Boehm	2029-04-26	Trudeau, J.	Ontario
Pierre Dalphond	2029-05-01	Trudeau, J.	Quebec (De Lorimier)
Percy Downe	2029-07-08	Chrétien	Prince Edward Island
Charles Adler	2029-08-25	Trudeau, J.	Manitoba

== Longevity ==
Furthest year of retirement of existing senators, by Prime Minister:

- Pierrette Ringuette, appointed by Jean Chrétien, is due to retire on December 31, 2030.
- Geeta Tucker, appointed by Mark Carney, is due to retire on May 2, 2046.
- Kristopher Wells, appointed by Justin Trudeau, is due to retire on October 7, 2046.
- Patrick Brazeau, appointed by Stephen Harper, is due to retire on November 11, 2049.

== See also ==
- Senate of Canada
- List of Senate of Canada appointments by prime minister
- List of women appointed to the Canadian Senate
