= List of women appointed to the Canadian Senate =

Women have been serving in the Canadian Senate since 1930, when Senator Cairine Wilson became the first woman appointed to the Senate by the government of Prime Minister William Lyon Mackenzie King. Since then, women have represented every province and territory in the Senate.

Women won the right to be appointed to the Senate in 1929 due to the Famous Five Persons Case (Edwards v Canada (AG)).

== Former women senators ==
The following women were appointed to the Senate of Canada but no longer serve. This table follows the structure used in the List of current senators of Canada.

Historical Women Senators of Canada
Name	Province or Territory (Senate Division)	Date Appointed	Date Left Office	Appointed on the advice of	Notes or Titles	Other Professions
Cairine Wilson	ON (Rockcliffe)	1930-02-15	1962-03-03	King	First woman appointed senator	homemaker, social worker
Iva Campbell Fallis	ON (Peterborough)	1935-07-20	1956-03-07	Bennett		homemaker, teacher
Muriel McQueen Fergusson	NB (Fredericton)	1953-05-19	1975-05-23	St. Laurent		lawyer
Mariana Beauchamp Jodoin	QC (Saurel)	1953-05-19	1966-06-01	St. Laurent		
Nancy Hodges	BC (Victoria)	1953-11-05	1965-06-12	St. Laurent		journalist
Florence Elsie Inman	PE (Murray Harbour)	1955-07-28	1986-05-31	St. Laurent		director
Olive Lillian Irvine	MB (Lisgar)	1960-01-14	1969-11-01	Diefenbaker		teacher
Josie Quart	QC (Victoria)	1960-11-16	1980-04-17	Diefenbaker		volunteer worker
Mary Elizabeth Kinnear	ON (Welland)	1967-04-06	1973-04-03	Pearson		shipper, clerk
Ann Bell (Heath)	BC (Nanaimo-Malaspina)	1970-10-07	1989-11-29	Trudeau		director
Thérèse Casgrain	QC (Mille Isles)	1970-10-07	1971-07-10	Trudeau		lecturer, journalist, humanist
Renaude Lapointe	QC (Mille Isles)	1971-11-10	1987-01-03	Trudeau		journalist
Margaret Norrie	NS (Colchester-Cumberland)	1972-04-27	1980-10-16	Trudeau		farmer, professor (assistant) - biology
Joan Neiman	ON (Peel)	1972-09-01	1995-09-09	Trudeau		lawyer
Margaret Jean Anderson	NB (Northumberland-Miramichi)	1978-03-23	1990-08-07	Trudeau		businesswoman
Florence Bayard Bird	ON (Carleton)	1978-03-23	1983-01-15	Trudeau		broadcaster, author, journalist
Dalia Wood	QC (Montarville)	1979-03-26	1999-01-31	Trudeau		real estate broker, businesswoman
Yvette Boucher Rousseau	QC (De Salaberry)	1979-03-27	1988-03-17	Trudeau		professor, union staff member, author
Martha Bielish	AB (Lakeland)	1979-09-27	1990-09-26	Clark		farmer, teacher
Anne Cools	ON (Toronto Centre -York)	1984-01-13	2018-08-11	Trudeau	First black member; Longest serving member of the Senate	community-development worker, administrator
Lorna Marsden	ON (Toronto-Taddle Creek)	1984-01-24	1992-08-31	Trudeau		professor of sociology
Joyce Fairbairn	AB (Lethbridge)	1984-06-29	2013-01-18	Trudeau	First woman to serve as Leader of the Government of the Senate	journalist
Brenda Robertson	NB (Riverview)	1984-12-21	2004-05-23	Mulroney		businesswoman
Ethel Cochrane	NL	1986-11-17	2012-09-23	Mulroney		professor - community college, reading specialist, school principal, teacher
Eileen Rossiter	PE	1986-11-17	2004-07-14	Mulroney		realtor
Mira Spivak	MB	1986-11-17	2009-07-12	Mulroney		educator, businesswoman
Solange Chaput-Rolland	QC (Mille Isles)	1988-09-26	1994-05-14	Mulroney		commentator, journalist, writer
Pat Carney	BC	1990-08-30	2008-01-31	Mulroney		economist, economic consultant, journalist
Nancy Teed	NB (Saint John)	1990-08-30	1993-01-29	Mulroney		interior decorator, personnel consultant, businesswoman
Mabel DeWare	NB (Moncton)	1990-09-23	2001-08-09	Mulroney		volunteer worker, dental assistant
Janis Johnson	MB	1990-09-27	2016-09-27	Mulroney		public affairs consultant, political officer
Thérèse Lavoie-Roux	QC (Acadie)	1990-09-27	2001-03-12	Mulroney		professor, social worker, therapist
Raynell Andreychuk	SK	1993-03-11	2019-08-13	Mulroney		judge, ambassador, lawyer
Erminie Cohen	NB (Saint John)	1993-06-04	2001-07-23	Mulroney		businesswoman
Marjory LeBreton	ON	1993-06-18	2015-07-04	Mulroney		senior political adviser, administrative supervisor
Lise Bacon	QC (De la Durantaye)	1994-09-15	2009-08-25	Chrétien		administrator
Sharon Carstairs	MB	1994-09-15	2011-10-17	Chrétien		teacher
Landon Pearson	ON	1994-09-15	2005-11-16	Chrétien		editor, author
Céline Hervieux-Payette	QC (Bedford)	1995-03-21	2016-04-22	Chrétien		director of public relations, lawyer, administrator, businesswoman
Rose-Marie Losier-Cool	NB (Tracadie)	1995-03-21	2012-06-18	Chrétien		teacher
Doris Margaret Anderson	PE (St. Peter's, Kings County)	1995-09-21	1997-07-05	Chrétien		professor, nutritionist
Marie Charette-Poulin	ON (Northern Ontario)	1995-09-21	2015-04-17	Chrétien		lecturer, broadcasting executive, public servant, researcher, executive
Lorna Milne	ON (Peel County)	1995-09-21	2009-12-13	Chrétien		genealogist, lecturer, author, businesswoman
Shirley Maheu	QC (Rougemont)	1996-02-01	2006-02-01	Chrétien		insurance broker, administrator
Jean Forest	AB (Edmonton)	1996-05-16	1998-08-28	Chrétien		businesswoman, teacher
Lucie Pépin	QC (Shawinigan)	1997-04-08	2011-09-07	Chrétien		registered nurse
Peggy Butts	NS	1997-09-22	1999-08-15	Chrétien		social activist, educator, cleric
Catherine Callbeck	PE	1997-09-22	2014-07-25	Chrétien		businesswoman
Marisa Ferretti Barth	QC (Repentigny)	1997-09-22	2006-04-28	Chrétien		social worker
Thelma Chalifoux	AB	1997-11-26	2004-02-08	Chrétien		educator
Joan Cook	NL	1998-03-06	2009-10-06	Chrétien		volunteer worker, businesswoman
Marian Maloney	ON (Surprise Lake, Thunder Bay, North Western Ontario)	1998-06-11	1999-08-16	Chrétien		community-development worker, public relations officer, organizer of events, fundraiser
Lois Wilson	ON (Toronto)	1998-06-11	2002-04-08	Chrétien		author, minister
Joan Fraser	QC (De Lorimier)	1998-09-17	2018-02-02	Chrétien		journalist
Vivienne Poy	ON (Toronto)	1998-09-17	2012-09-17	Chrétien	First Senator of Asian ancestry	author, fashion designer, entrepreneur
Sheila Finestone	QC (Montarville)	1999-08-11	2002-01-28	Chrétien		political analyst, administrator
Ione Christensen	YK	1999-09-02	2006-12-31	Chrétien		judge, public servant
Isobel Finnerty	ON	1999-09-02	2005-07-15	Chrétien		political activist, medical secretary
Jane Cordy	NS	2000-06-09	2024-11-18	Chrétien		teacher
Betty Kennedy	ON	2000-06-20	2001-01-04	Chrétien		broadcaster, author, journalist
Libbe Hubley	PE	2001-03-08	2017-09-07	Chrétien		politician
Mobina Jaffer	BC	2001-06-13	2024-08-19	Chrétien	First South Asian woman appointed to the Senate	solicitor, barrister, lawyer
Viola Léger	NB (Acadie)	2001-06-13	2005-06-29	Chrétien		actress, drama teacher, artistic director
Maria Chaput	MB	2002-12-12	2016-02-29	Chrétien		consultant, businesswoman
Pana Merchant	SK	2002-12-12	2017-03-31	Chrétien		businesswoman, teacher
Madeleine Plamondon	QC (The Laurentides)	2003-09-09	2006-09-21	Chrétien		consumer advocate
Marilyn Trenholme Counsell	NB	2003-09-09	2008-10-22	Chrétien		nutritionist, physician
Lillian Dyck	SK	2005-03-24	2020-08-23	Martin		activist, professor, dean (associate), scientist, researcher, neurochemist
Elaine McCoy	AB	2005-03-24	2020-12-29	Martin		lawyer
Nancy Ruth	ON (Cluny)	2005-03-24	2017-01-05	Martin		activist, administrator
Claudette Tardif	AB	2005-03-24	2018-02-02	Martin		professor, educational administrator, dean, teacher
Andrée Champagne	QC (Grandville)	2005-08-02	2014-07-17	Martin		radio & tv announcer & producer, public relations officer, actress, administrator, writer
Sandra Lovelace Nicholas	NB	2005-09-21	2023-01-31	Martin		activist, carpenter, health care provider, administrator
Nicole Eaton	ON	2009-01-02	2020-01-20	Harper		trustee, director, columnist
Nancy Greene Raine	BC (Thompson-Okanagan-Kootenay)	2009-01-02	2018-05-10	Harper		athlete, director
Suzanne Fortin-Duplessis	QC (Rougemont)	2009-01-14	2015-06-30	Harper		teacher
Linda Frum	ON	2009-08-27	2021-08-27	Harper		author, journalist, columnist
Carolyn Stewart-Olsen	NB	2009-08-27	2021-07-26	Harper		registered nurse, communications director
JoAnne Buth	MB	2012-01-06	2014-08-10	Harper		president / manager
Asha Seth	ON	2012-01-06	2014-12-15	Harper		gynaecologist, obstetrician
Betty Unger	AB	2012-01-06	2018-08-20	Harper		registered nurse, businesswoman
Diane Bellemare	QC (Alma)	2012-09-06	2024-10-12	Harper		professor, economist, executive manager
Lynn Beyak	ON	2013-01-25	2021-01-25	Harper		business owner
Frances Lankin	ON	2016-04-01	2024-10-20	Trudeau, J.		social activist, union officer, chief executive officer
Ratna Omidvar	ON	2016-04-01	2024-11-04	Trudeau, J.		professor, executive director
Patricia Bovey	MB	2016-11-10	2023-05-14	Trudeau, J.		curator, historian, arts consultant
Renée Dupuis	QC (The Laurentides)	2016-11-10	2024-01-16	Trudeau, J.		author, lawyer, human rights consultant
Diane Griffin	PE	2016-11-10	2022-03-17	Trudeau, J.		professor, environmental consultant, senior public servant
Nancy Hartling	NB	2016-11-10	2025-01-31	Trudeau, J.		executive director, lecturer, social worker
Josée Forest-Niesing	ON	2018-10-11	2021-11-20	Trudeau, J.		lawyer
Judith Keating	NB	2020-01-30	2021-07-15	Trudeau, J.		lawyer, public servant
Judith Seidman	QC (De la Durantaye)	2009-08-27	2025-09-01	Harper		consultant, educator, social worker, epidemiologist, researcher
Marie-Françoise Mégie	QC (Rougemont)	2016-11-25	2025-09-21	Trudeau, J.		professor, physician

== Current women senators ==
The following women are currently serving in the Senate of Canada. This table follows the structure used in the List of current senators of Canada.

Current Women Senators of Canada
Name	Province or Territory (Senate Division)	Date Appointed	Mandatory Retirement Date	Appointed on the advice of	Notes or Titles	Other Professions
Pierrette Ringuette	NB	2002-12-12	2030-12-31	Chrétien	Speaker pro tempore	professor, lecturer, businesswoman
Yonah Martin	BC	2009-01-02	2040-04-11	Harper		educator, community activist
Pamela Wallin	SK	2009-01-02	2028-04-10	Harper		journalist, entrepreneur, corporate director, chancellor emeritus, diplomat
Elizabeth Marshall	NL	2010-01-29	2026-09-07	Harper		senior public servant, chartered accountant, auditor
Rose-May Poirier	NB (Saint-Louis-de-Kent)	2010-02-28	2029-03-02	Harper		sales manager, insurance agent, businesswoman
Salma Ataullahjan	ON (Toronto)	2010-07-09	2027-04-29	Harper		activist, realtor, artist
Josée Verner	QC (Montarville)	2011-06-13	2034-12-30	Harper		executive assistant, political adviser
Denise Batters	SK	2013-01-25	2045-06-18	Harper		lawyer
Raymonde Gagné	MB	2016-04-01	2031-01-07	Trudeau, J.	Speaker of the Senate	school superintendent, university president, educational administrator, teacher
Chantal Petitclerc	QC (Grandville)	2016-04-01	2044-12-15	Trudeau, J.	Chair of ISG Deliberations	athlete, lecturer
Wanda Thomas Bernard	NS	2016-11-10	2028-08-01	Trudeau, J.		educator, community activist, social worker, researcher
Gwen Boniface	ON	2016-11-10	2030-08-05	Trudeau, J.		educator, lawyer, police chief
Marilou McPhedran	MB	2016-11-10	2026-07-22	Trudeau, J.		educator, advocate (human rights), lawyer
Lucie Moncion	ON	2016-11-10	2033-10-25	Trudeau, J.		chief executive officer
Kim Pate	ON	2016-11-10	2034-11-10	Trudeau, J.		lawyer, human rights consultant, teacher
Raymonde Saint-Germain	QC (De la Vallière)	2016-11-25	2026-10-07	Trudeau, J.	Facilitator of the ISG	senior public servant
Rosa Galvez	QC (Bedford)	2016-12-06	2036-06-21	Trudeau, J.		professor, environmental consultant
Mary Coyle	NS	2017-12-04	2029-11-05	Trudeau, J.		development consultant, executive director
Mary Jane McCallum	MB	2017-12-04	2027-05-01	Trudeau, J.		dental therapist, professor (assistant)
Marty Deacon	ON (Waterloo Region)	2018-02-15	2033-04-23	Trudeau, J.		educator
Yvonne Boyer	ON	2018-03-15	2028-10-25	Trudeau, J.	First Indigenous woman from Ontario appointed to the Senate	lawyer, professor
Donna Dasko	ON	2018-06-06	2026-08-19	Trudeau, J.		pollster, sociologist, media commentator, businesswoman
Julie Miville-Dechêne	QC (Inkerman)	2018-06-20	2034-07-10	Trudeau, J.		journalist, senior public servant
Bev Busson	BC	2018-09-24	2026-08-23	Trudeau, J.		police officer
Patti LaBoucane-Benson	AB	2018-10-03	2044-02-20	Trudeau, J.	Deputy Gov. Representative	research director, lecturer, author
Paula Simons	AB	2018-10-03	2039-09-07	Trudeau, J.		columnist, author
Dawn Anderson	NT	2018-12-12	2042-04-14	Trudeau, J.		public servant
Pat Duncan	YK	2018-12-12	2035-04-08	Trudeau, J.		consultant, public servant
Rosemary Moodie	ON	2018-12-12	2031-11-24	Trudeau, J.		neonatologist, clinical teacher, professor
Bernadette Clement	ON	2021-06-22	2040-05-17	Trudeau, J.	Deputy Facilitator of the ISG	lawyer
Michèle Audette	QC (De Salaberry)	2021-07-29	2046-07-20	Trudeau, J.	Liaison (whip) of the PSG	consultant
Amina Gerba	QC (Rigaud)	2021-07-29	2036-03-14	Trudeau, J.	PSG Caucus Chair and Deputy Liaison (whip)	businesswoman
Karen Sorensen	AB	2021-07-29	2034-05-20	Trudeau, J.		community leader, mayor
Gigi Osler	MB	2022-09-27	2043-09-09	Trudeau, J.		surgeon, professor
Margo Greenwood	BC	2022-11-10	2028-09-02	Trudeau, J.		professor, doctor, author
Sharon Burey	ON	2022-11-21	2032-12-04	Trudeau, J.		pediatrician, physician
Rebecca Patterson	ON	2022-11-21	2040-06-15	Trudeau, J.	Deputy Leader of the CSG	military officer, nurse, director general
Jane MacAdam	PE	2023-05-03	2032-03-01	Trudeau, J.		auditor, accountant
Iris Petten	NL	2023-05-03	2034-02-05	Trudeau, J.		entrepreneur, community volunteer, senior executive
Judy White	NL	2023-07-07	2039-01-11	Trudeau, J.		public servant, lawyer
Joan Kingston	NB	2023-10-31	2030-01-08	Trudeau, J.		nurse
Krista Ross	NB	2023-10-31	2042-09-30	Trudeau, J.		community leader, Business Person
Marnie McBean	ON	2023-12-20	2043-01-28	Trudeau, J.		athlete, author
Paulette Senior	ON	2023-12-20	2036-12-04	Trudeau, J.		community leader, executive director
Mary Robinson	PE	2024-01-22	2045-08-03	Trudeau, J.		business executive, managing partner
Manuelle Oudar	QC (La Salle)	2024-02-13	2038-07-05	Trudeau, J.		lawyer, senior public servant, board director
Tracy Muggli	SK	2024-08-16	2040-09-18	Trudeau, J.		social worker, executive
Suze Youance	QC (Lauzon)	2024-09-25	2045-08-11	Trudeau, J.		engineer, teacher, researcher, television host
Nancy Karetak-Lindell	NU	2024-12-19	2032-12-10	Trudeau, J.		financial comptroller
Martine Hébert	QC (Victoria)	2025-02-07	2040-10-07	Trudeau, J.		economist, diplomat, public servant
Danièle Henkel	QC (Alma)	2025-02-14	2031-01-16	Trudeau, J.		businesswoman, author, political adviser
Dawn Arnold	NB	2025-03-07	2041-04-23	Trudeau, J.		administrator, mayor, executive, city councillor
Katherine Hay	ON	2025-03-07	2036-01-16	Trudeau, J.		director
Farah Mohamed	ON	2025-03-07	2045-07-05	Trudeau, J.		public speaker, advocate, chief executive officer
Sandra Pupatello	ON	2025-03-07	2037-10-06	Trudeau, J.		politician
Geeta Tucker	QC	2026-07-07		Carney		accountant

== See also ==
List of women elected to Canadian Parliament
