= 45th Canadian Parliament =

Legislative session starting in 2025

- Minority parliament (until April 8, 2026); Majority parliament (since April 8, 2026)
- May. 26, 2025 – present
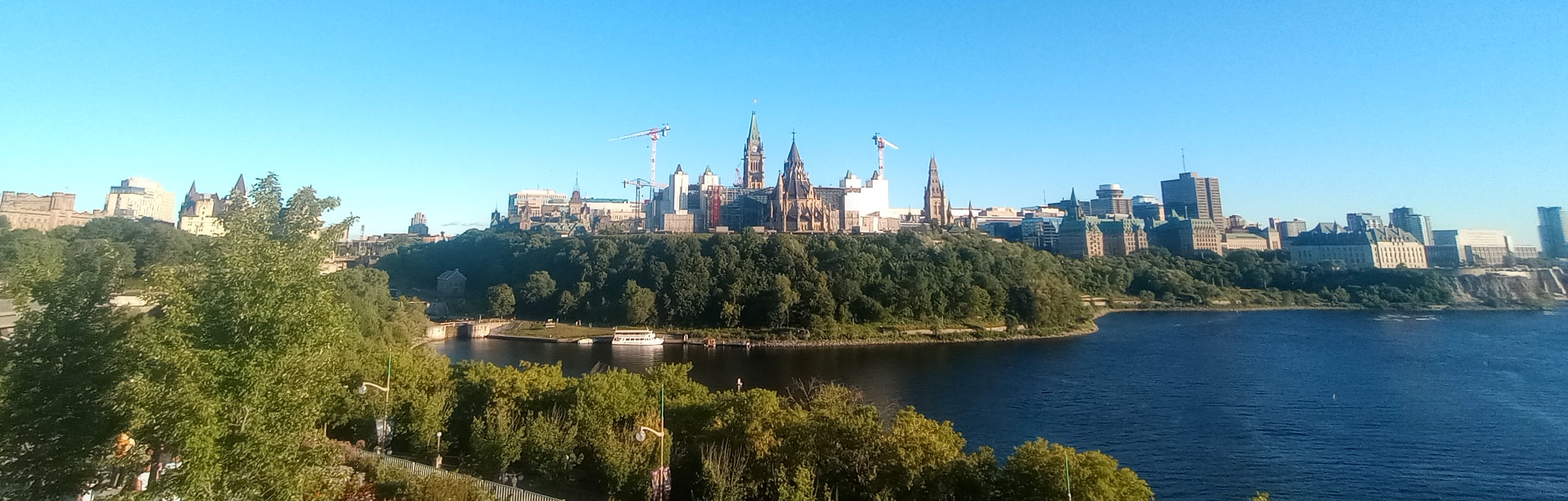
- Canadian Parliament (2025)

Parliament leaders
- Prime minister: Rt. Hon. Mark Carney; Mar. 14, 2025 – present
- Cabinet: 30th Canadian Ministry
- Leader of the Opposition: Hon. Andrew Scheer; May. 6, 2025 – Aug. 18, 2025
- Hon. Pierre Poilievre; Aug. 18, 2025 – present

Party caucuses
- Government: Liberal Party
- Opposition: Conservative Party
- Recognized: Bloc Québécois
- Independent Senators Group*
- Canadian Senators Group*
- Progressive Senate Group*
- Unrecognized: New Democratic Party
- Green Party
- * Only in the Senate.

House of Commons
- Seating arrangements of the House of Commons
- Speaker of the Commons: Hon. Francis Scarpaleggia; May. 26, 2025 – present
- Government House leader: Hon. Steven MacKinnon; May. 13, 2025 – present
- Opposition House leader: Hon. Andrew Scheer; Sep. 13, 2022 – present
- Members: 343 MP seats List of members

Senate
- Seating arrangements of the Senate
- Speaker of the Senate: Hon. Raymonde Gagné; May. 16, 2023 – present
- Government Senate rep.: Hon. Marc Gold; Jan. 24, 2020 – Jun. 30, 2025
- Hon. Pierre Moreau; Nov. 14, 2026 – present
- Opposition Senate leader: Hon. Leo Housakos; May. 14, 2025 – present
- Senators: 105 senator seats List of senators

Sovereign
- Monarch: HM Charles III; Sep. 8, 2022 – present
- Governor general: HE Rt. Hon. Mary Simon; Jul. 26, 2021 – Jun. 8, 2026
- HE Rt. Hon. Louise Arbour; Jun. 8, 2026 – present

Sessions
- 1st session 26 May 2025 – Present
← 44th

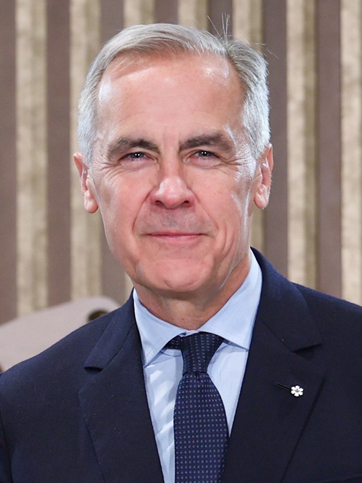
Mark Carney has been Prime Minister and leader of the Liberal Party since the start of the 45th Canadian Parliament.

The 45th Canadian Parliament is the current legislative session of the Parliament of Canada, which began on May 26, 2025, with the membership of the House of Commons determined by the results of the 2025 federal election held on April 28.

== Overview ==
Canada's constitution mandates reviews of electoral divisions following each decennial census to reflect changes and movements in population. This parliament is the first one seated in accordance with the 2023 representation orders determined based on the 2021 census, which expanded the House of Commons by five seats (1 in British Columbia, 3 in Alberta, and 1 in Ontario).

The session was opened personally by Charles III, King of Canada, on May 27, 2025, during his first royal visit to Canada as King. This was the first time in over half a century that the reigning monarch opened parliament, since Elizabeth II did so for the 23rd Canadian Parliament in 1957, as well as the first time the sovereign had personally read the Speech from the Throne since Elizabeth II did so at the opening of the third session of the 30th Canadian Parliament in 1977. The legislative session commenced on May 26, 2025, with the unprecedented event of a prime minister taking a seat in parliament for the first time, and within a year became the first government to obtain a majority through party defections and by-elections.

=== Sessions ===
The 45th Parliament is currently in its first session:

Session	Start	End
1st	May 26, 2025	In process

== Party standings ==
Standings in the 45th Canadian Parliament
Affiliation	House members			Senate members		
Affiliation	2025 election results	Oct. 2026	+/–	On election day 2025	Oct. 2026	+/–
Liberal	169	173	▲4	–	–	Steady
Conservative	144	137	▼7	12	13	▲1
Bloc Québécois	22	21	▼1	–	–	Steady
New Democratic	7	5	▼2	–	–	Steady
Green	1	1	Steady	–	–	Steady
Independent Senators Group	–	–	Steady	45	37	▼8
Canadian Senators Group	–	–	Steady	18	15	▼3
Progressive Senate Group	–	–	Steady	18	17	▼1
Government Representative’s Office	–	–	Steady	–	5	▲5
Independent or non-affiliated	–	–	Steady	12	5	▼7
Total members	343	337		105	93	
Vacant	0	6	▲6	0	12	▲12
Total seats	343			105		
* As of 23 September 2026

== Legislation and motions ==
=== Acts which received royal assent ===
Date of Assent	Short Title	Long Title	Chapter	Bill #
June 26, 2025	—N/a	An Act to amend the Department of Foreign Affairs, Trade and Development Act (supply management)	2025, c. 1	C-202
June 26, 2025	One Canadian Economy Act	An Act to enact the Free Trade and Labour Mobility in Canada Act and the Building Canada Act	2025, c. 2	C-5
June 26, 2025	Appropriation Act No. 1, 2025–26	An Act for granting to His Majesty certain sums of money for the federal public administration for the fiscal year ending March 31, 2026	2025, c. 3	C-6
June 26, 2025	Appropriation Act No. 2, 2025–26	An Act for granting to His Majesty certain sums of money for the federal public administration for the fiscal year ending March 31, 2026	2025, c. 4	C-7
November 20, 2025	—N/a	An Act to amend the Citizenship Act (2025)	2025, c. 5	C-3
November 20, 2025	—N/a	An Act to authorize Gore Mutual Insurance Company to apply to be continued as a body corporate under the laws of the Province of Quebec	—N/a	S-1001
December 11, 2025	Appropriation Act No. 3, 2025–26	An Act for granting to His Majesty certain sums of money for the federal public administration for the fiscal year ending March 31, 2026	2025, c. 6	C-17
February 12, 2026	Canada Groceries and Essentials Benefit Act	An Act to amend the Income Tax Act	2026, c. 1	C-19
March 12, 2026	Making Life More Affordable for Canadians Act	An Act respecting certain affordability measures for Canadians and another measure	2026, c. 2	C-4
March 26, 2026	Budget 2025 Implementation Act, No. 1	An Act to implement certain provisions of the budget tabled in Parliament on November 4, 2025	2026, c. 3	C-15
March 26, 2026	Strengthening Canada's Immigration System and Borders Act	An Act respecting certain measures relating to the security of Canada's borders and the integrity of the Canadian immigration system and respecting other related security measures	2026, c. 4	C-12
March 26, 2026	Appropriation Act No. 4, 2025-26	An Act for granting to His Majesty certain sums of money for the federal public administration for the fiscal year ending March 31, 2026	2026, c. 5	C-23
March 26, 2026	Appropriation Act No. 1, 2026-27	An Act for granting to His Majesty certain sums of money for the federal public administration for the fiscal year ending March 31, 2027	2026, c. 6	C-24
May 6, 2026	—N/a	An Act to implement the Protocol on the Accession of the United Kingdom of Great Britain and Northern Ireland to the Comprehensive and Progressive Agreement for Trans-Pacific Partnership	2026, c. 7	C-13
May 6, 2026	Canada-Indonesia Comprehensive Economic Partnership Agreement Implementation Act	An Act to implement the Comprehensive Economic Partnership Agreement between Canada and Indonesia	2026, c. 8	C-18
June 15, 2026	—N/a	An Act respecting cyber security, amending the Telecommunications Act and making consequential amendments to other Acts	2026, c. 9	C-8
June 15, 2026	—N/a	An Act to amend the Criminal Code (sterilization procedures)	2026, c. 10	S-228
June 15, 2026	Bail and Sentencing Reform Act	An Act to amend the Criminal Code, the Youth Criminal Justice Act and the National Defence Act (bail and sentencing)	2026, c. 11	C-14
June 17, 2026	—N/a	An Act to amend the Criminal Code	2026, c. 12	C-225
June 17, 2026	Appropriation Act No. 2, 2026-27	An Act for granting to His Majesty certain sums of money for the federal public administration for the fiscal year ending March 31, 2027	2026, c. 13	C-32
June 17, 2026	Appropriation Act No. 3, 2026-27	An Act for granting to His Majesty certain sums of money for the federal public administration for the fiscal year ending March 31, 2027	2026, c. 14	C-33
June 18, 2026	Combatting Hate Act	An Act to amend the Criminal Code (hate propaganda, hate crime and access to religious or cultural places)	2026, c. 15	C-9
June 18, 2026	Military Justice System Modernization Act	An Act to amend the National Defence Act and other Acts	2026, c. 16	C-11
June 18, 2026	Arab Heritage Month Act	An Act respecting Arab Heritage Month	2026, c. 17	S-227
June 18, 2026	Build Canada Homes Act	An Act respecting the establishment of Build Canada Homes	2026, c. 18	C-20
June 18, 2026	Protecting Victims Act	An Act to amend certain Acts in relation to criminal and correctional matters (child protection, gender-based violence, delays and other measures)	2026, c. 19	C-16
June 18, 2026	Strong and Free Elections Act	An Act to amend the Canada Elections Act and to enact An Act to change the names of certain electoral districts, 2026	2026, c. 20	C-25
June 18, 2026	—N/a	An Act to authorize certain payments to be made out of the Consolidated Revenue Fund for the purpose of improving housing supply	2026, c. 21	C-26
June 18, 2026	Spring Economic Update 2026 Implementation Act	An Act to implement certain provisions of the spring economic update tabled in Parliament on April 28, 2026	2026, c. 22	C-30

== Officeholders ==
=== Head of State ===
Office	Portrait	Name	Assumed office	Left office
Sovereign		Charles III	September 8, 2022	Incumbent
Governor General		Mary Simon	July 26, 2021	June 8, 2026
Governor General		Louise Arbour	June 8, 2026	Incumbent

=== Party leadership ===
Party	Photo	Name	Assumed office	Left office
Liberal	Mark Carney	Mark Carney	March 9, 2025	Incumbent
Conservative	Pierre Poilievre	Pierre Poilievre	September 10, 2022	Incumbent
Bloc Québécois		Yves-François Blanchet	January 17, 2019	Incumbent
New Democratic		Don Davies (Interim)	May 5, 2025	March 29, 2026
New Democratic		Avi Lewis	March 29, 2026	Incumbent
Green		Elizabeth May	August 26, 2006	November 4, 2019
Green		Elizabeth May	November 19, 2022	November 14, 2026
Green		Mike Morrice	November 14, 2026	Incumbent

=== House of Commons ===
==== Presiding officer ====
Office	Photo	Party	Officer	Riding	Assumed office	Left office
Speaker of the House of Commons	Francis Scarpaleggia	Liberal	Francis Scarpaleggia	Lac-Saint-Louis	May 26, 2025	Incumbent

==== Government leadership (Liberal) ====
Office	Photo	Officer	Riding	Assumed office	Left office
Leader	Mark Carney	Mark Carney	Nepean	March 9, 2025	Incumbent
House Leader		Steven MacKinnon	Gatineau	May 13, 2025	Incumbent
Chief Whip		Mark Gerretsen	Kingston and the Islands	May 14, 2025	Incumbent
Caucus Chair		James Maloney	Etobicoke—Lakeshore	May 2025	Incumbent
Deputy House Leader		Arielle Kayabaga	London West	June 5, 2025	Incumbent
Deputy Whip		Élisabeth Brière	Sherbrooke	June 5, 2025	Incumbent
Quebec Lieutenant		Steven Guilbeault	Laurier—Sainte-Marie	June 5, 2025	November 27, 2025
Quebec Lieutenant		Joël Lightbound	Louis-Hébert	December 2, 2025	Incumbent

==== Opposition leadership (Conservative) ====
Office	Portrait	Officer	Riding	Assumed office	Left office
Leader	Pierre Poilievre	Pierre Poilievre	Battle River—Crowfoot	September 20, 2022	April 28, 2025
Leader	Pierre Poilievre	Pierre Poilievre	Battle River—Crowfoot	August 18, 2025	Incumbent
Leader	Andrew Scheer	Andrew Scheer	Regina—Qu'Appelle	May 6, 2025	August 18, 2025
Deputy Leaders		Melissa Lantsman	Thornhill	September 20, 2022	Incumbent
Deputy Leaders	Tim Uppal	Tim Uppal	Edmonton Gateway	September 20, 2022	Incumbent
House Leader	Andrew Scheer	Andrew Scheer	Regina—Qu'Appelle	September 13, 2022	Incumbent
Deputy House Leader	Luc Berthold	Luc Berthold	Mégantic—L'Érable—Lotbinière	September 13, 2022	Incumbent
Whip	Chris Warkentin	Chris Warkentin	Grande Prairie	May 21, 2025	Incumbent
Deputy Whip	Rob Moore	Rob Moore	Fundy Royal	May 21, 2025	Incumbent
Question period Coordinator	Eric Duncan	Eric Duncan	Stormont—Dundas—Glengarry	May 21, 2025	Incumbent
Caucus Chair	Scott Reid	Scott Reid	Lanark—Frontenac	September 13, 2022	Incumbent
Caucus Party Liaison	Warren Steinley	Warren Steinley	Regina—Lewvan	May 21, 2025	Incumbent
Committee Coordinator	John Brassard	John Brassard	Barrie South—Innisfil	May 21, 2025	Incumbent
Quebec Lieutenant	Pierre Paul-Hus	Pierre Paul-Hus	Charlesbourg—Haute-Saint-Charles	September 13, 2022	Incumbent

== House Committees ==
Committee	Chair	Vice Chairs	
Veterans Affairs	Marie-France Lalonde (LPC)	Blake Richards (CPC)	Marie-Hélène Gaudreau (BQ)
Agriculture and Agri-Food	Michael Coteau (LPC)	John Barlow (CPC)	Yves Perron (BQ)
Canadian Heritage	Lisa Hepfner (LPC)	Rachael Thomas (CPC)	Martin Champoux (BQ)
International Trade	Hon. Judy A. Sgro (LPC)	Adam Chambers (CPC)	Simon-Pierre Savard-Tremblay (IND)
Citizenship and Immigration	Julie Dzerowicz (LPC)	Hon. Michelle Rempel Garner (CPC)	Alexis Brunelle-Duceppe (BQ)
Environment and Sustainable Development	Angelo Iacono (LPC)	Ellis Ross (CPC)	Patrick Bonin (BQ)
Access to Information, Privacy, and Ethics	John Brassard (CPC)	Linda Lapointe (LPC)	Luc Thériault (BQ)
Status of Women	Dominique Vien (CPC)	Marilyn Gladu (LPC)	Andréanne Larouche (BQ)
Foreign Affairs and International Development	Hon. Ahmed Hussen (LPC)	Hon. Michael Chong (CPC)	Alexis Brunelle-Duceppe (BQ)
Finance	Hon. Karina Gould (LPC)	Jasraj Singh Hallan (CPC)	Jean-Denis Garon (BQ)
Fisheries and Oceans	Patrick Weiler (LPC)	Mel Arnold (CPC)	Alexis Deschênes (BQ)
Health	Hon. Hedy Fry (LPC)	Dan Mazier (CPC)	Luc Theriault (BQ)
Human Resources, Skills and Social Development and the Status of Persons with Disabilities	Bobby Morrissey (LPC)	Rosemarie Falk (CPC)	Marilène Gill (BQ)
Indigenous and Northern Affairs	Terry Sheehan (LPC)	Jamie Schmale (CPC)	Sebastian Lemire (BQ)
Industry and Technology	Ben Carr (LPC)	Raquel Dancho (CPC)	Gabriel Ste-Marie (BQ)
Justice and Human Rights	Hon. Marc Miller (LPC)	Larry Brock (CPC)	Rhéal Fortin (BQ)
Official Languages	Yvan Baker (LPC)	Joël Godin (CPC)	Mario Beaulieu (BQ)
National Defence	Charles Sousa (LPC)	James Bezan (CPC)	Simon-Pierre Savard-Tremblay (IND)
Government Operations and Estimates	Kelly McCauley (CPC)	Iqwinder Gaheer (LPC)	Marie-Hélène Gaudreau (BQ)
Public Accounts	John Williamson (CPC)	Jean Yip (LPC)	Sébastien Lemire (BQ)
Procedure and House Affairs	Chris Bittle (LPC)	Michael Cooper (CPC)	Christine Normandin (BQ)
Natural Resources	Hon. Terry Duguid (LPC)	Shannon Stubbs (CPC)	Mario Simard (BQ)
Public Safety and National Security	Hon. Jean-Yves Duclos (LPC)	Frank Caputo (CPC)	Claude DeBellefeuille (BQ)
Science and Research	Salma Zahid (LPC)	Tony Baldinelli (CPC)	Maxime Blanchette-Joncas (BQ)
Transport, Infrastructure, and Communities	Peter Schiefke (LPC)	Dan Albas (CPC)	Xavier Barsalou-Duval (BQ)

== Joint Committees ==
Committee	Joint Chairs		Vice Chair (s)	
Library of Parliament	Hon. Mohamed-Iqbal Ravalia (ISG)	MP Angelo Iacono (LPC)	MP Louis Plamondon (BQ)	-
Scrutiny of Regulations	Hon. Yuen Pau Woo (ISG)	MP Dan Albas (CPC)	Tim Louis (LPC)	Denis Trudel (BQ)

== Leadership of the Senate ==
=== Presiding officer ===
Office	Portrait	Party	Officer	Province	Assumed office	Left office
Speaker of the Senate		Non-affiliated	Raymonde Gagné	Manitoba	May 12, 2023	Incumbent
Speaker pro tempore		Independent Senators Group	René Cormier	New Brunswick	June 5, 2025	Incumbent

=== Government leadership (non-affiliated) ===
Office	Officer	Province	Assumed office	Left office
Government Representative in the Senate	Pierre Moreau	Quebec	July 18, 2025	Incumbent
Legislative Deputy to the Government Representative in the Senate	Patti LaBoucane-Benson	Alberta	May 2023	Incumbent
Government Liaison in the Senate	Iris Petten	Newfoundland and Labrador	September 5, 2024	Incumbent

=== Opposition leadership (Conservative) ===
Office	Portrait	Officer	Province	Assumed office	Left office
Leader of the Opposition		Leo Housakos	Quebec	May 14, 2025	Incumbent
Deputy leader of the Opposition		Yonah Martin	British Columbia	November 4, 2015	Incumbent
Whip of the Opposition		Judith Seidman	Quebec	N/A	September 1, 2025
Caucus Chair		Denise Batters	Saskatchewan	N/A	Incumbent

== Senate Committees ==
Committee	Chair (s)	Deputy Chair (s)
Foreign Affairs and International Relations	Peter M. Boehm (ISG)	Peter Harder (PSG)
Agriculture and Forestry	Robert Black (CSG)	John M. McNair (ISG)
Audit and Oversight	Marty Klyne (PSG)	David M. Wells (CPC); Colin Deacon (CSG); Tony Loffreda (ISG)
Indigenous Peoples	Michèle Audette (PSG)	Margo Greenwood (ISG)
Banking, Commerce, and the Economy	Clément Gignac (CSG)	Toni Varone (ISG)
Internal Economy, Budgets, and Administration	Lucie Moncion (ISG)	Claude Carignan (CPC); Danièle Henkel (PSG); Jim Quinn (CSG)
Ethics and Conflict of Interest for Senators	Judith Seidman (CPC)	Peter Harder (PSG)
Energy, the Environment, and Natural Resources	Pat Duncan (ISG)	Josée Verner (CSG)
Legal and Constitutional Affairs	David Arnot (ISG)	Denise Batters (CPC)
National Finance	Claude Carignan (CPC)	Éric Forest (ISG)
Official Languages	Allister Surette (ISG)	Rose-May Poirier (CPC)
Fisheries and Oceans	Fabian Manning (CPC)	Bev Busson (ISG)
Human Rights	Paulette Senior (ISG)	Wanda Thomas Bernard (PSG)
Rules, Procedures, and Rights of Parliament	Pierre Dalphond (PSG)	Denise Batters (CPC); Stan Kutcher (ISG); Percy Downe (CSG); Pierrette Ringuette (ISG)
National Security, Defence and Veterans Affairs	Hassan Yussuff (ISG)	Mohammad Al Zaibak (CSG)
Selection	Michael L. MacDonald (CPC)	Chantal Petitclerc (ISG)
Social Affairs, Science and Technology	Rosemary Moodie (ISG)	Gigi Osler (CSG)
Transport and Communications	Larry Smith (CPC)	Donna Dasko (ISG)

== Timeline ==
=== Changes in MPs ===
Changes in seats held (2025–present)
Seat	Before			Change				
Seat	Date	Member	Party	Reason	Date	Member	Party	Ref(s)
Battle River—Crowfoot	June 17, 2025	Damien Kurek	█ Conservative	Resigned from parliament to allow Conservative Party leader Pierre Poilievre to run for the seat	August 18, 2025	Pierre Poilievre	█ Conservative	
Acadie—Annapolis	November 4, 2025	Chris d'Entremont	█ Conservative	Resigned from caucus to join the Liberal Party caucus			█ Liberal	
Markham—Unionville	December 11, 2025	Michael Ma	█ Conservative	Resigned from caucus to join the Liberal Party caucus			█ Liberal	
University—Rosedale	January 9, 2026	Chrystia Freeland	█ Liberal	Resigned from parliament to become an economic advisor for Ukraine	April 13, 2026	Danielle Martin	█ Liberal	
Scarborough Southwest	February 2, 2026	Bill Blair	█ Liberal	Resigned from parliament to become the Canadian High Commissioner to the United Kingdom	April 13, 2026	Doly Begum	█ Liberal	
Terrebonne	February 13, 2026	Tatiana Auguste	█ Liberal	2025 result annulled by the Supreme Court	April 13, 2026	Tatiana Auguste	█ Liberal	
Edmonton Riverbend	February 18, 2026	Matt Jeneroux	█ Conservative	Resigned from caucus to join the Liberal Party caucus			█ Liberal	
Nunavut	March 10, 2026	Lori Idlout	█ New Democratic	Resigned from caucus to join the Liberal Party caucus			█ Liberal	
Sarnia—Lambton—Bkejwanong	April 8, 2026	Marilyn Gladu	█ Conservative	Resigned from caucus to join the Liberal Party caucus			█ Liberal	
Rosemont—La Petite-Patrie	April 27, 2026	Alexandre Boulerice	█ New Democratic	Resigned from caucus in preparation to run in the 2026 Quebec general election in Gouin for Quebec solidaire			█ Independent	
Saint-Hyacinthe—Bagot—Acton	May 28, 2026	Simon-Pierre Savard-Tremblay	█ Bloc Québécois	Resigned from caucus in preparation to run in the 2026 Quebec general election in Saint-Hyacinthe for Parti Québécois			█ Independent	
Saint-Hyacinthe—Bagot—Acton	June 19, 2026	Simon-Pierre Savard-Tremblay	█ Independent	Resigned from parliament to run in the 2026 Quebec general election in Saint-Hyacinthe for Parti Québécois	December 7, 2026		█ Vacant	
North Vancouver—Capilano	June 19, 2026	Jonathan Wilkinson	█ Liberal	Resigned from parliament to take up the post of Canadian Ambassador to the European Union.	August 31, 2026	Braeden Caley	█ Liberal	
Chicoutimi—Le Fjord	July 7, 2026	Richard Martel	█ Conservative	Resigned from caucus to accept an appointment to the Senate as an independent.			█ Independent	
Chicoutimi—Le Fjord	July 7, 2026	Richard Martel	█ Independent	Resigned as a member of parliament upon appointment to the Senate.	August 31, 2026	Daniel Gobeil	█ Liberal	
Beaches—East York	July 7, 2026	Nate Erskine-Smith	█ Liberal	Resigned from parliament to run in the 2026 Toronto municipal election for the equivalent ward.	August 31, 2026	Tanveer Shahnawaz	█ Liberal	
Scarborough North	August 15, 2026	Shaun Chen	█ Liberal	Resigned from parliament due to health concerns following a car accident.	December 7, 2026		█ Vacant	
Rosemont—La Petite-Patrie	August 26, 2026	Alexandre Boulerice	█ Independent	Resigned from parliament to run in the 2026 Quebec general election in Gouin for Quebec solidaire	December 7, 2026		█ Vacant	
Laurier—Sainte-Marie	August 28, 2026	Steven Guilbeault	█ Liberal	Resigned from parliament.	December 7, 2026		█ Vacant	
Yorkton—Melville	August 31, 2026	Cathay Wagantall	█ Conservative	Resigned from parliament.	December 7, 2026		█ Vacant	
Brantford—Brant South	September 18, 2026	Larry Brock	█ Conservative	Resigned from parliament to work for the Crown Attorney's office in Brantford.	December 7, 2026		█ Vacant	

=== 2025 ===
- April 28 – In the 45th Canadian federal election, the incumbent Liberal Party wins the most seats in the House of Commons, but fails to reach a majority government.
- May 13 – The new Ministry is sworn in, overseen by Governor General Mary Simon.
- May 26 – Lac-Saint-Louis MP Francis Scarpaleggia is elected Speaker of the House of Commons.
- May 27 – Opening of the 45th Parliament and the Speech from the Throne, delivered by Charles III, King of Canada.
- June 2 – Carney government loses non-binding motion by 166 to 164 that it present a budget before the House of Commons rises for summer vacation on 20 June. Carney and Champagne had announced their plans not to produce a budget before the Speech from the Throne, if not earlier.
- June 5 – Carney government wins approval of motion in support of the Speech from the Throne, without recorded division. The NDP said it planned not to support the motion, but support from the Bloc Québécois had been guaranteed since 29 April.
- June 17 – Conservative MP Damien Kurek for Battle River—Crowfoot resigns his seat to allow Conservative Party leader Pierre Poilievre to run in a by-election.
- August 18 – Conservative leader Pierre Poilievre wins the by-election in Battle River—Crowfoot, holding the seat for the party.
- September 16 – Liberal MP Chrystia Freeland for University—Rosedale resigns from Cabinet and announces that she will not seek re-election at the next federal election. Carney then shuffles his Cabinet.
- November 4 – Conservative MP Chris d'Entremont for Acadie—Annapolis crosses the floor to the Liberal Party in order to support the government's budget.
- November 6 - Conservative MP Matt Jeneroux for Edmonton Riverbend announces his intention to resign his seat in spring 2026.
- November 17 – The federal budget passes by a vote of 170 to 168, with 4 absentions and 1 absence.
- November 27 – Liberal MP Steven Guilbeault for Laurier—Sainte-Marie resigns from Cabinet.
- December 1 – Carney conducts a minor Cabinet shuffle.
- December 11 – Conservative MP Michael Ma for Markham—Unionville crosses the floor to the Liberal Party.

=== 2026 ===
- January 9 – Liberal MP Chrystia Freeland for University—Rosedale resigns her seat to accept the post of an economic advisor for the Ukrainian government.
- February 2 – Liberal MP Bill Blair for Scarborough Southwest resigns his seat to accept the post of Canadian High Commissioner to the United Kingdom.
- February 13 – The Supreme Court of Canada nullifies the 2025 election result in Terrebonne, leaving the seat vacant and triggering a future by-election
- February 18 – Conservative MP Matt Jeneroux for Edmonton Riverbend announces he no longer plans to resign his seat, and instead crosses the floor to the Liberal Party.
- March 10 – New Democratic MP Lori Idlout for Nunavut crosses the floor to the Liberal Party.
- March 29 – Avi Lewis is elected leader of the New Democratic Party of Canada. As he doesn't have a seat in the House of Commons, Don Davies continues as parliamentary leader.
- April 8 – Conservative MP Marilyn Gladu for Sarnia—Lambton—Bkejwanong crosses the floor to the Liberal Party.
- April 13 – Liberal candidates Doly Begum, Tatiana Auguste, and Danielle Martin win their respective by-elections in Scarborough Southwest, Terrebonne, and University—Rosedale, giving the party a majority government.
- April 27 – New Democratic MP Alexandre Boulerice for Rosemont—La Petite-Patrie resigns from caucus to sit as an independent while he runs in the 2026 Quebec general election in Gouin for Quebec solidaire.
- May 28 – Bloc Québécois MP Simon-Pierre Savard-Tremblay for Saint-Hyacinthe—Bagot—Acton resigns from caucus to sit as an independent while he runs in the 2026 Quebec general election in Saint-Hyacinthe for Parti Québécois.
- June 19 – Independent MP Simon-Pierre Savard-Tremblay for Saint-Hyacinthe—Bagot—Acton resigns his seat to run in the 2026 Quebec general election in Saint-Hyacinthe for Parti Québécois.
- June 19 – Liberal MP Jonathan Wilkinson for North Vancouver—Capilano resigns his seat to become Canadian ambassador to the European Union.
- July 7 – Conservative MP Richard Martel for Chicoutimi—Le Fjord resigns his seat in the House of Commons in order to accept an appointment to the Senate.
- July 7 – Liberal MP Nathaniel Erskine-Smith for Beaches—East York resigns his seat in the House of Commons to run for Toronto City Council.
- August 15 – Liberal MP Shaun Chen for Scarborough North resigns his seat.
- August 26 – Independent MP Alexandre Boulerice for Rosemont—La Petite-Patrie resigns his seat to run in the 2026 Quebec general election in Gouin for Quebec solidaire.
- August 28 – Liberal MP Steven Guilbeault for Laurier—Sainte-Marie resigns his seat.
- August 31 – Conservative MP Cathay Wagantall for Yorkton—Melville resigns her seat.
- August 31 – Liberal candidates Braeden Caley, Daniel Gobeil, and Tanveer Shahnawaz win their respective by-elections in North Vancouver—Capilano, Chicoutimi—Le Fjord, and Beaches—East York.
- September 18 – The resignation of Conservative MP Larry Brock for Brantford—Brant South took effect.
- November 14 – Mike Morrice becomes leader of the Green Party of Canada. As he does not have a seat in the House of Commons, Elizabeth May continues as parliamentary leader.

=== Membership changes ===
==== House of Commons ====
Number of members per party by date	2025					2026															
Number of members per party by date	Apr 28	Jun 17	Aug 18	Nov 4	Dec 11	Jan 9	Feb 2	Feb 13	Feb 18	Mar 10	Apr 8	Apr 13	Apr 27	May 28	Jun 19	Jul 7	Aug 15	Aug 25	Aug 28	Aug 31	Sep 18
Liberal	169			170	171	170	169	168	169	170	171	174			173	172	171		170	173	
Conservative	144	143	144	143	142				141		140					139				138	137
Bloc Québécois	22													21							
New Democratic	7									6			5								
Green	1																				
Independent	0												1	2	1			0			
Total members	343	342	343			342	341	340				343			341	339	338	337	336	338	337
Government majority	–5	–4	–5	–3	–1	–2	–3	–4	–2	0	+2	+5					+4	+5	+4	+8	+9
Vacant	0	1	0			1	2	3				0			2	4	5	6	7	5	6

==== Senate ====
Senate group changes during 45th Parliament
Date	ISG	CSG	PSG	CPC	NA	Vac.	Tot.
2025-04-28	45	18	18	12	12	0	105
2025-05-13	45	19	18	12	11	0	105
2025-05-14	45	19	18	11	11	1	105
2025-05-20	45	20	18	11	10	1	105
2025-05-26	45	21	18	11	9	1	105
2025-06-03	46	21	18	11	8	1	105
2025-06-04	46	21	18	12	7	1	105
2025-06-10	46	21	18	13	6	1	105
2025-06-11	46	20	18	14	6	1	105
2025-06-30	46	20	18	14	5	2	105
2025-07-18	46	20	17	14	6	2	105
2025-08-01	45	20	18	14	6	2	105
2025-09-01	45	20	18	13	6	3	105
2025-09-05	46	20	17	13	6	3	105
2025-09-09	45	20	17	13	6	4	105
2025-09-21	44	20	17	13	6	5	105
2025-09-23	43	20	17	13	7	5	105
2025-09-25	43	19	17	13	8	5	105
2025-10-09	43	19	16	14	8	5	105
2025-10-17	43	19	16	13	8	6	105
2025-11-15	42	19	16	13	8	7	105
2026-03-18	41	19	17	13	8	7	105
2026-03-23	41	19	17	12	8	8	105
2026-04-28	41	19	17	11	8	9	105
2026-05-24	40	19	17	11	8	10	105
2026-07-08	40	18	17	12	8	10	105
2026-07-09	40	18	17	12	10	8	105
2026-07-22	40	18	17	12	9	9	105
2026-07-24	40	18	17	12	10	8	105
2026-07-31	40	17	17	12	10	9	105
2026-08-09	40	16	17	12	10	10	105
2026-08-19	39	16	17	12	10	11	105
2026-08-23	38	16	17	12	10	12	105
2026-09-18	38	16	17	12	11	11	105
2026-10-07	37	16	17	12	11	12	105
2026-10-18	37	15	17	12	11	13	105

== See also ==
- 2025 Speech from the Throne
- Official Opposition Shadow Cabinet of the 45th Parliament of Canada
- Women in the 45th Canadian Parliament
