= Tony Dean (Canadian politician) =

Canadian public servant

The Honourable Tony Dean OOnt

Deputy Facilitator of the Independent Senators Group
- In office 1 January 2022 – 24 June 2023
- Leader: Raymonde Saint-Germain
- Preceded by: Raymonde Saint-Germain
- Succeeded by: Bernadette Clement

Canadian Senator from Ontario
- Incumbent
- Assumed office 10 November 2016
- Nominated by: Justin Trudeau
- Appointed by: David Johnston

Personal details
- Born: 19 August 1953 (age 72) Birmingham, England, United Kingdom
- Party: Independent Senators Group
- Profession: Academic

Anthony Alexander Dean, OOnt (born 19 August 1953) is a Canadian politician and civil servant. He was secretary of the Cabinet, head of the Ontario Public Service and the clerk of the Executive Council from 2002 to 2008.

== Background ==
Dean received a Bachelor of Arts degree in sociology and social anthropology from University of Hull and a Master of Arts degree in sociology from McMaster University. He worked for ten years in the public sector in collective bargaining before joining the Ontario Public Service in 1989. He was Deputy Minister of Labour and Deputy Minister and Associate Secretary of Cabinet, Policy. In 2002, he was appointed by Ontario Premier Ernie Eves Secretary of the Cabinet and Clerk of the Executive Council.

Dean retired in 2008 and became a professor at the University of Toronto’s Munk School of Global Affairs and Public Policy. He held this role until he was appointed to the Senate of Canada, at which point he became a Distinguished Fellow. In 2010, he was a senior research fellow at the Harvard Kennedy School. He advises governments, domestically and internationally, on public administration, public policy and implementation.

Ontario Premier Dalton McGuinty described him as "the ultimate public servant, exhibiting on a daily basis the drive to get things done, and the diplomacy required to have them done well". In 2009, he was made a member of the Order of Ontario in recognition for having "transformed the Ontario Public Service".

On 31 October 2016, Dean's appointment to the Senate of Canada was announced. He sits as an independent.

Government offices
Preceded by Andromache Karakatsanis	Secretary of the Cabinet, Head of the Ontario Public Service and Clerk of the Executive Council; 30 November 2002 – 7 January 2008	Succeeded by Shelly Jamieson
