= Paul Prosper =

Canadian politician

The Honourable Paul Prosper

Canadian Senator from Nova Scotia
- Incumbent
- Assumed office July 6, 2023
- Nominated by: Justin Trudeau
- Appointed by: Mary Simon
- Preceded by: Tom McInnis

Personal details
- Born: November 4, 1964 (age 61)
- Party: Canadian Senators Group
- Education: Cape Breton University; Dalhousie Law School

Paul James Prosper (born November 4, 1965) is a Canadian politician who has served as a senator from Nova Scotia since July 2023.

== Early life and education ==
Prosper grew up in Paqꞌtnkek First Nation, Nova Scotia. In 1992, he graduated from Cape Breton University with a Bachelor of Arts Degree and in 1994, he graduated from Dalhousie University with a Bachelor of Laws.

== Career ==
After graduation, Prosper worked in different capacities in the Maritime region providing Mi'kmaq legal support and treaty rights.

From 2013 to 2020, Prosper served as Chief of the Paqꞌtnkek First Nation. In September 2020, Prosper was elected Regional Chief of Nova Scotia and Newfoundland with the Assembly of First Nations.

On July 6, 2023, he was summoned to the Senate of Canada by Governor General Mary Simon, on the advice of prime minister Justin Trudeau.
