= Colin Deacon =

Canadian entrepreneur and politician

The Honourable Colin Deacon
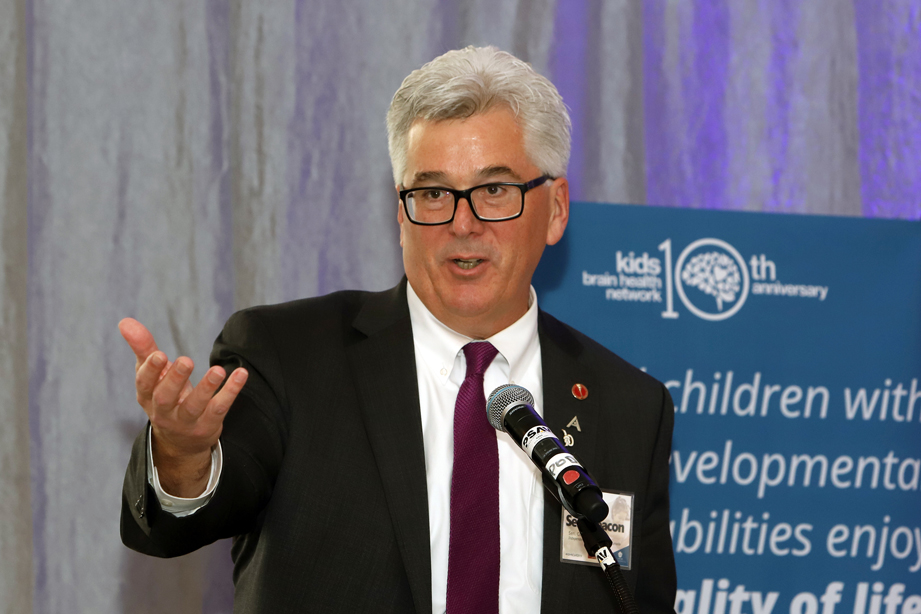

Canadian Senator from Nova Scotia
- Incumbent
- Assumed office June 15, 2018
- Nominated by: Justin Trudeau
- Appointed by: Julie Payette

Personal details
- Born: November 1, 1959 (age 66)
- Party: Canadian Senators Group
- Other political affiliations: Independent Senators Group (2018-2023)
- Education: University of Guelph
- Committees: Standing Senate Committees on Banking, Commerce and the Economy & Agriculture and Forestry
- Website: colindeacon.ca

Colin Deacon (born November 1, 1959) is a Canadian entrepreneur and politician from Halifax, Nova Scotia. He was appointed to the Senate of Canada on June 15, 2018.

== Life and career ==
=== Before the Senate ===
Before his appointment to the Senate, Deacon was an entrepreneur in Halifax, Nova Scotia. From 1997 to 2006, Deacon was the CEO of SpellRead, an evidence-based reading program that taught Canadian and American teachers how to teach reading. He is the founder and former CEO of BlueLight Analytics, which offers technical products to dentists, researchers and dental manufacturers.

Deacon has served as Vice-Chair of the Board of the Kids Brain Health Network and was a member of the board of the Halifax Assistance Fund, which works to help community members in need.

=== Senate of Canada ===
On June 15, 2018, Prime Minister Justin Trudeau announced Deacon's appointment to the Senate of Canada. Deacon was recommended by the Independent Advisory Board for Senate Appointments and was chosen through an open application process based on merit-based criteria requirements under the Constitution of Canada.

Since 2018, Deacon has been a member of the Standing Senate Committees on Banking, Commerce and the Economy, as well as Agriculture and Forestry, and formerly served as Deputy Chair for both committees. He is a member of the Parliamentary Network on the World Bank and International Monetary Fund, and served as Chair of the Canadian Chapter of the Network from 2019 to March 2023.

On July 11, 2023, Deacon joined the Canadian Senators Group.
