= Yuen Pau Woo =

Canadian politician (born 1963)

The Honourable Yuen Pau Woo
- 胡元豹
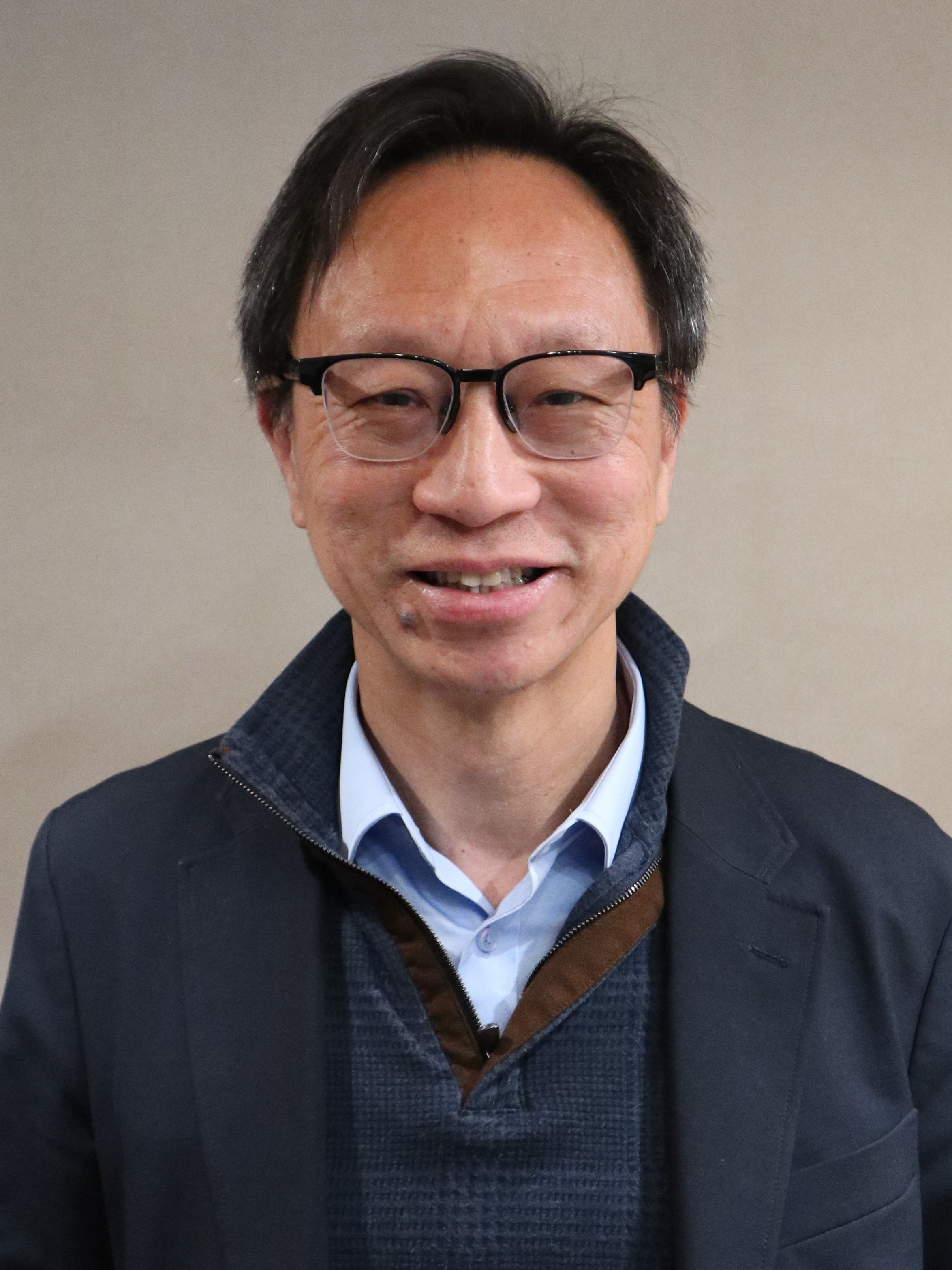
- Woo in 2025

Facilitator of the Independent Senators Group
- In office September 25, 2017 – January 1, 2022
- Deputy: Raymonde Saint-Germain
- Preceded by: Elaine McCoy (interim)
- Succeeded by: Raymonde Saint-Germain

Canadian Senator from British Columbia
- Incumbent
- Assumed office November 10, 2016
- Nominated by: Justin Trudeau
- Appointed by: David Johnston

Personal details
- Born: March 2, 1963 (age 63) Johor Bahru, Federation of Malaya (now Malaysia)
- Party: Independent Senators Group
- Website: www.senatoryuenpauwoo.ca

Yuen Pau Woo (born March 2, 1963) is a Canadian politician who has been a senator from British Columbia since 2016. He is the first Malaysian-born senator, and the inaugural facilitator of the Independent Senators Group (ISG), taking on the role from September 2017 until January 2022. He was also the president and CEO of the Asia Pacific Foundation of Canada, a Vancouver-based think-tank on Canada–Asia relations, until August 11, 2014.

== Background ==
Woo was born in Johor Bahru in 1963, when it was part of the Federation of Malaya (modern-day Malaysia). His family moved to Singapore shortly after. He grew up there, and was educated at Anglo-Chinese School, Wheaton College, Lester B. Pearson College in Canada, and the University of Cambridge and the University of London in the United Kingdom. Woo became a permanent resident of Canada in 1988, married a Canadian settling in Newfoundland.

=== Career ===
Woo has previously worked as a consultant on international marine affairs and as an economist for the Monetary Authority of Singapore and the Government of Singapore Investment Corporation. He has also served on the Standing Committee of the Pacific Economic Cooperation Council and as an adviser to the Canadian Ditchley Foundation, the Shanghai WTO Affairs Consultation Centre and the Asian Development Bank.

In December 2008, Woo was appointed by the premier of British Columbia to the province's Economic Advisory Council.

In 2017, Woo was one of the recipients of the Top 25 Canadian Immigrant Awards, presented by Canadian Immigrant Magazine.

Woo was most recently the president and CEO of the Asia Pacific Foundation of Canada. He is a member of the Greater Vancouver Advisory Board for the Salvation Army, on the Global Council of the Asia Society in New York City, a board member of the Public Policy Forum, the Vancouver Academy of Music and the Mosaic Institute.

He is also on the editorial board of Pacific Affairs. At the time of his appointment to the Senate, Woo was a senior fellow in public policy at the Asian Institute of Research at the University of British Columbia.

=== Areas of research ===
Woo's research focuses on Asia, and Canada's relations with Asia. He publishes papers on topics ranging from Chinese investments to Asian regionalism. He also has written op-ed pieces.

== Political career ==
On October 27, 2016, Woo was named to the Senate of Canada by Prime Minister Justin Trudeau to sit as an independent. He assumed his seat on November 10, 2016. Woo was elected facilitator of the non-partisan Independent Senators Group caucus in the Senate on September 25, 2017.

He was elected joint chair of the Standing Joint Committee on Scrutiny of Regulations in the 45th Canadian Parliament in 2025.

=== Senate statements ===
==== Persecution of Uyghurs in China ====
In a June 2021 statement, Woo opposed a Senate motion to recognize the ongoing persecution of Uyghurs and other Turkic Muslims in China as a genocide and "call upon the International Olympic Committee to move the 2022 Olympic Games if the Chinese government continues this genocide and call on the government to officially adopt this position". While calling the recent treatment of Uyghurs "repressive — perhaps even genocidal — acts", Woo argued that the motion would not "add any actionable measure specific to the [Uyghur] situation in China" and that it was "simply an exercise in labeling". However, he criticized the situation in Xinjiang by drawing parallels with the Canadian Indian residential school system and mentioned that "repression and forced assimilation only lead to longer-term problems for society at large".

==== Detention of Michael Spavor and Michael Kovrig ====
Woo has opined that there could be no resolution to the situation regarding the detention of Michael Spavor and Michael Kovrig without "some recognition and acknowledgment, on the part of the two governments, of the legitimacy of the justice systems of the other side". His statements were criticized by Conservative Senator Leo Housakos, who argued that China's legal system could not be considered "legitimate" "when it can imprison you without charges, [when it's] a system that doesn't disclose what the charges are to you or to your attorney and is a judicial system that is done in closed-door privacy."

==== Foreign influence transparency registry ====
In March 2023, Woo raised "fears about how a foreign influence registry could go very wrong", comparing it to the Chinese Exclusion Act. In an e-mail response to the National Post, Woo "encourage[d] Canadians to reflect on whether a foreign influence transparency registry can be developed in such a way as to not punish or stigmatize certain communities, stifle legitimate political debate, and foster parochialism." Gloria Fung, co-ordinator of the Canadian Coalition for a Foreign Influence Registry, believes that Woo's comments are part of what she considers to be a "very well-orchestrated and co-ordinated effort" to stoke fears that the federal government's intent to investigate foreign agents will contribute to anti-Asian racism. Cheuk Kwan of the Toronto Association for Democracy in China said that Woo's statement was reminiscent of how the Chinese Communist Party (CCP) responds to criticism, "using racism as a deflection from the proper issue at hand."

==== South China Sea ====
Woo has opposed a motion critical of China's construction of artificial islands and military airfields in the South China Sea.

==== 100th Anniversary of the Chinese Exclusion Act ====
Woo co-organized an event marking the 100th anniversary of the passage of the Chinese Exclusion Act by Parliament in the chamber of the Senate of Canada.

==== Jimmy Lai trial ====
In February 2026, Woo commented on the trial of Hong Kong media entrepreneur Jimmy Lai in a post on X (formerly Twitter), stating that, he would have been prosecuted under Canada's Foreign Interference and Security of Information Act. According to Sing Tao Daily, Woo's post drew a response from Conservative Member of Parliament Shuv Majumdar, who criticized the Senator's comments on social media.

=== Canadians United Against Modern Exclusion ===
In 2025, Woo co-founded Canadians United Against Modern Exclusion alongside former Ontario senator Victor Oh and B.C. businessman and broadcaster James Ho. The organization published a critique of Dotting the Map, a platform operated by pro-democracy advocates with Canadian Friends of Hong Kong that monitors organizations linked to the Chinese Communist Party in Canada, accusing it of labeling individuals as "disloyal and threatening to Canada based on their ethnic origin." Woo is himself documented on the Dotting the Map platform.

== Awards ==
Woo received the Chinese Canadian Legends Award in 2018.
