= Tony Loffreda =

Canadian politician

The Honourable Tony Loffreda

Canadian Senator from Quebec (Shawinegan)
- Incumbent
- Assumed office July 22, 2019
- Nominated by: Justin Trudeau
- Appointed by: Julie Payette

Personal details
- Born: August 14, 1962 (age 63)
- Party: Independent Senators Group
- Occupation: Banker

Antonio Loffreda is a Canadian politician and former banker. On July 22, 2019, he was appointed as a Canadian Senator representing the province of Quebec. He previously worked as a Royal Bank of Canada executive in Montreal.

Loffreda is a Certified Public Accountant. He holds a Bachelor of Commerce from Concordia University, where he now serves on the board of governors. He was awarded a Sovereign's Medal for Volunteers for his volunteer work for various health related charities.

On November 7, 2019, Senator Loffreda joined the Independent Senators Group (ISG).
