= Iris Petten =

Canadian senator (born 1959)

The Honourable Iris Petten

Canadian Senator from Newfoundland and Labrador
- Incumbent
- Assumed office May 3, 2023
- Nominated by: Justin Trudeau
- Appointed by: Mary Simon
- Preceded by: Norman Doyle

Government Liaison in the Senate
- Incumbent
- Assumed office September 5, 2024
- Leader: Marc Gold
- Preceded by: Michèle Audette

Personal details
- Born: February 5, 1959 (age 67) Port de Grave, Newfoundland and Labrador, Canada
- Party: Independent Senators Group
- Education: Memorial University of Newfoundland

Iris G. Petten (born February 5, 1959) is a Canadian senator from Newfoundland and Labrador.

== Early life and career ==
Petten was born and raised in Port de Grave, Newfoundland and Labrador. She holds a Bachelor of Arts, a Bachelor of Vocational Education, and an Honorary Doctor of Laws from Memorial University of Newfoundland.

In 1984, she began her career in the fishing industry with Fishery Products International. She was a founding shareholder and served as vice-president of Grand Atlantic Seafoods, a processing company. She later co-founded Ocean Choice International (OCI) in 2000 and remained there until 2008. She served three terms as the chair of the Board of Regents of Memorial University of Newfoundland, from 2013 to 2022.

== Senate ==
She was appointed to the Senate of Canada on May 3, 2023, on the advice of Prime Minister Justin Trudeau. She sits as an independent member of the Senate.
