= Geeta Tucker =

Canadian politician and accountant

The Honourable Geeta Tucker FCPA ICD.D

Canadian Senator from Manitoba
- Incumbent
- Assumed office July 9, 2026
- Nominated by: Mark Carney
- Appointed by: Louise Arbour

Personal details
- Born: May 2, 1971 (age 55)
- Party: Non-affiliated
- Spouse: Mike Tucker
- Education: University of Waterloo
- Occupation: Accountant; corporate executive

Sampageeta Tucker (born May 2, 1971), commonly known as Geeta Tucker, is a Canadian accountant and corporate executive who has served as a Canadian senator for Manitoba since 2026. She sits as a non-affiliated senator.

Before her appointment to the Senate, Tucker was president and chief executive officer of CPA Manitoba from 2019 to 2026. She previously held senior positions with Nortel Networks, Shaw Communications and Agriteam Canada Consulting.

Tucker moved with her family to Montreal, Quebec, when she was six years old. She is fluent in French, having completed high school and CEGEP in Quebec before attending the University of Waterloo in Ontario.

She earned a co-operative Bachelor of Mathematics and Chartered Accountancy degree with honours from Waterloo. She obtained her Certified Management Accountant designation in 1997 and was named a Fellow of the Society of Management Accountants of Canada in 2008. She later received the ICD.D designation from the Institute of Corporate Directors.

Tucker's maiden name was Sampageeta Ekbote. She has said that early in her career her résumé was passed over because of her unusual name, but when she changed the heading to "G. Tucker" she began receiving job opportunities.
