= John M. McNair =

Canadian politician

The Honourable John M. McNair
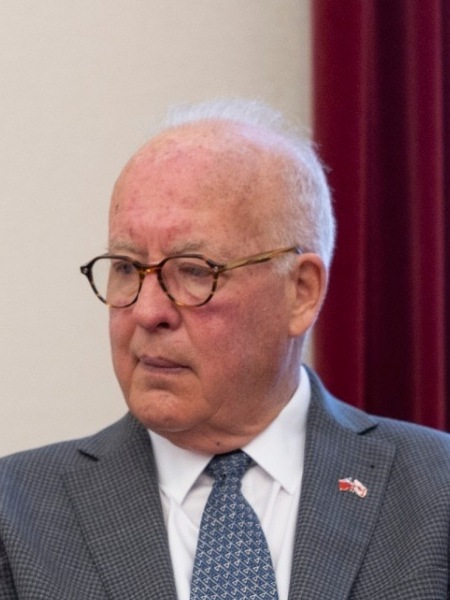

Canadian Senator from New Brunswick
- Incumbent
- Assumed office October 31, 2023
- Nominated by: Justin Trudeau
- Appointed by: Mary Simon

Personal details
- Born: June 3, 1957 (age 68)
- Party: Independent Senators Group

John M. McNair (born June 3, 1957) is a Canadian politician who has served as a senator from New Brunswick since October 2023.
