= Mohammad Al Zaibak =

Canadian politician

The Honourable Mohammad Al Zaibak

Canadian Senator from Ontario
- In office January 28, 2024 – August 9, 2026
- Nominated by: Justin Trudeau
- Appointed by: Mary Simon
- Preceded by: Ian Shugart

Personal details
- Born: August 9, 1951 (age 75) Damascus, Syria
- Party: Canadian Senators Group
- Education: Alexandria University, Harvard Business School

Mohammad Khair Al Zaibak (born August 9, 1951) is a Syrian-born Canadian entrepreneur, engineer, and politician who has served as a senator for Ontario from January 2024 until August 2026. Al Zaibak is based in Toronto.

== Background ==
Originally from Syria, Al Zaibak is president and chief executive officer of Canadian Development and Marketing Corporation, a holding company with interests in the information technology industry.

He was the co-founder and director of Teranet, a private company contracted by the government of Ontario to develop and manage the province's electronic land registration system. He is also a co-founder of Lifeline Syria, which helps refugees from that country come to Canada.

He has been on the board of governors of what is now Toronto Metropolitan University and on the board of trustees of the Royal Ontario Museum and the board of directors of Waterfront Toronto Corporation.

Al Zaibak has a degree in telecommunications and electro-physics engineering from Alexandria University and is also a graduate of the Harvard School of Business Administration.
