= Katherine Hay =

Canadian senator

The Honourable Katherine Hay

Canadian Senator from Ontario
- Incumbent
- Assumed office 7 March 2025
- Nominated by: Justin Trudeau
- Appointed by: Mary Simon

Personal details
- Born: 16 January 1961 (age 65)
- Party: Progressive Senate Group
- Education: University of Waterloo (BA)

Katherine Hay (born 16 January 1961) is a Canadian senator and nonprofit executive.

On 7 March 2025, she was appointed to the Senate of Canada as a representative for Ontario on the advice of Prime Minister Justin Trudeau.

At the time of her appointment, she had been president and chief executive officer of Kids Help Phone since 2017. Previously, she had been president and CEO of the Women's College Hospital Foundation.

She sits in the Senate as a member of the Progressive Senate Group.
