= Manuelle Oudar =

Canadian senator and civil servant

The Honourable Manuelle Oudar

Senator for Quebec
- Incumbent
- Assumed office 13 February 2024
- Nominated by: Justin Trudeau
- Appointed by: Mary Simon
- Preceded by: Pierre-Hugues Boisvenu

Personal details
- Born: July 5, 1963 (age 63)
- Party: Independent Senators Group
- Education: Université Laval (LL.B., LL.M.)
- Profession: Lawyer, civil servant

Manuelle Oudar is a Canadian senator who was appointed to the Senate of Canada as a senator from Quebec in 2024. On 13 February 2024, Prime Minister Justin Trudeau announced Oudar’s appointment to fill a vacancy in the Senate, and she formally joined the upper house later that month after being sworn in by Governor General Mary Simon.

== Early life ==
Oudar earned a Bachelor of Laws in 1984 and a Master of Laws in 1989 from Université Laval in Quebec City. She was called to the Quebec Bar and began her career in the Quebec public service in 1988.

== Career ==
Over more than three decades in the Quebec public service, Oudar held a number of legal and senior management roles. She first worked at the Ministries of Justice and Environment, then joined the legal affairs branch of the Ministries of Labour, Employment and Social Solidarity in 1992. She became the director of litigation in that department in 1997, coordinating legislative reforms in areas such as labour standards, pay equity, employment insurance, and parental insurance. In 2007, Oudar was appointed director of legal affairs for the Ministry of Education, Recreation and Sport, as well as for the Ministry of Culture, Communications and the Status of Women. She subsequently served as an assistant deputy minister for networks at the education ministry (Ministère de l’Éducation, du Loisir et du Sport) in 2010, and was promoted to Deputy Minister of Labour in 2012.

In September 2016, Oudar became the first female president and CEO of the newly formed CNESST, Quebec’s unified agency for labour standards, pay equity, and workplace health and safety. She led the organisation for eight years until the end of 2023. In August 2024, she was appointed to the Board of Governors at Polytechnique Montréal, contributing to the governance of one of Quebec’s leading engineering institutions., overseeing initiatives such as the creation of a single-entry service portal and the implementation of workplace reforms. During her tenure, the CNESST was awarded the United Nations Public Service Award in 2022 for its efforts in advancing gender equality and pay equity. Oudar stepped down from the CNESST upon her appointment to the Senate in early 2024.

== Senate of Canada ==
Following an open application process, an independent advisory board recommended Oudar for appointment to the Senate in late 2023. On 13 February 2024, Prime Minister Trudeau announced that Oudar would be appointed to the Senate to represent Quebec. She officially took her seat as an independent senator on 27 February 2024, after a swearing-in ceremony at the Senate chamber. Oudar initially sat as a non-affiliated senator upon her appointment in February 2024 but joined the Independent Senators Group on 1 May 2024. In 2024, she was named to the Senate Standing Committee on Agriculture and Forestry, as well as the Standing Committee on Energy, the Environment and Natural Resources.

== Political views ==
Throughout her career, Oudar has often been involved in initiatives related to social and workplace issues. She has been an invited speaker on topics including gender equality, pay equity, reducing social inequalities, and combating violence against women. In her role at the CNESST, she also promoted occupational health and safety and the inclusion of young workers in safe work environments.

== Honours and recognition ==
Oudar has received numerous awards and honours in recognition of her leadership. In 2017 she received the Leadership Award from the Association des femmes en finances du Québec (Women in Finance Association of Quebec). She was also named one of Canada’s 100 most influential women by the Women’s Executive Network (WXN). That same year, she was named one of Canada’s 100 most influential women by the Women’s Executive Network (WXN). In 2023, Oudar was honoured with the “Femmes de mérite” award from the Women’s Y Foundation of Montreal. She also received the 2023 Dirigeant de l’année (Leader of the Year) award from the Ordre des conseillers en ressources humaines agréés (Quebec HR Professionals Order) for her exemplary public service as head of the CNESST. Additionally, the Institut d’administration publique de Québec presented her with an Award of Excellence for public administration for the successful creation of the CNESST.
