= Jane MacAdam =

Canadian politician (born 1957)

The Honourable Jane MacAdam

Canadian Senator from Prince Edward Island
- Incumbent
- Assumed office May 3, 2023
- Nominated by: Justin Trudeau
- Appointed by: Mary Simon
- Preceded by: Mike Duffy

Personal details
- Born: March 1, 1957 (age 69)
- Party: Independent Senators Group

Beverly Jane MacAdam (born March 1, 1957) is a Canadian politician who has served as a senator from Prince Edward Island since May 2023.

== Career ==
MacAdam is a chartered professional accountant with over 40 years of experience in legislative auditing. She previously served as the Auditor General of Prince Edward Island between 2013 and 2020.

On May 3, 2023, she was summoned to the Senate of Canada by Governor General Mary Simon, on the advice of Prime Minister Justin Trudeau.
