= Joan Kingston =

Canadian politician (born 1955)

The Honourable Joan Kingston

Deputy Facilitator of the Independent Senators Group
- Incumbent
- Assumed office January 1, 2026
- Leader: Lucie Moncion
- Preceded by: Bernadette Clement

Canadian Senator from New Brunswick
- Incumbent
- Assumed office October 31, 2023
- Nominated by: Justin Trudeau
- Appointed by: Mary Simon

Member of the New Brunswick Legislative Assembly for New Maryland
- In office September 11, 1995 – June 7, 1999
- Preceded by: Riding established
- Succeeded by: Keith Ashfield

Personal details
- Born: January 8, 1955 (age 71) Sussex, New Brunswick
- Party: Independent Senators Group
- Other political affiliations: Liberal (until 2023)
- Occupation: Nurse/Professor

Joan Margaret Kingston (born January 8, 1955) is a Canadian nurse, former New Brunswick politician and senator. She was appointed to the Senate of Canada in November 2023 to represent New Brunswick and is a member of the Independent Senators Group. She has served as chair of the Standing Senate Committee on Energy, the Environment and Natural Resources and is currently Deputy Facilitator of the Independent Senators Group and Deputy Chair of the AOVS Standing Senate Committee on Audit and Oversight. Kingston is also a committee member of the Standing Senate Committee on National Finance. In February 2026 Joan Kingston became the sponsor of S-5 (45th Parliament, 1st Session) officially known as the Connected Care for Canadians Act. The act aimed to promote the interoperability of health information technology and to prohibit data blocking by health information technology vendors.

Kingston is a registered nurse and holds a Bachelor of Nursing from the University of New Brunswick. Immediately prior to her appointment to the Senate, she worked in nursing, community health, and nursing education, including a decade at the University of New Brunswick's Faculty of Nursing. Her roles at the university included nurse manager and co-manager of the Fredericton Downtown Community Health Centre, as well as lecturer and clinical instructor. She later continued to work with the Faculty of Nursing as a consultant.

Kingston was elected to the Legislative Assembly of New Brunswick for the electoral district of New Maryland in 1995 and served until 1999. During her time in the legislature, she held ministerial responsibilities including Labour, Environment and Human Rights. She also chaired the Minister's Advisory Committee on Multiculturalism and the New Brunswick Advisory Council on the Status of Women.

Kingston worked in New Brunswick government and public policy. From 2002 to 2006, she was a senior policy adviser in the Office of the Official Opposition. From 2006 to 2010, she served as a senior adviser to the Policy and Priorities Committee of the New Brunswick Cabinet and as Principal Secretary for government affairs in the Office of the Premier.

Her political and professional work includes health policy, community health, women's health, and social policy, focusing on the social deterrents of health. She has served with organizations including the United Way of Central New Brunswick, the Fredericton Non-Profit Housing Corporation, and the Community Action Group on Homelessness. She was also involved with research in primary and integrated health care innovations and served as clinical lead in the NB SPOR (Strategy for Patient-Oriented Research) Network. She served as co-chair of the Atlantic Centre of Excellence for Women's Health Steering Committee. She was a founding member of an organization that preceded the Canadian Association of Perinatal and Women's Health Nurses.

Kingston was president of the Nurses Association of New Brunswick and was awarded a life membership in the association in 2021. In the same year, she was inducted as a Fellow of the Canadian Academy of Nursing.

New Brunswick provincial government of Camille Thériault
Cabinet post (1)
Predecessor	Office	Successor
Roly MacIntyre	Minister of Labour; 1998–1999	Norm McFarlane
New Brunswick provincial government of Ray Frenette
Cabinet post (1)
Predecessor	Office	Successor
herself in McKenna government	Minister of the Environment; 1997–1998	Gene Devereux
New Brunswick provincial government of Frank McKenna
Special Cabinet Responsibilities
Predecessor	Title	Successor
Vaughn Blaney	Minister of the Environment; 1997	herself in Frenette government
