= Sharon Burey =

Canadian senator

The Honourable Sharon Burey

Canadian Senator from Ontario
- Incumbent
- Assumed office November 21, 2022
- Nominated by: Justin Trudeau
- Appointed by: Mary Simon

Personal details
- Born: December 4, 1957 (age 68) Jamaica

Sharon Burey (born December 4, 1957) is a Canadian senator and pediatrician from Ontario. She was appointed to the Senate of Canada on November 21, 2022, on the advice of Prime Minister Justin Trudeau.

== Background ==
Burey was born in Jamaica and moved to Canada in 1976. In addition to her work as a pediatrician, Burey is a health policy advocate, having served on the executive council of the Pediatricians Alliance of Ontario and the health policy committee of the Ontario Medical Association. She was the first woman of colour to become president of the Pediatricians Alliance of Ontario.
