= Bernadette Clement =

Canadian politician

The Honourable Bernadette Clement

Deputy Facilitator of the Independent Senators Group
- In office June 24, 2023 – January 1, 2026
- Leader: Raymonde Saint-Germain
- Preceded by: Tony Dean
- Succeeded by: Joan Kingston

Canadian Senator from Ontario
- Incumbent
- Assumed office June 22, 2021
- Nominated by: Justin Trudeau
- Appointed by: Richard Wagner
- Preceded by: Nicole Eaton

Mayor of Cornwall
- In office December 1, 2018 – June 22, 2021
- Preceded by: Leslie O'Shaughnessy
- Succeeded by: Glen Grant

Personal details
- Born: May 17, 1965 (age 61) Montreal, Quebec, Canada
- Party: Independent (since 2018)
- Other political affiliations: Liberal (until 2018)
- Profession: Lawyer; administrator

Bernadette Clement (born May 17, 1965) is a Canadian politician, who was appointed to the Canadian Senate by Liberal prime minister Justin Trudeau on June 22, 2021. She was previously mayor of Cornwall, Ontario, having been elected in the 2018 Ontario municipal elections, after serving three terms as a municipal councillor. A Black Canadian, she is the first woman and first person of colour to serve as mayor of the city, and the first Black Canadian woman to serve as a mayor in Ontario.

Senator Clement joined the Independent Senators Group's Facilitation Team as Chamber Coordinator in December 2022. She was elected as Deputy Facilitator six months later.

== Background ==
Born and raised in Montreal, Quebec, as the daughter of a Trinidadian father and a Franco-Manitoban mother, Clement attended the University of Ottawa, earning degrees in both civil law and common law and was called to the Ontario bar in 1991. She moved to Cornwall to begin working at what is now the Roy McMurtry Legal Clinic, ultimately becoming its executive director, and continued to work there up to the time of her appointment to the Senate. She was first elected to Cornwall City Council in 2006 as a city councillor.

She conducted her mayoral campaign on the themes of developing a more collaborative team-oriented approach to managing the city, as well as seeking a way to advance the city's proposed but long-delayed waterfront redevelopment project.

Clement also ran as a Liberal Party of Canada candidate for the electoral district of Stormont—Dundas—South Glengarry in the 2011 Canadian federal election and the 2015 Canadian federal election.
