= Pierre Dalphond =

Canadian senator from Quebec

The Honourable Pierre Dalphond

Legislative Liaison of the Independent Senators Group
- Incumbent
- Assumed office January 1, 2026
- Preceded by: David Arnot (Canadian politician)

Leader of the Progressive Senate Group
- In office February 27, 2024 – May 14, 2025
- Preceded by: Jane Cordy

Canadian Senator from Quebec (De Lorimier)
- Incumbent
- Assumed office June 6, 2018
- Nominated by: Justin Trudeau
- Appointed by: Julie Payette

Personal details
- Born: May 1, 1954 (age 71) Joliette, Quebec, Canada
- Party: Independent Senators Group
- Other political affiliations: Progressive Senate Group (2020-2025)

Pierre Dalphond (born May 1, 1954) is a Canadian lawyer and jurist who currently serves as a Canadian senator from Quebec (De Lorimier). He was appointed to the Senate on June 6, 2018. From February 2024 until May 2025, he had been leader of the Progressive Senate Group. On September 5, 2025 he rejoined the Independent Senators Group, and since January 2026 he has served on its leadership team as legislative liaison.

== Early life and career ==
Born in Joliette, Quebec, Dalphond was educated at the University of Montreal, Dalhousie University and the University of Oxford. He served as a law clerk at the Supreme Court of Canada and worked in the Privy Council Office. He is a lawyer and mediator by training, currently working at Stikeman Elliott. He was appointed to the Superior Court of Quebec in 1995 and to the Quebec Court of Appeal in 2002. He retired from the Court of Appeal in 2014.

== Senate ==
From his appointment, Dalphond sat as a member of the Independent Senators Group. On May 21, 2020, Dalphond joined the Progressive Senate Group. His addition to the caucus brought the PSG's caucus to nine, and restored its official status.

Dalphond announced his intention to oppose use of the Emergencies Act during the "Freedom Convoy" protests, suggesting that it was a violation of section 8 of the Canadian Charter of Rights and Freedoms, which relates to "unreasonable search and seizure." On January 16, 2026, the Federal Court of Appeal ruled that the federal government's decision to invoke the Emergencies Act was unreasonable and ultra vires, and that related regulations and an economic order infringed paragraph 2(b) and section 8 of the Canadian Charter of Rights and Freedoms.
