= Independent Senators Group =

Parliamentary group in the Senate of Canada

Independent Senators Group Groupe des sénateurs indépendants
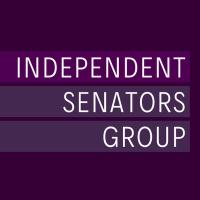
- Facilitator: Lucie Moncion
- Deputy facilitator: Joan Kingston
- Founded: March 10, 2016
- Ideology: Non-partisan, Technical group
- Senate: 40 / 105

Website
- www.isgsenate.ca

The Independent Senators Group (ISG; French: Groupe des sénateurs indépendants) is a parliamentary group in the Senate of Canada. Established on March 10, 2016, the Independent Senators Group is committed to a non-partisan Senate and the modernization of the Upper House of Canada's Parliament. The Independent Senators Group is the largest parliamentary group in the Senate. Composed of independents not affiliated with any political caucus, members of the group work cooperatively, but act independently.

The majority of Independent Senators Group members have been Canadians who have applied directly to the Senate through the Independent Advisory Board for Senate Appointments. The Advisory Board, when convened by the Prime Minister, reviews applications in provinces and territories where there are planned or current vacancies. Organizations and individuals are also encouraged to nominate high-quality individuals whom they consider to be potential candidates for appointment to the Senate and whom they feel meet the assessment criteria. Individuals who are nominated for a Senate appointment are still required to submit an online application.

== History ==
In January 2014, Liberal Leader Justin Trudeau proposed the Senate should be made non-partisan, to better serve Canadians. He suggested an "open, transparent, non-partisan process" that would see all senators named to the Red Chamber sit as Independents.

The Trudeau government began appointing independent senators, which in theory would make the Senate a non-partisan body. The growing number of these appointments created a challenge within the upper house as it had always been organized along partisan lines and there were no mechanisms in place to deal with a large number of independent senators, in terms of funding or appointments to committees, whereas the Conservative and Senate Liberal Caucuses were funded and guaranteed appointments.

=== As working group (2016–17) ===
On March 10, 2016, six non-affiliated senators, former Independent Progressive Conservative Senator Elaine McCoy, former Conservative caucus members Jacques Demers, John D. Wallace, Michel Rivard and Diane Bellemare and former Liberal Pierrette Ringuette formed an independent, non-partisan working group that would "ensure the rights of equality" for all senators, "regardless of their political or non-political affiliation" while working to restore "public confidence" in the upper house "as a necessary and vital institution".

In order to press for the recognition of the equal rights and obligations of non-affiliated senators and facilitate their activities, the group, which had grown to fifteen senators adopted the name "Independent Senators Group". On September 27, 2016 the members of the ISG elected McCoy to act as the group's facilitator until the end of the parliamentary term in June 2017. Unlike the two partisan caucuses, the ISG announced it would not have parliamentary whips and that its members would not vote together except on issues such as changes to Senate rules and logistics that would accommodate the existence and rights of independent senators.

The Senate formally recognized the ISG on December 2, 2016, passing a motion to fund the Independent Senators Group for the next two fiscal years. It was also agreed to make appointments of non-affiliated senators to committees proportionate to their numbers. However, the ISG's assigned budget of C$722,000 for 2017–2018 was less than the C$1 million allotted to each of the partisan caucuses.

Beginning in January 2017, the official Senate website distinguished affiliations between members of the Independent Senators Group and other non-affiliated senators by listing ISG members as "Non-affiliated (ISG)". Several non-affiliated senators, including Speaker of the Senate of Canada George Furey and former Representative of the Government in the Senate Peter Harder (along with two senators who share responsibilities with them) remain entirely non-affiliated and are not members of the ISG.

=== As parliamentary group (2017–present) ===
On May 17, 2017, senators voted to remove the requirement that a caucus must be formed by senators who are members of a political party, making the ISG equal under the rules of the senate with the two partisan caucuses. Following that change, McCoy stated that the ISG's influence in Senate standing committees will be increased to ensure its representation is proportional to the other caucuses.

A formal secret ballot election was announced in June 2017 to replace facilitator Elaine McCoy. At the close of nominations on September 22, 2017, Yuen Pau Woo was the only candidate for facilitator with Raymonde Saint-Germain the only candidate for Deputy Facilitator. Larry Campbell had intended to run but decided to recuse himself. Woo and Saint-Germain were acclaimed on September 25, 2017. In October 2017, the ISG replaced its previous informal approach to membership with a requirement that all new applicants for membership in the caucus be approved by at least 60 percent of current ISG members.

On October 30, 2017, the ISG became the largest caucus in the Senate. Following an agreement between the three Senate caucuses, a November 2, 2017 motion reallocating committee positions saw the ISG allotted both committee chair and committee member positions proportional to the size of their membership.

On November 4, 2019, eight senators from the ISG joined with two Conservative senators and one non-affiliated senator to form a new non-partisan parliamentary group known as the Canadian Senators Group. Speaking with CTV News' Don Martin, CSG interim leader Scott Tannas cited the concern that the ISG— then numbering 58 members— had become too large, and that a "wider range of views and approaches" was needed. Included among those decamping to the CSG was former facilitator Elaine McCoy.

On November 14, 2019, the government's legislative deputy representative Diane Bellemare left her position and joined the ISG. On January 24, 2020, Senator Marc Gold left the Independent Senators Group, including his position as Caucus Liaison, to sit as a non-affiliated senator following his agreeing to become the new Representative of the Government in the Senate.

After the establishment of the Progressive Senate Group in late 2019, several ISG members left to join that caucus throughout 2020 and 2021: Patricia Bovey, Marty Klyne, Brian Francis and Margaret Dawn Anderson.

On February 1, 2021, former senator Murray Sinclair was announced as the group's first Indigenous Advisor.

On November 29, 2021, the ISG announced that Saint-Germain was elected by acclamation to be the next caucus facilitator. Tony Dean was announced as the new deputy facilitator. Under the ISG's charter, a facilitator can serve for a maximum of two two-year terms, meaning that incumbent facilitator Woo was term-limited. Woo congratulated Saint-Germain and pledged his full support. Saint-Germain and Dean's roles formally began on January 1, 2022.

In June 2023, Bernadette Clement was elected as the new deputy facilitator, replacing Tony Dean.

== Membership ==
Name	Province (Division)
Dawn Arnold	New Brunswick
David Arnot	Saskatchewan
Peter Boehm	Ontario
Victor Boudreau	New Brunswick
Yvonne Boyer	Ontario
Bev Busson	British Columbia
Bernadette Clement	Ontario
René Cormier	New Brunswick
Mary Coyle	Nova Scotia
Pierre Dalphond	Quebec (De Lorimier)
Donna Dasko	Ontario
Marty Deacon	Ontario
Tony Dean	Ontario
Baltej Singh Dhillon	British Columbia
Éric Forest	Quebec (Gulf)
Rosa Galvez	Quebec (Bedford)
Margo Greenwood	British Columbia
Martine Hébert	Quebec (Victoria)
Nancy Karetak-Lindell	Nunavut
Joan Kingston	New Brunswick
Stan Kutcher	Nova Scotia
Tony Loffreda	Quebec (Shawinegan)
Jane MacAdam	Prince Edward Island
Marnie McBean	Ontario
John M. McNair	New Brunswick
Farah Mohamed	Ontario
Lucie Moncion	Ontario
Rosemary Moodie	Ontario
Manuelle Oudar	Quebec (La Salle)
Kim Pate	Ontario
Chantal Petitclerc	Quebec (Grandville)
Mohamed-Iqbal Ravalia	Newfoundland and Labrador
Pierrette Ringuette	New Brunswick
Raymonde Saint-Germain	Quebec (De la Vallière)
Paulette Senior	Ontario
Paula Simons	Alberta
Allister Surette	Nova Scotia
Toni Varone	Ontario
Yuen Pau Woo	British Columbia
Suze Youance	Quebec (Lauzon)
Hassan Yussuff	Ontario

== Leadership ==
Facilitators

- Elaine McCoy (September 27, 2016 – September 25, 2017)
- Yuen Pau Woo (September 25, 2017 – December 31, 2021)
- Raymonde Saint-Germain (January 1, 2022 – January 1, 2026)
- Lucie Moncion (January 1, 2026 – present)

Deputy Facilitator

- Raymonde Saint-Germain (September 25, 2017 - December 31, 2021)
- Tony Dean (January 1, 2022 – June 24, 2023)
- Bernadette Clement (June 24, 2023 – present)
- Joan Kingston (January 1, 2026 – present)

Others

- Pierre Dalphond – Legislative Liaison (January 1, 2026 – present)
- Chantal Petitclerc - Chair of Group Deliberations (January 1, 2022 – present)

== Question of independence ==
A 2017 CBC News study found that independent senators appointed by Justin Trudeau voted with the government 94.5 percent of the time.

The Globe and Mail reported in May 2019 that Trudeau used Liberalist, a Liberal Party donor database and organizing guide, in order to vet prospective Senate appointees.

== See also ==
- Canadian Senators Group
- Progressive Senate Group
- Senate Liberal Caucus
