= Marty Deacon =

Canadian politician

The Honourable Marty Deacon

Canadian Senator from Ontario
- Incumbent
- Assumed office February 15, 2018
- Nominated by: Justin Trudeau
- Appointed by: Julie Payette

Personal details
- Born: April 23, 1958 (age 68) Oakville, Ontario, Canada
- Party: Independent Senators Group
- Profession: teacher

Martha Deacon (born April 23, 1958) was named to the Senate of Canada, representing the province of Ontario, by Prime Minister Justin Trudeau on February 15, 2018. Prior to her appointment she was an educator and had had a long history of involvement with amateur sport. She served as Canada’s chef de mission for the 2010 Commonwealth Games in India, and is also a director of the Canadian Olympic Committee and Commonwealth Games Canada. She is a recipient of the International Olympic Committee's Education and Youth Award and has also been inducted into the Cambridge, Ontario Sports Hall of Fame.

Deacon has been a school teacher and had other positions with the school board in the Regional Municipality of Waterloo.

In 2018, she served as the chair of the local organizing committee (LOC) for the 2018 BWF World Junior Championships held in Markham, Ontario.

== Education ==
She received a Bachelor of Physical and Health Ed., at McMaster University, then completed her Master of Arts, at McMaster University. She completed her Bachelor of Education, The University of Western Ontario.
