= Jim Quinn (New Brunswick politician) =

Canadian politician (born 1957)

The Honourable Jim Quinn

Canadian Senator from New Brunswick
- Incumbent
- Assumed office June 22, 2021
- Nominated by: Justin Trudeau
- Appointed by: Richard Wagner
- Preceded by: Joseph A. Day

Personal details
- Born: James Quinn; January 25, 1957 (age 69) Saint John, New Brunswick, Canada
- Party: Conservative
- Other political affiliations: Canadian Senators Group (2021–2026)
- Profession: Senator

James Quinn (born January 25, 1957) is a Canadian Senator from New Brunswick. He was appointed to the Senate of Canada on June 22, 2021, by Chief Justice Richard Wagner in his capacity as the Administrator of the Government of Canada on the advice of prime minister Justin Trudeau.

Quinn is a graduate of Dalhousie University (BSc) and holds the professional designation of Certified Management Accountant (CMA) – Certified Public Accountant (CPA). He was previously the president and CEO of Saint John Port Authority and brought over 30 years of experience in the marine and public sectors to Port Saint John, where he began his career on Coast Guard (CG) ships and oil tanker ships, in 1973. In 1981, he rejoined the CG and in 1982, he moved to the CG headquarters in Ottawa, where he was promoted to leadership positions including Regional Director of the Central and Arctic Region and Director General, Marine Programs.

After 23 years with the Coast Guard, Quinn joined the Privy Council Office’s Machinery of Government Secretariat and Social Development Policy Secretariat as a senior advisor. In 2002, he joined Indian and Northern Affairs Canada as Director General of Lands and was promoted through several leadership positions culminating in the Chief Financial Officer/Assistant Deputy Minister role. Quinn also held the position of Chief Financial Officer at the Canadian International Development Agency before leaving government to work at Port Saint John.

He also serves as Honorary Lieutenant Colonel for the 3rd Field Artillery Regiment (The Loyal Company), 5th division army.

On July 8, 2026, Quinn joined the Conservative Party of Canada Senate caucus.
