= Krista Ann Ross =

Canadian politician (born 1967)

The Honourable Krista Ann Ross

Canadian Senator from New Brunswick
- Incumbent
- Assumed office October 31, 2023
- Nominated by: Justin Trudeau
- Appointed by: Mary Simon

Personal details
- Born: September 30, 1967 (age 59) Fredericton, New Brunswick
- Party: Canadian Senators Group
- Education: New Brunswick Community College

Krista Ann Ross (born September 30, 1967) is a Canadian politician who has served as a senator from New Brunswick since October 2023.

Ms. Ross is a business and community leader who worked with the Fredericton Chamber of Commerce for 20 years (from 1989 to 1997 and from 2011 to 2023). During her time with the organization, Ms. Ross served for 12 years as Chief Executive Officer and for eight years as general manager. In these roles, she was a leading voice supporting Fredericton and New Brunswick’s development as a place of opportunity for individuals, businesses and community organizations.

In addition to her work with the Chamber of Commerce, Ms. Ross was also a private business owner and entrepreneur for many years.

Ms. Ross recently served as a commissioner with the Electoral Boundaries and Representation Commission for New Brunswick. She also serves on the board of the Fredericton Community Foundation, the University of New Brunswick Business Faculty Advisory Board, and the Ignite Fredericton Seed Board. She is an active supporter of immigration, and she provides mentorship and support to newcomers in Canada.

Ms. Ross has been celebrated for her community involvement and business leadership. She was recently named to the Chamber of Commerce Executives of Canada’s Council of Excellence, twice named Chamber Executive of the Year in Canada, and named a Top 50 CEO for Atlantic Canada. She is also a recipient of the Advocacy in Action Silver Award from the Canadian Chamber of Commerce. In 2022, she was recognized by the New Brunswick Community College as an Alumna of Distinction; she also received the Queen Elizabeth II Platinum Jubilee Medal.

She holds a business diploma from the New Brunswick Community College.

== Personal life ==
Ms. Ross and her daughter, Rachel, reside in Fredericton.
