= Martine Hébert =

Canadian Senator representing QC

The Honourable Martine Hébert

Canadian Senator from Quebec
- Incumbent
- Assumed office February 27, 2025
- Nominated by: Justin Trudeau
- Appointed by: Mary Simon

Personal details
- Born: October 7, 1965 (age 61)
- Party: Independent Senators Group
- Profession: Economist, former diplomat

Martine Hébert is an economist, former diplomat, media economic analyst, communicator and Canadian politician from Quebec.

Since February 2025, she has been a Senator, representing the Victoria Division of Quebec in the Senate of Canada.

== Biography ==
Born on 7 October 1965, Martine Hébert obtained a bachelor's degree in 1988 and a master's degree in 1990 in economics from the Université de Montréal. She continued part-time her education in Legal Science at the Université du Québec à Montréal. In 2010, she was named an honorary graduate by the Université de Montréal, in recognition of her contribution and the excellence of her career.

She served as Quebec's Delegate in Chicago from 2019 to 2021 and as Quebec's Delegate General in New York from 2021 to 2024.

Prior to her appointment to the Senate, she was a media commentator and vice-president of economic and U.S. affairs at TACT, a public relations and communications agency.

On 7 February 2025, she was appointed Senator for Quebec by the Governor General of Canada, Mary Simon, on the advice of Prime Minister Justin Trudeau. In April, she joined the Independent Senate Group.
