= Raymonde Saint-Germain =

Canadian politician

The Honourable Raymonde Saint-Germain

Facilitator of the Independent Senators Group
- In office January 1, 2022 – January 1, 2026
- Deputy: Bernadette Clement
- Preceded by: Yuen Pau Woo
- Succeeded by: Lucie Moncion

Deputy Facilitator of the Independent Senators Group
- In office September 25, 2017 – January 1, 2022
- Leader: Yuen Pau Woo
- Preceded by: Position created
- Succeeded by: Bernadette Clement

Senator for De la Vallière, Quebec
- In office November 25, 2016 – October 7, 2026
- Nominated by: Justin Trudeau
- Appointed by: David Johnston
- Preceded by: Pierre De Bané

Personal details
- Born: October 7, 1951 (age 75) Quebec City, Canada
- Party: Independent Senators Group
- Profession: Public servant

Raymonde Saint-Germain (born October 7, 1951) is a Canadian public servant and was an independent member of the Senate of Canada from 2016 until her retirement in 2026. At the time of her appointment, Saint Germain was the Quebec ombudsperson. She was nominated for appointment to the Senate on November 2, 2016, by Prime Minister Justin Trudeau. Saint-Germain assumed her office on November 25, 2016. From 2022 to 2026, Senator Saint-Germain served as Facilitator of the Independent Senators Group (ISG) in the Senate of Canada.

== Education ==
In 1973, she obtained a bachelor's degree in journalism and information from Laval University. She then continued her studies in 1983 at the National School of Public Administration (ENAP), in the Master's program in International Management. Saint-Germain also holds a Certificate for Ombudsman at the Osgoode Hall Law School of York University.

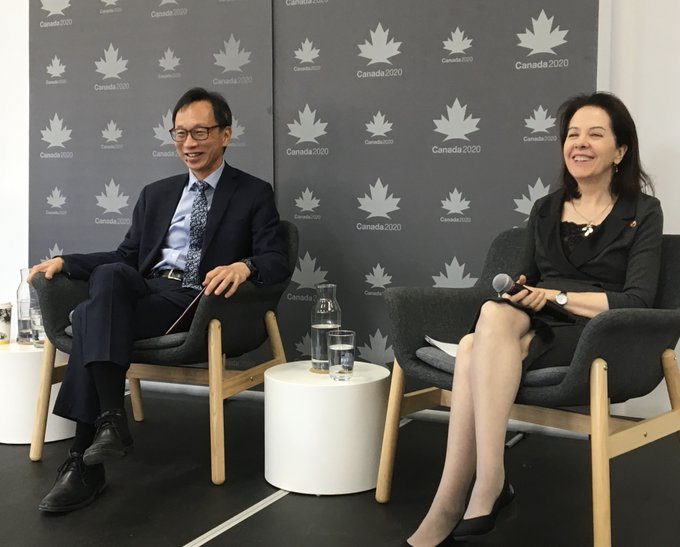
Senator Saint-Germain and Senator Woo at a panel on the future of the Senate

== Quebec Ombudsperson ==
From 2006 to 2016, Saint-Germain served as Québec Ombudsperson for two consecutive five-year terms. For each of her mandates, she was unanimously appointed by the members of the National Assembly of Quebec. Before her departure from this position, the National Assembly adopted a unanimous motion commending her exceptional contribution and excellence in fulfilling her mandates as Quebec Ombudsperson.

== Senate of Canada ==
Senator Saint-Germain is currently a member of Standing Senate Committee on Internal Economy, Budgets and Administration. She also chairs the Subcommittee on Human Resources.

Senator Saint-Germain has also served on the Standing Senate Committee on National Security and Defence, on the Standing Senate Committee on Transport and Communications as well as the Standing Senate Committee on Foreign Affairs and International Trade.

In 2018, Senator Saint-Germain sponsored, in the Senate, Bill C-47 An Act to amend the Export and Import Permits Act and the Criminal Code (amendments permitting the accession to the Arms Trade Treaty and other amendments). This bill, which sought Canada's accession to the Arms Trade Treaty (ATT), was introduced by Canadian Foreign Minister Chrystia Freeland in the wake of popular outrage over the sale of light armoured vehicles by General Dynamics to Saudi Arabia. The bill was passed on December 13, 2018.

As Chair of the Subcommittee on Human Resources, she tabled a report in February 2019 on the modernization of the Senate's anti-harassment policy.

=== Other activities ===
- President, Association of French-Speaking Ombudspersons and Mediators (2013-2015)
- Vice-president, Association of French-Speaking Ombudspersons and Mediators (2009-2013)
- Instructor, Osgoode Hall Law School, Professional Development Osgoode/FCO Essentials for Ombuds Certificate (2013-2017)
- Collaborator, chair in Research on Democracy and Parliamentary Institutions, Laval University (2010-2017)
- Vice-president, Community Foundation of Greater Québec (2009-2012)
- Member, board of directors, Community Foundation of Greater Québec Member, Audit Committee, Fundraising Committee-Community Foundation of Greater Québec (2007-2009)
- Co-president, Centraide Charity Campaign, Public and Parapublic Sectors of Québec (2002-2004)
- Member, board of directors, Raoul-Dandurand Chair in Strategic Studies and Diplomacy, University of Québec in Montréal (1997-2000)
- Member, board of directors, Wallonia-Brussels Youth Agency (1990-1993)
