= Toni Varone =

Canandian politician

Toni Varone is a business executive and Canadian Senator. He was appointed to the Senate on the advice of Justin Trudeau on December 20, 2023. He is president of Varone Group Inc., a family run group of companies involved in the hospitality, home building, development and property management sectors. He is the first Italian Canadian senator since Consiglio Di Nino retired in 2012.
