= Judith Seidman =

Canadian medical researcher and politician

The Honourable Judith Seidman

Canadian Senator from De la Durantaye, Quebec
- In office August 27, 2009 – September 1, 2025
- Nominated by: Stephen Harper
- Appointed by: Michaëlle Jean
- Preceded by: Lise Bacon
- Succeeded by: Tom Pitfield

Personal details
- Born: September 1, 1950 (age 76)
- Party: Conservative

Judith Seidman (born September 1, 1950) is a Canadian medical researcher and politician. She was named to the Senate of Canada as a Conservative on August 27, 2009. She served until her mandatory retirement in 2025, on her 75th birthday.

Seidman was the Quebec co-chair of Stephen Harper's 2004 leadership campaign.

She is an epidemiologist and social worker by profession as well as a researcher and adviser in the health and social services fields.

Seidman is Jewish.
