= Lucie Moncion =

Canadian banker (born 1958)

The Honourable Lucie Moncion

Facilitator of the Independent Senators Group
- Incumbent
- Assumed office January 1, 2026
- Deputy: Joan Kingston
- Preceded by: Raymonde Saint-Germain

Canadian Senator from Ontario
- Incumbent
- Assumed office November 10, 2016
- Nominated by: Justin Trudeau
- Appointed by: David Johnston

Personal details
- Born: October 25, 1958 (age 68)
- Party: Independent Senators Group

Lucie Moncion (born October 25, 1958) is a Canadian banker, who was appointed to the Senate of Canada on October 30, 2016. She sits in the Senate as an independent, representing the province of Ontario.

Prior to her appointment, Moncion was president and chief executive officer of the Alliance des caisses populaires de l’Ontario, a network of 12 caisses populaires serving Northern Ontario, and served on the boards of Nipissing University, Collège Boréal and Direction Ontario.

On December 10, 2025, Moncion was elected to a two-year term as facilitator of the Independent Senators Group. She assumed the role on January 1, 2026.
