= 43rd Canadian Parliament =

2019–2021 legislative term

- Minority parliament
- Dec. 5, 2019 – Aug. 15, 2021
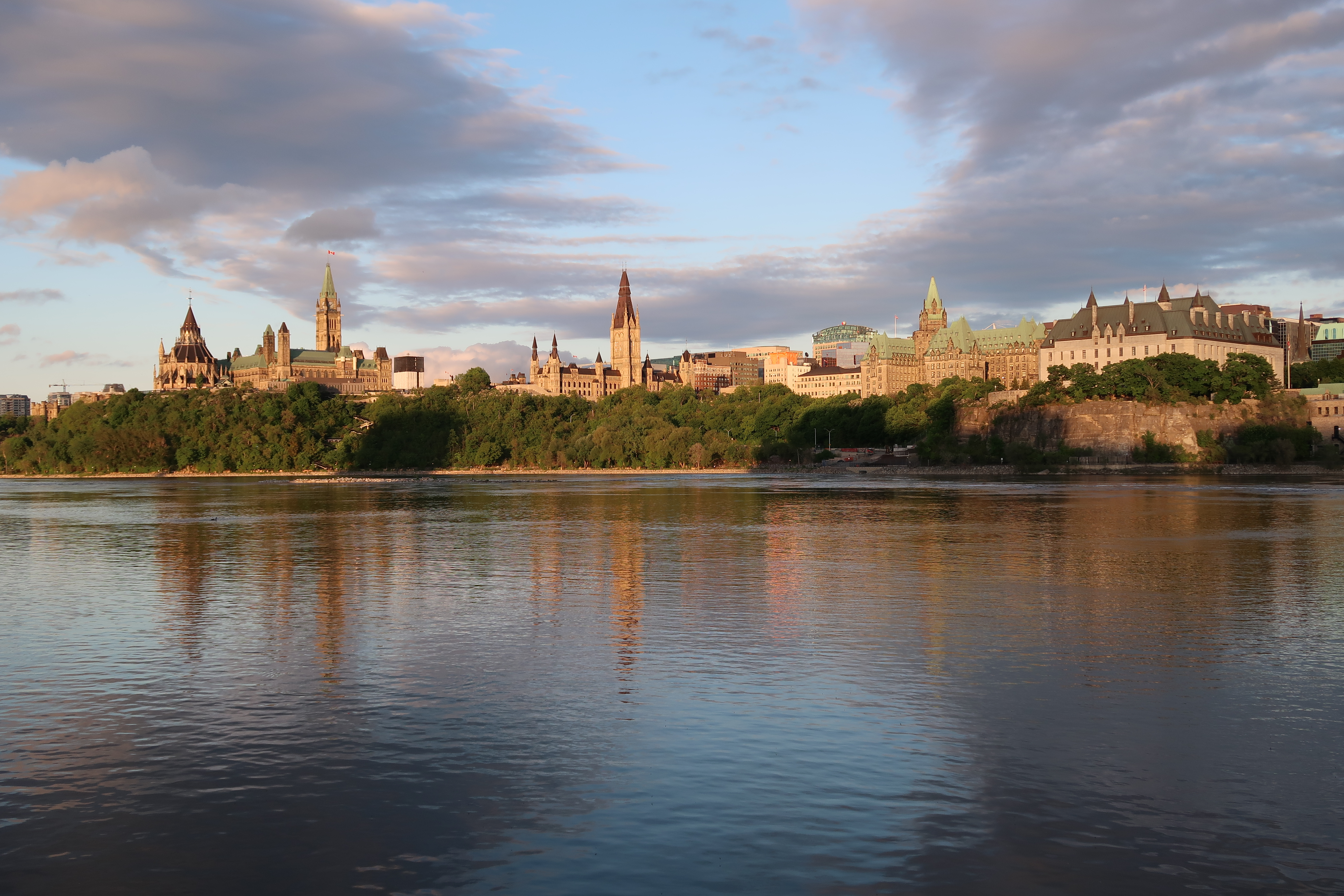
- Canadian Parliament (2020)

Parliament leaders
- Prime minister: Rt. Hon. Justin Trudeau; Nov. 4, 2015 – Mar. 14, 2025
- Cabinet: 29th Canadian Ministry
- Leader of the Opposition: Hon. Andrew Scheer; 27 May 2017 – 24 August 2020
- Hon. Erin O'Toole; 24 August 2020 – 15 August 2021

Party caucuses
- Government: Liberal Party
- Opposition: Conservative Party
- Recognized: Bloc Québécois
- New Democratic Party
- Independent Senators Group*
- Canadian Senators Group*
- Progressive Senate Group*
- Unrecognized: Green Party
- * Only in the Senate.

House of Commons
- Seating arrangements of the House of Commons
- Speaker of the Commons: Hon. Anthony Rota; 5 December 2019 – 27 September 2023
- Government House leader: Hon. Pablo Rodríguez; 20 November 2019 – 26 October 2021
- Opposition House leader: Hon. Candice Bergen; 15 September 2016 – 2 September 2020
- Gérard Deltell; 2 September 2020 – 7 February 2022
- Members: 338 MP seats List of members

Senate
- Seating arrangements of the Senate
- Speaker of the Senate: Hon. George Furey; 3 December 2015 – 12 May 2023
- Government Senate rep.: Hon. Marc Gold; 24 January 2020 – present
- Opposition Senate leader: Hon. Don Plett; 5 November 2019 – present
- Senators: 105 senator seats List of senators

Sovereign
- Monarch: Elizabeth II; 6 February 1952 – 8 September 2022
- Governor general: HE Rt. Hon. Julie Payette; 2 October 2017 – 23 January 2021
- HE Rt. Hon. Richard Wagner as Administrator of Canada; 23 January 2021 – 26 July 2021
- HE Rt. Hon. Mary Simon; 26 July 2021 – 8 June 2026

Sessions
- 1st session 5 December 2019 – 18 August 2020
- 2nd session 23 September 2020 – 15 August 2021
← 42nd	→ 44th

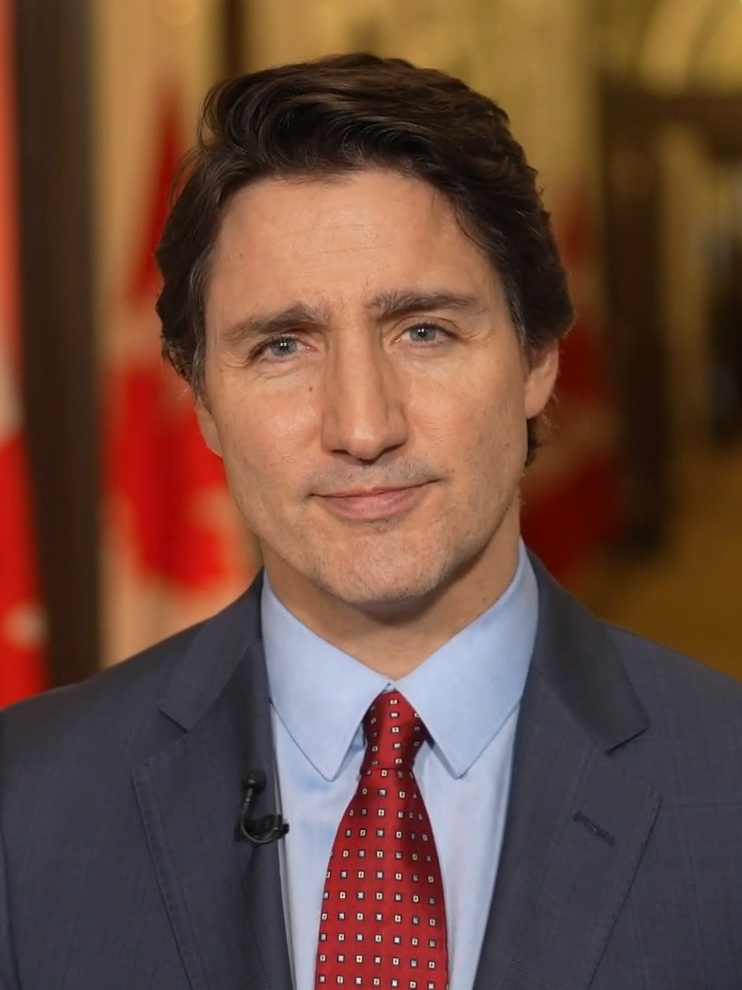
Justin Trudeau was Prime Minister during the 43rd Canadian Parliament.

The 43rd Canadian Parliament was in session from December 5, 2019, to August 15, 2021, with the membership of its Lower House, the House of Commons of Canada, having been determined by the results of the 2019 federal election held on October 21, 2019. It was dissolved prior to the 2021 Federal Election.

There were two sessions of the 43rd Parliament:

Session	Start	End
1st	December 5, 2019	August 18, 2020
2nd	September 23, 2020	August 15, 2021

== Overview ==
Parliament officially resumed on December 5, 2019, with the election of a new Speaker, Anthony Rota, followed by a speech from the throne the following day. On August 15, 2021, Prime Minister Justin Trudeau advised Governor General Mary Simon to dissolve Parliament and issue the writ of election, leading to a 5-week election campaign period for the 2021 federal election.

== Party standings ==
Standings in the 43rd Canadian Parliament
Affiliation	House members			Senate members		
Affiliation	2019 election results	At dissolution	+/-	On election day 2019	At dissolution	+/-
Liberal	157	155	▼2	–	–	Steady
Conservative	121	119	▼2	29	19	▼10
Bloc Québécois	32	32	Steady	–	–	Steady
New Democratic	24	24	Steady	–	–	Steady
Green	3	2	▼1	–	–	Steady
Independent	1	5	▲4	7	13	▲6
Indep. Senators	–	–	Steady	57	40	▼17
Senate Liberal Caucus	–	–	Steady	9	–	▼9
Canadian Senators Group	–	–	Steady	–	12	▲12
Progressive Senate Group	–	–	Steady	–	11	▲11
Total members	338	337		102	95	
Vacant	–	1	▲1	3	10	▲7
Total seats	338			105		

== Major events ==
=== 2019 ===
- October 21, 2019: In the 43rd Canadian federal election, the incumbent Liberal Party lost its majority but won the most seats in the House of Commons.
- October 23, 2019: The Liberals ruled out any "formal or informal" coalition government with any other party.
- October 29, 2019: Incumbent prime minister Justin Trudeau met with Governor General Julie Payette to officially confirm that he intended to form a government.
- October 30, 2019: Green Party leader Elizabeth May, MP for Saanich—Gulf Islands, announced her interest in running for Speaker of the House of Commons, a position that would necessitate stepping down from her position as party leader.
- November 3, 2019: The Liberals announced that Trudeau would meet with opposition leaders during the week of November 11 to see if any common ground existed.
- November 4, 2019: Elizabeth May resigned as leader of the Green Party effective immediately and ruled out a bid for Speaker. May announced that she will remain an MP and named deputy Green Party leader Jo-Ann Roberts as the party's interim leader until her successor is chosen.
- November 6, 2019: The Conservative caucus voted against using a section of federal law that would have given them the authority to remove Andrew Scheer as party leader.
- November 18, 2019: Maxime Bernier announced that he will stay on as leader of the People's Party and that he will run again in the 44th Canadian election, or before then, if there is a by-election.
- November 20, 2019: The new Cabinet was sworn in, the first overseen by Governor General Julie Payette.
- December 5, 2019: The 43rd Parliament was convened. Anthony Rota was elected as the new Speaker of the House and the Throne Speech was read.
- December 12, 2019: Andrew Scheer announces his intention to resign as leader of the Conservative Party of Canada but stay on as MP for Regina—Qu'Appelle.

=== 2020 ===
- March 13, 2020: Parliament sessions are suspended until April 20 amidst the COVID-19 pandemic.
- June 6, 2020: Kitchener South—Hespeler MP Marwan Tabbara resigned from the Liberal caucus after being charged with assault, break and enter and criminal harassment.
- August 17, 2020: Liberal Finance Minister Bill Morneau resigned from cabinet and as the MP for Toronto Centre, amid controversy relating to the WE scandal. He planned to bid for the Secretary-General of OECD.
- August 18, 2020: Prime Minister Trudeau prorogues Parliament until September 23.
- August 23–24, 2020: The Conservative Party held a leadership election to replace Andrew Scheer. The original date of June 27 had been postponed due to the coronavirus pandemic. Durham MP Erin O'Toole was elected as the new Conservative leader.
- September 1, 2020: Liberal Michael Levitt resigned as MP for York Centre to become the president and CEO of the Canadian Friends of Simon Wiesenthal Centre for Holocaust Studies, necessitating a by-election in the riding.
- September 23, 2020: Parliament came back into session. Speech from the Throne.
- October 3, 2020: Annamie Paul wins the 2020 Green Party leadership election to replace Elizabeth May.
- October 26, 2020: By-elections were held in the ridings of Toronto Centre and York Centre, electing Liberal candidates Marci Ien and Ya'ara Saks, respectively.
- November 9, 2020: Don Valley East MP Yasmin Ratansi resigned from the Liberal caucus after a CBC News investigation revealed she had violated parliamentary rules on Nepotism.

=== 2021 ===
- January 12, 2021: Mississauga—Malton MP Navdeep Bains, the Minister of Innovation, Science and Industry, resigned from the cabinet. A larger cabinet reshuffle took place.
- January 20, 2021: Hastings—Lennox and Addington MP Derek Sloan was expelled from the Conservative caucus after accepting donations from white supremacist Paul Fromm.
- January 21, 2021: Governor-General Julie Payette and her secretary Assunta Di Lorenzo resign after an investigation reveals they presided over a toxic workplace.
- January 25, 2021: Brampton Centre MP Ramesh Sangha was removed from the Liberal caucus because of his spreading claims against multiple other Liberal MPs that they were harbouring support for the Khalistan movement.
- May 11, 2021: Conservative Diane Finley, who represented Haldimand—Norfolk, resigned as an MP, leaving a vacancy. A by-election was pending.
- June 10, 2021: Green MP Jenica Atwin, representing Fredericton, crossed the floor to join the Liberals.
- June 21, 2021: The Trudeau government took House Speaker Anthony Rota to the Federal Court of Canada over his order that the Commons be provided documents concerning the dismissal by the PHAC of Xiangguo Qiu and her husband.
- August 15, 2021: Governor General Mary Simon (at the request of Prime Minister Trudeau) dissolves the 43rd Parliament & sets the election date for September 20, 2021.

== Legislation and motions ==
=== First session ===
The first session of the 43rd Parliament opened on December 5, 2019, with the speech from the throne delivered by Governor General Julie Payette. Although several bills were introduced, the agenda was overtaken by the COVID-19 pandemic. Before Parliament implemented a five-week closure on March 13, 2020, the Canada–United States–Mexico Agreement Implementation Act was given all three Senate readings and royal assent in one day, the only non-appropriation bill adopted before the closure.

However, Parliament reconvened for one day, on March 24, 2020, to introduce and adopt the COVID-19 Emergency Response Act (Bill C-13) with unanimous consent. Among other provisions, the bill doubled the GST/HST credit for the 2019 tax year, added $300 to the May 2020 Canada Child Benefit, paused (for 6 months) repayments of Canada Student Loans, immediately transferred $500 million to the provinces, amended the Patent Act to allow government to use a patented invention without the permission until September 30 to respond to a public health emergency, and enacted the Canada Emergency Response Benefit Act and the Public Health Events of National Concern Payments Act. They again reconvened for one day, on April 11, for the COVID-19 Emergency Response Act, No. 2 (Bill C-14) which replaced the previous bill's temporary wage subsidies with the expanded Canada Emergency Wage Subsidy program and extended it to September 30. Similarly, the House of Commons reconvened on April 29 and the Senate on May 1 for the Canada Emergency Student Benefit Act (Bill C-15) to create the Canada Emergency Student Benefit and the Canada Student Service Grant. After a failed attempt in June, Parliament met again between July 20–22 for An Act respecting further COVID-19 measures (Bill C-20) which further extended and amended the Canada Emergency Wage Subsidy, provided a one-time $600 payment to persons with disabilities, and enacted the Time Limits and Other Periods Act (COVID-19).

During that time, in spring and summer 2020, the Liberal Party had three Members of Parliament resign and the Conservative Party elected a new leader. Initiated after Andrew Scheer's December 2019 announcement of his impending resignation as leader, the Conservative Party leadership election resulted in Durham MP Erin O'Toole becoming the new party leader as of August 24. Marwan Tabbara of Kitchener South-Hespeler changed his affiliation to Independent in June upon the news release that the Guelph Police Service had charged him with counts of assault, criminal harassment, breaking and entering and committing an indictable offence relating to an incident that occurred in April. Effective September 1, York Centre MP Michael Levitt resigned to become president and CEO of the Canadian Friends of Simon Wiesenthal Centre for Holocaust Studies. Effective August 17, Toronto Centre MP Bill Morneau resigned from his position as Canadian Finance Minister and his seat in Parliament reportedly due to his role in the WE Charity controversy and disagreements with Prime Minister Justin Trudeau over spending federal funds on managing COVID-19's economic impact. The next day, upon naming Chrystia Freeland to replace Morneau as Finance Minister, the Prime Minister prorogued Parliament, ending the first session.

=== First prorogation ===
On 18 August 2020, Trudeau asked Governor-General Julie Payette to prorogue Parliament; she acceded to his request.

On September 18, 2020, Minister of Health Patty Hajdu accepted the resignation of Tina Namiesniowski, who was up until then president of the PHAC. Namiesniowski resigned 17 months into her five-year tenure, which had begun on May 6, 2019. Her resignation followed the resignation of Sally Thornton, Vice-president of the Health Security Infrastructure Branch who had been in charge of the pandemic early warning system and emergency stockpile, and who had resigned earlier in the week. Namiesniowski, who had been appointed as a "senior official" in the Privy Council Office, was replaced three days later by Iain Stewart, who was formerly at the NRC.

=== Second session ===
On September 23, 2020, Parliament resumed with a new throne speech read by Governor General Payette. During this second session, Payette would resign following a workplace review of Rideau Hall. The throne speech was followed by a separate televised address (at 6:30 p.m. EDT) from Prime Minister Trudeau. At the time of the speech, both the Leader of the Opposition O'Toole and Bloc Québécois leader Yves-François Blanchet were in quarantine after being infected with COVID earlier in the month. The first two bills adopted (Bills C-4 and C-9), as well as Bill C-14 and C-24, provided further federal aid related to COVID-19. With the Canada Emergency Response Benefit ending, the bills created the Canada Recovery Benefit as an income support for those not eligible for employment insurance, in addition to the Canada Recovery Caregiving Benefit, the Canada Recovery Sickness Benefit and the Canada Emergency Rent Subsidy, and the bills extended the Canada Emergency Wage Subsidy to June 2021. Bill C-14 directly transferred funds for Covid-related measures.

Bill C-30 implemented the legislative items from the 2021 budget, including additional COVID-19 aid in the form of creating the Canada Recovery Hiring Program, extending both the Canada Emergency Wage Subsidy and Canada Emergency Rent Subsidy to the end of September, extending the Canada Recovery Benefit at a reduced rate, transferring $1 billion to provinces to help implement their immunization plans, and pausing the applicability of interest on federal student and apprentice loans to March 2023; Old Age Security was increased by 10% with a one-time payment of $500; the federal minimum wage was increased to $15.00 per hour; face masks and shields were added to the list of products exempted from GST/HST; GST/HST was made applicable to payments to foreign digital products or services such as streaming subscriptions or short-term accommodations; the Canada Health Transfer was increased by $4 billion. In addition, the same bill provided $2.2 billion in additional payments for infrastructure projects funded through the Gas Tax Fund while renaming it the Canada Community-Building Fund, provided $3 billion to the Hibernia project, increased the number of judges on federal courts, and reduced the number of hours (or the amount of earnings from self-employment) required to qualify for unemployment benefits. It also enacted the new Retail Payment Activities Act to regulate payment service providers.

Addressing the federal government's relationship with Indigenous peoples, Bill C-15 adopted the United Nations Declaration on the Rights of Indigenous Peoples Act, while Bills C-5 and C-8 enacted call to actions 80 and 94 of the Truth and Reconciliation Commission making September 30 a public holiday titled National Day for Truth and Reconciliation and amended the Oath of Citizenship to state "...I will faithfully observe the laws of Canada, including the Constitution, which recognizes and affirms the Aboriginal and treaty rights of First Nations, Inuit and Métis peoples, and fulfil my duties as a Canadian citizen." Other legislation adopted during the second session included Bills C-7 and C-12, both adopted with NDP and Bloc support, to address court findings on the previous parliament's legalization of medical assistance in dying and to fulfil Canada's commitment to Nationally Determined Contributions under the Paris Agreement for reducing greenhouse gas emissions. Bills C-18 and C-29, both adopted with Conservative support, addressed the Brexit's impact on CETA and ended the Port of Montreal strike.

Six private member bills and one senate public bill received royal assent:

- Larry Maguire's An Act to amend the Income Tax Act (transfer of small business or family farm or fishing corporation) (Bill C-208) applies the capital gains tax instead of the dividend tax to inter-generational transfers,
- Len Webber's An Act to amend the Canada Revenue Agency Act (organ and tissue donors) (Bill C-210) allows Canadians to indicate their intent to sign up as a donor through their annual income tax return,
- Kevin Waugh's An Act to amend the Criminal Code (sports betting) (Bill C-218) allows a province's lottery corporation to offer betting on single sport events, athletic contests, races and fights,
- Matt Jeneroux's An Act to amend the Canada Labour Code (bereavement leave) (Bill C-220) extends bereavement leave from 5 to 10 days and entitles employees already on compassionate care leave to also claim bereavement leave,
- Richard Bragdon's An Act to establish a framework to reduce recidivism (Bill C-228) requires the Minister of Public Safety and Emergency Preparedness, within one year, to develop a federal framework to reduce recidivism,
- Sonia Sidhu's An Act to establish a national framework for diabetes (Bill C-237) requires the Minister of Health, within one year, to develop a framework to improve access to information on diabetes prevention and treatment,
- Jim Munson's An Act respecting Kindness Week (Bill S-223) designates the third week of February in each and every year as "Kindness Week".

== Ministry ==
The 29th Canadian Ministry was formed during the 42nd Canadian Parliament and lasted until near the end of the 44th Canadian Parliament.

== Officeholders ==
=== Head of State ===
Office	Photo	Name	Assumed office	Left office
Sovereign		Elizabeth II	February 6, 1952	September 8, 2022
Governor General		Julie Payette	October 2, 2017	January 22, 2021
Governor General		Mary Simon	July 26, 2021	June 8, 2026

=== Party leadership ===
Office	Photo	Name	Assumed office	Left office
Liberal		Justin Trudeau	April 14, 2013	March 9, 2025
Conservative		Andrew Scheer	May 27, 2017	August 24, 2020
Conservative		Erin O'Toole	August 24, 2020	February 2, 2022
Bloc Québécois		Yves-François Blanchet	17 January 2019	Incumbent
New Democratic		Jagmeet Singh	October 1, 2017	May 5, 2025

=== Rump groups without official party status ===
Office	Photo	Name	Assumed office	Left office
Green		Jo-Ann Roberts	November 4, 2019	October 3, 2020
Green		Annamie Paul	October 3, 2020	November 14, 2021

== Parliamentarians ==
=== House of Commons ===
The distribution of members by province was as follows:

Province / Territory	Number of MPs (ridings)	Percentage of seats	'000s persons per MP (est. July 2019)
Alberta	34	10.1%	128.6
British Columbia	42	12.4%	120.7
Manitoba	14	4.1%	97.8
New Brunswick	10	3.0%	77.7
Newfoundland and Labrador	7	2.1%	74.5
Northwest Territories	1	0.3%	44.8
Nova Scotia	11	3.3%	88.3
Nunavut	1	0.3%	38.8
Ontario	121	35.8%	120.4
Prince Edward Island	4	1.2%	39.2
Quebec	78	23.1%	108.8
Saskatchewan	14	4.1%	83.9
Yukon	1	0.3%	40.9
Canada (total/average)	338	100%	111.2

For background on the current representation, see:

1. The representation acts in the List of Canadian constitutional documents
2. Elections Canada's history on the representation formula (including the 1985 Representation Act, but any subsequent acts such as the 1999 Constitution Act or the 2011 Fair Representation Act).
3. Canadian Parliamentary Review's proposal for fairer representation for small provinces (around the time of the 2011 representation formula revision).

=== Senate ===
In the month before the 43rd Parliament convened, two new groups organized under the Rules of the Senate. The Independent Senators Group (ISG), whose members did not maintain membership with any other political party, continued from the previous parliament as the largest organized group. However, 7 of its members, along with 3 Conservative Party senators and one unaffiliated senator, had split-off to form the Canadian Senators Group which allowed its members to also be members of political parties but not be subject to a party whip. Then on November 14, the Senate Liberal Caucus disbanded to form the Progressive Senate Group. When 43rd Parliament convened on December 5, the senate consisted of 100 members, 51 belonging to the ISG, 24 caucusing with the Conservative Party, 13 with the Canadian Senators Group, 8 with the Progressive Senate Group, and 4 remaining non-affiliated. Senator Marc Gold left the ISG on January 24, 2020, to become the Representative of the Government in the Senate. Of those who left the Senate during the 43rd Parliament, 10 had reached the mandatory retirement age, including the last remaining senator appointed by Brian Mulroney, 3 voluntarily resigned and two senators (Elaine McCoy and Judith Keating) died while in office. The Prime-Minister appointment two new senators on January 31, 2020: Judith Keating and legal ethicist Brent Cotter. The next three appointments were made on June 22, 2021: lawyer Bernadette Clement, trade unionist Hassan Yussuff and executive of the Saint John Port Authority Jim Quinn. Another 5 were appointed a month later, on July 29, 2021: Clément Gignac, Amina Gerba and Michèle Audette of Quebec, Mayor of Banff Karen Sorensen, and lawyer David Arnot.

Canadian Ministry

The 29th Canadian Ministry had continued from the 42nd Parliament. On November 20, 2019, a month after the election, the Prime Minister re-organized his cabinet to align with government priorities and replace members who had retired or been defeated. Chrystia Freeland was named Deputy Prime Minister and Minister of Intergovernmental Affairs. Of those continuing on in their existing roles, Bill Morneau continued as Minister of Finance, David Lametti as Minister of Justice, Harjit Sajjan as Minister of National Defence, and Navdeep Bains as Minister of Innovation, Science and Industry. In shuffling existing cabinet ministers, Patty Hajdu became the new Minister of Health, François-Philippe Champagne the new Minister of Foreign Affairs, Jonathan Wilkinson the new Minister of Environment and Climate Change, Bernadette Jordan the new Minister of Fisheries and Oceans, Seamus O'Regan the new Minister of Natural Resources, and Bill Blair the new Minister of Public Safety and Emergency Preparedness. There were seven newcomers to cabinet including Dan Vandal becoming Minister of Northern Affairs, Marc Miller the Minister of Indigenous Services, and Steven Guilbeault the Minister of Canadian Heritage.

With Morneau's resignation in August 2020, Freeland was moved over to become Minister of Finance, with the Ministry of Intergovernmental Affairs being returned to Dominic LeBlanc's portfolio. With Navdeep Bains' January 2021 announcement that he would not be seeking reelection, he was replaced as Innovation Minister by François-Philippe Champagne, with Marc Garneau taking over Champagne's Minister of Foreign Affairs role, Omar Alghabra being promoted to cabinet to become the new Minister of Transport, and Jim Carr returning to cabinet (as a Minister without portfolio) after a 1 year absence to receive medical treatments.

== Changes to party standings ==
=== House of Commons ===
==== By-elections and Floor-crossings ====
Date	District	Name	Party before	Party after	Reason
June 6, 2020	Kitchener South—Hespeler	Marwan Tabbara	Liberal	Independent	Resigned from Liberal caucus after being charged with assault, break and enter and criminal harassment
August 17, 2020	Toronto Centre	Bill Morneau	Liberal	Vacant	Resigned to run for Secretary-General of the OECD
September 1, 2020	York Centre	Michael Levitt	Liberal	Vacant	Resigned to become the president of the Canadian Friends of Simon Wiesenthal Centre for Holocaust Studies
October 26, 2020	Toronto Centre	Marci Ien	Vacant	Liberal	Elected in a by-election
October 26, 2020	York Centre	Ya'ara Saks	Vacant	Liberal	Elected in a by-election
November 9, 2020	Don Valley East	Yasmin Ratansi	Liberal	Independent	Resigned from Liberal caucus after a CBC News investigation revealed she had violated parliamentary rules on nepotism
January 20, 2021	Hastings—Lennox and Addington	Derek Sloan	Conservative	Independent	Expelled from the Conservative caucus for accepting a donation from white nationalist Paul Fromm as well as numerous other incidents
January 25, 2021	Brampton Centre	Ramesh Sangha	Liberal	Independent	Expelled from the Liberal caucus after making controversial comments about fellow MPs
May 11, 2021	Haldimand—Norfolk	Diane Finley	Conservative	Vacant	Resigned
June 10, 2021	Fredericton	Jenica Atwin	Green	Liberal	Changed affiliation in part due to party infighting

The party standings in the House of Commons have changed as follows:

Number of members per party by date	2019	2020					2021			
Number of members per party by date	Oct 21	Jun 6	Aug 17	Sep 1	Oct 26	Nov 10	Jan 20	Jan 25	May 11	Jun 10
Liberal	157	156	155	154	156	155		154		155
Conservative	121						120		119	
Bloc Québécois	32									
New Democratic	24									
Green	3									2
Independent	1	2				3	4	5		
Total members	338		337	336	338				337	
Government majority	-13	-14	-15	-16	-14	-15		-16	-15	-14
Vacant	0		1	2	0				1	

=== Senate ===
==== Membership changes ====
Date	Name	Province	Affiliation before	Affiliation after	Reason
October 21, 2019	André Pratte	Quebec (De Salaberry)	Independent Senators Group	vacant	Resigned
November 2, 2019	Paul McIntyre	New Brunswick	Conservative	vacant	Mandatory retirement
November 4, 2019	Doug Black	Alberta	Independent Senators Group	Canadian Senators Group	Joined new caucus group
November 4, 2019	Robert Black	Ontario (Centre Wellington)	Independent Senators Group	Canadian Senators Group	Joined new caucus group
November 4, 2019	Larry Campbell	British Columbia (Vancouver)	Independent Senators Group	Canadian Senators Group	Joined new caucus group
November 4, 2019	Stephen Greene	Nova Scotia (Halifax — The Citadel)	Independent Senators Group	Canadian Senators Group	Joined new caucus group
November 4, 2019	Diane Griffin	Prince Edward Island	Independent Senators Group	Canadian Senators Group	Joined new caucus group
November 4, 2019	Elaine McCoy	Alberta (Calgary)	Independent Senators Group	Canadian Senators Group	Joined new caucus group
November 4, 2019	Josée Verner	Quebec (Montarville)	Independent Senators Group	Canadian Senators Group	Joined new caucus group
November 4, 2019	David Adams Richards	New Brunswick	Non-affiliated	Canadian Senators Group	Joined new caucus group
November 4, 2019	Scott Tannas	Alberta	Conservative	Canadian Senators Group	Joined new caucus group
November 4, 2019	Pamela Wallin	Saskatchewan	Conservative	Canadian Senators Group	Joined new caucus group
November 4, 2019	Vernon White	Ontario	Conservative	Canadian Senators Group	Joined new caucus group
November 6, 2019	Richard Neufeld	British Columbia	Conservative	vacant	Mandatory retirement
November 7, 2019	Diane Bellemare	Quebec (Alma)	Non-affiliated	Independent Senators Group	Changed affiliation
November 14, 2019	Jane Cordy	Nova Scotia	Senate Liberal Caucus	Progressive Senate Group	Joined new caucus group
November 14, 2019	Dennis Dawson	Quebec (Lauzon)	Senate Liberal Caucus	Progressive Senate Group	Joined new caucus group
November 14, 2019	Joseph A. Day	New Brunswick (Saint John-Kennebecasis)	Senate Liberal Caucus	Progressive Senate Group	Joined new caucus group
November 14, 2019	Percy Downe	Prince Edward Island (Charlottetown)	Senate Liberal Caucus	Progressive Senate Group	Joined new caucus group
November 14, 2019	Lillian Dyck	Saskatchewan (North Battleford)	Senate Liberal Caucus	Progressive Senate Group	Joined new caucus group
November 14, 2019	Serge Joyal	Quebec (Kennebec)	Senate Liberal Caucus	Progressive Senate Group	Joined new caucus group
November 14, 2019	Sandra Lovelace Nicholas	New Brunswick	Senate Liberal Caucus	Progressive Senate Group	Joined new caucus group
November 14, 2019	Terry Mercer	Nova Scotia (Northend Halifax)	Senate Liberal Caucus	Progressive Senate Group	Joined new caucus group
November 14, 2019	Jim Munson	Ontario (Ottawa/Rideau Canal)	Senate Liberal Caucus	Progressive Senate Group	Joined new caucus group
November 18, 2019	Percy Downe	Prince Edward Island (Charlottetown)	Progressive Senate Group	Canadian Senators Group	Changed affiliation
November 18, 2019	Jean-Guy Dagenais	Quebec (Victoria)	Conservative	Canadian Senators Group	Changed affiliation
January 21, 2020	Nicole Eaton	Ontario	Conservative	vacant	Mandatory retirement
January 24, 2020	Joseph A. Day	New Brunswick (Saint John-Kennebecasis)	Progressive Senate Group	vacant	Mandatory retirement
January 24, 2020	Marc Gold	Quebec (Stadacona)	Independent Senators Group	Non-affiliated	Change in parliamentary group affiliation following appointment to Representative of the Government in the Senate
January 31, 2020	Raymonde Gagné	Manitoba	Independent Senators Group	Non-affiliated	Change in parliamentary group affiliation following appointment as Legislative Deputy to the Government Representative
January 31, 2020	Patti LaBoucane-Benson	Alberta	Independent Senators Group	Non-affiliated	Change in parliamentary group affiliation following appointment as Government Liaison
January 31, 2020	Brent Cotter	Saskatchewan	vacant	Non-affiliated	Appointed to Senate
January 31, 2020	Judith Keating	New Brunswick	vacant	Non-affiliated	Appointed to Senate
February 1, 2020	Serge Joyal	Quebec (Kennebec)	Progressive Senate Group	vacant	Mandatory retirement
February 6, 2020	Brent Cotter	Saskatchewan	Non-affiliated	Independent Senators Group	Changed affiliation
February 6, 2020	Judith Keating	New Brunswick	Non-affiliated	Independent Senators Group	Changed affiliation
February 18, 2020	David Tkachuk	Saskatchewan	Conservative	vacant	Mandatory retirement
April 9, 2020	Tom McInnis	Nova Scotia	Conservative	vacant	Mandatory retirement
April 24, 2020	Grant Mitchell	Alberta	Non-affiliated	vacant	Resigned
May 8, 2020	Patricia Bovey	Manitoba	Independent Senators Group	Progressive Senate Group	Changed affiliation
May 14, 2020	Peter Harder	Ontario (Ottawa)	Non-affiliated	Progressive Senate Group	Changed affiliation
May 21, 2020	Pierre Dalphond	Quebec (De Lorimier)	Independent Senators Group	Progressive Senate Group	Changed affiliation
July 8, 2020	Wanda Thomas Bernard	Nova Scotia	Independent Senators Group	Progressive Senate Group	Changed affiliation
August 24, 2020	Lillian Dyck	Saskatchewan	Progressive Senate Group	vacant	Mandatory retirement
September 2, 2020	Marty Klyne	Saskatchewan	Independent Senators Group	Progressive Senate Group	Changed affiliation
September 14, 2020	Brian Francis	Prince Edward Island	Independent Senators Group	Progressive Senate Group	Changed affiliation
September 14, 2020	Patrick Brazeau	Quebec (Repentigny)	Independent Senators Group	Non-affiliated	Changed affiliation
November 11, 2020	Norman Doyle	Newfoundland and Labrador	Conservative	vacant	Mandatory retirement
December 29, 2020	Elaine McCoy	Alberta	Canadian Senators Group	vacant	Death
January 25, 2021	Lynn Beyak	Ontario (Northwestern Ontario)	Non-affiliated	vacant	Resigned from Senate
January 31, 2021	Murray Sinclair	Manitoba	Independent Senators Group	vacant	Resigned from Senate
March 1, 2021	Margaret Dawn Anderson	Northwest Territories	Independent Senators Group	Progressive Senate Group	Changed affiliation
May 27, 2021	Mike Duffy	Prince Edward Island (Cavendish)	Independent Senators Group	vacant	Mandatory retirement
June 22, 2021	Bernadette Clement	Ontario	vacant	Non-affiliated	Appointed to Senate
June 22, 2021	Hassan Yussuff	Ontario	vacant	Non-affiliated	Appointed to Senate
June 22, 2021	Jim Quinn	New Brunswick	vacant	Non-affiliated	Appointed to Senate
July 14, 2021	Jim Munson	Ontario	Progressive Senate Group	vacant	Mandatory retirement
July 16, 2021	Judith Keating	New Brunswick	Independent Senators Group	vacant	Death
July 27, 2021	Carolyn Stewart-Olsen	New Brunswick	Conservative	vacant	Mandatory retirement
July 29, 2021	David Arnot	Saskatchewan	vacant	Non-affiliated	Appointed to Senate
July 29, 2021	Michèle Audette	Quebec	vacant	Non-affiliated	Appointed to Senate
July 29, 2021	Amina Gerba	Quebec	vacant	Non-affiliated	Appointed to Senate
July 29, 2021	Clément Gignac	Quebec	vacant	Non-affiliated	Appointed to Senate
July 29, 2021	Karen Sorensen	Alberta	vacant	Non-affiliated	Appointed to Senate
August 20, 2021	Clément Gignac	Quebec	Non-affiliated	Progressive Senate Group	Changed affiliation
August 27, 2021	Linda Frum	Ontario	Conservative	vacant	Resigned
September 2, 2021	Amina Gerba	Quebec	Non-affiliated	Progressive Senate Group	Changed affiliation
September 7, 2021	Jim Quinn	New Brunswick	Non-affiliated	Canadian Senators Group	Changed affiliation
September 17, 2021	David Arnot	Saskatchewan	Non-affiliated	Independent Senators Group	Changed affiliation
September 17, 2021	Diane Bellemare	Quebec (Alma)	Independent Senators Group	Progressive Senate Group	Changed affiliation

Number of members per group by date	2019							2020																	2021													
Number of members per group by date	Oct 21	Nov 2	Nov 4	Nov 6	Nov 7	Nov 14	Nov 18	Jan 21	Jan 24	Jan 31	Feb 1	Feb 6	Feb 18	Apr 9	Apr 24	May 8	May 14	May 21	Jul 8	Aug 24	Sep 2	Sep 14	Nov 11	Dec 29	Jan 25	Jan 31	Mar 1	May 27	Jun 22	Jul 14	Jul 16	Jul 27	Jul 29	Aug 20	Aug 27	Sep 2	Sep 7	Sep 17
Independent Senators Group	57		49		50	51			50	48		50				49		48	47		46	44				43	42	41			40							
Conservative	29	28	26	25			24	23					22	21									20									19			18			
Senate Liberal Caucus	9					0																																
Non-affiliated	7		6		5	4			5	9		7			6		5					6			5				8				13	12		11	10	9
Canadian Senators Group	0		11				13																	12													13	
Progressive Senate Group	0					9	8		7		6					7	8	9	10	9	10	11					12			11				12		13		14
Total members	102	101		100				99	98	100	99		98	97	96					95			94	93	92	91		90	93	92	91	90	95		94			
Vacant	3	4		5				6	7	5	6		7	8	9					10			11	12	13	14		15	12	13	14	15	10		11			
