= List of senators in the 40th Parliament of Canada =

This is a list of members of the Senate of Canada in the 40th Parliament of Canada.

At dissolution on March 28, 2011, there were three vacancies in the Senate: two in Quebec, and one in Newfoundland and Labrador.

The province of Quebec has 24 Senate divisions which are constitutionally mandated. In all other provinces, a Senate division is strictly an optional designation of the senator's own choosing, and has no real constitutional or legal standing. A senator who does not choose a special senate division is designated a senator for the province at large.

Names in bold indicate senators in the 28th Canadian Ministry.

Incumbencies are as of August 2019, in the 42nd Parliament.

== List of senators ==
Name	Party	Province (Division)	Date appointed	Appointed by^{1}	Left office	Reason
Willie Adams	Liberal	Nunavut	April 5, 1977	Trudeau	June 22, 2009	Retirement
Raynell Andreychuk	Conservative	Saskatchewan	March 11, 1993	Mulroney	August 14, 2019	Retirement
W. David Angus	Conservative	Québec (Alma)	June 10, 1993	Mulroney	July 21, 2012	Retirement
Salma Ataullahjan	Conservative	Ontario	July 9, 2010	Harper	Incumbent	
Norman Atkins	Progressive Conservative	Ontario (Markham)	July 2, 1986	Mulroney	June 27, 2009	Retirement
Lise Bacon	Liberal	Québec (De la Durantaye)	September 15, 1994	Chrétien	August 25, 2009	Retirement
George Baker	Liberal	Newfoundland and Labrador	March 26, 2002	Chrétien	September 4, 2017	Retirement
Tommy Banks	Liberal	Alberta (Edmonton)	April 7, 2000	Chrétien	December 17, 2011	Retirement
Michel Biron	Liberal	Québec (Mille Isles)	October 4, 2001	Chrétien	March 16, 2009	Retirement
Pierre-Hugues Boisvenu	Conservative	Québec (La Salle)	January 29, 2010	Harper	Incumbent	
David Braley	Conservative	Ontario	May 20, 2010	Harper	November 30, 2013	Resignation
Patrick Brazeau	Conservative	Québec (Repentigny)	January 8, 2009	Harper	Incumbent	
Bert Brown	Conservative	Alberta	July 10, 2007	Harper	March 22, 2013	Retirement
John G. Bryden	Liberal	New Brunswick	November 23, 1994	Chrétien	October 31, 2009	Resignation
Catherine Callbeck	Liberal	Prince Edward Island	September 23, 1997	Chrétien	July 25, 2014	Retirement
Larry Campbell	Liberal	British Columbia (Vancouver)	August 2, 2005	Martin	Incumbent	
Claude Carignan	Conservative	Québec (Mille Isles)	August 27, 2009	Harper	Incumbent	
Sharon Carstairs	Liberal	Manitoba	September 15, 1994	Chrétien	October 17, 2011	Resignation
Andrée Champagne	Conservative	Québec (Grandville)	August 2, 2005	Martin	July 17, 2014	Retirement
Maria Chaput	Liberal	Manitoba	December 12, 2002	Chrétien	March 1, 2016	Resignation
Ethel Cochrane	Conservative	Newfoundland and Labrador	November 17, 1986	Mulroney	September 23, 2012	Retirement
Gerald J. Comeau	Conservative	Nova Scotia	August 30, 1990	Mulroney	November 30, 2013	Resignation
Joan Cook	Liberal	Newfoundland and Labrador	March 6, 1998	Chrétien	October 6, 2009	Retirement
Anne Cools	Non-aligned	Ontario (Toronto-Centre-York)	January 13, 1984	Trudeau	August 12, 2018	Retirement
Eymard Georges Corbin	Liberal	New Brunswick (Grand-Sault)	July 9, 1984	Turner	August 2, 2009	Retirement
Jane Cordy	Liberal	Nova Scotia	June 9, 2000	Chrétien	Incumbent	
Jim Cowan	Liberal	Nova Scotia (Halifax)	March 24, 2005	Martin	January 22, 2017	Retirement
Roméo Dallaire	Liberal	Québec (Gulf)	March 24, 2005	Martin	June 17, 2014	Resignation
Dennis Dawson	Liberal	Québec (Lauzon)	August 2, 2005	Martin	Incumbent	
Joseph A. Day	Liberal	New Brunswick (Saint John-Kennebecasis)	October 4, 2001	Chrétien	Incumbent	
Pierre de Bané	Liberal	Québec (De la Vallière)	June 29, 1984	Trudeau	August 2, 2013	Retirement
Jacques Demers	Conservative	Québec (Rigaud)	August 27, 2009	Harper	August 25, 2019	Retirement
Fred Dickson	Conservative	Nova Scotia (Halifax)	January 2, 2009	Harper	February 9, 2012	Death
Consiglio Di Nino	Conservative	Ontario	August 30, 1990	Mulroney	June 30, 2012	Resignation
Percy Downe	Liberal	Prince Edward Island (Charlottetown)	June 26, 2003	Chrétien	Incumbent	
Mike Duffy	Conservative	Prince Edward Island (Cavendish)	January 2, 2009	Harper	Incumbent	
Lillian Dyck	Independent NDP	Saskatchewan (North Battleford)	March 24, 2005	Martin	Incumbent	
Nicole Eaton	Conservative	Ontario (Caledon)	January 2, 2009	Harper	Incumbent	
Art Eggleton	Liberal	Ontario (Toronto)	March 24, 2005	Martin	September 29, 2018	Retirement
Trevor Eyton	Conservative	Ontario	September 23, 1990	Mulroney	July 12, 2009	Retirement
Joyce Fairbairn	Liberal	Alberta (Lethbridge)	June 29, 1984	Trudeau	January 18, 2013	Resignation
Doug Finley	Conservative	Ontario	August 27, 2009	Harper	May 11, 2013	Death
Suzanne Fortin-Duplessis	Conservative	Québec (Rougemont)	January 14, 2009	Harper	June 20, 2015	Retirement
Francis Fox	Liberal	Québec (Victoria)	August 29, 2005	Martin	December 2, 2011	Resignation
Joan Fraser	Liberal	Québec (De Lorimier)	September 17, 1998	Chrétien	February 2, 2018	Resignation
Linda Frum	Conservative	Ontario	August 27, 2009	Harper	Incumbent	
George Furey	Liberal	Newfoundland and Labrador	August 11, 1999	Chrétien	May 12, 2023	Retirement
Irving Gerstein	Conservative	Ontario (Toronto)	January 2, 2009	Harper	February 10, 2016	Retirement
Stephen Greene	Conservative	Nova Scotia (Halifax - The Citadel)	January 2, 2009	Harper	Incumbent	
Yoine Goldstein	Liberal	Québec (Rigaud)	August 29, 2005	Martin	May 11, 2009	Retirement
Jerry Grafstein	Liberal	Ontario (Metro Toronto)	January 13, 1984	Trudeau	January 2, 2010	Retirement
Lenard Gustafson	Conservative	Saskatchewan	May 26, 1993	Mulroney	November 10, 2008	Retirement
Mac Harb	Liberal	Ontario	September 9, 2003	Chrétien	August 26, 2013	Resignation
Céline Hervieux-Payette	Liberal	Québec (Bedford)	March 21, 1995	Chrétien	April 22, 2016	Retirement
Leo Housakos	Conservative	Québec (Wellington)	January 8, 2009	Harper	Incumbent	
Elizabeth Hubley	Liberal	Prince Edward Island	March 8, 2001	Chrétien	September 8, 2017	Retirement
Mobina Jaffer	Liberal	British Columbia	June 13, 2001	Chrétien	Incumbent	
Janis Johnson	Conservative	Manitoba (Winnipeg - Interlake)	September 27, 1990	Mulroney	September 27, 2016	Resignation
Serge Joyal	Liberal	Québec (Kennebec)	November 26, 1997	Chrétien	Incumbent	
Colin Kenny	Liberal	Ontario (Rideau)	June 29, 1984	Trudeau	February 2, 2018	Resignation
Wilbert J. Keon	Conservative	Ontario (Ottawa)	September 27, 1990	Mulroney	May 17, 2010	Retirement
Noël Kinsella	Conservative	New Brunswick (Fredericton-York-Sunbury)	September 12, 1990	Mulroney	November 27, 2014	Retirement
Vim Kochhar	Conservative	Ontario	January 29, 2010	Harper	September 21, 2011	Retirement
Daniel Lang	Conservative	Yukon (Whitehorse)	January 2, 2009	Harper	August 15, 2017	Resignation
Jean Lapointe	Liberal	Québec (Saurel)	June 13, 2001	Chrétien	December 6, 2010	Retirement
Raymond Lavigne	Liberal without caucus	Québec (Montarville)	March 26, 2002	Chrétien	March 21, 2011	Resignation
**Marjory LeBreton**	**Conservative**	**Ontario**	**June 18, 1993**	**Mulroney**	**July 4, 2015**	**Retirement**
Rose-Marie Losier-Cool	Liberal	New Brunswick (Tracadie)	March 21, 1995	Chrétien	June 18, 2012	Retirement
Sandra Lovelace Nicholas	Liberal	New Brunswick	September 21, 2005	Martin	Incumbent	
Michael L. MacDonald	Conservative	Nova Scotia (Dartmouth)	January 2, 2009	Harper	Incumbent	
Frank Mahovlich	Liberal	Ontario	June 11, 1998	Chrétien	January 10, 2013	Retirement
Fabian Manning	Conservative	Newfoundland and Labrador	January 2, 2009	Harper	March 28, 2011	Resignation
Elizabeth Marshall	Conservative	Newfoundland and Labrador	January 29, 2010	Harper	Incumbent	
Yonah Martin	Conservative	British Columbia (Vancouver)	January 2, 2009	Harper	Incumbent	
Paul J. Massicotte	Liberal	Québec (De Lanaudière)	June 26, 2003	Chrétien	Incumbent	
Elaine McCoy	Progressive Conservative	Alberta (Calgary)	March 24, 2005	Martin	Incumbent	
Michael Meighen	Conservative	Ontario (St. Marys)	September 27, 1990	Mulroney	February 6, 2012	Resignation
Terry Mercer	Liberal	Nova Scotia (Northend Halifax)	November 7, 2003	Chrétien	Incumbent	
Pana Merchant	Liberal	Saskatchewan	December 12, 2002	Chrétien	March 31, 2017	Resignation
Don Meredith	Conservative	Ontario	December 20, 2010	Harper	May 10, 2017	Resignation
Lorna Milne	Liberal	Ontario (Peel County)	September 22, 1995	Chrétien	December 13, 2009	Retirement
Grant Mitchell	Liberal	Alberta (Edmonton)	March 24, 2005	Martin	Incumbent	
Percy Mockler	Conservative	New Brunswick (St. Leonard)	January 2, 2009	Harper	Incumbent	
Wilfred P. Moore	Liberal	Nova Scotia (Stanhope St./Bluenose)	September 26, 1996	Chrétien	January 14, 2017	Retirement
Jim Munson	Liberal	Ontario (Ottawa/Rideau Canal)	December 10, 2003	Chrétien	Incumbent	
Lowell Murray	Progressive Conservative	Ontario (Pakenham)	September 13, 1979	Clark	September 26, 2011	Retirement
Nancy Ruth	Conservative	Ontario (Toronto)	March 24, 2005	Martin	January 6, 2017	Retirement
Richard Neufeld	Conservative	British Columbia (Charlie Lake)	January 2, 2009	Harper	Incumbent	
Pierre Claude Nolin	Conservative	Québec (De Salaberry)	June 18, 1993	Mulroney	April 23, 2015	Death
Kelvin Ogilvie	Conservative	Nova Scotia (Annapolis Valley - Hants)	August 27, 2009	Harper	November 6, 2017	Retirement
Donald Oliver	Conservative	Nova Scotia (South Shore)	September 7, 1990	Mulroney	November 16, 2013	Retirement
Dennis Patterson	Conservative	Nunavut	August 27, 2009	Harper	Incumbent	
Lucie Pépin	Liberal	Québec (Shawinigan)	April 8, 1997	Chrétien	September 7, 2011	Retirement
Robert Peterson	Liberal	Saskatchewan (Regina)	March 24, 2005	Martin	October 19, 2012	Retirement
Gerard Phalen	Liberal	Nova Scotia	October 4, 2001	Chrétien	March 28, 2009	Retirement
Michael Pitfield	Independent	Ontario (Ottawa-Vanier)	December 22, 1982	Trudeau	June 1, 2010	Resignation
Don Plett	Conservative	Manitoba (Landmark)	August 27, 2009	Harper	Incumbent	
Rose-May Poirier	Conservative	New Brunswick (Saint-Louis-de-Kent)	February 28, 2010	Harper	Incumbent	
Marie-P. Poulin	Liberal	Ontario	September 22, 1995	Chrétien	April 17, 2015	Resignation
Vivienne Poy	Liberal	Ontario (Toronto)	September 17, 1998	Chrétien	September 17, 2012	Resignation
Marcel Prud'homme	Independent	Québec (La Salle)	May 26, 1993	Mulroney	November 30, 2009	Retirement
Nancy Greene Raine	Conservative	British Columbia (Sun Peaks)	January 2, 2009	Harper	May 11, 2018	Retirement
Pierrette Ringuette	Liberal	New Brunswick	December 12, 2002	Chrétien	Incumbent	
Michel Rivard	Conservative	Québec (The Laurentides)	January 2, 2009	Harper	August 7, 2016	Retirement
Jean-Claude Rivest	Independent	Québec (Stadacona)	March 11, 1993	Mulroney	January 31, 2015	Resignation
Fernand Robichaud	Liberal	New Brunswick (Saint Louis de Kent)	September 23, 1997	Chrétien	December 2, 2014	Retirement
Bill Rompkey	Liberal	Newfoundland and Labrador (North West River)	September 22, 1995	Chrétien	May 13, 2011	Retirement
Bob Runciman	Conservative	Ontario	January 29, 2010	Harper	August 10, 2017	Retirement
Hugh Segal	Conservative	Ontario (Kingston)	August 2, 2005	Martin	June 15, 2014	Resignation
Judith Seidman	Conservative	Québec (De la Durantaye)	August 27, 2009	Harper	Incumbent	
Nick Sibbeston	Liberal	Northwest Territories	September 2, 1999	Chrétien	November 21, 2017	Resignation
David P. Smith	Liberal	Ontario (Cobourg)	June 25, 2002	Chrétien	May 16, 2016	Retirement
Larry Smith	Conservative	Quebec (Saurel)	December 20, 2010	Harper	March 25, 2011	Resignation
Mira Spivak	Independent	Manitoba	November 17, 1986	Mulroney	July 12, 2009	Retirement
Carolyn Stewart Olsen	Conservative	New Brunswick	August 27, 2009	Harper	Incumbent	
Gerry St. Germain	Conservative	British Columbia (Langley-Pemberton-Whistler)	June 23, 1993	Mulroney	November 6, 2012	Retirement
Peter Alan Stollery	Liberal	Ontario (Bloor & Yonge/Toronto)	July 2, 1981	Trudeau	November 29, 2010	Retirement
Terry Stratton	Conservative	Manitoba (Red River)	March 25, 1993	Mulroney	March 16, 2013	Retirement
Claudette Tardif	Liberal	Alberta (Edmonton)	March 24, 2005	Martin	February 2, 2018	Resignation
David Tkachuk	Conservative	Saskatchewan	June 8, 1993	Mulroney	Incumbent	
Marilyn Trenholme Counsell	Liberal	New Brunswick	September 9, 2003	Chrétien	October 22, 2008	Retirement
John D. Wallace	Conservative	New Brunswick (Rothesay)	January 2, 2009	Harper	February 1, 2017	Resignation
Pamela Wallin	Conservative	Saskatchewan (Kuroki Beach)	January 2, 2009	Harper	Incumbent	
Charlie Watt	Liberal	Québec (Inkerman)	January 16, 1984	Trudeau	March 16, 2018	Resignation
Rod Zimmer	Liberal	Manitoba (Winnipeg)	August 2, 2005	Martin	August 2, 2013	Resignation

== Changes in membership during the 40th Parliament ==
=== Senators appointed during the 40th Parliament ===
Date	Name	Party	Province (Division)	Details	Notes
January 2, 2009	Fred Dickson	Conservative	Nova Scotia (Halifax)		
January 2, 2009	Mike Duffy	Conservative	Prince Edward Island (Cavendish)		
January 2, 2009	Nicole Eaton	Conservative	Ontario (Caledon)		
January 2, 2009	Irving Gerstein	Conservative	Ontario (Toronto)		
January 2, 2009	Stephen Greene	Conservative	Nova Scotia (Halifax — The Citadel)		
January 2, 2009	Daniel Lang	Conservative	Yukon (Whitehorse)		
January 2, 2009	Michael L. MacDonald	Conservative	Nova Scotia (Dartmouth)		
January 2, 2009	Fabian Manning	Conservative	Newfoundland and Labrador		
January 2, 2009	Yonah Martin	Conservative	British Columbia (Vancouver)		
January 2, 2009	Percy Mockler	Conservative	New Brunswick (St. Leonard)		
January 2, 2009	Richard Neufeld	Conservative	British Columbia (Charlie Lake)		
January 2, 2009	Michel Rivard	Conservative	Québec (The Laurentides)		
January 2, 2009	Nancy Greene Raine	Conservative	British Columbia (Sun Peaks)		
January 2, 2009	John D. Wallace	Conservative	New Brunswick (Rothesay)		
January 2, 2009	Pamela Wallin	Conservative	Saskatchewan (Kuroki Beach)		
January 8, 2009	Patrick Brazeau	Conservative	Québec (Repentigny)		
January 8, 2009	Leo Housakos	Conservative	Québec (Wellington)		
January 14, 2009	Suzanne Fortin-Duplessis	Conservative	Québec (Rougemont)		
August 27, 2009	Claude Carignan	Conservative	Québec (Mille Isles)		
August 27, 2009	Jacques Demers	Conservative	Québec (Rigaud)		
August 27, 2009	Doug Finley	Conservative	Ontario		
August 27, 2009	Linda Frum	Conservative	Ontario		
August 27, 2009	Kelvin Ogilvie	Conservative	Nova Scotia (Annapolis Valley - Hants)		
August 27, 2009	Dennis Patterson	Conservative	Nunavut		
August 27, 2009	Don Plett	Conservative	Manitoba (Landmark)		
August 27, 2009	Judith Seidman	Conservative	Québec (De la Durantaye)		
August 27, 2009	Carolyn Stewart Olsen	Conservative	New Brunswick		
January 29, 2010	Pierre-Hugues Boisvenu	Conservative	Québec (La Salle)		
January 29, 2010	Vim Kochhar	Conservative	Ontario		
January 29, 2010	Elizabeth Marshall	Conservative	Newfoundland and Labrador		
January 29, 2010	Bob Runciman	Conservative	Ontario		
February 28, 2010	Rose-May Poirier	Conservative	New Brunswick (Saint-Louis-de-Kent)		
May 20, 2010	David Braley	Conservative	Ontario		
July 9, 2010	Salma Ataullahjan	Conservative	Ontario		
December 20, 2010	Don Meredith	Conservative	Ontario		
December 20, 2010	Larry Smith	Conservative	Quebec (Saurel)		

=== Left Senate during the 40th Parliament ===
Date	Name	Party	Province (Division)	Details	Notes
October 22, 2008	Marilyn Trenholme Counsell	Liberal	New Brunswick	Reached mandatory retirement age of 75	^{A}
November 10, 2008	Lenard Gustafson	Conservative	Saskatchewan	Reached mandatory retirement age of 75	^{B}
March 6, 2009	Michel Biron	Liberal	Québec (Mille Isles)	Reached mandatory retirement age of 75	
March 28, 2009	Gerard Phalen	Liberal	Nova Scotia	Reached mandatory retirement age of 75	
May 11, 2009	Yoine Goldstein	Liberal	Québec (Rigaud)	Reached mandatory retirement age of 75	
June 22, 2009	Willie Adams	Liberal	Nunavut	Reached mandatory retirement age of 75	
June 27, 2009	Norman Atkins	Progressive Conservative	Ontario (Markham)	Reached mandatory retirement age of 75	
July 12, 2009	Mira Spivak	Independent	Manitoba	Reached mandatory retirement age of 75	
July 12, 2009	Trevor Eyton	Conservative	Ontario	Reached mandatory retirement age of 75	
August 2, 2009	Eymard Corbin	Liberal	New Brunswick (Grand-Sault)	Reached mandatory retirement age of 75	
August 25, 2009	Lise Bacon	Liberal	Québec (De la Durantaye)	Reached mandatory retirement age of 75	
October 6, 2009	Joan Cook	Liberal	Newfoundland and Labrador	Reached mandatory retirement age of 75	
October 31, 2009	John G. Bryden	Liberal	New Brunswick	Resigned	
November 30, 2009	Marcel Prud'homme	Independent	Québec (The Laurentides)	Reached mandatory retirement age of 75	
December 13, 2009	Lorna Milne	Liberal	Ontario (Peel County)	Reached mandatory retirement age of 75	
January 2, 2010	Jerry Grafstein	Liberal	Ontario (Metro Toronto)	Reached mandatory retirement age of 75	
May 17, 2010	Wilbert Keon	Conservative	Ontario (Ottawa)	Reached mandatory retirement age of 75	
June 29, 2010	Michael Pitfield	Independent	Ontario (Ottawa-Vanier)	Resigned	
November 29, 2010	Peter Stollery	Liberal	Ontario (Bloor & Yonge/Toronto)	Reached mandatory retirement age of 75	
December 6, 2010	Jean Lapointe	Liberal	Québec (Saurel)	Reached mandatory retirement age of 75	
March 21, 2011	Raymond Lavigne	Independent Liberal	Québec (Montarville)	Resigned	
March 25, 2011	Larry Smith	Conservative	Québec (Saurel)	Resigned	^{D}
March 28, 2011	Fabian Manning	Conservative	Newfoundland and Labrador	Resigned	^{C}^{D}

=== Changes in party affiliation during the 40th Parliament ===
Date	Name	Party (subsequent)	Party (previous)	Details
January 15, 2009	Lillian Dyck	Liberal	Independent NDP	Joined the Liberal caucus
July 8, 2010	Anne Cools	Independent	Non-aligned	Switched affiliation to Independent

=== Notes ===
^A Left the Senate after the 39th Parliament was dissolved but before the writs were returned for the 40th Parliament.
^B Left the Senate after the writs were returned for the 40th Parliament but before the first sitting of the first session.
^C Left the Senate after the 40th Parliament was dissolved but before the writs were returned for the 41st Parliament.
^D Was later re-appointed.

== Party standings since the election ==
The party standings changed as follows from the election of the 40th Parliament on October 14, 2008 to its dissolution on March 28, 2011:

**Changes to party standings during the 40th Parliament of Canada**

October 14, 2008 to January 2, 2010
Affiliation	2008			2009																
Affiliation	Oct 14	Oct 22	Nov 10	Jan 2	Jan 8	Jan 14	Jan 15	Mar 16	Mar 28	May 11	Jun 22	Jun 27	Jul 12	Aug 2	Aug 25	Aug 27	Oct 6	Oct 31	Nov 30	Dec 13
Liberal	58	57					58	57	56	55	54			53	52		51	50		49
Conservative	21		20	35	37	38							37			46				
Independent	4												3						2	
Progressive Conservative	3											2								
Liberal without caucus^{1}	1																			
Non-aligned	1																			
Independent NDP	1						0													
Total members	89	88	87	102	104	105		104	103	102	101	100	98	97	96	105	104	103	102	101
Vacant	16	17	18	3	1	0		1	2	3	4	5	7	8	9	0	1	2	3	4
Government Majority	-47	-46	-47	-32	-30	-29		-28	-27	-26	-25	-24		-23	-22	-13	-12	-11	-10	-9

January 2, 2010 to March 28, 2011
Affiliation	2010											2011		
Affiliation	Jan 2	Jan 29	Feb 28	May 17	May 20	Jun 1	Jul 8	Jul 9	Nov 29	Dec 6	Dec 20	Mar 21	Mar 25	Mar 28
Conservative	46	50	51	50	51			52			54		53	52
Liberal	48								47	46				
Independent	2					1	2							
Progressive Conservative	2													
Liberal without caucus^{1}	1											0		
Non-aligned	1						0							
Total members	100	104	105	104	105	104		105	104	103	105	104	103	102
Vacant	5	1	0	1	0	1		0	1	2	0	1	2	3
Government Majority	-8	-4	-3	-4	-3	-2		-1	0	1	3	4	3	2

1. Raymond Lavigne was identified as a Liberal in official Senate standings, but was not a part of the Liberal caucus. Lavigne was barred from performing legislative duties as a Senator due to the criminal charges against him and resigned shortly after being convicted of fraud.

== Honorary senators ==
Henrietta Muir Edwards
Nellie McClung
Louise McKinney
Emily Murphy
Irene Parlby

The Senate of Canada posthumously awarded the title of Honorary Senator during the 40th Parliament to five pioneering women known as The Famous Five. The motion was introduced to celebrate the 80th anniversary of the landmark court challenge that allowed women to hold seats in the Senate of Canada.

The Motion to recognize the women was introduced by Conservative senator Ethel Cochrane and seconded by Consiglio Di Nino. After debate, the motion passed without opposition. This was the first time in the history of the Senate of Canada that the title of honorary Senator was awarded to anyone.

== See also ==
- List of House members of the 40th Parliament of Canada
- Women in the 40th Canadian Parliament
- List of current Canadian senators
