= List of Saskatchewan senators =

This is a list of past and present members of the Senate of Canada representing the province of Saskatchewan.

== Current senators ==
Name	Party	Division^{1}	Date appointed	Appointed by^{2}	Mandatory retirement
David Arnot	Independent Senators Group	Saskatchewan	July 29, 2021	Trudeau, J.	April 16, 2027
Denise Batters	Conservative	Saskatchewan	January 25, 2013	Harper	June 18, 2045
Marty Klyne	Progressive Senate Group	Saskatchewan	September 27, 2018	Trudeau, J.	March 6, 2032
Todd Lewis	Canadian Senators Group	Saskatchewan	February 7, 2025	Trudeau, J.	July 21, 2036
Tracy Muggli	Progressive Senate Group	Saskatchewan	August 17, 2024	Trudeau, J.	September 18, 2040
Pamela Wallin	Canadian Senators Group	Saskatchewan	January 18, 2009	Harper	April 10, 2028

Notes:

^{1} Senators are appointed to represent Saskatchewan. Each senator may choose to designate a geographic area within Saskatchewan as his or her division.
^{2} Senators are appointed by the governor general on the recommendation of the prime minister.

== Historical senators ==
Name	Party	Division^{1}	Date appointed	Appointed by^{2}	End of term
Hazen Argue	Liberal	Regina	February 24, 1966	Pearson	October 2, 2002
Walter Aseltine	Progressive Conservative	Rosetown	December 30, 1933	Bennett	March 31, 1971
James Balfour	Progressive Conservative	Regina	September 13, 1979	Clark	December 12, 1999
Staff Barootes	Progressive Conservative	Regina-Qu'Appelle	December 21, 1984	Mulroney	May 25, 1993
Eric Berntson^{3}	Progressive Conservative	Saskatchewan	September 27, 1990	Mulroney	February 27, 2001
William Albert Boucher	Liberal	Prince Albert	January 3, 1957	St. Laurent	June 23, 1976
Sidney Buckwold	Liberal	Saskatoon	November 4, 1971	Trudeau, P. E.	November 3, 1991
James Calder	Conservative	Moose Jaw	September 22, 1921	Meighen	July 20, 1956
Brent Cotter	Independent Senators Group	Saskatchewan	January 31, 2020	J. Trudeau	December 18, 2024
Thomas Davis	Liberal	Prince Albert^{4}	September 30, 1904	Laurier	January 23, 1917
James Moffat Douglas	Independent Liberal	Tantallon	March 8, 1906	Laurier	August 19, 1920
Archibald Beaton Gillis	Conservative	Saskatchewan	October 17, 1921	Meighen	January 18, 1940
Lenard Gustafson	Conservative	Saskatchewan	May 26, 1993	Mulroney	November 10, 2008
John Hnatyshyn	Progressive Conservative	Saskatoon	January 15, 1959	Diefenbaker	May 2, 1967
Ralph Horner	Progressive Conservative	Saskatchewan North	December 30, 1933	Bennett	December 14, 1964
John Frederick Johnston	Liberal	Central Saskatchewan	October 5, 1943	King	May 9, 1948
Henry Laird	Conservative	Regina	January 31, 1917	Borden	September 30, 1940
Arthur Marcotte	Conservative	Ponteix	July 6, 1931	Bennett	August 18, 1958
Alexander Hamilton McDonald	Liberal	Moosimin	August 13, 1965	Pearson	March 31, 1980
Pana Merchant	Liberal	Saskatchewan	December 12, 2002	Chrétien	March 31, 2017
Arthur Maurice Pearson	Progressive Conservative	Lumsden	October 12, 1957	Diefenbaker	March 31, 1971
William Dell Perley	Conservative	Wolseley^{4}	August 3, 1888	Macdonald	July 15, 1909
Robert Peterson	Liberal	Saskatchewan	March 24, 2005	Martin	October 19, 2012
Joseph Benjamin Prince	Liberal	Saskatchewan	July 29, 1909	Laurier	October 26, 1920
James Hamilton Ross	Liberal	Regina^{4}	September 30, 1904	Laurier	December 14, 1932
Herbert O. Sparrow	Liberal	Saskatchewan	February 9, 1968	Pearson	January 4, 2005
David Steuart	Liberal	Prince Albert-Duck Lake	December 9, 1976	Trudeau, P. E.	January 26, 1991
John Stevenson	Liberal	Prince Albert	January 29, 1940	King	September 21, 1956
David Tkachuk	Conservative	Saskatchewan	June 8, 1993	Mulroney	February 18, 2020
John Gillanders Turriff	Liberal	Assiniboia	September 23, 1918	Borden	November 10, 1930
Jack Wiebe	Liberal	Saskatchewan	April 7, 2000	Chrétien	January 31, 2004
Wellington Willoughby	Conservative	Moose Jaw	October 23, 1917	Borden	August 1, 1932
Thomas Harold Wood	Liberal	Regina	January 25, 1949	St. Laurent	November 26, 1965

Notes:

^{1} Senators are appointed to represent Saskatchewan. Each senator may choose to designate a geographic area within Saskatchewan as his or her division.
^{2} Senators are appointed by the governor general on the recommendation of the prime minister.
^{3} Two senators were appointed under a rarely used regional expansion clause by Brian Mulroney that increased the Senate seats from 104 to 112 on September 27, 1990. For the Western provinces, one designated a division in Saskatchewan and the other in Manitoba. The expansion includes two seats each for the Western provinces, Ontario, Quebec and the Maritimes.
^{4} These three senators held their respective territorial designations from there appointment until August 31, 1905, as senators from the Northwest Territories. From September 1, they held those designations as senators from the newly established Saskatchewan.

== See also ==
- Lists of Canadian senators
