= Federal Accountability Initiative for Reform =

The Federal Accountability Initiative for Reform (FAIR) was a Canadian public interest organization and registered charity whose purpose was to support legislation and management practices that protect whistleblowers.

== Mission statement ==
FAIR's mission was to promote "integrity and accountability within government by empowering employees to speak out without fear of reprisal when they encounter wrongdoing" and to "support legislation and management practices that will provide effective protection for whistleblowers and hence occupational free speech in the workplace."

== History and impact ==
FAIR was founded in 1998 by Joanna Gualtieri, a well-known whistleblower and a leading authority on Canadian whistleblower law. Under her leadership the organization played a key role in the shaping of Canadian legislation on whistleblowing and accountability issues. It drafted the first Federal whistleblower protection legislation brought before the Parliament in Canada, which was introduced as a private members bill. It also provided testimony to the House Standing Legislative Committee and Canadian Senate Standing Committee on Legal and Constitutional Affairs on May 10 and September 25, 2006 in advance of the passing of the Public Servants Disclosure Protection Act. The organization has apparently ceased operation. The FAIR website, which is not longer operational, can be partially viewed in an archive hosted on the Internet Archive Wayback Machine

== See also ==
- Whistleblower
- Government Accountability Project
