= Kitchener South—Hespeler (federal electoral district) =

Federal electoral district in Ontario, Canada

Ontario electoral district
- Interactive map of riding boundaries from the 2015 federal election

Federal electoral district
- Legislature: House of Commons
MP
Matt Strauss
Conservative
- District created: 2013
- First contested: 2015
- Last contested: 2021
- District webpage: profile, map

Demographics
- Population (2011): 97,673
- Electors (2015): 72,359
- Area (km²): 111
- Pop. density (per km²): 879.9
- Census division: Waterloo
- Census subdivision(s): Kitchener (part), Cambridge (part)

Kitchener South—Hespeler (French: Kitchener-Sud—Hespeler) is a federal electoral district in the Waterloo Region of Ontario, Canada, that has been represented in the House of Commons of Canada since the 2015 election.

== History ==
Kitchener South—Hespeler was created from parts of the Kitchener—Conestoga, Kitchener Centre, and Cambridge electoral districts as a result of a redistribution process conducted by Elections Canada from 2012 to 2013.

The riding did not undergo any boundary changes following the 2022 Canadian federal electoral redistribution.

== Geography ==
Following the 2011 Census and a Canadian Parliament decision to increase the number of federal electoral districts from 308 to 338, Elections Canada conducted a redistribution process that began with the establishment of Electoral Boundaries Commissions for each province in 2012. As a result of the work of the Electoral Boundaries Commission for the province of Ontario, which was concluded in July 2013, the Kitchener South—Hespeler district was created from parts of the Kitchener—Conestoga, Kitchener Centre, and Cambridge electoral districts.

The new Kitchener South—Hespeler electoral district includes:

- The portion of the City of Cambridge lying northerly of Ontario Highway 401
- The portion of the City of Kitchener lying:
  - Southerly of the Conestoga Parkway
  - Easterly of Fischer-Hallman Road
  - Westerly of Ontario Highway 8 between the Conestoga Parkway and Fairway Road
  - Westerly of the border between the cities of Cambridge and Kitchener between Fairway Road and Ontario Highway 401

== Demographics ==
According to the 2021 Canadian census

Ethnic groups: 63.5% White, 13.3% South Asian, 5.9% Black, 3.2% Latin American, 2.6% Indigenous, 2.0% Southeast Asian, 2.0% Arab, 1.7% Chinese, 1.5% Filipino, 1.4% West Asian

Languages: 65.6% English, 3.4% Punjabi, 2.6% Spanish, 1.8% Arabic, 1.5% Portuguese, 1.3% Gujarati, 1.3% Urdu, 1.1% Serbian, 1.1% Romanian, 1.0% Polish, 1.0% French

Religions: 52.0% Christian (23.8% Catholic, 3.5% Christian Orthodox, 2.8% Anglican, 2.2% United Church, 2.2% Lutheran, 1.8% Baptist, 1.8% Pentecostal, 1.7% Presbyterian, 12.2% Other), 7.8% Muslim, 4.7% Hindu, 4.1% Sikh, 1.0% Buddhist, 29.4% None

Median income: $42,800 (2020)

Average income: $53,600 (2020)

== Members of Parliament ==
Parliament	Years	Member	Party
Kitchener South—Hespeler; Riding created from Cambridge, Kitchener Centre, and Kitchener—Conestoga
42nd	2015–2019	Marwan Tabbara	Liberal
43rd	2019–2020	Marwan Tabbara	Liberal
43rd	2020–2021	Marwan Tabbara	Independent
44th	2021–2025	Valerie Bradford	Liberal
45th	2025–present	Matt Strauss	Conservative

== Electoral history ==
Graph of election results in Kitchener South—Hespeler (minor parties that never got 2% of the vote or didn't run consistently are omitted)

2025 Canadian federal election
Party	Candidate	Votes	%	±%	Expenditures
Conservative	Matt Strauss	28,973	47.9	+12.41	
Liberal	Valerie Bradford	27,945	46.2	+8.80	
New Democratic	Lorne Bruce	1,823	3.0	–13.27	
Green	Ethan Russell	1,208	2.0	–1.44	
People's	Randall Williams	386	0.6	–6.11	
United	Kathleen Dueck	96	0.2	N/A	
Total valid votes/expense limit		60,431	99.4	+0.3	
Total rejected ballots		360	0.6	-0.3	
Turnout		60,791	70.4	+8.4	
Eligible voters		86,338			
Conservative gain from Liberal		Swing		+1.81	
Source: Elections Canada

2021 Canadian federal election
Party	Candidate	Votes	%	±%	Expenditures
Liberal	Valerie Bradford	18,596	37.5	-2.7	$72,079.16
Conservative	Tyler Calver	17,649	35.5	+2.0	$90,043.50
New Democratic	Suresh Arangath	8,079	16.3	+3.0	$10,706.94
People's	Melissa Baumgaetner	3,351	6.7	+4.8	$4.497.35
Green	Gabe Rose	1,710	3.4	-7.5	$530.30
Independent	C.A. Morrison	119	0.2	N/A	$0.00
Rhinoceros	Stephen Davis	93	0.2	N/A	$0.00
Marxist–Leninist	Elaine Baetz	57	0.1	±0.0	$0.00
Total valid votes		49,654	99.1		
Total rejected ballots		474	0.9		
Turnout		50,128	62.0		
Eligible voters		80,885			
Liberal hold		Swing		-2.4	
Source: Elections Canada

2019 Canadian federal election
Party	Candidate	Votes	%	±%	Expenditures
Liberal	Marwan Tabbara	20,986	40.18	-2.09	$106,706.58
Conservative	Alan Keeso	17,480	33.47	-2.26	none listed
New Democratic	Wasai Rahimi	6,945	13.30	-2.26	none listed
Green	David Weber	5,671	10.86	+7.16	$7,620.10
People's	Joseph Todd	1,005	1.92		none listed
Veterans Coalition	Matthew Correia	90	0.17		$312.71
Marxist–Leninist	Elaine Baetz	56	0.11	-0.08	$0.00
Total valid votes/expense limit		52,233	99.25		
Total rejected ballots		395	0.75	+0.21	
Turnout		52,628	65.66	-0.25	
Eligible voters		80,150			
Liberal hold		Swing		+0.56	
Source: Elections Canada

2015 Canadian federal election
Party	Candidate	Votes	%	±%	Expenditures
Liberal	Marwan Tabbara	20,215	42.27	+23.34	$69,489.97
Conservative	Marian Gagné	17,544	36.68	-14.51	$97,214.81
New Democratic	Lorne Bruce	7,440	15.56	-10.21	$3,785.97
Green	David Weber	1,767	3.69	-0.31	$2,785.51
Libertarian	Nathan Lajeunesse	772	1.61	–	$1,761.68
Marxist–Leninist	Elaine Baetz	91	0.19	–	–
Total valid votes/Expense limit		47,829	99.46		$205,534.07
Total rejected ballots		259	0.54	–	
Turnout		48,088	65.92	–	
Eligible voters		72,953			
Liberal notional gain from Conservative		Swing		+18.93%	
Source: Elections Canada

2011 federal election redistributed results
Party	Vote	%
Conservative	20,304	51.19
New Democratic	10,219	25.76
Liberal	7,506	18.92
Green	1,587	4.00
Others	47	0.12

== See also ==
- Kitchener South—Hespeler (provincial electoral district)
- List of Canadian electoral districts
- Historical federal electoral districts of Canada
