= Valerie Bradford =

Canadian politician

Member of Parliament for Kitchener South—Hespeler
- In office September 20, 2021 – March 23, 2025
- Preceded by: Marwan Tabbara
- Succeeded by: Matt Strauss

Personal details
- Born: July 22, 1953 (age 73)
- Party: Liberal
- Children: 3, including Brad
- Education: Humber College
- Occupation: Politician

Valerie Bradford is a Canadian politician who was elected to represent the riding of Kitchener South—Hespeler in the House of Commons of Canada in the 2021 Canadian federal election. She is a member of the Liberal Party. In the 2025 Canadian federal election, she was unseated by Conservative candidate Matt Strauss.

== Education ==
Bradford received a Diploma in Travel and Tourism from Humber College before completing a certification in Economic Development from the University of Waterloo and completing the Ontario Management Development, Supervisory Studies program at Mohawk College.

== Background ==
Bradford began her career as a volunteer producer and on-air personality for TV Hamilton, Cable 14. She then worked as financial and small business advisor at CIBC until 2005.

Prior to her election, Bradford was an economic development professional. While serving as a Business Development Officer for the City of Kitchener from 2005 until 2020, Bradford was also the Chair of the Workforce Planning Board of Waterloo Wellington Dufferin from 2016 to 2020.

== Federal politics ==
Succeeding Marwan Tabbara, who did not seek re-election, Bradford was elected in 2021 representing the riding of Kitchener South-Hespeler.

=== 44th Parliament ===
Bradford sat on the Standing Committee on Public Accounts, Standing Committee on Science and Research, and the Subcommittee on Agenda and Procedure of the Standing Committee on Science and Research.

Bradford was also the Director of the Canada-Africa Parliamentary Association as well as the member of numerous parliamentary associations and interparliamentary groups.

Bradford emphasized disability support, affordability and the labour crisis as key areas of focus and concern for her constituency.

Bradford jointly seconded Bill C-224, the National Framework on Cancers Linked to Firefighting Act, designed to raise awareness of cancers linked to firefighting with the goal of improving access to prevention and treatment for firefighters.

Bradford also jointly seconded motion M-44, Permanent Residency for Temporary Foreign Workers aimed at creating a comprehensive plan to expand the economic immigration stream to allow more workers of all skill levels to meet the criteria for permanent residency in Canada. With amendments, the motion was agreed to in May 2022.

In the 2025 Liberal Party of Canada leadership election, she endorsed Mark Carney.

== Personal life ==
Bradford grew up on a dairy farm in Dunnville, Ontario. In 1971, she was a finalist at the Ontario Dairy Princess competition.

Bradford raised three children as a single mother. Her children are Allison, Ian, and former Toronto city councillor Brad Bradford.

== Electoral record ==
2025 Canadian federal election: Kitchener South—Hespeler
Party	Candidate	Votes	%	±%	Expenditures
Conservative	Matt Strauss	28,973	47.94	+12.40	$130,717.53
Liberal	Valerie Bradford	27,945	46.24	+8.79	$114,390.87
New Democratic	Lorne Bruce	1,823	3.02	–13.25	$22.50
Green	Ethan Russell	1,208	2.00	–1.44	$0.00
People's	Randall Williams	386	0.64	–6.11	$6,598.29
United	Kathleen Dueck	96	0.16	N/A	$760.63
Total valid votes/expense limit		60,431	99.41	+0.36	$132,259.19
Total rejected ballots		360	0.59	–0.36	
Turnout		60,791	70.41	+8.41	
Eligible voters		86,338			
Conservative gain from Liberal		Swing		+1.81	
Source: Elections Canada

2021 Canadian federal election: Kitchener South—Hespeler
Party	Candidate	Votes	%	±%	Expenditures
Liberal	Valerie Bradford	18,596	37.5	-2.7	$72,079.16
Conservative	Tyler Calver	17,649	35.5	+2.0	$90,043.50
New Democratic	Suresh Arangath	8,079	16.3	+3.0	$10,706.94
People's	Melissa Baumgaetner	3,351	6.7	+4.8	$4.497.35
Green	Gabe Rose	1,710	3.4	-7.5	$530.30
Independent	C.A. Morrison	119	0.2	N/A	$0.00
Rhinoceros	Stephen Davis	93	0.2	N/A	$0.00
Marxist–Leninist	Elaine Baetz	57	0.1	±0.0	$0.00
Total valid votes		49,654	99.1		
Total rejected ballots		474	0.9		
Turnout		50,128	62.0		
Eligible voters		80,885			
Liberal hold		Swing		-2.4	
Source: Elections Canada
