= Thomas Harold Wood =

Canadian politician

The Honourable Thomas Harold Wood

Canadian Senator from Saskatchewan
- In office 1949–1965
- Appointed by: Louis St. Laurent

Personal details
- Born: 11 June 1889 Marton, Chirburg, England
- Died: 26 November 1965 (aged 76)
- Party: Liberal
- Occupation: Businessman

Thomas Harold Wood (11 June 1889 – 26 November 1965) was a Canadian Senator. A Liberal, he was appointed to the Senate of Canada on 25 January 1949 on the recommendation of Louis St-Laurent. He represented the Senate division of Regina, Saskatchewan until his death.
