= Amina Gerba =

Cameroonian-Canadian entrepreneur (born 1961)

The Honourable Amina Gerba CQ
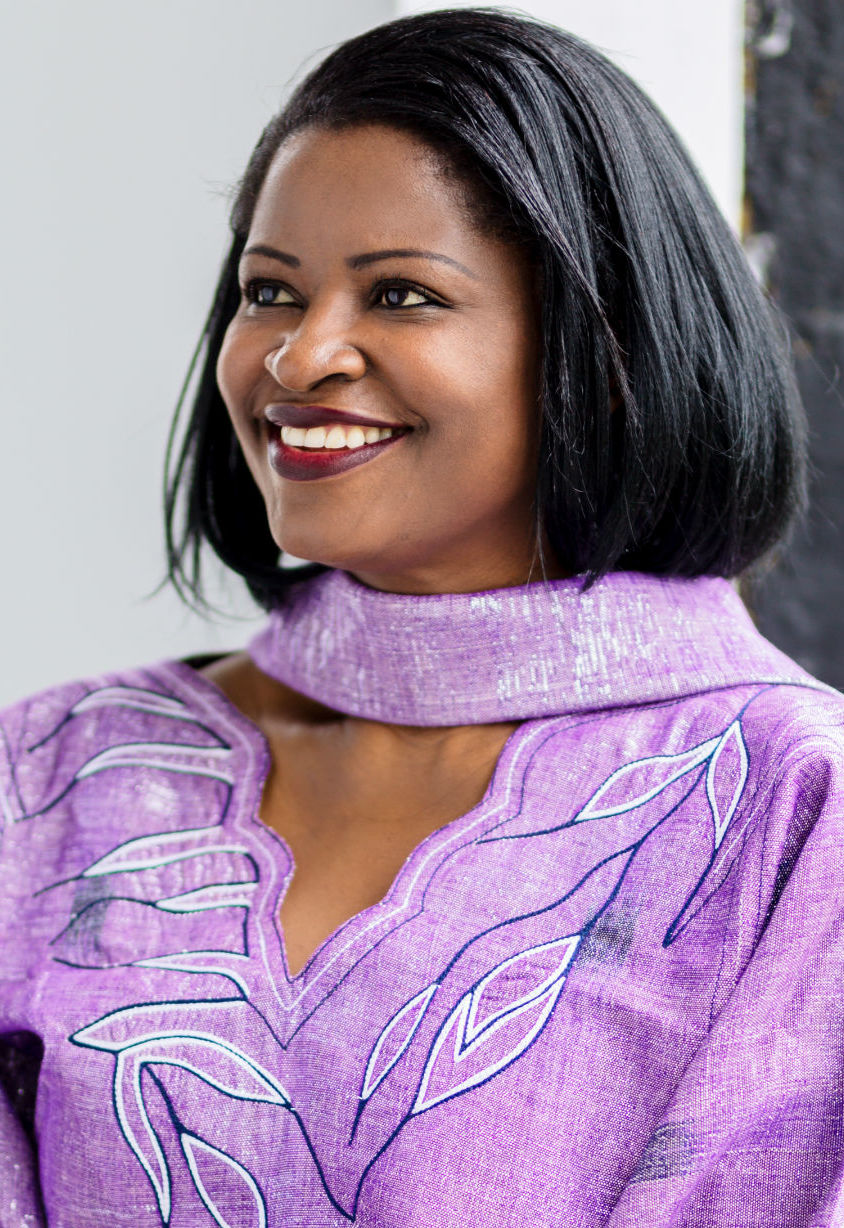
- Gerba in 2018

Canadian Senator from Rigaud
- Incumbent
- Assumed office July 29, 2021
- Nominated by: Justin Trudeau
- Appointed by: Mary Simon

Personal details
- Born: March 14, 1961 (age 65) Bafia, Cameroon
- Party: Progressive Senate Group
- Education: University of Quebec at Montreal (MBA)
- Occupation: Entrepreneur
- Awards: National Order of Quebec
- Website: aminagerba.com

Amina Gerba CQ (born March 14, 1961) is a Cameroonian-Canadian businesswoman and entrepreneur. She is the founder and CEO of Afrique Expansion, Afrique Expansion Forum, and Afrique Expansion magazine. She also founded the beauty care brands Kariliss and Kariderm–the latter being the world's first shea butter product to earn organic certification. In 2014, she was a recipient of the National Order of Quebec. She is a director for the Canadian Council on Africa, African Business Roundtable, and Fonds Afro-Entrepreneurs, and is the president of the board of directors for Entreprendre Ici. In 2021, Prime Minister Justin Trudeau nominated her to the Canadian Senate, as a Senator for Quebec.

== Early life and education ==
Amina Nleung was born in Bafia, Cameroon, on March 14, 1961. She is the eighteenth child in a nineteen-child family and the only girl in her family to attend school. She immigrated to Quebec in 1986. In 1992, she earned her BBA in tourism management (marketing), and in 1993, her MBA in marketing research at the University of Quebec at Montreal's School of Management Sciences.

== Career ==
Gerba was president of the Rotary Club of Old Montreal between 2014 and 2015.

In 2013, Gerba was selected for the United States' International Visitor Leadership Program (IVLP). Starting on March 14, 2015, and continuing for twelve weeks, Gerba set up the first Technovation Challenge in Montreal along with fellow IVLP alumna Stéphanie Jecrois; the program was to promote STEM studies among girls.

On February 23, 2018, then-Deputy Premier of Quebec, Dominique Anglade, and then-Ministry of Immigration, Diversity and Inclusion, David Heurtel, announced that Gerba would head the board of directors for a new governmental agency, Entreprendre Ici. The agency was created to promote diversity within entrepreneurship and to help solve problems affecting entrepreneurs of different backgrounds.

Gerba is a director for the Canadian Council on Africa, the African Business Roundtable, and Fonds Afro-Entrepreneurs. She serves on the University of Quebec at Montreal's board of directors as a socioeconomic member.

As a Senator, Gerba was controversial for spending nearly $22,000 on English-language classes in Vancouver, British Columbia.

=== Afrique Expansion ===
In 1995, Gerba founded Afrique Expansion, a consulting firm designed to help create business partnerships between North American and African companies. She also created a magazine of the same name in 1998.

In May 2017, Gerba set up an international forum under the Afrique Expansion brand in Yaoundé, Cameroon, regarding the strengthening of the digital economy in the country. Numerous delegates came to the event, including Jacques Bonjawo, Ernest Simo, and Arthur Zang, as well as executives from major telecommunications companies in Cameroon such as MTN Group, Orange, and Camtel.

=== Afrique Expansion Forum ===
In 2003, she created a biennial forum called Forum Africa (now Afrique Expansion Forum) to discuss economic development for African businesses. The event has featured several notable speakers including Pierre Pettigrew and Alpha Oumar Konaré in 2009; Daniel Kablan Duncan, Charles Sirois, and Jean-Louis Roy in 2013; Philippe Couillard in 2015; and Lise Thériault, Sheila Copps, Louis Vachon, and Francine Landry in 2017. The World Bank, African Development Bank, and AfreximBank also send delegations to the forum.

=== Kariderm and Kalids ===
Gerba founded two beauty companies based out of Laval, Quebec: Kariderm in 1996 and Kariliss in 2011, focusing on shea butter skin-care and hair-care products respectively. She also founded Flash Beauté Incorporated, which manufactures Kariderm, the first shea butter product to obtain organic certification by ECOCERT. Her companies employ the 2,000 women of the Songtaaba Cooperative in Burkina Faso, who receive a portion of all sales and funding from a microfinance program created by Gerba.

== Awards and honours ==
In 2010, Gerba was named Entrepreneur of the Year by the Gala de Réseau des Entrepreneurs et Professionnels Africains (Gala de REPAF). In 2012, Gerba received a University of Quebec at Montreal recognition prize.

In 2014, Gerba was named a Knight of the Order of Quebec for her role in promoting business partnerships between North American and African businesses and encouraging diversity in entrepreneurship. She was named Personnalité Monde des Affaires de l’année (Business World Personality of the Year) at the 2018 Gala Dynastie awards show.
