= Marwan Tabbara =

Canadian politician (born 1984)

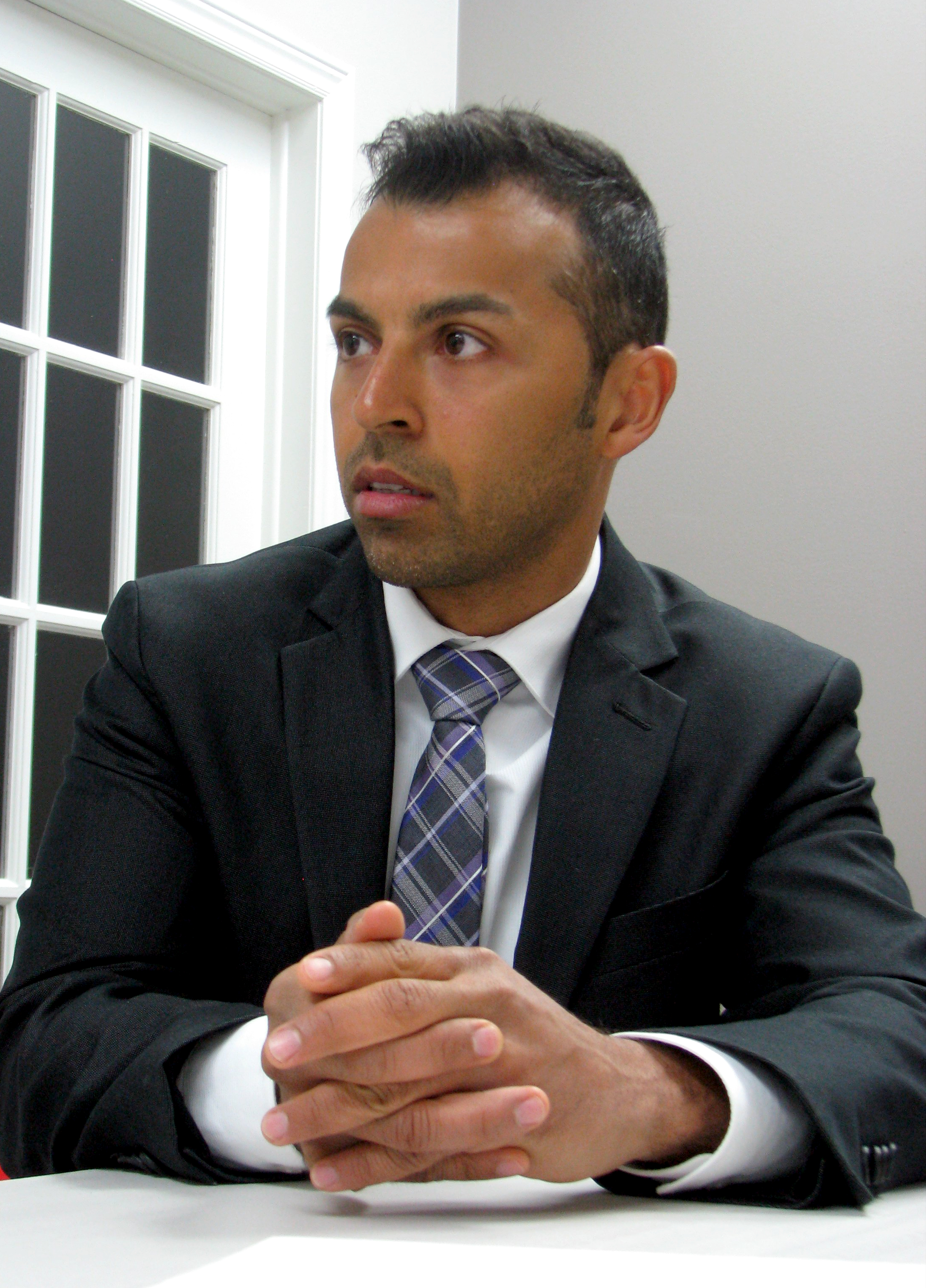

Member of Parliament for Kitchener South—Hespeler
- In office October 19, 2015 – September 20, 2021
- Preceded by: Riding established
- Succeeded by: Valerie Bradford

Personal details
- Born: Marwan Rached Tabbara; August 23, 1984 (age 42) Beirut, Lebanon
- Party: Independent
- Other political affiliations: Liberal (2015–2020)
- Education: University of Guelph

Marwan Rached Tabbara (born August 23, 1984) is a former Canadian politician who represented the riding of Kitchener South—Hespeler in the House of Commons of Canada from 2015 to 2021. He was first elected in the 2015 federal election as a member of the Liberal Party of Canada and re-elected in 2019. Tabbara resigned from the Liberal caucus in 2020 after he was criminally charged with two counts of assault & one count of being unlawfully in a dwelling house. Tabbara pleaded guilty for his crimes & was convicted, though he sat as an independent member for the remainder of the 43rd Canadian Parliament preceding his conviction. He did not seek re-election in the 2021 Canada federal election.

== Early life ==
Marwan Tabbara was born in Beirut, Lebanon on August 23, 1984. Four years later, his family migrated to Canada to flee the ongoing Lebanese Civil War.

After receiving his Bachelor of Arts degree in political science and government from the University of Guelph, Tabbara took several construction jobs in the summer before working at the Frito Lay plant in Cambridge, where he worked as a line technician. He also worked as a field supervisor for a management company doing quality control work within the automotive industry.

== Member of Parliament ==
Tabbara has advocated for the economic development of his constituency and played a role in securing federal funding for a number of projects, including:

- $96 million for Highway 401 expansion
- $110 million to Toyota, creating 450 new jobs
- $7 million to Conestoga College expansion

=== Citizenship and immigration ===
Throughout his tenure as Member of Parliament, Tabbara has been a member of the Standing Committee on Citizenship and Immigration, and chair of International Human Rights.

In his position on the Committee of Citizenship and Immigration, he has helped in adopting several recommendations and legislations concerning the Global Skills Strategy, Family Reunification and reducing wait times. The Global Skills Strategy aims to ease the process for skilled workers to immigrate to Canada. Tabbara has also advocated for increased economic skilled migrants in the construction and trades industry.

=== International Human Rights Committee ===
While serving as a member of International Human Rights Committee, Tabbara has advocated on issues of human rights abuses, with a focus on South Sudan, Somalia, Syria and Latin America. Studies he brought forward in 2017 regarding Somalia and South Sudan raised awareness of the dire need for the provision of emergency food and nutrition assistance by the Canadian Government to over 4 million people at a high risk of food insecurity. His advocacy on the committee has also helped raise awareness to much needed life-saving aid. A study put forward by Tabbara focused on the October 14, 2017, truck bombing in Mogadishu, Somalia that took the lives of 587 innocent victims and injured another 316 people. The Human Rights committee heard from an expert panel of academics on the deep tribal divides, political and economic instability and Human Rights abuses that still reside today.

=== Parliamentary Associations and Interparliamentary Groups ===
Tabbara has served as a member of:

- Canada-Africa Parliamentary Association
- Canada-China Legislative Association
- Canada-Europe Parliamentary Association
- Canada-Japan Inter-Parliamentary Association
- Canada-United States Inter-Parliamentary Association
- Canadian Delegation to the Organization for Security & Co-operation Europe Parliamentary Assembly
- Canadian Group of the Inter-Parliamentary Union
- Canada Germany Interparliamentary Group

=== 2015 comments on the Middle East ===
For the 2015 federal election, during a Kitchener South—Hespeler debate, Tabbara mentioned that Jean Chrétien refused to send troops into Iraq and Afghanistan when he was prime minister even though Canada began sending troops to Afghanistan in 2001 during Chrétien's tenure. Tabbara's statement was challenged by Conservative candidate Marian Gagné to which he replied "So is bombing Syrian children OK?" Tabbara apologized for the comments.

=== Sexual harassment allegations ===
Tabbara was investigated by the Liberal Party for allegations he sexually harassed a female staff member dating back to the 2015 election. An internal investigation into the allegations was conducted by the Liberal Party and Tabbara was approved to seek re-election in 2019. CBC News reported that the party's investigation "determined that some of the allegations were substantiated".

=== 2020 incident, arrest and charges ===
Tabarra and his former partner separated. On April 9, 2020, the situation escalated when Tabbara was arrested by police in Guelph, Ontario on charges that included two counts of alleged assault, one count of "break and enter and commit an indictable offence" and one count of criminal harassment. The court imposed a publication ban on details of the case preventing further details of the charges from being reported publicly.

On June 5, 2020 it was reported that he is "stepping back from the Liberal caucus" but not resigning as an MP after the charges were revealed. Tabbara was jailed and bailed on Easter Friday 2020. Prime Minister Justin Trudeau and the Liberal Caucus were unaware of these charges, as the Guelph Police did not issue a media release. Tabbara's bail hearing was done remotely by a Justice of the Peace 120 km away from the jailhouse he occupied.

Tabbara's trial was repeatedly pushed due to multiple delays, including the COVID-19 pandemic, from its initial August 28, 2020, date. The case was later adjourned until September 23, 2021. On September 24, 2021, Tabbara pleaded guilty to two counts of assault and one of being unlawfully in a dwelling house. The sentence imposed was a conditional discharge with probation for three years with various additional terms, a five-year weapons prohibition, 120 hours of community service, as well as a restraining order against his former girlfriend and the man he assaulted.

Tabbara stated that his actions in 2020 were denounceable and completely out of character. His attorney, Scott Hutchison, informed the court that following the night of the incident, Tabbara sought help by going into counselling for anger management within weeks. Tabbara had no criminal record and no other interactions with criminal justice. Tabbara was under stress because of family, work and the pandemic. His attorney stated that it was as result of these circumstances that he made some very poor choices that evening.

== Electoral record ==
2019 Canadian federal election: Kitchener South—Hespeler
Party	Candidate	Votes	%	±%	Expenditures
Liberal	Marwan Tabbara	20,986	40.18	-2.09	$106,706.58
Conservative	Alan Keeso	17,480	33.47	-2.26	none listed
New Democratic	Wasai Rahimi	6,945	13.30	-2.26	none listed
Green	David Weber	5,671	10.86	+7.16	$7,620.10
People's	Joseph Todd	1,005	1.92		none listed
Veterans Coalition	Matthew Correia	90	0.17		$312.71
Marxist–Leninist	Elaine Baetz	56	0.11	-0.08	$0.00
Total valid votes/expense limit		52,233	99.25		
Total rejected ballots		395	0.75	+0.21	
Turnout		52,628	65.66	-0.25	
Eligible voters		80,150			
Liberal hold		Swing		+0.56	
Source: Elections Canada

2015 Canadian federal election
Party	Candidate	Votes	%	±%	Expenditures
Liberal	Marwan Tabbara	20,215	42.3	+23.38	$68,757.73
Conservative	Marian Gagné	17,544	36.7	-14.49	$96,904.47
New Democratic	Lorne Bruce	7,440	15.6	-10.16	–
Green	David Weber	1,767	3.7	-0.3	$2,785.51
Libertarian	Nathan Lajeunesse	772	1.6	–	$2,129.83
Marxist–Leninist	Elaine Baetz	91	0.2	–	–
Total valid votes/Expense limit		47,829	100.0		$205,534.07
Total rejected ballots		259	0.5	–	
Turnout		48,088	66.4	–	
Eligible voters		72,359			
Liberal notional gain from Conservative		Swing		+18.93%	
Source: Elections Canada
