= Denise Batters =

Canadian politician (born 1970)

The Honourable Denise Batters KC
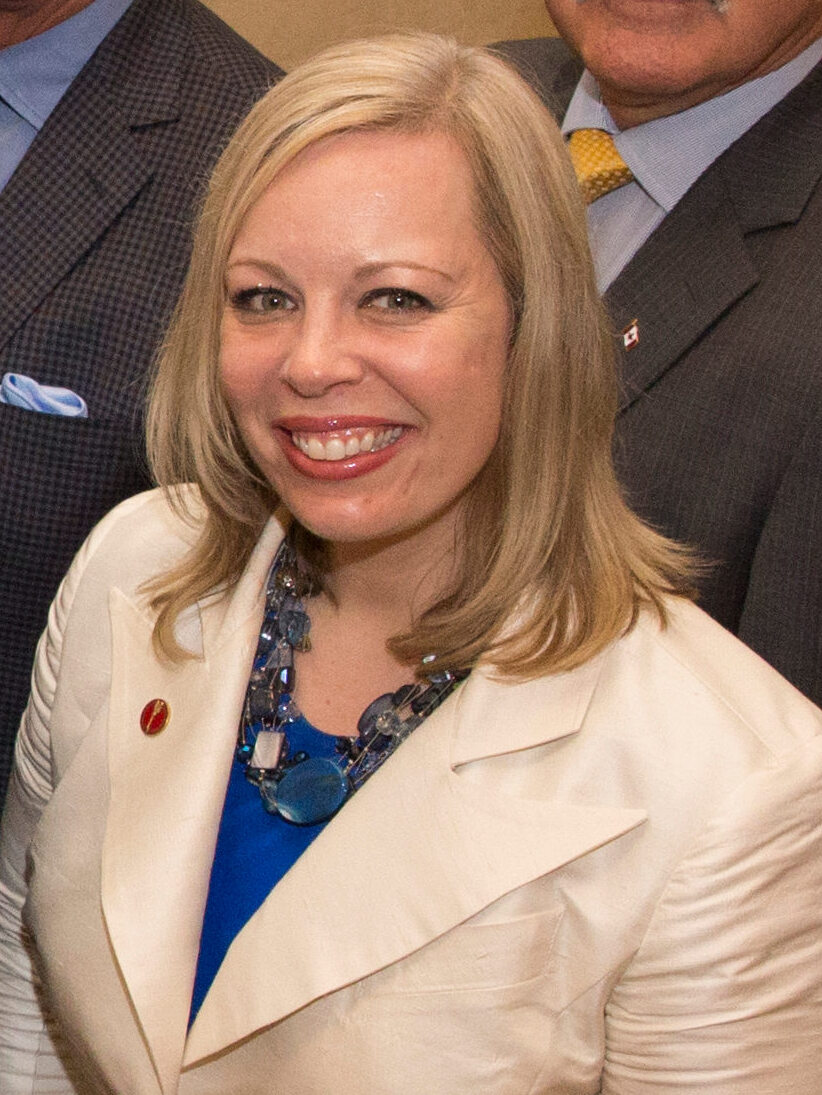

Canadian Senator from Saskatchewan
- Incumbent
- Assumed office January 25, 2013
- Nominated by: Stephen Harper
- Appointed by: David Johnston

Personal details
- Born: June 18, 1970 (age 56) Regina, Saskatchewan, Canada
- Party: Conservative
- Spouse: Dave Batters (m. 1997; died 2009)
- Education: University of Regina (BA); University of Saskatchewan (LLB)
- Profession: Lawyer; politician

Denise Leanne Batters KC (born June 18, 1970) is a Canadian politician who has served as a senator from Saskatchewan since January 25, 2013. She was briefly ousted from the national Conservative Party of Canada caucus from November 2021 to February 2022, after criticizing then-leader Erin O'Toole, but remained a member of the Senate Conservative Caucus.

== Early life and education ==
Born in Regina, Batters received a Bachelor of Arts degree from the University of Regina in 1991. In 1994, she obtained her Bachelor of Laws degree from the University of Saskatchewan and was admitted to the bar in 1995.

== Legal career ==
Batters was in private practice until 2007 and was appointed Queen's Counsel in 2008. From 2007 to 2012, she served as the Chief of Staff to Saskatchewan Minister of Justice Don Morgan. From 2012 to 2013, Batters worked for Saskatchewan's Crown Investments Corporation as executive director of regulatory affairs.

== Mental health advocate ==
On June 29, 2009, Batters' husband, former Palliser Conservative Member of Parliament Dave Batters, died by suicide at the age of 39. In the wake of his death, Denise Batters became a mental health advocate. She organized a number of Dave Batters Memorial Golf Tournaments, which raised more than $215,000 for mental illness awareness and suicide prevention. Denise directed the proceeds of these fundraisers towards the production of a television commercial aimed at men aged 30–50 struggling with anxiety and depression. In 2012, she testified before the House of Commons Health Committee in support of a national suicide prevention framework. Denise Batters was awarded the Canadian Association on Mental Illness and Mental Health (CAMIMH) Champion of Mental Health Award (Parliamentarian) in 2015. In October 2017, she received a "Difference Maker" award from the Centre for Addiction and Mental Health (CAMH) for her work in the area of mental health.

== Senate career ==
In January 2013, she was appointed to the Senate of Canada on the advice of Prime Minister Stephen Harper. Senator Batters served as Deputy Chair of the Senate Standing Committee on Legal and Constitutional Affairs until 2021. She served as Deputy Chair of the Senate Standing Committee of Internal Economy, Budgets and Administration from November 2017 to April 2020. She has also been a member of the Senate Standing Committee on Rules, Procedures and the Rights of Parliament, and the Subcommittee on Senate Communications. She was deputy chair of the Canadian Senate Standing Committee on Legal and Constitutional Affairs and the Canadian Senate Standing Committee on Rules, Procedures and the Rights of Parliament in the 45th Canadian Parliament.

=== Leadership review ===
In November 2021, about two months after the 2021 Canadian federal election, Senator Batters launched a petition for a review of Erin O'Toole as Conservative Party leader stating that, "Mr. O'Toole flip-flopped on policies core to our party within the same week, the same day, and even within the same sentence." On November 16, O'Toole ejected Batters from the national Conservative caucus (in which Conservative MPs and Senators both sit) for "discrediting" the work of the caucus and the leader. Batters released a statement on the expulsion saying that "Mr. O'Toole cannot 'tolerate' criticism."

Though expelled from the national Conservative caucus, which is made up of both MPs and Senators, she remains a member of the Senate Conservative Caucus. However, the Senate Conservatives have excluded her from appointment to Senate committees. In January 2022, the Saskatchewan Conservative Caucus confirmed Batters as a member of their regional caucus. In February 2022, after O'Toole's ouster as Conservative leader, Batters returned to the national caucus.

=== Freedom convoy ===
In Senate, she offered effusive praise for the "Freedom Convoy" protesters who demonstrated in downtown Ottawa from January 29 to February 20, 2022. Batters said that the "chattering classes" had unfairly portrayed the protesters, classifying it as a "dance party." "I can say that in the last two years, I never felt safer walking home from my office at night."

== Personal life ==
Denise Batters met her future husband, Dave Batters, in 1989, while they were crossing the street at a political convention. They married in 1997. Dave Batters served as the Conservative Member of Parliament for the federal Saskatchewan riding of Palliser from 2004 to 2008. After a battle with depression and anxiety, Dave died by suicide in 2009.
