= Matt Strauss =

Canadian politician (born 1986)

Matt Strauss MP

Member of Parliament for Kitchener South—Hespeler
- Incumbent
- Assumed office April 28, 2025
- Preceded by: Valerie Bradford

Haldimand-Norfolk Health Unit Medical Officer of Health
- Acting; September 14, 2021 – April 1, 2023

Personal details
- Born: Matthew Steven Strauss; 1985 or 1986 (age 40–41) Kitchener, Ontario, Canada
- Party: Conservative (federal)
- Other political affiliations: Ontario Liberal (provincial, 2026)
- Education: Schulich School of Medicine and Dentistry (MD, 2008)

Matthew Steven Strauss (born 1986) is a Canadian physician and politician who has been the member of Parliament (MP) for Kitchener South—Hespeler since 2025. He is the riding's first Conservative MP. Strauss was acting medical officer of health for the public health unit (PHU) serving Haldimand and Norfolk from 2021 to 2023. He previously practiced internal medicine and was an assistant professor at Queen's University.

== Early life and career ==
Strauss was born in Kitchener and raised in the community of Hespeler. He is descended from Romanian refugees from the Banat region in the former Yugoslavia.

In 2008, Strauss received an MD from the Schulich School of Medicine and Dentistry at Western University. He received certification to practice internal medicine in 2012 and critical care medicine in 2013. Strauss joined the faculty of the Michael G. DeGroote School of Medicine in 2013, teaching medicine at the regional campus in Waterloo. From 2019 to 2021, Strauss was also employed as an assistant professor of medicine at Queen's University. Strauss served as chief of the ICU at Guelph General Hospital, and held privileges at Grand River Hospital and Kingston General Hospital.

From 2021 to 2023, he was the acting medical officer of health for Haldimand and Norfolk counties in southwestern Ontario.

=== COVID-19 pandemic ===
Strauss has been a vocal opponent of lockdowns, mask mandates, and vaccine mandates from the onset of the pandemic. Strauss tweeted that he would "sooner give [his] children COVID-19 than a McDonald's happy meal," which was criticized when he was appointed the acting medical officer of health for Haldimand-Norfolk PHU. The Ontario Liberal Party called for his appointment to be vetoed by the Minister of Health. In his 16 months on the job, Haldimand-Norfolk went from being second last in the province for vaccination rates to the middle of the list. Strauss ultimately resigned from his position for reasons unrelated to the controversy surrounding his appointment.

== Politics ==
In November 2023, Strauss was announced as the Conservative candidate for Kitchener South—Hespeler. Strauss defeated the Liberal incumbent Valerie Bradford in the 2025 Canadian federal election. He is the first Conservative to represent the district.

In August 2025, Strauss participated in a panel on youth mental health organized by the Civic Clarity Foundation. The event brought together legislators from the federal Conservative, Liberal, and provincial Green parties to discuss policy solutions to the issue.

On August 2, 2026, he joined the provincial Ontario Liberal Party and endorsed Eric Lombardi in the party leadership election.

== Electoral record ==
2025 Canadian federal election: Kitchener South—Hespeler
Party	Candidate	Votes	%	±%	Expenditures
Conservative	Matt Strauss	28,973	47.94	+12.40	$130,717.53
Liberal	Valerie Bradford	27,945	46.24	+8.79	$114,390.87
New Democratic	Lorne Bruce	1,823	3.02	–13.25	$22.50
Green	Ethan Russell	1,208	2.00	–1.44	$0.00
People's	Randall Williams	386	0.64	–6.11	$6,598.29
United	Kathleen Dueck	96	0.16	N/A	$760.63
Total valid votes/expense limit		60,431	99.41	+0.36	$132,259.19
Total rejected ballots		360	0.59	–0.36	
Turnout		60,791	70.41	+8.41	
Eligible voters		86,338			
Conservative gain from Liberal		Swing		+1.81	
Source: Elections Canada
