= Todd Lewis =

Canadian farmer and politician (1961–2026)

The Honourable Todd Lewis

Canadian Senator from Saskatchewan
- In office February 7, 2025 – July 31, 2026
- Nominated by: Justin Trudeau
- Appointed by: Mary Simon
- Preceded by: Brent Cotter

Personal details
- Born: July 21, 1961 Regina, Saskatchewan, Canada
- Died: July 31, 2026 (aged 65) Round Lake, Saskatchewan, Canada
- Party: Canadian Senators Group

Todd Lewis (July 21, 1961 – July 31, 2026) was a Canadian farmer and politician who was appointed to the Senate of Canada on February 7, 2025. Prior to being appointed, Lewis was the president of the Agricultural Producers Association of Saskatchewan and a member of the municipal council for Rural Municipality of Lajord No. 128. He died while still in office, at Round Lake, Saskatchewan on July 31, 2026, at the age of 65.
