= Raynell Andreychuk =

Canadian politician (born 1944)

The Honourable Raynell Andreychuk
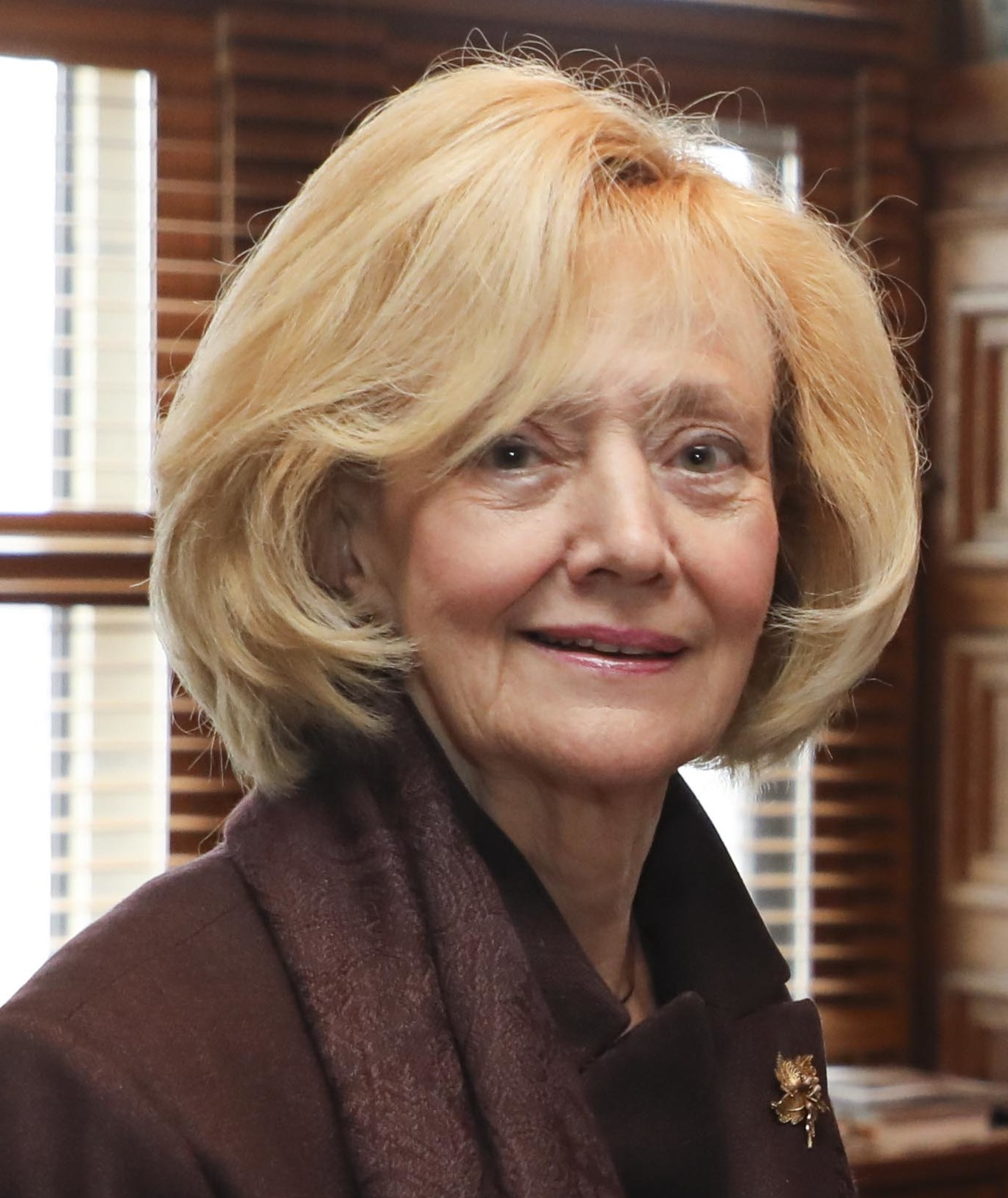
- Andreychuk in 2018

Canadian Senator from Saskatchewan
- In office March 11, 1993 – August 14, 2019
- Nominated by: Brian Mulroney
- Appointed by: Ray Hnatyshyn
- Succeeded by: Brent Cotter

Personal details
- Born: Anita Raynell Andreychuk; August 14, 1944 (age 82) Saskatoon, Saskatchewan, Canada
- Party: Conservative
- Other political affiliations: Progressive Conservative (until 2004)
- Profession: Lawyer

Anita Raynell Andreychuk (born August 14, 1944) is a retired Canadian senator, lawyer, judge, and diplomat.

== Career ==
A native of Saskatoon, Andreychuk graduated from the University of Saskatchewan with a BA in 1966 and a law degree in 1967, after which she began her legal practice in Moose Jaw, Saskatchewan. In 1976, she was appointed a judge of the Saskatchewan provincial court after having help initiate Regina's first family court. Beginning in 1977, she also served as chancellor of the University of Regina for eight years and was chair of the Saskatchewan Institute of Public Policy, a policy research institute created in 2000 by the University of Regina, the University of Saskatchewan and the First Nations University of Canada.

In 1985, Andreychuk was appointed associate deputy minister of social services in the province. Two years later, she was named Canada's High Commissioner to Kenya and Uganda and ambassador to Somalia and the Comoros before becoming ambassador to Portugal. She was also named, the same year, as Canada's permanent representative to the United Nations Environmental Programme and the United Nations Human Settlements Programme. From 1988 to 1993, she was Canada's permanent representative to the United Nations Human Rights Commission.

In 1993, she was named to the Senate by Governor General Ray Hnatyshyn on the advice of Prime Minister Brian Mulroney. Andreychuk sat as a Progressive Conservative until 2004 when she joined the Conservative Party of Canada.

She was also active in the Upper House urging recognition of the Ukrainian famine of 1932 to 1933 as a genocide. In 2008, she was awarded the Order of Prince Yaroslav the Wise.

Andreychuk was one of thirteen Canadians banned from traveling to Russia under retaliatory sanctions imposed by Russian president Vladimir Putin in March 2014.

Having been appointed in 1993, she was, following the retirement of Anne Cools on August 12, 2018, the longest-serving member of the Senate until her own retirement on August 14, 2019.

== Senate committees ==
=== Chair ===
- Foreign Affairs (2010 - 2019)
- Human Rights (2001–2009)
- Aboriginal Peoples (1994–1996)

=== Vice-Chair ===
- Conflict of Interest for Senators (2004–2009)
- Legal and Constitutional Affairs (2004–2008)
- Rules, Procedure and the Rights of Parliament (2004–2007)
- Foreign Affairs (1997–1999)
- Aboriginal Peoples (1996–1997)

== Publications ==
- The work of the Standing Senate Committee on Human Rights: an overview of Children: The Silenced Citizens. Saskatchewan Law Review. 71:23-38 no.1 2008.
- Democracy in the 21st century: Children: the silenced citizens. Canadian Parliamentary Review. 30 (2):2-3 Summer 2007
- Human rights and Canadian foreign policy. University of New Brunswick Law Journal. 45:311-17 1996 (Annual).

Diplomatic posts
Preceded by David Miles Miller	Ambassador Extraordinary and Plenipotentiary to Comoros Islands; 1987-1990	Succeeded by Lawrence Austin Hayne Smith
Preceded by David Miles Miller	High Commissioner to Kenya; 1987-1990	Succeeded by Lawrence Austin Hayne Smith
Preceded by David Miles Miller	High Commissioner to Uganda; 1987-1990	Succeeded by Lawrence Austin Hayne Smith
Preceded by David Miles Miller	Ambassador Extraordinary and Plenipotentiary to Somalia; 1987-1990	Succeeded by Lawrence Austin Hayne Smith
Preceded by Patricia M. Marsden-Dole	Ambassador Extraordinary and Plenipotentiary to Portugal; 1990-	Succeeded by George Loranger Magann
