= Vim Kochhar =

Canadian politician

The Honourable Vim Kochhar

Canadian Senator from Ontario
- In office January 29, 2010 – September 21, 2011

Personal details
- Born: September 21, 1936 (age 90) Lahore, British Raj
- Party: Conservative

Vim Kochhar (born September 21, 1936) is a Canadian businessman and former Senator, the first person of Indo-Canadian heritage appointed to the Senate of Canada on January 29, 2010. Vim Kochhar obtained an engineering degree from the University of Texas and came to Canada in 1967. He acquired Canadian citizenship in 1974. He retired from the Senate on September 21, 2011, upon reaching the mandatory retirement age of 75.

== Volunteer work ==
Rotary Cheshire Homes (RCH) was founded in the early 1980s by Joyce Thompson and Vim Kochhar. RCH offers housing to persons who are deaf-blind. Vim Kochhar set the wheels in motion to develop housing for physically disabled persons. In October 1983, Kochhar and his fellow Cheshire Homes Foundation directors discussed how to build more accessible housing for persons with physical disabilities.

As a member of the Toronto-Don Valley Rotary Club, Kochhar enlisted the help of his fellow Rotarians in organizing the first Great Valentine Gala in February 1984. Over 1,200 people attended, raising over $239,000. Due to the success of the Gala and the need to distribute the funds raised, Kochhar founded the Canadian Foundation for Physically Disabled Persons (CFPDP). CFPDP continues to organize successful events each year, providing support to persons with disabilities. A portion of the funds raised was allocated to the Rotary Club to develop the Rotary (Don Valley) Cheshire Homes.

== Awards and honours ==
In 2014, Kochhar was inducted into the Canadian Disability Hall of Fame.
