= Brent Cotter =

Canadian politician (born 1949)

The Honourable Brent Cotter SOM KC

Canadian Senator from Saskatchewan
- In office January 31, 2020 – December 18, 2024
- Nominated by: Justin Trudeau
- Appointed by: Julie Payette
- Preceded by: Raynell Andreychuk
- Succeeded by: Todd Lewis

Personal details
- Born: William Brent Cotter; December 18, 1949 (age 76)
- Party: Independent Senators Group
- Education: University of Saskatchewan (BCom); Dalhousie University (LLB, LLM)
- Occupation: Civil servant; university administrator

William Brent Cotter SOM KC (born December 18, 1949) is a former member of the Senate of Canada from the province of Saskatchewan. On January 31, 2020, Cotter was nominated by Prime Minister Justin Trudeau to fill a vacant Senate seat for Saskatchewan. Upon reaching the Senate's mandatory retirement age, he retired on December 18, 2024.

== Background ==
Cotter was formerly dean of law at the University of Saskatchewan and was one of the first professors and writers in the field of legal ethics in Canada. He is one of the founding members of the Canadian Association for Legal Ethics. Prior to his academic career, Cotter was a public servant for the government of Saskatchewan and served as Deputy Minister of Justice and Deputy Attorney General and has also served as the province's Deputy Minister of Intergovernmental and Aboriginal Affairs. As of 2021, he supported Canadian legalized gambling.

Cotter submitted an application to serve on the senate in 2018. He has stated that he applied because the senate was less politically partisan than it was in the past, and that he became interested when "changes were made to appoint people to Senate who were more diverse and less politically aligned".

While in the Senate, Cotter was the seconder of a constitutional amendment to remove a tax exemption in Saskatchewan for the Canadian Pacific Railway Company, which passed the Senate and was proclaimed in force as the Constitution Amendment, 2022 (Saskatchewan Act).

He was also the sponsor of Bill C-22 in the Senate, which established the Canada Disability Benefit. In 2025, he was made a member of the Saskatchewan Order of Merit.
