= Pierre-Hugues Boisvenu =

Canadian politician

The Honourable Pierre-Hugues Boisvenu
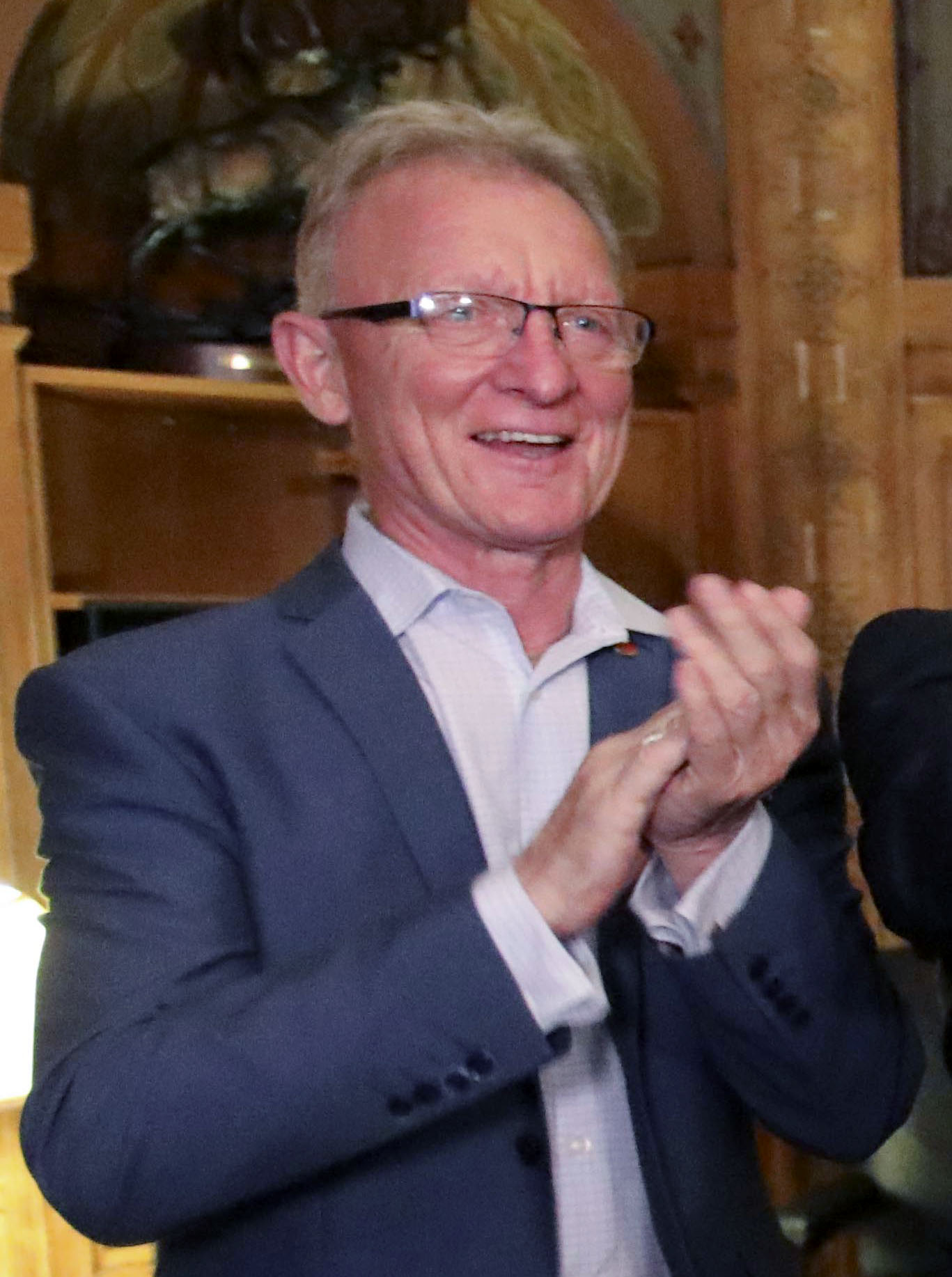

Canadian Senator from Quebec
- In office January 29, 2010 – February 12, 2024
- Nominated by: Stephen Harper
- Appointed by: Michaëlle Jean
- Preceded by: Marcel Prud'homme
- Succeeded by: Manuelle Oudar

Personal details
- Born: February 12, 1949 (age 77) Notre-Dame-de-la-Salette, Quebec, Canada
- Party: Conservative (federal) (2010-2015, 2016-present); Conservative (provincial)
- Other political affiliations: Non-affiliated (2015-2016)
- Occupation: Politician; civil servant

Pierre-Hugues Boisvenu (born February 12, 1949) is a retired Canadian politician and victim's rights activist, who was appointed to the Senate of Canada on January 29, 2010, on the advice of Prime Minister Stephen Harper, representing the province of Quebec under the banner of the Conservative Party of Canada. He retired from the Senate on February 12, 2024, upon reaching the mandatory retirement age of 75.

== Career ==
Boisvenu is the founding president of the Murdered or Missing Persons' Families' Association, which he founded after the 2002 kidnaping, forcible confinement, rape and murder of his daughter Julie. In 2006, the Association that he leads won a battle for the rights of victims of crime with the adoption of Bill 25 by the National Assembly of Quebec. This bill provides better compensation for victims of crime.

He is also co-founder of the Le Nid centre, a shelter for abused women in Val-d'Or, and of a camp for underprivileged youth in Estrie.

Professionally, Boisvenu is a former provincial civil servant in Quebec, and was regional director for the Department of Recreation, Game and Fisheries and for the Department of the Environment before becoming Deputy Minister for the Department of Regions.

Boisvenu has a bachelor's degree in educational psychology from the Université de Montréal and a master's degree in administration from L'École nationale d'administration publique in Quebec City.

Boisvenu served on the following committees: Standing Senate Committee on Legal and Constitutional Affairs; Standing Senate Committee on Transport and Communications and the Standing Committee on National Security and Defence.

He sponsored both government and private Members’ bills: Bill C-37 (Increasing Offenders’ Accountability for Victims Act); Bill C-23 (Eliminating Pardons for Serious Crimes Act); Bill C-310 (An Act to amend the Criminal Code-trafficking in persons), Bill C-316 (An Act to amend the Employment Insurance Act - incarceration); Bill C-293 (An Act to amend the Corrections and Conditional Release Act-vexatious complainants); Bill C-452 (An Act to amend the Criminal Code - exploitation and trafficking in persons) and Bill C-479 (An Act to bring Fairness for the Victims of Violent Offenders]).

On February 24, 2015, he introduces Bill C-32 ([An Act to Enact the Canadian Victims Bill of Rights and to amend certain Acts).

In February 2012, Boisvenu, a key Conservative spokesman on crime issues, stated that convicted murderers should be given the choice of suicide rather than spending life in jail. He retracted the statement after it sparked controversy and later issued an apology "if his comment offended people whose close ones committed suicide".

In June 2013, it was reported that a Senate ethics complaint was filed against Boisvenu. The complaints relate to Boisvenu using his position of senator to influence the clerk of the Senate and another Senator to arrange a job and time off for his assistant, with whom he had a romantic relationship. Furthermore, objections were raised because of Boisvenu's six-month delay in complying with a previous ethics order.

In June 2014, Senate ethics officer Lyse Ricard found that Boisvenu had acted inappropriately by renewing his assistant's contract while the two were involved in a relationship, and that he also violated the code by promising her a two-week period of sick leave between jobs. He then contacted Senate clerk Gary O'Brien and Senate leader David Tkachuk in a bid to have the time off counted as sick leave and not vacation time. However, Ricard concluded that Boisvenu was responsible for "an error of judgment made in good faith" and did not recommend he be sanctioned. In 2012, there were media reports that, after his divorce, Boisvenu continued to charge the Senate for $20,000 in out-of-town living expenses, even though he had left his home in Sherbrooke, Quebec, and was living in Gatineau, Quebec.

Boisvenu resigned from the Conservative caucus in June 2015 after learning that he is the subject of an RCMP investigation into his expense claims. He was readmitted to the Conservative caucus on November 22, 2016, after the RCMP decided not to lay charges against the Senator.

== Alleged links to the far-right ==
In 2017, it was reported that Pierre-Hugues Boisvenu was a member of Facebook group for "PEGIDA Quebec" and the group for La Meute. Although Boisvenu actively participated in both groups, he later said joined one group "by accident" and the other "out of curiosity". He initially insisted he would remain a member, but later left the two groups. Conservative Senator Leo Housakos distanced himself from Boisvenu: "In the case of Mr. Boisvenu, it seems that he's decided to endorse certain organizations that are blatantly racist, and unfortunately that doesn't represent at all who we are in the Conservative caucus."

In 2019, Boisvenu was found to be actively participating in the far-right Facebook groups "Canadian Coalition of Concerned Citizens (C4)" and Yellow Vests Canada.

In May 2018, and again in February 2019, Boisvenu gave an interview on YouTube Channel "Le Stu-Dio", which promotes far-right conspiracy theories, including the 9/11 truther movement.

== Personal life ==
Boisvenu founded the "Murdered or Missing Persons' Families' Association" after the 2002 kidnapping, forcible confinement, rape and murder of his daughter Julie. Boisvenu then began advocating for the rights of victims of crime, especially for the families of murdered or missing persons. In 2004, he co-founded with three other fathers of missing or murdered women, the association.

In 2005, his second daughter, Isabelle, died in a car accident.
