= Paul McIntyre (politician) =

Canadian lawyer and retired senator

The Honourable Paul McIntyre KC

Senator for New Brunswick
- In office September 6, 2012 – November 1, 2019
- Nominated by: Stephen Harper
- Appointed by: David Johnston
- Succeeded by: Judith Keating

Personal details
- Born: Paul E. McIntyre; November 2, 1944 (age 81) Charlo, New Brunswick, Canada
- Party: Conservative
- Education: Université de Moncton; University of New Brunswick; Dalhousie University
- Profession: Lawyer; public servant
- Website: Senate profile

Paul E. McIntyre KC (born November 2, 1944) is a retired Canadian Senator and lawyer who represented New Brunswick for the Conservative Party of Canada. Prior to his appointment, he practiced law in the province of New Brunswick.

== Career ==
McIntyre was educated at the Université de Moncton and the University of New Brunswick before earning his law degree from Dalhousie University. He worked as a lawyer and later in his career unsuccessfully sought a seat in the northern riding of Dalhousie-Restigouche East during the 2003 New Brunswick general election. He was summoned and appointed to the senate on September 6, 2012.

McIntyre served until November 1, 2019, and left the Senate on November 2, 2019, upon reaching the mandatory retirement age of 75. He was succeeded by Judith Keating.
