= Judith Keating =

Canadian senator (1957–2021)

The Honourable Judith Keating QC

Senator for New Brunswick
- In office January 30, 2020 – July 15, 2021
- Nominated by: Justin Trudeau
- Appointed by: Julie Payette
- Preceded by: Paul McIntyre

Personal details
- Born: Marie Georgine Judith Vallee; May 19, 1957 Montreal, Quebec, Canada
- Died: July 15, 2021 (aged 64) Fredericton, New Brunswick, Canada
- Party: Independent
- Children: 2
- Education: University of Ottawa (BA); Université de Moncton (LLB)
- Occupation: Lawyer; public servant

Marie Georgine Judith Keating QC (née Vallee; May 19, 1957 – July 15, 2021) was a Canadian senator, provincial civil servant, and lawyer from the province of New Brunswick, who also had a career in the public service. On January 30, 2020, Keating was nominated by Prime Minister Justin Trudeau to fill the vacant Senate seat in New Brunswick, which had become vacant earlier in the month following the mandatory retirement of former Senator Paul McIntyre.

== Career ==
Prior to being appointed to the Senate, Keating had served in various capacities with the government of New Brunswick, including as Chief Legislative Counsel, Chief Legal Advisor to the Premier of New Brunswick, the province's First Nations Representative, and a provincial chair of the working group on Truth and Reconciliation. She was the first woman to serve as Deputy Minister of Justice and Deputy Attorney General of New Brunswick. She was also, at the time of her appointment to the Senate, editor-in-chief of the Canadian Bar Association’s Solicitor’s Journal.

Keating died on July 15, 2021, at the age of 64 after a period of declining health.
