= Canadian Council on Africa =

Canadian non-profit organization

- Type: Non-profit organization
- Founded: Montreal, Quebec (May 27, 2002)
- Headquarters: Ottawa, Canada
- Number of locations: 4 offices across Canada
- Area served: Canada and the African continent
- Key people: President/CEO: Lucien Bradet, VP, Ontario: Chris Kianza, VP, Quebec : Karl Miville-de Chêne, VP, Western Canada: Frank Kense, Founder: Nola Kianza,
- Services: Business Development Service, African News Clipping Service, Monthly African Indicators, Publications, Networking, Advocacy, Facilitating Obtaining Business Visas, Organizing trade and business conferences, Information services
- Members: over 150 from various sectors
- Website: http://www.ccafrica.ca/

The Canadian Council on Africa (CCAfrica) was created on May 27, 2002 and is currently located in Ottawa, Ontario, with the goal of becoming Canada's leading organization committed to the economic development of a modern competitive Africa. CCAfrica was founded as a result of the Kananaskis G8 Summit, where the agenda included the development of a self-help plan for Africa. Formed a year after The New Partnership for African Development (NEPAD), CCAfrica shares NEPAD's goal of African renewal.

== Membership and member services ==
CCAfrica is a non-profit organization dedicated to Africa's economic development. The organization has over 150 members representing every sector of the economy: education, engineering, infrastructure, natural resources, energy, finance, legal, consulting, communications, information technology, manufacture, agri-food, environment, sustainable development, and health. In addition to active members, CCAfrica has associate members, such as the Canadian International Development Agency (CIDA), and affiliated African members, such as Nigerian Economic Summit Group (NESG) and the Tanzania Chamber of Commerce, Industry and Agriculture (TCCIA).

Many services are provided for members of CCAfrica. A notable service is the Business Development Service (BDS), a weekly publication sent out to members with relevant African business opportunities in their sector. CCAfrica also lobbies on behalf of and represents their members in dealings with the government. A great number of publications are also available to members, including newsletters, reports, briefing notes, the Africa News Clipping Service, and the Monthly African Indicators. In addition, members become part of a network of organizations that are players in the economic development of Africa, can be assisted in obtaining business visas, and are kept informed of various updates that can affect their business dealings in Africa.

== Activities and events ==
CCAfrica holds conferences, seminars, and briefings throughout Canada. The themes of these events range from natural resources and the economy to education and the Francophonie. All of these events seek to provide information to both members and non-members about business and development in Africa.

In addition to conferences and seminars, CCAfrica also hosts political and business delegations from African countries. Furthermore, CCAfrica leads Canadian business delegations to African countries. These help to promote business relations between Canadian businesses and institutions and their African counterparts.

== Board of directors ==
Members

Maritimes

- Michael Wyse, Black Business Initiative

Québec

- Michel Côté, CRC Sogema
- Yvon Bernier, DID
- Robert Blackburn, SNC-Lavalin
- Amina Gerba, Afrique Expansion Mag
- Pierre Boivin, McCarthy Tétrault
- Simon Lafrance, STRATEGEUM

Ontario

- David Ireland, Canadian Bank Note
- David Baron, Cowater
- Marc Sitter, Sherritt International
- Matt Fisher, Anyway Env. Solutions
- Peter Kieran, CPCS
- Nola Kianza, CCAfrica
- Alanna Heath, Barrick
- Andrew McAlister, McAlister Consulting Corp.
- Charles Field-Marsham, Kestrel Capital
- Marie-Jose Fortin, ACCC

Western Canada

- Wayne Dunn, CSR Resources
- Denis Painchaud, Nexen
- Neil Sadler, IRD
- David Gamble, IMW
- John Treleaven, Mercy Ships Canada

Advisors

- Diane Belliveau, EDC
- James Hill, DFAIT
- Shane Jaffer, Government of Alberta
- Alain Carrier, MDEIE

== Canadian offices ==
There are four CCAfrica offices across Canada: the President's Office, located in Ottawa (Ontario), with regional offices located in Toronto (Ontario), Montreal (Quebec) and Calgary (Alberta).
