= David Tkachuk =

Canadian teacher, executive and politician (born 1945)

The Honourable David Tkachuk

Canadian Senator from Saskatchewan
- In office June 8, 1993 – February 18, 2020
- Nominated by: Brian Mulroney
- Appointed by: Ray Hnatyshyn
- Succeeded by: David Arnot

Personal details
- Born: February 18, 1945 (age 81) Saskatoon, Saskatchewan, Canada
- Party: Conservative Party of Canada
- Other political affiliations: Saskatchewan Progressive Conservative Party, Social Credit Party of British Columbia, Progressive Conservative Party of Canada

David Tkachuk (born February 18, 1945) is a Canadian teacher, executive and politician. Tkachuk was a member of the Senate of Canada, representing Saskatchewan from 1993 to 2020.

== Life and career ==
David Tkachuk was born on February 18, 1945, to George and Pauline (née Berezowski) in Saskatoon, Saskatchewan. He had a younger sister named Darlene who died in 2004. He is a second generation Canadian-Ukrainian as maternal grandparents were from the region of Sokal, Ukraine. The origin of his paternal grandparents is unknown.

Tkachuk graduated from the University of Saskatchewan with a Bachelor of Arts in 1965 and earned a teaching certificate in 1966. Tkachuk joined the Saskatchewan Progressive Conservative Party in 1974. He helped build the then-moribund organization into an electoral force that was able to form government in Saskatchewan under Grant Devine. Tkachuk served in the Premier's Office as Devine's principal secretary. Tkachuk also worked for the British Columbia Social Credit Party for one year.

Also a long time worker for the federal Progressive Conservative Party, Tkachuk was appointed to the Senate in June 1993 on the recommendation of Brian Mulroney weeks before his retirement as Prime Minister of Canada.

He served in the Senate as a Progressive Conservative until the merger of the Canadian Alliance and the Progressive Conservatives in 2003, then sat as a member of the Conservative Party of Canada. In March 2005, Conservative leader Stephen Harper appointed Tkachuk to the position of Senate Chair for the party's 2006 election campaign. Tkachuk previously served as co-chair of the Progressive Conservative's 1997 election campaign.

Tkachuk has been chairman of the John Diefenbaker Society since 1992, and was instrumental in arranging funding to keep the former prime minister's papers at the University of Saskatchewan's John G. Diefenbaker Centre. He also serves as president of Blackstrap Hospitality Corporation, and is on the board of Calian Technologies Ltd. He is also active in the Ukrainian community.

Following the retirement of Raynell Andreychuk on August 14, 2019, he was the longest-serving member of the Senate, until his own retirement on February 18, 2020. He was the last remaining senate appointee of the Mulroney ministry.

== Controversy ==
Tkachuk was involved in the Canadian Senate expenses scandal, serving as one of a three-member senate committee whose report was accused of seeking to whitewash Duffy's fallacious claims for living expenses.

Senator David Tkachuk while speaking to the pro-pipeline crowd at Parliament Hill on February 20, 2019, urged the group to "roll over every Liberal left in the country". He continued, "When they are gone, these bills are gone." Given that 10 people were killed in the terrorist attack in April 2018 in North York after being run over by a van, Member of Parliament for Willowdale Ali Ehsassi released a statement which condemned the Senator for inciting violence against Canadians and demanded that Senator Tkachuk be forced to resign and called for his removal from the Conservative Caucus. CPC leader Andrew Scheer, who also attended the event, was criticized for failing to take action against Tkachuk, who has refused to apologize and claimed that he was speaking figuratively.
