= David Arnot (Canadian politician) =

Canadian jurist and politician

The Honourable David Arnot

Canadian Senator from Saskatchewan
- Incumbent
- Assumed office July 29, 2021
- Nominated by: Justin Trudeau
- Appointed by: Mary Simon
- Preceded by: David Tkachuk

Personal details
- Born: April 16, 1952 (age 74) Brandon, Manitoba, Canada
- Party: Independent Senators Group
- Education: University of Saskatchewan (JD)
- Profession: Lawyer

David M. Arnot is a Canadian politician, lawyer, and former judge. Since July 2021, he has represented Saskatchewan in the Senate of Canada. Arnot previously served as the chief commissioner of the Saskatchewan Human Rights Commission since 2009, and was previously a Crown prosecutor, a judge on the Provincial Court of Saskatchewan, and federal treaty commissioner (1997 to 2007). He is a graduate of the University of Saskatchewan and was admitted to the bar in 1976.

On July 29, 2021, it was announced that he would be appointed to the Senate of Canada by Governor General Mary Simon, on the advice of prime minister Justin Trudeau. He was chair of the Canadian Senate Standing Committee on Legal and Constitutional Affairs in the 45th Canadian Parliament.
