= Canadian Senate Standing Committee on Legal and Constitutional Affairs =

Standing committee of the Senate of Canada

The Senate Standing Committee on Legal and Constitutional Affairs (LCJC) is a standing committee of the Senate of Canada. It has jurisdiction over legislation and matters relating to legal and constitutional matters generally, including: (1) federal-provincial relations; (2) administration of justice, law reform and all related matters; (3) the judiciary; (4) all essentially juridical matters; and (5) private bills not otherwise specifically assigned to another committee, including those related to marriage and divorce (Rule 86(1)(k)).

== Members ==
As of the 45th Canadian Parliament:

Caucus	Member	Province
Independent Senators Group	David Arnot, chair	SK
Conservative	Denise Batters, deputy chair	SK
Independent Senators Group	Bernadette Clement	ON
Independent Senators Group	Baltej Singh Dhillon	BC
Conservative	Yonah Martin	BC
Progressive Senate Group	Julie Miville-Dechêne	QC
Independent Senators Group	Manuelle Oudar	QC
Independent Senators Group	Kim Pate	ON
Canadian Senators Group	Paul Prosper	NS
Independent Senators Group	Raymonde Saint-Germain	QC
Independent Senators Group	Paula Simons	AB
Canadian Senators Group	Scott Tannas	AB
Progressive Senate Group	Kristopher Wells	AB

The Representative of the Government in the Senate and Leader of the Opposition in the Senate are both ex-officio members of the committee.
