= Carolyn Stewart-Olsen =

Canadian politician (born 1946)

The Honourable Carolyn Stewart-Olsen
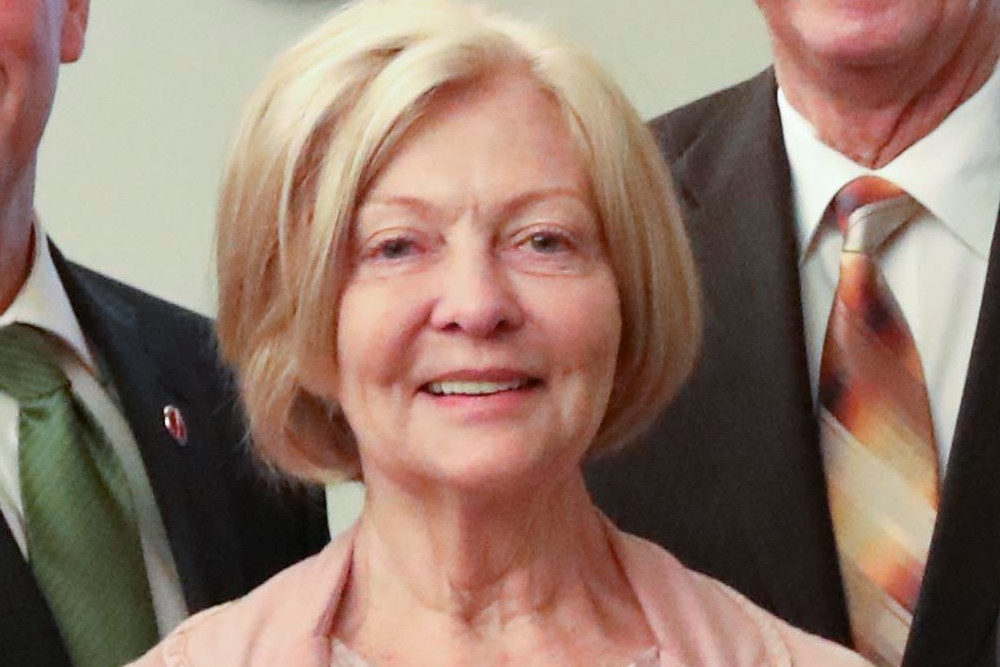

Senator for New Brunswick
- In office August 27, 2009 – July 27, 2021
- Nominated by: Stephen Harper
- Appointed by: Michaëlle Jean

Personal details
- Born: July 27, 1946 (age 80) Sackville, New Brunswick
- Party: Conservative
- Spouse: Terry Olsen
- Children: Terrence Nolan Croucher (grand-son)

Carolyn Stewart-Olsen (born July 27, 1946) is a retired Conservative senator from New Brunswick. She was formerly senior advisor and director of strategic communication in the Prime Minister's Office of Canadian prime minister Stephen Harper.

== Early life ==
Stewart-Olsen was born and raised in Sackville, New Brunswick, and worked as a nurse for 20 years before becoming a political staffer.

== Professional career ==
Stewart-Olsen, a registered nurse by profession, had a twenty-year nursing career including ten years as an emergency room nurse New Brunswick, Ontario and Quebec before being appointed Head Nurse for the Ambulatory Care Department at Ottawa's Grace Hospital in 1986. She later became Nursing Manager for the Emergency, Recovery Room, Ambulatory Care, and CSR departments at Carleton Place Hospital.

== Reform, Alliance and DRC work ==
In 1993, Stewart-Olsen became a volunteer in the communications office of the Reform Party of Canada under Preston Manning, newly settling in as a major party in the House of Commons. She later came on staff as a media officer or press aide until 2000, serving through the creation of its first successor party, the Canadian Alliance and the leadership of Stockwell Day, who defeated Manning for the Alliance leadership. In January 2000 she was fired.

Stewart-Olsen then went to work for Deborah Grey, the first Reform MP and a Manning loyalist, and in 2001, she was identified as a press aide to the Democratic Representative Caucus, a group of dissidents including Grey who broke with the party under Day's leadership.

== Harper's trusted aide ==
In the 2002 Canadian Alliance leadership election, she became press secretary to Harper in his successful challenge to Day, planting a strong reciprocal loyalty between the two that would strengthen through the 2004 leadership race of its successor the Conservative Party of Canada, and Stewart-Olsen's frequent contact with Harper in their work; a 2005 Globe and Mail report said that Stewart-Olsen and executive assistant Ray Novak, "mid-level staffers," were "seen as having his ear, much more so than many higher-ranking staff in the [Opposition leader's] office of about 100."

As Harper's press secretary, Stewart-Olsen survived several periods of significant turnover in Harper's communication staff; in opposition in 2005, amid one such transition, media reports stated that Stewart-Olsen was widely tipped to succeed Geoff Norquay as communications director, but she remained in her position as press secretary.

When Harper became prime minister after the 2006 federal election, Stewart-Olsen moved with him into government.

Accounts of Stewart-Olsen vary widely. On the 2005-06 campaign trail, a reporter for The Record who had been physically restrained from asking a question by a member of Harper's RCMP security detail found Stewart-Olsen "diminutive and soft-spoken;" she defused the situation and arranged a short interview. Calgary Sun writer Licia Corbella calls her "competent and charming".

However, a fellow Conservative strategist, speaking anonymously to the Canadian Press in 2005, said that "Carolyn Stewart Olsen is an issue for a lot of people — her relationship with the leader and her inability to work well with people." Editorialist Adam Radwanski suggested in his blog that she may "reinforce all the leader's worst, most paranoid instincts." In February 2006, after the departure of Harper's communications director William Stairs, the Toronto Star described Stewart-Olsen going to the "unusual lengths of holding down reporters' hands when they've tried to ask questions or shouting at journalists who don't abide by her rules for press dealings. The fact that Harper chose to keep Stewart-Olsen and eject Stairs was seen last night as largely a cosmetic answer to the deeper issue of his public-relations problems and Harper's distrust of anything related to the media." Reinforcing this perception of media relations, in April 2008 it was reported that Conservative Members of Parliament were required to carry at all times a wallet-sized, laminated card entitled "When a Reporter Calls". The card provided instructions as to questions a Member of Parliament was expected to ask of a reporter, prior to seeking permission from the Prime Minister's Office to speak to the journalist.

== Senate of Canada ==
On August 27, 2009, it was announced that Stewart-Olsen would be among nine new appointments to the Senate of Canada. Stewart Olsen became most-visible to the public during the Senate expenses scandal. She was part of a three-member steering committee in charge of the Senate committee on the internal economy. The group came under scrutiny for its handling of a report on Senator Mike Duffy's housing expenses. She retired from the Senate on July 27, 2021, upon reaching the mandatory retirement age.
