= 44th Canadian Parliament =

2021–25 national legislative term

- Minority parliament
- Nov. 22, 2021 – Mar. 23, 2025
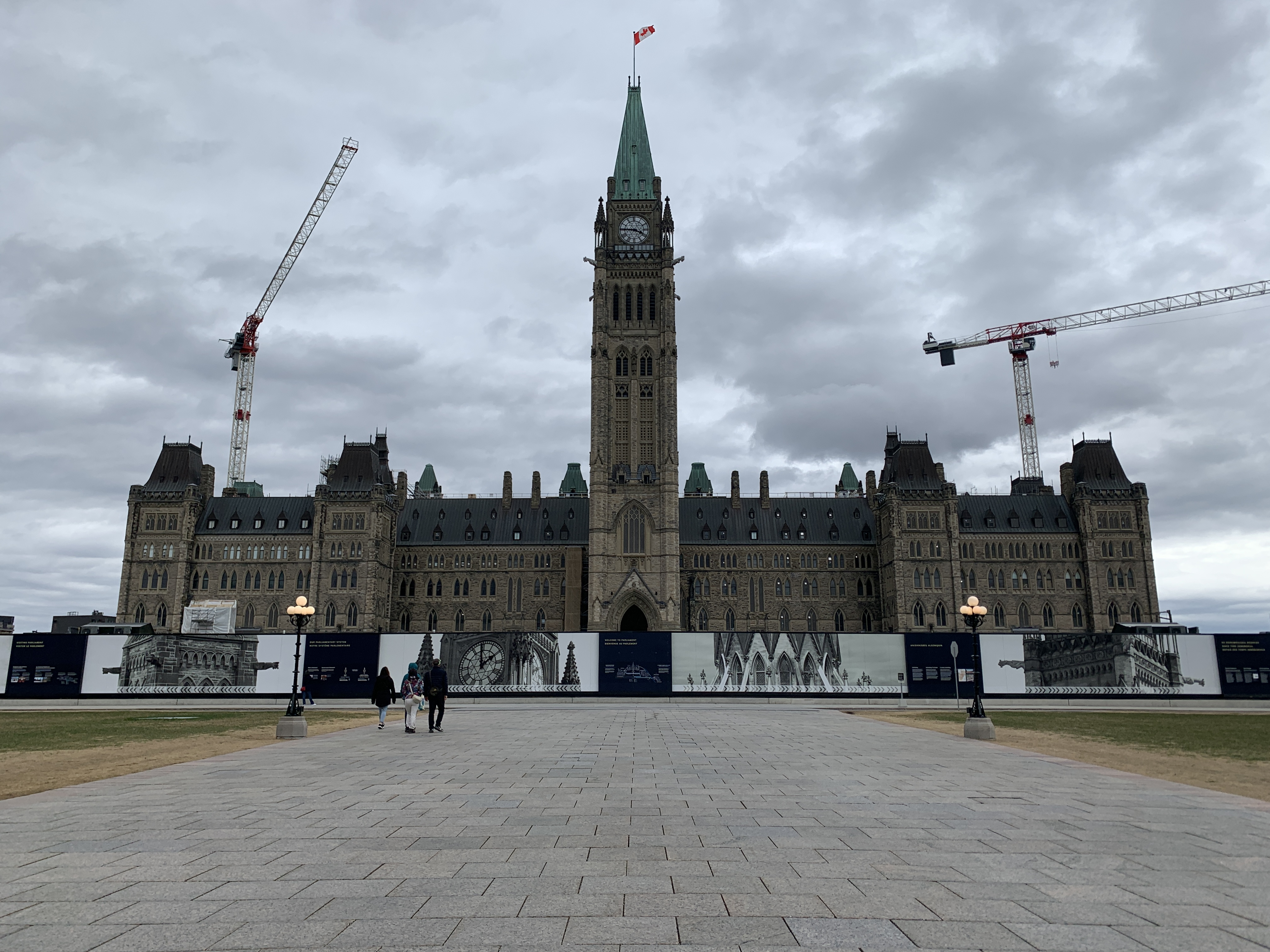
- Canadian Parliament (2022)

Parliament leaders
- Prime minister: Rt. Hon. Justin Trudeau; Nov. 4, 2015 – Mar. 14, 2025
- Rt. Hon. Mark Carney; Mar. 14, 2025 – present
- Cabinets: 29th Canadian Ministry; 30th Canadian Ministry
- Leader of the Opposition: Hon. Erin O'Toole; Aug. 24, 2020 – Feb. 2, 2022
- Hon. Candice Bergen; Feb. 2, 2022 – Sep. 10, 2022
- Hon. Pierre Poilievre; Sep. 10, 2022 – Apr. 28, 2025

Party caucuses
- Government: Liberal Party
- Opposition: Conservative Party
- Recognized: Bloc Québécois
- New Democratic Party (Note: The New Democratic Party provided confidence and supply for the Liberal Party government from March 2022 to September 2024.)
- Independent Senators Group*
- Canadian Senators Group*
- Progressive Senate Group*
- Unrecognized: Green Party
- * Only in the Senate.

House of Commons
- Seating arrangements of the House of Commons
- Speaker of the Commons: Hon. Anthony Rota; Dec. 5, 2019 – Sep. 27, 2023
- Louis Plamondon (interim); Sep. 27, 2023 – Oct. 3, 2023
- Hon. Greg Fergus; Oct. 3, 2023 – May. 26, 2025
- Government House leader: Hon. Mark Holland; Oct. 26, 2021 – Jul. 26, 2023
- Hon. Karina Gould; Jul. 26, 2023 – Jan. 8, 2024
- Hon. Steven MacKinnon (interim); Jan. 8, 2024 – Jul. 19, 2024
- Hon. Karina Gould; Jul. 19, 2024 – Jan. 24, 2025
- Hon. Steven MacKinnon; Jan. 24, 2025 – Mar. 14, 2025
- Hon. Arielle Kayabaga; Mar. 14, 2025 – May. 13, 2025
- Opposition House leader: Gérard Deltell; Sep. 2, 2020 – Feb. 4, 2022
- John Brassard; Feb. 5, 2022 – Sep. 12, 2022
- Hon. Andrew Scheer; Sep. 13, 2022 – present
- Members: 338 MP seats List of members

Senate
- Seating arrangements of the Senate
- Speaker of the Senate: Hon. George Furey; 3 Dec 2015 – 12 May 2023
- Hon. Raymonde Gagné; 12 May 2023 – present
- Government Senate rep.: Hon. Marc Gold; 24 Jan 2020 – present
- Opposition Senate leader: Hon. Don Plett; 5 Nov 2019 – present
- Senators: 105 senator seats List of senators

Sovereign
- Monarch: HM Elizabeth II; Feb. 6, 1952 – Sep. 8, 2022
- HM Charles III; Sep. 8, 2022 – present
- Governor general: HE Rt. Hon. Mary Simon; Jul. 26, 2021 – Jun. 8, 2026

Sessions
- 1st session 22 Nov 2021 – 6 Jan 2025
| ← 43rd | → 45th |

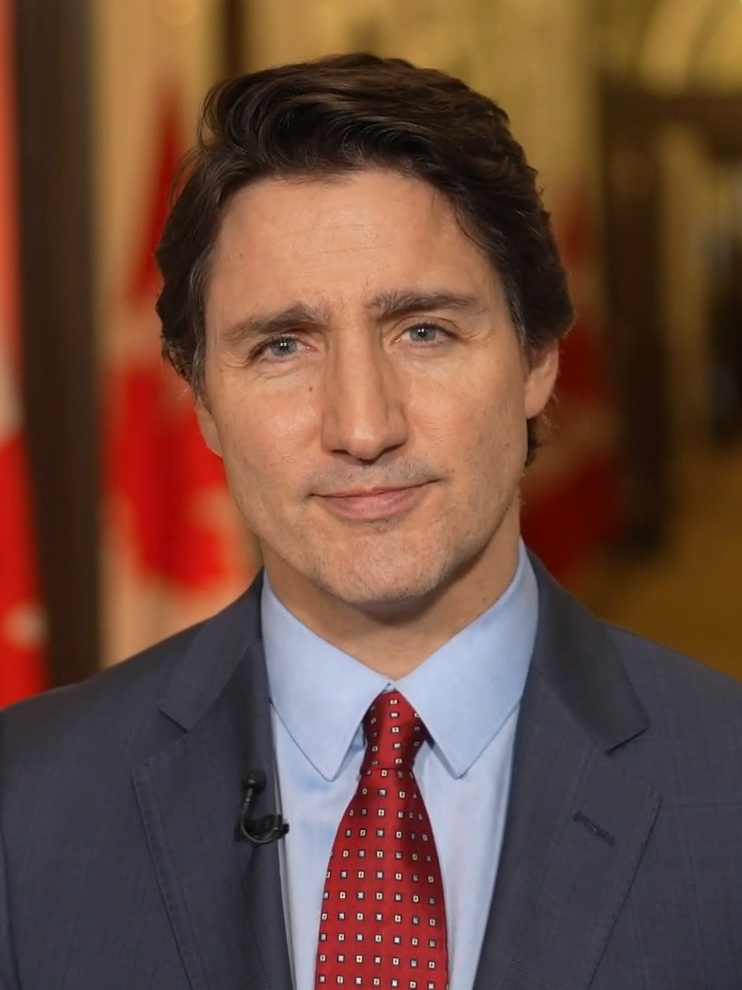
Justin Trudeau was Prime Minister during most of the 44th Canadian Parliament.

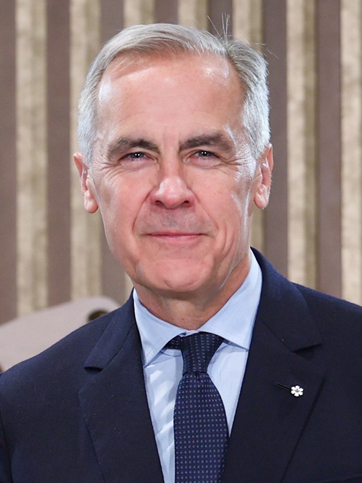
Mark Carney was Prime Minister at the end of the 44th Canadian Parliament.

The 44th Canadian Parliament was in session from 22 November 2021 to 23 March 2025, with the membership of the House of Commons having been determined by the results of the 2021 federal election held on 20 September. Parliament officially resumed on 22 November with the re-election of Speaker Anthony Rota, and the Speech from the Throne was read by Governor General Mary Simon the following day. It was dissolved before the 2025 federal election.

== Overview ==
The 44th Parliament corresponded to a Liberal Party minority government under the premiership of Justin Trudeau, with Trudeau succeeded by Mark Carney for its final nine days. Six months into the first session, on 22 March 2022, it was announced that the New Democratic Party would support the government with confidence and supply measures. The support was contingent on the government implementing a Pharmacare program and a dental care program. The temporary Canada Dental Benefit was established in December 2022, and the permanent Canadian Dental Care Plan began rolling out in December 2023. The NDP ended their confidence and supply arrangement with the Liberal government on 4 September 2024.

On 6 January 2025, amid political pressure, Trudeau announced that he would resign as leader of the Liberal Party and as prime minister once his successor was elected. He also advised the Governor General to prorogue Parliament until 24 March while his successor was determined, thus ending the first session of the 44th Parliament; he stated that "despite best efforts to work through it, Parliament has been paralyzed for months."

Mark Carney was elected as Liberal leader on 9 March and was appointed prime minister on 14 March. Carney advised the Governor General to dissolve Parliament on 23 March, triggering a general election on 28 April.

=== Sessions ===
There was one session of the 44th Parliament:

| Session | Start | End |
|---|---|---|
| 1st | November 22, 2021 | January 6, 2025 |

== Party standings ==
Standings in the 44th Canadian Parliament
| Affiliation | House members | | | Senate members | | |
| Affiliation | 2021 election results | At dissolution | +/– | On election day 2021 | At dissolution | +/– |
|---|---|---|---|---|---|---|
| Liberal | 160 | 152 | ▼8 | – | – | Steady |
| Conservative | 119 | 120 | ▲1 | 18 | 12 | ▼6 |
| Bloc Québécois | 32 | 33 | ▲1 | – | – | Steady |
| New Democratic | 25 | 24 | ▼1 | – | – | Steady |
| Green | 2 | 2 | Steady | – | – | Steady |
| Independent or non-affiliated | 0 | 3 | ▲3 | 9 | 14 | ▲5 |
| Independent Senators Group | – | – | Steady | 40 | 44 | ▲4 |
| Progressive Senate Group | – | – | Steady | 14 | 17 | ▲3 |
| Canadian Senators Group | – | – | Steady | 13 | 18 | ▲5 |
| Total members | 338 | 334 | | 94 | 105 | |
| Vacant | 0 | 4 | ▲4 | 11 | 0 | ▼11 |
| Total seats | 338 | | | 105 | | |

== Major events ==
=== 2021 ===
- 20 September – In the 44th Canadian federal election, the incumbent Liberal Party wins the most seats in the House of Commons, but fails to reach a majority government.
- 26 October – The new Ministry is sworn in, the first overseen by Governor General Mary Simon.
- 22 November – Opening of the 44th Parliament, and re-election of the Honourable Anthony Rota as Speaker of the House of Commons.
- 23 November – Governor General Mary Simon delivers the Speech from the Throne. The Library of Parliament notes this as "the first time such a speech was delivered by the Governor General in English, French and Inuktitut, with simultaneous interpretation."

=== 2022 ===
- 2 February – Erin O'Toole is removed as the leader of the Conservative Party, and consequently as the Leader of the Official Opposition, in a caucus vote.
- 21 February – The House of Commons votes to confirm the Emergencies Act, with 185 for and 151 opposing the motion. The act was invoked in relation to the convoy protests in Ottawa and at border points.
- 23 February – The equivalent Emergencies Act confirmation motion in the Senate is withdrawn without a vote by Representative of the Government in the Senate, Marc Gold, following the revocation of the Emergencies Act by the government earlier that day.
- 22 March – The Liberal Party and New Democratic Party announce a confidence and supply agreement that will see the NDP support the Liberals on confidence motions (including budgets) until 2025 in exchange for Liberal support of certain NDP policies.
- 10 September – The 2022 Conservative Party leadership election concludes. Pierre Poilievre is elected as the new Conservative leader.
- 19 November – The 2022 Green Party leadership election concludes. MP and former leader Elizabeth May is once again announced as the new leader of the Green Party of Canada, in partnership with Jonathan Pedneault, who is named as the de jure deputy leader of the Greens.

=== 2023 ===
- 31 March – Former Conservative Party leader Erin O'Toole announces that he will resign as Member of Parliament for Durham at the end of the spring season of the House of Commons and not seek re-election.
- 26 July – The Liberal government holds a major cabinet reshuffle.
- 26 September – After pressure from government cabinet ministers and Opposition parliamentary leaders, the Speaker of the House of Commons, Liberal MP Anthony Rota, announces that he will resign from that position effective 27 September 2023, after erroneously inviting to the House gallery and honouring a 98-year-old Ukrainian war veteran, Yaroslav Hunka, who was found to have served in the armed forces of Nazi Germany during World War II. Rota's invitation of Hunka took place during a state visit and parliamentary address by Ukrainian President Volodymyr Zelenskyy.
- 27 September – The members of the House of Commons unanimously nominate the Dean of the House, Bloc Québécois MP Louis Plamondon, as their interim Speaker to temporarily succeed Anthony Rota after his resignation, until a permanent successor is chosen by a ballot of MPs in the following week.
- 3 October – Liberal MP Greg Fergus is elected speaker of the House of Commons. He is the first person of colour to be elected speaker.

=== 2024 ===
- 16 January – Liberal MP Carolyn Bennett for Toronto—St. Paul's resigns her seat.
- 1 February – Liberal MP David Lametti for LaSalle—Émard—Verdun resigns his seat.
- 31 March – NDP MP Daniel Blaikie for Elmwood—Transcona resigns his seat.
- 30 April Opposition leader Pierre Poilievre was ejected from the House of Commons after referring to Trudeau as a "wacko prime minister", when criticizing Trudeau's past support for British Columbia's decriminalization of hard drug use in public spaces. After Poilievre refused to withdraw the adjective, House Speaker Greg Fergus removed Poilievre from the chamber on the grounds that he used unparliamentary language.
- 27 May – Liberal MP John Aldag for Cloverdale—Langley City resigns his seat.
- 28 May - The House of Commons votes 168 to 142 against a motion to remove Greg Fregus as speaker. The Liberals, Greens, and New Democrats voted against removing him, while the Bloc Québécois and Conservatives voted in favour of removing him.
- 24 June – Conservative MP Don Stewart is elected as the new member for Toronto—St. Paul's following a by-election, in a pickup of the seat from the Liberals.
- 31 August – Liberal MP Andy Fillmore for Halifax resigns his seat.
- 4 September – The New Democratic Party ends their confidence and supply agreement with the Liberals.
- 16 September – NDP MP Leila Dance is elected as the new member for Elmwood—Transcona, retaining the seat for her party, and Bloc Québécois MP Louis-Philippe Sauvé wins the riding of LaSalle—Émard—Verdun, in a pickup from the Liberals.
- 19 September – Liberal MP Pablo Rodriguez of Honoré-Mercier resigns his membership in the Liberal caucus and federal cabinet to sit as an independent MP while he runs for the leadership of the Quebec Liberal Party.
- 20 November – Minister of Employment, Workforce Development, and Official Languages Randy Boissonnault resigns from Cabinet due to allegations of falsely claiming he was of Cree ancestry. He remains the MP for Edmonton Centre.
- 9 December – Prime Minister Justin Trudeau's Liberal Government survives a third motion of no confidence, with the Conservatives and Bloc Québécois voting for the motion, and the Liberals, NDP, and Greens opposed.
- 16 December –
  - Minister of Housing, Infrastructure, and Communities Sean Fraser vows to not seek re-election and ends his role as minister in the next Cabinet shuffle.
  - Deputy Prime Minister and Finance Minister Chrystia Freeland resigns from the federal Cabinet but remains an MP.
  - Conservative MP Tamara Jansen is elected as the new member for Cloverdale—Langley City in a by-election, resulting in a pickup from the Liberal Party, retaking the riding and seat after her earlier defeat in the 2021 federal election.

=== 2025 ===
- 6 January – Trudeau announces the prorogation of parliament in addition his resignation as Prime Minister and as leader of the Liberal Party, effective upon the election of his successor as party leader in the 2025 Liberal Party of Canada leadership election.
- 20 January – Independent MP Pablo Rodriguez for Honoré-Mercier resigns his seat.
- 30 January – NDP MP Randall Garrison for Esquimalt—Saanich—Sooke resigns his seat.
- 9 March – Mark Carney wins the Liberal Party of Canada's leadership election and becomes the prime minister-designate, pending his swearing-in by Governor General of Canada Mary Simon.
- 14 March –
  - Trudeau resigns as prime minister, and is succeeded by Carney, who is sworn in by the governor general, along with his ministry.
  - Liberal MP Marco Mendicino for Eglinton—Lawrence resigns his seat.
- 23 March – Governor General Mary Simon dissolves parliament and sets April 28 as the date of the federal election, upon Prime Minister Carney's request.

== Legislation and motions ==
With the Liberal Party and NDP entering into a confidence and supply agreement on budgetary items and motions of confidence, the final component of the 2021 budget (Bill C-8) was adopted in June 2022. Among other provisions, Bill C-8 enacted the Underused Housing Tax Act, created a new tax credit to return carbon tax paid by farmers, created the COVID-19 Air Quality Improvement Tax Credit, and expanded both the School Supplies Tax Credit and the northern residents deduction amount. Similarly, the 2022 budget was implemented in Bills C-19 and C-32. Among other provisions, Bill C-19 doubled the Home Accessibility Tax Credit, created the Labour Mobility Deduction for tradespeople, made vaping products subject to excise duties, removed excise duties from low-alcohol beer, removed the excise duty exemption that had applied to Canadian wine as directed by the WTO, and amended the Copyright Act as agreed to in the Canada-United States–Mexico Agreement, and criminalized Holocaust denial. Bill C-19 also enacted the Civil Lunar Gateway Agreement Implementation Act; the Prohibition on the Purchase of Residential Property by Non-Canadians Act; and the Select Luxury Items Tax Act to create a new sales tax applicable to luxury cars, planes and boats; and also repealed the Safe Drinking Water for First Nations Act. Bill C-32 created the First Home Savings Account as a new registered savings plan and the Multigenerational Home Renovation Tax Credit; made income derived from house-flipping into business income for taxation purposes; created a temporary 15% tax on the taxable income of banks that exceeded $1 billion; and, in response to the Russian invasion of Ukraine, increased maximum financial assistance that can be provided to foreign states from US$5 billion to C$14 billion. In other legislation, Bill C-11 adopted the Online Streaming Act and Bill C-18 adopted the Online News Act.

On healthcare, the Canada Dental Benefit was created with Bill C-31 with the Liberals, NDP and Green Party in support, and Conservatives and Bloc opposed. With all party support, Bill C-10 directed $2.5 billion be paid for COVID testing purposes; Bill C-12 amended guaranteed income supplements to exclude payments received from the Emergency Response Benefit, the Recovery Benefit and the Worker Lockdown Benefit. With both the NDP and Conservatives opposing, Bill C-2 enacted the Canada Worker Lockdown Benefit Act and extended various other COVID-related benefit programs. On public safety and crime, with all party support, Bill C-3 inserted a new offence into the Criminal Code regarding intimidation of a person seeking health services and obstruction of lawful access to a place at which health services are provided. Bill C-28 was adopted in response to R v Brown (2022) addressing self-induced extreme intoxication.

== Committees ==
=== House Committees ===
| Committee | Chair | Vice Chairs | |
|---|---|---|---|
| Veterans Affairs | Emmanuel Dubourg (LPC) | Blake Richards (CPC) | Luc Desilets (BQ) |
| Agriculture and Agri-Food | Kody Blois (LPC) | John Barlow (CPC) | Yves Perron (BQ) |
| Canadian Heritage | Hon. Hedy Fry (LPC) | Kevin Waugh (CPC) | Martin Champoux (BQ) |
| International Trade | Hon. Judy A. Sgro (LPC) | Ryan Williams (CPC) | Simon-Pierre Savard-Tremblay (BQ) |
| Citizenship and Immigration | Sukh Dhaliwal (LPC) | Brad Redekopp (CPC) | Alexis Brunelle-Duceppe (BQ) |
| Environment and Sustainable Development | Francis Scarpaleggia (LPC) | Dan Mazier (CPC) | Monique Pauze (BQ) |
| Access to Information, Privacy, and Ethics | John Brassard (CPC) | Darren Fisher (LPC) | Rene Villemure (BQ) |
| Status of Women | Shelby Kramp-Neuman (CPC) | Sonia Sidhu (LPC) | Andreanne Larouche (BQ) |
| Finance | Peter Fonseca (LPC) | Jasraj Singh Hallen (CPC) | Gabriel Ste-Marie (BQ) |
| Fisheries and Oceans | Ken McDonald (LPC) | Mel Arnold (CPC) | Caroline Desbiens (BQ) |
| Health | Sean Casey (LPC) | Stephen Ellis (CPC) | Luc Theriault (BQ) |
| Human Resources, Skills and Social Development and the Status of Persons with Disabilities | Robert Morissey (LPC) | Tracy Gray (CPC) | Louise Chabot (BQ) |
| Indigenous and Northern Affairs | Patrick Weiler (LPC) | Jamie Schmale (CPC) | Sebastian Lemire (BQ) |
| Industry and Technology | Joel Lightbound (LPC) | Rick Perkins (CPC) | Jean-Denis Garon (BQ) |
| Justice and Human Rights | Lena Metlege Diab (LPC) | Larry Brock (CPC) | Rheal Eloi Fortin (BQ) |
| Official Languages | Rene Arseneault (LPC) | Joel Godin (CPC) | Mario Beaulieu (BQ) |
| National Defence | Hon. John McKay (LPC) | James Bezan (CPC) | Christine Normandin (BQ) |
| Government Operations and Estimates | Kelly McCauley (CPC) | Majid Jowhari (LPC) | Julie Vignola (BQ) |
| Public Accounts | John Williamson (CPC) | Jean Yip (LPC) | Nathalie Sinclair Desgagne (BQ) |
| Procedure and House Affairs | Ben Carr (LPC) | Michael Cooper (CPC) | Marie Helene Gaudreau (BQ) |
| Natural Resources | George Chahal (LPC) | Shannon Stubbs (CPC) | Mario Simard (BQ) |
| Public Safety and National Security | Iqwinder Gaheer (LPC) | Raquel Dancho (CPC) | Kristina Michaud (BQ) |
| Science and Research | Valerie Bradford (LPC) | Corey Tochor (CPC) | Maxime Blanchette-Joncas (BQ) |
| Transport, Infrastructure, and Communities | Peter Schiefke (LPC) | Philip Lawrence (CPC) | Xavier Barsalou-Duval (BQ) |

=== Joint Committees ===
| Committee | Joint Chairs | Vice Chair (s) |
|---|---|---|
| Medical Assistance in Dying | N/A | N/A |
| Library of Parliament | Hon. Mohamed-Iqbal Ravalia MP Angelo Lacono (LPC) | MP Louis Plamondon (BQ) |
| Declaration of Emergency | Hon. Gwen Boniface MP Rhéal Éloi Fortin (BQ) MP Matthew Green (NDP) | Hon. Claude Carignan Rachel Bendayan (LPC) Glen Motz (CPC) |
| Scrutiny of Regulations | Hon. Yuen Pau Woo MP Dan Albas (CPC) | Tim Louis (LPC) Denis Trudel (BQ) |

=== Senate ===
| Committee | Chair (s) | Deputy Chair (s) |
|---|---|---|
| Foreign Affairs and International Relations | Peter M. Boehm (ISG) | Peter Harder (PSG) |
| Agriculture and Forestry | Robert Black (CSG) | Paula Simons (ISG) |
| Audit and Oversight | Marty Klyne (PSG) Donna Dasko (ISG) | David M. Wells (CPC) Colin Deacon (CSG) |
| Indigenous Peoples | Brian Francis (PSG) | David M. Arnot (ISG) |
| Banking, Commerce, and the Economy | Pamela Wallin (CSG) | Tony Loffreda (ISG) |
| Internal Economy, Budgets, and Administration | Lucie Moncion (ISG) | Claude Carignan (CPC) |
| Ethics and Conflict of interest for Senators | Judith Seidman (CPC) | Brent Cotter (ISG) |
| Energy, the Environment, and Natural Resources | Paul Massicotte (ISG) | Josee Verner (CSG) |
| Legal and Constitutional Affairs | Brent Cotter (ISG) | Denise Batters (CPC) |
| National Finance | Claude Carignan (CPC) | Eric Forest (ISG) |
| Official Languages | Rene Cormier (ISG) | Rose-May Poirier (CPC) |
| Fisheries and Oceans | Fabian Manning (CPC) | Bev Busson (ISG) |
| Human Rights | Salma Ataullahjan (CPC) | Wanda Thomas Bernard (PSG) |
| Rules, Procedures, and Rights of Parliament | Michèle Audette (PSG) | Denise Batters (CPC) Stan Kutcher (ISG) |
| National Security, Defence and Veterans Affairs | Hassan Yussuff (ISG) | Jean-Guy Dagenais (CSG) |
| Selection | Michael L. MacDonald (CPC) | Chantal Petitclerc (ISG) |
| Social Affairs, Science and Technology | Rosemary Moodie (ISG) | Wanda Thomas Bernard (PSG) |

== Ministry ==
The 29th Canadian Ministry was formed during the 42nd Canadian Parliament and lasted until near the end of the 44th Canadian Parliament. The 30th Canadian Ministry began near the end of the 42nd Canadian Parliament.

== Officeholders ==
=== Head of State ===
| Office | Photo | Name | Assumed office | Left office |
|---|---|---|---|---|
| Sovereign | | Elizabeth II | February 6, 1952 | September 8, 2022 |
| Sovereign | | Charles III | September 8, 2022 | Incumbent |
| Governor General | | Mary Simon | July 26, 2021 | June 8, 2026 |

=== Party leadership ===
| Office | Photo | Name | Assumed office | Left office |
|---|---|---|---|---|
| Liberal | | Justin Trudeau | April 14, 2013 | March 9, 2025 |
| Liberal | | Mark Carney | March 9, 2025 | Incumbent |
| Conservative | | Erin O'Toole | August 24, 2020 | February 2, 2022 |
| Conservative | | Candice Bergen | February 2, 2022 | September 10, 2022 |
| Conservative | | Pierre Poilievre | September 10, 2022 | Incumbent |
| Bloc Québécois | | Yves-François Blanchet | 17 January 2019 | Incumbent |
| New Democratic | | Jagmeet Singh | October 1, 2017 | May 5, 2025 |

=== House of Commons ===
==== Presiding officer ====
| Office | Photo | Party | Officer | Riding | Assumed office | Left office |
|---|---|---|---|---|---|---|
| Speaker of the House of Commons | | Liberal | Anthony Rota | Nipissing—Timiskaming | December 5, 2019 | September 27, 2023 |
| Speaker of the House of Commons | | Bloc Québécois | Louis Plamondon (acting) | Bécancour—Nicolet—Saurel | September 27, 2023 | October 3, 2023 |
| Speaker of the House of Commons | | Liberal | Greg Fergus | Hull—Aylmer | October 3, 2023 | May 26, 2025 |

==== Government leadership (Liberal) ====
| Office | Photo | Officer | Riding | Assumed office | Left office |
|---|---|---|---|---|---|
| Prime Minister | | Justin Trudeau | Papineau | November 4, 2015 | March 14, 2025 |
| Prime Minister | Mark Carney | Mark Carney | | March 14, 2025 | |
| House Leader | | Mark Holland | Ajax | October 26, 2021 | July 26, 2023 |
| House Leader | | Karina Gould (Note: on parental leave January 8—late July 2024) (1st time) | Burlington | July 26, 2023 | January 8, 2024 |
| House Leader | | Steven MacKinnon (interim) (1st time) | Gatineau | January 8, 2024 | July 19, 2024 |
| House Leader | | Karina Gould (2nd time) | Burlington | July 19, 2024 | January 24, 2025 |
| House Leader | | Steven MacKinnon (2nd time) | Gatineau | January 24, 2025 | March 14, 2025 |
| House Leader | | Arielle Kayabaga | London West | March 14, 2025 | May 13, 2025 |
| Whip | | Steven MacKinnon | Gatineau | October 28, 2021 | January 8, 2024 |
| Whip | | Steven MacKinnon | Brampton North | January 8, 2024 | December 21, 2024 |
| Whip | | Mona Fortier | Ottawa—Vanier | December 21, 2024 | March 14, 2025 |
| Whip | | Rechie Valdez | Mississauga—Streetsville | March 14, 2025 | May 14, 2025 |
| Caucus Chair | | Brenda Shanahan | Châteauguay—Lacolle | November 28, 2021 | May 13, 2025 |

==== Opposition leadership (Conservative) ====
| Office | Photo | Officer | Riding | Assumed office | Left office |
|---|---|---|---|---|---|
| Leader of the Opposition | Pierre Poilievre | Erin O'Toole | Durham | August 24, 2020 | February 2, 2022 |
| Leader of the Opposition | | Candice Bergen (interim) | Portage—Lisgar | February 2, 2022 | September 10, 2022 |
| Leader of the Opposition | Pierre Poilievre | Pierre Poilievre | Carleton | September 10, 2022 | |
| Deputy Leaders | | Candice Bergen | Portage—Lisgar | September 2, 2020 | February 2, 2022 |
| Deputy Leaders | | Luc Berthold | Mégantic—L'Érable | February 2, 2022 | September 10, 2022 |
| Deputy Leaders | | Melissa Lantsman | Thornhill | 10 September 2022 | |
| Deputy Leaders | Tim Uppal | Tim Uppal | Edmonton Mill Woods | 10 September 2022 | |
| House Leader | | Gérard Deltell | Louis-Saint-Laurent | September 2, 2020 | February 5, 2022 |
| House Leader | | John Brassard | Barrie—Innisfil | February 5, 2022 | September 13, 2022 |
| House Leader | Andrew Scheer | Andrew Scheer | Regina—Qu'Appelle | September 13, 2022 | |
| Deputy House Leader | Luc Berthold | Luc Berthold | Mégantic—L'Érable | 13 September 2022 | |
| Whip | Kerry-Lynne Findlay | Kerry-Lynne Findlay | South Surrey—White Rock | 13 September 2022 | |
| Deputy Whip and QP Coordinator | Chris Warkentin | Chris Warkentin | Grande Prairie-Mackenzie | 13 September 2022 | |
| Caucus Chair | Scott Reid | Scott Reid | Lanark—Frontenac—Kingston | 13 September 2022 | |
| Caucus Party Liaison | Eric Duncan | Eric Duncan | Stormont—Dundas—South Glengarry | 13 September 2022 | |
| Caucus Committee Coordinator | Jake Stewart | Jake Stewart | Miramichi—Grand Lake | 13 September 2022 | |
| Quebec Lieutenant | Pierre Paul-Hus | Pierre Paul-Hus | Charlesbourg-Haute-Saint-Charles | 13 September 2022 | |

=== Senate ===
==== Presiding officer ====
| Office | Photo | Party | Officer | Province | Since |
|---|---|---|---|---|---|
| Speaker of the Senate | | Non-affiliated | Raymonde Gagné | Manitoba | 12 May 2023 |

==== Government leadership (non-affiliated) ====
| Office | Officer | Province | Since |
|---|---|---|---|
| Government Representative in the Senate | Marc Gold | Quebec | 24 January 2020 |
| Legislative Deputy to the Government Representative in the Senate | Patti LaBoucane-Benson | Alberta | N/A |
| Government Liaison in the Senate | Michèle Audette | Quebec | 9 August 2023 |

==== Opposition leadership (Conservative) ====
| Office | Photo | Officer | Province | Since |
|---|---|---|---|---|
| Leader of the Opposition | | Don Plett | Manitoba | 5 November 2019 |
| Deputy leader of the Opposition | | Yonah Martin | British Columbia | November 2015 |
| Whip of the Opposition | | Judith Seidman | Quebec | N/A |
| Deputy Whip of the Opposition | | Leo Housakos | Quebec | N/A |
| Chair of the Conservative Caucus | | Rose-May Poirier | New Brunswick | December 2019 |

== Changes to party standings ==
=== By-elections ===
Changes in seats held (2021–2025)
| Seat | Before | | | Change | | | |
| Seat | Date | Member | Party | Reason | Date | Member | Party |
|---|---|---|---|---|---|---|---|
| Spadina—Fort York | 22 November 2021 | Kevin Vuong | █ Liberal | Excluded from caucus | | | █ Independent |
| Mississauga—Lakeshore | 27 May 2022 | Sven Spengemann | █ Liberal | Resigned to accept a position with the United Nations | 12 December 2022 | Charles Sousa | █ Liberal |
| Richmond—Arthabaska | 13 September 2022 | Alain Rayes | █ Conservative | Left caucus | | | █ Independent |
| Winnipeg South Centre | 12 December 2022 | Jim Carr | █ Liberal | Died in office | 19 June 2023 | Ben Carr | █ Liberal |
| Calgary Heritage | 31 December 2022 | Bob Benzen | █ Conservative | Resigned to return to the private sector | 24 July 2023 | Shuvaloy Majumdar | █ Conservative |
| Oxford | 28 January 2023 | Dave MacKenzie | █ Conservative | Retired | 19 June 2023 | Arpan Khanna | █ Conservative |
| Portage—Lisgar | 28 February 2023 | Candice Bergen | █ Conservative | Resigned | 19 June 2023 | Branden Leslie | █ Conservative |
| Notre-Dame-de-Grâce—Westmount | 8 March 2023 | Marc Garneau | █ Liberal | Retired | 19 June 2023 | Anna Gainey | █ Liberal |
| Don Valley North | 22 March 2023 | Han Dong | █ Liberal | Left caucus | | | █ Independent |
| Durham | 1 August 2023 | Erin O'Toole | █ Conservative | Resigned | 4 March 2024 | Jamil Jivani | █ Conservative |
| Toronto—St. Paul's | 16 January 2024 | Carolyn Bennett | █ Liberal | Resigned to become ambassador of Canada to Denmark | 24 June 2024 | Don Stewart | █ Conservative |
| LaSalle—Émard—Verdun | 1 February 2024 | David Lametti | █ Liberal | Resigned to join law firm | 16 September 2024 | Louis-Philippe Sauvé | █ Bloc Québécois |
| Elmwood—Transcona | 31 March 2024 | Daniel Blaikie | █ New Democratic | Resigned to work with Premier of Manitoba Wab Kinew | 16 September 2024 | Leila Dance | █ New Democratic |
| Cloverdale—Langley City | 27 May 2024 | John Aldag | █ Liberal | Resigned to run as the BC NDP candidate for Langley-Abbotsford in the 2024 British Columbia general election | 16 December 2024 | Tamara Jansen | █ Conservative |
| Halifax | 31 August 2024 | Andy Fillmore | █ Liberal | Resigned to run for the mayoralty of Halifax, Nova Scotia, in the 2024 Halifax municipal election | 14 April 2025 (cancelled) | | █ Vacant |
| Honoré-Mercier | 19 September 2024 | Pablo Rodriguez | █ Liberal | Left caucus | | | █ Independent |
| Honoré-Mercier | 20 January 2025 | Pablo Rodriguez | █ Independent | Resigned to run for the leadership of the Quebec Liberal Party, in the 2025 Quebec Liberal Party leadership election | Vacant seat until the 2025 federal election | | █ Vacant |
| Esquimalt—Saanich—Sooke | 30 January 2025 | Randall Garrison | █ New Democratic | Resigned | Vacant seat until the 2025 federal election | | █ Vacant |
| Eglinton—Lawrence | 14 March 2025 | Marco Mendicino | █ Liberal | Resigned to become Chief of Staff to the Prime Minister | Vacant seat until the 2025 federal election | | █ Vacant |

=== Membership changes ===
==== House of Commons ====
| Number of members per party by date | 2021 | 2022 | | | | 2023 | | | | | | | 2024 | | | | | | | | | | | 2025 | | |
| Number of members per party by date | Sep 20 | Mar 22 | May 27 | Sep 13 | Dec 31 | Jan 28 | Feb 28 | Mar 8 | Mar 22 | Jun 19 | Jul 24 | Aug 1 | Jan 16 | Feb 1 | Mar 4 | Mar 31 | May 27 | Jun 24 | Aug 31 | Sep 4 | Sep 16 | Sep 19 | Dec 16 | Jan 20 | Jan 30 | Mar 14 |
|---|---|---|---|---|---|---|---|---|---|---|---|---|---|---|---|---|---|---|---|---|---|---|---|---|---|---|
| Liberal | 159 | | 158 (Note: The Liberals briefly fell to 157 seats on December 12, 2022, during the period between Jim Carr's death and Charles Sousa's by-election victory in Mississauga—Lakeshore. During this period the government majority shrunk to -22, and the number of vacant seats rose to 2.) | | | | | 157 | 156 | 158 | | | 157 | 156 | | | 155 | | 154 | | | 153 | | | | 152 |
| Conservative | 119 | | | 118 | 117 | 116 | 115 | | | 117 | 118 | 117 | | | 118 | | | 119 | | | | | 120 | | | |
| Bloc Québécois | 32 | | | | | | | | | | | | | | | | | | | | 33 | | | | | |
| New Democratic | 25 | | | | | | | | | | | | | | | 24 | | | | | 25 | | | | 24 | |
| Green | 2 | | | | | | | | | | | | | | | | | | | | | | | | | |
| Independent | 1 | | | 2 | | | | | 3 | | | | | | | | | | | | | 4 | | 3 | | |
| Total members | 338 | | 337 | | 336 | 335 | 334 | 333 | | 337 | 338 | 337 | 336 | 335 | 336 | 335 | 334 | 335 | 334 | | 336 | | 337 | 336 | 335 | 334 |
| Government majority | -20 | | | -21 | | -19 | -18 | -19 | -21 | | -22 | -21 | -22 | -23 | -24 | -25 | -26 | -27 | -28 | | -30 | -31 | -32 | -31 | -30 | -31 |
| Government majority with C & S measures (Note: The Liberal and New Democratic (NDP) parties reach a confidence and supply agreement on 22 March 2022.) (Note: The New Democratic Party rescinds its confidence and supply agreement with the Liberal Party on September 4, 2024.) | N/A | 30 | | 29 | | 31 | 32 | 31 | 29 | | 28 | 29 | 28 | 27 | 26 | 25 | 24 | 23 | 22 | | 23 | 22 | N/A | | | |
| Vacant | 0 | | 1 | | 2 | 3 | 4 | 5 | | 1 | 0 | 1 | 2 | 3 | 2 | 3 | 4 | 3 | 4 | | 2 | | 1 | 2 | 3 | 4 |

==== Senate ====
| Date | ISG | CSG | PSG | CPC | NA | Vac | Tot |
|---|---|---|---|---|---|---|---|
| 2021-09-20 | 40 | 13 | 14 | 18 | 9 | 11 | 94 |
| 2021-09-27 | 41 | 13 | 14 | 18 | 8 | 11 | 94 |
| 2021-10-06 | 42 | 13 | 14 | 18 | 7 | 11 | 94 |
| 2021-10-07 | 43 | 13 | 14 | 18 | 6 | 11 | 94 |
| 2021-10-08 | 44 | 13 | 14 | 18 | 5 | 11 | 94 |
| 2021-10-18 | 43 | 13 | 14 | 18 | 6 | 11 | 94 |
| 2021-11-01 | 43 | 12 | 14 | 18 | 6 | 12 | 93 |
| 2021-11-21 | 42 | 12 | 14 | 18 | 6 | 13 | 92 |
| 2022-01-04 | 42 | 12 | 14 | 17 | 6 | 14 | 91 |
| 2022-02-04 | 42 | 13 | 14 | 16 | 6 | 14 | 91 |
| 2022-03-14 | 41 | 13 | 14 | 16 | 7 | 14 | 91 |
| 2022-03-18 | 41 | 12 | 14 | 16 | 7 | 15 | 90 |
| 2022-05-07 | 41 | 12 | 13 | 16 | 7 | 16 | 89 |
| 2022-06-04 | 40 | 12 | 13 | 16 | 7 | 17 | 88 |
| 2022-06-27 | 39 | 12 | 14 | 16 | 7 | 17 | 88 |
| 2022-08-04 | 39 | 13 | 14 | 15 | 7 | 17 | 88 |
| 2022-09-27 | 39 | 13 | 14 | 15 | 9 | 15 | 90 |
| 2022-10-03 | 39 | 12 | 14 | 15 | 9 | 16 | 89 |
| 2022-10-24 | 39 | 11 | 14 | 15 | 10 | 16 | 89 |
| 2022-11-10 | 39 | 11 | 14 | 15 | 11 | 15 | 90 |
| 2022-11-21 | 39 | 11 | 14 | 15 | 14 | 12 | 93 |
| 2023-01-10 | 39 | 12 | 14 | 15 | 13 | 12 | 93 |
| 2023-01-12 | 39 | 13 | 14 | 15 | 12 | 12 | 93 |
| 2023-01-24 | 40 | 13 | 14 | 15 | 11 | 12 | 93 |
| 2023-02-01 | 39 | 13 | 13 | 15 | 11 | 14 | 91 |
| 2023-02-09 | 39 | 13 | 12 | 15 | 11 | 15 | 90 |
| 2023-02-21 | 39 | 14 | 12 | 15 | 10 | 15 | 90 |
| 2023-02-23 | 39 | 14 | 13 | 15 | 9 | 15 | 90 |
| 2023-03-01 | 39 | 14 | 13 | 15 | 8 | 16 | 89 |
| 2023-05-03 | 39 | 14 | 13 | 15 | 10 | 14 | 91 |
| 2023-05-12 | 39 | 14 | 13 | 15 | 9 | 15 | 90 |
| 2023-05-15 | 39 | 14 | 12 | 15 | 9 | 16 | 89 |
| 2023-07-07 | 39 | 14 | 12 | 15 | 11 | 14 | 91 |
| 2023-07-11 | 38 | 15 | 12 | 15 | 11 | 14 | 91 |
| 2023-08-09 | 38 | 15 | 11 | 15 | 12 | 14 | 91 |
| 2023-09-08 | 37 | 15 | 11 | 15 | 12 | 15 | 90 |
| 2023-09-15 | 38 | 15 | 11 | 15 | 11 | 15 | 90 |
| 2023-09-19 | 39 | 15 | 11 | 15 | 10 | 15 | 90 |
| 2023-10-25 | 39 | 15 | 11 | 15 | 9 | 16 | 89 |
| 2023-10-31 | 39 | 15 | 11 | 15 | 14 | 11 | 94 |
| 2023-11-08 | 39 | 16 | 11 | 15 | 13 | 11 | 94 |
| 2023-11-22 | 39 | 16 | 12 | 15 | 12 | 11 | 94 |
| 2023-12-14 | 40 | 16 | 12 | 15 | 11 | 11 | 94 |
| 2023-12-15 | 40 | 16 | 13 | 15 | 10 | 11 | 94 |
| 2023-12-20 | 40 | 16 | 13 | 15 | 13 | 8 | 97 |
| 2023-12-27 | 40 | 16 | 14 | 15 | 12 | 8 | 97 |
| 2023-12-30 | 40 | 15 | 14 | 15 | 12 | 9 | 96 |
| 2024-01-10 | 40 | 16 | 14 | 15 | 11 | 9 | 96 |
| 2024-01-15 | 41 | 16 | 14 | 15 | 10 | 9 | 96 |
| 2024-01-17 | 40 | 16 | 14 | 15 | 10 | 10 | 95 |
| 2024-01-22 | 40 | 16 | 14 | 15 | 11 | 9 | 96 |
| 2024-01-28 | 40 | 16 | 14 | 15 | 12 | 8 | 97 |
| 2024-01-30 | 40 | 17 | 14 | 15 | 11 | 8 | 97 |
| 2024-02-06 | 39 | 17 | 14 | 15 | 12 | 8 | 97 |
| 2024-02-12 | 39 | 17 | 14 | 14 | 12 | 9 | 96 |
| 2024-02-13 | 39 | 17 | 14 | 14 | 13 | 8 | 97 |
| 2024-04-10 | 40 | 17 | 14 | 14 | 12 | 8 | 97 |
| 2024-04-14 | 40 | 17 | 14 | 13 | 12 | 9 | 96 |
| 2024-04-18 | 41 | 17 | 14 | 13 | 11 | 9 | 96 |
| 2024-05-02 | 42 | 17 | 14 | 13 | 10 | 9 | 96 |
| 2024-05-21 | 42 | 16 | 14 | 13 | 11 | 9 | 96 |
| 2024-05-28 | 43 | 16 | 14 | 13 | 10 | 9 | 96 |
| 2024-06-03 | 43 | 17 | 14 | 13 | 9 | 9 | 96 |
| 2024-06-04 | 43 | 18 | 14 | 13 | 8 | 9 | 96 |
| 2024-06-10 | 43 | 18 | 14 | 12 | 8 | 10 | 95 |
| 2024-06-28 | 43 | 18 | 14 | 12 | 9 | 9 | 96 |
| 2024-08-16 | 43 | 18 | 14 | 12 | 11 | 7 | 98 |
| 2024-08-20 | 42 | 18 | 14 | 12 | 11 | 8 | 97 |
| 2024-08-31 | 42 | 18 | 14 | 12 | 13 | 6 | 99 |
| 2024-09-05 | 41 | 18 | 14 | 12 | 14 | 6 | 99 |
| 2024-09-10 | 41 | 18 | 14 | 12 | 15 | 5 | 100 |
| 2024-09-25 | 41 | 18 | 14 | 12 | 16 | 4 | 101 |
| 2024-10-13 | 41 | 18 | 13 | 12 | 16 | 5 | 100 |
| 2024-10-16 | 42 | 18 | 13 | 12 | 15 | 5 | 100 |
| 2024-10-21 | 41 | 18 | 13 | 12 | 15 | 6 | 99 |
| 2024-10-22 | 41 | 18 | 14 | 12 | 14 | 6 | 99 |
| 2024-10-25 | 42 | 19 | 13 | 12 | 13 | 6 | 99 |
| 2024-11-05 | 41 | 19 | 13 | 12 | 13 | 7 | 98 |
| 2024-11-19 | 41 | 19 | 12 | 12 | 13 | 8 | 97 |
| 2024-11-20 | 41 | 19 | 13 | 12 | 12 | 8 | 97 |
| 2024-11-21 | 41 | 19 | 14 | 12 | 11 | 8 | 97 |
| 2024-11-27 | 42 | 19 | 14 | 12 | 10 | 8 | 97 |
| 2024-12-09 | 42 | 18 | 14 | 12 | 10 | 9 | 96 |
| 2024-12-18 | 41 | 18 | 14 | 12 | 10 | 10 | 95 |
| 2024-12-19 | 41 | 18 | 14 | 12 | 12 | 8 | 97 |
| 2025-02-01 | 40 | 18 | 14 | 12 | 12 | 9 | 96 |
| 2025-02-02 | 40 | 17 | 14 | 12 | 12 | 10 | 95 |
| 2025-02-07 | 40 | 17 | 14 | 12 | 15 | 7 | 98 |
| 2025-02-12 | 41 | 17 | 14 | 12 | 14 | 7 | 98 |
| 2025-02-14 | 41 | 17 | 14 | 12 | 15 | 6 | 99 |
| 2025-02-28 | 41 | 18 | 14 | 12 | 15 | 5 | 100 |
| 2025-03-04 | 41 | 18 | 15 | 12 | 14 | 5 | 100 |
| 2025-03-07 | 41 | 18 | 15 | 12 | 19 | 0 | 105 |
| 2025-03-25 | 42 | 18 | 15 | 12 | 18 | 0 | 105 |
| 2025-04-04 | 42 | 18 | 16 | 12 | 17 | 0 | 105 |
| 2025-04-08 | 42 | 18 | 17 | 12 | 16 | 0 | 105 |
| 2025-04-09 | 43 | 18 | 17 | 12 | 15 | 0 | 105 |
| 2025-04-10 | 44 | 18 | 17 | 12 | 14 | 0 | 105 |

| Date | Name | Province or territory (Senate division) | Affiliation before | Affiliation after | Reason |
|---|---|---|---|---|---|
| 2021-09-27 | Michèle Audette | QC (De Salaberry) | NA | ISG | Changed affiliation |
| 2021-10-06 | Bernadette Clement | ON | NA | ISG | Changed affiliation |
| 2021-10-07 | Karen Sorensen | AB | NA | ISG | Changed affiliation |
| 2021-10-08 | Hassan Yussuff | ON | NA | ISG | Changed affiliation |
| 2021-10-18 | Marilou McPhedran | MB | ISG | NA | Changed affiliation |
| 2021-10-31 | Doug Black | AB | CSG | Vacant | Resigned |
| 2021-11-20 | Josée Forest-Niesing | ON | ISG | Vacant | Died in office |
| 2022-01-03 | Thanh Hai Ngo | ON | CPC | Vacant | Mandatory retirement |
| 2022-02-04 | Dennis Patterson | NU | CPC | CSG | Changed affiliation |
| 2022-03-14 | Mary Jane McCallum | MB | ISG | NA | Changed affiliation |
| 2022-03-18 | Diane Griffin | PE | CSG | Vacant | Mandatory retirement |
| 2022-05-06 | Terry Mercer | NS | PSG | Vacant | Mandatory retirement |
| 2022-06-03 | Howard Wetston | ON | ISG | Vacant | Mandatory retirement |
| 2022-06-27 | Michèle Audette | QC (De Salaberry) | ISG | PSG | Changed affiliation |
| 2022-08-04 | Larry Smith | QC (Saurel) | CPC | CSG | Changed affiliation |
| 2022-09-26 | Ian Shugart | ON | Vacant | NA | Appointed |
| 2022-09-26 | Gigi Osler | MB | Vacant | NA | Appointed |
| 2022-10-02 | Vernon White | ON | CSG | Vacant | Resigned |
| 2022-10-24 | Larry Campbell | BC | CSG | NA | Changed affiliation |
| 2022-11-10 | Margo Greenwood | BC | Vacant | NA | Appointed |
| 2022-11-21 | Sharon Burey | ON | Vacant | NA | Appointed |
| 2022-11-21 | Andrew Cardozo | ON | Vacant | NA | Appointed |
| 2022-11-21 | Rebecca Patterson | ON | Vacant | NA | Appointed |
| 2023-01-10 | Gigi Osler | MB | NA | CSG | Changed affiliation |
| 2023-01-12 | Rebecca Patterson | ON | NA | CSG | Changed affiliation |
| 2023-01-24 | Margo Greenwood | BC | NA | ISG | Changed affiliation |
| 2023-01-31 | Daniel Christmas | NS | ISG | Vacant | Resigned |
| 2023-01-31 | Sandra Lovelace Nicholas | NB | PSG | Vacant | Resigned |
| 2023-02-09 | Dennis Dawson | QC (Lauzon) | PSG | Vacant | Resigned |
| 2023-02-21 | Sharon Burey | ON | NA | CSG | Changed affiliation |
| 2023-02-23 | Andrew Cardozo | ON | NA | PSG | Changed affiliation |
| 2023-02-28 | Larry Campbell | BC | NA | Vacant | Mandatory retirement |
| 2023-05-03 | Beverly Jane MacAdam | PE | Vacant | NA | Appointed |
| 2023-05-03 | Iris Petten | NL | Vacant | NA | Appointed |
| 2023-05-12 | George Furey | NL | NA | Vacant | Mandatory retirement |
| 2023-05-15 | Patricia Bovey | MB | PSG | Vacant | Mandatory retirement |
| 2023-07-06 | Judy White | NL | Vacant | NA | Appointed |
| 2023-07-06 | Paul Prosper | NS | Vacant | NA | Appointed |
| 2023-07-11 | Colin Deacon | NS | ISG | CSG | Changed affiliation |
| 2023-08-09 | Michèle Audette | QC (De Salaberry) | PSG | NA | Changed affiliation |
| 2023-09-07 | Sabi Marwah | ON | ISG | Vacant | Resigned |
| 2023-09-15 | Beverly Jane MacAdam | PE | NA | ISG | Changed affiliation |
| 2023-09-19 | Iris Petten | NL | NA | ISG | Changed affiliation |
| 2023-10-25 | Ian Shugart | ON | NA | Vacant | Died in office |
| 2023-10-31 | Joan Kingston | NB | Vacant | NA | Appointed |
| 2023-10-31 | John M. McNair | NB | Vacant | NA | Appointed |
| 2023-10-31 | Krista Ann Ross | NB | Vacant | NA | Appointed |
| 2023-10-31 | Réjean Aucoin | NS | Vacant | NA | Appointed |
| 2023-10-31 | Rodger Cuzner | NS | Vacant | NA | Appointed |
| 2023-11-08 | Paul Prosper | NS | NA | CSG | Changed affiliation |
| 2023-11-22 | Judy White | NL | NA | PSG | Changed affiliation |
| 2023-12-14 | Joan Kingston | NB | NA | ISG | Changed affiliation |
| 2023-12-15 | Rodger Cuzner | NS | NA | PSG | Changed affiliation |
| 2023-12-20 | Marnie McBean | ON | Vacant | NA | Appointed |
| 2023-12-20 | Paulette Senior | ON | Vacant | NA | Appointed |
| 2023-12-20 | Toni Varone | ON | Vacant | NA | Appointed |
| 2023-12-27 | Michèle Audette | QC (De Salaberry) | NA | PSG | Changed affiliation |
| 2023-12-30 | Dennis Patterson | NU | CSG | Vacant | Mandatory retirement |
| 2024-01-10 | Krista Ann Ross | NB | NA | CSG | Changed affiliation |
| 2024-01-15 | John M. McNair | NB | NA | ISG | Changed affiliation |
| 2024-01-17 | Renée Dupuis | QC (The Laurentides) | ISG | Vacant | Mandatory retirement |
| 2024-01-22 | Mary Robinson | PE | Vacant | NA | Appointed |
| 2024-01-28 | Mohammad Al Zaibak | ON | Vacant | NA | Appointed |
| 2024-01-30 | Réjean Aucoin | NS | NA | CSG | Changed affiliation |
| 2024-02-06 | Frances Lankin | ON | ISG | NA | Changed affiliation |
| 2024-02-12 | Pierre-Hugues Boisvenu | QC (La Salles) | CPC | Vacant | Mandatory retirement |
| 2024-02-13 | Manuelle Oudar | QC (La Salles) | Vacant | NA | Appointed |
| 2024-04-10 | Marnie McBean | ON | NA | ISG | Changed affiliation |
| 2024-04-14 | Percy Mockler | NB (St. Leonard) | CPC | Vacant | Mandatory retirement |
| 2024-04-18 | Toni Varone | ON | NA | ISG | Changed affiliation |
| 2024-05-02 | Manuelle Oudar | QC (La Salles) | NA | ISG | Changed affiliation |
| 2024-05-13 | David Adams Richards | NB | CSG | NA | Changed affiliation |
| 2024-05-28 | Frances Lankin | ON | NA | ISG | Changed affiliation |
| 2024-06-03 | Mary Robinson | PE | NA | CSG | Changed affiliation |
| 2024-06-04 | Mohammad Al Zaibak | ON | NA | CSG | Changed affiliation |
| 2024-06-10 | Victor Oh | ON (Mississauga) | CPC | Vacant | Mandatory retirement |
| 2024-06-28 | Victor Boudreau | NB | Vacant | NA | Appointed |
| 2024-08-17 | Charles Adler | MB | Vacant | NA | Appointed |
| 2024-08-17 | Tracy Muggli | SK | Vacant | NA | Appointed |
| 2024-08-20 | Mobina Jaffer | BC | ISG | Vacant | Mandatory retirement |
| 2024-08-30 | Iris Petten | NL | ISG | NA | Changed affiliation |
| 2024-08-31 | Daryl Fridhandler | AB | Vacant | NA | Appointed |
| 2024-08-31 | Kristopher Wells | AB | Vacant | NA | Appointed |
| 2024-09-10 | Pierre Moreau | QC (The Laurentides) | Vacant | NA | Appointed |
| 2024-09-25 | Suze Youance | QC (Lauzon) | Vacant | NA | Appointed |
| 2024-10-13 | Diane Bellemare | QC (Alma) | PSG | Vacant | Mandatory retirement |
| 2024-10-16 | Victor Boudreau | NB | NA | ISG | Changed affiliation |
| 2024-10-21 | Frances Lankin | ON | ISG | Vacant | Resigned |
| 2024-10-22 | Daryl Fridhandler | AB | NA | PSG | Changed affiliation |
| 2024-10-25 | Paulette Senior | ON | NA | ISG | Changed affiliation |
| 2024-11-01 | Clément Gignac | QC (Kennebec) | PSG | CSG | Changed affiliation |
| 2024-11-05 | Ratna Omidvar | ON | ISG | Vacant | Mandatory retirement |
| 2024-11-18 | Jane Cordy | NS | PSG | Vacant | Resigned |
| 2024-11-20 | Tracy Muggli | SK | NA | PSG | Changed affiliation |
| 2024-11-21 | Pierre Moreau | QC (The Laurentides) | NA | PSG | Changed affiliation |
| 2024-11-27 | Suze Youance | QC (Lauzon) | NA | ISG | Changed affiliation |
| 2024-12-08 | Stephen Greene | NS | CSG | Vacant | Mandatory retirement |
| 2024-12-18 | Brent Cotter | SK | ISG | Vacant | Mandatory retirement |
| 2024-12-19 | Nancy Karetak-Lindell | NU | Vacant | NA | Appointed |
| 2024-12-19 | Allister Surette | NS | Vacant | NA | Appointed |
| 2025-02-01 | Nancy Hartling | NB | ISG | Vacant | Mandatory retirement |
| 2025-02-02 | Jean-Guy Dagenais | QC (Victoria) | CSG | Vacant | Mandatory retirement |
| 2025-02-07 | Baltej Singh Dhillon | BC | Vacant | NA | Appointed |
| 2025-02-07 | Martine Hébert | QC (Victoria) | Vacant | NA | Appointed |
| 2025-02-07 | Todd Lewis | SK | Vacant | NA | Appointed |
| 2025-02-12 | Allister Surette | NS | NA | ISG | Changed affiliation |
| 2025-02-14 | Danièle Henkel | QC (Alma) | Vacant | NA | Appointed |
| 2025-02-28 | Todd Lewis | SK | NA | CSG | Changed affiliation |
| 2025-02-28 | Duncan Wilson | BC | Vacant | NA | Appointed |
| 2025-03-04 | Kristopher Wells | AB | NA | PSG | Changed affiliation |
| 2025-03-07 | Dawn Arnold | NB | Vacant | NA | Appointed |
| 2025-03-07 | Katherine Hay | ON | Vacant | NA | Appointed |
| 2025-03-07 | Tony Ince | NS | Vacant | NA | Appointed |
| 2025-03-07 | Farah Mohamed | ON | Vacant | NA | Appointed |
| 2025-03-07 | Sandra Pupatello | ON | Vacant | NA | Appointed |
| 2025-03-25 | Nancy Karetak-Lindell | NU | NA | ISG | Changed affiliation |
| 2025-04-04 | Duncan Wilson | BC | NA | PSG | Changed affiliation |
| 2025-04-08 | Danièle Henkel | QC (Alma) | NA | PSG | Changed affiliation |
| 2025-04-09 | Martine Hébert | QC (Victoria) | NA | ISG | Changed affiliation |
| 2025-04-10 | Baltej Singh Dhillon | BC | NA | ISG | Changed affiliation |

== See also ==
- 2021 Canadian federal budget
- 2022 Canadian federal budget
- 2023 Canadian federal budget
- 2024 Canadian federal budget
- Affordable Housing and Groceries Act, Bill C-56
- Countering Foreign Interference Act
- Official Opposition Shadow Cabinet of the 44th Parliament of Canada
- Online Streaming Act, Bill C-11
- Women in the 44th Canadian Parliament
