= Canadian Senate Standing Committee on Transport and Communication =

Standing committee of the Senate of Canada

The Standing Senate Committee on Transport and Communications (TRCM) is one of the oldest standing committees of the Senate of Canada, having been first created in 1867 under the name of the Banking, Commerce and Railways Committee. In 1945, it was recommended that a committee on Transport and Communications be created.

== Responsibilities ==
Over the years, the mandate has evolved, but subject areas for which the committee is responsible include:

- Transport and communications by land, air, water, and space, be this by radio, telephone, telegraph, wire, cable, microwave, wireless, television, satellite, broadcasting, post, or any other means, method or form.
- Tourist traffic.
- Common carriers; and
- Navigation, shipping and navigable waters.

== Members ==
Caucus	Member	Province
Conservative	Larry Smith, chair	QC
Independent Senators Group	Donna Dasko, deputy chair	ON
Independent Senators Group	Dawn Arnold	NB
Canadian Senators Group	Réjean Aucoin	NS
Independent Senators Group	René Cormier	NB
Canadian Senators Group	Todd Lewis	SK
Conservative	Fabian Manning	NL
Progressive Senate Group	Julie Miville-Dechêne	QC
Independent Senators Group	Farah Mohamed	ON
Canadian Senators Group	Jim Quinn	NB
Independent Senators Group	Paula Simons	AB
Progressive Senate Group	Duncan Wilson	BC

The Representative of the Government in the Senate and Leader of the Opposition in the Senate are both ex-officio members of the committee.

== See also ==
- Canadian House of Commons Standing Committee on Transport, Infrastructure and Communities
- Transport Canada
