= Canadian Senate Standing Committee on Rules, Procedures and the Rights of Parliament =

Committee of the Senate of Canada

The Senate Standing Committee on Rules, Procedures and the Rights of Parliament (RPRD) (French: Commité permanent du Sénat du Règlement, de la procédure et des droits du Parlement) is a committee of the Senate of Canada. As a standing committee, the rules of the Senate re-establish the committee at the opening of every new session of the Senate (otherwise the committee would permanently dissolve). The committee is charged with considering the possible repercussions and consequences of the motion of Hugh Segal to televise the proceedings of the Senate for public viewing.

== Mandate ==
The committee's mandate is:

1. on its own initiative to propose, from time to time, amendments to the rules for consideration by the Senate;
2. upon reference from the Senate, to examine and, if required, report on any question of privilege; and
3. to consider the orders and customs of the Senate and privileges of Parliament.

== Members ==
As of the 45th Canadian Parliament:

Caucus	Member	Province
Progressive Senate Group	Peter Harder, chair	ON
Conservative	Denise Batters, deputy chair	SK
Canadian Senators Group	Percy Downe, deputy chair	PE
Independent Senators Group	Pierrette Ringuette, deputy chair	NB
Canadian Senators Group	Sharon Burey	ON
Independent Senators Group	Bev Busson	BC
Independent Senators Group	Chantal Petitclerc	QC
Independent Senators Group	Raymonde Saint-Germain	QC
Independent Senators Group	Allister Surette	NS
Conservative	David Wells	NL
Progressive Senate Group	Kristopher Wells	AB
Progressive Senate Group	Judy White	NL
Independent Senators Group	Suze Youance	QC
Independent Senators Group	Hassan Yussuff	ON

The Representative of the Government in the Senate and Leader of the Opposition in the Senate are both ex-officio members of the committee.
