= Canadian Senate Standing Committee on Foreign Affairs and International Trade =

Standing committee of the Senate of Canada

The Senate Standing Committee on Foreign Affairs and International Trade (AEFA) (French: Commité permanent du Sénat des Affaires étrangères et commerce international) is a standing committee of the Senate of Canada, active since 1938. As a standing committee, the rules of the Senate re-establish the committee at the opening of every new session (otherwise the committee would permanently dissolve).

== Role ==
The Standing Senate Committee on Foreign Affairs and International Trade is mandated to study matters relating to foreign relations and international trade generally. The committee has conducted studies and examined bills related to foreign policy, diplomacy, international crises, armed conflicts, peace and stability, economic sanctions, foreign aid as well as international trade.

== Members ==
As of 45th Canadian Parliament:

Caucus	Member	Province
Independent Senators Group	Peter Boehm, chair	ON
Progressive Senate Group	Peter Harder, deputy chair	ON
Canadian Senators Group	Charles Adler	MB
Canadian Senators Group	Mohammad Al Zaibak	ON
Conservative	Salma Ataullahjan	ON
Independent Senators Group	Mary Coyle	NS
Progressive Senate Group	Amina Gerba	QC
Independent Senators Group	Martine Hébert	QC
Conservative	Michael L. MacDonald	NS
Independent Senators Group	Mohamed-Iqbal Ravalia	NL
Progressive Senate Group	Duncan Wilson	BC
Independent Senators Group	Yuen Pau Woo	BC

The Representative of the Government in the Senate and Leader of the Opposition in the Senate are both ex-officio members of the committee.
