= Liberal–NDP confidence and supply agreement =

Former agreement between the Liberal and New Democratic Party

Delivering for Canadians Now, A Supply and Confidence Agreement
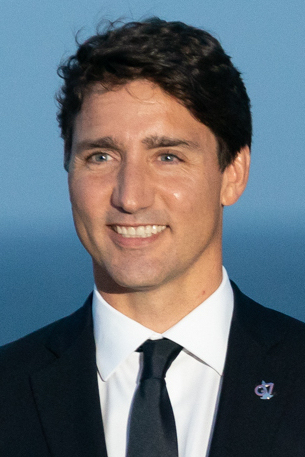

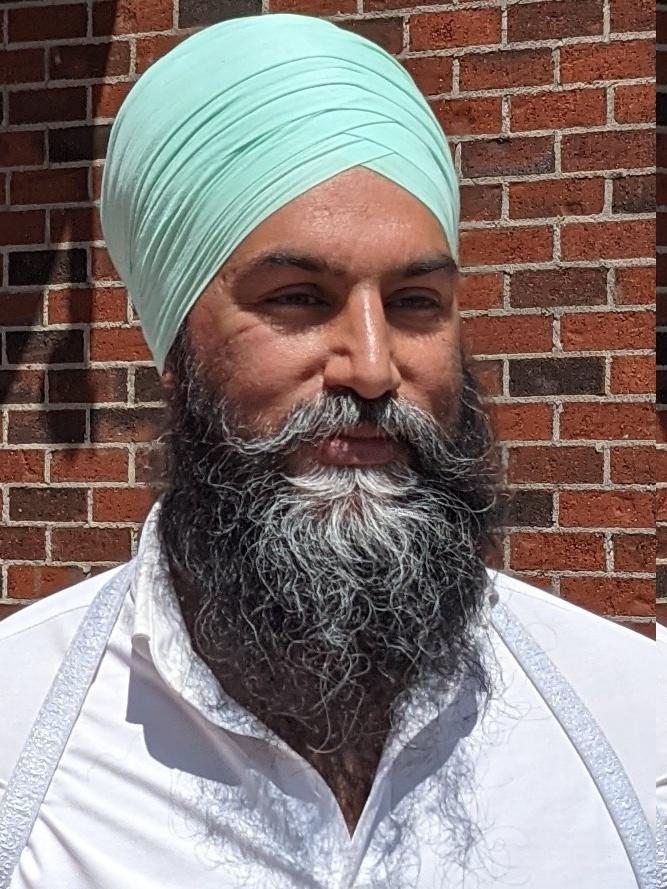
Justin Trudeau (Liberal leader) and Jagmeet Singh (NDP leader)
- Type: Confidence and supply
- Context: Minority government in the 44th Canadian Parliament
- Effective: March 22, 2022 – September 4, 2024 (Note: The agreement was initially scheduled to expire in June 2025, but was ended early due to the NDP's withdrawal from the agreement on September 4, 2024.)
- Condition: That the NDP support the government on votes of confidence in exchange for Liberal co-operation on some of the NDP's legislative objectives
- Parties: Liberal; New Democratic
- Languages: English; French

Delivering for Canadians Now, A Supply and Confidence Agreement (French: Obtenir des résultats dès maintenant pour les Canadiens : une entente de soutien et de confiance), commonly known as the Liberal–NDP confidence and supply agreement, was a parliamentary arrangement made between the Liberal Party of Canada and the New Democratic Party (NDP), whereby the NDP, led by Jagmeet Singh, agreed to support Prime Minister Justin Trudeau's minority government on matters of confidence in exchange for support on some NDP policy priorities. This resulted in the creation of the Canadian Dental Care Plan and the first steps toward a national Pharmacare program.

It was the first agreement of its kind in Canadian federal parliamentary history, and it essentially gave the Liberal government a working majority from March 22, 2022 to September 4, 2024 at which point the NDP withdrew from the agreement. Contrary to statements from rival politicians and some media outlets, this agreement did not create a Liberal–NDP coalition government, as no NDP politicians were appointed to ministerial positions.

== Background ==
In the 2021 Canadian federal election, the Liberals led by Justin Trudeau won 159 (Note: Most reports indicate that the Liberals won 160 seats, due to the election of Liberal candidate Kevin Vuong. Vuong was dropped by the Liberal Party after an Elections Canada nomination deadline, and was listed as a Liberal on the ballot despite both the party and Vuong clarifying that he would not sit as a Liberal MP if elected.) seats and were elected for a third consecutive term. However, they fell short of reaching the majority threshold by 11 seats. The NDP led by Jagmeet Singh increased the size of their caucus by 1 seat, and remained as the fourth party in the House of Commons with 25 seats. It originally appeared that the Liberals were not planning on seeking a confidence and supply agreement, which would have been consistent with their first minority government between 2019 and 2021. There were some talks between the Liberals and NDP immediately following the 2021 election but they were not a high priority for either party and were put aside.

On March 14, 2022, Trudeau hosted Singh at 7 Rideau Gate to discuss the idea of a confidence and supply agreement between their respective parties, leading to a tentative agreement. In an interview with Mark Critch on March 30, 2022, Singh stated that talks for a confidence and supply agreement were resumed in January following a phone call from Trudeau to congratulate Singh for the birth of his first daughter Anhad. This led Singh to nickname the agreement the Anhad Accord. The final agreement titled Delivering for Canadians Now, A Supply and Confidence Agreement was reached on March 22, 2022.

=== Historical Liberal–NDP relations ===
The confidence and supply agreement made in 2022 was the first official parliamentary collaboration between the Liberals and the NDP, although it was not the first time that both parties co-operated with each other to either support a Liberal government, or defeat a Conservative/Progressive Conservative government.

==== Co-operation during Liberal governments ====
King–Woodsworth

Following the 1925 Canadian federal election, the Liberals led by William Lyon Mackenzie King formed a minority government during the 15th Canadian Parliament. J. S. Woodsworth, the leader of the Ginger Group and eventual founder of the Co-operative Commonwealth Federation, offered his support to the government in exchange for the Liberals to support his legislation to enact an old age pension.

Pearson–Douglas

Lester B. Pearson formed two consecutive minority governments (26th and 27th parliaments) from 1963 to 1968. During this time, the Liberals survived motions of Confidence with the support of New Democratic MPs led by Tommy Douglas. During this period, the government brought in several updated social programs, including universal health care, the Canada Pension Plan, and the Canada Student Loan Program.

P. Trudeau–D. Lewis

In 1972, Pierre Trudeau won his second consecutive electoral mandate, but his majority government had been reduced to a minority. Like his predecessor, Trudeau relied on the support of New Democratic MPs (led by David Lewis) in the 29th Canadian Parliament to remain in government. During this parliament, the Liberals supported an NDP motion to establish a nationalized oil company, which ultimately led to the creation of Petro-Canada.

==== Co-operation in opposition ====
Dion–Layton

After the 2008 federal election, the Conservative government headed by Stephen Harper remained a minority government for the 40th Parliament. A dispute occurred between the government and the opposition parties following the signing of a coalition agreement between the Liberals (who held the second-most seats in Parliament at the time) and the New Democrats (who held the fourth-most seats in Parliament at the time). Although Liberal leader Stéphane Dion and NDP leader Jack Layton were intending on defeating the government in a motion of no confidence, the subsequent prorogation of parliament by Steven Harper prevented such a vote from taking place. When Parliament was reconvened in January 2009, the Liberal Party under the new interim leadership of Michael Ignatieff had abandoned the plan and agreed to support a modified Conservative budget.

== Terms of the agreement ==
=== Duration ===
The final agreement included a section describing the terms of the agreement in which the NDP caucus agreed to support the government on confidence and budgetary matters of the 44th Canadian Parliament until June 2025. The agreement also required that the Liberals govern for the whole duration of the agreement, essentially preventing the Liberals from calling a snap election prior to June 2025 without the approval of the NDP. However, the New Democrats left the agreement early in September 2024, as they felt the Liberals were not upholding their end of the agreement.

=== Collaboration on key policy priorities ===
The agreement maintained that both parties work towards advancing key policy priorities broken into seven categories.

1. A better healthcare system
2. Making life more affordable for people
3. Tackling the climate crisis and creating good paying jobs
4. A better deal for workers
5. Reconciliation
6. A fairer tax system
7. Making democracy work for people

== Effects of the agreement ==
=== Legislation passed ===
- Canadian Dental Care Plan
- Pharmacare

=== Survived votes of confidence ===
- June 9, 2022 – 2022 federal budget
- June 8, 2023 – 2023 federal budget
- March 21, 2024 – Opposition Motion (Carbon tax election)
- June 19, 2024 – 2024 federal budget

== NDP withdrawal and aftermath ==
On September 4, 2024, Singh announced in a video posted on social media that he had ended the confidence and supply agreement, stating that the Liberals were continuously caving to corporate greed and had let Canadians down. This announcement came soon after the Liberal government attempted to resolve the 2024 Canada railway dispute by turning the situation over to the Canada Industrial Relations Board, which ordered the employees back to work. This move frustrated the New Democrats as they argued that it undermined Teamsters Canada's ability to strike and seek a better collective bargaining agreement. It was also alleged that Singh withdrew from the agreement to distance themselves from the Liberal Party, who were becoming incredibly unpopular according to opinion polls.

Despite the termination of the agreement, the NDP still voted against motions of no confidence until 2025. On January 6, 2025 following the resignation of Trudeau as prime minister, Singh vowed to bring down the government at the earliest possible opportunity. However this opportunity never occurred, as parliament was prorogued and eventually dissolved before a motion of no confidence could take place.

The new Liberal leader and prime minister Mark Carney led the Liberals to another minority government in the 2025 Canadian federal election on April 28, 2025, while Singh's party was decimated nationwide, with the NDP losing official party status and Singh losing his seat in the riding of Burnaby Central. In Carney's victory speech, he stated that he "saluted the contribution of Jagmeet Singh" in "leading our progressive values", which appeared to reference the NDP led priorities that were accomplished during the 44th Parliament.

During the 2026 New Democratic Party leadership election, the NDP's relationship with the Liberal Party was an important topic of discussion. Rob Ashton, the Canadian Area President of the International Longshore and Warehouse Union and leadership candidate, had criticized the agreement ahead of the 2025 federal election and claimed that the party was "in really bad shape" at the federal level, because workers were "running towards the Conservative Party" instead. At the party's 2026 convention, many of the speakers denounced the Liberal Party for ignoring the needs of Canadian workers, and it became clear that another deal with the Liberals seemed highly unlikely due to the alleged negative impact it had on the New Democrat's electoral performance. In a speech delivered by interim leader Don Davies, he joked that Mark Carney, despite playing goalie in his collegiate hockey career, was actually a right winger.

== See also ==
- History of the Liberal Party of Canada
- History of the New Democratic Party
- 2017 NDP–Green confidence and supply agreement (British Columbia)
