= Journal of LGBT Youth =

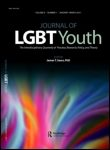
- Discipline: Gender studies
- Language: English
- Edited by: Kristopher Wells

Publication details
- Former name(s): Journal of Gay & Lesbian Issues in Education
- History: 2003-present
- Publisher: Routledge
- Frequency: Quarterly
- Open access: Hybrid
- Impact factor: 2.2 (2023)

Standard abbreviations
- ISO 4: J. LGBT Youth

Indexing
- ISSN: 1936-1653 (print); 1936-1661 (web)
- LCCN: 2007214260
- OCLC no.: 243601208

Links
- Journal homepage; Online access; Online archive

The Journal of LGBT Youth is a quarterly peer-reviewed academic journal covering gender studies especially as pertaining to LGBT youth. It was established in 2003 as the Journal of Gay & Lesbian Issues in Education, obtaining its current title in 2008, and is published by Routledge. The founding editor-in-chief was James T. Sears, who was succeeded by Kristopher Wells (MacEwan University).

== Abstracting and indexing ==
The journal is abstracted and indexed in:

- CINAHL
- EBSCO databases
- Education Resources Information Center
- Emerging Sources Citation Index
- International Bibliography of Periodical Literature
- Modern Language Association Database
- PsycINFO
- Scopus

According to the Journal Citation Reports, the journal has a 2023 impact factor of x.x.
