= 2024 Canadian federal budget =

2024 budget of the Canadian federal government
- Submitted to: House of Commons
- Presented: 16 April 2024
- Passed: 20 June 2024
- Country: Canada
- Parliament: 44th
- Party: Liberal
- Finance minister: Chrystia Freeland
- Total revenue: CA$498 billion (projected)
- Total expenditures: CA$538 billion (projected)
- Deficit: CA$40 billion (projected)
- GDP: TBA
- Website: Budget 2024

The 2024 Canadian federal budget for the fiscal years of 2024–25, known as Budget 2024, was presented to the House of Commons by Finance Minister Chrystia Freeland on 16 April 2024. The budget's slogan is "Fairness for every generation", suggesting the government planned to help younger people. This budget was the final budget presented under the premiership of Justin Trudeau and the 29th Canadian Ministry, with Trudeau and the 29th Ministry being succeeded by Mark Carney as prime minister and the 30th Canadian Ministry, respectively, on March 14, 2025.

== Background ==
In March 2022, the New Democratic Party agreed to a confidence and supply deal with Justin Trudeau's Liberal Party.

== Measures ==
The budget's main goal is to reduce the cost of living.

Notable for science policy were increases in research spending, in particular $2.6 billion to train Canadian researchers through grants, scholarships and fellowships for graduate students, $1.3 billion to improve affordability of post-secondary education through grants, interest-free loans, and housing allowances for students, and $734 million for research infrastructure. These expenditures are expected to support more scientific research and innovation in Canada.

== Legislative history ==
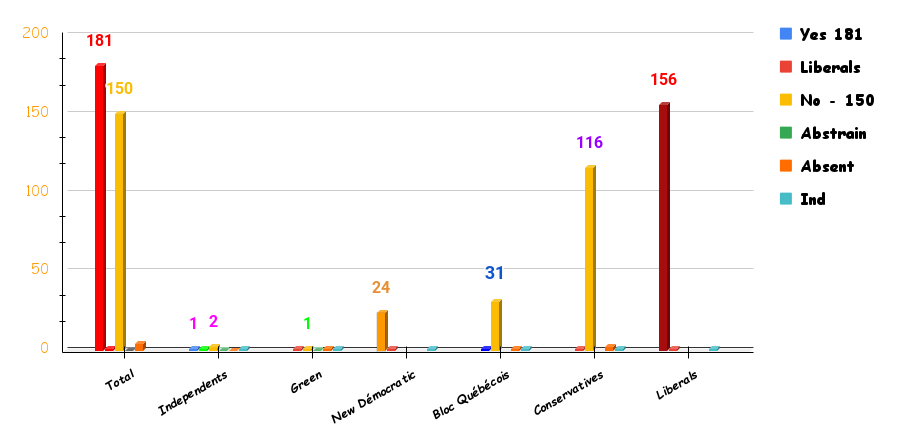
Legislature Results

House of Commons vote on the Budget Implementation Act, 2024, No. 1
Party	Yea	Nay	Abstention	Absent
Liberals	151			5
Conservatives		114		3
Bloc Québécois		32		
New Democratic	24			1
Green		2		
Independents	2	2		
Total	177	150	0	9
