= Brian Francis (politician) =

Canadian politician

The Honourable Brian Francis
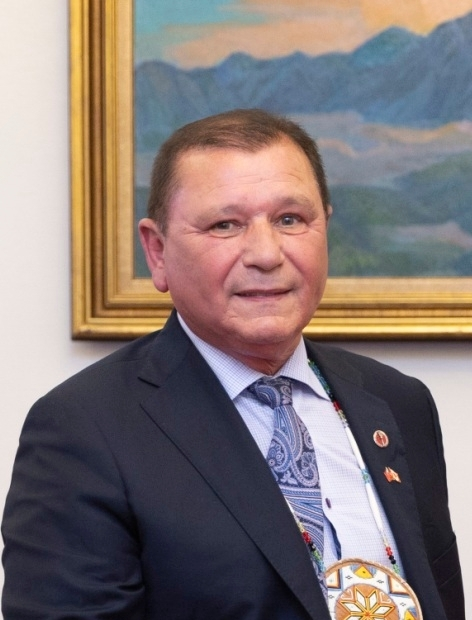

Canadian Senator from Prince Edward Island
- Incumbent
- Assumed office October 11, 2018
- Nominated by: Justin Trudeau
- Appointed by: Julie Payette

Personal details
- Born: September 28, 1957 (age 68) Lennox Island, Prince Edward Island, Canada
- Party: Progressive Senate Group

Brian Francis (born September 28, 1957) is a Canadian Mi'kmaw leader, Chief of the Abegweit First Nation from 2007 to 2018. On 11 October 2018 he was appointed to the Senate of Canada representing Prince Edward Island. He is the first Mi'kmaq from Prince Edward Island appointed to the Senate.

Prior to becoming chief, he was an Aboriginal programs co-ordinator with the Department of Fisheries and Oceans.
