= Andrew Cardozo =

Canadian senator

The Honourable Andrew Cardozo

Canadian Senator from Ontario
- Incumbent
- Assumed office 21 November 2022
- Nominated by: Justin Trudeau
- Appointed by: Mary Simon
- Monarch: Charles III

Personal details
- Party: Progressive Senate Group
- Website: senatorcardozo.ca

Andrew Cardozo is a Canadian politician. He was appointed to the Senate of Canada by Governor General Mary Simon on November 21, 2022, on the advice of Prime Minister Justin Trudeau. Cardozo is a member of the Progressive Senate Group.

== Biography ==
Prior to his appointment to the Senate, Cardozo was the president of the Pearson Centre for Progressive Policy for nearly ten years. He is a former commissioner of the Canadian Radio-television and Telecommunications Commission. He also was an adjunct prof at Carleton University. Cardozo currently sits on the Standing Senate Committees on National Finance and on National Security, Defence and Veterans Affairs.

== Honours ==
Cardozo has been the recipient of numerous awards such as the 2023 DreamKeepers Citation for Outstanding Leadership award commemorating the historic role of Dr. Martin Luther King Jr, the 125th Anniversary of the Confederation of Canada Medal, the Reelworld Film Festival Guardian Angel Award (Toronto), Big Brother of the Year (Ottawa), and the King Charles III Coronation Medal.

== Publications ==
=== Bibliography ===
- The Battle Over Multiculturalism: Does it Help Or Hinder Canadian Unity? Ottawa, PSI Pub., 1997, Cardozo, Andrew and Musto, Louis, eds.
