= Donna Dasko =

Canadian senator from Ontario

The Honourable Donna Dasko
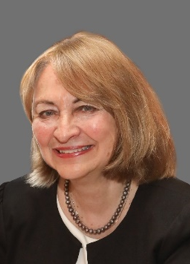

Canadian Senator from Ontario
- In office June 6, 2018 – August 19, 2026
- Nominated by: Justin Trudeau
- Appointed by: Julie Payette

Personal details
- Born: August 19, 1951 (age 75)
- Party: Independent Senators Group

Donna Dasko (born August 19, 1951) is a Canadian senator from Ontario. She was nominated by Prime Minister Justin Trudeau and appointed to the Senate on June 6, 2018.

She served for several years on three committees: the Senate Standing Committees on Transport and Communication (serving as Deputy Chair); National Security, Defence and Veterans Affairs; and Social Affairs, Science and Technology from the 42nd to the 45th Canadian Parliament.

== Education ==
She holds a Ph.D and MA from the University of Toronto and a BA (Hons) from the University of Manitoba.

== Career ==
Before her appointment to the Senate, Dasko was Senior Vice-President of Environics Research Group Ltd. a national public-opinion research company. She led research projects for federal and provincial governments, private-sector clients, and non-governmental organizations on topics including the economy, budget priorities, tobacco control, health promotion, and national unity. She led the development of media-sponsored polling, including the Globe–Environics Poll and special-feature polling for the CBC.

She is a distinguished fellow at the University of Toronto's Munk School of Global Affairs & Public Policy and taught in the master's program before her Senate appointment.

== Advocacy and community involvement ==
Dasko has advocated for women’s representation in politics. She is a co-founder and former National Chair of Equal Voice, a non-partisan organization that supports the election of more women in Canada. She served as a director of the Women’s Legal Education and Action Fund (LEAF) and, in 2015, co-founded the Campaign for an Equal Senate for Canada. She has also worked with the National Democratic Institute in Washington, D.C., on projects related to women in politics internationally.

Her community roles have included President (board chair) of St. Stephen’s Community House, Director of the United Way of Greater Toronto, Governor of the Canadian Unity Council, Chair of the National CEO Roundtable for the Alzheimer Society, Advisor to GreenPAC, and Director of the Canadian Youth Foundation.

== Personal life ==
Dasko resides in Toronto, Ontario. She has two children, a daughter and a son.
