= 2022 Canadian federal budget =

2022 budget of the Canadian federal government
- Official logo of Budget 2022
- Submitted to: House of Commons
- Presented: 7 April 2022
- Passed: 9 June 2022
- Country: Canada
- Parliament: 44th
- Party: Liberal
- Finance minister: Chrystia Freeland
- Total revenue: CA$408.4 billion (projected)
- Total expenditures: CA$452.3 billion (projected)
- Deficit: CA$36.4 billion (projected)
- GDP: TBA
- Website: Budget 2022

The 2022 Canadian federal budget for the fiscal years of 2022–23, known as Budget 2022, was presented to the House of Commons by Finance Minister Chrystia Freeland on 7 April 2022.

== Background ==
The COVID-19 pandemic had forced the Justin Trudeau government to introduce a large number of federal aid programs to deal with the economic impact of the crisis. As a result, Canada's debt-to-GDP ratio increased in 2020 and 2021.

In March 2022, the New Democratic Party agreed to a confidence and supply deal with Justin Trudeau's Liberal Party.

== Measures ==
The budget's main goal is to reduce Canada's debt-to-GDP ratio, mostly through a review of all government spending.

Our ability to spend is not infinite. The time for extraordinary COVID support is over.

— Chrystia Freeland, Budget 2022: Address by the Deputy Prime Minister and Minister of Finance

However, the budget increases Canada's military expenditures. It also includes a limited dental care program, as promised in the Liberal-NDP deal.

== Reactions ==
According to left-leaning political scientist David Moscrop, the budget is a fiscally conservative document that includes too few new social programs for Canadians.

== Aftermath ==
=== Legislative history ===
House of Commons vote on the Budget Implementation Act, 2022, No. 1
Party	Yea	Nay	Abstention	Absent
Liberals	149	0	6	3
Conservatives	0	112	6	1
Bloc Québécois	29	0	0	3
New Democratic	24	0	0	1
Green	0	2	0	0
Independents	0	1	0	0
Total	202	115	12	8

=== Execution ===
Budgetary items in billions of dollars
Element	2021–2022	2022-2023	
Element	Actual	Budget	Actual
Tax revenues	350.67	342.10	379.23
Other revenues	62.61	66.30	68.59
Program expenditures	(468.92)	(425.40)	(438.56)
Public debt charge	(24.49)	(26.90)	(34.96)
Actuarial losses	(10.19)	(8.90)	(9.63)
Deficit	(90.32)	(52.80)	(35.32)
