= Daryl Fridhandler =

Canadian senator and lawyer

The Honourable Daryl Fridhandler KC

Canadian Senator from Alberta
- Incumbent
- Assumed office August 31, 2024
- Nominated by: Justin Trudeau
- Appointed by: Mary Simon

Personal details
- Born: October 9, 1956 (age 69)
- Party: Progressive Senate Group
- Other political affiliations: Liberal
- Education: McGill University (BA); Dalhousie University (LLB); New York University (LLM)
- Profession: Lawyer

Daryl Fridhandler KC (born October 9, 1956) is a Canadian corporate lawyer, arbitrator, businessman, and politician. He was appointed to the Senate of Canada on August 31, 2024. He was nominated by the Independent Advisory Board for Senate Appointments and appointed by Governor General of Canada Mary Simon on the recommendation of Prime Minister Justin Trudeau.

Fridhandler joined the Alberta bar in 1984. He has been a partner in the Calgary-based law firm of Burnet, Duckworth & Palmer LLP since 1990 and is on the board of directors of Enmax, an electricity provider.

The appointments of Fridhandler and Kristopher Wells as senators for Alberta were criticized by Alberta Premier Danielle Smith for ignoring the results of the province's unofficial Senate nominee election. Smith issued a statement saying: "Despite our province's repeated democratic election of senators-in-waiting ready to represent Albertans’ interests, [Prime Minister Trudeau] has chosen to appoint left-wing partisans who will do whatever he and the Liberals order them to."

== Education ==
He holds a Bachelor of Arts (1980) from McGill University, a Bachelor of Laws (1983) from Dalhousie University, and a Master of Laws (2016) from New York University.

== Political career ==
Fridhandler was the Liberal Party of Canada's election co-chair in Alberta from 2004 and 2009 under then-Liberal leaders Paul Martin and Michael Ignatieff and has donated at least $30,000 to the Liberal Party between 2004 and 2023, including $1,200 to Justin Trudeau's 2013 Liberal Party of Canada leadership election campaign. He has also donated to the Green Party of Canada, the Liberal Party of Alberta, the Alberta Party, the Progressive Conservative Party of Alberta, and the New Democratic Party of Alberta. He was also the campaign chair for former Calgary mayor Dave Bronconnier for five municipal campaigns. He served on the finance committee of the Alberta Progressive Conservative Party from 2011 to 2015 and worked on Gary Mar's 2011 Progressive Conservative Association of Alberta leadership election campaign.

== Community work ==
Fridhandler has also been chair of the Alberta Ballet, Calgary Economic Development, and Arts Commons, served as a governor of the Alberta University of the Arts and Mount Royal University, vice-chair of the Calgary Police Commission and chair of the Calgary Public Library.
