= Michèle Audette =

Canadian politician and activist

The Honourable Michèle Audette
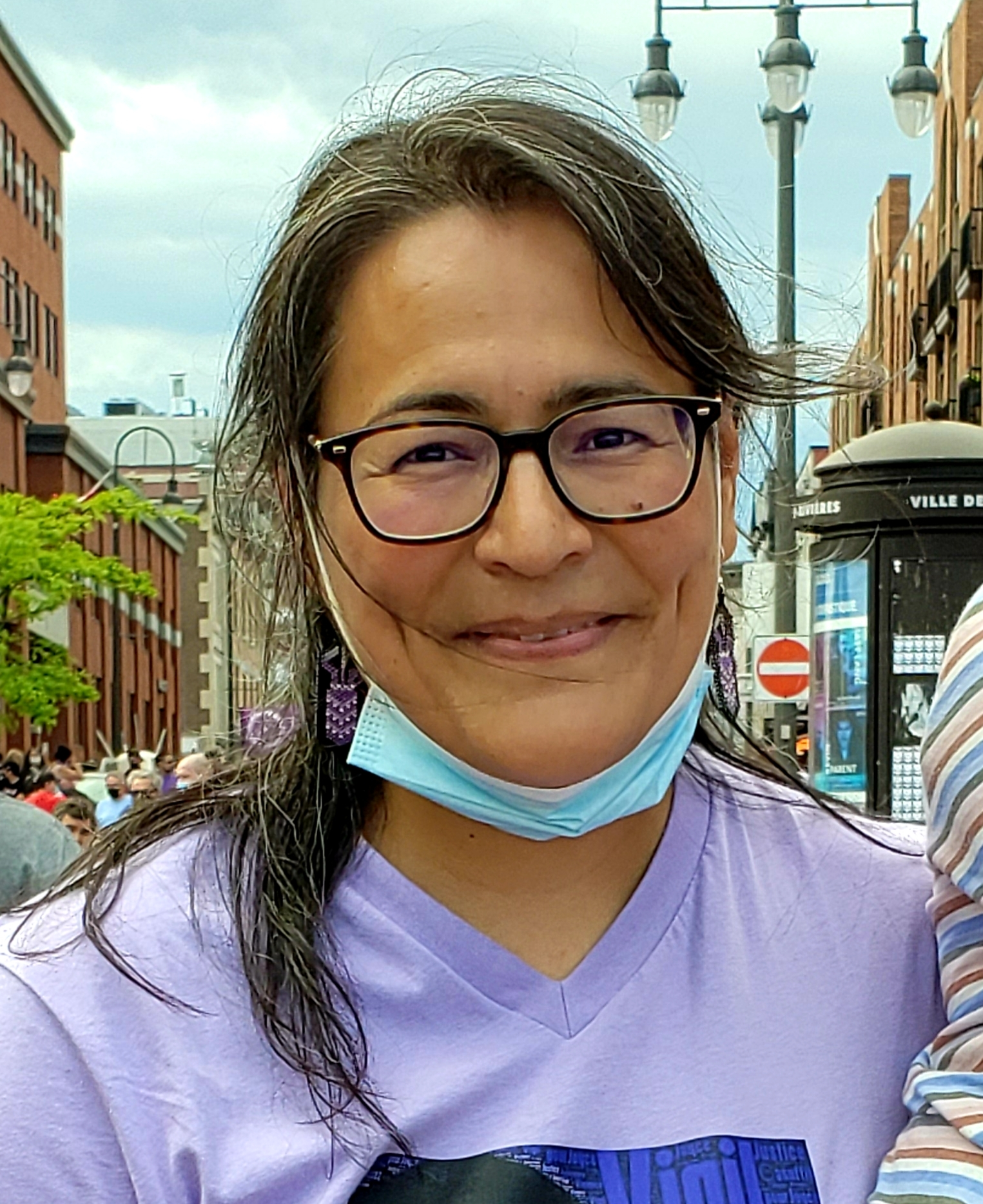
- Audette in 2021

Canadian Senator from De Salaberry
- Incumbent
- Assumed office July 29, 2021
- Nominated by: Justin Trudeau
- Appointed by: Mary Simon

Government Liaison in the Senate
- In office August 9, 2023 – December 26, 2023
- Leader: Marc Gold
- Preceded by: Patti LaBoucane-Benson
- Succeeded by: Frances Lankin

Personal details
- Born: Michèle Taïna Audette; July 20, 1971 (age 55) Wabush, Newfoundland and Labrador, Canada
- Party: Non-affiliated (2021; since 2023)
- Other political affiliations: Independent Senators Group (2021-2022); Progressive Senate Group (2022-2023)
- Occupation: Politician; activist
- Known for: President of the Native Women's Association of Canada

Michèle Taïna Audette (born July 20, 1971) is a Canadian Innu politician and activist. She served as president of Femmes autochtones du Québec (Quebec Native Women) from 1998 to 2004 and again from 2010 to 2012. She was also the president of the Native Women's Association of Canada from 2012 to 2014. From 2004 through 2008, she served as associate deputy minister at the Quebec Secrétariat à la condition féminine.

In 2017, she was appointed as one of the five commissioners of the government's national inquiry into Missing and Murdered Indigenous Women and Girls. In 2021, Prime Minister Justin Trudeau nominated her to the Canadian Senate, as a Senator for Quebec.

== Life ==
In 1971, Audette's mother was returning to Schefferville from Sept-Îles by train when she unexpectedly went into labour. The train stopped and her mother was airlifted by helicopter to the nearest hospital, in Wabush, Labrador, where Audette was born. She grew up in Schefferville, Maliotenam, and Montreal. Audette is from the Innu community of Uashat mak Mani-Utenam in Quebec. Her mother, Evelyne St-Onge, is Innu and her father, Gilles Audette, is French-Canadian from Montreal. The family was denied a house on her mother's reserve under federal law because her mother married a non-Native man. St-Onge co-founded Femmes autochtones du Québec (FAQ) in 1974, which fought against the clause in the federal Indian Act that stated that a Native woman who marries a non-Native man did not have the right to live in her reserve community. Native men who marry non-Native women did not have such restrictions.

As Audette grew up, she too became an activist in Indigenous affairs. She served as president of FAQ from 1998 to 2004, and from 2010 to 2012, then led the Native Women's Association of Canada (NWAC) from 2012 to 2014, the youngest woman to be elected. She also acted in a Heritage Minute as a member of an Atikamekw family teaching early French settlers how to make maple syrup.

Audette was appointed as associate deputy minister at the Quebec Secrétariat à la condition féminine, serving from 2004 through 2008. She has worked as a researcher for Aboriginal Nations, a news magazine broadcast on Télé-Québec.

In 2017, Audette was appointed as one of five commissioners to the national inquiry on Missing and Murdered Indigenous Women and Girls to raise awareness and gain government action on the issue in Canada. The inquiry, which had an estimated cost of $53.8 million, examined the factors and institutions that contribute to a high rate of violence against Indigenous women and girls. Their final report, delivered to the federal government in 2019, included 231 calls for justice.

In May 2021 she appeared on Ici Radio-Canada Première's literary debate show Le Combat des livres, advocating for Michel Jean's novel Kukum. The novel won the competition.

=== Politics ===
In the 2015 Canadian federal election, Audette ran as the Liberal candidate for the Quebec riding of Terrebonne and was defeated by Bloc Québécois candidate Michel Boudrias.

In July 2021, she was appointed a senator for Quebec. Initially non-affiliated, she joined the Independent Senators Group on September 27, 2021. On June 27, 2022, she joined the Progressive Senate Group.

On August 9, 2023, she was appointed Government Liaison by Representative of the Government in the Senate Marc Gold. The role entails acting as a whip to secure votes for government legislation in the Senate. She subsequently left the Progressive Senate Group and became once again non-affiliated.

== Personal life ==
Audette, a mother of five, lives in both Wendake near Quebec City and the Innu reserve of Maliotenam near Sept-Îles, Quebec, with her domestic partner Serge Ashini Goupil. She is a consultant with the Indigenous rights group Nation Innue.

== Awards ==
- Queen Elizabeth II Diamond Jubilee Medal (2012)
- Woman of the Year from the Montreal Council of Women (2014)
- Woman of Distinction Award in the Inspiration category from the Women’s Y Foundation of Montréal (2018)

== Electoral record ==
2015 Canadian federal election: Terrebonne
Party	Candidate	Votes	%	±%	Expenditures
Bloc Québécois	Michel Boudrias	19,238	33.01	+2.23	$17,316.45
Liberal	Michèle Audette	16,316	27.99	+21.07	$28,471.60
New Democratic	Charmaine Borg	14,928	25.61	-25.93	$66,226.31
Conservative	Michel Surprenant	6,615	11.35	+3.28	$4,734.68
Green	Susan Moen	1,016	1.74	-0.95	–
Strength in Democracy	Louis Clément Sénat	171	0.29	–	$1,208.41
Total valid votes/expense limit		58,284	97.89		$222,232.39
Total rejected ballots		1,256	2.11	–	
Turnout		59,540	70.46	–	
Eligible voters		84,502			
Bloc Québécois gain from New Democratic		Swing		+14.08	
Source: Elections Canada

== See also ==
- Missing and Murdered Indigenous Women
