= Marty Klyne =

Canadian politician and corporate executive

The Honourable Marty Klyne

Canadian Senator for Saskatchewan
- Incumbent
- Assumed office September 24, 2018
- Nominated by: Justin Trudeau
- Appointed by: Julie Payette
- Preceded by: Pana Merchant

Personal details
- Born: March 6, 1957 (age 69) Regina, Saskatchewan, Canada
- Party: Progressive Senate Group
- Spouse: Charlene Klyne
- Children: 2

Martin Klyne (born March 6, 1957) is a Canadian senator and former corporate executive. Klyne was appointed to the Senate of Canada in September 2018. He is a Cree Métis citizen. After obtaining his degree from the University of Regina ('86) in business administration with a major in finance, he quickly became a manager with the Mercantile Bank of Canada, currently known as Toronto-Dominion Bank, and continued his career from there.

== Education ==
Klyne graduated from the University of Regina with distinction with a degree in business administration, majoring in finance in 1986.

== Career ==
=== RCMP Heritage Centre ===
Klyne served as the chief executive officer for the centre from March 2017-August 2018. Klyne focused on the further development of the centre to continue the legacy of the Royal Canadian Mounted Police.

=== Queen City Sports and Entertainment Group ===
From May 2015-January 2017, Klyne was the chief operating officer for the Regina Pats Hockey Club, where he focused on the operations of the organization with the president of the hockey club, while working with John Paddock, the general manager of hockey operations.

=== First Nations University of Canada ===
Klyne was an instructor and sessional lecturer for the university from January 2013-May 2015. He taught many courses, ADMN 406 and ADMN 100.

=== Regina Leader-Post and The StarPhoenix ===
During his term, Klyne managed the operations of two major newspapers in Saskatchewan. He also built one of the best operating performances for Canadian newspaper markets when compared to larger newspaper markets across Canada.
