= Wanda Thomas Bernard =

Canadian senator

The Honourable Wanda Thomas Bernard CM ONS

Canadian Senator from Nova Scotia
- Incumbent
- Assumed office November 10, 2016
- Nominated by: Justin Trudeau
- Appointed by: David Johnston

Personal details
- Born: August 1, 1953 (age 72) Halifax, Nova Scotia, Canada
- Party: Progressive Senate Group
- Occupation: Social worker; academic

Wanda Thomas Bernard CM ONS (born August 1, 1953) is a Canadian senator.

== Career ==
She was formerly a social worker and educator from East Preston, Nova Scotia. Bernard is the first Black Canadian to have an academic tenure position and become a full professor at Dalhousie University, where her research focuses on anti-oppression and diversity. Bernard was one of the founding members of the Association of Black Social Workers.

== As a Senator ==
On October 27, 2016, Bernard was named to the Senate of Canada by Prime Minister Justin Trudeau to sit as an independent. At the time of her appointment, she was the chair of the Nova Scotia Advisory Council on the Status of Women. She is the first African Nova Scotian woman to serve in the Senate Chamber.

Bernard supports official recognition of Emancipation Day in Canada, and proposed a 2018 private member's bill to that effect.

Bernard joined the Progressive Senate Group on July 8, 2020.

== Accolades and nominations ==
In 2005, she was appointed to the Order of Canada for her work addressing racism and diversity in the field of social work, and in 2014, she was awarded the Order of Nova Scotia. In 2021, Bernard was awarded an honorary Doctor of Laws from Carleton University.
