= Karen Sorensen =

Canadian politician

The Honourable Karen Sorensen

Canadian Senator from Alberta
- Incumbent
- Assumed office July 29, 2021
- Nominated by: Justin Trudeau
- Appointed by: Mary Simon
- Preceded by: Grant Mitchell

Mayor of Banff
- In office 2010 – July 29, 2021
- Preceded by: John Stutz
- Succeeded by: Corrie DiManno

Banff Town Councillor
- In office 2004–2010

Personal details
- Born: May 20, 1959 (age 67) Orangeville, Ontario, Canada
- Party: Progressive Senate Group (since 2026)
- Other political affiliations: Independent Senators Group (2021-2026)
- Education: University of Guelph

Karen Sorensen (born May 20, 1959) is a Canadian politician. Since July 2021, she has served in the Senate of Canada, representing the province of Alberta. She previously served as the mayor of Banff, Alberta, for three terms, beginning in 2010.

== Early life and career ==
Sorensen was born in Orangeville, Ontario.

Professionally, she was a hotelier for 17 years before founding Catalyst Enterprises Consulting in 2000, which provides training for the hospitality industry. She is a graduate of the University of Guelph, where she earned a bachelor's degree in geography. Prior to becoming mayor, Sorensen was a municipal councillor for six years, from 2004 to 2010, and she was a school trustee for four.

== Senate ==
On July 29, 2021, she was summoned to the Senate of Canada by Governor General Mary Simon, on the advice of Prime Minister Justin Trudeau. She had previously, in 2019, applied online to be a senator, which was sent to Huguette Labelle, who headed the advisory board regarding senate appointments. Upon her appointment in 2021, she joined the Independent Senators Group. She currently serves as co-chair of the Parliamentary Tourism Caucus and is also on the standing committees on Agriculture and Forestry and Indigenous Peoples.

On March 18, 2026, Sorensen changed her affiliation from the Independent Senators Group to the Progressive Senate Group.
