= Peter Harder (politician) =

Canadian politician (born 1952)

The Honourable Peter Harder PC

Representative of the Government in the Senate
- In office March 23, 2016 – December 31, 2019
- Preceded by: Claude Carignan (as Leader of the Government in the Senate)
- Succeeded by: Marc Gold

Canadian Senator from Ontario
- Incumbent
- Assumed office March 23, 2016
- Nominated by: Justin Trudeau
- Appointed by: David Johnston
- Constituency: Ottawa

Personal details
- Born: August 25, 1952 (age 74) Winnipeg, Manitoba, Canada
- Party: Progressive Senate Group (since 2020)

V. Peter Harder PC (born August 25, 1952) is a Canadian senator and a former senior civil servant in the Government of Canada. He was the nominated by Prime Minister Justin Trudeau on March 18, 2016 and was the first Trudeau-appointed senator to take office. He was the inaugural office holder of the role of Representative of the Government in the Senate, representing the Trudeau government in the Senate during Trudeau's first term as Prime Minister from 2016 to 2019. He is currently a member of the Progressive Senate Group.

== Early life ==
Harder was from the small community of Vineland in the Town of Lincoln in Ontario's Niagara Region. He studied political science at the University of Waterloo, and was a member of the Mennonite Conrad Grebel College, where he served as student council president. After working as a parliamentary intern, he completed graduate studies at Queen’s University.

== Career ==
=== Early political training ===
Harder started his career in government in 1977 as a foreign service officer. He took a job as an assistant in the minister's office of Flora MacDonald during the brief Joe Clark Progressive Conservative government, and joined Clark's opposition leader's office as chief of staff following the government's defeat. When the Conservatives returned to power under Brian Mulroney, Harder appointed chief of staff to Deputy Prime Minister Erik Nielsen. He left government for a brief stint as chief of staff to the CEO at CN Railways, and returned in 1987 to be the founding executive director at the Immigration and Refugee Board.

=== Civil service head of five departments ===
Harder received his first appointment at the civil servant's top rank in 1991 when he was appointed associate deputy minister for immigration, when immigration was part of the Department of Employment and Immigration. He was appointed full deputy minister to Solicitor General Doug Lewis in early 1993 and became the only holder of title Deputy Minister of Public Security during the department's brief appearance with that name in the Campbell ministry. The Chretien Liberals formed government later that year and completed a major restructuring of the government, in which Harder was tasked with the establishment of the new Citizenship and Immigration Canada as its first deputy minister.

Harder headed the civil service in three more departments:

- Treasury Board Secretariat from 1995 to 2000 (as Secretary of the Treasury Board and Comptroller General for Canada)
- Industry Canada from 2000 to 2003
- Department of Foreign Affairs and International Trade (DFAIT) from 2003 to 2007 (as Deputy Minister of Foreign Affairs, the ranking deputy minister of the department);

He also served as Prime Minister Martin's and Harper's personal representative (sherpa) for the 2004, 2005, and 2006 G8 summits.

He was reportedly a contender for the top civil service job of the Clerk of the Privy Council, twice during Jean Chretien's premiership and again at the beginning of Stephan Harper's premiership.

He retired from the federal public service in January 2007 at age 54.

=== Private sector ===
Following his retirement from the federal public service, he became a policy advisor the multi-national law firm Dentons. From 2009 to 2016, he served as the President of the Canada China Business Council, an organization founded by the Power Corp's Desmarais family, before his appointment as a senator.

Upon the Liberals' 2015 election victory, Harder was tapped to lead Justin Trudeau's transition team.

== Senate of Canada ==
=== Partisan advocate for new non-partisan arrangement ===
Harder was among Trudeau's this first batch of senate nominations announced in March 2016. The seven nomination were the earliest senators appointments based on the recommendations of the Independent Advisory Board for Senate Appointments. Harder was sworn into office on March 23, a week ahead of the other six new senators in the same announcement, making him the first senator of the notionally non-partisan era.

In the same announcement of Harder's appointment to the upper house, Trudeau also named him the inaugural Representative of the Government in the Senate, a new role to discharge the functions formerly associated with the cabinet position Leader of the Government in the Senate. While the new role does not come with a seat in the cabinet, Harder was sworn of the Privy Council on April 6, 2016.

With all Liberal senators expelled by Trudeau a few years earlier, there was no longer a government caucus for Harder to marshal in support of the government's legislative initiatives. The following month, Harder recruited Conservative Senator Diane Bellemare, a former economic policy adviser and electoral candidate of the defunct Action Démocratique du Québec, as deputy government representative and Senator Grant Mitchell, a senator appointed by Paul Martin with extensive reach in the Liberal Party and a reputation as a partisan organizer, as the Government Liaison. Harder portrayed those roles as "technically" the deputy government leader and government chief whip in the senate.

As the first government senate leader without a government caucus to lead, Harder and his small Government Representative Office team had the unenviable task of marshalling government business without troops to marshal, building while test-driving a new arrangement for the exercise of government's legislative power within an institution deeply rooted in partisan Westminster traditions. Given vast majority of the Senators were partisan appointees of previous governments, his team's debut in the Senate was subjected to fire from both sides of the Senate aisle.

As government representative, Harder was a vocal champion for Trudeau's push to reconstitute the chamber along non-partisan lines. He authored a number of articles aggressively asserting the legitimacy of the new senate arrangement, taking pains to promoting the virtue of senators' freedom from of the party whips of the old, while imploring senators for their corporation in the name of efficiency.

Harder's hands as the government's representative was strengthened quickly as Trudeau rapidly filled the more than 20 pre-existing senate vacancies with independent senators who entered the chamber with the expectation of working in the new arrangement. The government still faces push back on some of its key initiatives however. In the final weeks of sittings of the 42nd Parliament, the government's Oil Tanker Moratorium Act came within three votes of being defeated in the senate, while the Impact Assessment Act and Canadian Energy Regulator Act endured many amendments that the government deemed unacceptable.

Following the Liberals re-election in 2019 federal election with a reduced minority mandate, the Prime Minister's office announced in late November that Harder and Mitchell would be relinquishing their roles representing the government in the senate at the end of 2019. (Bellemare had already relinquished her role by that point and joined the Independent Senator Group.) Harder was succeeded by constitutional law scholar the Senator Marc Gold.

=== Concerns with majoritarianism ===
On May 14, 2020, Harder joined the Progressive Senate Group, a group composed largely of former Liberal senators at the time. Explaining his move, Harder said he was concerned that partisanship in the Senate had been replaced by "majoritarianism" as the Independent Senators Group became the largest caucus, and wanted to be "part of a bulwark against that."

He was chair of the Canadian Senate Standing Committee on Rules, Procedures and the Rights of Parliament and deputy chair of the Canadian Senate Standing Committee on Foreign Affairs and International Trade in the 45th Canadian Parliament.

Harder faces mandatory retirement from the Senate in 2027.

== Awards ==
Year	Award	Notes
2000	Prime Minister's Outstanding Achievement Award	
2002	Queen Elizabeth II Golden Jubilee Medal	
2012	Queen Elizabeth II Diamond Jubilee Medal	
