= Suze Youance =

Canadian engineer and senator

The Honourable Suze Youance

Senator for Lauzon, Quebec
- Incumbent
- Assumed office September 25, 2024
- Nominated by: Justin Trudeau
- Appointed by: Mary Simon
- Preceded by: Dennis Dawson

Personal details
- Born: August 11, 1970 (age 56) Port-au-Prince, Haiti
- Party: Independent Senators Group
- Profession: Civil engineer

Suze Youance (born August 11, 1970) is a Canadian civil engineer, lecturer, researcher, and broadcaster. She was appointed to the Senate of Canada on September 25, 2024. She was nominated by the Independent Advisory Board for Senate Appointments and appointed by Governor General of Canada Mary Simon on the recommendation of Prime Minister Justin Trudeau.

== Early life and education ==
Youance was born in Port-au-Prince, Haiti. She earned her bachelor's degree in civil engineering from the Faculty of Sciences at the State University of Haiti (UEH). She moved to Canada in 2006 to pursue her master's degree at École de Technologie Supérieure after spending more than a decade working on Canadian aid projects in Port-au-Prince. She also holds a PhD in construction engineering from ETS.

== Career ==
Based in Montreal, she has since 2008 been a lecturer and researcher at the École de technologie supérieure (ETS), a public research university affiliated with the Université du Québec and that specializes in engineering. At the time of her appointment to the Senate she was also chair of the board of directors of the Bureau de la communauté haïtienne (Haitian Community Office) in Montreal. Until 2003, Youance hosted two programs on sustainable development and engineering on Savoir Média, an educational television channel in Quebec.

She served as a project officer at the Montréal-based engineering firm FNX-INNOV.

She is also a member of the board of directors of the Société d’habitation et de développement de Montréal and a member of the board of directors of Mains utiles which provides services to Haitian women in Montreal.

In 2006, Youance was awarded the Casimir Gzowski Gold Medal from the Canadian Society for Civil Engineering for her work on the effect of earthquakes on hospital buildings. She is also a recipient of the Mathieu Da Costa Award from the Black Coalition of Quebec.
