= Salma Ataullahjan =

Canadian politician

The Honourable Salma Ataullahjan
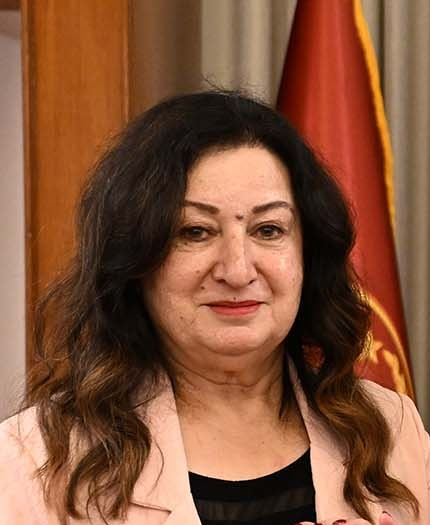

Canadian Senator from Ontario
- Incumbent
- Assumed office July 9, 2010
- Nominated by: Stephen Harper
- Appointed by: Michaëlle Jean

Personal details
- Born: April 29, 1952 (age 74) Mardan, Pakistan
- Party: Conservative
- Spouse: Saleem Ataullahjan
- Occupation: Activist; realtor

Salma Ataullahjan (Pashto: سلما عطااللہ جان) (born April 29, 1952) is a politician, real estate agent, and activist. She was appointed to the Senate of Canada on the advice of Prime Minister Stephen Harper, on July 9, 2010, and sits with the Conservative caucus. She had been the Conservative Party's unsuccessful candidate in Mississauga—Brampton South during the 2008 federal election losing to Liberal MP Navdeep Bains.

== Background ==
Ataullahjan is an advocate for the Pakistani community; she has served on the executive board of the Canadian branch of The Citizens Foundation, an international organization that since 1995 has built 730 schools for Pakistan’s poorest children and is an executive member of the Canadian Pashtun Cultural Association. She immigrated to Canada in 1980 from Pakistan as a new bride. Prior to her appointment to the Senate she worked in the Toronto area as a realtor. She has a diploma in computer operations and is also an artist. She stated her political heroes were Khan Abdul Ghaffar Khan, Emily Stowe and Terry Fox.

She founded the parents council at David Lewis Public School in Toronto and has also served as the executive of the Pakistani Canadian Professionals and Academics and as president and vice-president of the Canadian Pashtun Cultural Association. She is also on the executive of the South Asian Regional Council and Citizens Foundation's Toronto chapter.

== Family ==
Ataullahjan was born in Mardan, Khyber Pakhtunkhwa, Pakistan into a Pashtun family. Her great-great-uncle Bacha Khan, led a non-violent Khudai Khidmatgar Muslim movement for Indian independence from British rule. Her father is Saranjam Khan, a former Pakistani senator and until recently secretary-general of Nawaz Sharif's Pakistan Muslim League (N) party. As a schoolgirl, she was friends with Benazir Bhutto.

Ataullahjan holds Dual-citizenship with Pakistan.

== See also ==
- Pakistani Canadian
