= Judy White =

Canadian politician and lawyer

The Honourable Judy White KC

Canadian Senator from Newfoundland and Labrador
- Incumbent
- Assumed office July 6, 2023
- Nominated by: Justin Trudeau
- Appointed by: Mary Simon
- Preceded by: George Furey

Personal details
- Born: January 11, 1964 (age 62)
- Party: Progressive Senate Group
- Education: Dalhousie University

Judy White KC (born January 11, 1964) is a Canadian politician and lawyer who has served as a senator from Newfoundland and Labrador since July 2023.

== Background ==
White is a member of the Flat Bay Band and holds a Bachelor of Laws Degree from Dalhousie University with a particular emphasis on Indigenous law and has completed several Indigenous law certificate programs.

== Career ==
White previously served in several senior positions including Assistant Deputy Minister of Indigenous Affairs and Reconciliation in the Government of Newfoundland and Labrador and as Chief Executive Officer for the Assembly of First Nations. She was appointed a Queen's Counsel (now King's Counsel) in January 2018.

On July 6, 2023, she was summoned to the Senate of Canada by Governor General Mary Simon, on the advice of Prime Minister Justin Trudeau.

== Honours ==
In 2022, she received the Governor General's Award in Commemoration of the Persons Case in recognition of her outstanding contributions to the advancement of gender equality. She is also the 2023 recipient of the Gordon M. Stirling Distinguished Service Award from the Law Society of Newfoundland and Labrador.
