= Réjean Aucoin =

Canadian politician

The Honourable Réjean Aucoin

Canadian Senator from Nova Scotia
- Incumbent
- Assumed office October 31, 2023
- Nominated by: Justin Trudeau
- Appointed by: Mary Simon

Personal details
- Born: July 4, 1955 (age 71) Chéticamp, Nova Scotia, Canada
- Party: Canadian Senators Group
- Education: Université de Moncton

Albert Réjean Aucoin (born July 4, 1955) is a Canadian politician who has served as a senator from Nova Scotia since October 2023.

== Early life and education ==
Aucoin was born and raised in Chéticamp, Nova Scotia. He graduated from Université de Moncton with a Bachelor in Social Work in 1977 and with a Bachelor of Laws in 1991.

== Career ==
Aucoin practised law privately from 1993 until his appointment to the Senate of Canada.

On October 31, 2023, he was summoned to the Senate of Canada by Governor General Mary Simon, on the advice of prime minister Justin Trudeau.
