= Official party status =

Canadian political practice

Official party status is a Canadian political jargon denoting political parties represented in the Parliament of Canada or provincial legislatures that are formally recognized as parliamentary caucuses. Such recognition usually comes with entitlement to a share of speaking time, allocation of committee membership, and funding for a caucus office. In parliamentary documents, this is sometimes referred to as being a recognized party (French: parti reconnu). It is analogous to opposition parties entitled to Short Money in the House of Commons of the United Kingdom or minority parties in the Parliament of Australia.

== Current status ==
Parties with official party status in their respective legislatures and their respective seat counts, as of November 2026:

Assembly (seats)		Government	Official Opposition	Parties With Status	Parties Without Status	Most recent GE
House of Commons	343	Liberal 173	Conservative 137	Bloc Québécois 21	New Democratic 5	April 28, 2025
House of Commons	343	Liberal 173	Conservative 137	Bloc Québécois 21	Green 1	April 28, 2025
Senate	105	Government Rep. 5	Conservative 13	Independent S.G. 37		April 28, 2025
Senate	105	Government Rep. 5	Conservative 13	Progressive S.G. 17		April 28, 2025
Senate	105	Government Rep. 5	Conservative 13	Canadian S.G. 15		April 28, 2025
Newfoundland and Labrador	40	Prog. Conservative 20	Liberal 15	New Democratic 2		October 14, 2025
Prince Edward Island	27	Prog. Conservative 18	Liberal 4	Green 4		April 3, 2023
Nova Scotia	56	Prog. Conservative 43	New Democratic 9	Liberal 3		November 26, 2024
New Brunswick	49	Liberal 31	Prog. Conservative 16	Green 2		October 21, 2024
Quebec	127	Parti Québécois 59	Liberal 40	Conservative 19	Québec solidaire 9	October 5, 2026
Ontario	124	Prog. Conservative 79	New Democratic 27	Liberal 14	Green 2	February 27, 2025
Manitoba	57	New Democratic 34	Prog. Conservative 19		Liberal 1	October 3, 2023
Saskatchewan	61	Saskatchewan 34	New Democratic 27			October 28, 2024
Alberta	87	United Conservative 46	New Democratic 39		Progressive Tory 1	May 29, 2023
British Columbia	93	Conservative 64	New Democratic 27	Green 2		October 24, 2026
Yukon	21	Yukon Party 14	New Democratic 6	Liberal 1		November 14, 2023

== History ==
Traditionally in Westminster-style parliaments, the only non-governmental member other than the speaker with a recognized status is the Leader of the Opposition. This would be the member who had the widest support among opposition MPs, who would take the lead in questioning the government during parliamentary debates, and who would traditionally be called upon by the Monarch or Governor General to attempt to form a government if the previous government lost the confidence of the House. As political parties became more formalized in the 20th century, some Westminster parliaments (particularly in Canada, but also elsewhere) began to recognize opposition political party caucuses as having a distinct role, where they would have their own opportunities to ask questions during parliamentary debates and have their own organizational budgets and offices within the parliament buildings.

Recognition in Parliament allows party caucuses certain parliamentary privileges. Generally official party status depends on winning a minimum number of seats (that is, the number of Members of Parliament or Members of the Legislative Assembly elected). The type of recognition and threshold needed to obtain it varies. However, the most coveted privileges are funding for party research offices and the right to ask questions during Question Period.

At the federal level in Canada, the idea of recognizing parties for official status started in 1963. Prior to this, the only opposition recognition was that of the Leader of the Opposition, effectively limiting "official status" to the Government and the largest Opposition party. It was not until 1970 that the Elections Act was amended to allow parties to register and thus have their party name on the ballot.

Most of the rules governing official party status are not laws, but are internal rules governing the legislatures. This is rooted in the principal of parliament being master of its own procedures. Therefore, the members of a legislature may, if they choose, pass a motion to dispense with the rules and grant official status to parties that would otherwise fail to qualify. There are many examples of this practice in multiple jurisdiction. In some instances, governing parties did this to prop up smaller parties in order to weaken their principal rivals.

== Requirements for official party status ==
Sometimes, the requirements for official party status are set out either in a law or in the parliament's Rules of Procedure. These rules may usually be changed or waived by a vote of the House (for instance, to allow some or all official party privileges to a party that does not meet the minimum requirements set out in the Rules).

Minimum seats required for official party status
Assembly	Minimum seats	Additional requirements, alternative criteria and notes
Canada – House of Commons	12 seats	
Canada – Senate	9 seats	
Alberta Legislative Assembly	4 seats	Status has been granted to parties with only 2 seats a number of times.
British Columbia Legislative Assembly	2 seats	
Manitoba Legislative Assembly	4 seats	
New Brunswick Legislative Assembly	5 seats	Alternative criteria: 20% of the popular vote
Newfoundland and Labrador; House of Assembly	3 seats	Additional requirement: fielded candidates in at least two-thirds of electoral districts (27 out of 40); Minimum applicable to number of members elected (not number of seats held), thus status not affected by mid-term floor-crossing or resignations
Nova Scotia House of Assembly	2 seats	Additional requirement: fielded candidates in at least three-quarters of the electoral districts (42 out of 55) and received at least 10% of the popular vote The official opposition not subject to additional requirements
Ontario Legislative Assembly	12 seats	10% of seats in legislature, rounded to nearest whole number
Prince Edward Island Legislative Assembly	1 seat	No formal rule, but precedent shows that only one seat is required.
Quebec National Assembly	12 seats	Alternative criteria: 20% of the popular vote
Saskatchewan Legislative Assembly	2 seats	
Yukon Legislative Assembly	1 seat	Additional requirement: fielded candidates in at least two electoral districts

== Special cases ==
=== House of Commons ===
Under the Canadian War Service Voting Regulations, 1944, membership standings in the House of Commons of eight or more were used to qualify leaders to appoint scrutineers for the special returning offices.

Since the early 1950s, parties other than the government and official opposition had been granted limited rights by a series of rulings in the House of Commons. Following an amendment to the Senate and House of Commons Act in 1963, the leaders of parties with twelve or more recognized members in the House of Commons began to be paid an additional stipend above that paid to all members of the House of Commons. Such recognized parties have also received research funding since 1968.

In 2001, the Speaker, Peter Milliken, ruled against full party recognition for the Progressive Conservative/Democratic Representative (PC/DR) Coalition, which had been formed by the 12 members of the recognized PC Party and 8 independent members of the Democratic Representative Caucus, who had left the larger Canadian Alliance caucus. Milliken identified the features of a recognized party as having 12 or more members, appointing slate of House officers as official spokespeople, and working as a cohesive unit under the same banner but noted the practice related to the recognition of parties rather than parliamentary groups. The Speaker could not grant the PC/DR Coalition full party recognition because the group disavowed the title of being a party.

A party must have at least 12 seats to be recognized as an official party in the House of Commons. Recognition means that the party's caucus is permitted to ask questions during question period more frequently (although this is determined by the Speaker), and money for research (proportional to the number of seats).

=== Senate ===
In the Senate, a group must have nine seats to be recognized. If the group was registered by Elections Canada in the last 15 years, it is called a recognized party. Otherwise, it is called a recognized parliamentary group, as is the case of the Independent Senators Group, which has been granted some privileges like those of a party.

Prior to 2017, when the Senate adopted a rules amendments to recognize parliamentary groups not affiliated with a political party, the Senate used political party recognition rules first adopted in 2002. The 2002 rules defined a recognized party as having five or more members in the Senate and required that the party be registered by Election Canada at the time of initial recognition. However, once the party was recognized in the Senate, it could retain its status even if it became deregistered, so long as it kept at least five members. In response to a question in an earlier debate about third political party recognition, Jack Austin, at the time the chair of the Senate Rules Committee, stated that the number of five was chosen as a proportional equivalent to the House of Commons 12-member rule.

The second part of the 2002 rule meant that the rump Progressive Conservative caucus in the Senate would have been able to qualify for official status after the rest of that party merged into the Conservative Party except that the initial PC caucus in 2004 after the merger only had three members.

=== Alberta ===
In the general elections of 1997, 2001, and 2008, the Alberta New Democratic Party (NDP) failed to win the requisite four seats to gain official party status in the Legislative Assembly of Alberta. Nevertheless, the governing Progressive Conservatives (PCs) granted party status to the NDP after each election.

=== British Columbia ===
After the 2001 general election, new B.C. Premier Gordon Campbell, leader of the British Columbia Liberal Party, was criticized for his decision not to grant official party status to the NDP. It was the only opposition party in the Legislative Assembly of British Columbia but it had won only two of 79 seats in the last election.

Since the 2013 election, the Green Party of British Columbia has held their first seat as their then-leader Andrew Weaver was elected in Oak Bay-Gordon Head district. After the 2017 election, Weaver was re-elected and they gained two more seats, thus overall had three seats when the minimum for official party status was four. However, after the party entered a confidence and supply agreement with the New Democratic Party to allow the NDP to form government, it was granted official party status with reduced funding. The Legislative Assembly still recognized the Greens as an official party, after the agreement ended, retaining the threshold for official status at 2 seats.

=== New Brunswick ===
In New Brunswick, parties require 5 seats or 20% of the popular vote to get official party status. However, parties with one to four seats have been allowed time in Question Period with consent of other parties.

=== Ontario ===
Following the 1999 Ontario general election, the Ontario New Democratic Party fell to nine seats in the Ontario Legislative Assembly, down from 17 in 1995. The rules at the time of the election called for parties to hold 12 seats to maintain party status. Prog. Conservative Premier Mike Harris, citing the reduction in seats from 130 to 103 (-20.76%) between elections, subsequently lowered the required number of seats for official party status from 12 to 8 (33 1/3%). The mathematically corresponding cut would therefore have been from 12 seats to 9 seats (25%, slightly higher than the seat reduction) or 10 seats (16 2/3%, slightly lower). In the 2019 fall economic statement, Doug Ford's government changed the rules to 10% of the total number of seats in the Assembly, so it is currently set at 12.

In the 2003 election, the New Democrats won only seven seats in the Ontario Legislative Assembly. The new Liberal government refused to accord official party status to the NDP, with Premier Dalton McGuinty instead offering the NDP additional funding in return for accepting their status as independents; NDP leader Howard Hampton refused and disrupted the throne speech in protest. MPP Marilyn Churley threatened to change her surname legally to "Churley-NDP" so that the Speaker would be forced to say NDP when recognizing her in the House (a non-official party loses the right to have its members addressed in the Legislature by party affiliation). The PCs' Bill Murdoch also considered joining the NDP caucus to help them make official status. Andrea Horwath's by-election win in May 2004 regained official party status for the NDP.

After Churley resigned to run in the 2006 federal election, bringing the party to only seven members again, the government decided to allow the NDP to retain official status pending the results of the by-election to replace her, which the NDP won.

In the 2018 Ontario general election, the Liberals dropped from a majority government of 55 seats to 7 seats, one seat fewer than official party status. (The legislature expanded to 124 members in this election.) The Green Party of Ontario also elected its first member, leader Mike Schreiner, at Guelph, in 2018 and similarly lacks official party status.

=== Quebec ===
In 1989, the Equality Party won four seats in the National Assembly of Quebec (eight seats short of the total needed for official status). Although it did not receive official party status, its members were granted some of the privileges of an official party: their seats in the Assembly were placed together, as were their offices in the Parliament Building. They were also granted a limited number of opportunities to ask questions during Question Period, at the Speaker's discretion. The party had no success in subsequent elections, and stopped organizing after the 2003 election. This precedent was followed when the Action démocratique du Québec (ADQ) elected four members in 2003 and seven members in 2008. However, when ADQ merged into the newly formed Coalition Avenir Québec (CAQ) and the seven former ADQ MNAs joined with two former Parti Québécois (PQ) members in January 2012 to form the CAQ caucus, the governing Liberals and opposition PQ refused to grant any status to the new party, requiring all nine members to sit as independents.

In the 2018 Quebec general election, the PQ, which was the outgoing Official Opposition party, fell from 28 to 10 seats (and below 20% of the popular vote), thus falling below the threshold of official party status. Québec solidaire (QS) rose from 3 to 10 seats but did not reach the threshold of 12 to gain official party status. However, before the National Assembly convened, all political parties agreed to give the PQ and QS the status of official parties in the assembly.

== Registered party ==
Official party status is not to be confused with being a registered party. A political party (even if it has no parliamentary seats) may register with Elections Canada or a provincial electoral authority. Doing so allows the political party to run candidates for office during elections, have their candidates' party affiliation identified on the ballot, issue tax receipts for donations, and spend money on advertising and campaigning during election campaigns. In return, the party must obey campaign spending and donation limits, disclose the source of large donations, and obey various election laws.

== See also ==
- List of political parties in Canada
