= Kristopher Wells =

Canadian senator and academic (born 1971)

The Honourable Kristopher Wells
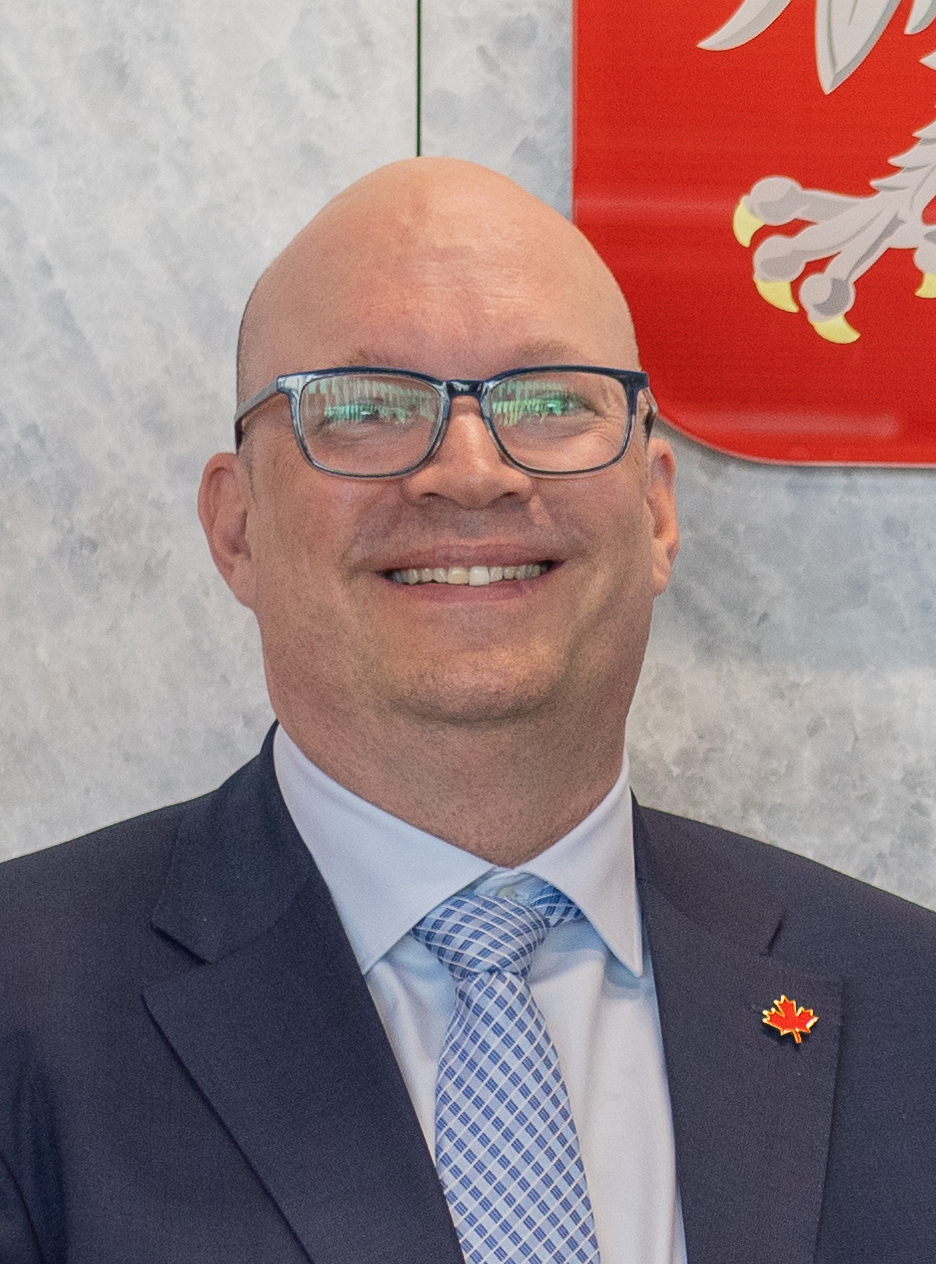

Canadian Senator from Alberta
- Incumbent
- Assumed office August 31, 2024
- Nominated by: Justin Trudeau
- Appointed by: Mary Simon

Personal details
- Born: October 7, 1971 (age 54)
- Party: Progressive Senate Group
- Other political affiliations: Non-affiliated (2024-2025)
- Education: University of Alberta (BEd, MEd, PhD)
- Profession: Academic

Kristopher Wells (born October 7, 1971) is a Canadian politician and academic. Since 2024, he has represented the province of Alberta in the Senate of Canada. He is also an associate professor at MacEwan University and the editor-in-chief of the international Journal of LGBT Youth.

== Education ==
Wells has earned three degrees from the University of Alberta: a Bachelor of Education, a Master of Education, and a Doctor of Philosophy.

== Academic career ==
Wells was a public school teacher in St. Albert, Alberta. He then worked as a diversity consultant for Edmonton Public Schools, where he helped develop the first sexual and gender identity school board policy in Western Canada.

From 2012 to 2018, he worked at the University of Alberta as an assistant professor and as the faculty director of the Institute for Sexual Minority Studies and Services. In 2018, he was appointed MacEwan University's first Canada Research Chair and was the founding director of the MacEwan Centre for Sexual and Gender Diversity. Wells has served on various committees in Alberta, including the Society for Safe and Caring Schools and Communities, REACH Edmonton, the Alberta Hate Crimes Committee, the Edmonton Police Chief's Community Advisory Council, and the LGBTQ2+ National Monument Committee. He has been a critic of the Alberta government's plan to require parental consent before children under 16 can change their names or preferred gender pronouns in schools.

Wells is the co-creator of pride tape, a campaign that encouraged NHL hockey players to use rainbow-patterned hockey tape on their sticks as a way of showing support for LGBT rights.

As of 2024, Wells is an associate professor in the Department of Child and Youth Care, part of the Faculty of Health and Community Studies at MacEwan University. He holds the Canada Research Chair (Tier II) for the Public Understanding of Sexual and Gender Minority Youth and serves as the founding director for the MacEwan Centre for Sexual and Gender Diversity. His academic work specializes in sexual- and gender-minority youth, education, and culture. He is the editor-in-chief of the international Journal of LGBT Youth.

== Political career ==
Wells was appointed to the Senate of Canada on August 31, 2024. He was recommended by the Independent Advisory Board for Senate Appointments and appointed by Governor General of Canada Mary Simon on the advice of Prime Minister Justin Trudeau.

The appointments of Wells and Daryl Fridhandler as senators from Alberta were criticized by Alberta Premier Danielle Smith for ignoring the results of the province's unofficial Senate nominee election.

== Honours ==
Wells is a recipient of the Alberta Centennial Medal, the Alberta Award for Study of Canadian Human Rights and Multiculturalism, the Alberta Teachers' Association's Public Education Award, and the Queen Elizabeth II Platinum Jubilee Medal. In 2015, Wells received the University of Alberta Alumni Horizon Award.
