= René Cormier =

Canadian politician

The Honourable René Cormier
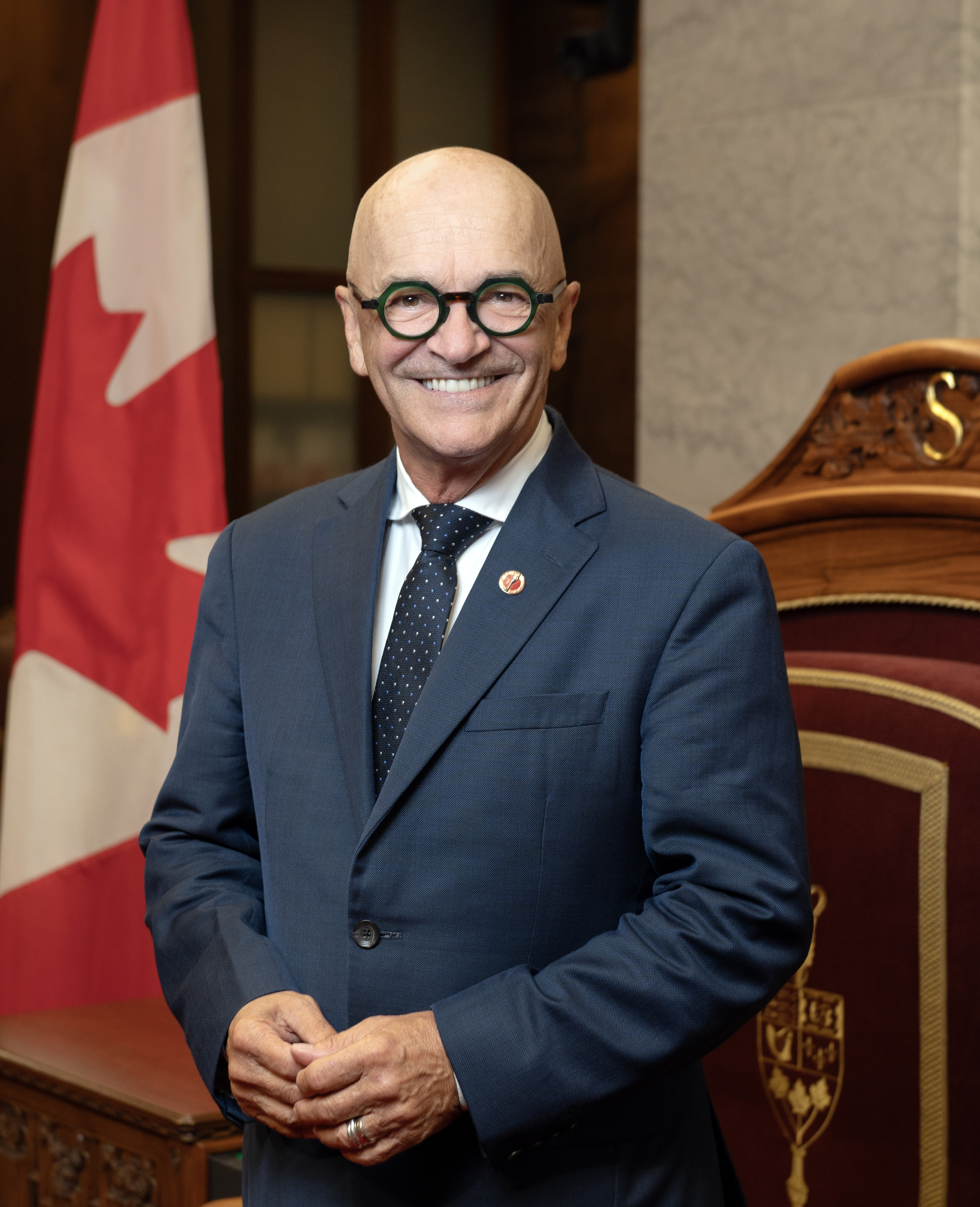

Canadian Senator from New Brunswick
- Incumbent
- Assumed office November 10, 2016
- Nominated by: Justin Trudeau
- Appointed by: David Johnston

Personal details
- Born: April 27, 1956 (age 70) Caraquet, New Brunswick
- Party: Independent Senators Group

René Cormier (born April 27, 1956) is a Canadian Acadian artist and activist from New Brunswick. He has been a senator from New Brunswick since 2016.

== Early life and education ==
Raised in Caraquet, New Brunswick, he studied music at the Université de Montréal. Following university, Cormier was a musical and theatre director.

== Political career ==
On October 27, 2016, Cormier was named to the Senate of Canada by Prime Minister Justin Trudeau to sit as an independent. Cormier assumed his seat on November 10, 2016.

A Francophone, he is president of the Société Nationale de l'Acadie (SNA), the primary organization championing Acadian artists. Following his appointment to the Senate, Cormier stated that he plans to continue with his work with the SNA, while avoiding any conflicts of interest. He formerly served as president for the Commission internationale du theatre francophone, director of the Théâtre populaire d'Acadie, president of the Fédération culturelle canadienne-française, and as a member of the board for the Canadian Conference of the Arts.

== Personal life ==
He is out as gay, and spearheaded the creation of the Canadian Pride Caucus, a non-partisan committee of Canada's LGBTQ MPs and senators.
