= Duncan Wilson (politician) =

Canadian senator from British Columbia

The Honourable Duncan Wilson

Senator for British Columbia
- Incumbent
- Assumed office 28 February 2025
- Nominated by: Justin Trudeau
- Appointed by: Mary Simon

Personal details
- Born: September 26, 1967 (age 58)
- Party: Progressive Senate Group
- Profession: Executive, Maritime sector
- Website: https://sencanada.ca/en/senators/wilson-duncan/

Duncan Wilson (born September 26, 1967) is a Canadian senator representing British Columbia in the Senate of Canada. He is a former maritime executive with extensive experience in environmental and external affairs. On 28 February 2025, he was appointed to the Senate of Canada representing British Columbia by Governor General Mary Simon on the advice of Prime Minister Justin Trudeau.

== Career ==
Wilson has over three decades of leadership experience spanning the maritime sector, government, and not-for-profit organizations. For 21 years, he worked at the Vancouver Fraser Port Authority, where he served as Vice-President of Environment and External Affairs. His work focused on marine conservation, climate action, and sustainable development. He also played a key role in Indigenous relations, negotiating agreements that advanced economic growth while protecting the environment.

Wilson also served three consecutive terms as a Vancouver Park Commissioner in the 1990s, becoming one of British Columbia’s first openly gay elected officials.

== Senate of Canada ==
Wilson was appointed to the Senate of Canada as an independent senator for British Columbia on 28 February 2025. His appointment followed a merit-based process introduced by Prime Minister Justin Trudeau in 2016 to ensure non-partisan Senate appointments. He joined the Progressive Senate Group on April 4, 2025.

== Political views ==
While Wilson has not publicly articulated specific political positions, his career reflects strong advocacy for environmental sustainability, Indigenous partnerships, and diversity and inclusion.

== Honours and recognition ==
Wilson’s contributions have been recognized with several honors:

- King Charles III Coronation Medal
- Queen Elizabeth II Diamond Jubilee Medal
- Ocean Wise Conservation Leadership Award (for corporate social responsibility in marine conservation)
- Lloyd’s List Americas Environmental Award (for excellence in environmental initiatives)
- Governance Professionals of Canada Sustainability Award (for leadership in corporate sustainability)

== Personal life ==
Wilson is one of British Columbia’s first openly gay elected officials and has been a longstanding advocate for LGBTQ2+ rights.
