= Progressive Senate Group =

Parliamentary group in the Senate of Canada

Progressive Senate Group Groupe progressiste du Sénat
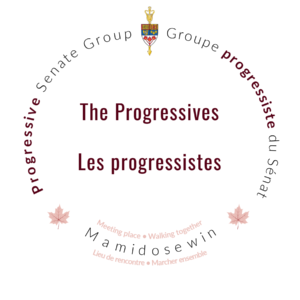
- Leader: Brian Francis
- Deputy Leader: Judy White
- Liaison: Amina Gerba
- Caucus Chair: Tracy Muggli
- Founded: November 14, 2019
- Preceded by: Senate Liberal Caucus
- Ideology: Progressivism; Non-partisan; Technical group
- Senate: 17 / 105

Website
- theprogressives.ca

The Progressive Senate Group (French: Groupe progressiste du Sénat) is a parliamentary group in the Senate of Canada. It was formed on November 14, 2019, out of the former Senate Liberal Caucus. It is currently led by Brian Francis.

== History ==
=== Background ===
On January 29, 2014, as part of his proposal for a non-partisan Senate, Liberal Party leader Justin Trudeau expelled all the Liberal senators from the parliamentary caucus. Despite being formally independent, the senators chose to continue sitting together as the Senate Liberal Caucus (SLC).

After the Liberal Party formed the government following the 2015 federal election, Trudeau appointed only independents to the Senate. By 2019, floor-crossings and retirements had reduced the SLC to nine members. As a minimum of nine members is required for official party status, which entitles a group to access to funding and other supports and privileges, the Senate Liberals were expected to lose their recognition as an official Senate caucus on January 24, 2020, when the mandatory retirement of Senator Joseph A. Day would reduce the caucus to eight.

=== Foundation ===
On November 14, 2019, Joseph Day announced that the SLC had been officially disbanded, with its current complement of nine members forming a new, non-partisan parliamentary group in the Progressive Senate Group, with the hope that the new group would be able to attract additional Senators. Day confirmed that, like Independent Senators Group and newly formed Canadian Senators Group, the PSG would not have whipped votes, and that the requirements of membership included supporting or holding progressive political values, support of the Canadian Charter of Rights and Freedoms, and supporting a new relationship with Indigenous peoples in Canada. Day, previously leader of the SLC, was named the PSG's interim leader, and Terry Mercer, previously the SLC chair, was confirmed as the PSG's deputy leader. Percy Downe was named as the interim whip/facilitator of the PSG.

=== As a caucus ===
On November 18, Downe left to join the Canadian Senators Group. As Downe's departure dropped the PSG's standings below the minimum nine members required to be recognized as a caucus, the PSG lost its official status and became ineligible for the privileges associated with being an official parliamentary group, such as $410,000 in annual funding for staff and research as well as its right to be represented on Senate committees and procedural rights on the Senate floor. Despite the loss of official recognition, Day said that the group would not disband, and that it hoped to recruit additional members.

With Day's mandatory retirement forthcoming in January 2020, on December 12, 2019, Jane Cordy tweeted that her colleagues in the PSG had selected her as the new leader, ostensibly effective that same date. Additionally, it was announced later that day that Mercer would be moving into the whip/caucus chair role, and that Dennis Dawson would become deputy leader. Serge Joyal's retirement followed on February 24, 2020, further reducing the PSG to six members.

On May 8, 2020, Patricia Bovey joined the caucus. Bovey, a Trudeau appointee and former member of the ISG, was the first member of the PSG to not be a former Liberal senator. A week later, on May 14, former Representative of the Government in the Senate Peter Harder joined the caucus. Harder, previously non-affiliated, explained that he was concerned about "majoritarianism" in the Senate and believed that, as part of the PSG, he could be "part of a bulwark against that." On May 21, 2020, Pierre Dalphond joined the caucus, bringing their numbers to nine and thus restoring official party status to the group.

On June 11, 2020, Bovey was named the PSG's liaison.

== Leadership ==
- Brian Francis - Leader (May 15, 2025 – present)
- Judy White - Deputy Leader (February 27, 2024 – present)
- Amina Gerba - Liaison (May 15, 2025 – present)
- Tracy Muggli - Caucus Chair (May 15, 2025 – present)

=== Former leadership positions ===
- Percy Downe - Whip/Facilitator (interim) (November 14, 2019 – November 17, 2019)
- Joseph Day - Leader (interim) (November 14, 2019 – December 11, 2019)
- Terry Mercer - Deputy Leader (interim) (November 12 – December 11, 2019); Caucus Chair (December 12, 2019 – November 30, 2020)
- Dennis Dawson - Deputy Leader (December 12, 2019 – May 31, 2021)
- Patricia Bovey - Liaison (June 11, 2020 – January 31, 2023)
- Jane Cordy - Leader (December 12, 2019 – February 27, 2024)
- Brian Francis - Caucus Chair (December 1, 2020 – February 27, 2024)

== Membership ==
Name	Province (Division)	Joined caucus	Mandatory retirement date
Michèle Audette	Quebec (De Salaberry)	December 27, 2023	July 20, 2046
Wanda Thomas Bernard	Nova Scotia (East Preston)	July 8, 2020	August 1, 2028
Andrew Cardozo	Ontario	February 23, 2023	March 21, 2031
Rodger Cuzner	Nova Scotia	December 15, 2023	November 4, 2030
Brian Francis	Prince Edward Island	September 14, 2020	September 28, 2032
Daryl Fridhandler	Alberta	October 22, 2024	October 9, 2031
Amina Gerba	Quebec (Rigaud)	September 2, 2021	March 14, 2036
Peter Harder	Ontario (Ottawa)	May 14, 2020	August 25, 2027
Marty Klyne	Saskatchewan	September 2, 2020	March 6, 2032
Pierre Moreau	Quebec (The Laurentides)	November 21, 2024	December 12, 2032
Tracy Muggli	Saskatchewan	November 20, 2024	September 18, 2040
Karen Sorensen	Alberta	March 18, 2026	May 20, 2034
Kristopher Wells	Alberta	March 4, 2025	October 7, 2046
Judy White	Newfoundland and Labrador	November 22, 2023	January 11, 2039
Duncan Wilson	British Columbia	April 4, 2025	September 26, 2042
Danièle Henkel	Quebec (Alma)	February 12, 2025	January 16, 2031
Katherine Hay	Ontario	March 7, 2025	January 16, 2036

== See also ==
- Canadian Senators Group
- Independent Senators Group
- Senate Liberal Caucus
