= Standing Joint Committee on the Library of Parliament =

The Standing Joint Committee on the Library of Parliament (BILI) is a joint standing committee of the House of Commons and Senate of Canada. Its mandate is to advise the Speakers of the House and Senate in the direction of the Library of Parliament. This mandate is set out in Standing Orders 108 and 111 of the House and Rules 86 and 90 of the Senate.

== Studies ==
- The effectiveness, management and operation of the Library of Parliament
- The appointment of the Parliamentary Librarian, the Associate Parliamentary Librarian, and their officers and staff

== Membership ==
As of the 45th Canadian Parliament:

=== Senate ===
Caucus	Senator	Province
Canadian Senators Group	Scott Tannas, joint chair	AB
Progressive Senate Group	Rodger Cuzner	NS
Conservative	Leo Housakos	QC
Independent Senators Group	Mohamed-Iqbal Ravalia	NL
Independent Senators Group	Mary Coyle	NS

=== House of Commons ===
Party	Member	District
Liberal	Sukh Dhaliwal, joint chair	Surrey Newton, BC
Conservative	William Stevenson, vice chair	Yellowhead, AB
Bloc Québécois	Louis Plamondon, vice chair	Bécancour—Nicolet—Saurel—Alnôbak, QC
Liberal	Terry Beech	Burnaby North—Seymour, BC
Liberal	Bardish Chagger	Waterloo, ON
Liberal	Shaun Chen	Scarborough North, ON
Conservative	Amanpreet Gill	Calgary Skyview, AB
Conservative	Sukhman Gill	Abbotsford—South Langley, BC
Conservative	Kurt Holman	London—Fanshawe, ON
Liberal	Juanita Nathan	Pickering—Brooklin, ON
