= Canadian Senate Standing Committee on Official Languages =

Standing committee of the Senate of Canada

The Senate Standing Committee On Official languages (OLLO) is a standing committee of the Senate of Canada responsible for examining issues of Francophone culture in Canada, especially in regard to the Official Languages Act. It is mandated to study, as the Senate may decide, bills, messages, petitions, inquiries, papers and other matters relating to Canada's official languages generally.

== Organization ==
Senate rule 12-7(5) mandates the OLLO to study matters relating to official languages generally. The committee may study bills affecting the Official Languages Act (OLA), its application, modification, and associated regulations and directives.

The OLLO has a counterpart in the House of Commons Standing Committee on Official Languages (LANG).

== Members ==
Committee membership as of 6 March 2026:

Caucus	Member	Province
Independent Senators Group	Allister Surette, chair	NS
Conservative	Rose-May Poirier, deputy chair	NB
Progressive Senate Group	Amina Gerba (Note: Gerba, Moncion and Patterson were among the nine original members of the committee.)	QC
Progressive Senate Group	Danièle Henkel	QC
Independent Senators Group	Tony Loffreda	QC
Independent Senators Group	Lucie Moncion	ON
Canadian Senators Group	Rebecca Patterson	ON

Former members:

Caucus	Member	Province
Independent Senators Group	René Cormier	NB
Canadian Senators Group	Gigi Osler	MB

The Representative of the Government in the Senate and Leader of the Opposition in the Senate are both ex-officio members of the committee.
