= Mary Robinson (Canadian politician) =

Canadian parliamentarian

The Honourable Mary Robinson

Canadian Senator from Prince Edward Island
- Incumbent
- Assumed office January 22, 2024
- Nominated by: Justin Trudeau
- Appointed by: Mary Simon
- Preceded by: Diane Griffin

Personal details
- Born: August 3, 1970 (age 55)
- Party: Canadian Senators Group

Mary Robinson (born August 3, 1970) is a Canadian parliamentarian who has served as a senator from Prince Edward Island since January 2024. Robinson has experience in the agriculture sector.

Robinson is vice-president of the World Farmers' Organisation and managing partner of the Robinsion Group of Companies, a sixth-generation farm and agribusiness based in Albany, Prince Edward Island. In 2019, she became the first Prince Edward Islander and the first woman to be elected president of the Canadian Federation of Agriculture.
