= List of Senate of Canada appointments by prime minister =

This is a list of Canadian Senate appointments during a prime minister's tenure. Members of the Senate of Canada are appointed by the governor general of Canada on the recommendation of his or her prime minister. This list is broken down by party and further sorted into three categories: senators appointed who sat in the government caucus, senators appointed who sat in opposition caucuses, and senators appointed who sat in neither.

Only three prime ministers have recommended with any frequency the appointment of senators belonging to opposition parties: John A. Macdonald, Pierre Trudeau, and Paul Martin. The remaining prime ministers have, between them, recommended the appointment of only six opposition senators. Of those six, five were from the party forming the Official Opposition: three were appointed on the recommendation of Prime Minister Robert Borden, who was trying to create a cross-party coalition National Government during World War I; one was made on the recommendation of John Sparrow David Thompson; and one was made on the recommendation of Louis St. Laurent, upon the advice of his strategists, as the PC Party was in danger of losing official party status in the Senate by dropping below five seats. The remaining one was from a minor party. One prime minister, Kim Campbell, recommended no senators during her time in office.

Prime minister	Term(s)		Total	Party						Government		Opposition		Non-partisan	
Prime minister	From	To	Total	Lib.	Cons. (Note: The Cons. column includes appointees who are members of the historical Conservative party (prior to 1942), the Progressive Conservative Party (1942-2003), and the Conservative Party of Canada (since 2003).)	Ind. Lib.	Ind. Cons.	No af.	Other	#	%	#	%	#	%
Royal proclamation	October 23, 1867		73	27 (Note: Includes Charles Cormier and Luc Letellier de St-Just, who sat as Nationalist Liberals. Also includes William Todd, who declined appointment.)	45 (Note: Includes eight Liberal Conservatives. Also includes Narcisse-Fortunat Belleau and Edward Barron Chandler, who declined appointment.)	—	1	—	—	45	61.6	27	36.9	1	1.2
Macdonald	July 1, 1867	November 5, 1873	91	9	78 (Note: Includes 25 Liberal Conservatives. Also includes Joseph Bolduc, who sat as a Nationalist Conservative.)	1	1	1	—	78	85.7	9	9.8	3	3.3
Macdonald	October 17, 1878	June 6, 1891	91	9	78	1	1	1	—	78	85.7	9	9.8	3	3.3
Mackenzie	November 7, 1873	October 8, 1878	16	16 (Note: Includes William Henry Brouse, who sat as a Reformer, as well as Christian Henry Pozer and Hector Fabre, who both sat as Nationalists.)	—	—	—	—	—	16	100.0	0	0.0	0	0.0
Abbott	June 16, 1891	November 24, 1892	6	—	6 (Note: Includes one Liberal Conservative)	—	—	—	—	6	100.0	0	0.0	0	0.0
Thompson	December 5, 1892	December 12, 1894	5	1	4	—	—	—	—	4	80.0	1	20.0	0	0.0
Bowell	December 21, 1894	April 27, 1896	13	—	13 (Note: Includes four Liberal Conservatives)	—	—	—	—	13	100.0	0	0.0	0	0.0
Tupper	May 1, 1896	July 8, 1896	1	—	1	—	—	—	—	1	100.0	0	0.0	0	0.0
Laurier	July 11, 1896	October 6, 1911	81	80	—	1	—	—	—	80	98.8	0	0.0	1	1.2
Borden	October 10, 1911	July 10, 1920	62	3	57	—	1	—	1 (Note: Liberal-Unionist senator William Proudfoot)	58 (Note: Includes one Liberal–Unionist)	93.6	3	4.8	0	0.0
Meighen	July 10, 1920	December 29, 1921	15	—	13	—	—	1	1 (Note: Liberal–Unionist senator Sanford Johnston Crowe)	14	93.3	0	0.0	1	6.7
Meighen	June 29, 1926	September 25, 1926	15	—	13	—	—	1	1	14	93.3	0	0.0	1	6.7
King	December 29, 1921	June 28, 1926	103	103 (Note: Includes Robert Forke, who sat as a Liberal-Progressive)	—	—	—	—	—	103	100.0	0	0.0	0	0.0
King	September 25, 1926	August 7, 1930	103	103	—	—	—	—	—	103	100.0	0	0.0	0	0.0
King	October 23, 1935	November 15, 1948	103	103	—	—	—	—	—	103	100.0	0	0.0	0	0.0
Bennett	August 7, 1930	October 23, 1935	33	—	32	—	—	1	—	32	97.0	0	0.0	1	3.0
St. Laurent	November 15, 1948	June 21, 1957	55	51	1	2	—	1	—	51	92.7	1	1.8	3	5.5
Diefenbaker	June 21, 1957	April 22, 1963	37	—	36	—	1	—	—	36	97.3	0	0.0	1	2.7
Pearson	April 22, 1963	April 20, 1968	39	38	—	1	—	—	—	38	97.4	0	0.0	1	2.6
P. E. Trudeau	April 20, 1968	June 4, 1979	81	70	7	—	—	3	1 (Note: Social Credit senator Ernest Manning)	70	86.4	8	9.9	3	3.7
P. E. Trudeau	March 3, 1980	June 30, 1984	81	70	7	—	—	3	1	70	86.4	8	9.9	3	3.7
Clark	June 4, 1979	March 3, 1980	11	—	11	—	—	—	—	11	100.0	0	0.0	0	0.0
Turner	June 30, 1984	September 17, 1984	3	3	—	—	—	—	—	3	100.0	0	0.0	0	0.0
Mulroney	September 17, 1984	June 25, 1993	57	—	55	—	—	1	1 (Note: Reform Party senator Stanley Waters, who had been elected in the 1989 Alberta Senate nominee election.)	55	96.4	1	1.8	1	1.8
Campbell	June 25, 1993	November 4, 1993	0	—	—	—	—	—	—	—	—	—	—	—	—
Chrétien	November 4, 1993	December 12, 2003	75	72	—	—	—	3	—	72	96.0	0	0.0	3	4.0
Martin	December 12, 2003	February 6, 2006	17	12	2	—	2 (Note: Includes Nancy Ruth and Elaine McCoy who were appointed as senators for the defunct Progressive Conservatives. Nancy Ruth subsequently joined the Conservatives.)	—	1 (Note: New Democratic Party senator Lillian Dyck. She was not recognized by the NDP caucus and joined the Liberal caucus in 2009.)	12	70.6	5	29.4	0	0.0
Harper	February 6, 2006	November 4, 2015	59	—	59 (Note: Two senators, Bert Brown and Betty Unger, had been elected in the 2004 Alberta Senate nominee election.) (Note: Scott Tannas was appointed on March 25, 2013, having been elected in the 2012 Alberta Senate nominee election.)	—	—	—	—	59	100.0	0	0.0	0	0.0
J. Trudeau	November 4, 2015	March 14, 2025	100	—	—	—	—	100	—	—	—	—	—	100	100.0
Carney	March 14, 2025		4	—	—	—	—	4	—	—	—	—	—	100	100.0
