= Robert Black (Canadian politician) =

Canadian Senator from Ontario

The Honourable Robert Black

Chair of the Canadian Senators Group
- In office November 4, 2019 – October 24, 2023
- Leader: Scott Tannas
- Preceded by: Position established
- Succeeded by: Gigi Osler

Canadian Senator from Ontario
- Incumbent
- Assumed office February 15, 2018
- Nominated by: Justin Trudeau
- Appointed by: Julie Payette

Personal details
- Born: March 27, 1962 (age 64) Fergus, Ontario, Canada
- Party: Canadian Senators Group
- Other political affiliations: Independent Senators Group (2018-2019)

Robert Black (born March 27, 1962) is a Canadian politician. He was named to the Senate of Canada by Prime Minister Justin Trudeau on February 15, 2018. Prior to his appointment, Black was a leader in the agricultural community. He has been chief executive of the Rural Ontario Institute since 2010 and has also been involved in the 4-H farm youth organization since the 1970s. He subsequently joined the Independent Senators Group and, on November 4, 2019, he joined the Canadian Senators Group.

Black has also been a councillor on the Wellington County council from 2014 until his appointment to the Senate and was a civil servant with the Ontario Ministry of Agriculture for fifteen years. He has also served on the Ontario Agricultural Hall of Fame's board of directors.

== Early life and education ==
Black was born and raised in Fergus, Ontario. In 1981 he graduated from Centre Wellington District High School. He attended the University of Guelph in the Bachelor of Science in Agriculture program, graduating in 1985, and subsequently earned his Bachelor of Education from Queen's University in Kingston, graduating in 1990.
