= CCHL (disambiguation) =

The Central Canada Hockey League is a junior hockey league in the Ottawa area.

CCHL may also stand for:

- Christchurch City Holdings Ltd, New Zealand
- Cytochrome c heme-lyase, or Holocytochrome-c synthase, an enzyme
- Communauté de communes of Haut-Livradois, a federation of Communes of the Puy-de-Dôme department, France
- Canadian College of Health Leaders, establishers of the Certified Health Executive program
