= 2012 Alberta Senate nominee election =

Canadian election

← 2004	April 23, 2012	2021 →

3 persons to become senators-in-waiting
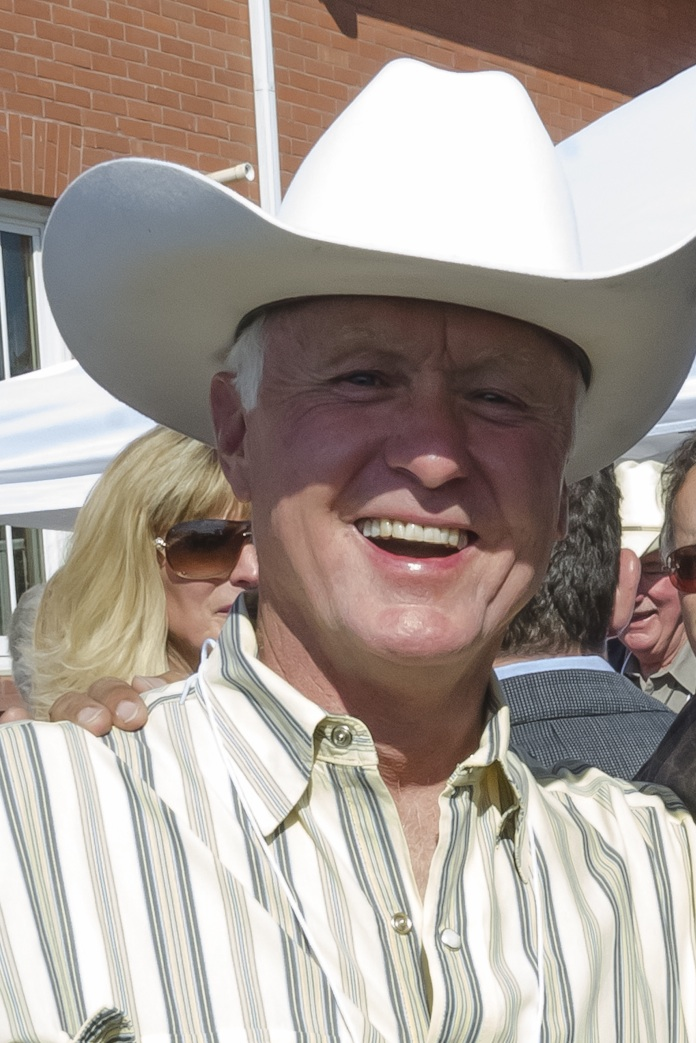
	First party	Second party	Third party
		S.T.	M.S.
Candidate	Doug Black	Scott Tannas	Mike Shaikh
Party	Progressive Conservative (Note: Served in the Conservative Party of Canada senate caucus following his appointment. Later switched affiliation to the Independent Senators Group, and then the Canadian Senators Group.)	Progressive Conservative (Note: Served in the Conservative Party of Canada senate caucus following his appointment. Later switched affiliation to the Canadian Senators Group.)	Progressive Conservative
Popular vote	427,745	351,761	309,587
Percentage	15.90%	13.07%	11.51%
Appointed to Senate	Jan 25, 2013	March 25, 2013	Not appointed

The 2012 Alberta Senate nominee election, formally the 4th Senate nominee election of Alberta, was held to elect three nominees for appointment to the Senate of Canada to represent the province of Alberta. It was to be held in the fall of 2010 but was delayed by then-Premier Ed Stelmach. His successor, Alison Redford, announced that it would, be held in conjunction with the 2012 provincial election before June 1 2012. On March 26 it was announced that it would be held on April 23 2012. The results followed the provincial election closely, with the Progressive Conservatives winning all three positions and the Wildrose Party a close second.

== Background ==
Alberta is the only province to hold elections for nominees to the Senate. The elections, held under Alberta's Senate Selection Act, are non-binding on the prime minister when he advises the governor general on appointments to the Senate. Under the act, the number of Senate nominees, also known as senators-in-waiting, to be elected is set by the Lieutenant Governor-in-Council when issuing the writ of election.

The Lieutenant Governor, also on the advice of ministers, sets the term for senators-in-waiting. At the time senators-in-waiting were elected at the 2004 election, the term was six years from the date of the election. As discussed below, those terms were extended to the earlier of December 13, 2013, or the issuance of writs for a new election. Under regulations issued on January 20, 2012, senators-in-waiting will be elected for terms ending when new writs are issued, giving the premier the flexibility to call new Senate nominee elections at will. As seen with Premier Stelmach, the premier effectively had this power under the previous regulations by retaining the ability to amend them.

=== Reversal and term extension ===
Premier Ed Stelmach announced in October 2009 that new Senate nominee elections would be held because the incumbents' terms were set to end on November 22, 2010. The PC Government announced on April 29, 2010, that it was extending the terms of the three senators-in-waiting beyond November 22, 2010, to December 2, 2013, unless elections were called earlier. The Government said the move would save Albertans the cost of the election. The announcement came two days after the federal government introduced Senate election legislation and urged the other provinces to follow Alberta's lead in Senate reform.

Reaction from the incumbent senators-in-waiting was mixed. Independent Link Byfield panned the decision and has stated he would refuse an appointment without a new mandate. Betty Unger stated the term limits should be respected and fresh elections should be called that fall.

Progressive Conservative Cliff Breitkreuz supported the decision to extend the appointments and stated that he won't run again in a new election. All three incumbents and other pundits agreed that the move was made to help the Progressive Conservatives avoid an election loss to the Wildrose Party. The Wildrose Party stated it would proceed with nominating new Senate candidates at its 2010 convention.

== Candidates ==
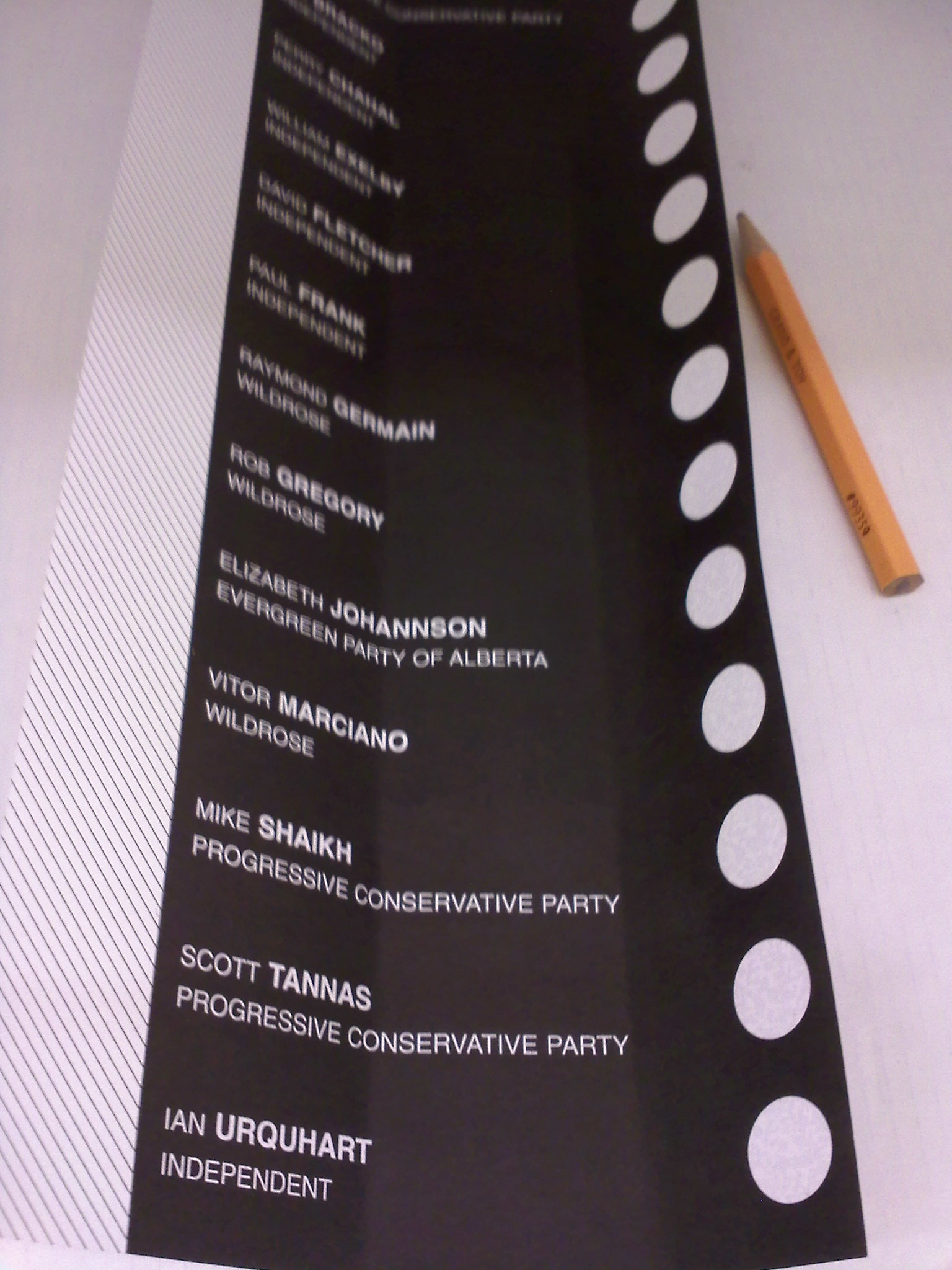
Ballot paper

There were thirteen candidates registered and nominated between three provincial political parties and independents. The governing Progressive Conservatives, who won three positions in the 2004 Senate nominee nominated a full slate of three candidates.

Mike Shaikh, who is chair of Calgary Police Commission, former member of the Canadian Association of Police Boards and the Alberta Law Enforcement Response Team, Current Board of Governors member and past Senator of the University of Calgary, and a board member of the Alberta Children's Hospital. One of his visions as a Senator would be to build a National Safe Communities Program. He also believes in recognizing, rewarding and celebrating volunteerism and philanthropy. However, his top priority in his platform would be to help all Canadians understand the importance of Alberta's energy resources to the nation. Mike Shaikh, has received both the Premier Klein Leader Service Award and the University of Calgary Distinguished Alumni MAX Award.

The Wildrose, who ran three candidates under its former Alberta Alliance banner in 2004, has three nominated. On March 27, 2012, Elections Alberta determined that one candidate, Jeff Callaway, was ineligible to run, due to not filing a financial statement on time in the 2008 provincial election.

The new Evergreen Party of Alberta has nominated a single candidate, Elizabeth Johannson, in the hope to have a better chance to elect its candidate under the multiple vote ballot. The federal Green Party of Canada and its leader Elizabeth May have endorsed running a Senate nominee.

Rounding out the field are six independent candidates, including, David Fletcher, an original member/supporter of the Canadian Committee for a Triple E Senate and a 3rd generation Albertan, William Exelby, a Certified Management Accountant; Len Bracko, a former provincial Liberal MLA for St. Albert; Paul Frank, BA, JD, LL.L (summa cum laude), graduate of the National Law Program at the University of Ottawa, a lawyer and a Prosecutor for the City of Calgary and University of Alberta professor Ian Urquhart.

Fletcher is a licensed Real Estate Appraiser who holds a CRA (Canadian Residential Appraiser) designation. He is a founding member/supporter of the Canadian Committee for a Triple E Senate and presented a brief to the Senate Committee on Banking in 1990 against the GST. He plans on proposing a constitutional amendment on Senate Reform which would better reflect the Canada of 2012 vs 1867 in order to increase the representation from the west. He also plans on sitting as an Independent in order to lobby senators from all parties.

Exelby is a graduate and distinguished alumni of Grant MacEwan Community College. He joined Deloitte and Touche where he earned his CMA designation and Trustee License. Exelby is also an acclaimed specialist in forensic accounting. His firm Exelby & Partners Ltd. has seven offices in northern Alberta and is a leading financial service firm in the province. As a senator, his priorities include, fighting for an accountable, effective, and elected senate. He plans to lobby the government to scrap committee pay at all levels of Government. He also has the goal of building a better "capture" system for public opinion through public forums, direct mail campaigns, phone contact and digital media. Exelby has committed to channel his senatorial salary into improving data collection so as to represent Albertans' views and making the Canadian Senate work for Albertans.

Urquhart worked for the federal Progressive Conservatives in 1980s, but has been critical of Stephen Harper's current government. He's running to push for environmental issues and a less toxic partisan tone in Ottawa.

Frank has an undergraduate degree from the University of Calgary and law degrees from the University of Saskatchewan and the University of Ottawa. He is a long-time public servant whose legal career is based on representing the public interest in all levels of court. Frank is running as an independent conservative candidate as he believes that Senate candidates should not be tied to provincial parties or provincial party platforms. His only political affiliation is with the Conservative Party of Canada. Frank believes in and supports Senate elections, Senate accountability and set term limits for all senators.

== Results ==
Electors voted for up to three candidates. The three candidates with the most votes were elected Senate Nominees, and as Senate vacancies arose, each was recommended to the Governor-General by order of total votes. On January 25, 2013, Prime Minister Stephen Harper appointed Doug Black to the Senate, and on March 25, 2013, Scott Tannas was appointed.

=== By candidate ===
Official poll results as per report posted by Elections Alberta:

Candidate	Party	Votes #	Votes %	Ballots %	Elected	Appointed	1st	2nd	3rd
Doug Black	Progressive Conservative	427,745	15.90%	38.95%	✓	January 25, 2013	68/87	8/87	3/87
Scott Tannas	Progressive Conservative	351,761	13.07%	32.04%	✓	March 25, 2013	2/87	46/87	14/87
Mike Shaikh	Progressive Conservative	309,587	11.51%	28.19%	✓		2/87	9/87	31/87
Rob Gregory	Wildrose	300,883	11.18%	27.40%			8/87	10/87	18/87
Raymond Germain	Wildrose	299,800	11.14%	27.30%			5/87	13/87	13/87
Vitor Marciano	Wildrose	246,787	9.17%	22.47%			0/87	0/87	6/87
Elizabeth Johannson	EverGreen	149,844	5.57%	13.65%			1/87	1/87	1/87
Len Bracko	Independent	141,830	5.27%	12.92%			1/87	0/87	0/87
David Fletcher	Independent	114,940	4.27%	10.47%			0/87	0/87	0/87
Ian Urquhart	Independent	107,397	3.99%	9.78%			0/87	0/87	1/87
Paul Frank	Independent	93,586	3.48%	8.52%			0/87	0/87	0/87
William Exelby	Independent	81,476	3.03%	7.42%			0/87	0/87	0/87
Perry Chahal	Independent	65,164	2.42%	5.93%			0/87	0/87	0/87
Total		2,690,800		1,098,021					
Rejected, Spoiled and Declined		189,059							
Total Ballots Cast		1,287,080							

=== By party ===
Affiliation	2004	2012	Total votes	Votes %	% Change
Progressive Conservative	3	3	1,089,093	40.47%	-18.17%
Wildrose	0	0	847,470	31.50%	+8.51%
Independent	1	0	604,393	22.46%	+4.09%
EverGreen	^{*}	0	149,844	5.57%	+5.57%
Total	4	3	2,690,800	100.00%	
