= Canadian Senate Standing Committee on Social Affairs, Science and Technology =

Standing committee of the Senate of Canada

The Senate Standing Committee on Social Affairs, Science and Technology (SOCI) is a standing committee of the Senate of Canada.

It has a mandate to examine legislation and matters relating to social affairs, science and technology generally, including: (1) veterans affairs; (2) Indian and Inuit affairs; (3) cultural affairs and the arts; (4) social and labour matters; (5) health and welfare; (6) pensions; (7) housing; (8) fitness and amateur sport; (9) employment and immigration; (10) consumer affairs; and (11) youth affairs (Rule 86(1)(m)).

From 1984 to 2000 the committee in each session established a Subcommittee on Veterans Affairs to examine matters pertaining specifically to Canadian veterans.

== Members ==
As of the 45th Canadian Parliament:

Caucus	Member	Province
Independent Senators Group	Rosemary Moodie, chair	ON
Canadian Senators Group	Gigi Osler, deputy chair	MB
Independent Senators Group	Dawn Arnold	NB
Independent Senators Group	Victor Boudreau	NB
Non-affiliated	Patrick Brazeau	QC
Canadian Senators Group	Sharon Burey	ON
Progressive Senate Group	Rodger Cuzner	NS
Independent Senators Group	Margo Lainne Greenwood	BC
Progressive Senate Group	Katherine Hay	ON
Non-affiliated	Marilou McPhedran	MB
Progressive Senate Group	Tracy Muggli	SK
Independent Senators Group	Chantal Petitclerc	QC
Independent Senators Group	Paulette Senior	ON

The Representative of the Government in the Senate and Leader of the Opposition in the Senate are both ex-officio members of the committee.
