= Diane Griffin (conservationist) =

Canadian politician

The Honourable Diane Griffin OPEI

Deputy Leader of the Canadian Senators Group
- In office May 14, 2021 – March 18, 2022
- Leader: Scott Tannas
- Preceded by: Josée Verner
- Succeeded by: Dennis Patterson

Canadian Senator from Prince Edward Island
- In office November 10, 2016 – March 18, 2022
- Nominated by: Justin Trudeau
- Appointed by: David Johnston

Personal details
- Born: March 18, 1947 (age 79)
- Party: Canadian Senators Group
- Other political affiliations: Independent Senators Group (2017-2019)

Diane Griffin, OPEI (born March 18, 1947) is a Canadian conservationist from Prince Edward Island. Griffin is a former provincial deputy minister of environmental resources and a recipient of the Governor General's Conservation Award, the Queen Elizabeth II Diamond Jubilee Medal and the P.E.I. Environment award. She also served as executive director of the Island Nature Trust. In 2010, Griffin was awarded the Prince Edward Island Medal of Merit for her contributions to the environment of the province. On October 27, 2016, Griffin was named to the Senate of Canada by Prime Minister Justin Trudeau to sit as an independent. Until her appointment, she served as a councillor on the Stratford, P.E.I. town council. Griffin assumed office on November 10, 2016. She subsequently jointed the Independent Senators Group. On November 4, 2019, she joined the Canadian Senators Group. After turning 75 on March 18, 2022, Senator Griffin retired from the senate due to mandatory retirement rules.
