= Rebecca Patterson =

Canadian senator (born 1965)

Rear-Admiral The Honourable Rebecca Patterson OMM MSM CD

Deputy Leader of the Canadian Senators Group
- Incumbent
- Assumed office October 31, 2023
- Leader: Scott Tannas
- Preceded by: Dennis Patterson

Canadian Senator from Ontario
- Incumbent
- Assumed office November 21, 2022
- Nominated by: Justin Trudeau
- Appointed by: Mary Simon

Personal details
- Born: June 15, 1965 (age 61)
- Party: Canadian Senators Group
- Education: University of Ottawa

Military service
- Allegiance: Canada
- Branch/service: Royal Canadian Navy
- Years of service: 1989–2022
- Rank: Rear-admiral

Rebecca Patterson, OMM MSM CD CHE (born June 15, 1965) is a Canadian politician, registered nurse, and military officer. She was appointed to the Senate of Canada on November 21, 2022, on the advice of Prime Minister Justin Trudeau. On January 12, 2023, Patterson joined the Canadian Senators Group.

== Career ==
Patterson is a registered nurse and a retired Rear Admiral in the Canadian Armed Forces (CAF). She is the first person with a military nursing background to ever lead at the rank of Flag (General/Admiral) Officer in Canada.

Patterson enrolled in the Canadian Armed Forces as a critical care Nursing Officer in 1989 under the Direct Entry Officer plan and held various leadership roles within the CAF. She obtained her diploma in nursing in 1987 from Niagara College and BScN / PCNP certificate from the University of Ottawa in 1997 (Summa Cum Laude). After an occupational transfer to Health Services Operations Officer in 1998, she went on to qualify as a certified health executive with the Canadian College of Health Leaders.

Patterson worked in many different domains of healthcare which include the provision of direct patient care, delivery and leading CAF medical education and training, overseeing and directing national level medical planning in support of CAF missions at home and abroad and leading a large CAF primary care health centre. In 2012, she assumed the position as Commander of 1 Health Services Group and was responsible for the provision of healthcare to CAF personnel in the west and north of Canada. In 2016, she was appointed as the Deputy Commander, Canadian Forces Health Services Group and was subsequently appointed Director General Canadian Armed Forces Strategic Response Team - Sexual Misconduct in 2018.

Patterson has had the privilege of serving with the CAF on overseas missions and has deployed as a member of Op SCALPEL with 1 Canadian Field Hospital during the Persian Gulf Conflict in 1991 (Saudi Arabia), Op DELIVERANCE in support of the Canadian Airborne Regiment in 1993 (Somalia), and Op ATTENTION with the NATO Training Mission – Afghanistan (Kabul) 2011-2012, where she was responsible for leading a multinational team tasked to assist the Afghan National Army and Afghan National Police to re-establish their medical education and training system.

== Recognition and awards ==
In February 2014, she was recognized for her work in Afghanistan and was awarded the Meritorious Service Medal from the Governor General of Canada and was recently inducted as an Officer in the Order of Military Merit in 2018. She is also the recipient of numerous other honours and awards, including the Governor General’s Meritorious Service Medal, the Ontario Premier’s Award for Excellence in Health Sciences for Ontario College Graduates, and the Niagara College Canada Distinguished Alumni Award. In 2021, Patterson was inducted as an Honorary Fellow of the Royal Canadian Geographic Society for her contributions to aid seniors in long-term care facilities during the COVID-19 pandemic and to help women overcome barriers.

== Volunteer work ==
She is a founder and director of Soldiers Helping Soldiers, an organization that helps veterans who are experiencing or at risk of homelessness.
