= Gigi Osler =

Canadian politician and physician

The Honourable Gigi Osler FRCSC
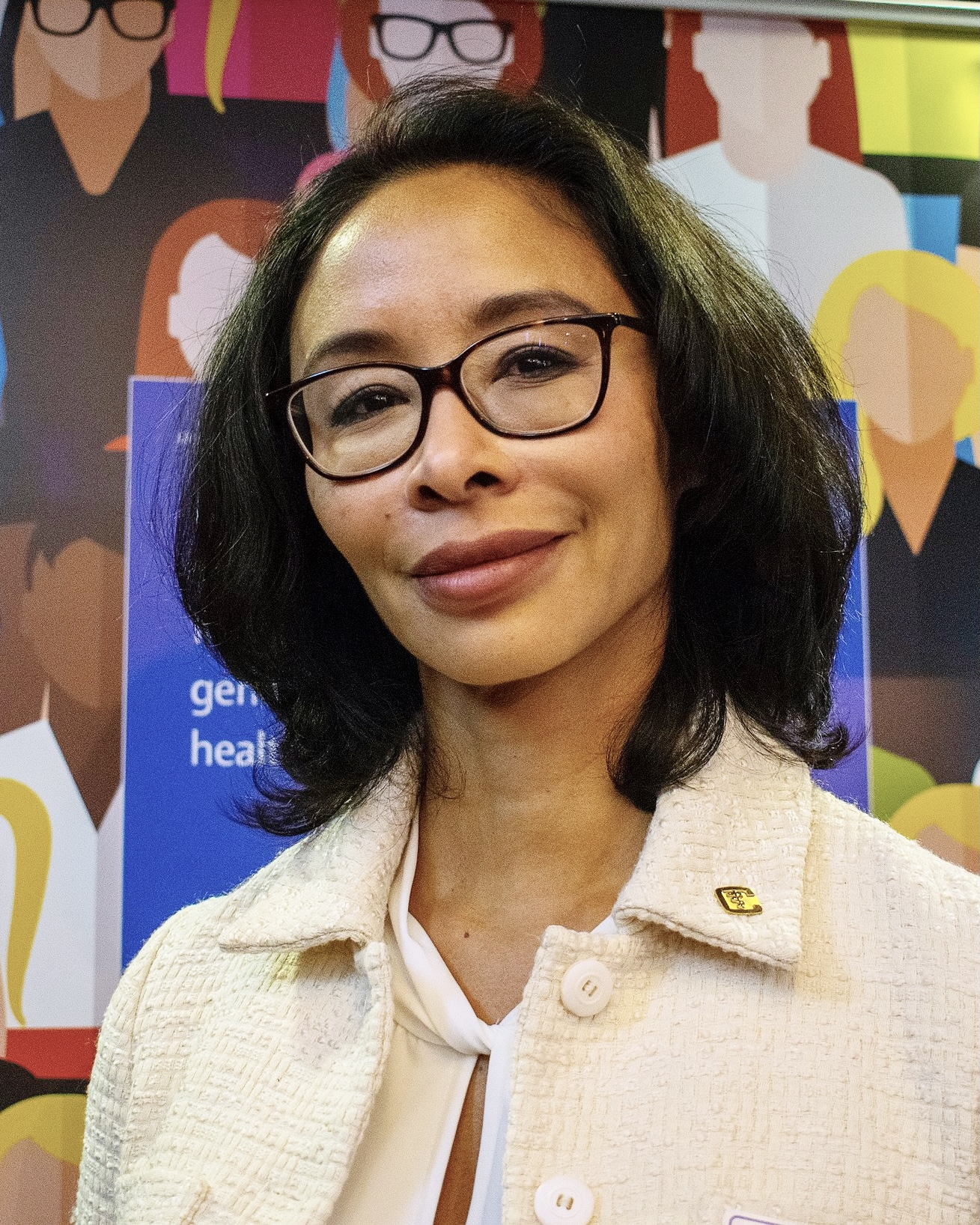

Chair of the Canadian Senators Group
- Incumbent
- Assumed office October 24, 2023
- Leader: Scott Tannas
- Preceded by: Robert Black

Canadian Senator from Manitoba
- Incumbent
- Assumed office September 26, 2022
- Nominated by: Justin Trudeau
- Appointed by: Mary Simon
- Preceded by: Murray Sinclair

Personal details
- Born: Flordeliz Sharma; September 9, 1968 (age 58) Winnipeg, Manitoba, Canada
- Party: Canadian Senators Group
- Spouse: John Hugh Cameron Osler (m. 1993)
- Education: University of Manitoba (BSc, MD)
- Website: www.drgigiosler.com

Flordeliz "Gigi" Osler (née Sharma) FRCSC (born September 9, 1968) is a Canadian politician, physician, and assistant professor at the University of Manitoba. From 2018 until 2019, she served as President of the Canadian Medical Association. On September 26, 2022, Osler was appointed to the Senate of Canada by Governor General Mary Simon.

== Early life and education ==
Osler was born in Winnipeg, Manitoba. Her mother was a nurse from the Philippines and her father was an Indian physician. As a child she lived on-site in the Riverview Health Centre.

She studied medicine at the University of Manitoba and graduated in 1992. She remained there to specialize in head and neck surgery and graduated from residency in 1997. Thereafter, she completed a rhinology position at St. Paul's Hospital Vancouver, specializing in endoscopic sinus surgery. Osler later recounted that in the 1990s "surgery was still very much a male-dominated field. I was told, ‘Surgery’s too tough. You should look at pediatrics.’"

== Career ==
Osler is the current Head of the Section of Otolaryngology-Head and Neck Surgery at St. Boniface Hospital and is an Assistant Professor with the Department of Otolaryngology at the University of Manitoba College of Medicine.

In 2011, she volunteered with the Canadian Helping Kids in Vietnam's medical mission to Long Xuyên, which focused on delivering medical equipment and educating Vietnamese doctors and nurses. She has also been part of several missions to train surgeons in Africa and has spent several years in Mbarara. She has been an invited faculty member at the Mbarara University of Science and Technology.

In 2017, Dr. Osler defended the practice of "income sprinkling", which allows high-earning professionals and business owners to reduce taxes by distributing income to family members who may do minimal work.

In 2018, Osler was announced as the president of the Canadian Medical Association. She has been a member of the Royal College of Physicians and Surgeons of Canada Regional Advisory Committee. She is also a Fellow of the Royal College.

In 2021, Dr. Osler became president of the Federation of Medical Women of Canada.

On September 26, 2022, Osler was appointed to the Senate of Canada by the office of Prime Minister Justin Trudeau. On January 10, 2023, Osler joined the Canadian Senators Group. She was deputy chair of the Canadian Senate Standing Committee on Social Affairs, Science and Technology in the 45th Canadian Parliament.

=== Physician health ===
Osler believes that maintaining the health and wellness of oneself should be incorporated into medical training. In 2015, Osler co-chaired the Canadian Conference on Physician Health.

== Personal life ==
Osler is married to John Hugh Cameron Osler and has two children. She is the great-great-grand niece-in-law of William Osler by affinity.
