= Abbotsford West =

Provincial electoral district in British Columbia, Canada

British Columbia electoral district
- Location in the Lower Mainland

Provincial electoral district
- Legislature: Legislative Assembly of British Columbia
MLA
Korky Neufeld
Conservative
- District created: 2008
- First contested: 2009
- Last contested: 2026

Demographics
- Population (2021): 61,904
- Area (km²): 91
- Pop. density (per km²): 680.3
- Census division: Fraser Valley Regional District
- Census subdivision: Abbotsford

Abbotsford West is a provincial electoral district in the Canadian province of British Columbia established by the Electoral Districts Act, 2008. It was first contested in the 2009 British Columbia general election.

== Geography ==
The electoral district comprises the part of the City of Abbotsford (including the Matsqui and Mount Lehman) lying within this boundary: commencing at the northern limit of said city and the Fraser River, south along Bradner Road and its production to Highway 1, thence east-southeast along said highway to Fishtrap Creek, thence northeast along said creek to Old Yale Road, thence east along said road to McMillan Road, thence north along said road to Old Clayburn Road, thence west along said road to BC-11 (Sumas Way), thence north along said road to the northern limit of said city, thence west along the northern city limit to the point of origin.

== Members of the Legislative Assembly ==
This riding has elected the following members of the Legislative Assembly:

Abbotsford West
Assembly	Years	Member	Party
Abbotsford-Mount Lehman prior to 2009
39th	2009–2013	Mike de Jong	Liberal
40th	2013–2017	Mike de Jong	Liberal
41st	2017–2020	Mike de Jong	Liberal
42nd	2020–2023	Mike de Jong	Liberal
42nd	2023–2024	Mike de Jong	BC United
43rd	2024–2026	Korky Neufeld	Conservative
44th	2026–present	Korky Neufeld	Conservative

On account of the realignment of electoral boundaries, most incumbents did not represent the entirety of their listed district during the preceding legislative term. Mike de Jong, British Columbia Liberal Party was re-elected in 1996, 2001 and 2005 to the Abbotsford-Mount Lehman riding. He was also elected in this new redistricted riding in the 2009 election.

== Electoral history ==
2026 British Columbia general election
** Preliminary results — Not yet official **
Party	Candidate	Votes	%	±%	Expenditures
Conservative	Korky Neufeld	9,696	61.9		
New Democratic	Jules Côté	4,517	28.9		
CentreBC	Gurpreet Chahal	1,442	9.2		
Total valid votes					
Total rejected ballots					
Turnout					
Registered voters					
Conservative hold		Swing			
Source: Elections BC

2024 British Columbia general election
Party	Candidate	Votes	%	±%	Expenditures
Conservative	Korky Neufeld	11,483	58.35	+49.6	$37,532.61
New Democratic	Graeme Hutchison	7,255	36.87	−0.3	$9,684.73
Independent	James Davison	940	4.78	–	$8,078.81
Total valid votes/expenses limit		19,678	99.76	–	$71,700.08
Total rejected ballots		47	0.24	–	
Turnout		19,725	52.14	–	
Registered voters		37,833			
Conservative notional gain from BC United		Swing		N/A (Note: Swing cannot be calculated as BC United did not run a candidate in this riding.)	
Source: Elections BC

2020 provincial election redistributed results
Party	%
Liberal	45.0
New Democratic	37.2
Conservative	8.8
Green	8.5
Others	0.5

2020 British Columbia general election
Party	Candidate	Votes	%	±%	Expenditures
Liberal	Mike de Jong	8,880	45.51	−9.72	$46,271.14
New Democratic	Preet Rai	7,119	36.49	+5.72	$5,639.35
Conservative	Michael Henshall	1,766	9.05	–	$7,727.07
Green	Kevin Eastwood	1,671	8.56	−2.28	$330.52
Vision	Sukhi Gill	75	0.38	–	$2,685.00
Total valid votes		19,511	100.00	–	
Total rejected ballots					
Turnout					
Registered voters					
Source: Elections BC

2017 British Columbia general election
Party	Candidate	Votes	%	±%	Expenditures
Liberal	Mike de Jong	11,618	55.23	+4.85	$71,415
New Democratic	Preet Rai	6,474	30.77	+1.36	$23,646
Green	Kevin Allan Eastwood	2,280	10.84	+6.18	$306
Christian Heritage	Lynn Simcox	516	2.45	–	$1,221
Libertarian	Dave Sharkey	149	0.71	–	
Total valid votes		21,037	100.00		
Total rejected ballots		148	0.70		
Turnout		21,185	57.30		
Source: Elections BC

2013 British Columbia general election
Party	Candidate	Votes	%
Liberal	Mike de Jong	9,473	50.38
New Democratic	Sukhi Dhami	5,430	29.41
Conservative	Paul Brian Redekopp	1,791	9.53
Independent	Moe Gill	1,082	5.75
Green	Stephen Carl OShea	877	4.66
Excalibur	Kerry-Lynn Osbourne	49	0.26
Total valid votes		18.702	100.00
Total rejected ballots		245	1.29
Turnout		18,947	59.38
Registered voters		31,910	
Source: Elections BC

B.C. General Election 2009 Abbotsford West
Party	Candidate	Votes	%	±%
Liberal	Mike de Jong	8,992	55.81	-2.5
NDP	Taranjit Purewal	5,106	31.69	+0.4
Conservative	Dalbir Benipal	1,043	6.48	n/a
Green	Karen Durant	970	6.02	n/a
Total		16,111	100.00%	

== See also ==
- List of British Columbia provincial electoral districts
- Canadian provincial electoral districts
