= Mike de Jong =

Canadian politician (born 1963/64)

Mike de Jong KC
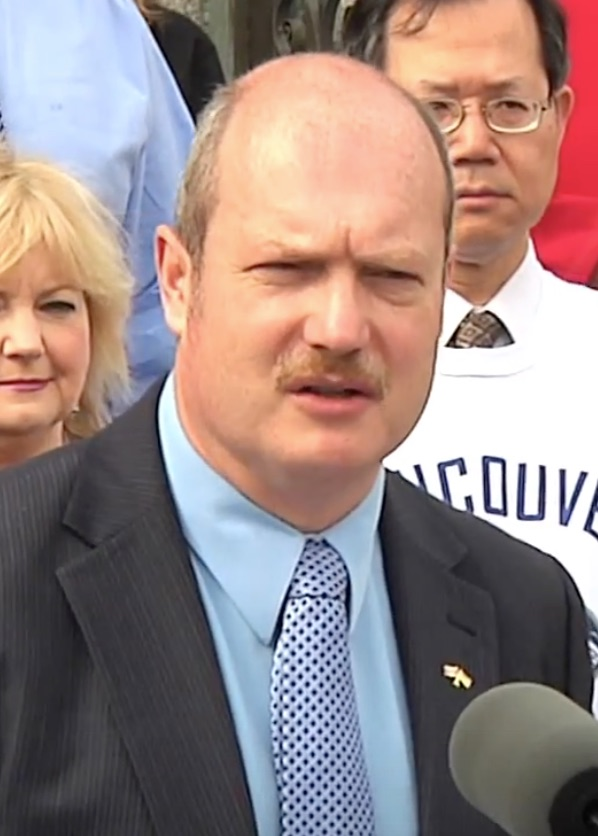
- De Jong in 2011

Member of the British Columbia Legislative Assembly for Abbotsford West Abbotsford-Mount Lehman (2001–2009) Matsqui (1994–2001)
- In office February 17, 1994 – September 21, 2024
- Preceded by: Peter Albert Dueck
- Succeeded by: Korky Neufeld
British Columbia Executive Council
Minister responsible for Multiculturalism
In office March 21, 2013 – June 10, 2013
Premier	Christy Clark
Preceded by	Ralph Sultan
Succeeded by	Teresa Wat (Asia Pacific Strategy and Multiculturalism)
Minister of Finance
In office September 5, 2012 – July 18, 2017
Premier	Christy Clark
Preceded by	Shirley Bond (acting)
Succeeded by	Carole James
Minister of Health
In office March 14, 2011 – September 5, 2012
Premier	Christy Clark
Preceded by	Colin Hansen
Succeeded by	Margaret MacDiarmid
Minister of Public Safety and Solicitor General
In office May 5, 2010 – October 25, 2010
Premier	Gordon Campbell
Preceded by	Kash Heed
Succeeded by	Rich Coleman
In office April 9, 2010 – May 4, 2010
Preceded by	Kash Heed
Succeeded by	Kash Heed
Attorney General
In office June 10, 2009 – December 1, 2010
Premier	Gordon Campbell
Preceded by	Wally Oppal
Succeeded by	Barry Penner
Minister of Aboriginal Relations and Reconciliation
In office August 15, 2006 – June 10, 2009
Premier	Gordon Campbell
Preceded by	Tom Christensen
Succeeded by	George Abbott
Minister of Labour and Citizens' Services
In office June 16, 2005 – August 15, 2006
Premier	Gordon Campbell
Preceded by	Graham Bruce
Succeeded by	Olga Ilich
Minister of Forests
In office June 5, 2001 – June 16, 2005
Premier	Gordon Campbell
Preceded by	Gordon Wilson
Succeeded by	Rich Coleman

Personal details
- Born: Michael de Jong; 1963 or 1964 (age 62–63)
- Party: Independent (federal, since 2025); BC United (provincial) (Note: Known as the British Columbia Liberal Party until April 2023.)
- Other political affiliations: Conservative (federal, until 2025)
- Education: Carleton University (B.A.); University of Alberta Faculty of Law (LL.B.)
- Profession: lawyer

Michael de Jong KC (born 1963 or 1964) is a politician in the Canadian province of British Columbia. He was a member of the Legislative Assembly (MLA) of British Columbia, representing the electoral district of Matsqui from 1994 to 2001, Abbotsford-Mount Lehman from 2001 to 2009, and Abbotsford West from 2009 until 2024. A caucus member of BC United (formerly known as the British Columbia Liberal Party), he served in several cabinet posts under premiers Gordon Campbell and Christy Clark, and ran for party leadership in 2011 and 2018.

== Early life ==
De Jong was born to Dutch parents who immigrated to Canada after Canadian soldiers liberated the Netherlands in World War II. At age eight, he and his family moved to a farm in the District of Matsqui in British Columbia. He attended Abbotsford's last single-room elementary school and worked as a farm labourer as an early teen.

He graduated from Carleton University in Ottawa with a Bachelor of Arts degree, then attended the University of Alberta Faculty of Law, earning his law degree in 1988. He subsequently returned to Matsqui to set up a law practice, and was elected as trustee for School District 34 Abbotsford at age 26, becoming one of Canada's youngest school board members.

== Political career ==
=== Provincial politics ===
==== Early career and opposition ====
In 1994, de Jong was recruited by Gordon Campbell of the British Columbia Liberal Party to compete against new Social Credit Party (Socred) leader Grace McCarthy in a by-election in Matsqui. The Socreds had represented the riding for 42 years until de Jong defeated McCarthy by a margin of 42 votes. McCarthy, who had been attempting to rebuild the Socreds, resigned as party leader shortly after her by-election loss, and the party failed to elect any members in the subsequent provincial election in 1996.

De Jong was a member of the Official Opposition between 1994 and 2001, serving as opposition critic for aboriginal affairs at one point. He was regarded as very vocal on the opposition benches; he was ejected from the legislative assembly for calling then-Attorney General Colin Gabelmann a "liar" and was later sued for libel by federal cabinet minister Herb Dhaliwal.

==== Campbell ministry ====
In the 2001 election, de Jong ran in the new riding of Abbotsford-Mount Lehman. After his party was victorious in the election, de Jong was appointed Minister of Forests in the new Campbell ministry. In 2004, de Jong removed 70,000 hectares of land from Tree Farm Licence 44 with no compensation from the owner and against the recommendations of ministry staff; this effectively privatized what had been Crown Land without compensation to the province. The changes made allowed the wood to be exported as raw logs rather than lumber, and also allowed for eventual development of the land. The land in question was under dispute by the Hupacasath First Nation and also the Tseshaht First Nation; no consultation took place and the bands had since filed legal action. He has also been linked to other such privatizations of Crown forest land. After the 2005 election, de Jong became Minister of Labour and Citizens' Services. The following year, in a small cabinet shuffle, he became Minister of Aboriginal Affairs and Reconciliation.

In the 2009 election, de Jong ran in the newly created riding of Abbotsford West. Following the election, in which the BC Liberals remained in office, de Jong was named Attorney General. On two occasions in 2010, de Jong stepped in as Minister of Public Safety and Solicitor General while Kash Heed was under investigation for campaign violations. That same year, de Jong faced controversy when he approved the payment of $6 million in legal fees for Liberal Party insiders David Basi and Robert Virk, who pleaded guilty to charges of breach of trust and accepting benefits in connection with the sale of BC Rail in 2003. De Jong defended his actions saying the government's Legal Services Branch had recommended they not try to collect the funds since the aides did not have any money.

On December 1, 2010, de Jong announced that he would seek the leadership of the BC Liberal Party to replace the outgoing Gordon Campbell, and resigned his cabinet post. During his campaign, he advocated for the provincial voting age to be lowered to 16. He placed fourth in the 2011 leadership election, which was won by Christy Clark.

==== Clark ministry ====
In Clark's initial cabinet, de Jong was named Minister of Health. He was appointed Minister of Finance on September 5, 2012, and in addition briefly served as Minister Responsible for Multiculturalism between March and June 2013. He retained the finance portfolio following his re-election in 2013. From 2013 to 2017, de Jong tabled five consecutive balanced budgets.

De Jong was re-elected in 2017 and remained as Minister of Finance. He finished his term as minister that July, following the Liberal minority government's defeat in a confidence vote on June 29.

==== Return to opposition ====
With Christy Clark resigning as leader, de Jong announced on September 26, 2017 his intention to run in the 2018 BC Liberal leadership election. His campaign placed an emphasis on education, including proposals to extend full-day kindergarten to four-year-olds, and to provide $500 each year to a child's registered education savings plan. On January 18, 2018, de Jong and rival candidate Andrew Wilkinson announced they had struck a deal to support each other as their second-ballot choices. De Jong placed fifth in a field of six, but his alliance with Wilkinson was critical to the latter's victory.

He was re-elected in 2020, and was named shadow minister for Attorney General. He announced in February 2024 that he would not seek another term as MLA in that year's provincial election, and stated that he was considering running for the Conservative Party of Canada in the next federal election. His provincial seat was held by the Conservatives by Korky Neufeld.

=== Federal politics ===
On April 17, 2024, de Jong announced he was seeking the Conservative nomination for Abbotsford—South Langley. On March 4, 2025, de Jong revealed on social media that despite the local Electoral District Candidate Selection Committee unanimously endorsing his candidacy, the party denied his application to seek the nomination by telling him that he was "not qualified". De Jong later announced that he was running as an independent by stating his belief that candidates should not be selected by a party operative. The Globe and Mail later reported that the Conservative candidate, 25 year-old blueberry farmer Sukhman Singh Gill, was selected by Jenni Byrne. On April 15, 2025, Ed Fast, the outgoing Conservative MP for Abbotsford, the predecessor district of Abbotsford—South Langley, endorsed de Jong. Gill was elected in the election.

At the time of the 2025 Canadian federal election, he lived in Abbotsford.

== Electoral record ==
=== Federal elections ===
2025 Canadian federal election: Abbotsford—South Langley
Party	Candidate	Votes	%	±%	Expenditures
Conservative	Sukhman Gill	24,116	43.09	–2.50	$108,598.71
Liberal	Kevin Gillies	18,969	33.89	+7.84	$30,957.64
Independent	Michael de Jong	9,747	17.41	–	$124,889.87
New Democratic	Dharmasena Yakandawela	2,104	3.76	–14.46	$166.20
Green	Melissa Snazell	577	1.03	–2.11	none listed
People's	Aeriol Alderking	459	0.82	–6.18	$1,359.95
Total valid votes/expense limit		55,972	99.21	–	$129,777.97
Total rejected ballots		445	0.79	–	
Turnout		56,417	66.74	–	
Eligible voters		84,536			
Conservative notional hold		Swing		−5.17	
Source: Elections Canada

=== Provincial elections ===
2020 British Columbia general election: Abbotsford West
Party	Candidate	Votes	%	±%	Expenditures
Liberal	Mike de Jong	8,880	45.51	−9.72	$46,271.14
New Democratic	Preet Rai	7,119	36.49	+5.72	$5,639.35
Conservative	Michael Henshall	1,766	9.05	–	$7,727.07
Green	Kevin Eastwood	1,671	8.56	−2.28	$330.52
Vision	Sukhi Gill	75	0.38	–	$2,685.00
Total valid votes		19,511	100.00	–	
Total rejected ballots					
Turnout					
Registered voters					
Source: Elections BC

2017 British Columbia general election: Abbotsford West
Party	Candidate	Votes	%	±%	Expenditures
Liberal	Mike de Jong	11,618	55.23	+4.85	$71,415
New Democratic	Preet Rai	6,474	30.77	+1.36	$23,646
Green	Kevin Allan Eastwood	2,280	10.84	+6.18	$306
Christian Heritage	Lynn Simcox	516	2.45	–	$1,221
Libertarian	Dave Sharkey	149	0.71	–	
Total valid votes		21,037	100.00		
Total rejected ballots		148	0.70		
Turnout		21,185	57.30		
Source: Elections BC

2013 British Columbia general election: Abbotsford West
Party	Candidate	Votes	%
Liberal	Mike de Jong	9,473	50.38
New Democratic	Sukhi Dhami	5,430	29.41
Conservative	Paul Brian Redekopp	1,791	9.53
Independent	Moe Gill	1,082	5.75
Green	Stephen Carl OShea	877	4.66
Excalibur	Kerry-Lynn Osbourne	49	0.26
Total valid votes		18.702	100.00
Total rejected ballots		245	1.29
Turnout		18,947	59.38
Registered voters		31,910	
Source: Elections BC
