= Standing committee (Canada) =

In Canada, permanent government committee established by Standing Orders

In Canada, a standing committee is a permanent committee established by Standing Orders in the House of Commons or the Senate. It may study matters referred to it by special order or, within its area of responsibility in the Standing Orders, and may undertake studies on its own initiative. There are currently 25 standing committees and two standing joint committees in the House of Commons and 17 in the Senate, many with particular responsibilities to examine the administration, policy development, and budgetary estimates of certain government departments and agencies. Certain standing committees are also given mandates to examine matters that have government-wide implications (e.g. official languages policy, multiculturalism policy) or that may not relate to a particular department (e.g. procedure of the House of Commons).

House of Commons	Joint	Senate
Access to Information, Privacy and Ethics; Agriculture and Agri-Food; Canadian Heritage; Citizenship and Immigration; Environment and Sustainable Development; Finance; Fisheries and Oceans; Foreign Affairs and International Development; Government Operations and Estimates; Health; Human Resources, Skills and Social Development and the Status of Persons with Disabilities; Indigenous and Northern Affairs; Industry, Science and Technology; International Trade; Justice and Human Rights; National Defence; Natural Resources; Official Languages; Procedure and House Affairs; Public Accounts; Public Safety and National Security; Status of Women; Transport, Infrastructure and Communities; Veterans Affairs	Exercise of Powers Under the Building Canada Act; Library of Parliament; Scrutiny of Regulations	Aboriginal Peoples; Agriculture and Forestry; Banking, Trade, and Commerce; Ethics and Conflict of Interest for Senators; Energy, the Environment and Natural Resources; Fisheries and Oceans; Foreign Affairs and International Trade; Human Rights; Internal Economy, Budgets, and Administration; Diversity subcommittee; Human Resources subcommittee; Senate Estimates subcommittee; Legal and Constitutional Affairs; National Finance; National Security and Defence; Official Languages; Rules, Procedure and the Rights of Parliament; Selection Committee; Social Affairs, Science and Technology; Transport and Communication

== See also ==
- Standing committee
