= Doug Black =

Canadian politician

The Honourable Doug Black KC
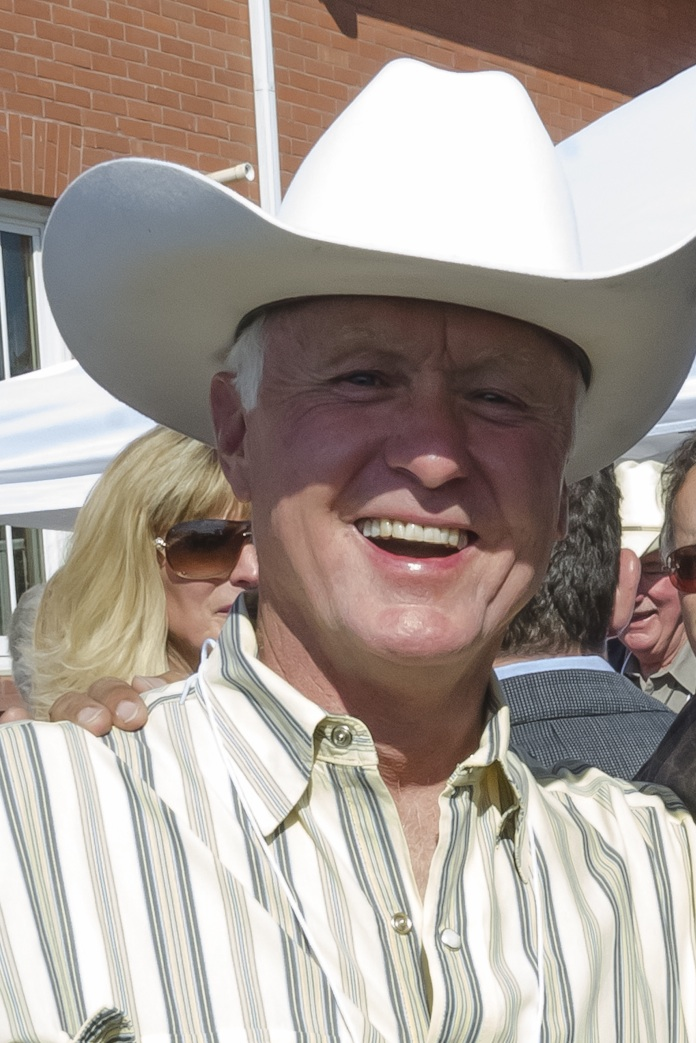
- Black in 2013

Canadian Senator from Alberta
- In office January 25, 2013 – October 31, 2021
- Nominated by: Stephen Harper
- Appointed by: David Johnston

Personal details
- Born: Douglas John Black; May 10, 1952 (age 74) Calgary, Alberta, Canada
- Party: Canadian Senators Group
- Other political affiliations: Independent Senators Group (2017–2019); Conservative Party of Canada (2013–2016); Progressive Conservative Association of Alberta (2012)
- Education: Dalhousie University (LLB)

Douglas John Black KC (born May 10, 1952) is a lawyer and former Canadian senator and from Alberta, Canada. He was appointed to the Senate on Prime Minister Stephen Harper's advice on January 25, 2013, having won a Senate nominee election in 2012. He resigned from the Senate on October 31, 2021, in order to return to private life.

== Early life and education ==
Black was born and raised in Calgary, Alberta. In 1970, he graduated from Ernest Manning High School in Calgary. He attended the University of Alberta, where he was actively involved in student government, and in 1975, graduated from Dalhousie University with a Bachelor of Laws. He was called to the Newfoundland Bar in 1977 and the Alberta Bar in 1994.

== Career ==
Black is a senior counselor for Dentons Canada LLP. His legal expertise is in corporate, commercial and energy law. He is former chairman of the board of the Michaëlle Jean Foundation and was founder of the Lake Crest Independent School in St. John's, Newfoundland and Labrador. He is Governor-Emeritus of the Banff Centre, where he was National Co-chair of the centre's successful $130 million campus revitalization campaign.

Black has been a proponent for responsible energy development and an advocate for diversifying Canada's energy markets. He was founding president of the Energy Policy Institute of Canada, a not-for-profit, non-partisan organization dedicated to the development of a Canadian energy framework.

In August 2012, Black was named as one of Canada's 25 most influential lawyers for 2012 by Canadian Lawyer Magazine.

== Senate election ==
Black ran as one of three Progressive Conservative senate nominees in the 2012 Alberta Senate nominee election. He finished first out of thirteen candidates in the province-wide vote, taking 428,791 votes. He was appointed to the Senate on January 25, 2013, and sat as a Conservative until July 2016, when he changed his designation to Independent. He subsequently joined the Independent Senators Group and, on November 4, 2019, he joined the Canadian Senators Group.

Black sat on the Senate Committees on Transport and Communications; and serves as chair on the Senate Committee on Banking, Trade and Commerce.

== Awards ==
He was appointed Queen's Counsel in 2002 and was awarded the Alberta Centennial Medal in December 2005 for community leadership. Black has also received the designation of ICD.D from the Institute of Corporate Directors.

== University of Calgary ==
Prior to being appointed to the Senate of Canada, Black served as chair of the Board of Governors at the University of Calgary. In August 2012, he repaid $5,343.86 not covered by the University of Calgary expense policy. Black's total expenses were $28,030.88 over 18 months. Black stepped down from the Board and his roles in several other organizations prior to taking up his duties in the Senate.

== Election results ==
=== 2012 Alberta Senate nominee election ===
Candidate	Party	Votes #	Votes %	Ballots %	Elected	Appointed	1st	2nd	3rd
Doug Black	Progressive Conservative	427,745	15.90%	38.95%	✓	January 25, 2013	68/87	8/87	3/87
Scott Tannas	Progressive Conservative	351,761	13.07%	32.04%	✓	March 25, 2013	2/87	46/87	14/87
Mike Shaikh	Progressive Conservative	309,587	11.51%	28.19%	✓		2/87	9/87	31/87
Rob Gregory	Wildrose	300,883	11.18%	27.40%			8/87	10/87	18/87
Raymond Germain	Wildrose	299,800	11.14%	27.30%			5/87	13/87	13/87
Vitor Marciano	Wildrose	246,787	9.17%	22.47%			0/87	0/87	6/87
Elizabeth Johannson	EverGreen	149,844	5.57%	13.65%			1/87	1/87	1/87
Len Bracko	Independent	141,830	5.27%	12.92%			1/87	0/87	0/87
David Fletcher	Independent	114,940	4.27%	10.47%			0/87	0/87	0/87
Ian Urquhart	Independent	107,397	3.99%	9.78%			0/87	0/87	1/87
Paul Frank	Independent	93,586	3.48%	8.52%			0/87	0/87	0/87
William Exelby	Independent	81,476	3.03%	7.42%			0/87	0/87	0/87
Perry Chahal	Independent	65,164	2.42%	5.93%			0/87	0/87	0/87
Total		2,690,800		1,098,021					
Rejected, Spoiled and Declined		189,059							
Total Ballots Cast		1,287,080							
