= Korky Neufeld =

Canadian politician

The Honourable Korky Neufeld MLA

Member of the British Columbia Legislative Assembly for Abbotsford West
- Incumbent
- Assumed office October 19, 2024
- Preceded by: Mike de Jong

Minister of Post-Secondary Education and Labour
- Incumbent
- Assumed office November 20, 2026
- Preceded by: Jessie Sunner

Personal details
- Party: BC Conservatives

Kornelius "Korky" Neufeld MLA is a Canadian politician who has served as a member of the Legislative Assembly of British Columbia (MLA) representing the electoral district of Abbotsford West since 2024. He is a member of the Conservative Party.

== Early life and career ==
Neufeld was born into a family of 10 children. His parents, originally from South America, immigrated to Canada in 1964. As of 2024, he resides in Abbotsford, British Columbia with his wife, Cynthia, his four children, and two grandchildren.

Neufeld began his career in church ministry as a pastor in Vancouver before leading a church in Abbotsford for more than ten years. He later worked in the construction industry, including as a construction manager for Servicemaster Restore of the Fraser Valley.

Neufeld has been involved with various community organizations and advisory committees. He served with the Abbotsford Restorative Justice and Advocacy Association for over five years, the Bridgehouse Committee at City Hall for two years, and the Abbotsford Christian Leaders Network for ten years.

== Political career ==
=== Abbotsford Board of Education ===
Neufeld has served five terms as a trustee on the Abbotsford School District Board of Education. As of 2024, he had held this role for 15 years. During his tenure, he served as both Chair and Vice-Chair of the board.

Neufeld also represented Abbotsford at the BC School Trustees Association (BCSTA), a provincial organization comprising 60 boards and over 350 elected trustees. He served two terms as one of seven representatives on the BCSTA's provincial board.

=== 2024 provincial election ===
In February 2024, Neufeld was nominated as the Conservative Party of BC's candidate for Abbotsford West. In October 2024, he was elected with 58.35% of the vote, defeating BC NDP candidate Graeme Hutchison.

Following his election, Neufeld was appointed to the official opposition's shadow cabinet as critic for post-secondary education. His stated policy priorities include education policy changes, healthcare system reform, and economic policies aimed at lowering taxes and supporting small and medium-sized businesses.

== Controversies ==
Neufeld publicly campaigned to repeal SOGI 123 (the provinces sexual orientation and gender identity optional resources and policies designed to reduce bullying and support human rights standards) as a B.C. Conservative candidate and MLA. In 2023 he responded to protests in Abbostford, B.C. by clarifying that SOGI 123 isn't actually curriculum, it's a set of optional learning resources for educators.

Korky Neufeld sometimes gets confused with former Chilliwack school trustee Barry Neufeld who was involved in a B.C. Human Rights Tribunal complaint on the same topic, and later (unsuccessfully) attempted to sue the BCTF for defamation.

== Electoral record ==
2026 British Columbia general election: Abbotsford West
Party	Candidate	Votes	%	±%	Expenditures
Conservative	Korky Neufeld	10,552	60.91		
New Democratic	Jules Côté	5,028	29.02		
CentreBC	Gurpreet Chahal	1,680	9.70	—	
Total valid votes		17,260	99.64		
Total rejected ballots		63	0.36		
Turnout		17,323			
Registered voters					
Conservative hold		Swing		+5.75	
Source: Elections BC

2024 British Columbia general election: Abbotsford West
Party	Candidate	Votes	%	±%	Expenditures
Conservative	Korky Neufeld	11,483	58.35	+49.6	$37,532.61
New Democratic	Graeme Hutchison	7,255	36.87	−0.3	$9,684.73
Independent	James Davison	940	4.78	–	$8,078.81
Total valid votes/expenses limit		19,678	99.76	–	$71,700.08
Total rejected ballots		47	0.24	–	
Turnout		19,725	52.14	–	
Registered voters		37,833			
Conservative notional gain from BC United		Swing		N/A (Note: Swing cannot be calculated as BC United did not run a candidate in this riding.)	
Source: Elections BC

== See also ==
- 43rd Parliament of British Columbia
