= Adam Dodek =

Canadian legal scholar

Adam Dodek is a Full Professor at the University of Ottawa Faculty of Law. His research focuses on public law, constitutional law, legal ethics, and the legal profession. Dodek also serves as Chair of the Board of Directors for CanLII.

== Education and early career ==
Dodek completed his undergraduate education at McGill University and then attended Harvard Law School.

After completing law school, Dodek received a Fulbright Scholarship to research Israeli constitutional law while clerking at the Supreme Court of Israel. He was called to the bar in California, practiced in San Francisco, and then clerked for the US Court of Appeals for the Ninth Circuit. He then returned to Canada and clerked for Justice Claire L'Heureux-Dubé at the Supreme Court of Canada.

Following his clerkship at the Supreme Court of Canada, Dodek worked at Borden Ladner Gervais and later served as the Chief of Staff for the Attorney General of Ontario.

== Research and teaching ==
Dodek joined the University of Ottawa Faculty of Law in 2008. He served as Vice Dean of Research from 2012 to 2014, and as Dean of the Common Law Section from 2018 to 2021. He is currently a Full Professor at the law school.

Dodek has taught courses in public law, legal ethics, professional responsibility, torts, and a seminar on the Supreme Court of Canada. In 2012 he was awarded the Capital Educators Award as one of Ottawa's top teachers.

Dodek is the author of more than 50 articles and book chapters. His books include The Canadian Constitution, 3rd Edition (2024) and Solicitor-Client Privilege (2014), which won the Walter Owen Book Prize in 2015.
