= Holocytochrome-c synthase =

holocytochrome-c synthase
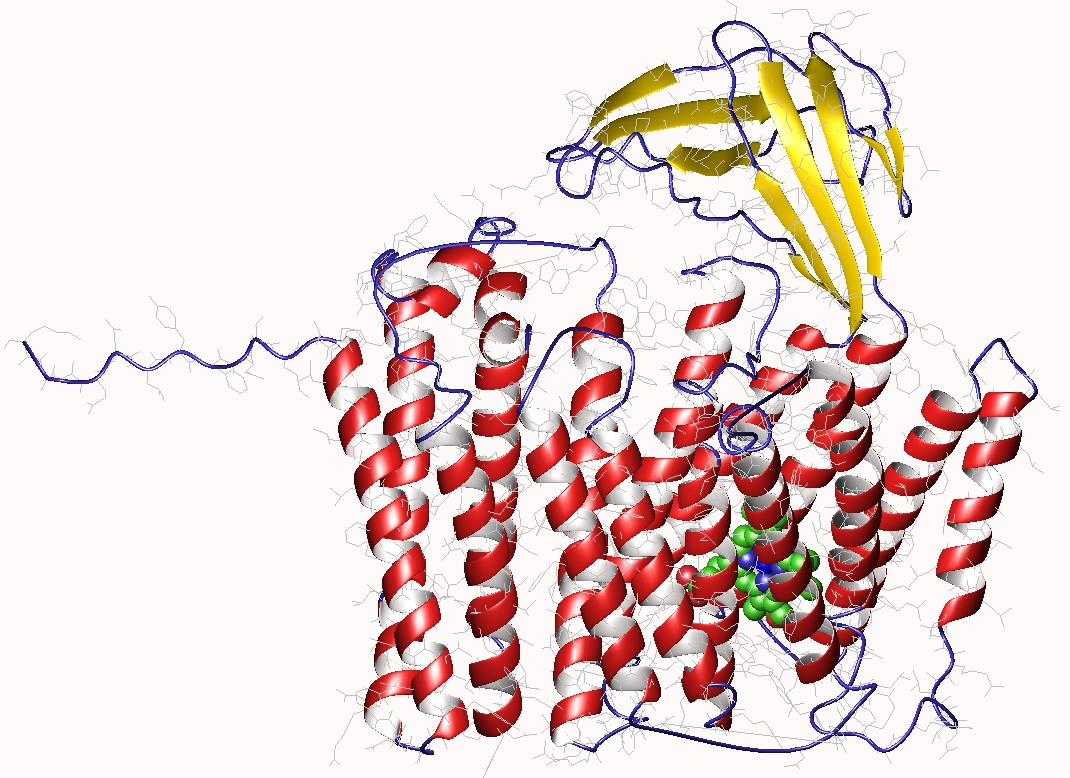
- Holocytochrome-c synthase monomer, Thermus thermophilus

Identifiers
- EC no.: 4.4.1.17
- CAS no.: 75139-03-6

Databases
- IntEnz: IntEnz view
- BRENDA: BRENDA entry
- ExPASy: NiceZyme view
- KEGG: KEGG entry
- MetaCyc: metabolic pathway
- PRIAM: profile
- PDB structures: RCSB PDB PDBe PDBsum
- Gene Ontology: AmiGO / QuickGO
Search
- PMC: articles
- PubMed: articles
- NCBI: proteins

Cytochrome c/c1 heme lyase

Identifiers
- Symbol: Cyto_heme_lyase
- Pfam: PF01265
- InterPro: IPR000511
- PROSITE: PDOC00647
Available protein structures:
- Pfam: structures / ECOD
- PDB: RCSB PDB; PDBe; PDBj
- PDBsum: structure summary

The enzyme holocytochrome-c synthase (EC 4.4.1.17) catalyzes the chemical reaction

holocytochrome c $\rightleftharpoons$ apocytochrome c + heme

This enzyme belongs to the family of lyases, specifically the class of carbon-sulfur lyases. The systematic name of this enzyme class is holocytochrome-c apocytochrome-c-lyase (heme-forming). Other names in common use include cytochrome c heme-lyase, holocytochrome c synthetase, and holocytochrome-c apocytochrome-c-lyase. This enzyme participates in porphyrin and chlorophyll metabolism.

Cytochrome c heme-lyase (CCHL) and cytochrome Cc1 heme-lyase (CC1HL) are mitochondrial enzymes that catalyze the covalent attachment of a heme group on two cysteine residues of cytochrome c and c1. These two enzymes are functionally and evolutionary related. There are two conserved regions, the first is located in the central section and the second in the C-terminal section. Both patterns contain conserved histidine, tryptophan and acidic residues which could be important for the interaction of the enzymes with the apoproteins and/or the heme group.

The human enzyme, HCCS, processes both cytochromes c and c1.
