= Sukhman Gill =

Canadian politician

Sukhman Gill MP

Member of Parliament for Abbotsford—South Langley
- Incumbent
- Assumed office April 28, 2025
- Preceded by: Riding established

Personal details
- Born: 1998 or 1999 (age 26–27)
- Party: Conservative

Sukhman Singh Gill MP (born 1998 or 1999) is a Canadian politician who has served as a member of Parliament for Abbotsford—South Langley since 2025. A member of the Conservative Party, he was elected in the 2025 federal election after a contentious process for the Conservative nomination with Mike de Jong. He is a local farmer, being raised on a farm near Abbotsford. He is of Indian heritage, with his family originating from Bukanwala village near Moga, India.

At the time of the 2025 Canadian federal election, he lived in Langley.

== Electoral record ==
2025 Canadian federal election: Abbotsford—South Langley
| Party | Candidate | Votes | % | ±% | Expenditures |
|---|---|---|---|---|---|
| Conservative | Sukhman Gill | 24,116 | 43.09 | −2.50 | |
| Liberal | Kevin Gillies | 18,969 | 33.89 | +7.84 | |
| Independent | Michael de Jong | 9,747 | 17.41 | | |
| New Democratic | Dharmasena Yakandawela | 2,104 | 3.76 | −14.46 | |
| Green | Melissa Snazell | 577 | 1.03 | −2.11 | |
| People's | Aeriol Alderking | 459 | 0.82 | −6.18 | |
| Total valid votes/expense limit | | 55,972 | 99.21 | | |
| Total rejected ballots | | 445 | 0.79 | | |
| Turnout | | 56,417 | 67.33 | | |
| Eligible voters | | 83,787 | | | |
| Conservative notional hold | | Swing | | −5.17 | |
Source: Elections Canada
Note: number of eligible voters does not include voting day registrations.
