= Abbotsford—South Langley =

Federal electoral district in British Columbia, Canada

British Columbia electoral district
- Interactive map of riding boundaries from the 2025 federal election

Federal electoral district
- Legislature: House of Commons
MP
Sukhman Gill
Conservative
- District created: 2023
- First contested: 2025
- Last contested: 2025
- District webpage: profile, map

Demographics
- Population (2021): 116,265
- Electors (2025): 83,068
- Area (km²): 233
- Pop. density (per km²): 499
- Census division(s): Fraser Valley, Metro Vancouver
- Census subdivision(s): Abbotsford (part), Langley (part), Matsqui

Abbotsford—South Langley (French: Abbotsford—Langley-Sud) is a federal electoral district in British Columbia, Canada. It came into effect upon the call of the 2025 Canadian federal election.

== Geography ==
Under the 2022 Canadian federal electoral redistribution the riding will be created out of Abbotsford.

== Demographics ==
According to the 2021 Canadian census

Languages: 69.8% English, 17.2% Punjabi, 2.0% German, 1.1% French, 1.1% Vietnamese

Religions: 38.4% No religion, 37.2% Christian (7.7% Catholic, 2.3% Anabaptist, 2.2% United Church, 2.1% Anglican, 1.5% Pentecostal, 1.4% Baptist, 20.1% Other), 19.2% Sikh, 1.9% Hindu, 1.3% Muslim, 1.0% Buddhist

Median income: $37,600 (2020)

Average income: $47,920 (2020)

Panethnic groups in Abbotsford—South Langley (2021)
Panethnic group	2021	
Panethnic group	Pop.	%
European (Note: Statistic includes all persons that did not make up part of a visible minority or an indigenous identity.)	69,685	61.27%
South Asian	26,030	22.89%
Indigenous	5,795	5.1%
Southeast Asian (Note: Statistic includes total responses of "Filipino" and "Southeast Asian" under visible minority section on census.)	4,235	3.72%
East Asian (Note: Statistic includes total responses of "Chinese", "Korean", and "Japanese" under visible minority section on census.)	3,085	2.71%
African	1,700	1.49%
Latin American	1,100	0.97%
Middle Eastern (Note: Statistic includes total responses of "West Asian" and "Arab" under visible minority section on census.)	985	0.87%
Other/multiracial (Note: Statistic includes total responses of "Visible minority, n.i.e." and "Multiple visible minorities" under visible minority section on census.)	1,105	0.97%
Total responses	113,730	100%
Total population	116,385	100%
Notes: Totals greater than 100% due to multiple origin responses. Demographics based on 2022 Canadian federal electoral redistribution riding boundaries.

== History ==
Parliament	Years	Member	Party
Abbotsford—South Langley; Riding created from Abbotsford and Langley—Aldergrove
45th	2025–present	Sukhman Gill	Conservative

== Electoral results ==
2025 Canadian federal election
Party	Candidate	Votes	%	±%	Expenditures
Conservative	Sukhman Gill	24,116	43.09	−2.50	
Liberal	Kevin Gillies	18,969	33.89	+7.84	
Independent	Michael de Jong	9,747	17.41		
New Democratic	Dharmasena Yakandawela	2,104	3.76	−14.46	
Green	Melissa Snazell	577	1.03	−2.11	
People's	Aeriol Alderking	459	0.82	−6.18	
Total valid votes/expense limit		55,972	99.21		
Total rejected ballots		445	0.79		
Turnout		56,417	67.33		
Eligible voters		83,787			
Conservative notional hold		Swing		−5.17	
Source: Elections Canada
Note: number of eligible voters does not include voting day registrations.

2021 federal election redistributed results
Party	Vote	%
Conservative	21,838	45.59
Liberal	12,478	26.05
New Democratic	8,729	18.22
People's	3,354	7.00
Green	1,504	3.14
