= Certified health executive =

Canadian certification

Certified health executive (CHE)
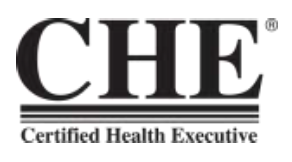
- Company type: Professional Designation
- Industry: Healthcare
- Founded: 1984
- Headquarters: Canada

A certified health executive (CHE) is a person who has met the requirements established by the Canadian College of Health Leaders (CCHL). The certification program began in 1984. It is to provide a Canadian credential that recognizes effective leadership in Canadian health services. The CHE Program is a capabilities-based certification program, developed collaboratively with college members, staff, and board. In 2013, the CHE program was revised to align with the LEADS in a Caring Environment framework. Given the constant changes within the Canadian health system, all elements of the CHE Program are regularly reviewed and revised by the CHE program committee and the professional standard council.

== Eligibility ==
To be eligible to apply for the CHE Program a person needs to be a member of the college in good standing and must fulfill one of the two requirements below:

- Hold a Master's degree (copies of degrees, diplomas, certificates, etc. required) with a minimum of two consecutive years' experience in Canadian health leadership within the last three years
- Hold a Baccalaureate degree (copies of degrees, diplomas, certificates, etc. required) with a minimum of five consecutive years' experience in Canadian health leadership within the last seven years and be able to demonstrate progressive and cumulative educational/ professional advancement in health leadership by applying for a prior learning assessment recognition (PLAR)

== Criteria ==
In order to receive their CHE designation:

1. Application process
2. LEADS online self-assessment
3. Career development plan
4. Online exam
5. LEADS in Action Project
6. Participant program evaluation

== Program Overview ==
LEADS Online Self-Assessment

The LEADS Online Self-Assessment helps individuals at all levels of leadership to better understand their skills and behaviors with respect to the LEADS framework.

=== Career Development Plan ===
Health leaders bring a different set of foundational capabilities and needs to their career development. This involves the development of a learning plan to help personalize their professional growth within a well-established framework; reflecting on their leadership experience and feedback, translating these insights into action, and involving their manager/director in the process (where applicable). It also serves as an ongoing reference point for the CHE candidate, clarifying their expectations for acceptable progress.

=== Exam ===
Candidates must write the online exam within 6 months of completing and submitting the Career Development Plan. Candidates not writing the exam within the 6-month timeframe will be required to pay an administration fee to extend the deadline. The online CHE exam is a duration of three hours and questions focus on health system issues across the continuum of care and across a variety of health sectors. It is composed of multiple choice and short answer questions. The questions are aligned with the five domains of the LEADS in a Caring Environment framework. These domains are: (1) Lead Self; (2) Engage Others; (3) Achieve Results; (4) Develop Coalitions; (5) Systems Transformation.

=== LEADS in Action Project ===
The LEADS in Action Project is relevant to the context and practicability of health leader's environments. It is flexible, enabling candidates to work on case studies either by choosing a predetermined topic or by focusing on an area of experience and/or interest from their workplace. Candidates are given two options on how to complete this part of the CHE Program.

Option 1: Candidates may have interest in working with one of the selected case studies which profile issues within national and international organizations.

Option 2: Candidates may have a recent health leadership issue in the workplace that they have been asked to analyze – prospectively or retrospectively.

Whichever route is chosen, candidates will demonstrate leadership capability through summarizing findings in a Briefing Note. Through the Briefing Note, candidates will identify, analyze and recommend the decisions to be made, or what decisions need to be made to resolve the issue. LEADS in Action projects submitted later than March 1 of any year may not be processed in time to permit the candidate to convocate in the same year.

=== Candidate's Evaluation of the CHE Program ===
This element measures the relevance of the CHE Program to the expectations of the individual CHE candidate. Each candidate is asked to evaluate all program elements, including the link with the LEADS in a Caring Environment framework. Candidates’ evaluations are a formal part of the quality improvement review process for the CHE Program.

== Certification Maintenance ==
As a certified member you have two obligations in order to maintain your CHE designation:

1. Continue to be a member in good standing with the College. Only members of the College in good standing may use the CHE (Certified Health Executive) designation. If College membership is discontinued the CHE designation will be revoked.
2. Obtain the necessary Maintenance of Certification (MOC) credits, as per the College policy and guidelines. The College has long seen Maintenance of Certification (MOC) as an integral part of the certification process. It is an activity through which Certified Health Executives and Fellows demonstrate their commitment to lifelong learning and to remaining current in their chosen profession. The College will grant 7 MOC category 1 credits to candidates upon successfully completion the CHE Program.

The approach for the MOC credits element is individualized and designed to provide a foundation for lifelong learning and a link to ongoing MOC and the College Fellowship Program. Foremost among possible MOC activities are the professional development opportunities presented by the College and its chapters, which have been specifically designed to meet the needs of health leaders.
