= Scott Tannas =

Canadian politician (born 1962)

The Honourable Scott Tannas

Leader of the Canadian Senators Group
- Incumbent
- Assumed office November 4, 2019
- Deputy: Dennis Patterson; Rebecca Patterson
- Preceded by: Position established

Canadian Senator from Alberta
- Incumbent
- Assumed office March 25, 2013
- Nominated by: Stephen Harper
- Appointed by: David Johnston

Personal details
- Born: February 25, 1962 (age 64) High River, Alberta, Canada
- Party: Canadian Senators Group (since 2019)
- Other political affiliations: Conservative Party of Canada (2013–2019); Progressive Conservative Association of Alberta (2012)
- Spouse: Taryn McCormick
- Children: 4
- Profession: Finance executive

Scott Alfred Tannas (born February 25, 1962) is a Canadian politician and finance executive. He was appointed to the Senate of Canada and, since November 5, 2019, leader of the Canadian Senators Group, a parliamentary caucus.

Tannas is the former president and CEO and founder of Western Financial Group (formerly Hi-Alta Capital Inc.), an insurance brokerage, life insurance and banking company headquartered in High River, Alberta, Canada. Tannas was elected as a senator-in-waiting in the 2012 Alberta Senate nominee election, and appointed to the Senate following the retirement of Senator Bert Brown on March 22, 2013.

Outside of politics, Tannas runs the Alberta-based Western Investment Company of Canada, a private equity firm.

== Early life and education ==
Tannas was born in High River, Alberta, Canada on February 25, 1962. He is the son of Donald Tannas, a school teacher/principal and Member of the Legislative Assembly of Alberta, serving as Deputy Speaker and Christine Tannas, a nurse.

Tannas has spent the majority of his life in High River, except for a 2-year period, where his parents served with the Canadian International Development Agency in Uganda.

Tannas attended and graduated from École Senator Riley School in 1979. Tannas also worked the local dance club scene as a DJ and was known for his sound system and light show. At the age of 26, Tannas got a job in the tourism industry working at the Banff Springs Hotel.

Tannas attended both Mount Royal College (now called Mount Royal University), and the University of Calgary. While attending university, Tannas met Taryn McCormick, the daughter of Michael James Sr and Gweneth Helen McCormick, whose family started the Riley & McCormick Western Wear family in 1901.

== Businesses and career ==
After leaving college, Tannas stayed in the Calgary and Banff area working in the tourism industry and taking side jobs to build up capital. Tannas had accumulated enough capital to move back to his hometown of High River and purchased Hi-Alta Agencies, an established insurance firm in town, which had been operating since 1905.

In May 1996, Hi-Alta changed its name to Western Financial Group to allow for expansion outside of Alberta. In 2001, Western Financial Group's insurance division, WFG Agency Network Inc., became the largest insurance broker network in western Canada. That same year, Tannas started The Western Communities Foundation, a non-profit organization created to support the communities in which Western Financial Group operates. In January 2003, Tannas, along with the board of directors at Western Financial Group, created their own bank: Bank West, which took in over $1 million in deposits in its first day of business. In 2003, Tannas was awarded Ernst and Young's Prairies Entrepreneur of the Year for Professional/Financial Services.

As of 2021, Tannas runs the Western Investment Company of Canada while serving as a senator. He is also an honorary board member of SOS Children's Villages - Canada.

== Political career ==
Tannas' first venture into politics was when he served as campaign manager for Ken Hughes, the Progressive Conservative MP for Macleod, in the 1993 federal election.

In 2012, Tannas stood as a candidate in Alberta's Senate nominee election, as a Progressive Conservative. He placed second out of three available positions, and was named a "senator-in-waiting". Following the retirement of Senator Bert Brown, Tannas was appointed to the Senate of Canada on March 22, 2013. On his appointment, Prime Minister Stephen Harper said that Tannas was supportive of the government's efforts at Senate reform, including imposing term limits on senators. In 2017, Tannas said he intended to serve no more than ten years in the Senate: "For me and only me…I think hanging around longer than 10 years, I’m not going to add any more value."

On November 4, 2019, Tannas became one of eleven senators who founded the Canadian Senators Group, a non-partisan parliamentary group in the Senate. At the same time, the CSG selected Senator Tannas as its interim leader.By late 2020, Tannas became the CSG's full-time leader.

Over the 2020–2021 winter holidays, Tannas travelled to Hawaii despite public health advice discouraging non-essential international travel during the COVID-19 pandemic in Canada. Tannas said that he had followed all the rules and health protocols required to undertake international travel and that he would shortly be returning to Alberta.

He was elected joint chair of the Standing Joint Committee on the Library of Parliament in the 45th Canadian Parliament in 2025.

== Personal life ==
Tannas lives in High River, Alberta.

== Election results ==
=== 2012 Alberta Senate nominee election ===
Candidate	Party	Votes #	Votes %	Ballots %	Elected	Appointed	1st	2nd	3rd
Doug Black	Progressive Conservative	427,745	15.90%	38.95%	✓	January 25, 2013	68/87	8/87	3/87
Scott Tannas	Progressive Conservative	351,761	13.07%	32.04%	✓	March 25, 2013	2/87	46/87	14/87
Mike Shaikh	Progressive Conservative	309,587	11.51%	28.19%	✓		2/87	9/87	31/87
Rob Gregory	Wildrose	300,883	11.18%	27.40%			8/87	10/87	18/87
Raymond Germain	Wildrose	299,800	11.14%	27.30%			5/87	13/87	13/87
Vitor Marciano	Wildrose	246,787	9.17%	22.47%			0/87	0/87	6/87
Elizabeth Johannson	EverGreen	149,844	5.57%	13.65%			1/87	1/87	1/87
Len Bracko	Independent	141,830	5.27%	12.92%			1/87	0/87	0/87
David Fletcher	Independent	114,940	4.27%	10.47%			0/87	0/87	0/87
Ian Urquhart	Independent	107,397	3.99%	9.78%			0/87	0/87	1/87
Paul Frank	Independent	93,586	3.48%	8.52%			0/87	0/87	0/87
William Exelby	Independent	81,476	3.03%	7.42%			0/87	0/87	0/87
Perry Chahal	Independent	65,164	2.42%	5.93%			0/87	0/87	0/87
Total		2,690,800		1,098,021					
Rejected, Spoiled and Declined		189,059							
Total Ballots Cast		1,287,080							
