= Canadian Senators Group =

Parliamentary group in the Senate of Canada

Canadian Senators Group Groupe des sénateurs canadiens
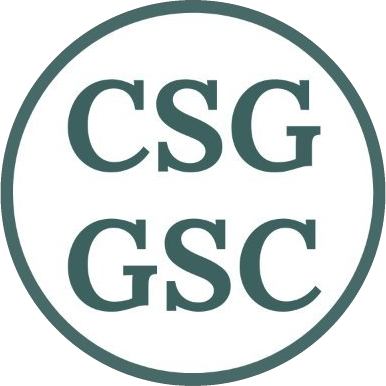
- Leader: Flordeliz "Gigi" Osler
- Deputy Leader: Robert "Rob" Black
- Founded: November 4, 2019
- Split from: Independent Senators Group, Conservative Party of Canada
- Ideology: Non-partisan; Technical group Factions: Regionalism
- Senate: 18 / 105

Party flag
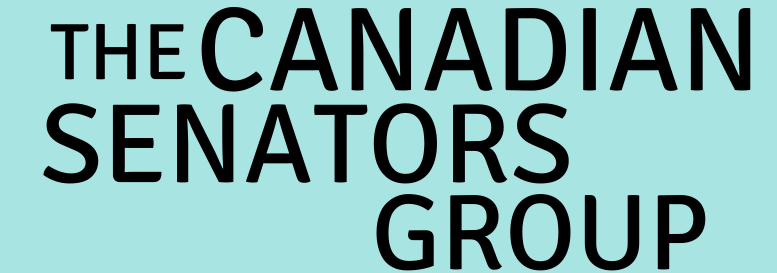

Website
- csg.sencanada.ca/home

The Canadian Senators Group (CSG; French: Groupe des sénateurs canadiens, GSC) is a parliamentary group of senators in the Senate of Canada founded in 2019. The current leader of the group is Flordeliz "Gigi" Osler and the deputy leader is Robert "Rob" Black.

== History ==
The caucus was formed on November 4, 2019, by eight senators from the Independent Senators Group, two from the Conservative Party of Canada's Senate caucus, and one non-affiliated senator.

In an interview with CTV News' Don Martin, Tannas said that the motivation for him and at least several other senators to depart the ISG was a perceived lack of independence in the contentious spring 2019 legislation related to west coast oil tanker moratoriums and other oil and gas-related legislation. Additionally, Tannas cited the concern that the Independent Senators Group, then numbering 58 Senators, had become too large, and that a "wider range of views and approaches" was needed. In addition, in an effort to avoid "groupthink", CSG interim leader Senator Scott Tannas announced that the initial founding members of the group had agreed to cap membership in the group to no more than 25 members. Also included among the reasons for the founding of a second, non-partisan, and independent Senate caucus was a perennially renewed effort to focus on regional issues, despite this notionally being the constitutionally enshrined purpose of the Senate as a whole.

Included among those decamping to the Canadian Senators Group was Elaine McCoy, who previously served as the ISG's founding facilitator from 2016 to 2017.

On November 18, 2019, two more senators joined the CSG: Percy Downe, formerly of the Progressive Senate Group and Senate Liberal Caucus; and Jean-Guy Dagenais, a Conservative. Downe said he still supported the Liberal Party but liked the "diversity of views" in the CSG; while Dagenais cited disagreements with the leadership of Andrew Scheer, particularly Scheer's social views and the "low importance" he placed on Quebec, as the reasons for his defection.

On February 4, 2022, Dennis Patterson joined the CSG, departing the Conservative caucus. The "last straw" was disappointment that members of the party weren't condemning the Freedom Convoy.

On August 4, 2022, Larry Smith left the Conservative caucus to join the CSG. Smith clarified that he would remain a member of the Conservative Party.

== Leaders ==
- Leader: Scott Tannas (since November 4, 2019)
- Deputy leader: Rebecca Patterson (since October 31, 2023)
- Liaison: Percy Downe (since November 20, 2019)
- Deputy liaison: Krista Ross (since December 8, 2024)
- Chair: Gigi Osler (since October 24, 2023)

=== Former leaders ===
- Deputy leader: Josée Verner (November 4, 2019 – May 13, 2021)
- Chair: Robert Black (November 20, 2019 – October 24, 2023)
- Deputy leader: Dennis Patterson (March 21, 2022 – October 31, 2023)

== Membership ==
Name	Province (Division)	Former political affiliation	Joined caucus	Mandatory retirement date
Charles Adler	Manitoba	Non-affiliated	26 May 2025	25 August 2029
Albert Réjean Aucoin	Nova Scotia	Non-affiliated	30 January 2024	4 July 2030
Robert Black	Ontario	Independent Senators Group	4 November 2019	27 March 2037
Sharon Burey	Ontario	Non-affiliated	21 February 2023	4 December 2032
Colin Deacon	Nova Scotia	Independent Senators Group	11 July 2023	1 November 2034
Percy Downe	Prince Edward Island	Progressive Senate Group	18 November 2019	8 July 2029
Clément Gignac	Quebec (Kennebec)	Progressive Senate Group	25 October 2024	7 May 2030
Tony Ince	Nova Scotia	Non-affiliated		16 December 2032
Todd Lewis	Saskatchewan	Non-affiliated	28 February 2025	21 July 2036
Gigi Osler	Manitoba	Non-affiliated	10 January 2023	9 September 2043
Rebecca Patterson	Ontario	Non-affiliated	12 January 2023	15 June 2040
Paul Prosper	Nova Scotia	Non-affiliated	8 November 2023	4 November 2039
Mary Robinson	Prince Edward Island	Non-affiliated	3 June 2024	3 August 2045
Krista Ann Ross	New Brunswick	Non-affiliated	10 January 2024	30 September 2042
Scott Tannas	Alberta	Conservative	4 November 2019	25 February 2037
Josée Verner	Quebec (Montarville)	Independent Senators Group	4 November 2019	30 December 2034

=== Former members ===
Name	Province (Division)	Former political affiliation	Joined caucus	Left caucus	Reason
Elaine McCoy	Alberta	Independent Senators Group	4 November 2019	29 December 2020	Died in office
Doug Black	Alberta	Independent Senators Group	4 November 2019	31 October 2021	Resigned from Senate
Jean-Guy Dagenais	Quebec (Victoria)	Conservative	18 November 2019	2 February 2025	Mandatory retirement from the Senate
Diane Griffin	Prince Edward Island	Independent Senators Group	4 November 2019	18 March 2022	Mandatory retirement from the Senate
Vernon White	Ontario	Independent Senators Group	4 November 2019	2 October 2022	Resigned from Senate
Larry Campbell	British Columbia	Independent Senators Group	4 November 2019	24 October 2022	Changed affiliation to non-affiliated
Dennis Patterson	Nunavut	Conservative	4 February 2022	30 December 2023	Mandatory retirement from the Senate
David Richards	New Brunswick	Non-affiliated	4 November 2019	13 May 2024	Changed affiliation to non-affiliated
Stephen Greene	Nova Scotia (Halifax - The Citadel)	Independent Senators Group	4 November 2019	8 December 2024	Mandatory retirement from the Senate
Sandra Pupatello	Ontario	Non-affiliated	20 May 2025	c. September 2025	Changed affiliation to non-affiliated to accept a position in the Government Representative's Office.
Larry Smith	Quebec (Saurel)	Conservative	4 August 2022	28 April 2026	Mandatory retirement from the Senate
Jim Quinn	New Brunswick	Non-affiliated	8 September 2021	8 July 2026	Changed affiliation to Conservative
Mohammad Al Zaibak	Ontario	Non-affiliated	4 June 2024	9 August 2026	Mandatory retirement from the Senate
Pamela Wallin	Saskatchewan	Independent Senators Group	4 November 2019	18 October 2026	Resigned from Senate

== See also ==
- Independent Senators Group
- Progressive Senate Group
- Senate Liberal Caucus
