= Senate of Canada =

Upper house of the Parliament of Canada

Coordinates: 45°25′29″N 75°41′37″W

Senate of Canada Sénat du Canada
- 45th Parliament

Type
- Type: Upper house of the Parliament of Canada

History
- Founded: July 1, 1867 (commencement of the Constitution Act); October 27, 1867 (first senators appointed)

Leadership
- Speaker: Raymonde Gagné, Non-affiliated since May 16, 2023
- Speaker Pro Tempore: René Cormier, Independent Senators Group since June 5, 2025
- Representative of the Government: Pierre Moreau, Non-affiliated since July 18, 2025
- Senate Opposition Leader: Leo Housakos, Conservative since May 14, 2025
- Facilitator of the ISG: Lucie Moncion since January 1, 2026
- Leader of the CSG: Gigi Osler since January 5, 2026
- Leader of the PSG: Brian Francis since May 15, 2025

Structure
- Seats: 105
- Political groups: His Majesty's Government; Government Representative’s Office (5); His Majesty’s Loyal Opposition; Conservative Party (13); Other groups; Independent Senators Group (37); Progressive Senate Group (17); Canadian Senators Group (15); Non-affiliated (5); Vacancies; Vacant (13)
- Salary: CA$184,800

Elections
- Voting system: Appointment by the King (represented by the governor general) on the advice of the prime minister

Meeting place
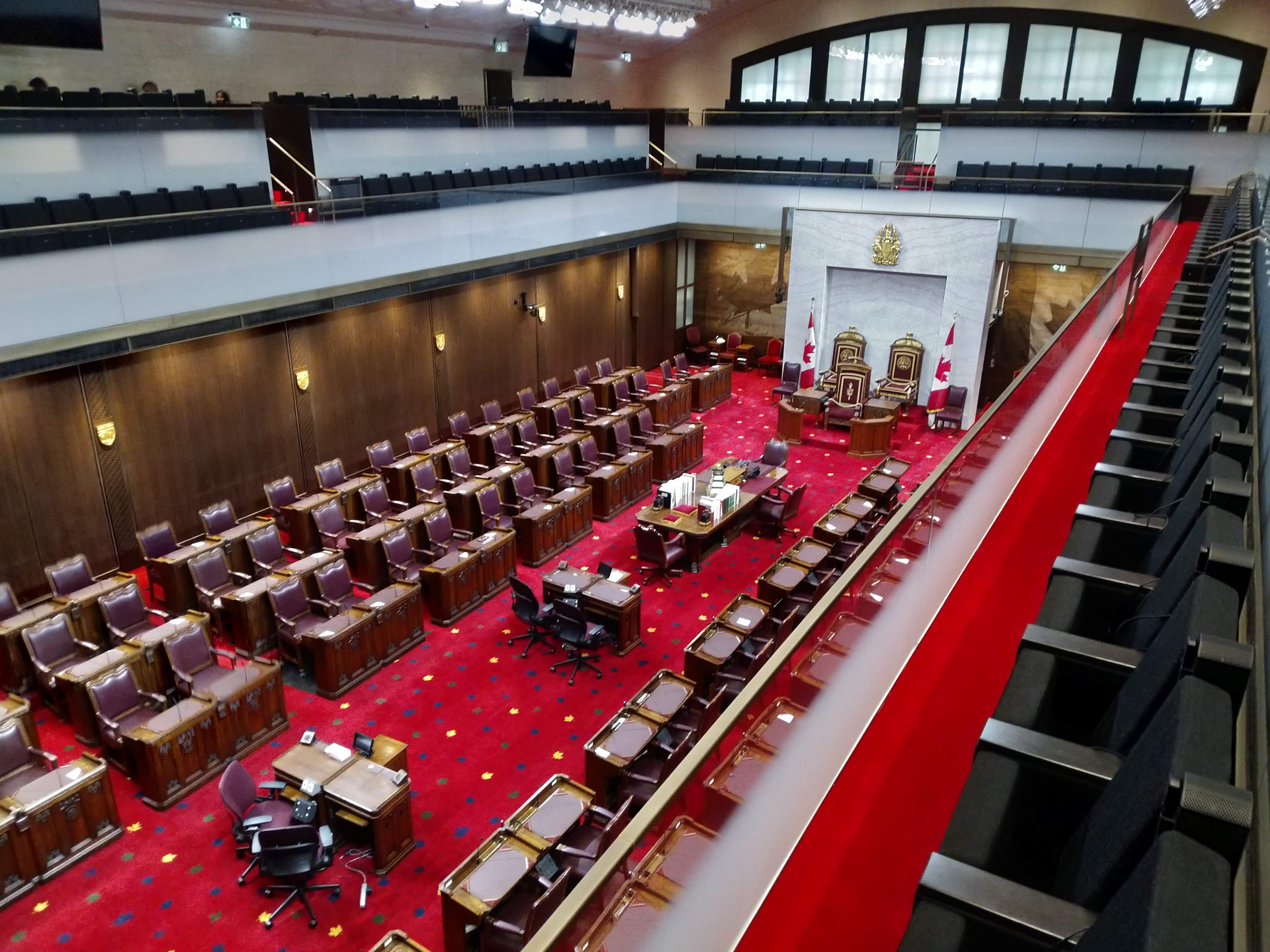
- Senate of Canada Building, Ottawa

Website
- sencanada.ca

Rules
- Rules of the Senate (English, French)

The Senate of Canada (French: Sénat du Canada) is the upper house of the Parliament of Canada. Together with the Crown and the House of Commons, they compose the bicameral legislature of Canada.

The Senate is modelled after the British House of Lords, with its members appointed by the governor general on the advice of the prime minister. The appointment is made primarily by four divisions, each having twenty-four senators: the Maritime division, the Quebec division, the Ontario division, and the Western division. Newfoundland and Labrador is not part of any division, and has six senators. Each of the three territories has one senator, bringing the total to 105 senators. Senate appointments were originally for life; since 1965, they have been subject to a mandatory retirement age of 75.

Although the Senate is the upper house of parliament and the House of Commons is the lower house, this does not imply the former is more powerful than the latter; it merely entails that its members and officers outrank the members and officers of the Commons in the order of precedence for the purposes of protocol. As a matter of practice and custom, the opposite is true, with the House of Commons being the dominant chamber. The prime minister and Cabinet are responsible solely to the House of Commons and remain in office only so long as they retain the confidence of that chamber. Parliament is composed of the two houses together with the "Crown-in-Parliament" (i.e. the monarch, represented by the governor general as viceroy).

The approval of both houses is necessary for legislation to become law, and thus the Senate can reject bills passed by the House of Commons. In practice, this power has rarely been invoked throughout Canadian history. Although legislation can normally be introduced in either chamber, the majority of government bills originate in the House of Commons, with the Senate acting as the chamber of "sober second thought" (as it was called by Sir John A. Macdonald, Canada's first prime minister).

Notable examples of the Senate failing to approve a bill passed by the Commons include its rejection of the Naval Aid Bill in 1912; its refusal to allow a vote on legislation enabling the 1988 Canada–United States Free Trade Agreement, thus precipitating the 1988 federal election; and the 1991 defeat on a tie vote of a bill that would have criminalized abortion.

== History ==
The Senate came into existence in 1867, when the Parliament of the United Kingdom passed the British North America Act, 1867 (now entitled the Constitution Act, 1867), uniting the Province of Canada (as two separate provinces, Quebec and Ontario), Nova Scotia and New Brunswick into a single federal Dominion. The Canadian parliament was based on the Westminster system (that is, the model of the Parliament of the United Kingdom). Canada's first prime minister, Sir John A. Macdonald, described the Senate as a body of "sober second thought" that would curb the "democratic excesses" of the elected House of Commons and provide regional representation. He believed that if the House of Commons properly represented the population, the upper chamber should represent the regions. It was not meant to be more than a revising body or a brake on the House of Commons. Therefore, it was deliberately made an appointed house, since an elected Senate might prove too popular and too powerful and be able to block the will of the House of Commons.

In 2008 the Canadian Heraldic Authority granted the Senate, as an institution, a coat of arms composed of a depiction of the chamber's mace (representing the monarch's authority in the upper chamber) behind the escutcheon of the Arms of Canada.

Change in number of senators over time
Modifying act	Date enacted	Normal total	s. 26 total	Ont.	Que.	Maritime Provinces			Western Provinces				N.L.	N.W.T.	Y.T.	Nu.
Modifying act	Date enacted	Normal total	s. 26 total	Ont.	Que.	N.S.	N.B.	P.E.I.	Man.	B.C.	Sask.	Alta.	N.L.	N.W.T.	Y.T.	Nu.
Constitution Act, 1867	July 1, 1867	72	78	24	24	12	12									
Manitoba Act, 1870	July 15, 1870	74	80	24	24	12	12		2							
British Columbia Terms of Union	July 20, 1871	77	83	24	24	12	12		2	3						
Prince Edward Island Terms of Union (as set out in section 147 of the Constitution Act, 1867)	July 1, 1873	77	83	24	24	10	10	4	2	3						
Manitoba Act, 1870	1882	78	84	24	24	10	10	4	3	3						
	1888	80	86	24	24	10	10	4	3	3				2		
Manitoba Act, 1870	1892	81	87	24	24	10	10	4	4	3				2		
	1903	83	89	24	24	10	10	4	4	3				4		
Alberta Act and Saskatchewan Act	September 1, 1905	87	93	24	24	10	10	4	4	3	4	4				
Constitution Act, 1915	May 19, 1915	96	104	24	24	10	10	4	6	6	6	6				
Newfoundland Act as set out in s. 1(1)(vii) of the Constitution Act, 1915	March 31, 1949	102	110	24	24	10	10	4	6	6	6	6	6			
Constitution Act (No. 2), 1975	June 19, 1975	104	112	24	24	10	10	4	6	6	6	6	6	1	1	
Constitution Act, 1999 (Nunavut)	April 1, 1999	105	113	24	24	10	10	4	6	6	6	6	6	1	1	1

== Senate reform ==
Discussion of Senate reform dates back to at least 1874, but there was little meaningful change until the Independent Advisory Board for Senate Appointments was created in 2016 by Prime Minister Justin Trudeau.

In 1927, The Famous Five Canadian women asked the Supreme Court to determine whether women were eligible to become senators. In the Persons Case, the court unanimously held that women could not become senators since they were not "qualified persons". On appeal, the Judicial Committee of the Privy Council ruled that women were qualified, and four months later, Cairine Wilson was appointed to the senate.

In the 1960s, discussion of reform appeared along with the Quiet Revolution and the rise of Western alienation. The first change to the Senate was in 1965, when a mandatory retirement age of 75 years was set. Appointments made before then were for life.

In the 1970s, the emphasis was on increased provincial involvement in the senators' appointments. Since the 1970s, there have been several proposals for constitutional Senate reform, all of which have failed, including the 1987 Meech Lake Accord, and the 1992 Charlottetown Accord.

Starting in the 1980s, proposals were put forward to elect senators. After Parliament enacted the National Energy Program Western Canadians called for a Triple-E (elected, equal, and effective) senate. In 1982 the Senate was given a qualified veto over certain constitutional amendments. In 1987 Alberta legislated for the Alberta Senate nominee elections. Results of the 1989 Alberta Senate nominee election were non-binding.

Following the Canadian Senate expenses scandal Prime Minister Stephen Harper declared a moratorium on further appointments. Harper had advocated for an elected Senate for decades, but his proposals were blocked by a 2014 Supreme Court ruling that requires a constitutional amendment approved by a minimum of seven provinces, whose populations together accounted for at least half of the national population.

=== Independent Advisory Board for Senate Appointments ===
In 2014, Liberal leader Justin Trudeau expelled all senators from the Liberal caucus and, as prime minister in 2015, announced a new appointment process overseen by a new Independent Advisory Board for Senate Appointments, both of which were attempts to make the Senate less partisan without requiring constitutional change.

The Independent Advisory Board was constituted in 2016. Members of the board include members from each jurisdiction where there is a vacancy. The board provides a short list of recommended candidates to the prime minister, who is not bound to accept them. Some provinces refused to participate, stating that it would make the situation worse by lending the Senate some legitimacy.

From the beginning of the new appointments process in 2016, 100 new senators, all selected under this procedure, were appointed to fill vacancies. All Canadians may now apply directly for a Senate appointment at any time or nominate someone they believe meets the merit criteria.

In 2019, it was reported that candidates shortlisted by the Independent Advisory Board were subject to additional scrutiny from the Prime Minister's Office (PMO) prior to an appointment being confirmed, with the PMO using Liberalist, a Liberal Party donor database and organizing guide, in order to vet prospective appointees. The Globe and Mail reported that one-third of senators appointed under Trudeau had previously donated to the Liberal Party. A 2017 CBC News study had also found that notionally independent senators appointed by Trudeau voted with the government 94.5 percent of the time.

Prime Minister Mark Carney made reforms to the Senate appointment process, removing the non-partisanship criterion. A new Independent Advisory Board for Senate Appointments was established in 2026.

=== Alberta Referendum ===
In the October 2026 Alberta referendum, one of the ten questions asked voters whether Alberta's government should work towards abolishing "the unelected Senate". A majority of about 53 percent of voters decided that they want to keep the Senate. Voter turnout was unusually high for Alberta at slightly over 70 percent for this question, about ten percentage points above the turnout for the previous Provincial general election.

== Chamber and offices ==
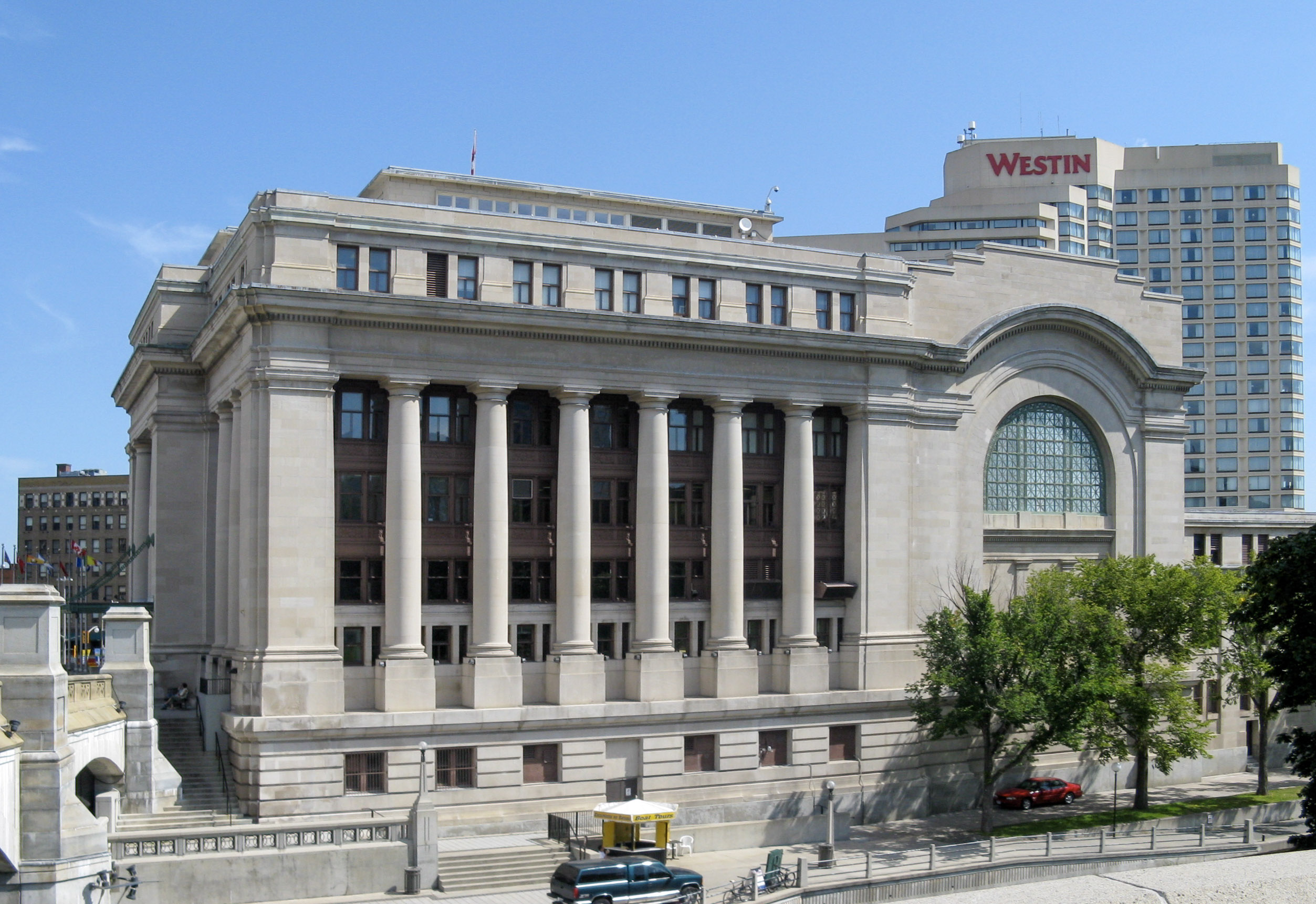
Senate of Canada Building

The original Senate chamber was lost to the fire that consumed the Parliament Buildings in 1916. The Senate then sat in the mineral room of what is today the Canadian Museum of Nature until 1922, when it relocated to Parliament Hill. With the Centre Block undergoing renovations, temporary chambers have been constructed in the Senate of Canada Building (formerly Ottawa Union Station), where the Senate began meeting in 2019.

There are chairs and desks on both sides of the chamber, divided by a centre aisle. A public gallery is above the chamber. The dais of the speaker is at one end of the chamber, and includes the two royal thrones built in 2017, made in part from English walnut from Windsor Great Park. Outside of Parliament Hill, most senators have offices in the Victoria Building across Wellington Street.

== Composition ==
=== Qualifications ===
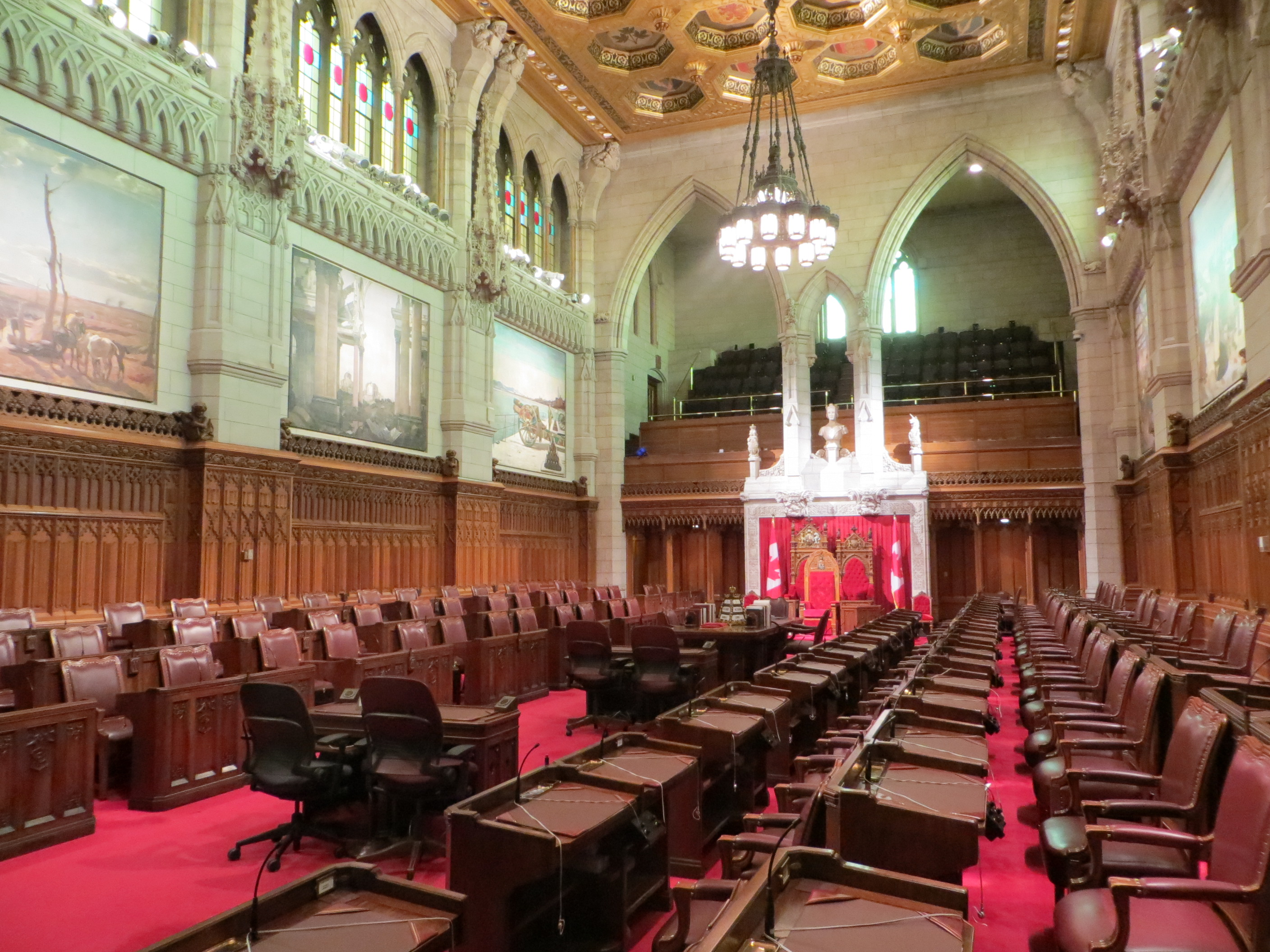
Senate Chamber in the Centre Block in 2016. This chamber began a lengthy renovation in 2019.

Senators are appointed by the governor general via the recommendation of the prime minister. Traditionally, members of the prime minister's party were chosen. The constitution requires that a person be a subject of the King, between 30 and 75 years of age and a resident of the province or territory for which they are appointed, to become a senator. Senators must also own property worth at least $4,000 above their debts and liabilities, a rule introduced to ensure senators were not beholden to economic vagaries and turmoil. There is a mandatory retirement age of 75. A sitting senator is disqualified from holding office if they:

- fail to attend two consecutive sessions of the Senate;
- become a subject or citizen of a foreign power;
- file for bankruptcy;
- are convicted of treason or an indictable offence; or
- cease to be qualified in respect of property or of residence (except where required to stay in Ottawa because they hold a government office).

=== Representation ===
Each province and territory is entitled to its number of Senate seats specified in section 22. That section divides most of the provinces of Canada geographically among four regions, with one province and all three territories remaining outside any division. The divisions have equal representation of twenty-four senators each: Western Canada, Ontario, Quebec, and the Maritimes. The Western division comprises British Columbia, Alberta, Saskatchewan and Manitoba, each having six seats. The Maritimes division comprises New Brunswick and Nova Scotia, who each have ten seats, and Prince Edward Island, which has four seats. Newfoundland and Labrador is represented by six senators. The Northwest Territories, Yukon and Nunavut have one senator each.

Quebec senators are the only ones to be assigned to specific districts within their province. This rule was adopted to ensure that both French- and English-speakers from Quebec were represented appropriately in the Senate.

Population per senator in each region. A redder hue indicates that the region is overrepresented, and a greener hue indicates that the region is underrepresented.

Like most other upper houses worldwide, the Canadian formula does not use representation by population as a primary criterion for member selection, since this is already done for the House of Commons. Rather, the intent when the formula was struck was to achieve a balance of regional interests and to provide a house of "sober second thought" to check the power of the lower house when necessary. Therefore, the most populous province (Ontario) and two western provinces that were low-population at their accession to the federation and that are within a region are under-represented, while the Maritimes are over-represented. For example, British Columbia, with a population of about six million, sends six senators to Ottawa, whereas Nova Scotia and New Brunswick, both with populations under one million, are entitled to ten senators each. Only Quebec has a share of senators approximate to its share of the total population.

Senators must possess land worth at least $4,000 and have residency in the province or territory for which they are appointed. In the past, the residency requirement has often been interpreted liberally, with virtually any holding that met the property qualification, including primary residences, second residences, summer homes, investment properties, and undeveloped lots, having been deemed to meet the residency requirement; as long as the senator listed a qualifying property as a residence, no further efforts have typically been undertaken to verify whether they actually resided there in any meaningful way.

Residency has come under increased scrutiny, particularly as several senators have faced allegations of irregularities in their housing expense claims. In 2013, the Senate's internal economy committee required all senators to provide documents proving their residency in the provinces.

Province or territory	Senate division	Senators	Population per senator (2021)	Total population (2021)	% of senators	% of population	No. of seats, House of Commons	% of seats, Commons
Ontario	Ontario	24	592,664	14,223,942	22.9%	38.5%	122	35.6%
Quebec	Quebec	24	354,243	8,501,833	22.9%	23.0%	78	22.7%
British Columbia	Western Canada	6	833,480	5,000,879	5.7%	13.5%	43	12.5%
Alberta	Western Canada	6	710,439	4,262,635	5.7%	11.5%	37	10.8%
Manitoba	Western Canada	6	223,692	1,342,153	5.7%	3.6%	14	4.1%
Saskatchewan	Western Canada	6	188,751	1,132,505	5.7%	3.1%	14	4.1%
Nova Scotia	Maritimes	10	96,938	969,383	9.5%	2.6%	11	3.2%
New Brunswick	Maritimes	10	77,561	775,610	9.5%	2.1%	10	2.9%
Prince Edward Island	Maritimes	4	38,583	154,331	3.8%	0.4%	4	1.2%
Newfoundland and Labrador	—N/a	6	85,092	510,550	5.7%	1.4%	7	2.0%
Northwest Territories	—N/a	1	41,070	41,070	0.9%	0.1%	1	0.3%
Yukon	—N/a	1	40,232	40,232	0.9%	0.1%	1	0.3%
Nunavut	—N/a	1	36,858	36,858	0.9%	0.1%	1	0.3%
Total/average, Canada		105	352,305	36,991,981	100%	100%	343	100%
Note: Population data based on the latest official 2021 Canadian census, conducted and published by Statistics Canada.

Since 1989, the voters of Alberta have elected "senators-in-waiting", or nominees for the province's Senate seats. These elections, however, are not held pursuant to any federal constitutional or legal provision; thus, the prime minister is not required to recommend the nominees for appointment. Five senators-in-waiting have been appointed to the Senate: the first was Stan Waters, who was appointed in 1990 on the recommendation of Brian Mulroney; the second was Bert Brown, elected a senator-in-waiting in 1998 and 2004, and appointed to the Senate in 2007 on the recommendation of Prime Minister Stephen Harper; the third was Betty Unger, elected in 2004 and appointed in 2012; the fourth and fifth, Doug Black and Scott Tannas, were both elected in 2012 and appointed in 2013. None of the senators-in-waiting elected in 2021 have been appointed to the senate.

The base annual salary of a senator was $184,800 in 2025, although members may receive additional salaries in right of other offices they hold (for instance, the title of Speaker). Most senators rank immediately above Members of Parliament in the order of precedence, although the speaker is ranked just above the speaker of the House of Commons and both are a few ranks higher than the remaining senators.

=== Extraordinary appointment of additional senators ===
Under section 26 of the Constitution Act, 1867 the sovereign may approve the appointment of four or eight extra senators, equally divided among the four regions. Approval is given by the monarch on the advice of the prime minister, and the governor general is instructed to issue the necessary letters patent.

This provision has been used only once: in 1990, when Prime Minister Brian Mulroney requested extra senators to ensure the passage of a bill creating the goods and services tax (GST). The appointment of eight additional senators created a slight majority for the Progressive Conservative Party in the Senate.

An unsuccessful attempt to use section 26 by Prime Minister Alexander Mackenzie in 1874 was denied by Queen Victoria, on the advice of the British Cabinet.

The clause does not result in a permanent increase in the number of Senate seats. Instead, senators leaving office are not replaced until after their Senate region has returned to twenty-four seats.

=== Current composition ===
==== Parliamentary groups ====
Senators are organized into one of four recognized parliamentary groups (or caucuses), or are described as non-affiliated if they are members of none. Three of the parliamentary groups have weak to nonexistent patterns of party discipline and in lieu of a whip designate an individual to serve as a liaison; they have accordingly been compared to technical groups or crossbenchers in other jurisdictions. By contrast, the Conservative group remains affiliated with the federal party with its members attending caucus meetings with its members of the House of Commons; they follow the party whip as a condition of continued affiliation.

Canadian Senate seat allocations in each province and territory, as of August 2025

Caucus	Senators
Independent Senators Group	40
Canadian Senators Group	18
Progressive Senate Group	17
Conservative	12
Non-affiliated (Note: The non-affiliated senators include the Speaker of the Senate and the five members of the Government Representative Office.)	8
Vacant	10
Total	105

While for much of the Senate's history, most senators were affiliated with the same federal political parties that seek seats in elections to the House of Commons, this has changed in the 21st century and the large majority of current senators have no formal partisan affiliations. From 1867 to 2015, prime ministers normally chose members of their own parties to be senators, though they sometimes nominated non-affiliated senators or members of opposing parties. Since November 4, 2015, all newly appointed Senators have not been affiliated with a political party and there has been no government caucus in the Senate. (Note: The Senate Liberal Caucus, which existed from 2014 until 2019, was not affiliated with the governing Liberal Party of Canada) On December 6, 2016, for the first time in Canadian history the number of senators without a partisan affiliation exceeded that of the largest parliamentary group of senators with a partisan affiliation, and on October 17, 2017, the largest parliamentary group became one composed of senators unaffiliated with a political party. By the end of the 43rd Parliament in 2021, only 20 per cent of senators were affiliated with a political party, all members of the Conservative caucus.

==== Gender ====
A majority of sitting senators are women. As of April 28, 2025, there are 57 women in the Senate out of 104 sitting members (54.8%).

The Senate has generally had a higher level of female representation than the House of Commons throughout history. The number of female senators equalled males for the first time ever on November 11, 2020, (Note: Following the mandatory retirement of Norman Doyle, there were 47 male and 47 female senators.) and surpassed males for the first time on October 2, 2022. (Note: Following the resignation of Vernon White, there were 45 female and 44 male senators.)

=== Vacancies ===
There is some debate as to whether there is any requirement for the prime minister to advise the governor general to appoint new senators to fill vacancies as they arise. In 2013, amidst the Canadian Senate expenses scandal, Prime Minister Stephen Harper recommended the final Senate appointments of his tenure and incrementally the membership of the Senate began to shrink via attrition.

The following year, then-Leader of the Opposition Tom Mulcair argued that there is no constitutional requirement to fill vacancies, but constitutional scholar Peter Hogg commented that the courts "might be tempted to grant a remedy" if the refusal to recommend appointments caused the Senate to be diminished to such a degree that it could not do its work or serve its constitutional function. Vancouver lawyer Aniz Alani filed an application for judicial review of Harper's apparent refusal to advise the appointment of senators to fill existing vacancies in 2014, arguing that the failure to do so violates the Constitution Act, 1867.

On July 24, 2015, Harper announced that he would not be advising the governor general to fill the 22 vacancies in the Senate, preferring that the provinces "come up with a plan of comprehensive reform or to conclude that the only way to deal with the status quo is abolition". He declined to say how long he would allow vacancies to accumulate. Under the Constitution Act, 1867, senators are appointed by the governor general on the advice of the prime minister. If no such advice is forthcoming, according to constitutional scholar Adam Dodek, in "extreme cases, there is no question that the Governor General would be forced to exercise such power [of appointment] without advice".

On December 5, 2015, shortly after replacing the Harper government, the new Trudeau government announced a new merit-based appointment process. Appointments resumed on April 12, 2016, with the number of vacant seats having peaked at 24. By December 2018, following 25 further departures and 49 appointments, the Senate had a full complement of senators for the first time in over eight years.

== Officers ==
The speaker of the Senate is the body's presiding officer and is appointed by the governor general on the advice of the prime minister. The speaker is assisted by a speaker pro tempore ('for the time being'), who is elected by the Senate at the beginning of each parliamentary session. If the speaker is unable to attend, the speaker pro tempore presides instead. Furthermore, the Parliament of Canada Act authorizes the speaker to appoint another senator to temporarily serve. Muriel McQueen Fergusson was the Parliament of Canada's first female speaker, holding the office from 1972 to 1974.

The speaker presides over sittings of the Senate and controls debates by calling on members to speak. Senators may raise a point of order if a rule (or standing order) has been breached, on which the speaker makes a ruling. However, the speaker's decisions are subject to appeal to the whole Senate. When presiding, the speaker remains impartial, while maintaining membership in a political party. Unlike the speaker of the House of Commons, the speaker of the Senate does not hold a casting vote, but, instead, retains the right to vote in the same manner as any other. As of the 44th Parliament, Senator Raymonde Gagné presides as Speaker of the Senate.

The senator responsible for steering legislation through the Senate is the representative of the Government in the Senate, who is a senator selected by the prime minister and whose role is to introduce legislation on behalf of the government. The position was created in 2016 to replace the former position of leader of the Government in the Senate. The opposition equivalent is the leader of the Opposition in the Senate, selected by the leader of the Official Opposition. However, if the Official Opposition in the Commons is a different party than the Official Opposition in the Senate (as was the case from 2011 to 2015), then the Senate party chooses its own leader.

Officers of the Senate who are not members include the clerk, the deputy clerk, the law clerk, and several other clerks. These officers advise the speaker and members on the rules and procedure of the Senate. Another officer is the usher of the Black Rod, whose duties include the maintenance of order and security within the Senate chamber. The usher of the Black Rod bears a ceremonial black ebony staff, from which the title "black rod" arises. This position is roughly analogous to that of the sergeant-at-arms in the House of Commons, but the usher's duties are more ceremonial.

== Committees ==
The Parliament of Canada uses committees for a variety of purposes. Committees consider bills in detail and can make amendments. Other committees scrutinize various government agencies and ministries.

The largest of the Senate committees is the Committee of the Whole, which, as the name suggests, consists of all senators. The Committee of the Whole meets in the chamber of the Senate, but proceeds under slightly modified rules of debate. (For example, there is no limit on the number of speeches a senator may make on a particular motion.) The presiding officer is known as the chairman. The Senate may resolve itself into a Committee of the Whole for a number of purposes, including to consider legislation or to hear testimony from individuals. Nominees to be officers of Parliament often appear before Committee of the Whole to answer questions with respect to their qualifications prior to their appointment.

The Senate also has several standing committees, each of which has responsibility for a particular area of government (for example, finance or transport). These committees consider legislation and conduct special studies on issues referred to them by the Senate and may hold hearings, collect evidence, and report their findings to the Senate. Standing committees consist of between nine and fifteen members each and elect their own chairmen.

Senate standing committees
- Aboriginal Peoples
- Agriculture and Forestry
- Banking, Trade, and Commerce
- Conflict of Interest for Senators
- Energy, the Environment and Natural Resources
- Fisheries and Oceans
- Foreign Affairs and International Trade
- Human Rights
- Internal Economy, Budgets, and Administration
- Legal and Constitutional Affairs
- National Finance
- National Security and Defence
- Official Languages
- Rules, Procedure and the Rights of Parliament
- Selection Committee
- Social Affairs, Science and Technology
- Subcommittee on Population Health
- Subcommittee on Cities
- Transport and Communication

Special committees are appointed by the Senate on an ad hoc basis to consider a particular issue. The number of members for a special committee varies, but, the partisan composition would roughly reflect the strength of the parties in the whole Senate. These committees have been struck to study bills (e.g., the Special Senate Committee on Bill C-36 (the Anti-terrorism Act), 2001) or particular issues of concern (e.g., the Special Senate Committee on Illegal Drugs).

Other committees include joint committees, which include both members of the House of Commons and senators. There are currently two joint committees: the Standing Joint Committee on the Scrutiny of Regulations, which considers delegated legislation, and the Standing Joint Committee on the Library of Parliament, which advises the two speakers on the management of the library. Parliament may also establish special joint committees on an ad hoc basis to consider issues of particular interest or importance.

== Legislative functions ==
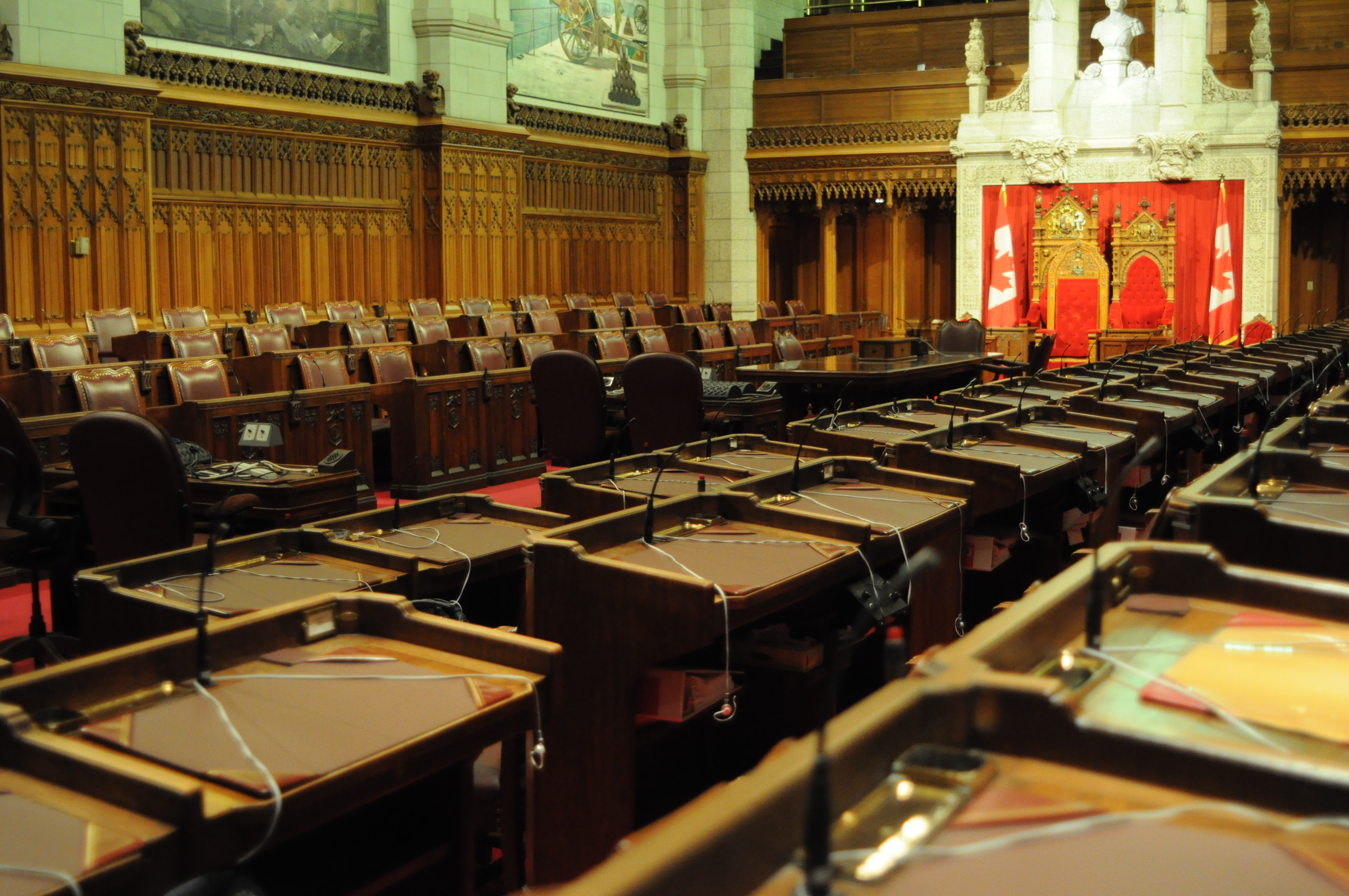
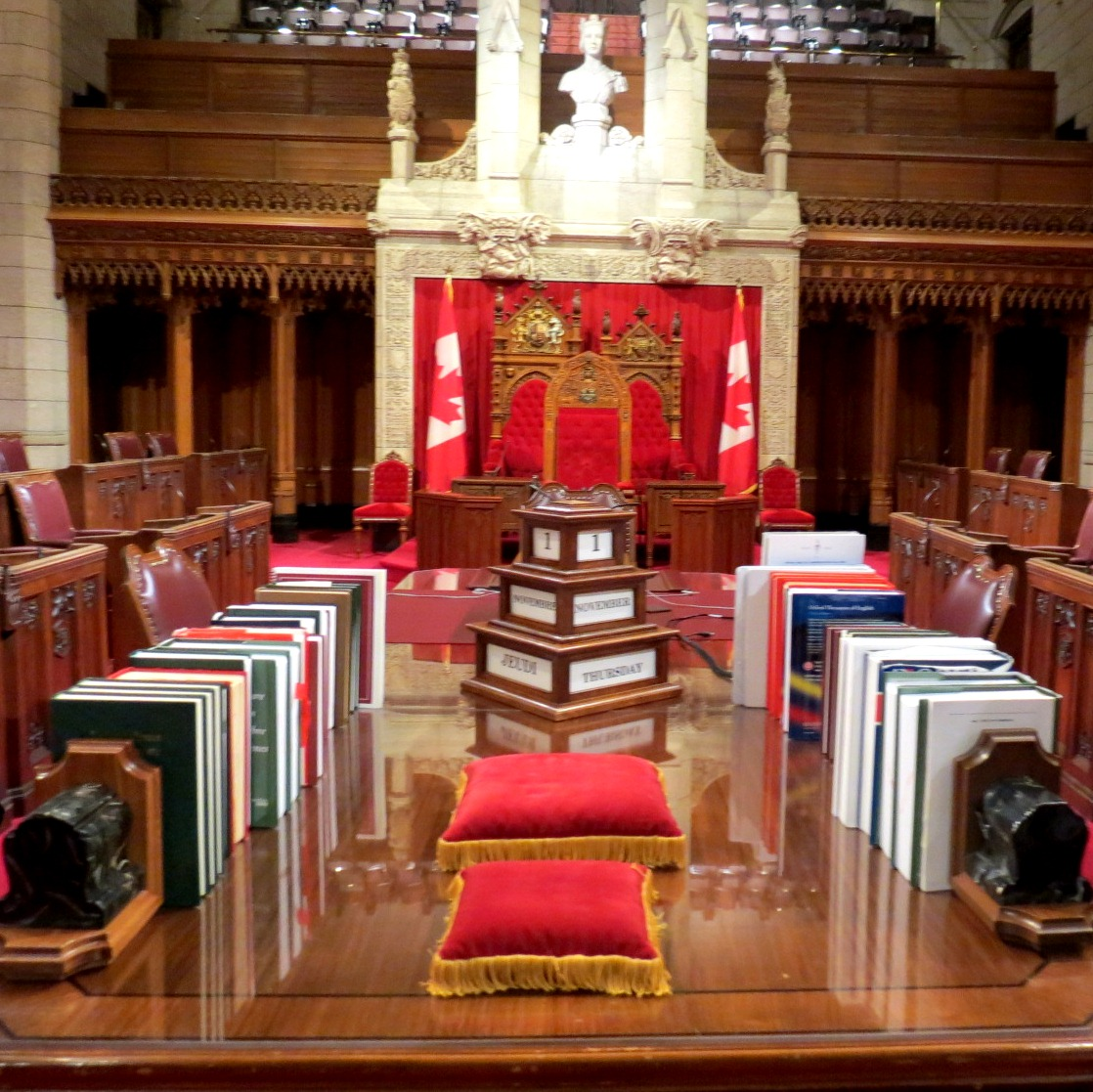
Seats within the old (pre-2019) Senate chamber in the Centre Block

Although legislation may be introduced in either chamber, most bills originate in the House of Commons. Because the Senate's schedule for debate is more flexible than that of the House of Commons, the government will sometimes introduce particularly complex legislation in the Senate first.

In conformity with the British model, the Senate is not permitted to originate bills imposing taxes or appropriating public funds. Unlike in Britain but similar to the United States, this restriction on the power of the Senate is not merely a matter of convention but is explicitly stated in the Constitution Act, 1867. In addition, the House of Commons may, in effect, override the Senate's refusal to approve an amendment to the Canadian constitution; however, they must wait at least 180 days before exercising this override. Other than these two exceptions, the power of the two Houses of Parliament is theoretically equal; the approval of each is necessary for a bill's passage. In practice, however, the House of Commons is the dominant chamber of parliament, with the Senate very rarely exercising its powers in a manner that opposes the will of the democratically elected chamber.

The Senate tends to be less partisan and confrontational than the Commons and is more likely to come to a consensus on issues. It also often has more opportunity to study proposed bills in detail either as a whole or in committees. This careful review process is why the Senate is still today called the chamber of "sober second thought", though the term has a slightly different meaning from what it did when used by John A. Macdonald. The format of the Senate allows it to make many small improvements to legislation before its final reading.

The Senate, at times, is more active at reviewing, amending, and even rejecting legislation. In the first 60 years following Confederation, approximately 180 bills were passed by the House of Commons and sent to the Senate that subsequently did not receive Royal Assent, either because they were rejected by the Senate or were passed by the Senate with amendments that were not accepted by the Commons. In contrast, fewer than one-quarter of that number of bills were lost for similar reasons in the sixty-year period from 1928 to 1987. The late 1980s and early 1990s was a period of contention. During this period, the Senate opposed legislation on issues such as the 1988 free trade bill with the US (forcing the Canadian federal election of 1988) and the Goods and Services Tax. In the 1990s, the Senate rejected four pieces of legislation: a bill passed by the Commons restricting abortion (C-43), a proposal to streamline federal agencies (C-93), a bill to redevelop the Lester B. Pearson Airport (C-28), and a bill on profiting from authorship as it relates to crime (C-220). From 2000 to 2013, the Senate rejected 75 bills in total.

In December 2010, the Senate rejected Bill C-311, involving greenhouse gas regulation that would have committed Canada to a 25 per cent reduction in emissions by 2020 and an 80 per cent reduction by 2050. The bill was passed by all the parties except the Conservatives in the House of Commons and was rejected by the majority Conservatives in the Senate on a vote of 43 to 32.

=== Divorce and other private bills ===
Historically, before the passage of the Divorce Act in 1968, there was no divorce legislation in either Quebec or Newfoundland where the only way for couples to divorce was to apply to Parliament for a private bill of divorce. These bills were primarily handled by the Senate, where a special committee would undertake an investigation of a request for a divorce. If the committee found that the request had merit, the marriage would be dissolved by an Act of Parliament. A similar situation existed in Ontario before 1930. This function has not been exercised since 1968 as the Divorce Act provided a uniform statutory basis across Canada accessed through the court system.

However, though increasingly rare, private bills usually commence in the Senate and only upon petition by a private person (natural or legal). In addition to the general stages public bills must go through, private bills also require the Senate to perform some judicial functions to ensure the petitioner's request does not impair rights of other persons.

=== Investigative functions ===
The Senate also performs investigative functions. In the 1960s, the Senate authored the first Canadian reports on media concentration with the Special Senate Subcommittee on Mass Media, or the Davey Commission, since "appointed senators would be better insulated from editorial pressure brought by publishers"; this triggered the formation of press councils. More recent investigations include the Kirby Commissions on health care (as opposed to the Romanow Commission) and mental health care by Senator Michael Kirby and the Final Report on the Canadian News Media in 2006.

== Relationship with the Government of Canada ==
Unlike the House of Commons, the Senate has no effect in the decision to end the term of the prime minister or of the government. Only the House of Commons may force prime ministers to tender their resignation or to recommend the dissolution of Parliament and issue election writs, by passing a motion of no-confidence or by withdrawing supply. Thus, the Senate's oversight of the government is limited.

The Senate does however, approve the appointment of certain officials and approves the removal of certain officials, in some cases only for cause, and sometimes in conjunction with the House of Commons, usually as a recommendation from the Governor in Council. Officers in this category include the auditor general of Canada, and the Senate must join in the resolution to remove the chief electoral officer of Canada.

Most Cabinet ministers are from the House of Commons. In particular, every prime minister has been a member of the House of Commons since 1896, with the exceptions of John Turner, Mackenzie King (for a two-month period following the 1925 Canadian federal election), and Mark Carney (before the 2025 Canadian federal election). Typically, the Cabinet includes only one senator: the leader of the Government in the Senate. Occasionally, when the governing party does not include any members from a particular region, senators are appointed to ministerial positions in order to maintain regional balance in the Cabinet. The most recent example of this was on February 6, 2006, when Stephen Harper advised that Michael Fortier be appointed to be both a senator representing the Montreal region, where the minority government had no elected representation, and the Cabinet position of Minister of Public Works and Government Services. Fortier resigned his Senate seat to run (unsuccessfully) for a House of Commons seat in the 2008 general election.

== Broadcasting ==
Unlike the House of Commons, proceedings of the Senate were historically not carried by CPAC, as the upper house long declined to allow its sessions to be televised. On April 25, 2006, Senator Hugh Segal moved that the proceedings of the Senate be televised; the motion was referred to the Senate Standing Committee on Rules, Procedures and the Rights of Parliament for consideration; although the motion was approved in principle, broadcast of Senate proceedings was not actually launched at that time apart from selected committee meetings.

Full broadcast of Senate proceedings began on March 18, 2019, concurrent with the Senate's temporary relocation to the Senate of Canada Building.

== See also ==
- Canadian Senate divisions
- Canadian Senate Page Program
- Joint address
- List of current senators of Canada
- List of Senate of Canada appointments by prime minister
- List of women appointed to the Canadian Senate
- Lists of members of the Senate of Canada
- Procedural officers and senior officials of the Parliament of Canada
