= List of senators in the 42nd Parliament of Canada =

This is a list of members of the Senate of Canada in the 42nd Canadian Parliament.

== List of senators ==
Name	Party	Province (Division)^{[Details]}	Date appointed	Appointed by	Left office	Reason	Start	End
Margaret Dawn Anderson	Non-affiliated	Northwest Territories	December 12, 2018	Trudeau, J.	Incumbent		No	Yes
Margaret Dawn Anderson	Independent Senators Group	Northwest Territories	December 12, 2018	Trudeau, J.	Incumbent		No	Yes
Raynell Andreychuk	Conservative	Saskatchewan	March 11, 1993	Mulroney	August 14, 2019	Retirement	Yes	No
Salma Ataullahjan	Conservative	Ontario	July 9, 2010	Harper	Incumbent		Yes	Yes
George Baker	Liberal (Senate caucus)	Newfoundland and Labrador	March 26, 2002	Chrétien	September 4, 2017	Retirement	Yes	No
Denise Batters	Conservative	Saskatchewan	January 25, 2013	Harper	Incumbent		Yes	Yes
Diane Bellemare	Conservative	Quebec (Alma)	September 6, 2012	Harper	Incumbent		Yes	Yes
Diane Bellemare	Non-affiliated	Quebec (Alma)	September 6, 2012	Harper	Incumbent		Yes	Yes
Wanda Thomas Bernard	Non-affiliated	Nova Scotia	November 10, 2016	Trudeau, J.	Incumbent		No	Yes
Wanda Thomas Bernard	Independent Senators Group	Nova Scotia	November 10, 2016	Trudeau, J.	Incumbent		No	Yes
Lynn Beyak	Conservative	Ontario	January 25, 2013	Harper	Incumbent		Yes	Yes
Lynn Beyak	Non-affiliated	Ontario	January 25, 2013	Harper	Incumbent		Yes	Yes
Doug Black	Conservative	Alberta	January 25, 2013	Harper	Incumbent		Yes	Yes
Doug Black	Non-affiliated	Alberta	January 25, 2013	Harper	Incumbent		Yes	Yes
Doug Black	Independent Senators Group	Alberta	January 25, 2013	Harper	Incumbent		Yes	Yes
Robert Black	Non-affiliated	Ontario (Centre Wellington)	February 15, 2018	Trudeau, J.	Incumbent		No	Yes
Robert Black	Independent Senators Group	Ontario (Centre Wellington)	February 15, 2018	Trudeau, J.	Incumbent		No	Yes
Peter Boehm	Non-affiliated	Ontario	October 3, 2018	Trudeau, J.	Incumbent		No	Yes
Peter Boehm	Independent Senators Group	Ontario	October 3, 2018	Trudeau, J.	Incumbent		No	Yes
Pierre-Hugues Boisvenu	Non-affiliated	Quebec (La Salle)	January 29, 2010	Harper	Incumbent		Yes	Yes
Pierre-Hugues Boisvenu	Conservative	Quebec (La Salle)	January 29, 2010	Harper	Incumbent		Yes	Yes
Gwen Boniface	Non-affiliated	Ontario	November 10, 2016	Trudeau, J.	Incumbent		No	Yes
Gwen Boniface	Independent Senators Group	Ontario	November 10, 2016	Trudeau, J.	Incumbent		No	Yes
Patricia Bovey	Non-affiliated	Manitoba	November 10, 2016	Trudeau, J.	May 15, 2023	Retirement	No	Yes
Patricia Bovey	Independent Senators Group	Manitoba	November 10, 2016	Trudeau, J.	May 15, 2023	Retirement	No	Yes
Yvonne Boyer	Non-affiliated	Ontario	March 15, 2018	Trudeau, J.	Incumbent		No	Yes
Yvonne Boyer	Independent Senators Group	Ontario	March 15, 2018	Trudeau, J.	Incumbent		No	Yes
Patrick Brazeau	Non-affiliated	Quebec (Repentigny)	January 8, 2009	Harper	Incumbent		Yes	Yes
Patrick Brazeau	Independent Senators Group	Quebec (Repentigny)	January 8, 2009	Harper	Incumbent		Yes	Yes
Bev Busson	Non-affiliated	British Columbia	September 24, 2018	Trudeau, J.	Incumbent		No	Yes
Bev Busson	Independent Senators Group	British Columbia	September 24, 2018	Trudeau, J.	Incumbent		No	Yes
Larry Campbell	Liberal (Senate caucus)	British Columbia (Vancouver)	August 2, 2005	Martin	Incumbent		Yes	Yes
Larry Campbell	Non-affiliated	British Columbia (Vancouver)	August 2, 2005	Martin	Incumbent		Yes	Yes
Larry Campbell	Independent Senators Group	British Columbia (Vancouver)	August 2, 2005	Martin	Incumbent		Yes	Yes
Claude Carignan	Conservative	Quebec (Mille Isles)	August 27, 2009	Harper	Incumbent		Yes	Yes
Maria Chaput	Liberal (Senate caucus)	Manitoba	December 12, 2002	Chrétien	March 1, 2016	Resignation (Illness)	Yes	No
Daniel Christmas	Non-affiliated	Nova Scotia	December 6, 2016	Trudeau, J.	Incumbent		No	Yes
Daniel Christmas	Independent Senators Group	Nova Scotia	December 6, 2016	Trudeau, J.	Incumbent		No	Yes
Anne Cools	Non-affiliated	Ontario (Toronto-Centre-York)	January 13, 1984	Trudeau, P. E.	August 12, 2018	Retirement	Yes	No
Anne Cools	Independent Senators Group	Ontario (Toronto-Centre-York)	January 13, 1984	Trudeau, P. E.	August 12, 2018	Retirement	Yes	No
Jane Cordy	Liberal (Senate caucus)	Nova Scotia	June 9, 2000	Chrétien	Incumbent		Yes	Yes
René Cormier	Non-affiliated	Manitoba	November 10, 2016	Trudeau, J.	Incumbent		No	Yes
René Cormier	Independent Senators Group	Manitoba	November 10, 2016	Trudeau, J.	Incumbent		No	Yes
Jim Cowan	Liberal (Senate caucus)	Nova Scotia (Halifax)	March 24, 2005	Martin	January 22, 2017	Retirement	Yes	No
Mary Coyle	Non-affiliated	Nova Scotia (Antigonish)	December 4, 2017	Trudeau, J.	Incumbent		No	Yes
Mary Coyle	Independent Senators Group	Nova Scotia (Antigonish)	December 4, 2017	Trudeau, J.	Incumbent		No	Yes
Jean-Guy Dagenais	Conservative	Quebec	January 17, 2012	Harper	Incumbent		Yes	Yes
Pierre Dalphond	Non-affiliated	Quebec (De Lorimier)	June 6, 2018	Trudeau, J.	Incumbent		No	Yes
Pierre Dalphond	Independent Senators Group	Quebec (De Lorimier)	June 6, 2018	Trudeau, J.	Incumbent		No	Yes
Donna Dasko	Non-affiliated	Ontario	June 6, 2018	Trudeau, J.	Incumbent		No	Yes
Donna Dasko	Independent Senators Group	Ontario	June 6, 2018	Trudeau, J.	Incumbent		No	Yes
Dennis Dawson	Liberal (Senate caucus)	Quebec (Lauzon)	August 2, 2005	Martin	Incumbent		Yes	Yes
Joseph A. Day	Liberal (Senate caucus)	New Brunswick (Saint John-Kennebecasis)	October 4, 2001	Chrétien	January 24, 2020	Retirement	Yes	Yes
Colin Deacon	Non-affiliated	Nova Scotia	June 15, 2018	Trudeau, J.	Incumbent		No	Yes
Colin Deacon	Independent Senators Group	Nova Scotia	June 15, 2018	Trudeau, J.	Incumbent		No	Yes
Marty Deacon	Non-affiliated	Ontario (Waterloo)	February 15, 2018	Trudeau, J.	Incumbent		No	Yes
Marty Deacon	Independent Senators Group	Ontario (Waterloo)	February 15, 2018	Trudeau, J.	Incumbent		No	Yes
Tony Dean	Non-affiliated	Ontario	November 10, 2016	Trudeau, J.	Incumbent		No	Yes
Tony Dean	Independent Senators Group	Ontario	November 10, 2016	Trudeau, J.	Incumbent		No	Yes
Jacques Demers	Conservative	Quebec (Rigaud)	August 27, 2009	Harper	August 25, 2019	Retirement	Yes	No
Jacques Demers	Non-affiliated	Quebec (Rigaud)	August 27, 2009	Harper	August 25, 2019	Retirement	Yes	No
Jacques Demers	Independent Senators Group	Quebec (Rigaud)	August 27, 2009	Harper	August 25, 2019	Retirement	Yes	No
Percy Downe	Liberal (Senate caucus)	Prince Edward Island (Charlottetown)	June 26, 2003	Chrétien	Incumbent		Yes	Yes
Norman Doyle	Conservative	Newfoundland and Labrador	January 6, 2012	Harper	Incumbent		Yes	Yes
Mike Duffy	Non-affiliated	Prince Edward Island (Cavendish)	January 2, 2009	Harper	Incumbent		Yes	Yes
Mike Duffy	Independent Senators Group	Prince Edward Island (Cavendish)	January 2, 2009	Harper	Incumbent		Yes	Yes
Pat Duncan	Non-affiliated	Yukon	December 12, 2018	Trudeau, J.	Incumbent		No	Yes
Pat Duncan	Independent Senators Group	Yukon	December 12, 2018	Trudeau, J.	Incumbent		No	Yes
Renée Dupuis	Non-affiliated	Quebec (The Laurentides)	November 10, 2016	Trudeau, J.	Incumbent		No	Yes
Renée Dupuis	Independent Senators Group	Quebec (The Laurentides)	November 10, 2016	Trudeau, J.	Incumbent		No	Yes
Lillian Dyck	Liberal (Senate caucus)	Saskatchewan (North Battleford)	March 24, 2005	Martin	Incumbent		Yes	Yes
Nicole Eaton	Conservative	Ontario (Caledon)	January 2, 2009	Harper	Incumbent		Yes	Yes
Art Eggleton	Liberal (Senate caucus)	Ontario (Toronto)	March 24, 2005	Martin	September 29, 2018	Retirement	Yes	No
Tobias Enverga	Conservative	Ontario	September 6, 2012	Harper	November 16, 2017	Death	Yes	No
Éric Forest	Non-affiliated	Quebec	November 21, 2016	Trudeau, J.	Incumbent		No	Yes
Éric Forest	Independent Senators Group	Quebec	November 21, 2016	Trudeau, J.	Incumbent		No	Yes
Josée Forest-Niesing	Non-affiliated	Ontario	October 11, 2018	Trudeau, J.	Incumbent		No	Yes
Josée Forest-Niesing	Independent Senators Group	Ontario	October 11, 2018	Trudeau, J.	Incumbent		No	Yes
Brian Francis	Non-affiliated	Prince Edward Island	October 11, 2018	Trudeau, J.	Incumbent		No	Yes
Brian Francis	Independent Senators Group	Prince Edward Island	October 11, 2018	Trudeau, J.	Incumbent		No	Yes
Joan Fraser	Liberal (Senate caucus)	Quebec (De Lorimier)	September 17, 1998	Chrétien	February 2, 2018	Resignation	Yes	No
Linda Frum	Conservative	Ontario	August 27, 2009	Harper	Incumbent		Yes	Yes
George Furey	Liberal (Senate caucus)	Newfoundland and Labrador	August 11, 1999	Chrétien	May 12, 2023	Retirement	Yes	Yes
George Furey	Non-affiliated	Newfoundland and Labrador	August 11, 1999	Chrétien	May 12, 2023	Retirement	Yes	Yes
Raymonde Gagné	Non-affiliated	Manitoba	April 1, 2016	Trudeau, J.	Incumbent		No	Yes
Raymonde Gagné	Independent Senators Group	Manitoba	April 1, 2016	Trudeau, J.	Incumbent		No	Yes
Rosa Galvez	Non-affiliated	Quebec	December 6, 2016	Trudeau, J.	Incumbent		No	Yes
Rosa Galvez	Independent Senators Group	Quebec	December 6, 2016	Trudeau, J.	Incumbent		No	Yes
Irving Gerstein	Conservative	Ontario (Toronto)	January 2, 2009	Harper	February 10, 2016	Retirement	Yes	No
Marc Gold	Non-affiliated	Quebec (Stadacona)	November 25, 2016	Trudeau, J.	Incumbent		No	Yes
Marc Gold	Independent Senators Group	Quebec (Stadacona)	November 25, 2016	Trudeau, J.	Incumbent		No	Yes
Stephen Greene	Conservative	Nova Scotia (Halifax — The Citadel)	January 2, 2009	Harper	Incumbent		Yes	Yes
Stephen Greene	Non-affiliated (Independent Reform)	Nova Scotia (Halifax — The Citadel)	January 2, 2009	Harper	Incumbent		Yes	Yes
Stephen Greene	Independent Senators Group	Nova Scotia (Halifax — The Citadel)	January 2, 2009	Harper	Incumbent		Yes	Yes
Diane Griffin	Non-affiliated	Prince Edward Island	November 10, 2016	Trudeau, J.	Incumbent		No	Yes
Diane Griffin	Independent Senators Group	Prince Edward Island	November 10, 2016	Trudeau, J.	Incumbent		No	Yes
Peter Harder	Non-affiliated	Ontario (Ottawa)	March 23, 2016	Trudeau, J.	Incumbent		No	Yes
Nancy Hartling	Non-affiliated	New Brunswick	November 10, 2016	Trudeau, J.	Incumbent		No	Yes
Nancy Hartling	Independent Senators Group	New Brunswick	November 10, 2016	Trudeau, J.	Incumbent		No	Yes
Céline Hervieux-Payette	Liberal (Senate caucus)	Quebec (Bedford)	March 21, 1995	Chrétien	April 22, 2016	Retirement	Yes	No
Leo Housakos	Conservative	Quebec (Wellington)	January 8, 2009	Harper	Incumbent		Yes	Yes
Elizabeth Hubley	Liberal (Senate caucus)	Prince Edward Island	March 8, 2001	Chrétien	September 8, 2017	Retirement	Yes	No
Mobina Jaffer	Liberal (Senate caucus)	British Columbia	June 13, 2001	Chrétien	Incumbent		Yes	Yes
Mobina Jaffer	Non-affiliated	British Columbia	June 13, 2001	Chrétien	Incumbent		Yes	Yes
Mobina Jaffer	Independent Senators Group	British Columbia	June 13, 2001	Chrétien	Incumbent		Yes	Yes
Janis Johnson	Conservative	Manitoba (Winnipeg - Interlake)	September 27, 1990	Mulroney	September 27, 2016	Resignation	Yes	No
Serge Joyal	Liberal (Senate caucus)	Québec (Kennebec)	November 26, 1997	Chrétien	Incumbent		Yes	Yes
Colin Kenny	Liberal (Senate caucus)	Ontario (Rideau)	June 29, 1984	Trudeau, P. E.	February 2, 2018	Resignation	Yes	No
Marty Klyne	Non-affiliated	Saskatchewan	September 24, 2018	Trudeau, J.	Incumbent		No	Yes
Marty Klyne	Independent Senators Group	Saskatchewan	September 24, 2018	Trudeau, J.	Incumbent		No	Yes
Stan Kutcher	Non-affiliated	Nova Scotia	December 12, 2018	Trudeau, J.	Incumbent		No	Yes
Stan Kutcher	Independent Senators Group	Nova Scotia	December 12, 2018	Trudeau, J.	Incumbent		No	Yes
Patti LaBoucane-Benson	Non-affiliated	Alberta	October 3, 2018	Trudeau, J.	Incumbent		No	Yes
Patti LaBoucane-Benson	Independent Senators Group	Alberta	October 3, 2018	Trudeau, J.	Incumbent		No	Yes
Daniel Lang	Conservative	Yukon (Whitehorse)	January 2, 2009	Harper	August 15, 2017	Resignation	Yes	No
Frances Lankin	Non-affiliated	Ontario	April 1, 2016	Trudeau, J.	Incumbent		No	Yes
Frances Lankin	Independent Senators Group	Ontario	April 1, 2016	Trudeau, J.	Incumbent		No	Yes
Tony Loffreda	Non-affiliated	Quebec (Shawinigan)	July 23, 2019	Trudeau, J.	Incumbent		No	Yes
Sandra Lovelace Nicholas	Liberal (Senate caucus)	New Brunswick	September 21, 2005	Martin	Incumbent		Yes	Yes
Michael L. MacDonald	Conservative	Nova Scotia (Dartmouth)	January 2, 2009	Harper	Incumbent		Yes	Yes
Ghislain Maltais	Conservative	Quebec (Shawinigan)	January 6, 2012	Harper	April 22, 2019	Retirement	Yes	No
Fabian Manning	Conservative	Newfoundland and Labrador	May 25, 2011	Harper	Incumbent		Yes	Yes
Elizabeth Marshall	Conservative	Newfoundland and Labrador	January 29, 2010	Harper	Incumbent		Yes	Yes
Yonah Martin	Conservative	British Columbia (Vancouver)	January 2, 2009	Harper	Incumbent		Yes	Yes
Sabi Marwah	Non-affiliated	Ontario	November 10, 2016	Trudeau, J.	Incumbent		No	Yes
Sabi Marwah	Independent Senators Group	Ontario	November 10, 2016	Trudeau, J.	Incumbent		No	Yes
Paul J. Massicotte	Liberal (Senate caucus)	Quebec (De Lanaudière)	June 26, 2003	Chrétien	Incumbent		Yes	Yes
Paul J. Massicotte	Independent Senators Group	Quebec (De Lanaudière)	June 26, 2003	Chrétien	Incumbent		Yes	Yes
Mary Jane McCallum	Non-affiliated	Manitoba	December 4, 2017	Trudeau, J.	Incumbent		No	Yes
Mary Jane McCallum	Independent Senators Group	Manitoba	December 4, 2017	Trudeau, J.	Incumbent		No	Yes
Elaine McCoy	Independent Progressive Conservative	Alberta (Calgary)	March 24, 2005	Martin	Incumbent		Yes	Yes
Elaine McCoy	Non-affiliated	Alberta (Calgary)	March 24, 2005	Martin	Incumbent		Yes	Yes
Elaine McCoy	Independent Senators Group	Alberta (Calgary)	March 24, 2005	Martin	Incumbent		Yes	Yes
Tom McInnis	Conservative	Nova Scotia	September 6, 2012	Harper	Incumbent		Yes	Yes
Paul McIntyre	Conservative	New Brunswick	September 6, 2012	Harper	Incumbent		Yes	Yes
Marilou McPhedran	Non-affiliated	Manitoba	November 10, 2016	Trudeau, J.	Incumbent		No	Yes
Marilou McPhedran	Independent Senators Group	Manitoba	November 10, 2016	Trudeau, J.	Incumbent		No	Yes
Marie-Françoise Mégie	Non-affiliated	Quebec (Rougemont)	November 25, 2016	Trudeau, J.	Incumbent		No	Yes
Marie-Françoise Mégie	Independent Senators Group	Quebec (Rougemont)	November 25, 2016	Trudeau, J.	Incumbent		No	Yes
Terry Mercer	Liberal (Senate caucus)	Nova Scotia (Northend Halifax)	November 7, 2003	Chrétien	Incumbent		Yes	Yes
Pana Merchant	Liberal (Senate caucus)	Saskatchewan	December 12, 2002	Chrétien	March 31, 2017	Resignation	Yes	No
Don Meredith	Non-affiliated	Ontario	December 20, 2010	Harper	May 10, 2017	Resignation	Yes	No
Don Meredith	Independent Senators Group	Ontario	December 20, 2010	Harper	May 10, 2017	Resignation	Yes	No
Don Meredith	Non-affiliated	Ontario	December 20, 2010	Harper	May 10, 2017	Resignation	Yes	No
Grant Mitchell	Liberal (Senate caucus)	Alberta (Edmonton)	March 24, 2005	Martin	Incumbent		Yes	Yes
Grant Mitchell	Non-affiliated	Alberta (Edmonton)	March 24, 2005	Martin	Incumbent		Yes	Yes
Julie Miville-Dechêne	Non-affiliated	Quebec (Inkerman)	June 20, 2018	Trudeau, J.	Incumbent		No	Yes
Julie Miville-Dechêne	Independent Senators Group	Quebec (Inkerman)	June 20, 2018	Trudeau, J.	Incumbent		No	Yes
Percy Mockler	Conservative	New Brunswick (St. Leonard)	January 2, 2009	Harper	Incumbent		Yes	Yes
Lucie Moncion	Non-affiliated	Ontario	November 10, 2016	Trudeau, J.	Incumbent		No	Yes
Lucie Moncion	Independent Senators Group	Ontario	November 10, 2016	Trudeau, J.	Incumbent		No	Yes
Rosemary Moodie	Non-affiliated	Ontario	December 12, 2018	Trudeau, J.	Incumbent		No	Yes
Rosemary Moodie	Independent Senators Group	Ontario	December 12, 2018	Trudeau, J.	Incumbent		No	Yes
Wilfred P. Moore	Liberal (Senate caucus)	Nova Scotia (Stanhope St./Bluenose)	September 26, 1996	Chrétien	January 14, 2017	Retirement	Yes	No
Jim Munson	Liberal (Senate caucus)	Ontario (Ottawa/Rideau Canal)	December 10, 2003	Chrétien	Incumbent		Yes	Yes
Richard Neufeld	Conservative	British Columbia (Charlie Lake)	January 2, 2009	Harper	Incumbent		Yes	Yes
Thanh Hai Ngo	Conservative	Ontario	September 6, 2012	Harper	Incumbent		Yes	Yes
Kelvin Ogilvie	Conservative	Nova Scotia (Annapolis Valley - Hants)	August 27, 2009	Harper	November 6, 2017	Retirement	Yes	No
Victor Oh	Conservative	Ontario	January 25, 2013	Harper	Incumbent		Yes	Yes
Ratna Omidvar	Non-affiliated	Ontario	April 1, 2016	Trudeau, J.	Incumbent		No	Yes
Ratna Omidvar	Independent Senators Group	Ontario	April 1, 2016	Trudeau, J.	Incumbent		No	Yes
Kim Pate	Non-affiliated	Ontario	November 10, 2016	Trudeau, J.	Incumbent		No	Yes
Kim Pate	Independent Senators Group	Ontario	November 10, 2016	Trudeau, J.	Incumbent		No	Yes
Dennis Patterson	Conservative	Nunavut	August 27, 2009	Harper	Incumbent		Yes	Yes
Chantal Petitclerc	Non-affiliated	Quebec (Grandville)	April 1, 2016	Trudeau, J.	Incumbent		No	Yes
Chantal Petitclerc	Independent Senators Group	Quebec (Grandville)	April 1, 2016	Trudeau, J.	Incumbent		No	Yes
Don Plett	Conservative	Manitoba (Landmark)	August 27, 2009	Harper	Incumbent		Yes	Yes
Rose-May Poirier	Conservative	New Brunswick (Saint-Louis-de-Kent)	February 28, 2010	Harper	Incumbent		Yes	Yes
André Pratte	Non-affiliated	Quebec (De Salaberry)	April 1, 2016	Trudeau, J.	Incumbent		No	Yes
André Pratte	Independent Senators Group	Quebec (De Salaberry)	April 1, 2016	Trudeau, J.	Incumbent		No	Yes
Nancy Greene Raine	Conservative	British Columbia (Sun Peaks)	January 2, 2009	Harper	May 11, 2018	Retirement	Yes	No
Mohamed-Iqbal Ravalia	Non-affiliated	Newfoundland and Labrador	June 1, 2018	Trudeau, J.	Incumbent		No	Yes
Mohamed-Iqbal Ravalia	Independent Senators Group	Newfoundland and Labrador	June 1, 2018	Trudeau, J.	Incumbent		No	Yes
David Adams Richards	Non-affiliated	New Brunswick	September 20, 2017	Trudeau, J.	Incumbent		No	Yes
David Adams Richards	Independent Senators Group	New Brunswick	September 20, 2017	Trudeau, J.	Incumbent		No	Yes
David Adams Richards	Non-affiliated	New Brunswick	September 20, 2017	Trudeau, J.	Incumbent		No	Yes
Pierrette Ringuette	Liberal (Senate caucus)	New Brunswick	December 12, 2002	Chrétien	Incumbent		Yes	Yes
Pierrette Ringuette	Non-affiliated	New Brunswick	December 12, 2002	Chrétien	Incumbent		Yes	Yes
Pierrette Ringuette	Independent Senators Group	New Brunswick	December 12, 2002	Chrétien	Incumbent		Yes	Yes
Michel Rivard	Conservative	Quebec (The Laurentides)	January 2, 2009	Harper	August 7, 2016	Retirement	Yes	No
Michel Rivard	Non-affiliated	Quebec (The Laurentides)	January 2, 2009	Harper	August 7, 2016	Retirement	Yes	No
Bob Runciman	Conservative	Ontario	January 29, 2010	Harper	August 10, 2017	Retirement	Yes	No
Nancy Ruth	Conservative	Ontario (Toronto)	March 24, 2005	Martin	January 6, 2017	Retirement	Yes	No
Raymonde Saint Germain	Non-affiliated	Quebec (De la Vallière)	November 25, 2016	Trudeau, J.	Incumbent		No	Yes
Raymonde Saint Germain	Independent Senators Group	Quebec (De la Vallière)	November 25, 2016	Trudeau, J.	Incumbent		No	Yes
Judith Seidman	Conservative	Québec (De la Durantaye)	August 27, 2009	Harper	Incumbent		Yes	Yes
Nick Sibbeston	Liberal (Senate caucus)	Northwest Territories	September 2, 1999	Chrétien	November 21, 2017	Resignation	Yes	No
Nick Sibbeston	Non-affiliated	Northwest Territories	September 2, 1999	Chrétien	November 21, 2017	Resignation	Yes	No
Paula Simons	Non-affiliated	Alberta	October 3, 2018	Trudeau, J.	Incumbent		No	Yes
Paula Simons	Independent Senators Group	Alberta	October 3, 2018	Trudeau, J.	Incumbent		No	Yes
Murray Sinclair	Non-affiliated	Manitoba	April 2, 2016	Trudeau, J.	Incumbent		No	Yes
Murray Sinclair	Independent Senators Group	Manitoba	April 2, 2016	Trudeau, J.	Incumbent		No	Yes
David P. Smith	Liberal (Senate caucus)	Ontario (Cobourg)	June 25, 2002	Chrétien	May 16, 2016	Retirement	Yes	No
Larry Smith	Conservative	Quebec (Saurel)	May 25, 2011	Harper	Incumbent		Yes	Yes
Carolyn Stewart Olsen	Conservative	New Brunswick	August 27, 2009	Harper	Incumbent		Yes	Yes
Scott Tannas	Conservative	Alberta	March 25, 2013	Harper	Incumbent		Yes	Yes
Claudette Tardif	Liberal (Senate caucus)	Alberta (Edmonton)	March 24, 2005	Martin	February 2, 2018	Resignation	Yes	No
David Tkachuk	Conservative	Saskatchewan	June 8, 1993	Mulroney	Incumbent		Yes	Yes
Betty Unger	Conservative	Alberta	January 6, 2012	Harper	August 21, 2018	Retirement	Yes	No
Josée Verner	Conservative	Quebec (Montarville)	June 13, 2011	Harper	Incumbent		Yes	Yes
Josée Verner	Non-affiliated	Quebec (Montarville)	June 13, 2011	Harper	Incumbent		Yes	Yes
Josée Verner	Independent Senators Group	Quebec (Montarville)	June 13, 2011	Harper	Incumbent		Yes	Yes
John D. Wallace	Non-affiliated	New Brunswick (Rothesay)	January 2, 2009	Harper	February 1, 2017	Resignation	Yes	No
Pamela Wallin	Non-affiliated	Saskatchewan (Kuroki Beach)	January 2, 2009	Harper	Incumbent		Yes	Yes
Pamela Wallin	Independent Senators Group	Saskatchewan (Kuroki Beach)	January 2, 2009	Harper	Incumbent		Yes	Yes
Charlie Watt	Liberal (Senate caucus)	Quebec (Inkerman)	January 16, 1984	Trudeau, P. E.	March 16, 2018	Resignation	Yes	No
David Wells	Conservative	Newfoundland and Labrador	January 25, 2013	Harper	Incumbent		Yes	Yes
Howard Wetston	Non-affiliated	Ontario	November 10, 2016	Trudeau, J.	Incumbent		No	Yes
Howard Wetston	Independent Senators Group	Ontario	November 10, 2016	Trudeau, J.	Incumbent		No	Yes
Vernon White	Conservative	Ontario	February 20, 2012	Harper	Incumbent		Yes	Yes
Yuen Pau Woo	Non-affiliated	British Columbia	November 10, 2016	Trudeau, J.	Incumbent		No	Yes
Yuen Pau Woo	Independent Senators Group	British Columbia	November 10, 2016	Trudeau, J.	Incumbent		No	Yes

The province of Quebec has 24 Senate divisions which are constitutionally mandated. In all other provinces, a Senate division is strictly an optional designation of the senator's own choosing, and has no real constitutional or legal standing. A senator who does not choose a special senate division is designated a senator for the province at large.

== Membership changes ==
Date	Name	Province	Affiliation before	Affiliation after	Reason
November 19, 2015	John Wallace	New Brunswick	Conservative	Non-affiliated	Resigned from Conservative caucus
December 3, 2015	Jacques Demers	Quebec	Conservative	Non-affiliated	Resigned from Conservative caucus
December 7, 2015	George Furey	Newfoundland and Labrador	Senate Liberal	Non-affiliated	Resigned from Senate Liberal caucus
February 2, 2016	Pierrette Ringuette	New Brunswick	Senate Liberal	Non-affiliated	Resigned from Senate Liberal caucus
February 10, 2016	Irving Gerstein	Ontario	Conservative	vacant	Mandatory retirement
February 17, 2016	Elaine McCoy	Alberta	Ind. Progressive Conservative	Non-affiliated	Redesignated from Independent Progressive Conservative
March 1, 2016	Maria Chaput	Manitoba	Senate Liberal	vacant	Resigned from Senate
March 7, 2016	Michel Rivard	Quebec	Conservative	Non-affiliated	Resigned from Conservative caucus
March 8, 2016	Diane Bellemare	Quebec	Conservative	Non-affiliated	Resigned from Conservative caucus
March 23, 2016	Peter Harder	Ontario	vacant	Non-affiliated	Appointed to Senate
April 1, 2016	Raymonde Gagné	Manitoba	vacant	Non-affiliated	Appointed to Senate
April 1, 2016	Frances Lankin	Ontario	vacant	Non-affiliated	Appointed to Senate
April 1, 2016	Ratna Omidvar	Ontario	vacant	Non-affiliated	Appointed to Senate
April 1, 2016	Chantal Petitclerc	Quebec	vacant	Non-affiliated	Appointed to Senate
April 1, 2016	André Pratte	Quebec	vacant	Non-affiliated	Appointed to Senate
April 2, 2016	Murray Sinclair	Manitoba	vacant	Non-affiliated	Appointed to Senate
April 6, 2016	Larry Campbell	British Columbia	Senate Liberal	Non-affiliated	Resigned from Senate Liberal caucus
April 22, 2016	Céline Hervieux-Payette	Quebec	Senate Liberal	vacant	Mandatory retirement
May 2, 2016	Grant Mitchell	Alberta	Senate Liberal	Non-affiliated	Resigned from Senate Liberal caucus
May 5, 2016	Nick Sibbeston	Northwest Territories	Senate Liberal	Non-affiliated	Resigned from Senate Liberal caucus
May 16, 2016	David Smith	Ontario	Senate Liberal	vacant	Mandatory retirement
July 14, 2016	Doug Black	Alberta	Conservative	Non-affiliated	Resigned from Conservative caucus
August 7, 2016	Michel Rivard	Quebec	Non-affiliated	vacant	Mandatory retirement
September 27, 2016	Janis Johnson	Manitoba	Conservative	vacant	Resigned from Senate
November 10, 2016	Nancy Hartling	New Brunswick	vacant	Non-affiliated	Appointed to Senate
November 10, 2016	Wanda Thomas Bernard	Nova Scotia	vacant	Non-affiliated	Appointed to Senate
November 10, 2016	Gwen Boniface	Ontario	vacant	Non-affiliated	Appointed to Senate
November 10, 2016	Tony Dean	Ontario	vacant	Non-affiliated	Appointed to Senate
November 10, 2016	Sabi Marwah	Ontario	vacant	Non-affiliated	Appointed to Senate
November 10, 2016	Lucie Moncion	Ontario	vacant	Non-affiliated	Appointed to Senate
November 10, 2016	Kim Pate	Ontario	vacant	Non-affiliated	Appointed to Senate
November 10, 2016	Howard Wetston	Ontario	vacant	Non-affiliated	Appointed to Senate
November 10, 2016	Patricia Bovey	Manitoba	vacant	Non-affiliated	Appointed to Senate
November 10, 2016	René Cormier	Manitoba	vacant	Non-affiliated	Appointed to Senate
November 10, 2016	Marilou McPhedran	Manitoba	vacant	Non-affiliated	Appointed to Senate
November 10, 2016	Renée Dupuis	Quebec	vacant	Non-affiliated	Appointed to Senate
November 10, 2016	Diane Griffin	Prince Edward Island	vacant	Non-affiliated	Appointed to Senate
November 10, 2016	Yuen Pau Woo	British Columbia	vacant	Non-affiliated	Appointed to Senate
November 21, 2016	Éric Forest	Quebec	vacant	Non-affiliated	Appointed to Senate
November 22, 2016	Pierre-Hugues Boisvenu	Quebec	Non-affiliated	Conservative	Rejoined Conservative caucus
November 25, 2016	Marc Gold	Quebec	vacant	Non-affiliated	Appointed to Senate
November 25, 2016	Marie-Françoise Mégie	Quebec	vacant	Non-affiliated	Appointed to Senate
November 25, 2016	Raymonde Saint Germain	Quebec	vacant	Non-affiliated	Appointed to Senate
December 2, 2016	33 Non-affiliated senators	Various	Non-affiliated	ISG	Formation of Independent Senators Group
December 6, 2016	Daniel Christmas	Nova Scotia	vacant	Non-affiliated	Appointed to Senate
December 6, 2016	Rosa Galvez	Quebec	vacant	Non-affiliated	Appointed to Senate
December 16, 2016	Daniel Christmas	Nova Scotia	Non-affiliated	ISG	Redesignated from non-affiliated
December 16, 2016	Rosa Galvez	Quebec	Non-affiliated	ISG	Redesignated from non-affiliated
January 6, 2017	Nancy Ruth	Ontario	Conservative	vacant	Mandatory retirement
January 14, 2017	Wilfred P. Moore	Nova Scotia	Senate Liberal	vacant	Mandatory retirement
January 22, 2017	Jim Cowan	Nova Scotia	Senate Liberal	vacant	Mandatory retirement
January 31, 2017	Josée Verner	Quebec	Conservative	Non-affiliated	Resigned from Conservative caucus
February 1, 2017	John D. Wallace	New Brunswick	Non-affiliated	vacant	Resigned from Senate
March 10, 2017	Don Meredith	Ontario	ISG	Non-affiliated	Resigned from Independent Senators Group
March 10, 2017	Anne Cools	Ontario	Non-affiliated	ISG	Redesignated from non-affiliated
March 30, 2017	Wanda Bernard	Nova Scotia	Non-affiliated	ISG	Redesignated from non-affiliated
March 31, 2017	Pana Merchant	Saskatchewan	Senate Liberal	vacant	Resigned from Senate
May 10, 2017	Don Meredith	Ontario	Non-affiliated	vacant	Resigned from Senate
May 16, 2017	Stephen Greene	Nova Scotia	Conservative	Non-affiliated	Removed from Conservative caucus
August 10, 2017	Bob Runciman	Ontario	Conservative	vacant	Mandatory retirement
August 15, 2017	Daniel Lang	Yukon	Conservative	vacant	Resigned from Senate
August 30, 2017	David Adams Richards	New Brunswick	vacant	Non-affiliated	Appointed to Senate
September 4, 2017	George Baker	Newfoundland and Labrador	Senate Liberal	vacant	Mandatory retirement
September 8, 2017	Elizabeth Hubley	Prince Edward Island	Senate Liberal	vacant	Mandatory retirement
September 28, 2017	David Adams Richards	New Brunswick	Non-affiliated	ISG	Redesignated from non-affiliated
October 17, 2017	Josée Verner	Quebec	Non-affiliated	ISG	Redesignated from non-affiliated
October 24, 2017	Stephen Greene	Nova Scotia	Non-affiliated	ISG	Redesignated from non-affiliated
October 30, 2017	Paul Massicotte	Quebec	Non-affiliated	ISG	Redesignated from non-affiliated
November 6, 2017	Kelvin Ogilvie	Nova Scotia	Conservative	vacant	Mandatory retirement
November 16, 2017	Tobias Enverga	Ontario	Conservative	vacant	Death
November 21, 2017	Nick Sibbeston	Northwest Territories	Non-affiliated	vacant	Resigned from Senate
December 4, 2017	Mary Coyle	Nova Scotia	vacant	Non-affiliated	Appointed to Senate
December 4, 2017	Mary Jane McCallum	Manitoba	vacant	Non-affiliated	Appointed to Senate
January 4, 2018	Lynn Beyak	Ontario	Conservative	Non-affiliated	Removed from Conservative caucus
February 2, 2018	Joan Fraser	Quebec	Senate Liberal	vacant	Resigned from Senate
February 2, 2018	Colin Kenny	Ontario	Senate Liberal	vacant	Resigned from Senate
February 2, 2018	Claudette Tardif	Alberta	Senate Liberal	vacant	Resigned from Senate
February 7, 2018	Mary Coyle	Nova Scotia	Non-affiliated	ISG	Redesignated from non-affiliated
February 7, 2018	Mary Jane McCallum	Manitoba	Non-affiliated	ISG	Redesignated from non-affiliated
February 15, 2018	Robert Black	Ontario	vacant	Non-affiliated	Appointed to Senate
February 15, 2018	Marty Deacon	Ontario	vacant	Non-affiliated	Appointed to Senate
February 28, 2018	Robert Black	Ontario	Non-affiliated	ISG	Redesignated from non-affiliated
February 28, 2018	Marty Deacon	Ontario	Non-affiliated	ISG	Redesignated from non-affiliated
March 15, 2018	Yvonne Boyer	Ontario	vacant	Non-affiliated	Appointed to Senate
March 16, 2018	Charlie Watt	Quebec	Senate Liberal	vacant	Resigned from Senate
March 28, 2018	Yvonne Boyer	Ontario	Non-affiliated	ISG	Redesignated from non-affiliated
April 24, 2018	David Adams Richards	New Brunswick	ISG	Non-affiliated	Redesignated from Independent Senators Group
May 11, 2018	Nancy Greene Raine	British Columbia	Conservative	vacant	Mandatory retirement
June 1, 2018	Mohamed-Iqbal Ravalia	Newfoundland and Labrador	vacant	Non-affiliated	Appointed to Senate
June 6, 2018	Pierre Dalphond	Quebec	vacant	Non-affiliated	Appointed to Senate
June 6, 2018	Donna Dasko	Ontario	vacant	Non-affiliated	Appointed to Senate
June 7, 2018	Mohamed-Iqbal Ravalia	Newfoundland and Labrador	Non-affiliated	ISG	Redesignated from non-affiliated
June 8, 2018	Pierre Dalphond	Quebec	Non-affiliated	ISG	Redesignated from non-affiliated
June 8, 2018	Donna Dasko	Ontario	Non-affiliated	ISG	Redesignated from non-affiliated
June 8, 2018	David Adams Richards	New Brunswick	Non-affiliated	ISG	Redesignated from non-affiliated
June 15, 2018	Colin Deacon	Nova Scotia	vacant	Non-affiliated	Appointed to Senate
June 20, 2018	Julie Miville-Dechêne	Quebec	vacant	Non-affiliated	Appointed to Senate
August 12, 2018	Anne Cools	Ontario	ISG	vacant	Mandatory retirement
August 21, 2018	Betty Unger	Alberta	Conservative	vacant	Mandatory retirement
September 19, 2018	Julie Miville-Dechêne	Quebec	Non-affiliated	ISG	Redesignated from non-affiliated
September 21, 2018	Colin Deacon	Nova Scotia	Non-affiliated	ISG	Redesignated from non-affiliated
September 24, 2018	Bev Busson	British Columbia	vacant	Non-affiliated	Appointed to Senate
September 24, 2018	Marty Klyne	Saskatchewan	vacant	Non-affiliated	Appointed to Senate
September 29, 2018	Art Eggleton	Ontario	Senate Liberal	vacant	Mandatory retirement
October 3, 2018	Peter Boehm	Ontario	vacant	Non-affiliated	Appointed to Senate
October 3, 2018	Patti LaBoucane-Benson	Alberta	vacant	Non-affiliated	Appointed to Senate
October 3, 2018	Paula Simons	Alberta	vacant	Non-affiliated	Appointed to Senate
October 11, 2018	Josée Forest-Niesing	Ontario	vacant	Non-affiliated	Appointed to Senate
October 11, 2018	Brian Francis	Prince Edward Island	vacant	Non-affiliated	Appointed to Senate
October 17, 2018	Bev Busson	British Columbia	Non-affiliated	ISG	Redesignated from non-affiliated
October 17, 2018	Josée Forest-Niesing	Ontario	Non-affiliated	ISG	Redesignated from non-affiliated
October 17, 2018	Brian Francis	Prince Edward Island	Non-affiliated	ISG	Redesignated from non-affiliated
October 18, 2018	Peter Boehm	Ontario	Non-affiliated	ISG	Redesignated from non-affiliated
October 18, 2018	Paula Simons	Alberta	Non-affiliated	ISG	Redesignated from non-affiliated
October 30, 2018	Patti LaBoucane-Benson	Alberta	Non-affiliated	ISG	Redesignated from non-affiliated
October 31, 2018	Marty Klyne	Saskatchewan	Non-affiliated	ISG	Redesignated from non-affiliated
December 12, 2018	Margaret Dawn Anderson	Northwest Territories	vacant	Non-affiliated	Appointed to Senate
December 12, 2018	Pat Duncan	Yukon	vacant	Non-affiliated	Appointed to Senate
December 12, 2018	Stan Kutcher	Nova Scotia	vacant	Non-affiliated	Appointed to Senate
December 12, 2018	Rosemary Moodie	Ontario	vacant	Non-affiliated	Appointed to Senate
December 19, 2018	Mobina Jaffer	British Columbia	Senate Liberal	Non-affiliated	Resigned from Senate Liberal caucus
February 21, 2019	Margaret Dawn Anderson	Northwest Territories	Non-affiliated	ISG	Redesignated from non-affiliated
February 21, 2019	Pat Duncan	Yukon	Non-affiliated	ISG	Redesignated from non-affiliated
February 21, 2019	Stan Kutcher	Nova Scotia	Non-affiliated	ISG	Redesignated from non-affiliated
February 21, 2019	Rosemary Moodie	Ontario	Non-affiliated	ISG	Redesignated from non-affiliated
April 22, 2019	Ghislain Maltais	Quebec	Conservative	vacant	Mandatory retirement
June 12, 2019	Mobina Jaffer	British Columbia	Non-affiliated	ISG	Redesignated from non-affiliated
July 23, 2019	Tony Loffreda	Quebec	vacant	Non-affiliated	Appointed to Senate
August 14, 2019	Raynell Andreychuk	Saskatchewan	Conservative	vacant	Mandatory retirement
August 25, 2019	Jacques Demers	Quebec	ISG	vacant	Mandatory retirement

The party standings in the Senate have changed during the 42nd Canadian Parliament as follows:

Number of members per group by date	2015				2016																		
Number of members per group by date	Oct 19	Nov 19	Dec 3	Dec 7	Feb 2	Feb 10	Feb 17	Mar 1	Mar 7	Mar 8	Mar 23	Apr 1	Apr 2	Apr 6	Apr 22	May 2	May 5	May 16	Jul 14	Aug 7	Sep 27	Nov 10	Nov 21
Conservative	47	46	45			44			43	42									41		40		
Senate Liberal Caucus	29			28	27			26						25	24	23	22	21					
Non-affiliated	6	7	8	9	10		11		12	13	14	19	20	21		22	23		24	23		37	38
Independent PC	1						-																
Total members	83					82		81			82	87	88		87			86		85	84	98	99
Vacant	22					23		24			23	18	17		18			19		20	21	7	6

Number of members per group by date	2016					2017																	
Number of members per group by date	Nov 22	Nov 25	Dec 2	Dec 6	Dec 16	Jan 6	Jan 14	Jan 22	Jan 31	Feb 1	Mar 30	Mar 31	May 10	May 16	Aug 10	Aug 15	Aug 30	Sep 4	Sep 8	Sep 28	Oct 17	Oct 24	Oct 30
Conservative	41					40			39					38	37	36							
Non-affiliated	37	40	7	9	7				8		7		6	7			8			7	6	5	
Senate Liberal Caucus	21						20	19				18						17	16				15
Independent Senators Group	-		33		35					34	35									36	37	38	39
Total members	99	102		104		103	102	101		100		99	98		97	96	97	96	95				
Vacant	6	3		1		2	3	4		5		6	7		8	9	8	9	10				

Number of members per group by date	2017				2018																		
Number of members per group by date	Nov 6	Nov 16	Nov 21	Dec 4	Jan 4	Feb 2	Feb 7	Feb 15	Feb 28	Mar 15	Mar 16	Mar 28	Apr 24	May 11	Jun 1	Jun 6	Jun 7	Jun 8	Jun 15	Jun 20	Aug 12	Aug 20	Sep 19
Independent Senators Group	39						41		43			44	43				44	46			45		46
Conservative	35	34			33									32								31	
Senate Liberal Caucus	15					12					11												
Non-affiliated	5		4	6	7		5	7	5	6		5	6		7	9	8	6	7	8			7
Total members	94	93	92	94		91		93		94	93			92	93	95			96	97	96	95	
Vacant	11	12	13	11		14		12		11	12			13	12	10			9	8	9	10	

Number of members per group by date	2018											2019					
Number of members per group by date	Sep 21	Sep 24	Sep 29	Oct 3	Oct 11	Oct 17	Oct 18	Oct 30	Oct 31	Dec 12	Dec 19	Feb 21	Apr 22	Jun 12	Jul 23	Aug 14	Aug 25
Independent Senators Group	47					50	52	53	54			58		59			58
Conservative	31												30			29	
Senate Liberal Caucus	11		10								9						
Non-affiliated	6	8		11	13	10	8	7	6	10	11	7		6	7		
Total members	95	97	96	99	101					105			104		105	104	103
Vacant	10	8	9	6	4					0			1		0	1	2

== See also ==
- List of House members of the 42nd Parliament of Canada
- Women in the 42nd Canadian Parliament
- List of current senators of Canada
