= Noni MacDonald =

Canadian physician

Noni E. MacDonald OC ONS
- Education: University of Ottawa; Queen's University; McGill University; University of Rochester
- Scientific career
- Workplaces: University of Ottawa; Children's Hospital of Eastern Ontario; Dalhousie University

Noni E. MacDonald OC ONS is a Canadian physician. She is a Professor in the Department of Pediatrics and former Dean of the Faculty of Medicine at Dalhousie University. In 2019, MacDonald was awarded the Order of Nova Scotia and Order of Canada.

== Early life and education ==
MacDonald earned her bachelor's degree at Queen's University in 1970. She moved to the University of Ottawa for her graduate studies, where she specialised in microbiology. She remained here for her medical degree, which she completed magna cum laude in 1975.

MacDonald was awarded the university medal for highest academic attainment. She remained in Ottawa for her residency training and became board certified in 1978. MacDonald completed her speciality training in paediatric infectious diseases at McGill University and the University of Rochester. In 1983 MacDonald was the first paediatrician in Canada to complete the Royal College of Physicians and Surgeons of Canada certification in paediatric infectious diseases.

== Career ==
In 1981, MacDonald joined the faculty at the University of Ottawa, where she founded the Division of Infectious Diseases. She led the Paediatric Infectious Diseases Service at the Children's Hospital of Eastern Ontario. In 1996 MacDonald founded the journal Paediatrics & Child Health, which was the first Canadian journal on paediatric medicine. Her research considered the microbiology of cystic fibrosis, sexually transmitted infections in adolescents and the development of vaccinations for infectious diseases.

In 1999 MacDonald left Ottawa and moved to Halifax, Nova Scotia. At Dalhousie University she became the first woman in Canada to be elected Dean of a Faculty of Medicine, and held this position until 2004. That year she was a founding member of the World Health Organisation Global Advisory Committee on Vaccine Safety, and has held various positions on technical committees and in training development since then. She remains on their Strategic Advisory Committee on Immunisation, which considers the demand for vaccines, as well as serving as a consultant for vaccine safety. As part of her work with the WHO MacDonald is developing the 2021 – 2030 Global Vaccine Action Plan.

== Affiliations ==
In 2004, with support from the Canada Foundation for Innovation she founded the Canadian Center for Vaccinology (CCfV). The CCfV was established to implement and evaluate vaccine technologies as well as training experts in infectious diseases and global health. She has spoken about the dangers of vaccine hesitancy and how the internet permits the dangerous messaging of anti-vaxxers. At Dalhousie University, MacDonald teaches a course Addressing Evidence Denial in Public.

MacDonald serves on the advisory board of the National Collaborating Centre for Infectious Diseases and on the Board of Directors of Academics Without Borders. MacDonald is interested in building the healthcare capacity of the developing world. She co-founded East Africa's MicroResearch, a program that looks to support local health providers. MicroResearch is modelled on principles from microfinance, developing solutions that are appropriate for the context and culture of African communities. From 2008 to 2019 MicroResearch had led more than forty two-week workshops across seven African countries, training in excess of 1000 healthcare professionals and community members. In particular MicroResearch looked to train women, improving their opportunities for leadership and tackling the gender gap in African research. The success of the programme resulted in a similar version being launched in Canada in 2016.

She was invested into the Order of Nova Scotia in 2019. That year she was also awarded the Lifetime Achievement Award from the Canadian Society for International Health. In 2021, MacDonald was appointed as a Fellow of the Royal Society of Canada.

== Selected publications ==
Her publications include:

- MacDonald, Noni E. (1982). "Respiratory Syncytial Viral Infection in Infants with Congenital Heart Disease". N Engl J Med. 307 (7): 397–400. doi:10.1056/NEJM198208123070702. PMID 7088112.
- MacDonald, Noni E. (1990). "High-Risk STD/HIV Behavior Among College Students". JAMA. 263 (23): 3155–3159. doi:10.1001/jama.1990.03440230051031. PMID 2348524.
- MacDonald, Noni E. (1998). "Induction of Immunologic Memory by Conjugated vs Plain Meningococcal C Polysaccharide Vaccine in Toddlers". JAMA. 280 (19): 1685–1689. doi:10.1001/jama.280.19.1685. PMID 9832000.

MacDonald has served as editor for the journals Paediatrics & Child Health and the Canadian Medical Association Journal, as well as acting as child health editor for the Oxford Research Encyclopaedia of Global Public Health. In 2004 the Canadian Paediatric Society founded the Noni MacDonald Award, which is given annually to researchers who have positively affected paediatrics.

== Personal life ==
MacDonald is married with children. Alongside her research she enjoys skiing and pottery.
