= Stephen Greene (politician) =

Canadian politician

The Honourable Stephen Greene
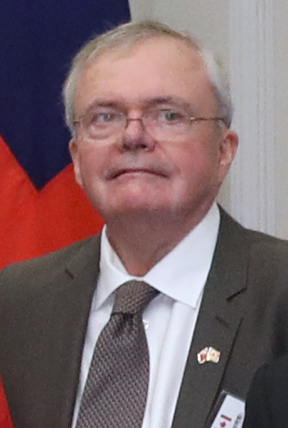

Canadian Senator from Nova Scotia
- In office 2 January 2009 – 8 December 2024
- Nominated by: Stephen Harper
- Appointed by: Michaëlle Jean

Personal details
- Born: 8 December 1949 (age 76) Montreal, Quebec, Canada
- Party: Canadian Senators Group
- Other political affiliations: Independent Senators Group (2017-2019); Conservative (2009-2017); Reform Party of Canada (1993-2000), Progressive Conservative Party of Nova Scotia
- Education: McMaster University; Dalhousie University
- Occupation: Businessman; executive director; political advisor

Stephen Greene (born 8 December 1949) is a Canadian politician and a former independent member of the Senate of Canada. He was appointed on the advice of Stephen Harper to the Senate on 2 January 2009, and sat as a Conservative Senator until May 2017, when Senate Leader Larry Smith removed him for his support for Senate reform proposals put forth by the governing Liberal Party. Greene then decided to sit as an "Independent Reform" Senator. He retired from the Senate on 8 December 2024 upon reaching the mandatory retirement age of 75.

== Early life and career ==
Greene was born in Montreal, Quebec.

Greene served as Chief of Staff in the office of Reform Party of Canada leader Preston Manning for four years. He encouraged future Prime Minister Stephen Harper to run for the leadership of the Reform party's successor party, the Canadian Alliance.

He was an unsuccessful Reform Party candidate in Halifax in the 1993 and 1997 federal elections.

== Senate ==
Greene joined the Senate on 2 January 2009, after being appointed by Prime Minister Stephen Harper. In an interview with The Chronicle Herald after the appointment had been announced in 2008, Greene indicated that he wished to work on reforming the Senate.

He served as Deputy Government Whip in the Senate from 2010 until June 2011, when he became the Vice Chair of the Standing Senate Committee on Transport. In September 2011, Greene argued that if term limits were added for Senators, the mandatory retirement age of 75 should be removed, citing the case of Senator Vim Kochhar, who worked 14 hours days despite hitting the mandatory retirement age after only two years. In June 2012, the Senate Transport committee on which he was deputy chair issued "The Future of Canadian Air Travel: Toll Booth or Spark Plug?", a report which called on the government to stop requiring Canadian airports to pay rent, which was making them uncompetitive for Canadian flyers compared to American airports south of the border.

In December 2012, Greene, along with Senators Mike Duffy from Prince Edward Island and John D. Wallace from New Brunswick, promoted the idea of Maritime Union, a proposal which would require amending the Constitution of Canada. In a speech to the Halifax West Conservative Riding Association, Greene argued that Maritime Union would reduce the inefficiencies in having multiple provincial governments and bureaucracies for a population one seventh the size of Ontario. Greene also argued that despite the similarities and shared history of the Maritimes, the "artificial" provincial barriers inhibit growth by competing for private sector money and imposing trade barriers on each other.

On 13 September 2013, Greene left his position as Vice Chair of the Standing Senate Committee on Transport and became Deputy Government Whip again.

In July 2015, Greene co-authored a report with Liberal Quebec Senator Paul Massicotte which argued that the Senate's "institutionalized partisanship" should end. After the 2015 federal election, Greene became the only Conservative to sponsor a government bill during the 42nd Canadian Parliament, sponsoring Bill S-4, which implemented double taxation deals with Taiwan and Israel, which was functionally similar to a bill Greene said he had sponsored during the Harper government.

In 2016, Greene endorsed Maxime Bernier in the 2017 Conservative Party of Canada leadership election, and as of May 2017, was the Nova Scotia chair of his leadership campaign. Greene became Deputy Opposition Whip in the Senate on 7 March 2016. In February 2017, Greene proposed an amendment to Bill S-2, a government bill on vehicle safety which would require automobile manufacturers to compensate dealers for unsold vehicles subject to recall. It was supported and incorporated into the Bill by a majority of the Senate.

In March 2017, Greene unsuccessfully ran to succeed Claude Carignan as leader of the Senate Conservatives, losing to Larry Smith. A few days after his defeat, Greene was no longer the Deputy Opposition Whip.

In May 2017, Smith told Greene that if he wished to remain in the Senate Conservatives, he could not accept a dinner invitation from Prime Minister Justin Trudeau thanking all Senators who had sponsored government legislation. According to Smith, Greene's votes at the Senate Modernization Committee in support of plans by Peter Harder, the Liberal government representative in the Senate, were too far out of line for a Conservative Senator because the reform would "effectively eliminate the Opposition." According to Greene, he had offered to report to Smith about the government's plans for the Senate, but was rebuffed. Greene chose to leave caucus and sit as an "Independent Reform" Senator.

Greene joined the Independent Senators Group on 24 October 2017 and left the Conservative Party of Canada. On 4 November 2019, he joined the Canadian Senators Group.

== Electoral record ==
1997 Canadian federal election: Halifax
Party	Candidate	Votes	%	±%
New Democratic	Alexa McDonough	21,837	49.02	+36.80
Progressive Conservative	Terry Donahoe	10,361	23.26	+1.63
Liberal	Mary Clancy	9,638	21.64	-25.78
Reform	Steve Greene	2,422	5.44	-8.31
Natural Law	Gilles Bigras	197	0.44	
Marxist–Leninist	Tony Seed	89	0.20	
Total valid votes		44,544	99.44	
Total rejected, unmarked and declined ballots		252	0.56	
Turnout		44,796	68.85	
Eligible voters		65,061		
New Democratic notional gain from Liberal		Swing		+31.29

1993 Canadian federal election: Halifax
Party	Candidate	Votes	%	±%
Liberal	Mary Clancy	21,326	45.91	+2.90
Progressive Conservative	Jim Vaughan	9,600	20.67	-17.31
Reform	Steve Greene	6,717	14.46	
New Democratic	Lynn Jones	6,214	13.38	-4.36
National	Charles Phillips	1,383	2.98	
Natural Law	Gilles Bigras	448	0.96	
Green	W. Vladimir Klonowski	307	0.66	
Independent	A.R. Art Canning	277	0.60	
Independent	Steve Rimek	99	0.21	
Marxist–Leninist	Tony Seed	84	0.18	-0.08
Total valid votes		46,455	99.06	
Total rejected, unmarked and declined ballots		439	0.94	
Turnout		46,894	58.94	
Eligible voters		79,568		
Liberal hold		Swing		+10.10

Changes for Marxist–Leninist candidate Tony Seed are based on his 1988 results, when he ran as an Independent.
