= Hartling =

Hartling is a surname. Notable people with the surname include:

- Carlos Hartling (1869–1920), German-born composer from Honduras
- Nancy Hartling (born 1950), Canadian politician
- Nicolai Hartling (born 1994), Danish hurdler
- Poul Hartling (1914–2000), Danish diplomat and politician
- Peter Härtling (born 1933), German writer and poet

== See also ==
- Hartling, synonym for red grape variety Cabernet Franc
