= Michel Després =

Canadian politician (born 1957)

MNA for Limoilou
- In office 1985–1994
- Preceded by: Raymond Gravel
- Succeeded by: Michel Rivard
- In office 1998–2003
- Preceded by: Michel Rivard
- Succeeded by: None, district abolished

MNA for Jean-Lesage
- In office 2003–2007
- Preceded by: None, new district
- Succeeded by: Jean-François Gosselin

Personal details
- Born: October 14, 1957 (age 68) Quebec City, Quebec
- Party: Liberal Party of Quebec
- Portfolio: Minister of Labor, Minister of Transport

Michel Després (French: [miʃɛl depʁe]; born October 14, 1957 in Quebec City, Quebec) is an administrator, consultant and a former Quebec politician. He was the former MNA member of the former riding of Limoilou from 1985 to 1994 and 1998 to 2003 and the former member of the riding of Jean-Lesage from 2003 and 2007 when he was defeated. He represented the Quebec Liberal Party during all his political career.

Després studied at the Université Laval and obtained a bachelor's degree in business administration in 1982. He would become the director of the Fishing Industry Association of Quebec.

Després jumped into politics in 1985 and became the new MNA for the Quebec City riding of Limoulou as the Liberal Party led by Robert Bourassa defeated the Parti Québécois. He would be re-elected in 1989 before temporarily halting his political career prior to the 1994 elections. Between 1994 and 1998 he was a consultant in management and a councilor at the Department of Canadian Heritage.

He would seek another election in 1998 reclaiming the riding of Limoilou before winning again in Jean-Lesage in 2003. While he had been a backbencher MNA during the two mandates of Robert Bourassa, Després had a larger role in the first mandate of Jean Charest, who nominated him as the Minister of Labor. Despres would adopt Bill 31 which introduced subcontracting in the public sector. The bill was met with opposition by most of its employees and was staged a one-day strike in 2003. The bill would be reinforced in mid-December 2003 as a special law which was voted in favor by the Liberal majority government.

Following a cabinet shuffle in 2005, Després was named the Transport Minister as well as the Minister of the Capitale-Nationale (Quebec) region. In 2007, he announced a significant increase of fundings on building or upgrading new highways as well as the reconstruction of bridges, roads and overpasses in the light of the Concorde Overpass collapse in 2006. In his region, he was unable to keep the Quebec Zoo Park opened due to financial difficulties and failed to open a new mini-zoo that would have replaced the former touristic site.

Després lost his seat in the 2007 elections when the Action démocratique du Québec won most of the seats in the region and caused the Liberals to lose its majority government status.
