= Murder of Anthony Joseph Dolff =

1993 murder in Canada

Anthony Joseph Dolff, was a farmer in Kamsack, Saskatchewan, Canada, who was killed in 1993. He was stabbed 17 times, hit on the head with a television, and strangled with a telephone cord. Three Saulteaux people, members of the Keeseekoose First Nation, were convicted of the crime. One, Jason Keshane, 14 years old at the time of the crime, confessed to the killing and as a juvenile was sentenced to two years in prison for second degree murder. His cousins, sisters Nerissa and Odelia Quewezance, 19 and 21 at the time, were sentenced to life in prison. Neither confessed and both have maintained their innocence at all times. Dolff had been a maintenance man at the residential school the two sisters attended. That night they reportedly drank a great deal of liquor and took prescription sleeping pills at Dolff's house, where he pestered them for sex. When he discovered that Odelia had taken money from his bedroom, a violent confrontation took place, in the course of which he was killed.

The sisters' convictions are considered by many people to be a miscarriage of justice. Keshane, maintains that his cousins were not involved in the killing. The two sisters asked for a lawyer when they were arrested but were interrogated for five days in RCMP custody without one. The Congress of Aboriginal Peoples has called for their exoneration and release, as has Innocence Canada. Two retired judges, Harry LaForme, the first indigenous lawyer to serve on an appellate court in Canada, and Juanita Westmoreland-Traoré, the first Black judge in Quebec, have also called for their release. David Milgaard, who was wrongfully convicted of rape and murder, also believes that they are innocent and has called for their release. In May 2022, Senators Kim Pate, Dawn Anderson, and Yvonne Boyer issued a report calling for the review of the cases of 12 indigenous women including the Quewezance sisters (designated in the report as "N.Q." and "O.Q.") and their exoneration. In June, 2022 Justice Minister David Lametti agreed to review their convictions. In March 2023, Saskatchewan judge Donald Layh ordered the release on bail of the two Quewezance sisters.

The sisters' story was the topic of a 2020 APTN Investigates two-part documentary called A Life Sentence that introduced the case to the mainstream media. Investigative journalists Holly Moore and John Murray travelled to Keeseekoose First Nation where they tracked down Jason Keshane and he repeated his confession on camera.
