= Danièle Henkel =

Canadian writer and businessperson

The Honourable Danièle Henkel

Senator for Quebec (Alma)
- Incumbent
- Assumed office February 14, 2025
- Appointed by: Mary Simon, Governor General of Canada
- Preceded by: Diane Bellemare

Personal details
- Born: January 16, 1956 (age 70) Oujda, Morocco
- Party: Progressive Senate Group
- Spouse: Ahmad (divorced)
- Children: 4
- Occupation: Businesswoman, author, speaker, politician
- Profession: Entrepreneur, strategic advisor
- Website: DanieleHenkel.com

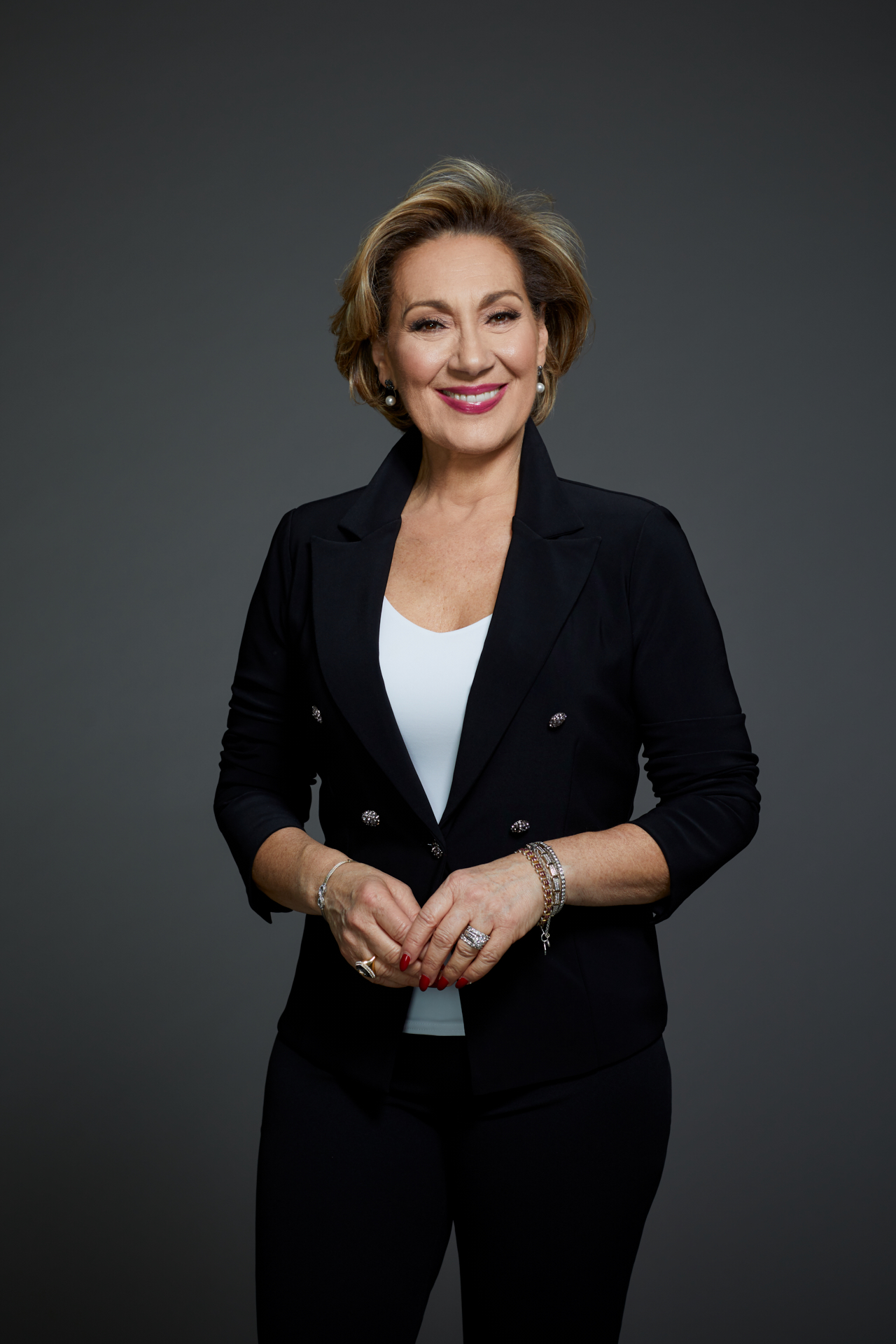
Photo of Danièle Henkel

Danièle Henkel (born January 16, 1956) is a Canadian businesswoman, author, television personality, and politician, who has been serving as a senator from Quebec (Alma) since February 2025. She is the founder and CEO of Entreprises Danièle Henkel Inc., a company known for its popular gant Renaissance exfoliating glove and other health and beauty products. Henkel gained prominence as one of the investor panelists on the television show Dans l'œil du dragon, the Canadian French-language version of Dragons' Den from 2012 to 2016. A longtime public speaker and advocate for entrepreneurship, she has served on numerous organizational boards and initiatives. On February 14, 2025, Henkel was appointed to the Senate of Canada by Governor General Mary Simon on the advice of Prime Minister Justin Trudeau.

== Early life and education ==
Henkel was born on January 16, 1956, in Oujda, Morocco, to a Moroccan Jewish mother and a German Catholic father. Her father, a soldier, was declared missing around the time of her birth, and she was raised by her mother; although her mother was Jewish, Henkel was brought up in the Catholic faith. She spent her childhood in Morocco and mainly in Algeria, where she pursued higher education. Henkel earned a degree in international relations from the University of Oran in Algeria.

At the age of 18, Henkel entered an arranged marriage with her older brother’s best friend, Ahmed, despite her initial reluctance. Her husband was an Algerian engineer, and Henkel began working in the late 1970s at the U.S. Consulate in Oran. She eventually became a political and economic adviser to the U.S. ambassador in Algeria, a position she held for over a decade. In 1989, she was recognized by the U.S. State Department as the Foreign Service National employee of the year.

== Immigration and business career ==
In January 1990, Henkel fled Algeria with her family as the country was on the brink of civil war and Islamic extremist violence. Concerned for the safety of their children, especially their daughters, the family sought refuge in Canada. They arrived in Montreal, Quebec, during a winter snowstorm, bringing little money or resources. Despite her professional experience, Henkel struggled to find equivalent employment in Canada. For several years she worked in a series of odd jobs – including as a secretary and selling lunchboxes – earning much less than she had in Algeria and feeling "rejected and worthless" in her new country. Her husband was unable to secure work in his field, which put strain on their marriage; the couple eventually divorced, leaving Henkel as the sole provider for their four children.

In 1996, after six years of difficult integration into the workforce, Henkel decided to start her own business. Drawing on a traditional skincare tool from the Maghreb, she imported and marketed an exfoliating glove inspired by those used in Moroccan and Algerian bathhouses (hammams). She named the product the "gant Renaissance" ("Renaissance Glove") and began by personally pitching it to beauty salons around Montreal. Educating consumers who were unfamiliar with body exfoliation was initially challenging—Henkel later recalled being told by skeptics that "in Quebec we wear winter gloves, not exfoliating gloves." Nevertheless, she persisted and sold her products salon by salon, sometimes going door-to-door until she met a daily sales target. The Renaissance Glove proved successful and built a loyal customer base, which led Henkel to formally establish her company, *Entreprises Danièle Henkel Inc.*, in 1997.

Over the following years, Henkel expanded her business into a broader health and beauty enterprise. Her company introduced a line of cosmetics and cosmeceuticals and became a distributor of non-invasive medico-aesthetic devices (such as machines for skin and body treatments). In 2007, she also founded a laboratory for food intolerance testing, which was reportedly the first in Canada capable of screening for hundreds of potential intolerances. By 2010, Danièle Henkel Inc. was ranked among the 100 top-performing mid-sized companies in Canada. Henkel’s entrepreneurial success made her a multimillionaire and a well-known figure in Quebec’s business community.

In addition to running her company, Henkel authored two autobiographical books about her life and business philosophy: Quand l’intuition trace la route (“When Intuition Paves the Way”) in 2013 and Au cœur de mes valeurs (“At the Heart of My Values”) in 2015. Both books became local bestsellers. In 2018, she launched a digital media platform called *DanièleHenkel.tv* (Henkel Media) dedicated to entrepreneurship and “well-being” content, with the aim of supporting and networking the entrepreneurial community in Quebec and the Francophonie. Henkel has also toured as a public speaker, giving motivational talks based on her life story and advocating for personal and professional empowerment.

== Media and public profile ==
Henkel gained national prominence in 2012 when she joined the cast of Radio-Canada’s reality TV series Dans l'œil du dragon (the Quebec adaptation of the business show Dragons' Den). She was one of the five original investor-panelists (known as "dragons") on the program, and notably the only woman on the panel. Over the next five seasons (2012–2016), Henkel appeared on the show and became a familiar television personality in Quebec, often praised as a role model for women entrepreneurs. She was the only dragon to appear in all of the first five seasons. In 2016, at the start of the show's fifth season, Henkel announced that she would be stepping down after that season to pursue other endeavors. Her presence on Dans l’œil du dragon significantly raised her public profile and endeared her to many viewers.

Henkel has been a regular columnist and commentator on entrepreneurship. In the mid-2010s, she contributed a series of opinion columns on business and leadership to the journal Les Affaires in Montreal. As a public speaker (conférencière), she has addressed audiences in Canada and internationally on topics such as entrepreneurship, education, diversity, and women in business. She is frequently invited to speak in countries in Europe, North Africa, and the Middle East about her experiences and views as a female business leader.

== Community involvement and advocacy ==
Henkel has been active in mentoring and community initiatives, often focusing on women’s empowerment and health causes. In 2003, she established the Académie Danièle Henkel, a professional training academy to improve the skills of practitioners in the medical-aesthetics field across Canada. She has long been involved with various charitable and non-profit organizations. For example, she has lent her support or leadership to Dress for Success (a charity helping women enter the workforce), the Quebec Lung Association, Sclérodermie Québec, CARE Canada, Fondation Émergence (an LGBTQ advocacy group), and Leucan (a pediatric cancer support organization). For her contributions to entrepreneurship education, she served as an ambassador of economic francophonie for the Conseil du patronat du Québec (Quebec Employers' Council) and for the Alliance des patronats francophones des Amériques. She has also been the patron (marraine) of the Quebec Cancer Foundation.

Henkel has held multiple governance roles in business and community organizations. She sat on the board of directors of the Réseau Mentorat (formerly the Fondation de l’entrepreneurship mentorship network) and the board of the Armand-Frappier Foundation, which supports public health research. In the international sphere, she was a member of the Canada–Algeria Business Development Council (Conseil de développement Canada–Algérie), fostering economic ties between her two countries of familiarity. In April 2015, Henkel was appointed by Montreal mayor Denis Coderre as the president of the board of the Société du parc Jean-Drapeau, the agency managing Montreal’s Parc Jean-Drapeau. She served a three-year term in that role, during which the park undertook major projects for Montreal’s 375th anniversary. Henkel has frequently emphasized the importance of education, diversity, and “the power of women” in her public initiatives, and she continues to mentor young entrepreneurs.

== Senate career ==
On February 14, 2025, Danièle Henkel was appointed to the Senate of Canada on the recommendation of Prime Minister Justin Trudeau. She was named to fill a vacant Quebec seat (Senate division of Alma) that had been previously held by Diane Bellemare. Henkel’s appointment was part of the reformed independent selection process for the Senate; at the time of her appointment, she had no formal party affiliation. Shortly after joining the Senate, in April 2025, Henkel chose to sit with the Progressive Senate Group, one of the recognized caucus groups in the upper chamber. As a senator, she is expected to draw on her experience in business and community advocacy in her legislative role. Henkel’s term in the Senate will continue until she reaches the mandatory retirement age of 75 in 2031, unless she resigns earlier.

== Honours and recognition ==
- Chevalier of the Ordre national du Mérite (France, 2017): Henkel was awarded the rank of Knight of the National Order of Merit by the Government of France in 2017, in recognition of her contributions. The honor was presented to her in Paris by Mayor Anne Hidalgo, who praised Henkel’s unique life path.
- Médaille d’honneur of the National Assembly of Quebec (2018): In 2018, Henkel received the Medal of Honour of the National Assembly of Quebec, one of the province’s highest civilian distinctions, for her inspiring career and community engagement.
- Femme de mérite Award – Entrepreneur category (2014): Henkel was named the Entrepreneurial Woman of Distinction in 2014 by the YWCA of Montreal (Prix Femme de mérite, catégorie Entrepreneuriat), recognizing her business success and mentorship of women.
- Québec Businesswomen’s Award – International (2012): She received the Réseau des femmes d’affaires du Québec (RFAQ) Award in 2012 for Entrepreneur active internationally, honoring her expanding business reach beyond Canada.
- Canada’s Top 100 Most Powerful Women (2019): Henkel was named one of Canada’s 100 most influential or powerful women by the Women’s Executive Network (WXN) in 2019, recognizing her leadership and impact in business.

In addition, Henkel has received other awards and honors over the years, such as the Mercure Award for entrepreneurship (2005) and being named among the “Most Trusted CEOs” in Quebec in 2021 by the Institut de la crédibilité.

== Personal life ==
Danièle Henkel is the mother of four children, all of whom immigrated with her to Canada and later became involved in the family business. She has spoken often about the influence of her mother, Fortunée, in shaping her values and resilience. Henkel’s life story – from fleeing conflict in North Africa to achieving business success in Canada – has been cited as an inspiration for immigrants and women entrepreneurs. She became a Canadian citizen and is fluent in French, Arabic, and English.
