= Rosemary Moodie =

Canadian neonatal physician and politician

The Honourable Rosemary Moodie OOnt

Canadian Senator from Ontario
- Incumbent
- Assumed office December 12, 2018
- Nominated by: Justin Trudeau
- Appointed by: Julie Payette

Personal details
- Born: November 24, 1956 (age 69) Kingston, Jamaica
- Party: Independent
- Education: University of the West Indies (MBBS); University of Toronto (MBA); Queen's University at Kingston (MPP)

Rosemary Moodie OOnt is a Canadian neonatal physician who was appointed to the Senate of Canada on December 12, 2018. Moodie is a neonatologist at the Hospital for Sick Children and Professor of pediatrics at the University of Toronto's Department of Pediatrics.

== Early life and education ==
Rosemary Moodie was born and raised in Kingston, Jamaica. She attended St. Hugh's High School, and then completed a Bachelor of Medicine and Surgery at the University of the West Indies (1982). She pursued post-graduate studies in Pediatric and Neonatal medicine at the Hospital for Sick Children. She has also completed an MBA at the University of Toronto (2001) and a Master's in Public Policy and Administration at Queen's University.

== Career ==
Moodie has been practicing as a neonatologist at the Hospital for Sick Children for over 24 years, and is a Professor of pediatrics at the University of Toronto's Department of Pediatrics. Moodie is also a fellow of the Royal College of Physicians and Surgeons of Canada, and the American Academy of Paediatrics.

Moodie has previously served as the former corporate chief of paediatrics and medical director of the Rouge Valley Health System's regional maternal child program, a board director at St. Joseph's Hospital Centre and now Unity Health, Toronto, a board director of the Scotia Bank Jamaica Foundation, an international surveyor at Accreditation Canada and a healthcare consultant for SickKids International. During her three-year term as the president and board chair of YWCA Toronto, the YWCA Elm Centre (Canada's largest affordable housing project) was opened. She has also served as a torchbearer in the 2015 Pan Am/Parapan Am Games.

On 12 December 2018, following Prime Minister Justin Trudeau's nomination, Julie Payette (the Governor General of Canada) appointed Moodie as an independent senator to fill vacancies in the Senate. She was chair of the Canadian Senate Standing Committee on Social Affairs, Science and Technology in the 45th Canadian Parliament.

== Personal life ==
Moodie is married to Dr. Peter Wong, a pediatric cardiologist and researcher. Moodie has two sons, Nicholas and Jonathan Wong. In 2016, Moodie and her son Jon both received awards from the African Canadian Achievement Awards of Excellence - the first to happen in the organization's 31-year history. She is the daughter of Allenby and Gloria Moodie.

== Awards ==
- Order of Ontario (2020)
- Faculty of Medicine Dean's Alumni Award - Lifetime Achievement Award, University of Toronto (2020)
- Viola Desmond Honouree Award, Ryerson University (2020)
- 120 Year Anniversary St. Hugh's High School for Girls, Excellence in Alumni (2019)
- 100 Accomplished Black Canadian (ABC) Women Honouree (2018)
- The Government of Jamaica's Order of Distinction – Commander Rank (2017)
- Distinguished Canadian Community Paediatrician Award, Canadian Paediatric Society, Canada (2016)
- African Canadian Achievement Awards Excellence in Science Award Recipient (2016)
- Presidential Award, Ontario Medical Association, Ontario, Canada (2015)
- Council Award, Honouring Outstanding Ontario Physicians, The College of Physicians and Surgeons of Ontario, Canada (2015)
- University of Toronto Alumni Association's Carl Mitchell Award for Community Engagement (2015)
- Harry Jerome Award in Health Sciences (2014)
- City of Toronto Access, Equity, and Human Rights Award - Constance E. Hamilton Award for the Status Of Women (2014)
- Royal College of Physicians and Surgeons of Canada's Prix d'excellence – Specialist of the Year
- RBC's Top 25 Canadian Immigrant Award (2012)
- Harry Jerome Health Sciences Award, Black Business Professional Association, Canada (2013)

== Bibliography ==
- Wong JP, Venu I, Moodie RG, Cuddalore Arivudainambi V, Stewart H, Nicolae A, Zweig KN, van den Heuvel M, Ford-Jones EL, Wong PD. Breastfeeding: Brushing up on oral health. (Accepted for publication on 24 July 2017). Journal of Family Practice 2017.
- Venu I, van den Heuvel M, Wong JP, Berkhoff CM, Feller A, Moodie RG, Ford-Jones EL, Wong PD. The Breastfeeding Paradox: Relevance for Household Food Insecurity. Paediatrics and Child Health 2017. 22:4, 180–3.
- Au VA, Wong JP, Venu I, Moodie RG, Etoom Y, Kieswetter L, Gerstle JT, Wong PD. Failing to thrive, abdominal pain, and vomiting: A hairy situation. (Accepted for publication 20 June 2017) Paediatrics and Child Health 2017.
- Wong JP, Cuddalore Arivudainambi V, Venu I, Etoomb Y, Moodie RG, Wong PD. A 6-Week-Old Girl with Weak Cry and Cardiac Murmur. Paediatric and Child Health 2017. 22:4, 177–8.
- Wong PD, Dave MG, Tulloch T, Feldman ML, Ford-Jones EL, Parkin PC, Moodie RG. Community Health Centres – Potential opportunities of community paediatrics: From multidisciplinary clinical care to Board Governance. Paediatrics and Child Health 2015, 20(1): 12–14.
