= Margaret Dawn Anderson =

Canadian politician (born 1967)

The Honourable Margaret D. Anderson

Canadian Senator from the Northwest Territories
- Incumbent
- Assumed office 12 December 2018
- Nominated by: Justin Trudeau
- Appointed by: Julie Payette
- Preceded by: Nick Sibbeston

Personal details
- Born: Margaret Dawn Anderson; 14 April 1967 (age 59) Tuktoyaktuk, Northwest Territories, Canada
- Party: Conservative Party of Canada
- Other political affiliations: Progressive Senate Group (until 2025)
- Profession: Civil Servant, Activist

Margaret Dawn Anderson (born 14 April 1967) is a Canadian politician and former civil servant of Inuvialuit descent. She was appointed to the Senate of Canada on 12 December 2018.

== Biography ==
Anderson was born in Tuktoyaktuk. A longtime civil servant in the territorial government of the Northwest Territories, she has worked for the departments of justice and health and social services, in areas such as social work, probation, parole, restorative justice and domestic violence.

She was appointed to the Senate in 2018. She was a member of the Progressive Senate Group from 2021 to 2025. In 2025, she joined the Conservative caucus, while stating she was not a member of the federal party.

== Call for review ==
In May 2022, together with two other senators, Senator Anderson issued a report calling for a review of the convictions of 12 indigenous women, including the Quewezance sisters, and their exoneration.
