= Diane Bellemare =

Canadian politician

The Honourable Diane Bellemare

Canadian Senator from Quebec (Alma)
- In office September 6, 2012 – October 13, 2024
- Nominated by: Stephen Harper
- Appointed by: David Johnston
- Preceded by: W. David Angus
- Succeeded by: Danièle Henkel

Deputy Representative of the Government in the Senate
- In office March 23, 2016 – November 14, 2019
- Leader: Peter Harder
- Preceded by: Position established
- Succeeded by: Raymonde Gagné

Personal details
- Born: October 13, 1949 (age 76)
- Party: Progressive Senate Group (2021-present), Independent Senators Group (2019-2021), Non-affiliated (2016–2019), Conservative Party of Canada (2012–2016)
- Other political affiliations: Action démocratique du Québec (2003–2008)

Diane Bellemare (born October 13, 1949) is a Canadian economist and parliamentarian from Quebec, who was appointed to the Senate of Canada on September 6, 2012 and served until she reached the mandatory retirement age of 75 on October 13, 2024.

From September 2003 to April 2007, she held executive jobs with the Conseil du patronat du Québec, including Senior Vice-President and Chief Economist from April 2006 to April 2007.

Bellemare was appointed to the Senate by Governor General David Johnston on the advice of Prime Minister Stephen Harper and sat as a member of the Conservative Party of Canada caucus until March 2016 when she resigned to sit as an Independent. In May 2016, she was appointed Deputy Government Representative to the Senate by Government Representative Peter Harder.

On November 14, 2019, on the same day that the Senate Liberal Caucus dissolved and was succeeded by the Progressive Senate Group, Senator Bellemare left her position and joined the ISG.

On September 17, 2021, Senator Bellemare joined the Progressive Senate Group.
