= Yvonne Boyer =

Canadian lawyer and senator (born 1953)

The Honourable Yvonne Boyer

Canadian Senator from Ontario
- Incumbent
- Assumed office March 15, 2018
- Nominated by: Justin Trudeau
- Appointed by: Julie Payette

Personal details
- Born: October 25, 1953 (age 72)
- Party: Independent Senators Group
- Profession: Politician; lawyer; nurse; professor; administrator

Yvonne Boyer (born October 25, 1953) is a Canadian lawyer who was named to the Senate of Canada on March 25, 2018, as a senator for Ontario by Prime Minister Justin Trudeau. A Métis, Boyer is the first Indigenous person appointed to the Senate from Ontario. She lives in Merrickville, Ontario, near Ottawa.

== Background ==
As a lawyer and former nurse for two decades working in Alberta and Saskatchewan, Boyer has been outspoken in her criticisms of inequities in Canada's health care in its treatment of and availability to Indigenous peoples.

Boyer is a member of the Métis Nation and has ancestral roots in the Métis Nation of Saskatchewan and Red River, Manitoba. As well as being a lawyer, at the time of her appointment to the Upper House she was a professor in the law faculty at the University of Ottawa and associate director at the school's Centre for Health Law, Policy and Ethics. She is also a former member of the Canadian Human Rights Commission and has also served as in-house counsel for the Native Women's Association of Canada, and as a senior policy analyst and legal adviser at the National Aboriginal Health Organization.

Boyer's appointment to the Senate was recommended by the Independent Advisory Board for Senate Appointments.

== Activity ==
In May 2022 together with two other senators Senator Boyer issued a report calling for a review of the convictions of 12 indigenous women, including the Quewezance sisters, and their exoneration.

In June 2022, she introduced Bill S-250 in the Senate, which would make coercing or forcing a person to be sterilized a criminal offence punishable by up to 14 years in jail.
