= Renée Dupuis =

Canadian politician (born 1949)

The Honourable Renée Dupuis

Canadian Senator from Quebec
- In office November 10, 2016 – January 17, 2024
- Nominated by: Justin Trudeau
- Appointed by: David Johnston
- Preceded by: Michel Rivard
- Succeeded by: Pierre Moreau

Personal details
- Born: January 17, 1949 (age 77)
- Party: Independent Senators Group
- Profession: Lawyer

Renée Dupuis (born January 17, 1949) is a Canadian lawyer and a retired independent member of the Senate of Canada. Dupuis specialized in Canadian administrative law, Human rights law, and Canadian Indigenous law. She was chosen for appointment to the Senate on November 2, 2016, by Prime Minister Justin Trudeau.

Dupuis has been a legal advisor and consultant for First Nations organizations in negotiating tripartite comprehensive claims and in constitutional negotiations. She chaired the Indian Specific Claims Commission, a federal commission of inquiry, and the Barreau du Québec's committee on the rights of Aboriginal peoples.

She was appointed the vice-president of the Commission on Human Rights and Youth Rights of Quebec in 2011, was a member of the Canadian Human Rights Act Review Panel and served as a commissioner with the Canadian Human Rights Commission.

In 2001, she won the Governor General's Award for French-language non-fiction in 2001 for her book “Justice for Canada’s Aboriginal Peoples.”
