= Raymonde Gagné =

Canadian politician and academic (born 1956)

The Honourable Raymonde Gagné CM OM
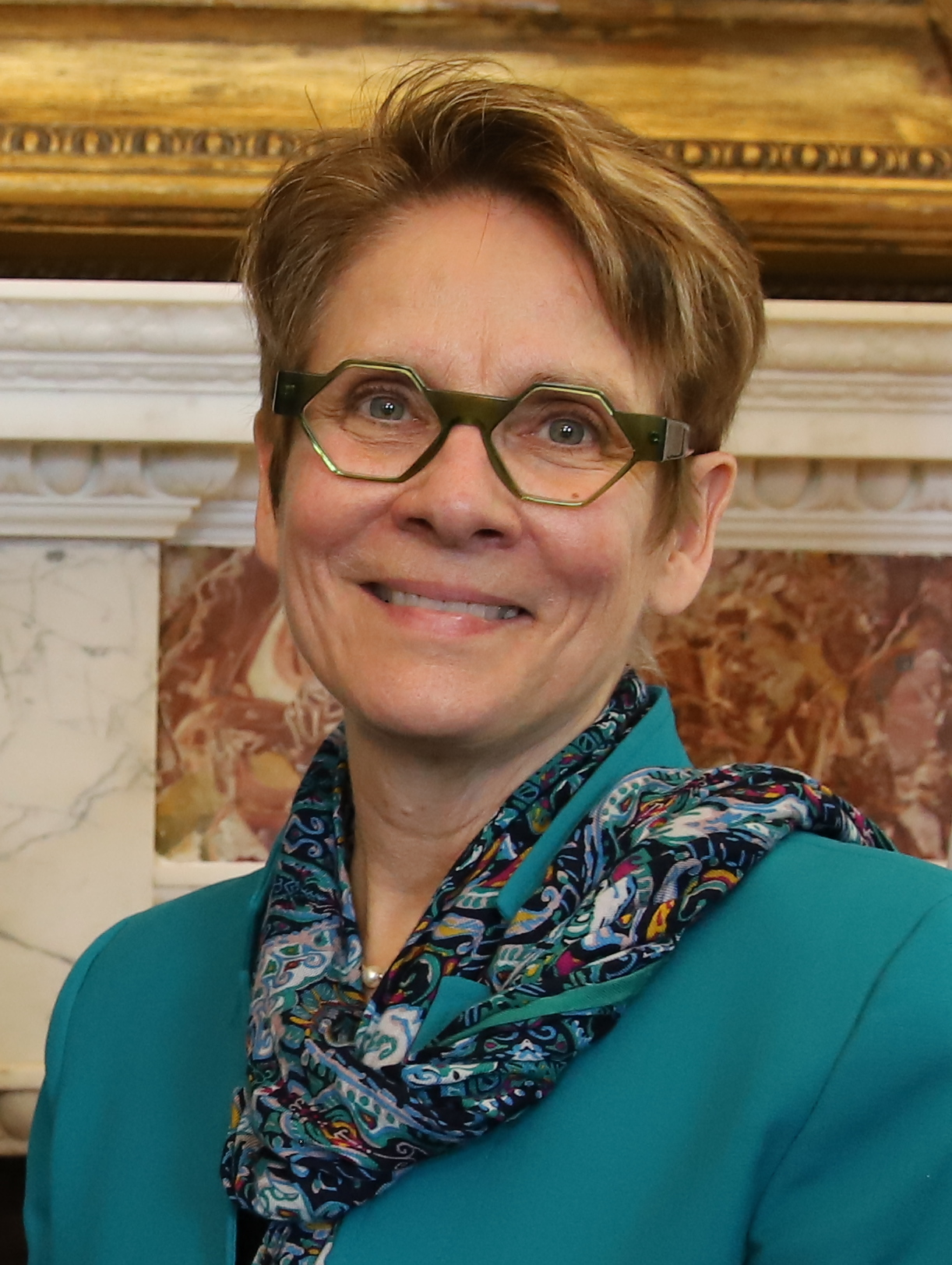
- Gagné in 2024

Speaker of the Senate of Canada
- Incumbent
- Assumed office May 12, 2023
- Nominated by: Justin Trudeau
- Appointed by: Mary Simon
- Preceded by: George Furey

Canadian Senator from Manitoba
- Incumbent
- Assumed office March 18, 2016
- Nominated by: Justin Trudeau
- Appointed by: David Johnston
- Preceded by: Terry Stratton

Deputy Representative of the Government in the Senate
- In office January 31, 2020 – May 12, 2023
- Leader: Marc Gold
- Preceded by: Diane Bellemare
- Succeeded by: Patti LaBoucane-Benson

Personal details
- Born: January 7, 1956 (age 70) St-Pierre-Jolys, Manitoba, Canada
- Party: Non-affiliated (since 2020)
- Other political affiliations: Independent Senators Group (2016–2020)

Raymonde Gagné CM OM (French pronunciation: [ʁɛmɔ̃d ɡaɲe]; born January 7, 1956) is a Canadian politician and academic who has served as the speaker of the Senate of Canada since May 12, 2023. She was named to the Senate of Canada to represent Manitoba on March 18, 2016.

== Background ==
Prior to her appointment to the Senate, Gagné worked in the education field. She worked as a high school teacher and principal and was a longtime faculty member of the Université de Saint-Boniface in Winnipeg, serving as president of the school between 2003 and 2014.

Gagné contributes to numerous organizations and boards within Manitoba and across Canada. She served as President of the Association of Colleges and Universities of the Canadian Francophonie from 2005 to 2009, was a member of the Advisory Committee on Official Languages for the Office of the Commissioner of Official Languages of Canada from 2007 to 2009.

== Political career ==
Gagné was appointed to the Senate by Prime Minister Justin Trudeau on March 18, 2016. However, she chose to sit as a member of the Independent Senators Group.

On January 31, 2020, she was appointed Deputy to Representative of the Government in the Senate Marc Gold. Upon this appointment she left the ISG, becoming designated as non-affiliated with any Senate political group.

=== Speaker of the Senate ===
On May 12, 2023, Gagné was named Speaker of the Senate by Prime Minister Justin Trudeau following the retirement of George Furey, becoming the third female Speaker of the Senate and the first since Renaude Lapointe who served as speaker from 1974 to 1979.

== Honours and awards ==
In May 2014, Gagné was recognized with the Order of Manitoba.

On November 20, 2014, Gagné was awarded the Order of Canada and was invested as a Member of the Order of Canada on September 23, 2015, for services to education and social services. She also received the Prix Riel in the community development category in 2015.

She is also the recipient of the Queen Elizabeth II Diamond Jubilee Medal.

Political offices
Preceded by George Furey	Speaker of the Senate of Canada; 2023–present	Incumbent
Order of precedence
Preceded by Beverley McLachlin as Former Chief Justice	Order of Precedence of Canada as Speaker of the Senate of Canada	Succeeded by Francis Scarpaleggia as Speaker of the House of Commons
