= Kim Pate =

Canadian politician

The Honourable Kim Pate CM
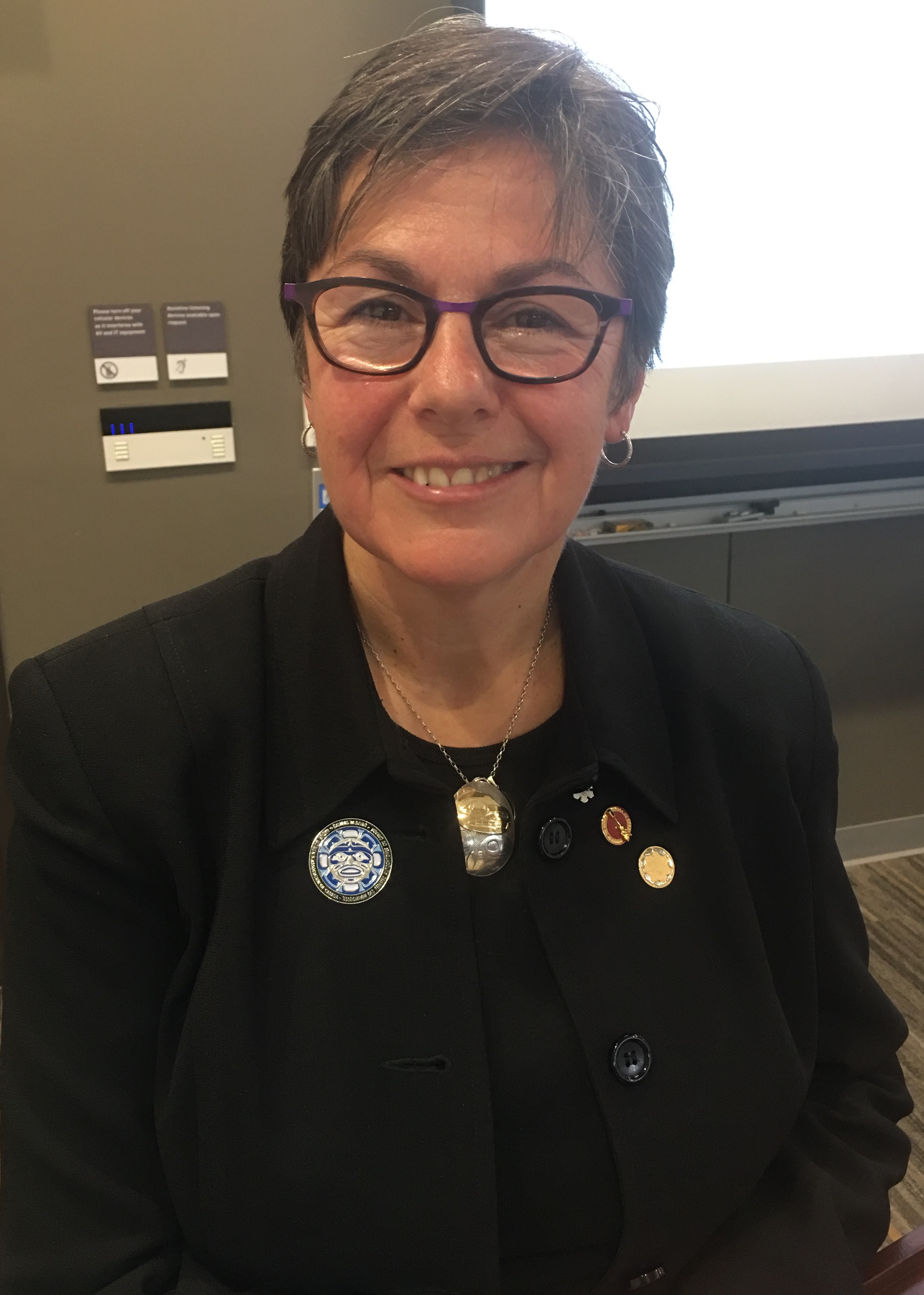
- Senator Pate in October 2017

Canada Senator from Ontario
- Incumbent
- Assumed office November 10, 2016
- Nominated by: Justin Trudeau
- Appointed by: David Johnston

Personal details
- Born: November 10, 1959 (age 66)
- Party: Independent Senators Group

Kimberly Pate CM (born November 10, 1959) is a Canadian politician who has served as a senator from Ontario since November 10, 2016, sitting with the Independent Senators Group (ISG) caucus. Pate was appointed on the advice of Prime Minister Justin Trudeau.

== Background ==
Pate grew up in a military family and attended the University of Victoria, graduating with a Bachelor of Arts in 1980. She later graduated from Dalhousie Law School in 1984 with honours in the Clinical Law Programme and has completed post graduate work in the area of forensic mental health. In 2014, she was named a member of the Order of Canada for advocating on behalf of women who are marginalized, victimized or incarcerated, and for her research on women in the criminal justice system. Pate is a former executive director of the Canadian Association of Elizabeth Fry Societies. In 2011 she was a recipient of the Governor General's Award in Commemoration of the Persons Case.

On October 31, 2016, it was announced that Prime Minister Justin Trudeau would recommend that she be appointed to the Senate of Canada. She will sit as an independent. Pate assumed office on November 10, 2016.

== Activity ==
In May 2022 together with two other senators Senator Anderson issued a report calling for a review of the convictions of 12 indigenous women, including the Quewezance sisters, and their exoneration.

She is out as lesbian, and is a member of the Canadian Pride Caucus, a non-partisan committee of Canada's LGBTQ MPs and senators.
