= Rosa Galvez =

Canadian politician

The Honourable Rosa Galvez
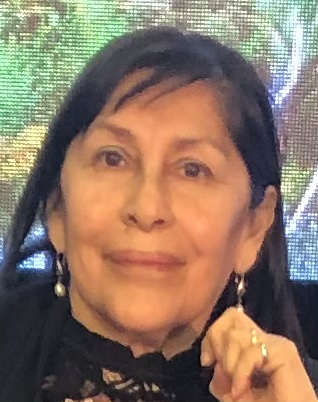

Canadian Senator from Quebec
- Incumbent
- Assumed office December 6, 2016
- Nominated by: Justin Trudeau
- Appointed by: David Johnston
- Preceded by: Céline Hervieux-Payette

Personal details
- Born: June 21, 1961 (age 65) Peru
- Party: Independent Senators Group
- Education: McGill University
- Profession: Environmental engineer Professor
- Website: https://rosagalvez.ca/en/about/senator-rosa-galvez/

Rosa Galvez (born June 21, 1961) is a Canadian Senator representing Québec (Bedford). An expert in pollution and its effects on human health, she was appointed to the Senate on December 6, 2016., Galvez established its environmental research laboratory.

== Early life and education ==
Rosa Galvez was born in Peru.

She first became interested in science at age ten when she chose to do a school assignment on pollution in Mexico City. Her interest led her to go beyond library research when she reached out to her town's municipality to learn about local waste management.

Galvez earned her Bachelor of Civil Engineering at the National University of Engineering in Lima, Peru in 1985. After immigrating to Canada, she earned both her Master of Science (M.Sc.), Environmental Engineering Technology in 1989 and then her Doctor of Philosophy (Ph.D.) in Geotechnical and Geoenvironmental Engineering in 1994 from McGill University.

== Career ==
Galvez worked briefly for the Ministry of Housing in Lima, Peru and received professional training at Sedapal (Servicio de Agua Potable y Alcantarillado de Lima). There she became interested in the remediation of contaminated sites. She worked with the Pan-American Center for Sanitary Engineering (Centro Panamericano de Ingenieria Sanitaria, CEPIS, of the World Health Organization, WHO), before moving to Canada in March 1986.

In 1994, Galvez joined the Department of Civil and Water Engineering at Laval University and served as head of the department from 2010 to 2016. She established an environmental research laboratory at Laval and raised $90 million for faculty research funding.

Galvez was nominated to the Senate on December 6, 2016, on the advice of Justin Trudeau, the Prime Minister of Canada. Galvez is President of the ParlAmericas Parliamentary Network on Climate Change and Sustainability (PNCCS). She has been an official participant at COP25, COP26 and COP27. At COP25 in Madrid, Spain she was part of the delegation for the Executive Committee of PNCCS. At COP26 she was a signatory of a call "to empower all members of society to engage in climate action". As well as attending COP27, Galvez participated as a panellist at the GLOBE COP27 Legislators Summit.

== Research and policy ==
Galvez' academic research has focused on the area of pollution. Areas of specialization include decontamination of water and soil, management of hazardous waste, wastewater, municipal solid waste and residues, and assessments of environmental impact and risk. She has advised community and governmental organizations at local, national and international levels.

Major contributions include advising the Commission for Environmental Cooperation on international agreements between Canada and the United States and Quebec and Vermont to protect the Great Lakes and the St. Lawrence River. She has also worked to protect Lake Champlain. Société Radio-Canada nicknamed her “La Dame du Lac” for her work on the restoration of Lac Saint-Augustin.

Galvez has studied the 2013 Lac-Mégantic rail disaster and resulting oil spill, in which 6.3 million litres of light crude oil contaminated air, water and soil. Her research on this catastrophic event, its remediation, and the preparedness of cities to deal with unconventional oil emergencies has been internationally recognized.

For her work on the restoration of Lac Saint-Augustin, Société Radio-Canada nicknamed her “La Dame du Lac”.

For the Government of the Northwest Territories, Galvez has conducted studies of mining and land sustainability. She has discussed cumulative impacts of the John Horgan Dam, a hydroelectric project on the Mackenzie River watershed proposed by British Columbia.

She has received research funding from the Natural Sciences and Engineering Research Council of Canada and others. Research grant areas include:

- Advanced study of unconventional oil behaviour, innovative emergency measures to surface water oil spills: protection of water sources (September 30, 2016, to September 29, 2019)
- Centre de recherche sur l'eau (CentrEau) (May 1, 2017 – April 30, 2022)
- Effective implementation of sustainable remediation by the use of novel eco-processes and emerging genomic tools (April 1, 2017 – March 31, 2022)
- Institut Hydro-Québec en environnement, développement et société (IHQEDS), (May 1, 2011, to April 30, 2019)
- Knowledge Network on Mining Encounters and Indigenous Sustainable Livelihoods: Cross-Perspectives from the Circumpolar North and Melanesia/Australia (MinErAL) (April 1, 2016 – March 31, 2022)
- Lac Mégantic : évaluation stratégique de l'urgence environnementale, outils intégrés d'évaluation des impacts cumulatifs, transformation et transport de contaminants (April 1, 2015 to March 31, 2018)
- Suivi environnemental de la mise en lumière du pont Jacques-Cartier, (December 19, 2016 – March 11, 2019)
- Valorisation des plastiques de la collecte sélective en matériaux composites - Étude de cas chez Gaudreau Environnement Inc. (January 1, 2015 – July 27, 2018)

As a Senator, she has led the creation of white papers on aligning Canadian finance with climate commitments (2023), recovering from the COVID-19 pandemic, and Canada's building code in the context of climate change, adaptation, and sustainability (2019).

Galvez sponsored the Canadian Net-Zero Emissions Accountability Act, which was adopted in June 2021. Galvez has proposed Bill S-243, the Climate-Aligned Finance Act, in hopes of creating dialogue about the finance sector's potential to attract capital for transitioning to a low-carbon economy. The Bill highlights the increasing risks associated with the Canadian financial sector's “wait and see approach” to addressing climate change, and proposes eight recommendations for financial institutions.

== Awards ==
Rosa Galvez has received many awards, including the following:

- 2023, Honorary Fellow, Canadian Academy of Engineering
- 2023, Top 25 Women of Influence, Women of Influence+
- 2022, Regional Policy Award, Ecological Society of America (ESA)
- 2021, Clean50 Award for the Public Sector
- 2021, Elected Chair, Parliamentary Network on Climate Change (PNCCS), ParlAmericas
- 2019, Fellow, Canadian Society for Civil Engineering (CSCE)
- 2018, Meritorious Service Award for Professional Service, Engineers Canada
- Member, Ordre des ingénieurs du Québec
- Member, Consejo Científico Tecnológico Internacional (CCTI) del Encuentro Científico Internacional
- Member, Engineers Without Borders

== Selected publications ==
=== White papers ===
- Galvez, Rosa; Addas, Amr; Péloffy, Karine; Rose, Sandy (October 2023). 2023 Update: Aligning Canadian Finance with Climate Commitments (PDF). Office of Senator Rosa Galvez.
- Galvez, Rosa; Zrinyi, Nick; Péloffy, Karine; Laviolette, Stéphane (2020). Building Forward Better: A Clean and Just Recovery from the COVID-19 Pandemic | Senator Rosa Galvez. Office of The Honourable Rosa Galvez, Senate of Canada.
- Zrinyi, Nick (2019). Canada's Building Code in the Context of Climate Change, Adaptation, and Sustainability | Senator Rosa Galvez (PDF). Office of The Honourable Rosa Galvez, Senate of Canada.

=== Books ===
- Cledon, Maximiliano; Brar, Satinder Kaur; Galvez, Rosa; Oyanedel-Craver, Vinka, eds. (2018). Integrated and sustainable environmental remediation. Washington, DC: American Chemical Society. ISBN 978-0841233676.

=== Journal papers and book chapters ===
- Laadila, Mohamed Amine; Hegde, Krishnamoorthy; Rouissi, Tarek; Brar, Satinder Kaur; Galvez, Rosa; Sorelli, Luca; Cheikh, Ridha Ben; Paiva, Maria; Abokitse, Kofi (2017). "Green synthesis of novel biocomposites from treated cellulosic fibers and recycled bio-plastic polylactic acid". Journal of Cleaner Production. 164: 575–586. Bibcode:2017JCPro.164..575L. doi:10.1016/j.jclepro.2017.06.235. hdl:1822/52588. ISSN 0959-6526.
- Lassabatere, Laurent; Spadini, Lorenzo; Delolme, Cécile; Galvez, Rosa; Winiarski, T. (2017). "Modeling the effect of flow homogeneity on the fate of Cd, Pb and Zn in a calcareous soil". EGU General Assembly Conference Abstracts. 19: 3171. Bibcode:2017EGUGA..19.3171L.
- de Santiago-Martín, Ana; Guesdon, Gaëlle; Galvez, Rosa (2016). "Plants for Constructed Wetlands as an Ecological Engineering Alternative to Road Runoff Desalination". In Ansari, A.A.; Singh Gill, S.; Gill, R.; Lanza, G.R.; Newman, L. (eds.). Phytoremediation: Management of Environmental Contaminants. Vol. 4. Springer International Publishing. pp. 233–266.
- de Santiago-Martín, A.; Michaux, A.; Guesdon, G.; Constantin, B.; Despréaux, M.; Galvez-Cloutier, R. (October 2016). "Potential of anthracite, dolomite, limestone and pozzolan as reactive media for de-icing salt removal from road runoff". International Journal of Environmental Science and Technology. 13 (10): 2313–2324. Bibcode:2016JEST...13.2313D. doi:10.1007/s13762-016-1085-1.
- Guesdon, Gaëlle; de Santiago-Martín, Ana; Galvez-Cloutier, Rosa (October 2016). "Phytodesalinization potential of Typha angustifolia, Juncus maritimus, and Eleocharis palustris for removal of de-icing salts from runoff water". Environmental Science and Pollution Research. 23 (19): 19634–19644. Bibcode:2016ESPR...2319634G. doi:10.1007/s11356-016-7176-1.
- Guesdon, Gaëlle; De Santiago-Martín, Ana; Raymond, Sébastien; Messaoud, Hamdi; Michaux, Arthur; Roy, Samuel; Galvez, Rosa (11 July 2016). "Impacts of Salinity on Saint-Augustin Lake, Canada: Remediation Measures at Watershed Scale". Water. 8 (7): 285. doi:10.3390/w8070285.
- Kagambega, N.; Galvez-Cloutier, R.; Ouattara, A.; Laflamme, M. (2014). "Assessment of the Neutralizing Capacity of High Purity Dolomite on the Highly Polluted Acid Mine Drainage". International Journal of Environmental Engineering and Natural Resources. 1 (3): 120–129.
- Santiago-Martín, Ana de; Constantin, Boris; Guesdon, Gaëlle; Kagambega, Nicolas; Raymond, Sébastien; Galvez-Cloutier, Rosa (January 2016). "Bioavailability of Engineered Nanoparticles in Soil Systems". Journal of Hazardous, Toxic and Radioactive Waste. 20 (1). doi:10.1061/(ASCE)HZ.2153-5515.0000263.
- Galvez-Cloutier, Rosa; Guesdon, Gaëlle; Fonchain, Amandine (2014). "Lac-Mégantic : analyse de l'urgence environnementale, bilan et évaluation des impacts". Canadian Journal of Civil Engineering. 41 (6): 531–539. doi:10.1139/cjce-2014-0011.
- Kamal, N.; Galvez, R.; Buelna, G. (2014). "Application of a solid phase extraction-HPLC method to quantify phenolic compounds in woodwaste leachate". Water Quality Research Journal of Canada. 49 (3): 210–222. doi:10.2166/wqrjc.2014.002.
- Alves, Barbara S. Q.; Dungan, Robert S.; Carnin, Raquel L. P.; Galvez, Rosa; de Carvalho Pinto, Catia R. S. (May 2014). "Metals in Waste Foundry Sands and an Evaluation of Their Leaching and Transport to Groundwater". Water, Air, & Soil Pollution. 225 (5): 1963. Bibcode:2014WASP..225.1963A. doi:10.1007/s11270-014-1963-4.
- Morteau, Bertrand; Triffault-Bouchet, Gaëlle; Galvez, Rosa; Martel, Louis (2015). "Nutrient and Removal Kinetics Impacts on Salt Phytoremediation by Atriplex patula and Typha angustifolia". Journal of Environmental Engineering. 141 (2). doi:10.1061/(ASCE)EE.1943-7870.0000889.
- Tornimbeni, Ombretta; Galvez, Rosa; Triffault-Bouchet, Gaëlle; Dassylva, Nathalie; Roberge, Steeve (2013). "Heavy metal concentrations in Cipangopaludina chinensis (Reeve, 1863) and relationships with sediments in Saint-Augustin Lake, Québec City (Qc, Canada)". Annales de Limnologie - International Journal of Limnology. 49 (1): 21–29. doi:10.1051/limn/2013034.
- Saminathan, S.; Galvez-Cloutier, Rosa; Kamal, N. (2013). "Performance and Microbial Diversity of Aerated Tricling Biofilter for treating Cheese Industry Wastewater". Applied Biochemistry and Biotechnology. 170 (1): 149–163. doi:10.1007/s12010-013-0148-8. PMID 23483408.
- Galvez, R. (2012) Two methods for the recovery of ecosystems affected by road runoff. In Drainage and stormwater management. Syntheses of best practices road salt management. Transportation Association of Canada: special issue on Synthesis of success in road salt management. 2-34.
- Galvez-Cloutier, Rosa; Saminathan, Sumathi K. M.; Boillot, Clotilde; Triffaut-Bouchet, Gaëlle; Bourget, Alexandre; Soumis-Dugas, Gabriel (May 2012). "An Evaluation of Several In-Lake Restoration Techniques to Improve the Water Quality Problem (Eutrophication) of Saint-Augustin Lake, Quebec, Canada". Environmental Management. 49 (5): 1037–1053. Bibcode:2012EnMan..49.1037G. doi:10.1007/s00267-012-9840-7. PMID 22476666.
- Morteau, B.; Triffault-Bouchet, G.; Galvez, R.; Martel, L.; Leroueil, S. (1 April 2009). "Treatment of Salted Road Runoffs Using Typha latifolia, Spergularia canadensis, and Atriplex patula : A Comparison of Their Salt Removal Potential". Journal of ASTM International. 6 (4): 1–7. doi:10.1520/JAI102173.
- Soumis-Dugas, Gabriel; Triffaut-Bouchet, Gaëlle; Galvez, Rosa; Martel, Louis (1 April 2009). "Ecotoxicological Assessment of an In-Lake Remediation Method". Journal of ASTM International. 6 (4): 1–14. doi:10.1520/JAI102181.
- Ellwood, Neil T. W.; Albertano, Patrizia; Galvez, Rosa; Funiciello, Renato; Mosello, Rosario (1 August 2009). "Water chemistry and trophic evaluation of Lake Albano (Central Italy): a four year water monitoring study". Journal of Limnology. 68 (2): 288–303. doi:10.4081/jlimnol.2009.288. ISSN 1723-8633.
- Galvez-Cloutier, Rosa; Sanchez, Michelle (1 November 2007). "Trophic Status Evaluation for 154 Lakes in Quebec, Canada: Monitoring and Recommendations". Water Quality Research Journal. 42 (4): 252–268. doi:10.2166/wqrj.2007.028.
- Lassabatere, Laurent; Spadini, Lorenzo; Delolme, Cécile; Février, Laureline; Galvez-Cloutier, Rosa; Winiarski, Thierry (November 2007). "Concomitant Zn–Cd and Pb retention in a carbonated fluvio-glacial deposit under both static and dynamic conditions". Chemosphere. 69 (9): 1499–1508. Bibcode:2007Chmsp..69.1499L. doi:10.1016/j.chemosphere.2007.04.053. PMID 17583773.
