= George Furey =

Canadian lawyer and politician

The Honourable George Furey PC KC
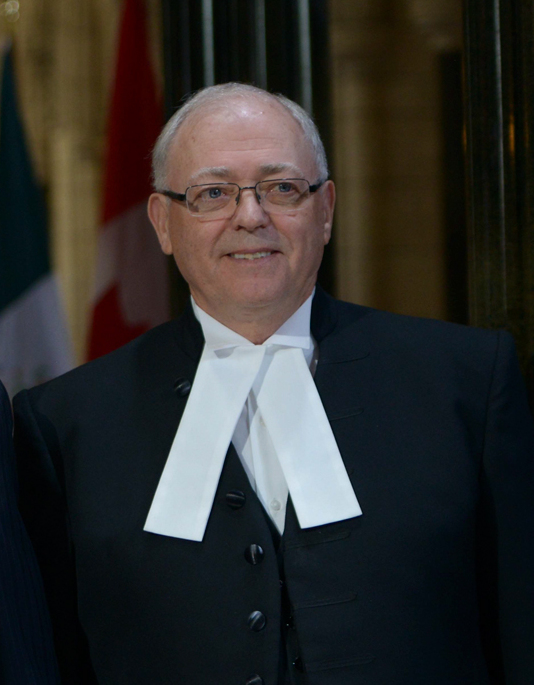
- Furey in 2016

Speaker of the Senate of Canada
- In office December 3, 2015 – May 12, 2023
- Nominated by: Justin Trudeau
- Appointed by: David Johnston
- Preceded by: Leo Housakos
- Succeeded by: Raymonde Gagné

Canadian Senator from Newfoundland and Labrador
- In office August 11, 1999 – May 12, 2023
- Nominated by: Jean Chrétien
- Appointed by: Roméo LeBlanc
- Preceded by: William Petten
- Succeeded by: Judy White

Personal details
- Born: May 12, 1948 (age 78) St. John's, Dominion of Newfoundland
- Party: Independent
- Other political affiliations: Liberal (until 2014); Independent Liberal (2014–2015)
- Children: 4 (including Andrew)
- Education: Memorial University of Newfoundland (BA, BEd, MEd); Dalhousie University (LLB)
- Occupation: Politician; teacher; lawyer

George J. Furey PC KC (born May 12, 1948) is a Canadian politician who served as the speaker of the Senate of Canada from 2015 to 2023. Furey was appointed as a senator from Newfoundland and Labrador in 1999 and was the longest-serving member of the Senate at the time of his retirement.

== Background ==
Furey earned a Bachelor of Arts Degree and a Bachelor of Education Degree from Memorial University in 1970. He also completed a Master of Education Degree from Memorial in 1976. After graduating, he worked as a teacher for the Roman Catholic School Board in St. John's from 1969 to 1972. From 1972 to 1978, Furey was a supervising vice principal with the Port-au-Port Roman Catholic School Board, and from 1978 to 1980 supervising principal of the Placentia-St. Mary's Roman Catholic School Board.

After a career in education, he went on to earn a law degree from Dalhousie University in 1983. He was called to the Newfoundland Bar in 1984. Furey was later named a partner at the St. John's law firm of O'Brien, Furey & Hurley. By 1989, he was a senior partner at the law firm of O'Brien, Furey & Smith. He was appointed as Queen's Counsel in 1996.

Furey volunteers for volunteer groups, professional boards, and provincial commissions, including the Newfoundland Teachers' Association, Scouts Canada, the St. Clare's Mercy Hospital Ethics Committee, the Gonzaga High School Council, and the Provincial Police Complaints Commission.

In 2020, Furey's son Andrew announced his candidacy for leader of the Liberal Party of Newfoundland and Labrador and was elected leader in August 2020, becoming the 14th Premier of Newfoundland and Labrador.

== Political career ==
Furey was named to the Senate of Canada by Prime Minister Jean Chrétien on August 11, 1999. As a senator, he was a member of several Senate committees and served as Chair of the Standing Committee on Internal Economy, Budgets and Administration and the Standing Committee on Legal and Constitutional Affairs.

On January 29, 2014, Liberal Party leader Justin Trudeau announced that the party's caucus in the Senate would be dissolved. Some former Liberals, including Furey, would maintain a caucus, styled the Senate Liberal Caucus, but with no formal affiliation with the main Liberal Party.

Following the retirement of David Tkachuk on February 18, 2020, he was the longest-serving member of the Senate until his own retirement. He was the last remaining senator that was appointed in the 20th century.

=== Speaker of the Senate ===
On December 3, 2015, Furey was appointed Speaker of the Senate by Prime Minister Justin Trudeau replacing Senator Leo Housakos. He resigned from the Senate Liberal Caucus upon assuming the speaker's chair.

As Speaker, Furey presided over a period of Senate reform. In his opening address, he highlighted a need for the Senate to reinvent itself and to fulfil its role, as intended by the Constitution, as an independent institution "of sober second thought".

Furey retired from the Senate and as Speaker on May 12, 2023, upon turning 75, the mandatory retirement age for senators.

== Honours ==
As is customary for former Speakers of the Senate, he was appointed to the King's Privy Council for Canada on the same day of his retirement. This gives him the right to the honorific prefix "The Honourable" and the post-nominal letters "PC" for life.

Political offices
| Preceded by Leo Housakos (acting) | Speaker of the Senate of Canada; 2015–2023 | Succeeded by Raymonde Gagné |
