= Michel Rivard (politician) =

Canadian politician (born 1941)

The Honourable Michel Rivard

Senator for The Laurentides, Quebec
- In office 2 January 2009 – 7 August 2016
- Nominated by: Stephen Harper
- Appointed by: Michaëlle Jean
- Preceded by: Madeleine Plamondon
- Succeeded by: Renée Dupuis

MNA for Limoilou
- In office 1994–1998
- Preceded by: Michel Després
- Succeeded by: Michel Després

Personal details
- Born: 7 August 1941 (age 85) Quebec City, Quebec
- Party: Non-affiliated
- Other political affiliations: Conservative (2008–2015); Canadian Alliance (2000); Parti Québécois (1994–1998)
- Education: Laval University

Michel Rivard (French pronunciation: [miʃɛl ʁivaʁ]; born 7 August 1941) is a Canadian politician, former senator, and former member of the National Assembly of Quebec.

== Career ==
Rivard holds a certificate in administrative sciences from Laval University. Throughout the 1970s, he held various managerial positions in the Quebec business world.

From 1980 to 1984, he was mayor of Beauport, and from 1985 to 1988 he was director of the Federation of Canadian Municipalities. From 1991 to 1994, he served on the executive committee of the Society of Economic Development for the Region of Quebec.

In the 1994 Quebec election, Rivard ran in the riding of Limoilou representing the Parti Québécois and was elected. He served in various backbench roles in the PQ government, including as Assistant to the Minister responsible for the Quebec region from 19 January 1996, to 28 October 1998. As a PQ member he campaigned for Quebec sovereignty during the 1995 Quebec referendum.

In the 1998 election, Rivard lost his seat to Liberal candidate Michel Després.

In the 2000 Canadian federal election, he attempted a political comeback running in the riding of Québec under the banner of the Canadian Alliance, a considerable departure from his previous political affiliation. He lost to Bloc Québécois candidate Christiane Gagnon.

In December 2008, he was appointed to the Senate of Canada as a Conservative by Canadian Prime Minister Stephen Harper. After being shut out of the 2015 federal election campaign, he quit the Tory caucus to sit as an independent.
