= Patti LaBoucane-Benson =

Canadian academic and politician

The Honourable Patti LaBoucane-Benson

Canadian Senator from Alberta
- Incumbent
- Assumed office October 3, 2018
- Nominated by: Justin Trudeau
- Appointed by: Julie Payette

Government Liaison in the Senate
- In office January 2020 – May 2023
- Leader: Marc Gold
- Preceded by: Grant Mitchell
- Succeeded by: Michele Audette

Legislative Deputy to the Government Representative in the Senate
- Incumbent
- Assumed office May 2023
- Leader: Marc Gold
- Preceded by: Raymonde Gagné

Personal details
- Born: February 20, 1969 (age 57)
- Party: non-affiliated (since 2020)
- Other political affiliations: Independent Senators Group (2018–2020)
- Profession: academic
- Website: senatorlaboucanebenson.sencanada.ca/en/

Patti LaBoucane-Benson (born February 20, 1969) is a Canadian academic and politician. A Métis, she served as the director of research, training and communications at Native Counselling Services of Alberta for nine years. She was appointed to represent Alberta in the Senate of Canada on October 3, 2018, on the advice of Prime Minister Justin Trudeau.

As of 2026 she serves as Legislative Deputy to the Government Representative in the Senate, a role she has held since May 2023. The purpose of this role is to structure debate in the Senate chamber on sitting days and help support the progress of government legislation. She is the first Indigenous woman to hold a leadership position in the Upper Chamber. She previously served as the Government Liaison.

In 2016, she won the Burt Award for First Nations, Métis and Inuit Literature for her graphic novel, The Outside Circle, which she cowrote with Kelly Mellings.

== Early life and education ==
LaBoucane-Benson is Ukrainian on her mother’s side. On her father’s side, her ancestor François Fournaise arrived in Canada from France around 1725. His grandson married an Indigenous woman named Suzanne in 1830. Over the generations, LaBoucane-Benson’s paternal family moved from Red River to White Plains, Manitoba; Battle River, Alberta, known for many years as the Laboucane Settlement; and ultimately St. Paul des Métis, where she was born and raised.

She has three degrees from the University of Alberta, including a PhD in Human Ecology, where her research focused on Aboriginal Family Resilience. Her PhD thesis was later adapted into an award-winning graphic novel, The Outside Circle, illustrated by Kelly Mellings.

== Career ==
LaBoucane-Benson served as executive director of the Boys and Girls Club in St. Paul for 2 years and worked for 23 years total at Native Counselling Services of Alberta (NCSA). She was also the conference director and lead facilitator of the Nelson Mandela Dialogues held on Enoch Cree Nation in 2017.

As an expert in historic-trauma-informed training and teaching, she was a lecturer and mentor in several departments at the University of Alberta, including: the Peter Lougheed Leadership College, Alberta School of Business Executive, and the Faculty of Native Studies and Alberta School of business. She has also done historic-trauma-informed client service delivery for Legal Aid Alberta, the City of Edmonton, Edmonton Public Library, and Edmonton Police Service, among other organizations.

At NCSA, LaBoucane-Benson also served as the director of the BearPaw Legal Education and Resource Centre, as well as the general and managing editor of Pimatisiwin Journal of Aboriginal and Indigenous Community Health.

As director of BearPaw Media Production at NCSA, LaBoucane-Benson was also involved in the production of many accessible education resources for and about Indigenous peoples. Some of the productions she was involved in include:

- Water: The Sacred Relationship
- Homefire
- Hidden Homelessness
- Journey Home
- Common Ground: Indigenous Law and Alberta Hunting and Fishing Regulations.[PL1]
- Wahkohtowin: Cree Natural Law.

In the Senate, LaBoucane-Benson sponsored Bill C-92 (Indigenous child welfare) and Bill C-15 (the United Nations Declaration on the Rights of Indigenous People).

On November 24, 2025, LaBoucane-Benson was voted Senator of the Year by iPolitics, an award that was voted on by 260 parliamentarians.

== The Outside Circle ==
The Outside Circle was published in 2015 in English and in 2023 in French. The story follows two Indigenous brothers affected by poverty, drug abuse, and gang violence, as they embark on a healing journey to understand the impact of generational trauma on their lives. It is a fictional story based on Dr. LaBoucane-Benson’s decades of research and work with incarcerated Indigenous men. It is a Globe and Mail National Best Seller.

== Publications ==
LaBoucane-Benson, P., Gibson, G., Benson, A., Miller, G. (2012). Are We Seeking Pimatisiwin or Creating Pomewin? Implications for Water Policy. The International Indigenous Policy Journal, 3(3). Retrieved from: http://ir.lib.uwo.ca/iipj/vol3/iss3/10

Ruttan, L., LaBoucane-Benson, P., Munro, B. (2012) Does a baby help? Does a Baby Help Young Women Transition Out of Homelessness? Motivation, Coping, and Parenting. Journal of Family Social Work. V15(1). 34-49.

Erickson, K., LaBoucane-Benson, P., Hossack, F. (2011) Creating a Path by Walking on It – A Year in Review of Pohna: Keepers of the Fire. Alberta Law Review. V 48 (4). 945-964.

Curry, C,. LaBoucane-Benson, P. (2011) Impacts of a Peer Support Program for Street-Involved Youth. . Pimatisiwin: A Journal of Indigenous and Aboriginal Community Health. 9(1). 177-192.

Ruttan, L., LaBoucane-Benson, P, & Munro, B. (2010) “Home and Native Land”: Aboriginal Young Women and

Homelessness in the City First Peoples Child & Family Review, Volume 5, Number 1, pp. 6777

Munro, B, LaBoucane-Benson, P, Ruttan, L. (2009). Creating Cultural Exchange Between Homeless Youth and University Students. International Journal of Interdisciplinary Social Sciences, 4 (5), 127-142

Ruttan, L, LaBoucane-Benson, P, Munro, B (2008). “A Story I Never Heard Before”: Aboriginal Young Women, Homelessness, and Restoring Connections. Pimatisiwin: A Journal of Indigenous and Aboriginal Community Health. 6(3).31-54.

Grekul, J, & LaBoucane-Benson P. (2008). Aboriginal Gangs and their (Dis)placement: Contextualizing Recruitment, Membership, and Status. Canadian Journal of Criminology and Criminal Justice. 50(1). 59-82.

Curry, C, LaBoucane-Benson, P. & Gibson, N. (2006). An evaluation of the Healing Our Spirit Worldwide conference 2006. Pimatisiwin: A Journal of Indigenous and Aboriginal Community Health. 4(2).145-176.

LaBoucane-Benson, P. & Cardinal, H. (2004). Ethical Issues in Bridging Research Traditions. Pimatisiwin: A Journal of Indigenous and Aboriginal Community Health, 2(1). v – x.

LaBoucane-Benson, P. (2002). Getting out and staying out: A conceptual framework for the successful reintegration of male Aboriginal young offender. Forum on Corrections Research, 14 (3). 58-60.

LaBoucane-Benson, P. (2002). The In Search of Your Warrior Program. Forum on Corrections Research, 14 (3) 40-41.

== Personal life ==
LaBoucane-Benson is a gardener, and her husband is a traditional Cree hunter. They live in Alberta, on an acreage with their two Belgian Malinois dogs, Dante and Ryder.

Her grandmother, Grace LaBoucane, worked closely with John Diefenbaker on his campaign for prime minister, and was once offered a Senate seat, which she declined due to commitments at home in Alberta. LaBoucane-Benson cites her grandmother as a person who inspired her to pursue a seat in the Senate.
