= Nancy Hartling =

Canadian politician (born 1950)

The Honourable Nancy Hartling ONB
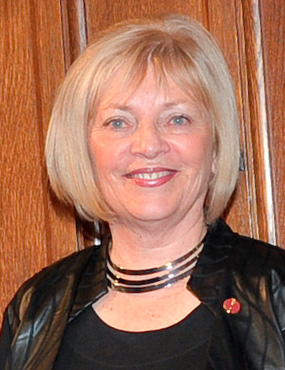

Canadian Senator from New Brunswick
- In office November 10, 2016 – February 1, 2025
- Nominated by: Justin Trudeau
- Appointed by: David Johnston

Personal details
- Born: February 1, 1950 (age 76) Tatamagouche, Nova Scotia, Canada
- Party: Independent Senators Group
- Education: St. Francis Xavier University
- Occupation: Executive director

Nancy J. Hartling ONB (born February 1, 1950) is a Canadian Senator from Moncton, New Brunswick. She was Executive Director of Support to Single Parents Inc., as well as a founding member of St. James Court Inc., a non-profit housing complex which provides single parents with affordable housing. On October 27, 2016, Hartling was named to the Senate of Canada by Prime Minister Justin Trudeau to sit as an independent and assumed office on November 10, 2016. She retired on February 1, 2025 upon reaching the mandatory retirement age of 75.

== Early life and education ==
Hartling was born in Tatamagouche, Nova Scotia, to a Royal Canadian Navy family. She moved frequently with her family across Eastern Canada, attending school in Ottawa. Hartling settled in Moncton, New Brunswick. She obtained a bachelor's degree from Norwich University, and a master's degree in adult education from St. Francis Xavier University.

== Career ==
Hartling founded Support to Single Parents Inc. in 1982, and remained the director until its dissolution in 2016. She spent most of her career advocating for women's issues and was a lecturer on family violence issues at the University of New Brunswick. She also helped to create St. James Court Inc., an apartment complex for single parents. St. James Court received funding in part from the Canada Mortgage and Housing Corporation, and operates as a nonprofit organization. She co-chaired a New Brunswick working group on violence against women convened by the provincial government.

== Senate of Canada ==
Hartling was appointed to the Senate of Canada upon retirement in 2016, after applying through the Independent Advisory Board for Senate Appointments. She retired on February 1, 2025 upon reaching the mandatory retirement age of 75.

== Awards ==
- Order of New Brunswick inducted in 2016.
- Governor General's Award, 2011.
