= Paediatrics & Child Health =

- Discipline: Paediatrics
- Language: English, French
- Edited by: Joan L Robinson, MD

Publication details
- History: 1996-present
- Publisher: Oxford University Press on behalf of the Canadian Paediatric Society (Canada)
- Frequency: 10/year
- Impact factor: 2.000 (2024)

Standard abbreviations
- ISO 4: Paediatr. Child Health

Indexing
- ISSN: 1205-7088 (print); 1918-1485 (web)
- OCLC no.: 36289733

Links
- Journal page at society website; Journal home page

Paediatrics & Child Health is a peer-reviewed medical journal of paediatrics and is the official journal of the Canadian Paediatric Society. It covers original research, practice guidelines, and continuing medical education. The journal was originally published by the Pulsus Group, but was transferred to Oxford University Press in 2016. It was established in 1996.

A different journal with a nearly identical title, Paediatrics and Child Health, is published in the United Kingdom. Both are distinct from the Journal of Paediatrics and Child Health.

In March 2026, the journal issued corrections for 138 previously published case studies because they contained fabricated data after a New Yorker article contained a confession from a researcher.
