= Paul Massicotte =

Canadian politician

The Honourable Paul J. Massicotte

Canadian Senator from Quebec (De Lanaudière)
- In office June 26, 2003 – September 9, 2025
- Nominated by: Jean Chrétien
- Appointed by: Adrienne Clarkson

Personal details
- Born: September 10, 1951 (age 74) Manitoba, Canada
- Party: Independent Senators Group (2017-2025)
- Other political affiliations: Independent Liberal (2014-2017); Liberal (until 2014)

Paul J. Massicotte (born September 10, 1951) is a former Canadian Senator representing the Senate division of De Lanaudière, Québec. He was appointed to the Senate on June 26, 2003 on the advice of Prime Minister Jean Chrétien. On October 30, 2017, he joined the Independent Senators Group caucus. He had previously sat with the Senate Liberal Caucus. Massicotte sits on the Senate Standing Committee on Banking, Trade and Commerce and the Standing Committee on Energy, the Environment and Natural Resources. Massicotte resigned from the Senate effective September 9, 2025, a year before reaching the mandatory retirement age of 75.

== Life and career ==
Massicotte obtained his Bachelor of Commerce (Dean’s Honour List) in 1974 from the University of Manitoba. In 1976, he received the designation of Chartered Accountant with the Manitoba Institute of Chartered Accountants while at the firm Coopers & Lybrand. The following year, he became a member of the Ordre des comptables agréés du Québec. In February 2005, Massicotte was granted the title of Fellow from the Ordre des comptables agréés du Québec, the profession’s highest honorific designation in recognition of his career accomplishments.

From 1977 onwards, Massicotte was successively appointed to senior executive positions with real estate development firms in Western Canada, before moving to Montreal in 1985 to join the Alexis Nihon Group. The Alexis Nihon Group was converted into Alexis Nihon REIT in December 2002. Massicotte was President of Alexis Nihon from 1985 to 2006. Massicotte was the proprietor of Attractions Hippiques, the operator of Québec's horse tracks, from 2006 to 2009.

Massicotte sits on the board of directors of the Ste-Anne’s Hospital Foundation, and the Greater Montreal YMCA Foundation. He is also active with several other social and charitable institutions.

In the past, Massicotte served as a member of the board of directors of the Bank of Canada and a member of the Advisory Committee of Mercantile Bancorp Limited. He is also a past member of the board of directors of the Canadian Chamber of Commerce, the Real Property Association of Canada, the Canadian Home Income Plan, the board of trade of Metropolitan Montreal Foundation and the board of trade of Metropolitan Montreal. He is a past chairman of the Québec Chapter of the Young Presidents' Organization and a past member of its Canadian Board. Massicotte was a member of the regional council of the Société du Quartier International de Montréal (QIM) and sat on the board of the Study Committee on Fiscal Equity at the Municipal Level in the Montreal area.

Massicotte is the founding director, past chairman and past president of the Urban Development Institute of Quebec (UDI). He was also a board member of UDI Canada. Massicotte sat on the board of La Solidarité, an insurance company. In 1997-98, he volunteered as a mentor to the Quebec prize-winner of the Business Development Bank of Canada Award. He also acted as honorary co-chair of the 2002-2003 Fundraising Campaign for the George Stephen House Trust Fund and honorary patron of the 2002-2003 and 2003-2004 Financial Campaigns of Le Chaînon.
