= John D. Wallace =

Canadian politician (born 1949)

The Honourable John D. Wallace

Senator for New Brunswick
- In office 2 January 2009 – 1 February 2017
- Nominated by: Stephen Harper
- Appointed by: Michaëlle Jean

Personal details
- Born: 26 March 1949 (age 77) Toronto, Ontario, Canada
- Party: Independent Senators Group
- Other political affiliations: Conservative (until 2015)
- Profession: corporate lawyer

John D. Wallace (born 26 March 1949) is a lawyer and retired Canadian Senator.

== Early life and career ==
Wallace was born in Toronto, Ontario and raised and educated in New Brunswick.

He received his Bachelor of Business Administration (1971) and Bachelor of Laws (1973) degrees from the University of New Brunswick.

Wallace practiced law in Saint John, New Brunswick where he was a partner in the law firms of Palmer, O'Connell, Leger, Turnbull and Turnbull and Stewart McKelvey before leaving private practice to serve as Corporate Counsel for Irving Oil Limited for 17 years.

== Senate ==
On 22 December 2008, it was announced that he would be appointed on the advice of Stephen Harper to the Senate. He assumed office on 2 January 2009.

In 2014, The Hill Times reported that Wallace was part of a bipartisan group of Liberal and Conservative Senators that secretly met to discuss how to reform the Senate from within.

On 18 November 2015, Wallace announced that he was leaving the Conservative caucus because of irreconcilable differences between himself and party leadership over the role of partisanship in the Senate, citing the 2014 Supreme Court Reference that declared that the Fathers of Confederation wanted the Senate to be "thoroughly independent."

Wallace announced on 13 December 2016, that he was retiring from the Senate effective 1 February 2017, just over seven years prior to reaching the mandatory retirement age of 75, as he promised when he was appointed that he would only serve eight years in the Upper House. None of the other 17 senators appointed with Wallace in January 2009 who made the same pledge, have announced plans to step down.
