= 42nd Canadian Parliament =

2015–2019 legislative term

- Majority parliament
- Dec. 3, 2015 – Sep. 11, 2019
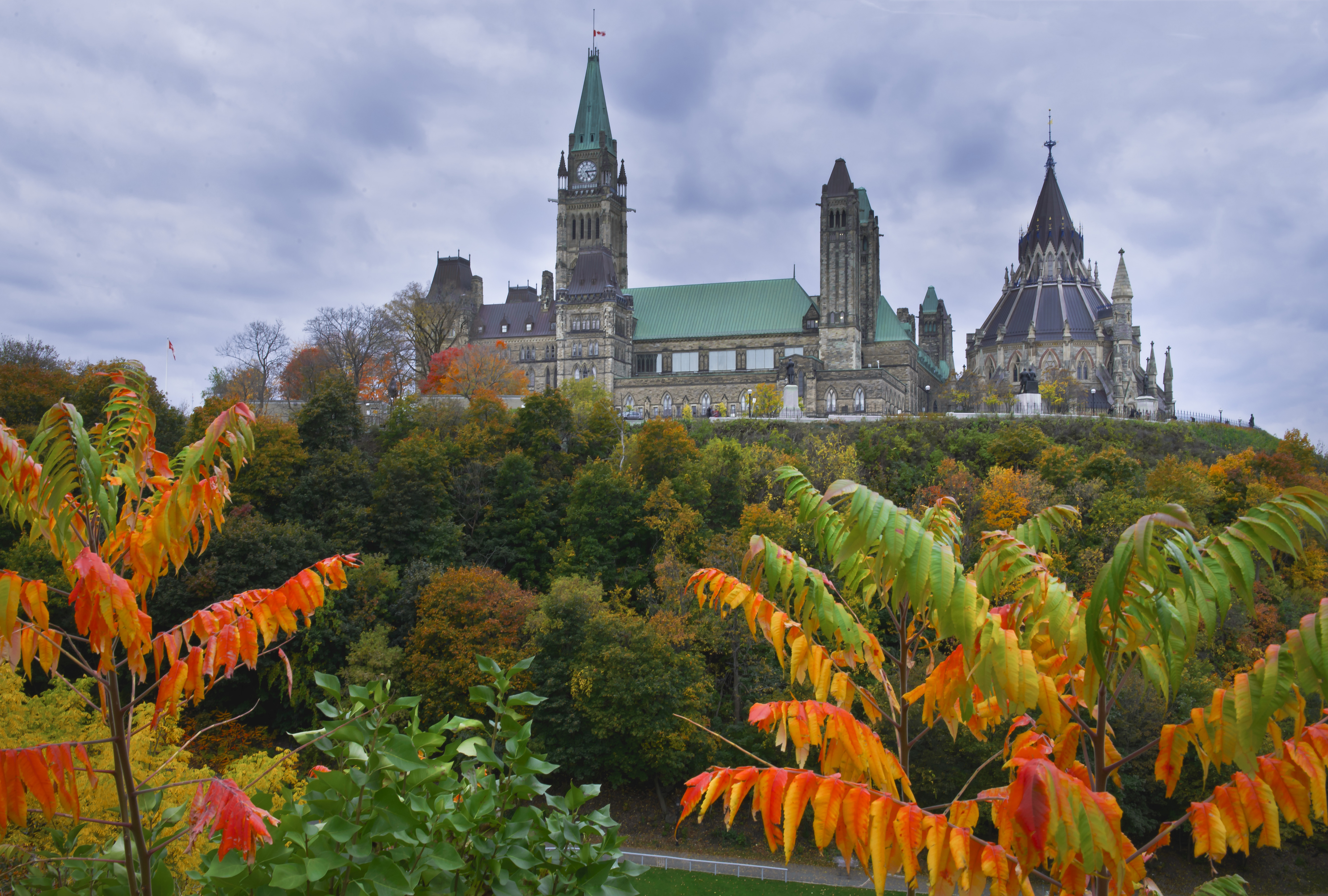
- Canadian Parliament (2017)

Parliament leaders
- Prime minister: Rt. Hon. Justin Trudeau; Nov. 4, 2015 – Mar. 14, 2025
- Cabinet: 29th Canadian Ministry
- Leader of the Opposition: Hon. Rona Ambrose; 5 November 2015 – 27 May 2017
- Hon. Andrew Scheer; 27 May 2017 – 24 August 2020

Party caucuses
- Government: Liberal Party
- Opposition: Conservative Party
- Recognized: New Democratic Party
- Independent Senators Group*
- Senate Liberal Caucus*
- Unrecognized: Québec debout (June – Sept. 2018)
- Bloc Québécois
- Green Party
- Co-operative Commonwealth
- People's Party
- * Only in the Senate.

House of Commons
- Seating arrangements of the House of Commons
- Speaker of the Commons: Hon. Geoff Regan; 3 December 2015 – 5 December 2019
- Government House leader: Hon. Dominic LeBlanc; 4 November 2015 – 19 August 2016
- Hon. Bardish Chagger; 19 August 2016 – 20 November 2019
- Opposition House leader: Hon. Andrew Scheer; 18 November 2015 – 15 September 2016
- Hon. Candice Bergen; 15 September 2016 – 24 August 2020
- Members: 338 MP seats List of members

Senate
- Seating arrangements of the Senate
- Speaker of the Senate: Hon. George Furey; 3 December 2015 – 12 May 2023
- Government Senate rep.: Hon. Peter Harder; 18 March 2016 – 31 December 2019
- Opposition Senate leader: Hon. Claude Carignan; 4 November 2015 – 31 March 2017
- Hon. Larry Smith; 1 April 2017 – 5 November 2019
- Senators: 105 senator seats List of senators

Sovereign
- Monarch: HM Elizabeth II; 6 February 1952 – 8 September 2022
- Governor general: HE Rt. Hon. David Johnston; 1 October 2010 – 2 October 2017
- HE Rt. Hon. Julie Payette; 2 October 2017 – 22 January 2021

Sessions
- 1st session 3 December 2015 – 11 September 2019
← 41st	→ 43rd

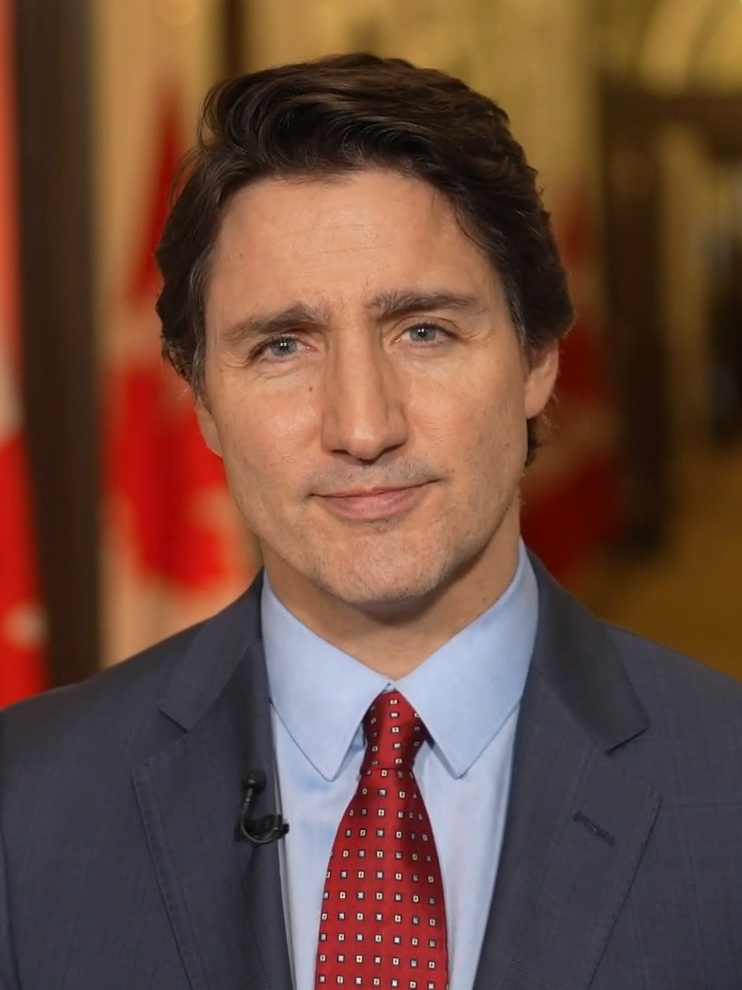
Justin Trudeau was Prime Minister during the 42nd Canadian Parliament.

The 42nd Canadian Parliament was in session from December 3, 2015, to September 11, 2019, with the membership of its lower chamber, the House of Commons of Canada, having been determined by the results of the 2015 federal election held on October 19, 2015, and thirty new appointees to its Upper House, the Senate of Canada. It was dissolved prior to the 2019 Federal Election.

There was one session of the 42nd Parliament:

Session	Start	End
1st	December 3, 2015	September 11, 2019

== Overview ==
Parliament officially resumed on December 3, 2015, with the election of a new Speaker, Geoff Regan, followed by a Speech from the Throne the following day. The Speaker of the Senate of Canada was George Furey, who was appointed Speaker of the Canadian Senate on the advice of Prime Minister Justin Trudeau, to replace Leo Housakos, on December 3, 2015. On September 11, 2019, Prime Minister Justin Trudeau advised Governor General Julie Payette to dissolve Parliament and issue the writ of election, leading to a five-week election campaign period for the 2019 federal election.

== Party standings ==
Affiliation	House members		Senate members	
Affiliation	2015 election results	At dissolution	On election day 2015	At dissolution
Liberal	184	177	–	–
Conservative	99	95	47	29
New Democratic	44	39	–	–
Bloc Québécois	10	10	–	–
Green	1	3 (Note: Includes Pierre Nantel, who is planning to run as Green Party candidate in the upcoming 2019 federal election; while serving as an independent for the remainder of the current parliament.)	–	–
Co-operative Commonwealth	–	1 (Note: The CCF was not re-established but was rather a designation used by ex-NDP MP Erin Weir)	–	–
People's	–	1	–	–
Senate Liberal Caucus	–	–	29	9
Independent	–	8	6 (Note: Includes Elaine McCoy, who was designated as Independent Progressive Conservative.)	7
Indep. Senators	–	–	–	58
Total members	338	333	83	103
Vacant	–	5	22	2
Total seats	338		105	

== Major events ==
Significant legislation adopted during the 42nd Parliament included the Cannabis Act, the Greenhouse Gas Pollution Pricing Act, the Comprehensive Economic and Trade Agreement Implementation Act, the Trans-Pacific Partnership Implementation Act, the Canada Infrastructure Bank Act, the Impact Assessment Act and Canadian Energy Regulator Acts, as well as the legalizing of medical assistance in dying and adding gender identity and expression to the list of prohibited grounds of discrimination in the Canadian Human Rights Act.

== Legislation and motions ==
Among the more significant pieces of legislation adopted in the 42nd Parliament was Bill C-14, passed with a free vote, as the government's response to Carter v Canada; it inserted the term "medical assistance in dying" into the Criminal Code and made provisions for adult Canadians to engage in the practice. Bill C-16 added "gender identity or expression" to the list of prohibited grounds of discrimination in the Canadian Human Rights Act and the list of characteristics of identifiable groups protected from hate propaganda in the Criminal Code – with only 40 Conservative Party members, who were all granted a free vote, opposed the bill. With all party support, the Accessible Canada Act (Bill C-81) created the Canadian Accessibility Standards Development Organization and the positions of Accessibility Commissioner as a member of the Human Rights Commission and Chief Accessibility Officer as an adviser to the minister responsible for accessibility. The Cannabis Act (Bill C-45) created a legal framework that allows for recreational use of cannabis by adults. Bill C-69 repealed and replaced the Canadian Environmental Assessment Act and the National Energy Board Act with the Impact Assessment Act and the Canadian Energy Regulator Act, respectively, and renamed the Navigation Protection Act to the Canadian Navigable Waters Act with new considerations for what constitutes 'navigable water'. With only the Conservative Party opposed, Bill C-55 amended the Oceans Act to require the use of the precautionary principle in establishing a marine protected areas and added the maintenance of ecological integrity as a reason for their establishment. In November 2018 Bill C-89 ended a strike action by employees of Canada Post.

In modernizing existing legislation, the Transportation Modernization Act (Bill C-49) amended the Canada Transportation Act to, among other things, implement long-haul interswitching as a permanent mechanism in the rail industry, exclude revenue from interswitching and from the movement of grain in containers on flatcars from Canadian National Railway and Canadian Pacific Railway's maximum revenue entitlement; require railway companies to keep up-to-date plans for each of their railway lines and to publicly report on their abilities to move a given summer's grain crop along with a winter contingency plans, raise the foreign ownership limits for Canadian airlines from 25% to 49% of an airline's voting interest with the new rule that no single foreign investor may own more than 25%, expand the review of joint ventures in the airline industry to also include the public interest and fair competition practices; the bill also amended several other transportation-related acts including the CN Commercialization Act to increase the individual ownership limit in Canadian National Railway from 15% to 25%, and the Railway Safety Act to require the installation of locomotive voice and video recorders onto trains. Bill C-23 repealed the Preclearance Act, 1999 and replaced it with the Preclearance Act, 2016 Bill C-59 modernized national security matters by adopting four new acts titled the National Security and Intelligence Review Agency Act, the Avoiding Complicity in Mistreatment by Foreign Entities Act and the Intelligence Commissioner Act and Communications Security Establishment Act, in addition to making amendments to the Canadian Security Intelligence Service Act, Security of Canada Information Sharing Act and Secure Air Travel Act. Bill C-25 variously amended the Canada Business Corporations Act, Canada Cooperatives Act, and Canada Not‑for‑profit Corporations Act to, among other things, allow more online tools to be used to disseminate required information to shareholders in notice and access systems, to require certain types of corporations to disclose to shareholders the composition of their boards and senior management, as well as their diversity policies or the statement that they do not have a diversity policy. The bill also prohibited businesses from issuing bearer forms of share certificates and share warrants and modified how directors of certain corporations and cooperatives are elected: that they must be elected individually, not as a slate or a group of candidates, and reduce maximum term lengths from 3 to 1 years. Bill C-57 updated how Canada's Sustainable Development Strategy is implemented. Bill C-78 updated the Divorce Act and two other related acts, as well as brought them in line with international standards of the Child Protection Convention and Child Support Convention.

On public safety and crime, Bill C-46 inserted new provisions into the Criminal Code regarding drug–impaired driving and the ability of peace officers to use drug screening equipment and random breath testing. On animal cruelty, Bill C-84 expanded the Criminal Code's provisions against cockpits to include any "arena for animal fighting" and in response to the Supreme Court of Canada findings in R. v. D.L.W., added a definition for bestiality. Bill C-75, generally seeking to address court delays and promote fair and efficient trails but also included multiple other amendments, removed the allowance of peremptory challenge, allowed warrants to be acted upon anywhere in Canada rather than only in its originating province, added new provisions for videoconference by judges and court participants, restricted the use of preliminary inquiries to only cases involving offences punishable by life imprisonment, reclassified an additional 115 offenses as hybrid offenses so that they may be prosecuted either as summary convictions or as indictable offences, increased the maximum penalty for summary convictions to two years imprisonment, and deleted or amended offenses from the Criminal Code that the Supreme Court found to be unconstitutional (abortion in R v Morgentaler, vagrancy in R v Heywood, spreading false news in R v Zundel, anal intercourse in R v CM, and those offenses in R v Martineau). Bill C-51 repealed or modified provisions within the Criminal Code found to be unconstitutional or obsolete, including those against dueling, blasphemous libel, witchcraft, crime comics and trading stamps and, in response to R v JA, clarified that an unconscious person is unable to grant consent to sexual activity. The Expungement of Historically Unjust Convictions Act (Bill C-66) allows the Parole Board of Canada to expunge historical convictions related to gross indecency, buggery or anal intercourse. Bill C-93 created a process in the Criminal Records Act to allow individuals convicted of possession of cannabis before its legalization to request a record suspension. Partially in response to recent court decisions on solitary confinement and the recommendations of the Ashley Smith inquest, Bill C-83 replaced the system of administrative and disciplinary segregation in federal prisons with "structured intervention units". Bill C-71 amended the Firearms Act to delete the 5-year limitation on background checks, mandate that sellers verify a licence before selling a non‑restricted firearm, require sellers to maintain records of sales, require that automatic authorization to transport documents specify destinations and repeals the Governor in Council's ability to reclassify specific firearms between restricted and non-restricted. Bill C-71 also undid the provisions in the Economic Action Plan 2015 Act, No. 1 exempting the Ending the Long‑gun Registry Act from the Privacy Act, Access to Information Act and the Library and Archives of Canada Act; and allows Quebec access to the Canadian Firearms Registry Data as requested in Quebec (AG) v Canada (AG).

Responding to other legislation adopted during the previous parliament, Bill C-37, removed some of the obstacles to supervised injection sites that the previous parliament's Respect for Communities Act had put in place and replaced the previous government's National Anti-Drug Strategy with the new Canadian Drugs and Substances Strategy, mostly centered on the opioid epidemic. Bill C-6 amended or repealed parts of the previous parliament's Strengthening Canadian Citizenship Act including the ability to revoke citizenship based on national security, the requirement that applicants for citizenship aged 14 to 18 and 55 to 64 to prove adequate knowledge Canada and of an official language, the residency requirement increase from three years to four years, the disallowance of time spent as temporary resident as contributing to the residency requirement, and the condition of citizenship that the applicant must intend to reside in Canada. Bill C-6 kept, but modified or expanded, Strengthening Canadian Citizenship Act's prohibition that time spent imprisoned does not contribute to the residency requirement, that an imprisoned applicant may not be granted citizenship, and that citizenship applicants must file tax returns during their residency requirement. In addition to adding a purpose statement to the Fisheries Act, Bill C-68 restored the provision against the harmful alteration, disruption or destruction of fish habitat that the Jobs, Growth and Long-term Prosperity Act had deleted. Bill C-4 repealed two private member bills adopted in the last parliament concerning union voting and financial reporting. Preparing for the 2016 Census, and in response to the previous government's involvement in the 2011 Census, Bill C-36 amended the Statistics Act to provide more independence to the Chief Statistician, remove imprisonment as a penalty for not responding to a census, and replacing the National Statistics Council with the Canadian Statistics Advisory Council. Bills C-17 and C-88 amended the previous parliament's Yukon and Nunavut Regulatory Improvement Act and the Northwest Territories Oil and Gas Operations Act, respectively, to address certain objections to the previous legislation. Bill C-62 restored or addressed changes made by the previous parliament to the Federal Public Sector Labour Relations Act regarding the determination of essential services, the ability to select between arbitration and conciliation to resolve collective bargaining disputes, and matters related to sick and disability leave.

Following through with international agreements, Bill C-11 implemented the Marrakesh VIP Treaty, Bill C-13 implemented the Bali Package, Bill C-64 implemented the Wreck Removal Convention, Bill C-82 implemented the BEPS multilateral instrument, and Bill C-31 implemented the Canada–Ukraine Free Trade Agreement, all with unanimous consent, while the Comprehensive Economic and Trade Agreement (Bill C-30) and the Trans-Pacific Partnership (Bill C-79) were implemented with only Liberals and Conservatives in support. Fulfilling a condition to ending Trump tariffs on steel and aluminum, Bill C-101 suspended, until 2021, the moratorium on trade safeguards. Further integrating the principles of the Declaration on the Rights of Indigenous Peoples, the Indigenous Languages Act (Bill C-91) created the Office of the Commissioner of Indigenous Languages to support the efforts of Indigenous peoples in maintaining Indigenous languages and Bill C-92 expanded the what is considered the best interests of an Indigenous child in the provision of child and family services to include the child's traditions, customs and language. With only Liberal Party support, Bill C-7 was adopted as the government's response to the Supreme Court's ruling in Mounted Police Association of Ontario v Canada (Attorney General), allowing RCMP members to have certain collective bargaining rights. Bill C-22 created the National Security and Intelligence Committee of Parliamentarians. Bill C-58 amended the Access to Information Act to insert a new purpose statement, insert in requirements to make requests, allow bad faith or vexatious requests to be refused, and require proactive publication of certain information (e.g. travel expenses, hospitality expenses, etc.) Bill C-10 amended the Air Canada Public Participation Act to expand where Air Canada's maintenance centres may be located to the general provinces of Manitoba, Ontario and Quebec, rather than the specific cities of Winnipeg, Mississauga and Montreal. With only the Conservative Party and Bloc Québécois opposed, Bill C-50 created new reporting requirements for political fundraising events attended by a party leader or a minister and expanded the reporting of leadership campaign expenses.

=== Financial measures ===
Regarding financial measures, Bill C-2 amended the Income Tax Act to lower federal tax paid on income between $45,283 and $90,563 from 22% to 20.5% and introduce a new top tax bracket that applies a rate of 33% to a person's income in excess of $200,000. The bill also re-instated the $5,500 annual limit to Tax-Free Savings Account contributions which the previous parliament had raised to $10,000. Bill C-26 amended the Canada Pension Plan to create the Additional Canada Pension Plan Account and to increase the maximum level of pensionable earnings.

The legislative changes resulting from the 2016 budget were implemented in Bill C-15 and Bill C-29 and included replacing the Canada Child Tax Benefit and Universal Child Care Benefit with the Canada Child Benefit, repealing the Family Tax Cut (income splitting) Credit, Education Tax Credit, Textbook Tax Credit, Children's Arts Tax Credit, Child Fitness Tax Credit, creating the School Supplies Tax Credit, exempting insulin pens, intermittent urinary catheters and feminine hygiene products from GST/HST, allowing a charity or athletic association to hold up to 20% interest in a limited partnership business, and expanding the definition of "Canadian exploration expense" to include environmental studies and community consultations conducted as a condition of obtaining a licence or permit. The Canadian Forces disability award and death benefit were raised to $360,000; the rates for Northern Residents Deduction were increased by 33%; and employment insurance benefits were temporarily extended for high unemployment areas (e.g. the northern areas of the provinces of Ontario, Manitoba, Saskatchewan and BC, the cities of Sudbury and Whitehorse, and most of the provinces of Alberta and Newfoundland and Labrador). Bill C-15 also repealed the previous parliament's Federal Balanced Budget Act and rolled back its age eligibility for the Old Age Security pension and Guaranteed Income Supplement from 67 to 65 years old.

The legislative changes resulting from the 2017 budget were implemented in Bill C-44 and Bill C-63 Among the changes was the phasing out of the Canada Savings Bond program, making vehicle for hire companies subject to GST/HST, exempting naloxone from GST/HST, eliminating of the Public Transit Tax Credit and Investment Tax Credit for Child Care Spaces, eliminating the GST/HST rebate for non-residents using Canadian accommodations as part of a tour package, increasing the excise tax on tobacco products and tying increases of the excise tax on alcoholic products to the consumer price index, and allowing mark-to-market accounting to be used for income tax calculations in forward rate and swap agreements. Bill C-44 included, within it, the Canada Infrastructure Bank Act to invest directly or attract private investment in infrastructure projects that are anticipated to generate revenue and be in the public interest, and the Invest in Canada Act which created the new crown corporation called Invest in Canada Hub to promote foreign direct investment and created the Service Fees Act to replace the User Fees Act. Bill C-63 included, within it, the Asian Infrastructure Investment Bank Agreement Act so Canada could join the Asian Infrastructure Investment Bank, repealed the Timber Marking Act, and created the Canadian Free Trade Agreement Implementation Act to replace the Agreement on Internal Trade Implementation Act.

The legislative changes resulting from the 2018 budget were implemented in Bill C-74 and Bill C-86. Among the changes was making cannabis subject to an excise duty, requiring the excise duty on tobacco products be adjusted for inflation every year instead of every five years, reducing the small business tax rate from 10.5% to and to 9%, removing the requirement for a risk score to Canadian Armed Forces personnel and police officers serving on international missions to qualify for tax relief on income earned while deployed, amending the Veterans Well-being Act to merge four benefit programs to create the new Income Replacement Benefit and replacing the Disability Award with a new 'pain and suffering compensation', renaming the 'Working Income Tax Benefit' to the 'Canada Workers Benefit' while increasing its rate from 25% to 26%, expanding the Medical Expense Tax Credit to cover the costs of caring for a service animal benefiting those living with a severe mental impairment, extending the Mineral Exploration Tax Credit by one year, extending the accelerated capital cost allowance program for clean energy generation and energy conservation equipment to 2025, expanding who is subject to Tax-on-Split-Income rules, creates the office of the Chief Information Officer of Canada, extends the provincial equalization payments program to 2024, and inserted provisions for deferred prosecution agreements into the Criminal Code. Bill C-74 included, within it, the Greenhouse Gas Pollution Pricing Act which created national standards for carbon pricing in Canada (i.e. a fuel charge and a fee on industrial emissions) and implemented a backstop federal system in jurisdictions where carbon pricing is not implemented by the provincial or territorial government.

The legislative changes resulting from the 2019 budget were implemented in Bill C-97. Among the changes was the creation of the Canada Training Credit and the Digital News Subscription Tax Credit, a 5-year extension of the Mineral Exploration Tax Credit, financial incentives for purchasing specified clean energy equipment and zero-emissions vehicles, exempting GST/HST from applying to supplies and imports of human ova and imports of human in vitro embryos, allowing non-profit news organizations to issue charitable receipts, eliminating the requirement to complete an application to enroll into the Canada Pension Plan, allowing recipients of the Old Age Security to earn $5,000 of income without deductions, creating a First-Time Home Buyer Incentive administered by CHMC, creating a six-month interest-free period on student loans, and redirecting revenue raised from carbon pricing to the areas where it was raised. Bill C-97 also amended the Canada Business Corporations Act to add the interests retirees and pensioners to the list of factors to be considered in the best interests of corporations, and to require certain classes of corporations to disclose to their shareholders prescribed information on the diversity and remuneration of their directors and senior management and the well-being of employees and pensioners. Non-financial or business related amendments within Bill C-97 include a modernization of the Pilotage Act, increasing the number of judges on the Federal Court, making a provision which prevents people from making a refugee claim if they have already made a refugee claim in another country and inserting the Thaidene Nëné National Park Reserve into the Canada National Parks Act. Bill C-97 included within it the enactment of several other acts, including the Poverty Reduction Act, the National Housing Strategy Act, the College of Immigration and Citizenship Consultants Act, the Security Screening Services Commercialization Act, the Federal Prompt Payment for Construction Work Act.

=== Private member bills ===
Ten private member bills received royal assent, with only Bill C-210 not receiving unanimous support:

- Mauril Bélanger's An Act to amend the National Anthem Act (gender) (Bill C-210) replaces the words "in all thy sons command" to "in all of us command" in the English version of the national anthem,
- Todd Doherty's Federal Framework on Post-Traumatic Stress Disorder Act (Bill C-211) requires the Minister of Health to prepare a framework for tracking incidence rates and for establishing guidelines for diagnosing, treating and managing post-traumatic stress disorder,
- Ron McKinnon's Good Samaritan Drug Overdose Act (Bill C-224) amends the Controlled Drugs and Substances Act to provide immunity from drug possession charges when seeking help to address an overdose,
- Rob Nicholson's National Strategy for Alzheimer's Disease and Other Dementias Act (Bill C-233) requires the Minister of Health develop and implement a national strategy to address aspects of dementia in the healthcare system,
- Darren Fisher's National Strategy for Safe and Environmentally Sound Disposal of Lamps Containing Mercury Act (Bill C-238) requires the Minister of the Environment develop a national strategy for the disposal tube and compact fluorescent light bulbs,
- Marilyn Gladu's Framework on Palliative Care in Canada Act (Bill C-277) requires the Minister of Health prepare a framework for improving access and delivery of palliative care,
- Chandra Arya's An Act to amend the Criminal Code (mischief) (Bill C-305) expands the scope of the Criminal Code provisions relating to acts of mischief motivated by hate on religious property to also cover educational institutions, community centres, sports or recreational facilities and a residence for seniors,
- Sven Spengemann's Gender Equality Week Act (Bill C-309) names the fourth week in September in every year Gender Equality Week,
- Colin Fraser's An Act to amend the Holidays Act (Remembrance Day) (Bill C-311) adds the word legal to the act.
- Sukh Dhaliwal's Sikh Heritage Month Act (Bill C-376) names April of every year Sikh Heritage Month.

=== Senate bills ===
On behalf of the government, senate government bills included the Strengthening Motor Vehicle Safety for Canadians Act (Bill S-2) which amended the Motor Vehicle Safety Act to allow the Minister of Transport to order a motor vehicle company to issue a recall, rather than allow the process to be at the manufacturer's discretion; Bill S-3 which amended the Indian Act as the government's response to a Quebec Superior Court ruling finding sex-based inequities in the Indian Register to be contrary to the Charter of Rights and Freedoms; Bills S-4 and S-6 which implemented tax treaties with Israel, Taiwan and Madagascar; and Bill S-5 renamed the Tobacco Act to the Tobacco and Vaping Products Act and introduced provisions relating to vaping products, such as a prohibition to selling or marketing to minors, plain packaging requirements and restrictions on advertising. Among the other bills initiated in the senate that were adopted by the parliament, Bill S-208 made May 20 of each year National Seal Products Day, Bill S-211 made June 19 of each year National Sickle Cell Awareness Day, Bill S-218 made October of every year Latin American Heritage Month, Bill S-232 made May of every year Canadian Jewish Heritage Month, and Bill S-236 simply states Charlottetown is the birthplace of Confederation. Other Senate public bills included the Justice for Victims of Corrupt Foreign Officials Act (Sergei Magnitsky Law) which allows the Governor-in-Council to seize property situated in Canada of a foreign national believed to be involved in extrajudicial killings or violations of internationally recognized human rights, and the Journalistic Sources Protection Act (Bill S-231) which allows journalists to object to an order to reveal a source of information and have the objection weighed by a court judge in light of public interest and rights to privacy. The Genetic Non-Discrimination Act (Bill S-201) was adopted with the Conservative Party, NDP and Green Party in favour; Liberal Party members were granted a free vote though the prime-minister urged members to oppose the bill, as presented, based on concerns of inconsistency with the Constitution. The act makes it a criminal offence to require an individual to undergo a genetic test, or to disclose the results of such a test, as a condition of providing goods or services, with exceptions for health care practitioners and researchers.

=== Indigenous-focused bills during the 42nd Parliament of Canada ===
- Bill C-61: Anishinabek Nation Governance Agreement Act (to implement an agreement with the Anishinabek Nation regarding governance) (passed)
- Bill C-68: An Act to Amend the Fisheries Act (with provisions recognizing Indigenous fishing rights) (passed)
- Bill C-70: An Act to Give Effect to the Agreement on Cree Nation Governance between the Crees of Eeyou Istchee and the Government of Canada, to Amend the Cree-Naskapi (of Quebec) Act and to Make Related and Consequential Amendments to Other Acts (passed)
- Bill C-91: An Act Respecting Indigenous Languages (passed)
- Bill C-92: An Act Respecting First Nations, Inuit, and Métis Children, Youth and Families (passed)
- Bill C-262: United Nations Declaration on the Rights of Indigenous Peoples (UNDRIP) Act
- Bill C-318: An Act to Establish Indian Residential School Reconciliation and Memorial Day
- Bill C-332: An Act to Provide for Reporting on Compliance with the United Nations Declaration on the Rights of Indigenous Peoples
- Bill C-369: An Act to Amend the Bills of Exchange Act, the Interpretation Act, and the Canada Labour Code (National Day for Truth and Reconciliation)
- Bill C-374: An Act to Amend the Historic Sites and Monuments Act (Indigenous Representation) (passed)
- Bill C-386: An Act to Establish Orange Shirt Day: A Day for Truth and Reconciliation
- Bill C-391: An Act Respecting a National Strategy for the Repatriation of Indigenous Human Remains and Cultural Property
- Bill C-443: An Act to Protect, Maintain, Revitalize and Strengthen Indigenous Languages
- Bill S-3: An Act to Amend the Indian Act (Elimination of Sex-Based Discrimination)(passed)
- Bill S-212: An Act for the Advancement of the Aboriginal Languages of Canada and to Recognize and Respect Aboriginal Language Rights
- Bill S-215: An Act to Amend the Criminal Code (Sentencing for Violent Offences Against Indigenous Women)

== Parliamentarians ==
=== House of Commons ===
The distribution of members by province was as follows:

Province/Territory	# MPs (ridings)	Percentage of seats	'000s persons per MP (est. July 2015)
Alberta	34	10.0%	121.9
British Columbia	42	12.4%	113.7
Manitoba	14	4.0%	92.3
New Brunswick	10	3.0%	75.9
Newfoundland and Labrador	7	2.0%	74.0
Northwest Territories	1	0.3%	44.0
Nova Scotia	11	3.2%	85.0
Nunavut	1	0.3%	36.5
Ontario	121	35.8%	113.3
Prince Edward Island	4	1.2%	36.0
Quebec	78	23.1%	104.8
Saskatchewan	14	4.0%	80.0
Yukon	1	0.3%	37.7
Canada (total/average)	338	100%	105.6

For background on the current representation, see:

1. The representation acts in the List of Canadian constitutional documents
2. Elections Canada's history on the representation formula (including the 1985 Representation Act, but any subsequent acts such as the 1999 Constitution Act or the 2011 Fair Representation Act).
3. Canadian Parliamentary Review's proposal for fairer representation for small provinces (around the time of the 2011 representation formula revision).

=== Senate ===
At the beginning of the 42nd Parliament, the senate consisted of 83 members, 47 of which caucused with the Conservative Party and 29 with the Senate Liberal Caucus. Of those who left the Senate during the 42nd Parliament, 18 had reached the mandatory retirement age, including 10 Conservatives and the last remaining senator appointed by Pierre Trudeau, and 11 voluntarily resigned, including 7 Liberals. One senator (Tobias Enverga) died while in office. The new Prime-Minister's first appointment to the senate was, in March 2016, Peter Harder to act as the Government Representative. To move the senate towards more independence, the Prime-Minister established the Independent Advisory Board for Senate Appointments to provide merit-based recommendations. Based on their first set of recommendations, Premier Trudeau appointed 6 new senators in April, including chairman of the Truth and Reconciliation Commission Murray Sinclair, former NDP provincial minister Frances Lankin, journalist André Pratte, Paralympian Chantal Petitclerc, and academics Raymonde Gagné and Ratna Omidvar. In the meantime, between November 2015 and March 2016, four Conservative, two Liberals and the last remaining Progressive Conservative senator had changed their party standing to non-affiliated. A further three Senate Liberals and one Conservative went independent between April and July, before the Prime-Minister appointed the next set of senators in November, 17 in total, based on the recommendations of the Independent Advisory Board, and all of whom sat as "non-affiliated". These senators included Éric Forest, bankers Sabi Marwah and Lucie Moncion, police commissioner Gwen Boniface, academics or doctors Yuen Pau Woo, Wanda Thomas Bernard, Diane Griffin, Marie-Françoise Mégie, Harvey Chochinov, art historian Patricia Bovey, lawyers Marilou McPhedran, Renée Dupuis, Marc Gold, former public servants Tony Dean, Howard Wetston, Raymonde Saint-Germain, and artist René Cormier. Also during that time, the Independent Senators Group was founded, in March 2016, as a non-partisan parliamentary group and on December 2, 2016, 33 non-affiliated members joined to form inaugural membership of Independent Senators Group. Trudeau appointed two more senators, Rosa Galvez and Daniel Christmas, in December 2016 and three in all of 2017, Mary Coyle, dentist Mary Jane McCallum and writer David Adams Richards, all of whom joined the Independent Senators group. Also in 2017, the Independent Senators Group took over the majority of the senate, though they did not vote as a block, with 37 members in October, from the Conservative Party who had 36 members. Throughout 2018, a further 19 senators were appointed, all of whom caucused with the Independent Senators Group, including teacher Marty Deacon, lawyers Yvonne Boyer, Pierre Dalphond and Josée Forest-Niesing, doctor Mohamed-Iqbal Ravalia, interim RCMP Commissioner Bev Busson, journalists Paula Simons and Julie Miville-Dechêne, and former Yukon Premier Pat Duncan.

=== Demographics of members ===
In 2017, 56 members of the 42nd Canadian Parliament were reported to have been born outside of Canada. 44 were MPs and 12 were senators. It was also reported that 22 of them have Dual-citizenship from other countries.

== Committees ==
=== Standing ===
- Access to Information, Privacy and Ethics
- Agriculture and Agri-Food
- Canadian Heritage
- Citizenship and Immigration
- Environment and Sustainable Development
- Finance
- Fisheries and Oceans
- Foreign Affairs and International Development
- Government Operations and Estimates
- Health
- Human Resources, Skills and Social Development and the Status of Persons with Disabilities
- Indigenous and Northern Affairs
- Industry, Science and Technology
- International Trade
- Justice and Human Rights
- National Defence
- Natural Resources
- Official Languages
- Procedure and House Affairs
- Public Accounts
- Public Safety and National Security
- Status of Women
- Transport, Infrastructure and Communities
- Veterans Affairs
- Joint Committee on the Library of Parliament
- Joint Committee for the Scrutiny of Regulations

=== Special ===
Electoral Reform

- Chair: Francis Scarpaleggia
- Vice-chairs: Scott Reid and Nathan Cullen
- John Aldag
- Alexandre Boulerice
- Matt DeCourcey
- Gérard Deltell
- Elizabeth May
- Blake Richards
- Sherry Romanado
- Ruby Sahota
- Luc Thériault

Pay Equity

- Chair: Anita Vandenbeld
- Vice-chairs: Shannon Stubbs and Sheri Benson
- Dan Albas
- Matt DeCourcey
- Julie Dzerowicz
- Marilyn Gladu
- Eva Nassif
- Terry Sheehan
- Sonia Sidhu

Joint Committee on Physician-Assisted Dying

- Chair (elected Jan.18): Rob Oliphant
- Vice-chairs: Michael Cooper and Murray Rankin
- Harold Albrecht
- John Aldag
- René Arseneault
- Guy Caron
- Julie Dabrusin
- Gérard Deltell
- Denis Lemieux
- Brenda Shanahan

== Ministry ==
The 29th Canadian Ministry began with the 42nd Parliament and was sworn in by Gov. Gen. David Johnston on November 4, 2015. It was the first Cabinet of Canada to have an equal number of men and women. Prime Minister Trudeau appointed Bill Morneau to be Minister of Finance, Jody Wilson-Raybould as Minister of Justice and Attorney General of Canada, Jane Philpott as Minister of Health, Catherine McKenna as Minister of Environment and Climate Change, Harjit Sajjan as Minister of National Defence, and Ralph Goodale as Minister of Public Safety and Emergency Preparedness

The first change to the membership of the 29th Ministry occurred with the May 31, 2016, resignation of Hunter Tootoo as Minister of Fisheries, Oceans, and the Canadian Coast Guard so that he can sit as an independent MP; he was replaced by Dominic LeBlanc. The second change in membership came with the January 10, 2017, retirements of Foreign Affairs Minister Stéphane Dion and Immigration Minister John McCallum. The Prime Minister promoted Ahmed Hussen to replace McCallum at Immigration, and moved Chrystia Freeland from Minister of International Trade to Foreign Affairs, with François-Philippe Champagne being promoted to replace Freeland at International Trade. In that same cabinet shuffle MaryAnn Mihychuk was removed from cabinet and Karina Gould promoted to cabinet, with Patty Hajdu replacing Mihychuk as Minister of Employment, Workforce, and Labour, Maryam Monsef replacing Hajdu as Minister of Status of Women, and Gould taking over Monsef's role as Minister of Democratic Institutions.

An August 28, 2017, cabinet shuffle instigated by Judy Foote, Minister of Public Services and Procurement, resigning as an MP due to health concerns, saw Foote replaced by Minister of Sport and Persons with Disabilities Carla Qualtrough, with Kent Hehr becoming Sports minister and Seamus O'Regan being promoted to take over Hehr's role as Minister of Veterans Affairs. In that same cabinet shuffle Philpott moved to the newly created Minister of Indigenous Services with Ginette Petitpas Taylor being promoted to replace Philpott as Health minister. On January 25, 2018, Hehr resigned from cabinet following accusations of inappropriate behaviour and was replaced by Kirsty Duncan who added Hehr's role as Sports minister to her existing duties as Minister of Science.

A major cabinet shuffle on July 18, 2018, saw the promotion of five MPs to cabinet with duties within several ministries shifted around. Bill Blair had the Ministry of Border Security and Organized Crime Reduction created for him from duties split off of Ahmed Hussen's portfolio. Jonathan Wilkinson took over the Minister of Fisheries, Oceans, and the Canadian Coast Guard role from Dominic LeBlanc who became Minister of Intergovernmental Affairs, Northern Affairs and Internal Trade, with Intergovernmental Affairs coming from Trudeau's own portfolio and Northern Affairs from Carolyn Bennett's. Pablo Rodríguez took over the Ministry of Canadian Heritage from Mélanie Joly who had the role of Minister of Tourism, Official Languages and La Francophonie created for her, taking La Francophonie from Marie-Claude Bibeau and Tourism from Bardish Chagger's portfolio. While Chagger remained Leader of the Government in the House of Commons her responsibility for Small Business went to Mary Ng who became Minister of Small Business and Export Promotion. Filomena Tassi became the Minister of Seniors, split out of Jean-Yves Duclos portfolio. Jim Carr took over Minister of International Trade Diversification from François-Philippe Champagne who took over as Minister of Infrastructure and Communities from Amarjeet Sohi who took over Carr's role as Minister of Natural Resources.

A shuffle on January 14, 2019, instigated by the resignation of Scott Brison, President of the Treasury Board, saw Jane Philpott move from Minister of Indigenous Services to replace Brison, with Seamus O'Regan filling her former position and Jody Wilson-Raybould replacing him as Minister of Veterans Affairs. Both David Lametti and Bernadette Jordan were promoted to cabinet from parliamentary secretary roles; Lametti to replace Wilson-Raybould as Minister of Justice and Attorney General and Jordan to fill the new role of Minister of Rural Economic Development. Amidst the SNC-Lavalin affair Wilson-Raybould and Philpott resigned their cabinet positions and were replaced by Lawrence MacAulay and Joyce Murray, respectively, with Marie-Claude Bibeau taking over MacAulay's former role as Minister of Agriculture and Maryam Monsef adding Bibeau's International Development duties to her existing duties as Minister of Status of Women.

== Officeholders ==
The officers of Parliament as of the dissolution of the 42nd Parliament are set out below.

=== Speakers ===
- Speaker of the Senate: Hon. George Furey, Non-affiliated Senator for Newfoundland & Labrador. (Dec 3, 2015 – May 12, 2023)
- Speaker of the House of Commons: Hon. Geoff Regan, Liberal Member for Halifax West, NS. (Dec 3, 2015 – December 5, 2019)

=== Other chair occupants ===
Senate

- Speaker pro tempore of the Canadian Senate: Hon. Nicole Eaton, Conservative Senator for Ontario (Dec 9, 2015 – January 21, 2020)

House of Commons

- Deputy Speaker and Chair of Committees of the Whole: Bruce Stanton, Conservative member for Simcoe North, Ontario
- Deputy Chair of Committees of the Whole: Carol Hughes, NDP member for Algoma—Manitoulin—Kapuskasing, Ontario
- Assistant Deputy Chair of Committees of the Whole: Anthony Rota, Liberal member for Nipissing—Timiskaming, Ontario

=== Party leaders ===
- Prime Minister of Canada: Rt. Hon. Justin Trudeau (Liberal)
- Leader of Her Majesty's Loyal Opposition: (Conservative)
  - Hon. Rona Ambrose (interim, November 5, 2015 – May 27, 2017)
  - Hon. Andrew Scheer (May 27, 2017 – August 24, 2020)
- Leader of the New Democratic Party:
  - Hon. Thomas Mulcair (until October 1, 2017)
  - Jagmeet Singh (since October 1, 2017) (from outside of the House until March 17, 2019)
    - Guy Caron (Parliamentary leader between October 4, 2017, and March 17, 2019)
- Leader of the Bloc Québécois:
  - Rhéal Fortin (interim, October 22, 2015 – March 18, 2017)
  - Martine Ouellet (March 18, 2017 – June 13, 2018) (from outside of the House)
  - Mario Beaulieu (interim, June 13, 2018 – January 17, 2019)
  - Yves-François Blanchet (January 17, 2019 – present) (from outside of the House)
- Leader of the Green Party: Elizabeth May
- Leader of the People's Party: Maxime Bernier

=== Floor leaders ===
Senate

- Representative of the Government in the Senate: Hon. Peter Harder (Non-affiliated)
- Leader of the Opposition in the Senate: (Conservative)
  - Hon. Claude Carignan (until March 31, 2017)
  - Hon. Larry Smith (from April 1, 2017)
- Facilitator of the Independent Senators Group:
  - Elaine McCoy (September 27, 2016 – September 25, 2017)
  - Yuen Pau Woo (September 25, 2017 – present)
- Leader of the Senate Liberal Caucus:
  - Hon. Jim Cowan (January 29, 2014 – June 15, 2016)
  - Hon. Joseph A. Day (June 15, 2016 – present)

House of Commons

- Government House Leader:
  - Hon. Dominic LeBlanc (November 4, 2015 – August 19, 2016)
  - Hon. Bardish Chagger (August 19, 2016 – present)
- Opposition House Leader:
  - Hon. Andrew Scheer (November 18, 2015 – September 15, 2016)
  - Hon. Candice Bergen (September 15, 2016 – present)
- NDP House Leader:
  - Peter Julian (October 24, 2017 – January 24, 2018)
  - Ruth Ellen Brosseau (January 31, 2018 – present)
- Bloc Québécois House Leader:
  - Luc Thériault (October 22, 2015 – March 18, 2017)
  - Gabriel Ste-Marie (March 19, 2017 – February 26, 2018)

=== Whips ===
Senate

- Chief Government Liaison: Hon. Grant Mitchell
- Deputy Government Liaison: Hon. Nick Sibbeston
- Chief Opposition Whip: Hon. Don Plett
- Deputy Opposition Whip: Hon. David Wells
- Senate Liberal Whip:
  - Hon. Jim Munson (until September 28, 2016)
  - Hon. Percy Downe (September 28, 2016 – Present)
- Deputy Senate Liberal Whip: Hon. Libbe Hubley

House of Commons

- Chief Government Whip:
  - Hon. Andrew Leslie (November 4, 2015 – January 18, 2017)
  - Hon. Pablo Rodríguez (January 19, 2017 – Present)
- Deputy Government Whip:
  - Hon. Ginette Petitpas Taylor (November 4, 2015 – January 26, 2017)
  - Hon. Filomena Tassi (January 26, 2017 – Present)
- Chief Opposition Whip:
  - Gord Brown (November 11, 2015 – July 19, 2018)
  - Mark Strahl (July 20, 2018 – Present)
- Deputy Chief Opposition Whip:
  - Dave MacKenzie (November 11, 2015 – August 28, 2017)
  - John Brassard (August 28, 2017 – Present)
- NDP Whip: Marjolaine Boutin-Sweet
- Bloc Québécois Whip: Monique Pauzé

=== Caucus chairs ===
- Liberal Party Caucus Chair: Francis Scarpaleggia
- Conservative Party Caucus Chair: David Sweet
- New Democratic Party Caucus Chair:
  - Charlie Angus (until November 23, 2016)
  - Ruth Ellen Brosseau (November 23, 2016 – January 24, 2017)
  - Daniel Blaikie (January 24, 2017 – Present)

=== Shadow cabinets ===
- Official Opposition Shadow Cabinet of the 42nd Parliament of Canada
- New Democratic Party Shadow Cabinet of the 42nd Parliament of Canada
- Bloc Québécois Shadow Cabinet of the 42nd Parliament of Canada

== Changes to party standings ==
=== House of Commons ===
==== By-elections and Floor-crossings ====
Date	District	Name	Party before	Party after	Reason
March 23, 2016	Medicine Hat—Cardston—Warner	Jim Hillyer	Conservative	Vacant	Died of an apparent heart attack
May 31, 2016	Nunavut	Hunter Tootoo	Liberal	Independent	Left Cabinet and the Liberal caucus to undergo addiction treatment
August 16, 2016	Ottawa—Vanier	Mauril Bélanger	Liberal	Vacant	Died of amyotrophic lateral sclerosis
August 26, 2016	Calgary Heritage	Stephen Harper	Conservative	Vacant	Resigned
September 23, 2016	Calgary Midnapore	Jason Kenney	Conservative	Vacant	Resigned to enter provincial politics
October 24, 2016	Medicine Hat—Cardston—Warner	Glen Motz	Vacant	Conservative	Elected as a member of parliament in a by-election
January 31, 2017	Saint-Laurent	Stéphane Dion	Liberal	Vacant	Resigned to enter diplomatic post
January 31, 2017	Markham—Thornhill	John McCallum	Liberal	Vacant	Resigned to enter diplomatic post
April 3, 2017	Calgary Heritage	Bob Benzen	Vacant	Conservative	Elected in a by-election
April 3, 2017	Ottawa—Vanier	Mona Fortier	Vacant	Liberal	Elected in a by-election
April 3, 2017	Calgary Midnapore	Stephanie Kusie	Vacant	Conservative	Elected in a by-election
April 3, 2017	Saint-Laurent	Emmanuella Lambropoulos	Vacant	Liberal	Elected in a by-election
April 3, 2017	Markham—Thornhill	Mary Ng	Vacant	Liberal	Elected in a by-election
July 4, 2017	Sturgeon River—Parkland	Rona Ambrose	Conservative	Vacant	Resigned to join the Wilson Center as a visiting scholar
August 9, 2017	Lac-Saint-Jean	Denis Lebel	Conservative	Vacant	Resigned to accept a position in the private sector
August 31, 2017	Calgary Skyview	Darshan Kang	Liberal	Independent	Resigned from the Liberal caucus amid allegations of sexual assault
September 14, 2017	Scarborough—Agincourt	Arnold Chan	Liberal	Vacant	Died of cancer
September 29, 2017	South Surrey—White Rock	Dianne Watts	Conservative	Vacant	Resigned to seek the leadership of the British Columbia Liberal Party
September 30, 2017	Bonavista—Burin—Trinity	Judy Foote	Liberal	Vacant	Resigned due to illness in her family
October 2, 2017	Battlefords—Lloydminster	Gerry Ritz	Conservative	Vacant	Resigned
October 23, 2017	Sturgeon River—Parkland	Dane Lloyd	Vacant	Conservative	Elected in a by-election
October 23, 2017	Lac-Saint-Jean	Richard Hébert	Vacant	Liberal	Elected in a by-election
December 1, 2017	Chicoutimi—Le Fjord	Denis Lemieux	Liberal	Vacant	Resigned
December 11, 2017	Bonavista—Burin—Trinity	Churence Rogers	Vacant	Liberal	Elected as a member of parliament in a by-election
December 11, 2017	Scarborough—Agincourt	Jean Yip	Vacant	Liberal	Elected as a member of parliament in a by-election
December 11, 2017	Battlefords—Lloydminster	Rosemarie Falk	Vacant	Conservative	Elected as a member of parliament in a by-election
December 11, 2017	South Surrey—White Rock	Gordie Hogg	Vacant	Liberal	Elected as a member of parliament in a by-election
February 28, 2018	Terrebonne	Michel Boudrias	Bloc Québécois	Québec debout (Note: At the time known as the Groupe parlementaire québécois)	Resigned from the Bloc Québécois caucus citing conflict with party leader Martine Ouellet
February 28, 2018	Rivière-du-Nord	Rhéal Fortin	Bloc Québécois	Québec debout	Resigned from the Bloc Québécois caucus citing conflict with party leader Martine Ouellet
February 28, 2018	Mirabel	Simon Marcil	Bloc Québécois	Québec debout	Resigned from the Bloc Québécois caucus citing conflict with party leader Martine Ouellet
February 28, 2018	Repentigny	Monique Pauzé	Bloc Québécois	Québec debout	Resigned from the Bloc Québécois caucus citing conflict with party leader Martine Ouellet
February 28, 2018	Bécancour—Nicolet—Saurel	Louis Plamondon	Bloc Québécois	Québec debout	Resigned from the Bloc Québécois caucus citing conflict with party leader Martine Ouellet
February 28, 2018	Joliette	Gabriel Ste-Marie	Bloc Québécois	Québec debout	Resigned from the Bloc Québécois caucus citing conflict with party leader Martine Ouellet
February 28, 2018	Montcalm	Luc Thériault	Bloc Québécois	Québec debout	Resigned from the Bloc Québécois caucus citing conflict with party leader Martine Ouellet
May 2, 2018	Leeds—Grenville—Thousand Islands and Rideau Lakes	Gord Brown	Conservative	Vacant	Died of a heart attack
May 3, 2018	Regina—Lewvan	Erin Weir	New Democratic	Independent	Expelled from NDP caucus following investigation into allegations of sexual misconduct, then changed affiliation to CCF
May 11, 2018	Regina—Lewvan	Erin Weir	Independent	CCF	Expelled from NDP caucus following investigation into allegations of sexual misconduct, then changed affiliation to CCF
June 6, 2018	Terrebonne	Michel Boudrias	Québec debout	Bloc Québécois	Rejoined the Bloc Québécois caucus following the resignation of party leader Martine Ouellet
June 6, 2018	Mirabel	Simon Marcil	Québec debout	Bloc Québécois	Rejoined the Bloc Québécois caucus following the resignation of party leader Martine Ouellet
June 18, 2018	Chicoutimi—Le Fjord	Richard Martel	Vacant	Conservative	Elected as a member of parliament in a by-election
August 3, 2018	Outremont	Thomas Mulcair	New Democratic	Vacant	Resigned
August 23, 2018	Beauce	Maxime Bernier	Conservative	Independent	Resigned from the Conservative caucus, and changed affiliation to newly created People's Party
September 14, 2018	Beauce	Maxime Bernier	Independent	People's	Resigned from the Conservative caucus, and changed affiliation to newly created People's Party
September 14, 2018	Burnaby South	Kennedy Stewart	New Democratic	Vacant	Resigned to run for Mayor of Vancouver in the 2018 Vancouver municipal election
September 17, 2018	Rivière-du-Nord	Rhéal Fortin	Québec debout	Bloc Québécois	Rejoined the Bloc Québécois caucus
September 17, 2018	Repentigny	Monique Pauzé	Québec debout	Bloc Québécois	Rejoined the Bloc Québécois caucus
September 17, 2018	Bécancour—Nicolet—Saurel	Louis Plamondon	Québec debout	Bloc Québécois	Rejoined the Bloc Québécois caucus
September 17, 2018	Joliette	Gabriel Ste-Marie	Québec debout	Bloc Québécois	Rejoined the Bloc Québécois caucus
September 17, 2018	Montcalm	Luc Thériault	Québec debout	Bloc Québécois	Rejoined the Bloc Québécois caucus
September 17, 2018	Aurora—Oak Ridges—Richmond Hill	Leona Alleslev	Liberal	Conservative	Changed affiliation
September 30, 2018	York—Simcoe	Peter Van Loan	Conservative	Vacant	Resigned
November 7, 2018	Parry Sound-Muskoka	Tony Clement	Conservative	Independent	Resigned from the Conservative caucus amid sexting scandal
November 30, 2018	Brampton East	Raj Grewal	Liberal	Independent	Resigned from the Liberal caucus due to controversy around his problem gambling and alleged ethical breaches
December 3, 2018	Leeds—Grenville—Thousand Islands and Rideau Lakes	Michael Barrett	Vacant	Conservative	Elected as a member of parliament in a by-election
January 2, 2019	Nanaimo—Ladysmith	Sheila Malcolmson	New Democratic	Vacant	Resigned to enter provincial politics
January 29, 2019	Saint-Léonard—Saint-Michel	Nicola Di Iorio	Liberal	Vacant	Resigned
February 10, 2019	Kings—Hants	Scott Brison	Liberal	Vacant	Resigned
February 25, 2019	Outremont	Rachel Bendayan	Vacant	Liberal	Elected as a member of parliament in a by-election
February 25, 2019	York—Simcoe	Scot Davidson	Vacant	Conservative	Elected as a member of parliament in a by-election
February 25, 2019	Burnaby South	Jagmeet Singh	Vacant	New Democratic	Elected as a member of parliament in a by-election
March 20, 2019	Whitby	Celina Caesar-Chavannes	Liberal	Independent	Resigned from caucus
April 2, 2019	Markham—Stouffville	Jane Philpott	Liberal	Independent	Removed from the Liberal caucus
April 2, 2019	Vancouver Granville	Jody Wilson-Raybould	Liberal	Independent	Removed from the Liberal caucus
May 6, 2019	Nanaimo—Ladysmith	Paul Manly	Vacant	Green	Elected as a member of parliament in a by-election
June 20, 2019	Langley—Aldergrove	Mark Warawa	Conservative	Vacant	Died of cancer
August 2, 2019	Calgary Forest Lawn	Deepak Obhrai	Conservative	Vacant	Died of cancer
August 16, 2019	Longueuil—Saint-Hubert	Pierre Nantel	New Democratic	Independent	Expelled from NDP caucus following revelations that he had been in private talks to run for another political party in the next general election
September 1, 2019	Victoria	Murray Rankin	New Democratic	Vacant	Resigned

The party standings in the House of Commons have changed as follows:

October 19, 2015 – December 11, 2017
Number of members per party by date	2015	2016						2017										
Number of members per party by date	Oct 19	Mar 23	May 31	Aug 16	Aug 26	Sep 23	Oct 24	Jan 31	Apr 3	Jul 4	Aug 9	Aug 31	Sep 14	Sep 30	Oct 2	Oct 23	Dec 1	Dec 11
Liberal	184		183	182				180	183			182	181	180		181	180	183
Conservative	99	98			97	96	97		99	98	97			96	95	96		97
New Democratic	44																	
Bloc Québécois	10																	
Green	1																	
Independent	0		1									2						
Total members	338	337		336	335	334	335	333	338	337	336		335	333	332	334	333	337
Government majority	30	31	29	28	29	30	29	27	28	29	30	28	27	27	28	28	27	29
Vacant	0	1		2	3	4	3	5	0	1	2		3	5	6	4	5	1

February 28, 2018 – February 25, 2019
Number of members per party by date	2018														2019			
Number of members per party by date	Feb 28	May 2	May 3	May 11	Jun 6	Jun 18	Aug 3	Aug 23	Sep 14	Sep 17	Sep 30	Nov 7	Nov 30	Dec 3	Jan 2	Jan 29	Feb 10	Feb 25
Liberal	183									182			181			180	179	180
Conservative	97	96				97		96		97	96	95		96				97
New Democratic	44		43				42		41						40			41
Bloc Québécois	3				5					10								
Québec debout	7				5					—								
Green	1																	
Co-operative Commonwealth	—			1														
People's	—								1									
Independent	2			3	2				3	2			3	4				
Total members	337	336				337	336		335		334			335	334	333	332	335
Government majority	29	30				29	30		31	29	30		28	27	28	27	26	25
Vacant	1	2				1	2		3		4			3	4	5	6	3

March 20 – September 11, 2019
Number of members per party by date	2019						
Number of members per party by date	Mar 20	Apr 2	May 6	Jun 20	Aug 2	Aug 16	Sep 1
Liberal	179	177					
Conservative	97			96	95		
New Democratic	41					40	39
Bloc Québécois	10						
Green	1		2				
Co-operative Commonwealth	1						
People's	1						
Independent	5		7			8	
Total members	335		336	335	334		333
Government majority	24	22	21	22	23		
Vacant	3		2	3	4		5

=== Senate ===
==== Membership changes ====
Date	Name	Province	Affiliation before	Affiliation after	Reason
November 19, 2015	John Wallace	New Brunswick	Conservative	Non-affiliated	Resigned from Conservative caucus
December 3, 2015	Jacques Demers	Quebec	Conservative	Non-affiliated	Resigned from Conservative caucus
December 7, 2015	George Furey	Newfoundland and Labrador	Senate Liberal	Non-affiliated	Resigned from Senate Liberal caucus
February 2, 2016	Pierrette Ringuette	New Brunswick	Senate Liberal	Non-affiliated	Resigned from Senate Liberal caucus
February 10, 2016	Irving Gerstein	Ontario	Conservative	vacant	Mandatory retirement
February 17, 2016	Elaine McCoy	Alberta	Ind. Progressive Conservative	Non-affiliated	Redesignated from Independent Progressive Conservative
March 1, 2016	Maria Chaput	Manitoba	Senate Liberal	vacant	Resigned from Senate
March 7, 2016	Michel Rivard	Quebec	Conservative	Non-affiliated	Resigned from Conservative caucus
March 8, 2016	Diane Bellemare	Quebec	Conservative	Non-affiliated	Resigned from Conservative caucus
March 23, 2016	Peter Harder	Ontario	vacant	Non-affiliated	Appointed to Senate
April 1, 2016	Raymonde Gagné	Manitoba	vacant	Non-affiliated	Appointed to Senate
April 1, 2016	Frances Lankin	Ontario	vacant	Non-affiliated	Appointed to Senate
April 1, 2016	Ratna Omidvar	Ontario	vacant	Non-affiliated	Appointed to Senate
April 1, 2016	Chantal Petitclerc	Quebec	vacant	Non-affiliated	Appointed to Senate
April 1, 2016	André Pratte	Quebec	vacant	Non-affiliated	Appointed to Senate
April 2, 2016	Murray Sinclair	Manitoba	vacant	Non-affiliated	Appointed to Senate
April 6, 2016	Larry Campbell	British Columbia	Senate Liberal	Non-affiliated	Resigned from Senate Liberal caucus
April 22, 2016	Céline Hervieux-Payette	Quebec	Senate Liberal	vacant	Mandatory retirement
May 2, 2016	Grant Mitchell	Alberta	Senate Liberal	Non-affiliated	Resigned from Senate Liberal caucus
May 5, 2016	Nick Sibbeston	Northwest Territories	Senate Liberal	Non-affiliated	Resigned from Senate Liberal caucus
May 16, 2016	David Smith	Ontario	Senate Liberal	vacant	Mandatory retirement
July 14, 2016	Doug Black	Alberta	Conservative	Non-affiliated	Resigned from Conservative caucus
August 7, 2016	Michel Rivard	Quebec	Non-affiliated	vacant	Mandatory retirement
September 27, 2016	Janis Johnson	Manitoba	Conservative	vacant	Resigned from Senate
November 10, 2016	Nancy Hartling	New Brunswick	vacant	Non-affiliated	Appointed to Senate
November 10, 2016	Wanda Thomas Bernard	Nova Scotia	vacant	Non-affiliated	Appointed to Senate
November 10, 2016	Gwen Boniface	Ontario	vacant	Non-affiliated	Appointed to Senate
November 10, 2016	Tony Dean	Ontario	vacant	Non-affiliated	Appointed to Senate
November 10, 2016	Sabi Marwah	Ontario	vacant	Non-affiliated	Appointed to Senate
November 10, 2016	Lucie Moncion	Ontario	vacant	Non-affiliated	Appointed to Senate
November 10, 2016	Kim Pate	Ontario	vacant	Non-affiliated	Appointed to Senate
November 10, 2016	Howard Wetston	Ontario	vacant	Non-affiliated	Appointed to Senate
November 10, 2016	Patricia Bovey	Manitoba	vacant	Non-affiliated	Appointed to Senate
November 10, 2016	René Cormier	Manitoba	vacant	Non-affiliated	Appointed to Senate
November 10, 2016	Marilou McPhedran	Manitoba	vacant	Non-affiliated	Appointed to Senate
November 10, 2016	Renée Dupuis	Quebec	vacant	Non-affiliated	Appointed to Senate
November 10, 2016	Diane Griffin	Prince Edward Island	vacant	Non-affiliated	Appointed to Senate
November 10, 2016	Yuen Pau Woo	British Columbia	vacant	Non-affiliated	Appointed to Senate
November 21, 2016	Éric Forest	Quebec	vacant	Non-affiliated	Appointed to Senate
November 22, 2016	Pierre-Hugues Boisvenu	Quebec	Non-affiliated	Conservative	Rejoined Conservative caucus
November 25, 2016	Marc Gold	Quebec	vacant	Non-affiliated	Appointed to Senate
November 25, 2016	Marie-Françoise Mégie	Quebec	vacant	Non-affiliated	Appointed to Senate
November 25, 2016	Raymonde Saint Germain	Quebec	vacant	Non-affiliated	Appointed to Senate
December 2, 2016	33 Non-affiliated senators	Various	Non-affiliated	ISG	Formation of Independent Senators Group
December 6, 2016	Daniel Christmas	Nova Scotia	vacant	Non-affiliated	Appointed to Senate
December 6, 2016	Rosa Galvez	Quebec	vacant	Non-affiliated	Appointed to Senate
December 16, 2016	Daniel Christmas	Nova Scotia	Non-affiliated	ISG	Redesignated from non-affiliated
December 16, 2016	Rosa Galvez	Quebec	Non-affiliated	ISG	Redesignated from non-affiliated
January 6, 2017	Nancy Ruth	Ontario	Conservative	vacant	Mandatory retirement
January 14, 2017	Wilfred P. Moore	Nova Scotia	Senate Liberal	vacant	Mandatory retirement
January 22, 2017	Jim Cowan	Nova Scotia	Senate Liberal	vacant	Mandatory retirement
January 31, 2017	Josée Verner	Quebec	Conservative	Non-affiliated	Resigned from Conservative caucus
February 1, 2017	John D. Wallace	New Brunswick	Non-affiliated	vacant	Resigned from Senate
March 10, 2017	Don Meredith	Ontario	ISG	Non-affiliated	Resigned from Independent Senators Group
March 10, 2017	Anne Cools	Ontario	Non-affiliated	ISG	Redesignated from non-affiliated
March 30, 2017	Wanda Bernard	Nova Scotia	Non-affiliated	ISG	Redesignated from non-affiliated
March 31, 2017	Pana Merchant	Saskatchewan	Senate Liberal	vacant	Resigned from Senate
May 10, 2017	Don Meredith	Ontario	Non-affiliated	vacant	Resigned from Senate
May 16, 2017	Stephen Greene	Nova Scotia	Conservative	Non-affiliated	Removed from Conservative caucus
August 10, 2017	Bob Runciman	Ontario	Conservative	vacant	Mandatory retirement
August 15, 2017	Daniel Lang	Yukon	Conservative	vacant	Resigned from Senate
August 30, 2017	David Adams Richards	New Brunswick	vacant	Non-affiliated	Appointed to Senate
September 4, 2017	George Baker	Newfoundland and Labrador	Senate Liberal	vacant	Mandatory retirement
September 8, 2017	Elizabeth Hubley	Prince Edward Island	Senate Liberal	vacant	Mandatory retirement
September 28, 2017	David Adams Richards	New Brunswick	Non-affiliated	ISG	Redesignated from non-affiliated
October 17, 2017	Josée Verner	Quebec	Non-affiliated	ISG	Redesignated from non-affiliated
October 24, 2017	Stephen Greene	Nova Scotia	Non-affiliated	ISG	Redesignated from non-affiliated
October 30, 2017	Paul Massicotte	Quebec	Non-affiliated	ISG	Redesignated from non-affiliated
November 6, 2017	Kelvin Ogilvie	Nova Scotia	Conservative	vacant	Mandatory retirement
November 16, 2017	Tobias Enverga	Ontario	Conservative	vacant	Death
November 21, 2017	Nick Sibbeston	Northwest Territories	Non-affiliated	vacant	Resigned from Senate
December 4, 2017	Mary Coyle	Nova Scotia	vacant	Non-affiliated	Appointed to Senate
December 4, 2017	Mary Jane McCallum	Manitoba	vacant	Non-affiliated	Appointed to Senate
January 4, 2018	Lynn Beyak	Ontario	Conservative	Non-affiliated	Removed from Conservative caucus
February 2, 2018	Joan Fraser	Quebec	Senate Liberal	vacant	Resigned from Senate
February 2, 2018	Colin Kenny	Ontario	Senate Liberal	vacant	Resigned from Senate
February 2, 2018	Claudette Tardif	Alberta	Senate Liberal	vacant	Resigned from Senate
February 7, 2018	Mary Coyle	Nova Scotia	Non-affiliated	ISG	Redesignated from non-affiliated
February 7, 2018	Mary Jane McCallum	Manitoba	Non-affiliated	ISG	Redesignated from non-affiliated
February 15, 2018	Robert Black	Ontario	vacant	Non-affiliated	Appointed to Senate
February 15, 2018	Marty Deacon	Ontario	vacant	Non-affiliated	Appointed to Senate
February 28, 2018	Robert Black	Ontario	Non-affiliated	ISG	Redesignated from non-affiliated
February 28, 2018	Marty Deacon	Ontario	Non-affiliated	ISG	Redesignated from non-affiliated
March 15, 2018	Yvonne Boyer	Ontario	vacant	Non-affiliated	Appointed to Senate
March 16, 2018	Charlie Watt	Quebec	Senate Liberal	vacant	Resigned from Senate
March 28, 2018	Yvonne Boyer	Ontario	Non-affiliated	ISG	Redesignated from non-affiliated
April 24, 2018	David Adams Richards	New Brunswick	ISG	Non-affiliated	Redesignated from Independent Senators Group
May 11, 2018	Nancy Greene Raine	British Columbia	Conservative	vacant	Mandatory retirement
June 1, 2018	Mohamed-Iqbal Ravalia	Newfoundland and Labrador	vacant	Non-affiliated	Appointed to Senate
June 6, 2018	Pierre Dalphond	Quebec	vacant	Non-affiliated	Appointed to Senate
June 6, 2018	Donna Dasko	Ontario	vacant	Non-affiliated	Appointed to Senate
June 7, 2018	Mohamed-Iqbal Ravalia	Newfoundland and Labrador	Non-affiliated	ISG	Redesignated from non-affiliated
June 8, 2018	Pierre Dalphond	Quebec	Non-affiliated	ISG	Redesignated from non-affiliated
June 8, 2018	Donna Dasko	Ontario	Non-affiliated	ISG	Redesignated from non-affiliated
June 8, 2018	David Adams Richards	New Brunswick	Non-affiliated	ISG	Redesignated from non-affiliated
June 15, 2018	Colin Deacon	Nova Scotia	vacant	Non-affiliated	Appointed to Senate
June 20, 2018	Julie Miville-Dechêne	Quebec	vacant	Non-affiliated	Appointed to Senate
August 12, 2018	Anne Cools	Ontario	ISG	vacant	Mandatory retirement
August 21, 2018	Betty Unger	Alberta	Conservative	vacant	Mandatory retirement
September 19, 2018	Julie Miville-Dechêne	Quebec	Non-affiliated	ISG	Redesignated from non-affiliated
September 21, 2018	Colin Deacon	Nova Scotia	Non-affiliated	ISG	Redesignated from non-affiliated
September 24, 2018	Bev Busson	British Columbia	vacant	Non-affiliated	Appointed to Senate
September 24, 2018	Marty Klyne	Saskatchewan	vacant	Non-affiliated	Appointed to Senate
September 29, 2018	Art Eggleton	Ontario	Senate Liberal	vacant	Mandatory retirement
October 3, 2018	Peter Boehm	Ontario	vacant	Non-affiliated	Appointed to Senate
October 3, 2018	Patti LaBoucane-Benson	Alberta	vacant	Non-affiliated	Appointed to Senate
October 3, 2018	Paula Simons	Alberta	vacant	Non-affiliated	Appointed to Senate
October 11, 2018	Josée Forest-Niesing	Ontario	vacant	Non-affiliated	Appointed to Senate
October 11, 2018	Brian Francis	Prince Edward Island	vacant	Non-affiliated	Appointed to Senate
October 17, 2018	Bev Busson	British Columbia	Non-affiliated	ISG	Redesignated from non-affiliated
October 17, 2018	Josée Forest-Niesing	Ontario	Non-affiliated	ISG	Redesignated from non-affiliated
October 17, 2018	Brian Francis	Prince Edward Island	Non-affiliated	ISG	Redesignated from non-affiliated
October 18, 2018	Peter Boehm	Ontario	Non-affiliated	ISG	Redesignated from non-affiliated
October 18, 2018	Paula Simons	Alberta	Non-affiliated	ISG	Redesignated from non-affiliated
October 30, 2018	Patti LaBoucane-Benson	Alberta	Non-affiliated	ISG	Redesignated from non-affiliated
October 31, 2018	Marty Klyne	Saskatchewan	Non-affiliated	ISG	Redesignated from non-affiliated
December 12, 2018	Margaret Dawn Anderson	Northwest Territories	vacant	Non-affiliated	Appointed to Senate
December 12, 2018	Pat Duncan	Yukon	vacant	Non-affiliated	Appointed to Senate
December 12, 2018	Stan Kutcher	Nova Scotia	vacant	Non-affiliated	Appointed to Senate
December 12, 2018	Rosemary Moodie	Ontario	vacant	Non-affiliated	Appointed to Senate
December 19, 2018	Mobina Jaffer	British Columbia	Senate Liberal	Non-affiliated	Resigned from Senate Liberal caucus
February 21, 2019	Margaret Dawn Anderson	Northwest Territories	Non-affiliated	ISG	Redesignated from non-affiliated
February 21, 2019	Pat Duncan	Yukon	Non-affiliated	ISG	Redesignated from non-affiliated
February 21, 2019	Stan Kutcher	Nova Scotia	Non-affiliated	ISG	Redesignated from non-affiliated
February 21, 2019	Rosemary Moodie	Ontario	Non-affiliated	ISG	Redesignated from non-affiliated
April 22, 2019	Ghislain Maltais	Quebec	Conservative	vacant	Mandatory retirement
June 12, 2019	Mobina Jaffer	British Columbia	Non-affiliated	ISG	Redesignated from non-affiliated
July 23, 2019	Tony Loffreda	Quebec	vacant	Non-affiliated	Appointed to Senate
August 14, 2019	Raynell Andreychuk	Saskatchewan	Conservative	vacant	Mandatory retirement
August 25, 2019	Jacques Demers	Quebec	ISG	vacant	Mandatory retirement

The party standings in the Senate have changed during the 42nd Canadian Parliament as follows:

Number of members per group by date	2015				2016																		
Number of members per group by date	Oct 19	Nov 19	Dec 3	Dec 7	Feb 2	Feb 10	Feb 17	Mar 1	Mar 7	Mar 8	Mar 23	Apr 1	Apr 2	Apr 6	Apr 22	May 2	May 5	May 16	Jul 14	Aug 7	Sep 27	Nov 10	Nov 21
Conservative	47	46	45			44			43	42									41		40		
Senate Liberal Caucus	29			28	27			26						25	24	23	22	21					
Non-affiliated	6	7	8	9	10		11		12	13	14	19	20	21		22	23		24	23		37	38
Independent PC	1						-																
Total members	83					82		81			82	87	88		87			86		85	84	98	99
Vacant	22					23		24			23	18	17		18			19		20	21	7	6

Number of members per group by date	2016					2017																	
Number of members per group by date	Nov 22	Nov 25	Dec 2	Dec 6	Dec 16	Jan 6	Jan 14	Jan 22	Jan 31	Feb 1	Mar 30	Mar 31	May 10	May 16	Aug 10	Aug 15	Aug 30	Sep 4	Sep 8	Sep 28	Oct 17	Oct 24	Oct 30
Conservative	41					40			39					38	37	36							
Non-affiliated	37	40	7	9	7				8		7		6	7			8			7	6	5	
Senate Liberal Caucus	21						20	19				18						17	16				15
Independent Senators Group	-		33		35					34	35									36	37	38	39
Total members	99	102		104		103	102	101		100		99	98		97	96	97	96	95				
Vacant	6	3		1		2	3	4		5		6	7		8	9	8	9	10				

Number of members per group by date	2017				2018																		
Number of members per group by date	Nov 6	Nov 16	Nov 21	Dec 4	Jan 4	Feb 2	Feb 7	Feb 15	Feb 28	Mar 15	Mar 16	Mar 28	Apr 24	May 11	Jun 1	Jun 6	Jun 7	Jun 8	Jun 15	Jun 20	Aug 12	Aug 20	Sep 19
Independent Senators Group	39						41		43			44	43				44	46			45		46
Conservative	35	34			33									32								31	
Senate Liberal Caucus	15					12					11												
Non-affiliated	5		4	6	7		5	7	5	6		5	6		7	9	8	6	7	8			7
Total members	94	93	92	94		91		93		94	93			92	93	95			96	97	96	95	
Vacant	11	12	13	11		14		12		11	12			13	12	10			9	8	9	10	

Number of members per group by date	2018											2019					
Number of members per group by date	Sep 21	Sep 24	Sep 29	Oct 3	Oct 11	Oct 17	Oct 18	Oct 30	Oct 31	Dec 12	Dec 19	Feb 21	Apr 22	Jun 12	Jul 23	Aug 14	Aug 25
Independent Senators Group	47					50	52	53	54			58		59			58
Conservative	31												30			29	
Senate Liberal Caucus	11		10								9						
Non-affiliated	6	8		11	13	10	8	7	6	10	11	7		6	7		
Total members	95	97	96	99	101					105			104		105	104	103
Vacant	10	8	9	6	4					0			1		0	1	2
