= Arlene Christmas =

Arlene "Dozay" Christmas
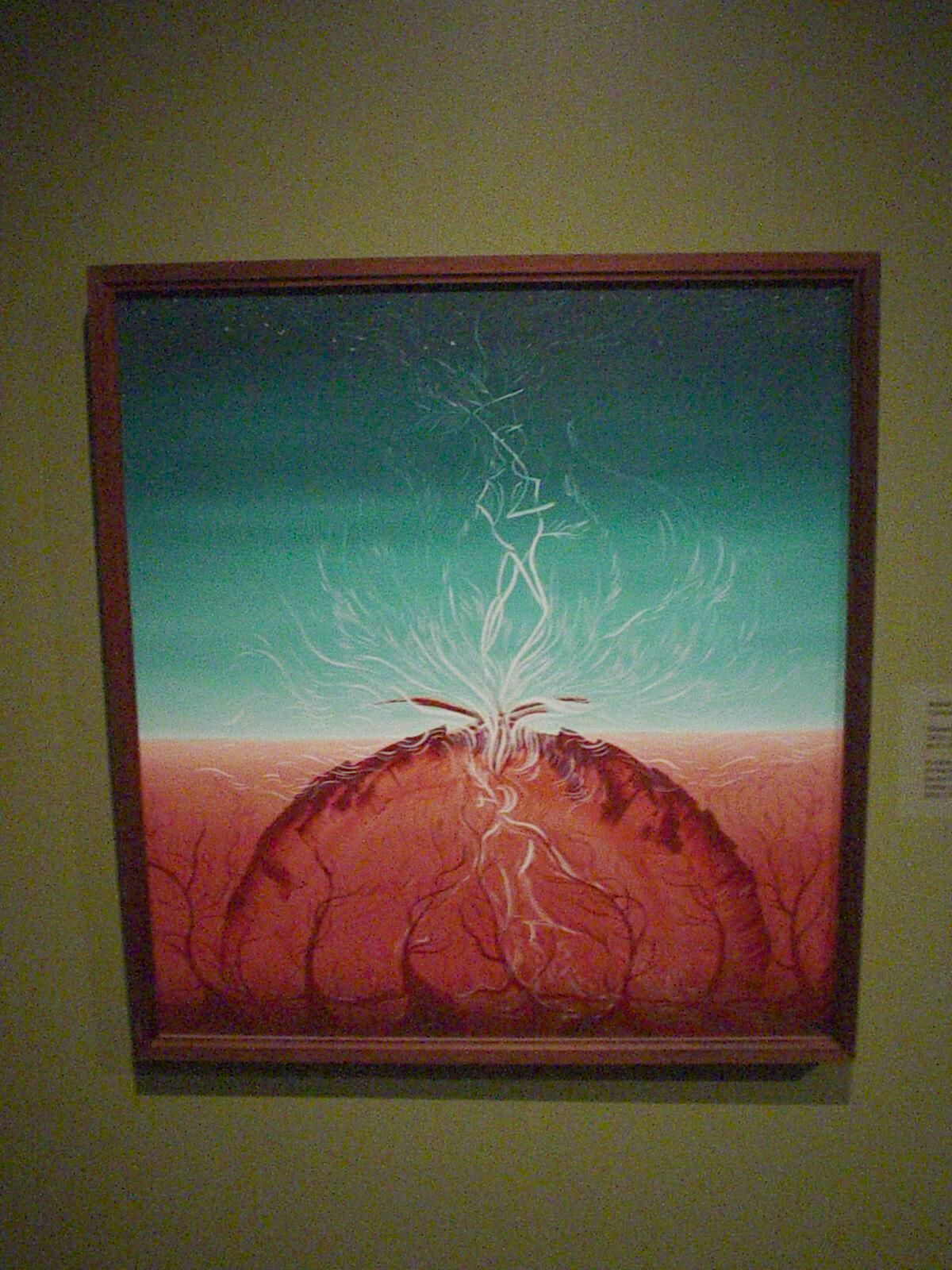
- Glooscap's Return by Christmas, Art Gallery of Nova Scotia
- Born: October 31, 1954; Tobique First Nation, New Brunswick
- Died: November 21, 2019 (aged 65)
- Spouse: Daniel Christmas
- Children: 3

Arlene “Dozay” Christmas (October 31, 1954 - November 21, 2019) was a Wolastoqiyik (Maliseet) illustrator, painter, and muralist known for her depictions of Wabanaki stories, particularly those of the cultural figure Kluskap (Glooscap). Her work combined traditional Indigenous storytelling with contemporary visual art techniques. She illustrated children's books, and her artworks exhibited in Canada and internationally.

== Early life and education ==
Christmas was born on October 31, 1954, on the Tobique First Nation in New Brunswick to parents who were basket makers, her father making the basket structure and her mother weaving. Christmas and her seven siblings were also involved in the basket-making.

She began drawing at a young age, encouraged by her mother and an uncle who gave her the name “Dozay,” meaning little daughter or little girl.

Christmas attended high school in Saint John, New Brunswick, where she worked summers at the New Brunswick Museum. There, she had access to Wolastoqiyik cultural artifacts unavailable to the public, which motivated her to bring these records and traditional knowledge to her community.

After high school, she attended the Nova Scotia College of Art and Design in Halifax, Nova Scotia.

== Career ==
Christmas had an ethereal artistic style that was inspired by Wabanaki cultural traditions, oral histories, and the natural landscapes of Atlantic Canada. Her work included oil and acrylic paintings, airbrushed works, prints, and large-scale murals.

Christmas was known for her depictions of Kluskap, a central figure in Wabanaki mythology. Over several decades, she consulted Elders and visited sites associated with the Kluskap legends in New Brunswick and Nova Scotia to become knowledgeable on the subject.

Christmas illustrated children's books focused on Indigenous stories and teachings to make traditional knowledge accessible to younger audiences. The Unama'ki Institute of Natural Resources (UINR) worked with Christmas to publish several books depicting animals and Mi'kmaw traditional ecological practices on the surrounding Bras d’Or Lakes.

In 2020, Christmas' book illustrations were used to make five animated stop motion films by First Nations youth in Cape Breton.

Later in her career, Christmas' work focused on murals, including an interior panel honouring hockey player and Mi'kmaw Hall of Famer Wallace Bernard. Outdoor panels of her work can be found at Open Hearth Park in Sydney, Nova Scotia, inside at the Wagmatcook Cultural Centre, Membertou Veteran's Centre, Mi'kmawey Debert Interpretive Trail, and at MacIntosh Brook Trail in Cape Breton Highlands National Park.

=== Style and themes ===
Airbrush techniques combined with traditional acrylics and oil paints make Christmas' work atmospheric and otherworldly. She was influenced by the poetry of Chief Dan George, local petroglyphs, Indigenous legends, Mi'kmaw poet Rita Joe, and First Nations artist Daphne Odjig.

=== Exhibits and collections ===
Christmas' work is part of the permanent collection at the Art Gallery of Nova Scotia (AGNS), including Glooscap's Return (2000) and Glooscap's Canoe - Bird Island (2000).

In 2015, Christmas's show Kluskap of the Wabanaki was exhibited at Abbe Museum, Bar Harbor, Maine The exhibit featured work portrayed several legends of Kluskap in the Wabanaki homelands, telling the stories using place-based depictions.

The Aboriginal Peoples Television Network (APTN) produced a documentary about Christmas as part of its Petroglyphs to Pixels series, which highlighted notable Canadian Indigenous artists. Christmas died before the series was aired.

Christmas's work has been exhibited in Sipuke'l Gallery in Liverpool, Nova Scotia.

== Published Works ==
- Kataq: Journey of our Eels (2012)
- The Lost Teachings / Panuijkatasikl Kina’masuti’l (2013)
- Tiam: This is our Story (2014)
- Tiam: Mi'kmaq Ecological Knowledge - Moose in Unama'ki (2014)
- Nipukt, Apistana’wj’s Forever Home (2015)
- The Oyster Garden, Kiju’ Tells Her Story
- Mn’tmu’k Mi’kmaq Ecological Knowledge: Eastern Oysters in Unama’ki

== Personal life ==
Christmas was married to Mi’kmaw Senator Daniel Christmas and they had three children.

She lived and worked in Membertou, where she maintained a home studio and gallery. Christmas died unexpectedly on November 21, 2019, at the age of 65.

On Tuesday, December 10, 2019, in the Senate Chamber in the Senate of Canada Building in Ottawa, Senator Brian Francis, read a statement about the death of Arlene "Dozay" Christmas, calling her "one of Canada’s pre-eminent Indigenous artists."
