= Tragedy of the commons (disambiguation) =

The tragedy of the commons is a concept about the overuse of common resources.

Tragedy of the commons may also refer to:

- The Tragedy of the Commons (Fargo), the first episode of season 5 of the television show Fargo
- Tragedy in the Commons, the 2014 novel by Alison Loat and Michael MacMillan
