= Marilou McPhedran =

Canadian politician (born 1951)

The Honourable Marilou McPhedran CM

Canadian Senator from Manitoba
- In office November 10, 2016 – July 22, 2026
- Nominated by: Justin Trudeau
- Appointed by: David Johnston

Personal details
- Born: July 22, 1951 (age 75) Neepawa, Manitoba, Canada
- Party: Independent
- Education: University of Toronto (BA); Osgoode Hall Law School (LLB, LLM)
- Occupation: Politician; lawyer

Marilou McPhedran CM (born July 22, 1951) is a Canadian politician, lawyer and human rights advocate. On October 27, 2016, McPhedran was named to the Senate of Canada by Prime Minister Justin Trudeau. She retired from the body on July 22, 2026.

She was the Principal (dean) of the University of Winnipeg Global College in Manitoba, Canada between 2008 and 2012.

== Biography ==
McPhedran was born and raised in rural Manitoba. She graduated with a law degree from Osgoode Hall, York University and was called to the Bar of Ontario, Canada in 1978. She was granted an honorary Doctorate of Laws from the University of Winnipeg in 1992 and completed her master's in law (LL.M.) in comparative constitutional law at Osgoode Hall in 2004.

=== Legal career ===
McPhedran's work has focused on the promotion of human rights through systemic reform in law, medicine, education and governance in Canada and internationally. She has co-founded several widely recognized non-profit systemic change organizations, including the Women's Legal Education and Action Fund (LEAF), which has conducted constitutional equality test cases and interventions for over 25 years; the Metropolitan Action Committee on Violence Against Women and Children (METRAC); the "always open" Gerstein Crisis Centre for homeless discharged psychiatric patients in Toronto; and the International Women's Rights Project, which is based on two of her intergenerational models: "evidence based advocacy" and "lived rights." McPhedran is also affiliated with the Women, Peace and Security Network.

Between 1980 and 1982, McPhedran acted as legal counsel for the Ad Hoc Committee of Canadian Women on the Constitution. In this role, McPhedran assisted the Ad Hoc Committee in securing protections for women in the Canadian Constitution, and in particular in sections 15 and 28 of the Canadian Charter of Rights and Freedoms. For her work with the Ad Hoc Committee, McPhedran was named a member of the Order of Canada in 1985. From 1994 to 1996, McPhedran was Corporate Director of Health Partnerships and International Liaison at the Women's College Hospital in Toronto, where she negotiated the College's designation as a World Health Organization Collaborating Centre in Women's Health in the Pan American region.

Between 1996 and 1997, McPhedran held the position of Strategic Counsel with the Friends of Women's College Hospital. McPhedran was the Chief Commissioner of the Saskatchewan Human Rights Commission and was the Ariel Sallows Chair in International Human Rights, University of Saskatchewan College of Law in 2007. From 1994 to 1996, McPhedran was Corporate Director of Health Partnerships and International Liaison at the Women's College Hospital in Toronto, where she negotiated the College's designation as a World Health Organization Collaborating Centre in Women's Health in the Pan American region.

McPhedran has held positions as a part-time member of the Canadian Human Rights Tribunal, and as a consultant providing legal and strategic counsel on ethical conduct and systemic change to public and private sector clients. Between 2001 and 2003 McPhedran held the position of Co-Director and Co-Investigator for the Centres of Excellence for Health's National Study of Rural, Remote and Northern Women in Canada. In 2000, McPhedran was the Executive Coordinator of the National Network on Environments and Women's Health, based at York University, which facilitated a cyber research network that linked women's health and human rights.

In 2000, McPhedran was appointed by the Minister of Health for Ontario to chair the Special Task force on Sexual Abuse of Patients by the Health Professionals in order to review the impact of the Regulated Health Professionals Act, and its related codes and policies, in the response of health professionals to situations involving sexual abuse of patients by regulated health professionals in Ontario.

McPhedran was the Chair of the Forum on Women's Activism in Constitutional Democratic Reform held in the Parliament Buildings of Canada in 2006; the Executive Coordinator of the Summit of Women Leaders of the Americas for Mental Health in Washington D.C. in 1996; and a Co-Chair of the International Multidisciplinary Teaching to Promote Women's Health Conference at the Women's College Hospital in Toronto in 1996. In 2001, McPhedran was named one of Canada's 10 most influential women's rights activists by Homemaker's Magazine.

== Political career ==
On October 27, 2016, McPhedran was named to the Senate of Canada by Prime Minister Justin Trudeau to sit as an independent. Her appointment took effect on November 10, 2016. She later joined the Independent Senators Group.

On October 18, 2021, McPhedran left the ISG caucus to sit as a non-affiliated senator. She had been facing possible expulsion from the group over insinuations Sarabjit Marwah had broken ethics rules, which turned out to be false; McPhredran left the group hours before the planned hearing.

== Selected works ==
- "Women’s Constitutional Activism in South Africa and Canada" in International Review of Constitutionalism (2009)
- "A Truer Story: Constitutional Trialogue" in Supreme Court Law Review (2007)
- "The Fight for the Charter" in Canadian Woman Studies (2007)
- "Impact of S. 15 Equality Rights on Canadian Society: beacon or laser?" in National Journal of Constitutional Law (2006)
- Engendering the "Responsibility to Protect" Doctrine (2005) a strategy paper for Canada's ambassador to the United Nations
- Preventing Sexual Abuse: A Legal Guide for Health Care Professionals (2004) with Wendy Sutton
- National Study on Rural Remote and Northern Women's Health in Canada (2003)
- "What about accountability to the patient?" in The Final Report of the Special Task Force on the Sexual Abuse of Patients (2001, ISBN 0-7778-9917-5)
- The First CEDAW Impact Study: Final Report (2000, ISBN 1-55014-397-2)
- Final Report of the Independent Task Force on Sexual Abuse of Patients, Chair (1991) – Cited in the Supreme Court of Canada decision in Norberg v. Wynrib (1992)

== Selected awards and recognition ==
- Elizabeth Fry Society of Saskatoon Rebel with a Cause Award for Community Service (2008)
- Governor General's 2003 Person's Case Medal (2003) – Highest civic award for women in Canada
- Queen's Jubilee Medal (2002)
- Named as one of Canada's ten most influential women's rights advocates by Homemaker's Magazine (2001)
- Women Who Make a Difference: Business and Professional Leadership Award, from Toronto Life Fashion Magazine (1996)
- Canadian Women Who's Who – first entry (1994)
- Merck Frosst Award for Building Healthier Communities to Healthy City Toronto (1994)
- Woman of the Year, B'nai B'rith Women (1993)
- Doctorate of Laws, honoris causa, University of Winnipeg (1992)
- Canada 125 Commemorative Medal, Government of Canada (1992)
- Canadian Who's Who – first entry (1991)
- ‘Women on the Move’ Award, Toronto Sun Publishing (1988)
- Order of Canada, Government of Canada (1985) - Canada's highest civic award
- YWCA Women of Distinction – Special Citation for Constitutional Equality Work (1981)
