= Canada workers benefit =

Refundable tax credit for low-income workers

The Canada Workers Benefit (CWB) is a refundable tax credit in Canada. Introduced in 2007 under the name Workers Income Tax Benefit (WITB), it offers tax relief to working low-income individuals and encourages others to enter the workforce. The WITB has been expanded considerably since its introduction, and restructured in depth by the 2018 Canadian federal budget when it was renamed the Canada Workers Benefit.

== History ==
=== Workers Income Tax Benefit (WITB, 2007–2018) ===
The creation of the WITB was announced in the November 2005 Economic and Fiscal Update. It was scheduled to enter into force on 1 January 2008. In its first budget, the newly elected Harper government reiterated the intention of the federal government to go forward with the implementation of the WITB. The WITB was ultimately implemented by the 2007 Canadian federal budget, a year earlier than planned initially.

=== Canada Workers Benefit (CWB, since 2018) ===
The 2018 Canadian federal budget replaced the WITB with the new Canada Workers Benefit (CWB). The CWB is an enhanced version of the former WITB as it provides increased benefits and has a higher income level at which the benefit is phased-out completely. The Canada Revenue Agency will also automatically test eligibility to the CWB when taxes are filed in order to increase accessibility to the program.

== Eligibility ==
To be eligible for the CWB, the applicant or their spouse must be a Canadian resident for income tax purposes of at least 19 years of age as of December 31, and cannot be a full-time student. The WITB can be claimed on line 453 (45300 since the 2019 tax year) of the income tax return if their income exceeds $3,000 for the calendar year. However, the additional paperwork required to claim the credit is complex, involving a 42-step process on Schedule 6 of Canada's main income-tax form.

== Benefits ==
As of 2016, the WITB is worth up to CA$1,028 for a single individual and CA$1,868 for couples and single-parent families. Benefits increase and then decrease with income. At an income of $18,529 for single individuals or $28,576 for families the benefits decrease to $0. WITB is estimated to benefit 1.4 million working Canadians annually, at a cost to the federal government of CA$1.2 billion. In October 2017, the Liberal government of Justin Trudeau promised to expand the benefit by CA$500 million annually, beginning in 2019.

Consistently since 2009, only about 85% of all working Canadians eligible for the WITB have claimed their benefit, with particularly low uptake in Atlantic Canada and the Prairie provinces. In 2017, this left an estimated CA$175 million in benefits unclaimed by 240,000 eligible low-income Canadians. This is thought by the Canada Revenue Agency (CRA) to be due to a mixture of lack of awareness and the complexity of the forms required to claim the benefit. CRA is working to increase uptake by expanding its support for free volunteer tax-preparation services and by scaling up a 2016 pilot project in New Brunswick, which highlighted the program to persons likely eligible for the program and was judged to have had a "positive impact."
