= Ratna Omidvar =

Canadian politician and academic

The Honourable Ratna Omidvar CM OOnt
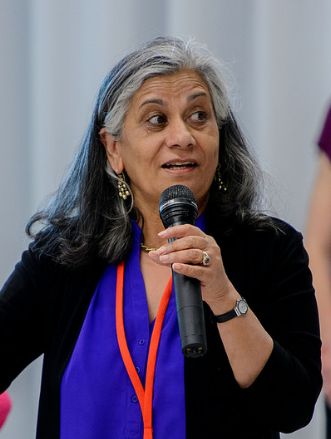

Canadian Senator from Ontario
- In office March 18, 2016 – November 5, 2024
- Nominated by: Justin Trudeau
- Appointed by: David Johnston

Personal details
- Born: November 5, 1949 (age 76) Amritsar, Punjab, India
- Party: Independent Senators Group
- Education: University of Delhi
- Occupation: Politician; executive director; academic

Ratna Omidvar CM OOnt (born November 5, 1949) is a Canadian politician and academic, who was named to the Senate of Canada to represent Ontario on March 18, 2016. She retired from the Senate on November 5, 2024 upon reaching the mandatory retirement age of 75.

== Early life and academic career ==
Originally from Amritsar, India, she was educated at the University of Delhi. Although she was born in Amritsar, the Sikh holy city, she is not a Sikh. She met her Iranian husband while studying in Germany and went to live with him in Iran in 1975. In 1981 they fled the Iranian Revolution and immigrated to Canada.

She became executive director of the Maytree Foundation, a charitable organization to combat poverty in Canada, before departing in 2014 to found the Global Diversity Exchange at the Ted Rogers School of Management, Toronto Metropolitan University where she was a distinguished visiting professor. Omidvar is the current co-chair of the Global Future Council on Migration hosted by the World Economic Forum. She is also a director at the Environics Institute, and Samara Canada. She is the Toronto Region Immigrant Employment Council’s chair emerita and was formerly the chair of Lifeline Syria.

Omidvar is co-author of Flight and Freedom: Stories of Escape to Canada (2015), an Open Book Toronto best book of 2015 and one of the Toronto Star's top five good reads from Word on the Street. She is also a contributor to The Harper Factor (2016) and co-editor of Five Good Ideas: Practical Strategies for Non-Profit Success (2011).

== Senate career ==
Omidvar was named to the Senate of Canada by Prime Minister Justin Trudeau to represent Ontario on March 18, 2016, joining the Independent Senators Group.

In 2016, Omidvar's exchange with psychologist Jordan Peterson during a Senate Committee on Legal and Constitutional Affairs hearing on Bill C-16 received significant attention, where Peterson defended his position against the bill's provisions requiring the use of pronouns for persons based on their identified gender if different from their biological sex.

In October 2018, Omidvar introduced a motion to strip Aung San Suu Kyi of her honorary Canadian citizenship over her government's actions in the Rohingya conflict. Passed unanimously, the measure stripped Suu Kyi of the honour, since the House of Commons had passed a similar measure earlier in the month.

Ratna Omidvar expressed her objections to Bill S-219 "An Act to deter Iran-sponsored terrorism, incitement to hatred, and human rights violations", and voted negatively on the bill which was eventually declined by the Senate of Canada in May 2018.

Omidvar notably interacted with Laird Hunter on October 22, 2018, in a Senate Committee dealing with charities and non-profits.

== Honours ==
Omidvar was appointed to the Order of Ontario in 2005 and became a Member of the Order of Canada in 2011, with both honours recognizing her advocacy work on behalf of immigrants and devotion to reducing inequality in Canada. She also received an honorary doctorate in laws York University in 2012. In 2014, Omidvar received the Cross of the Order of Merit of the Federal Republic of Germany in recognition of her contribution to the advancement of German-Canadian relations.

Omidvar has also been recognized by Canada's national newspaper, The Globe and Mail, by being named as its Nation Builder of the Decade for Citizenship in 2010. In 2016, CivicAction awarded her with their Lifetime Achievement Award for Civic Leadership in the Greater Toronto Area.

In 2018, Omidvar was one of the recipients of the 2018 Top 25 Canadian Immigrant Awards presented by Canadian Immigrant Magazine.
