= Mary Coyle =

Canadian politician

The Honourable Mary Coyle

Canadian Senator from Nova Scotia
- Incumbent
- Assumed office December 4, 2017
- Nominated by: Justin Trudeau
- Appointed by: Julie Payette

Personal details
- Born: November 5, 1954 (age 71)
- Party: Independent Senators Group
- Website: sencanada.ca/en/senators/coyle-mary/

Mary Coyle (born November 5, 1954) is a Canadian politician serving as a senator from Nova Scotia. Coyle was appointed to the Senate on the advice of Prime Minister Justin Trudeau on December 4, 2017, and sits as a member of the Independent Senators Group (ISG). A long time champion of women's leadership, gender equality, and the rights of Indigenous Peoples, Coyle is a leader in the post-secondary education and not-for-profit sectors, as well as in international and local development.

== Early life and education ==
One of seven children, Coyle was born in Orillia, Ontario. Her family frequently moved around the province as her father was a travelling salesman and her mother a nurse. Coyle's interest in politics began early in her youth. As head girl, she took the initiative of inviting Prime Minister Pierre Elliot Trudeau to visit her high school in Ottawa to meet and engage with students.

Coyle holds a Bachelor of Arts in Languages and Literature from the University of Guelph, a Master of Arts in Rural Planning and Development from the University of Guelph, and a diploma in French Language from the Université de Besançon.

In May 2022, Coyle received an honorary Doctorate of Business Management from the Meru University of Science and Technology in Kenya.

== Career ==
After graduating, Coyle began her early career working in the Southern District of Botswana, where she worked as Rural Industrial Officer. After returning to Canada and completing her master's degree, Coyle moved to Indonesia to work as Rural Development Advisor to the District Planning Board in South Sulawesi. Coyle later supported two State Islamic Universities develop their community engagement strategies.

Coyle then served for a decade as Executive Director for Canadian NGO, Calmeadow. At Calmeadow, Coyle played a crucial role in designing and establishing The First People’s Fund, which provides microfinance loans to First Nation and Métis communities in Canada. Coyle also helped create BancoSol in Bolivia, the world's first commercial microfinance bank.

After 10 years with Calmeadow, Coyle moved to Antigonish, Nova Scotia, in 1997 and became a Vice-President and the Director of the Coady Institute at St. Francis Xavier University, During Coyle's tenure, the Coady International Institute grew significantly, enhancing its global education and innovation agenda and expanding programming by helping establish the International Centre for Women’s Leadership and the Indigenous Women in Community Leadership Initiative.

She stepped away from The Coady after 13 years to work in Haiti and Indonesia, but would return to St. Francis Xavier in 2014 as the Executive Director of the Frank McKenna Centre for Leadership. Coyle was also instrumental in the establishment of the Stephen Lewis Foundation, the Romeo Dallaire Child Soldiers Initiative, and the Indian School of Microfinance for Women.

== Political career ==
Coyle was appointed to the Senate by Governor General Julie Payette on the advice of Prime Minister Justin Trudeau on December 4, 2017, alongside Mary Jane McCallum of Manitoba. Coyle serves on the Senate Standing Committees on Indigenous Peoples and Foreign Affairs and International Trade. Coyle is also the co-founder and co-chair of "Senators for Climate Solutions"., a group that brings together, informs, and supports Canadian senators who want to find effective solutions to climate change.

== Personal life ==
Coyle has three daughters, Emilie, Lauren and Lindelwa, and 7 grandchildren. Her third daughter was born during her time in Botswana.

In 2016, Coyle underwent treatment for stage-three breast cancer.
