= Howard Wetston =

Canadian politician

The Honourable Howard Wetston CM KC

Canadian Senator from Ontario
- In office 16 November 2016 – 3 June 2022
- Nominated by: Justin Trudeau
- Appointed by: David Johnston

Personal details
- Born: Howard I. Wetston; June 3, 1947 (age 79) Germany
- Party: Independent Senators Group
- Profession: Lawyer; Public Servant

Howard Isadore Wetston CM KC (born June 3, 1947), is a former Canadian Senator and retired public servant and lawyer who was formerly the Chairperson of the Ontario Securities Commission from 2010 to 2015. Prior to the OSC, Wetson was the chair and CEO of the Ontario Energy Board and various other public organizations.

On October 31, 2016, his appointment to the Senate of Canada was announced. Wetston was a member of the Independent Senators Group.

== Early life ==
Wetston's parents were Jewish immigrants, fleeing Nazi persecution in Poland during the Second World War. His parents then fled to Uzbek Soviet Socialist Republic and were then relocated to a displaced persons camp in Germany, where Howard was born. His family then settled in Sydney, Nova Scotia in 1949.

== Career ==
He graduated from Mount Allison University with a Bachelor of Science and later with a Bachelor of Law from Dalhousie Law School. He was called to the bar in Nova Scotia, Ontario, and Alberta and worked as a Crown Counsel in his early career.

=== Federal judge ===
Wetston was a judge of the Federal Court of Canada from 1993 to 1999, and before that was Director of Investigation and Research with the federal Competition Bureau from 1989 to 1993.

=== Chair of the Ontario Securities Commission ===
Wetston was appointed as chair of the OSC in October 2010 to a 3-year term by Ontario Finance Minister Dwight Duncan. His term was extended until 2015 when Wetston stepped down.

== Honours ==
In 2016, he was awarded the Order of Canada for his contributions as a public servant, jurist, and regulator and in 2021 he received the Queen Elizabeth II Diamond Jubilee Medal. He is also the recipient of honorary doctorate degrees from Dalhousie University and Cape Breton University.
