= Canada Cooperatives Act =

Parliament of Canada
- Long title: An Act respecting cooperatives
- Citation: S.C. 1998, c. 1
- Enacted by: Parliament of Canada
- Royal assent: 31 March 1998
- Effective: 31 December 1999

Legislative history
- Bill citation: Bill C-5
- Introduced by: John Manley MP, Minister of Industry
- First reading: 25 September 1997
- Second reading: 22 October 1997
- Third reading: 9 December 1997
- Committee report: 3rd Report of the Industry Committee
- Status: In force

The Canada Cooperatives Act (French: Loi canadienne sur les coopératives) is a law enacted by the Parliament of Canada, and addresses Canada's incorporation regime for co-operative businesses that are of a federal nature.

== Legislative history ==
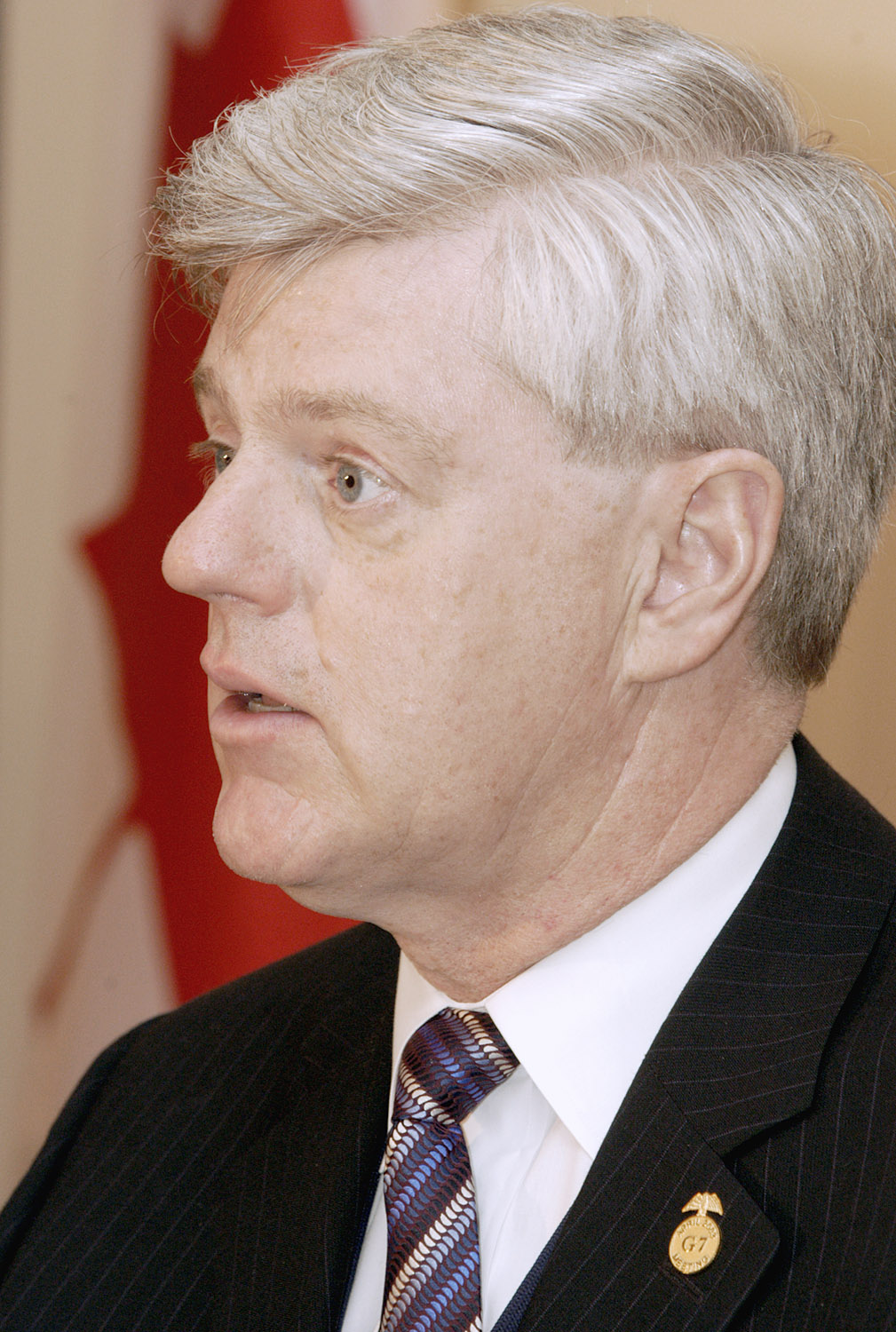
John Manley, who introduced the act as Minister of Industry

The act superseded the Co-operative Associations Act, 1970, and was introduced by John Manley as Bill C-5 in the 36th Parliament of Canada on 25 September 1997. The Bill was characterized as being a result of requests and model legislation by tertiary co-operative organizations - the Canadian Co-operative Association and Conseil canadien de la co-opération requesting modernization to permit greater capital investment, to harmonize with incoming provincial changes, to align with provisions in the Business Corporations Act, to permit mergers and to decrease bureaucracy. At the debate stage during second reading of the bill, the bill saw support except among the Bloc Quebecois, who wanted substantial amendments. It was reported back from the industry committee with amendments which were adopted. At third reading, the bill passed without a recorded vote on 9 December, and with positive statements by the Bloc Quebecois, Liberals, NDP and Progressive Conservatives.

There was some confusion raised in debate about whether the Saskatchewan and Alberta wheat pools were operating as co-operatives while being traded on an exchange, but those questions were unresolved in debate.

The bill was read for the first time in the Senate on the same day it passed the House of Commons, and passed second reading with minimal debate on 16 December and passed 3rd reading without debate after a committee report recommended no changes.

The House received notice on 31 March 1998, that the Bill received assent from Deputy Governor General and Puisne Justice Michel Bastarache.

The Act came into effect on 31 December 1999.

The Act has seen minor amendments, including as part of a general overhaul of corporate legislation under Bill C-25 in 2016.

== Statutory details and powers ==
The Act details responsibilities and powers for the designated minister.

It established the share structure and definition of a business operating under co-operative principles. The Act establishes requirements for by-laws and corporate directors, the ability to carry on business, as well as banning insider trading, mandating financial disclosures. It also establishes special rules for worker co-operatives, including minimum amounts of co-ownership, handling layoffs, and special by-law requirements.

The minister has power to create regulations under the act, and a corresponding regulation outlines multiple exercises of this power with regard to restrictions on business names, forms, and the establishment of certain fees to be paid to the government for services rendered to co-ops.
