= Mohamed-Iqbal Ravalia =

Canadian senator (born 1957)

The Honourable Mohamed-Iqbal Ravalia CM

Senator from Newfoundland and Labrador
- Incumbent
- Assumed office June 1, 2018
- Nominated by: Justin Trudeau
- Appointed by: Julie Payette

Personal details
- Born: August 15, 1957 (age 69) Rhodesia
- Party: Independent Senators Group

Mohamed-Iqbal Ravalia (born August 15, 1957) is a Canadian senator from Newfoundland and Labrador. He was appointed to the Senate on June 1, 2018.

== Early life and education ==
Ravalia left white minority rule in what was then Rhodesia and immigrated to rural Newfoundland. He holds a bachelor of medicine and bachelor of surgery from the University of Rhodesia, in present-day Zimbabwe.

== Career ==
Prior to his appointment to the Senate, Ravalia was a family physician, as well as a senior medical officer at the Notre Dame Bay Memorial Health Centre, in Twillingate, NL. He was also an associate professor of family medicine and the assistant dean of Rural Medical Education Network at Memorial University of Newfoundland.

== Personal life and recognition ==
He has been awarded the Canadian Family Physician of the Year Award and received the Order of Canada in 2016. In 2012, he was awarded the Queen's Diamond Jubilee Medal.

Ravalia and his wife Dianne have two sons, Adam and Mikhail.
