= Josée Forest-Niesing =

Canadian lawyer and politician (1964–2021)

The Honourable Josée Forest-Niesing

Canadian Senator from Ontario
- In office October 11, 2018 – November 20, 2021
- Nominated by: Justin Trudeau
- Appointed by: Julie Payette

Personal details
- Born: December 18, 1964 Ontario, Canada
- Died: November 20, 2021 (aged 56) Sudbury, Ontario, Canada
- Party: Independent Senators Group
- Spouse: Robert
- Children: 2
- Occupation: Lawyer

Josée Forest-Niesing (December 18, 1964 – November 20, 2021) was a Canadian lawyer and politician, who was appointed to the Senate of Canada in October 2018.

== Biography ==
Forest-Niesing's grandmother, Agnès Lafond, was a member of the Abénakis de Wôlinak First Nation. She first attended Collège Notre-Dame before getting under undergraduate degree in law, justice, and political science at Laurentian University. She then studied law at the University of Ottawa. She was called to the Ontario Bar in 1990. As a lawyer, she was a partner in the firm Lacroix Forest LLP where she specialized in family law, civil litigation, education law, and employment law. A trial lawyer from Sudbury, Ontario, she served on the boards of the Art Gallery of Sudbury, the Carrefour Francophone de Sudbury, the University of Sudbury and the Ontario Arts Council. Prior to her appointment as senator, she was a judge for the Superior Court of Justice Small Claims Court.

She was an advocate for the use of the French language and helped get funding for Laurentian University's French-language programs after it was about to be cut. Among other actions, she did as a senator, she helped update Senate committee mandates and indigenous rights.

Forest-Niesing was hospitalized due to COVID-19 in October 2021; she had an autoimmune condition affecting her lungs, which increased her vulnerability to the virus. She was discharged on November 14, but died a few days later on November 20, 2021, at the age of 56. Forest-Niesing had two children with her husband, Robert.
