= Samara Centre for Democracy =

The Samara Centre for Democracy
- Founded: 2007; 19 years ago
- Founder: Alison Loat, Michael MacMillan
- Purpose: Civic engagement, Citizen participation
- Location: 33 Prince Arthur Ave., Toronto, Ontario, M5R 1B2, Canada
- Region served: Canada
- Website: https://www.samaracentre.ca/

The Samara Centre for Democracy began as the Samara Project and was co-founded in 2007 by Alison Loat and Michael MacMillan. Sabreena Delhon is the CEO of the Samara Centre and joined the organization in 2021.

== Origin of name and mandate ==
The organization is named after a samara, "the winged helicopter seed that falls from the maple tree." They note that as the seed of the tree whose leaves are the symbol of Canada, the samara "is a symbol of Canada, and a reminder that from small seeds, big ideas can grow."

== Samara Democracy Reports and research ==
To date, the Samara Centre has released numerous reports, including:

- The Real Outsiders: Politically Disengaged Views on Politics and Democracy
- The Neighbourhoods of #cdnpoli
- Occupiers and Legislators: A Snapshot of Political Media Coverage
- Who's the Boss?: Canadians' Views on their Democracy
- Lost in Translation or Just Lost?: Canadians' Priorities and the House of Commons
- 50 Ways to Redesign Parliament
- The Real Outsiders
- By Invitation Only
- Don't Blame "The People": The rise of elite-led populism in Canada

They have also conducted and released annual polls around democratic engagement and the political system in Canada starting in 2012.

== Impact ==
The 2012 report, Who's the Boss?: Canadians' Views on their Democracy received wide media coverage across the country for its revelations that of growing dissatisfaction with the House of Commons and MPs. Their fifth report, Lost in Translation or Just Lost?: Canadians' Priorities and the House of Commons has been followed by a major series of pieces in The Globe and Mail newspaper called "Reinventing Parliament"

Following the release of the MP Exit Interviews reforms were made to the MP orientation to take into account some of the shortcomings identified in the report which was implemented following the 2011 Canadian federal election.

== Books ==
Tragedy in the Commons: Former Members of Parliament Speak Out about Canada's Failing Democracy (Toronto: Random House Canada, 2014), written by Samara Centre co-founders Alison Loat and Michael MacMillan, draws on eighty exit interviews with former Members of Parliament from across the political spectrum. The book discusses the realities of political life in Canada and concludes with proposals for revitalizing a democracy that the authors claim has lost much of its purpose, direction, and public trust. Upon release, it appeared on the Toronto Star Bestseller List (April 25, 2014) and the Globe and Mail Bestseller List (April 26, 2014).

Real House Lives (Toronto: Friesen Press, 2020), authored by Michael Morden and fellow researchers at the Samara Centre, continues this exploration of Canadian political life. Building on the exit interview project, the book recounts the personal stories and experiences of former parliamentarians to diagnose the challenges facing Canadian federal politics. It traces the trajectory of MPs’ careers and calls for reforms to strengthen Parliament, invigorate local democratic participation, and build healthier political parties capable of supporting effective leadership.
