= Oil and Gas Operations Act =

Canadian federal statute

Northwest Territories Oil and Gas Operations Act, 2014

Parliament of Canada
- Royal assent: March 25, 2014
- Commenced: April 1, 2014
- Status: Current legislation

The Oil and Gas Operations Act (French: Loi sur les opérations pétrolières) is a legislation that legally gives the Government of the Northwest Territories the right to govern onshore “exploration, production, processing and transportation of oil and gas resources in the Northwest Territories”.

It was introduced as Bill-15 within Bill C-15 of the Northwest Territories Devolution Act on December 3, 2013, in the House of Commons by then-Minister of Aboriginal Affairs and Northern Development Bernard Valcourt. The Act became an official law after receiving the Royal Assent on March 25, 2014, and is in effect as of April 1, 2014.

== Background ==
Prior to the devolution of the Northwest Territories (NWT), all legislation and laws governing the territory was under the authority of the Federal Government of Canada. This included oil and gas development on and off-shore which was in accordance to the Canada Oil and Gas Operations Act since 1985 to 2014 and the Canada Petroleum Resources Act, 1987. The Government of Canada had combined both Acts to be imposed on the NWT over its natural resources.

On September 6, 1988, the Government of Canada and the Government of Northwest Territories (GNWT) entered into an "Agreement in Principle” concerning the Northern accord. This AiP (Agreement-in-Principle) facilitated negotiations towards the development of oil and gas resources that aimed to benefit the NWT economically and politically by providing better industrial management and upholding Aboriginal rights and claim settlements.

These negotiations continued for years with the Northwest Territories needing financial support from the Government of Canada and with many northern indigenous people feeling that the negotiations were not in favor for greater independence to self-govern due to, the uneven representation within the government.

Discussions eventually led to movement towards devolution of the NWT with the signing of AiP (Agreement- in-principle) that showed the Federal Government of Canada, the Government of the Northwest Territories and the five regional Aboriginal governments were in favor for the devolution Act.

On March 11, 2013, the seven signatory parties of the AiP signed a Consensus Agreement that outlined the devolution power and authority of lands and resource management from Government of Canada to the Government of the Northwest Territories. The final sign-off on the agreement was on June 25, 2013, when it was introduced as a bill in the House of Commons.

== Purpose ==
The purpose of the Northwest Territories Oil and Gas Operations Act is to encourage “safety, protection of the environment, the conservation of oil and gas resources and joint production arrangements over the exploration for and exploitation of oil and gas”.

The Act states that all matters regarding onshore oil and gas development is the responsibility of a contracted external representative or the territorial regulators, who are elected by the representatives of the Government of the Northwest Territories (GNWT). As of October 21, 2011 to the GNWT17th Legislative Assembly is regulated by the department of Industry, Tourism and Investment (ITI) under Executive Council Member, Minister David Ramsay.

The Act further outlines that oil and gas activities within the Inuvialuit Settlement Region (ISR) are regulated by the National Energy Board (NEB) abiding the new devolution territorial legislation to ensure consistent management of resources that overlap onshore/offshore.

Still, offshore oil and gas development will remain under the authority of the NEB, but under federal legislation.

== Significance ==
The Act allows the Government of the Northwest Territories the ability to effectively gather and share resource revenues generated by the territory.

According to the Aboriginal Affairs department of Canada, it ensures that all stakeholders and the Northwest Territories Aboriginal communities are included in regulating and in any decision-making process regarding onshore resources in the Northwest Territories by showing consideration for traditional life of the indigenous people and their representation. While partnerships between governments ensures sustainable development that is aligned with Northwest Territories own values and agenda.

Indirect importance is shown through Bob McLeod, Premier of Northwest Territories that said this act is the “long-term priority for the people of the Northwest Territories and for the Government of Canada” towards the occupation of a stronger and prosperous North and Canada as a ‘Northern Nation’. This displays Canada's resolve towards Canada's Northern Strategy and being recognized as the right to claim sovereignty of the Northern Arctic and resources like oil.

Through the Act, Canada is taking steps to build a political case towards sovereignty claims internationally, but also empowering the territories to become more politically and strategically involved with Canada's growth in natural resource sector and economy.

== Criticisms ==
Some criticisms in implementing this Act is the lack of responsible governance of the minister department ITI (Industry, Tourism and Investment) concerning key decision-making positions (Chief Conservation officer and Chief Safety officer) and maintaining transparency with the public on any site development activity and orders they have approved of.

Recently the ITI announced they would enter a two-year contract with Alberta Energy Regulator (AER), in which somebody from there could possibly fill those positions. This is seen controversial to the Northwest Territories and Canadian citizens since AER has a poor track record of not imposing its own legislation.

Another critic made by the public is that the Government of the Northwest Territories is quickly expanding its fracking operations in oil and gas development without doing thorough environmental impact assessments that hydraulic fracturing will have on those regions. This led to Government of the Northwest territories announcing plans to impose its own regulations that will consult with advisors, stakeholders and meet credentials of the best practices, but will continues to push forward motions to frack.
