= Paula Simons =

Canadian senator (born 1964)

The Honourable Paula Simons

Canadian Senator from Alberta
- Incumbent
- Assumed office October 3, 2018
- Nominated by: Justin Trudeau
- Appointed by: Julie Payette
- Preceded by: Claudette Tardif

Personal details
- Born: September 7, 1964 (age 62) Edmonton, Alberta, Canada
- Party: Independent Senators Group
- Education: University of Alberta (B.A.); Stanford University (M.A.)
- Occupation: Journalist
- Website: senatorpaulasimons.ca

Paula Simons (born September 7, 1964) is a Canadian politician and former journalist who has been a senator from Alberta since 2018. Simons was appointed to the Senate of Canada on the advice of Prime Minister Justin Trudeau and sits as a member of the Independent Senators Group (ISG) caucus. She is best known for her work with the Edmonton Journal and has also worked for as a producer for CBC Radio.

== Early life and education ==
Simons was born and raised in Edmonton, Alberta, one of two children born to Norman Wolfe and Oli (née Dyck) Simons. Her father, a lawyer, was of Jewish descent; he was raised in Round Hill, Alberta, where his parents had settled after immigrating from Russia. She earned an honours bachelor of arts degree in English literature and minor in French and comparative literature from the University of Alberta in 1986, and a master's degree in journalism from Stanford University, before spending time as a fellow at the Poynter Institute for Media Studies.

She is married to a man described as the eldest son of "a brave and resourceful single mother" and "the best kind of feminist" in a column celebrating their 25th wedding anniversary, and they have children including a daughter who lives in Vancouver.

== Journalism career ==
Simons returned to Canada in the winter of 1988 and secured a position as a part-time weekend copy editor at the Alberta Report, then as a producer for CBC Radio in Toronto and Edmonton from 1989 to 1995.

=== Edmonton Journal ===
Joining in 1995, Simons is best known for her work as a journalist with the Edmonton Journal newspaper, where she was a political columnist and investigative journalist. She became a columnist on city affairs in 2001.

Over the course of her 23 years with the Journal, Simons earned two National Newspaper Awards for her investigations and analysis of Alberta's troubled child welfare system. Her investigative work on Indigenous child welfare and government cover-ups of the deaths of children in foster care also earned her recognition from the UNESCO Canadian Committee for World Press Freedom, and from Journalists for Human Rights. Simons was part of two Edmonton Journal “breaking news” teams that won National Newspaper Awards for their coverage of the 2016 Fort McMurray wildfire and for their stories on the murders of four RCMP officers in 2005 at Rochfort Bridge, Alberta. She earned six further National Newspaper Award citations of merit for her columns and editorials on Alberta politics. She also received recognition from the Alberta Centre for Civil Liberties Research for her work championing LGBQT rights, from the Canadian Bar Association for her writing on legal affairs, from the Canadian Mental Health Association for her columns on mental health care, and from the Edmonton Historical Board for her work as a popular historian and champion of heritage preservation.

==== 2015 Alberta general election ====
Simons disclosed in the final days of the run-up to the 2015 Alberta general election that the editorial board of the Edmonton Journal had been under pressure from the paper's parent company Post Media, and namely its CEO Paul Godfrey, to endorse the incumbent Progressive Conservative Party of Alberta and its leader Jim Prentice. While their Alberta coverage was deemed to have "reported quite fairly during the election", Post Media was strongly criticized by Simons and many of her fellow journalists (and some of the public) for presenting the Journal as a neutral, local source without partisan bias when in fact they were facing pressure to advocate for one specific candidate. Traditionally, newspapers are expected to disclose their bias through an endorsement, as the Journal did in the 2019 Alberta election when they endorsed the United Conservative Party (UCP) leader Jason Kenney.

== Political career ==
Simons was appointed to the Senate of Canada on October 3, 2018, by Governor General Julie Payette on the advice of Prime Minister Justin Trudeau.

Simons previously criticized the process for Senate appointments. In a column written in 2013, while the Stephen Harper government was still in power, Simons wrote about Senate appointments and entitlement: "These days, the Senate is failing on almost every front. Instead of being appointed on merit, all too often senators get the gig because they're political cronies or party loyalists, bagmen (and women) who have primarily distinguished themselves as rabid partisans or backroom boys, not deep thinkers."
