= Tragedy in the Commons =

2014 book by Alison Loat and Michael MacMillan

Tragedy in the Commons is a 2014 book written by the co-founders of Samara Canada, Alison Loat and Michael MacMillan (ISBN 978-0-307-36129-5). The book puts forth several arguments about a crisis facing Canadian politics and the institution of Parliament as a whole. It is backed by primary research conducted by Samara including "exit interviews" with 80 former Members of Parliament.

== Origin of the title ==
Tragedy in the Commons is a variation of Garrett Hardin's "Tragedy of the Commons". In Hardin's argument, the commons as a whole suffers when individuals (in Hardin's case, farmers) behave selfishly and contrary to the good of the commons. As well, each person is demotivated from changing their ways, since they will be putting themselves at an economic disadvantage unless the other individuals agree to live by the same rules.

Loat and MacMillan apply this as a metaphor to a "tragedy of the Commons", referring to the House of Commons.

== Primary sources ==
The authors interviewed 80 former Members of Parliament from all major political parties, including the Liberal Party of Canada, Conservative Party of Canada, New Democratic Party of Canada, Bloc Quebecois, and the former Canadian Alliance, Progressive Conservative Party of Canada, and Reform Party of Canada.

Those MPs came from a variety of professional backgrounds, geographic representation, and parliamentary experience. They included members who served in Opposition and cabinet, as party leaders and as backbench MPs.

MPs interviewed included Paul Martin, David Anderson, Susan Barnes, Ed Broadbent, Claudette Bradshaw, Joseph Comuzzi, Guy Cote, Roy Cullen, Roger Gallaway, John Godfrey, Bill Graham, Keith Martin, Inky Mark, Jay Hill, Monte Solberg, Chuck Strahl, and Andrew Telegdi.

== Tragedies of the Commons ==
Loat and MacMillan argue that there are several unique yet related "tragedies" in the way the Canadian House of Commons currently operates. They are:

1. Candidates for election have to frequently be coerced and pushed into running for elected office. Because of this, elected MPs see themselves as "outsiders" of the political process, which results in a lack of ownership behind political institutions.
2. There is no universally agreed upon job description for Members of Parliament, leaving each person to figure it out for themselves.
3. The rules for being nominated as a political party's candidate in a riding are opaque and unclear, and frequently seen as being bent, ignored, or broken for star candidates.
4. The behaviour of MPs in the House of Commons, especially during Question Period, is childish and immature, and turns Canadians away from paying attention to political debates.
5. The work that gets done by MPs (bills being passed, government being held to account, and laws being scrutinized) is often done behind closed doors through committee and caucus meetings.
6. The increasing centralization of power in party leaders' offices and, when in government, the Prime Minister's Office. Loat and MacMillan note this started with Pierre Trudeau's government in the 1970s, and has only grown, including in Prime Minister Stephen Harper's government.
7. Because of the increased power in the leaders' offices, MPs are less likely to speak out against their leader or their political party, fearing that they will be demoted, kicked from caucus, unable to fully do their jobs, or will not be considered for cabinet positions or promotions.

Loat and MacMillan note that the resulting tragedy is that Canadians stop paying attention to politics, refusing to engage their elected representatives and becoming increasingly sceptical about an MP's purpose, cost, or mandate.
