= 2018 Canadian federal budget =

2018 Budget of the Canadian Federal Government
- Presented: 27 February 2018
- Country: Canada
- Parliament: 42nd
- Party: Liberal
- Finance minister: Bill Morneau
- Total revenue: 323.4 billion (Projected); 332.2 billion (Actual)
- Total expenditures: 338.5 Billion (Projected); 346.2 billion (Actual)
- Deficit: 18.1 billion (Projected); 14.0 billion (Actual)
- Website: https://www.budget.gc.ca/2018/docs/plan/budget-2018-en.pdf

The Canadian federal budget for fiscal year 2018–19 was presented to the Canadian House of Commons by Finance Minister Bill Morneau on February 27, 2018. The deficit is projected to be $18.1 billion, including a $3 billion adjustment for risk. This was later refined to $14.0 billion when the Annual Financial Report of the Government of Canada for Fiscal Year 2018–2019 was released.

== Financial situation ==
In the Annual Financial Report of the Government of Canada for 2018 - 2019, the Minister of Finance said that the budgetary deficit was $14.0 billion for the FY ending March 31, 2019 and that revenues "increased by $21.0 billion, or 6.7 per cent, from 2017–18." There was an increase of 4.7 per cent ($14.6 billion) in program expenses. The federal debt was $685.5 billion and debt-to-GDP (gross domestic product) ratio was 30.9 per cent which is a decrease from 31.3 per cent in 2018. Public debt charges that had reached a peak of about "30 percent in the mid-1990s" were down to "6.7 per cent of expenses in 2018–19." The report said there was strong growth in most regions of the world in 2016 and 2017 and that global economic expansion was more moderate in 2018. Canada's real GDP grew 3.0 per cent in 2017 and 1.9 per cent in 2018. From the fall of 2015 through March 2019, Canada has added 1 million jobs. The unemployment rate reached its lowest level since 1979.

=== Oil prices ===
Oil prices dropped in the second half of 2018 globally. The price of West Texas Intermediate crude oil increased to nearly US$70 per barrel in October, 2018 which represents its "highest level since before the oil shock." By December WTI dropped to below US$50 per barrel." As a result of the lower price of oil at the end of the year, Canada's nominal GDP was more moderate in 2018 than 2017.

== Environment and Climate Change Canada ==
The federal budget presented in February 2018 included an increase in the Environment and Climate Change Canada's budget to $1.5 billion which represents an increase of 53.5 per cent "more than it was initially allocated" in 2017 and "23.1 per cent more than it ended up spending" in 2017.
