= Harvey Chochinov =

Canadian academic and psychiatrist

Harvey Chochinov OC OM FRSC
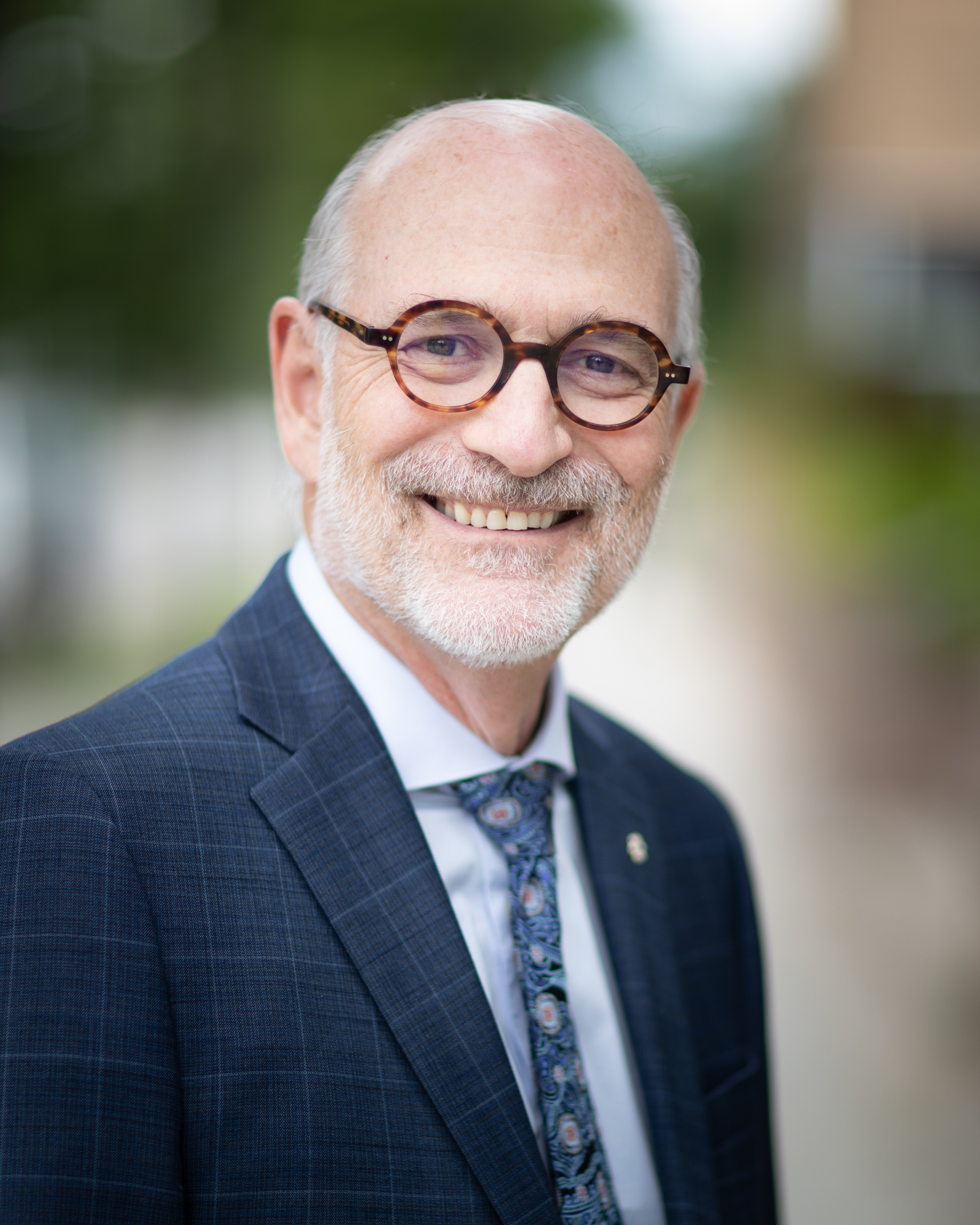
- Born: March 9, 1958 (age 68); Winnipeg, Manitoba, Canada

Academic background
- Education: University of Winnipeg (BA); University of Manitoba (MD, PhD)
- Thesis: Psychiatric Dimensions of Palliative Medicine (1996)

Academic work
- Discipline: Psychiatry
- Sub-discipline: Palliative care
- Institutions: University of Manitoba

Harvey Max Chochinov OC OM FRSC (born March 9, 1958) is a Canadian academic and psychiatrist from Winnipeg, Canada. He is a leading authority on the emotional dimensions of end-of-life, and on supportive and palliative care. He is a Distinguished Professor of Psychiatry at the University of Manitoba and a Senior Scientist at CancerCare Manitoba Research Institute.

Chochinov's research focuses on best practices in psycho-oncology and enhancing the psychological well-being and quality of life of patients with advanced disease. He is credited with meticulously examining the experiential landscape of advanced illness and enriching the care of individuals with advanced illness worldwide.

He completed his MD and PhD (Community Health Sciences) at the University of Manitoba; he completed his residency in psychiatry, followed by a fellowship in psycho-oncology at Memorial Sloan Kettering Cancer Center in New York.

== Career ==
Chochinov is a leading expert in palliative care, with a focus on the dignity of patients, proper communication, and existential suffering. He developed dignity therapy, which is currently used by palliative care practitioners worldwide for its benefits for patients at the end of life, relatives and health professionals. Dignity therapy involves creating a narrative document with the dying patient that gives them the chance to reflect on their life experiences.

He has also developed the Patient Dignity Inventory (PDI), which is an instrument used to measure dignity related distress in patients with life threatening and life limiting disease. It has been translated and validated in multiple languages for broad usage worldwide.

He was co-founder of the Canadian Virtual Hospice, a comprehensive online source of information on advanced illness, palliative care, loss and grief, serving the needs of patients, families and healthcare professionals.

Chochinov has received many prestigious recognitions for his work in psycho-oncology and palliative care, including being appointed an Officer in the Order of Canada and an inductee in the Canadian Medical Hall of Fame in 2020. He is the only psychiatrist to be awarded the Canadian Medical Association's Frederic Newton Gisborne Starr Award, described as the Victoria Cross of Canadian medicine, for his contributions to palliative care.

He is also the only psychiatrist to receive the O. Harold Warwick Prize given for significant advances in cancer control. He is a Fellow in the Royal Society of Canada and the Canadian Academy of Health Sciences.

He received a Lifetime Achievement Award from the Canadian Association of Psychosocial Oncology and the Bernard Fox Award from the International Psycho-Oncology Society.

In 2023, Chochinov received a CCRA Award for Outstanding Achievements in Cancer Research.

== Key appointments ==
Chochinov was offered an appointment to the Senate of Canada in October 2016 by Prime Minister Justin Trudeau to fill one of three vacancies available in Manitoba. On February 2, 2017, the Privy Council Office made public that Dr. Chochinov had advised the Prime Minister that he would not accept the appointment to the Senate, citing "personal, family and professional reasons."

In 2015, Chochinov was appointed by the Government of Canada to chair the External Panel on Options for a Legislative Response to Carter v. Canada which informed eventual legislation on medically-assisted death. Chochinov has raised concerns about medically-assisted death, arguing for the need for better palliative care and for stringent safeguards.

In April 2016, Chochinov was named by the University of Manitoba to Canada's first Research Chair in Palliative Care Medicine.

Earlier appointments include being appointed as a Soros Faculty Scholar on the Project on Death in America in 1996; and being appointed to the Governing Council of the Canadian Institutes of Health Research (CIHR) in 2005—a position he held for eight years, including chairing the Governing Council's Standing Committee on Ethics.

== Publications ==
Chochinov's research has specifically focused on palliative care and experiences associated with life-limiting cancer, including depression, hopelessness, prognostic awareness, suicidality, desire for death, will-to-live, sense of burden to others, quality of life, dependency, spirituality and existential distress. He has also researched the patient-healthcare professional relationship, including elements of effective communication, issues related to equity, diversity and inclusiveness, and core efficiencies of dignity conserving care.

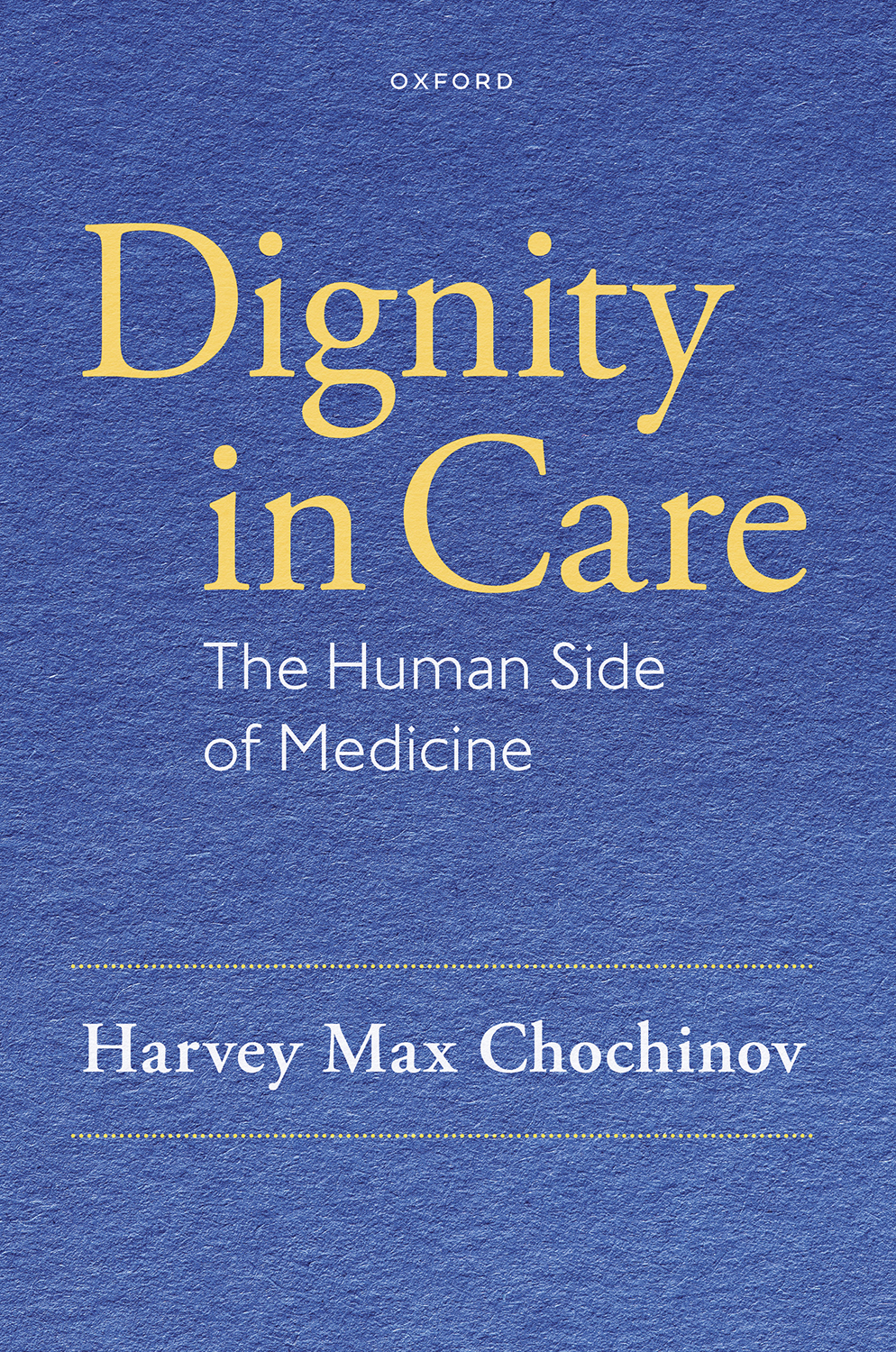
Book cover, Dignity in Care, Dr. Harvey Max Chochinov

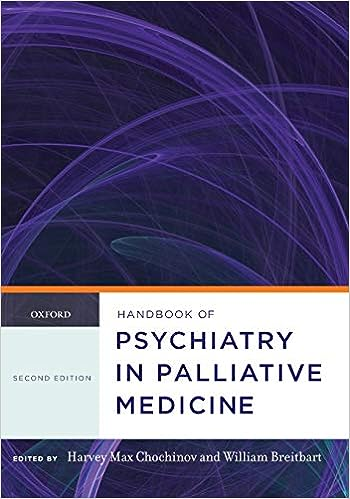
Book cover, Psychiatry in Palliative Medicine by Harvey Max Chochinov

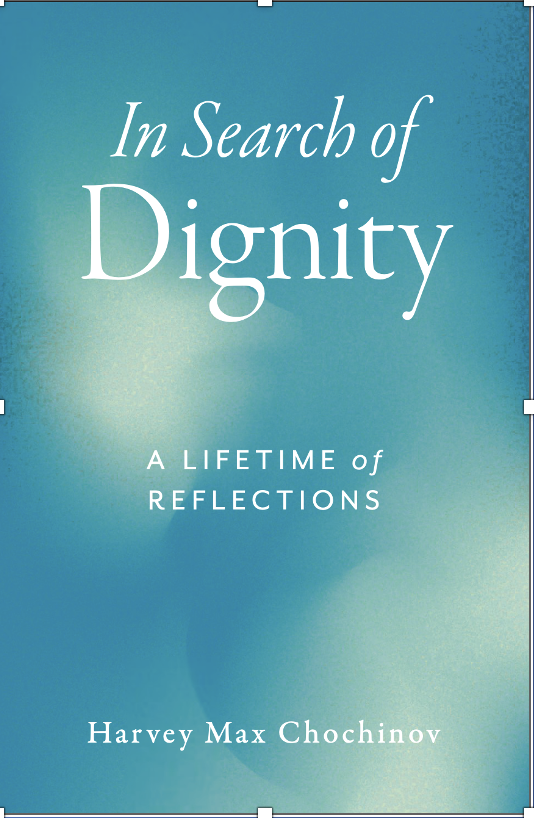
Dr. Harvey Max Chochinov book cover

His research on dignity has provided tangible and practical ways to operationalize considerations of dignity in patient care, including a means of measuring dignity related distress (The Patient Dignity Inventory, translated widely), effective ways of eliciting personhood in clinical practice and a novel narrative-based psychotherapy, coined 'Dignity Therapy.' Dignity Therapy has been implemented in various cancer centres, hospices and palliative care programs around the world. There are also many publications and clinical trials on Dignity Therapy, which explore the merits of such an approach in mitigating distress and enhancing quality of life for patients with life-limiting illness.

His recent publications on The Platinum Rule have received wide attention, addressing issues related to bias, promoting equity, diversity and inclusiveness, and raise the bar on person-centred care.

In 2023, he published a paper introducing the idea of Intensive Caring, which describes a new way of approaching suffering for patients who have lost hope and feel their lives no longer matter.

His book publications include: Dignity Therapy: Final Words for Final Days (Oxford University Press, 2012) which won the Prose Award for Professional and Scholarly Excellence in Clinical Medicine (American Publisher's Award).

He has also published Dignity in Care: The Human Side of Medicine (Oxford University Press, 2022) and The Handbook of Psychiatry in Palliative Medicine: Psychosocial Care for the Terminally Ill (Oxford University Press, 2022).

In 2025, he published In Search of Dignity (Oxford University Press, 2025), a collection of essays tracing Dr. Harvey Max Chochinov’s pioneering career in palliative care. Shaped by decades of research and clinical experience, the book draws on the wisdom of patients nearing death to explore issues that lie at the heart of what it means to be human, vulnerable, and mortal.
