= Sabi Marwah =

Former Canadian Senator and bank executive

The Honourable Sabi Marwah

Canadian Senator from Ontario
- In office November 10, 2016 – September 7, 2023
- Nominated by: Justin Trudeau
- Appointed by: David Johnston

Personal details
- Born: Sarabjit Singh Marwah; July 12, 1951 (age 75) India
- Party: Independent Senators Group
- Education: University of Calcutta; University of Delhi; University of California, Los Angeles
- Profession: Banker; financial analyst

Sarabjit (Sabi) Singh Marwah (born July 12, 1951) is a former member of the Canadian Senate. He is a former vice chairman and chief operating officer of Scotiabank, retiring in 2014 after 35 years with the bank where he began his career as a financial analyst. He has served on the boards of the C.D. Howe Institute, the Toronto International Film Festival, Torstar Corporation, Cineplex Inc., George Weston Ltd., Telus Corp. and the Hospital for Sick Children. He is also a founding member of the Sikh Foundation of Canada.

== Background ==
Marwah is Sikh and was born in India. He earned an undergraduate degree in economics at the University of Calcutta, a master's degree in economics at the University of Delhi, and an MBA from UCLA.

Marwah has an honorary doctorate from Ryerson University for advancing social inclusion in business.

His appointment to the Senate was announced on October 31, 2016. He was the first Sikh to be a member of the Canadian Senate. On September 7, 2023, he resigned from the Senate. At the time of his resignation, he was a member of the Independent Senators Group.
