= Daniel Christmas =

Canadian Senator

The Honourable Daniel Christmas

Senator for Nova Scotia
- In office December 6, 2016 – January 31, 2023
- Nominated by: Justin Trudeau
- Appointed by: David Johnston

Personal details
- Born: September 10, 1956 (age 69) Sydney, Nova Scotia
- Party: Independent Senators Group

Daniel Christmas (born September 10, 1956) is a former Canadian Senator who represented Nova Scotia from 2016 to 2023.

Christmas is from the Mi’kmaw First Nation of Membertou in Nova Scotia. As part of a group of community leaders, he helped turn Membertou from being nearly bankrupt into one of the most successful Canadian First Nations. Christmas is a former advisory services director for the Union of Nova Scotia Indians.

== As Senator ==
On October 27, 2016, Christmas was named to the Senate by Prime Minister Justin Trudeau to sit as an independent. At the time of his appointment, he was an advisor to the Membertou First Nation. He retired from the Senate on January 31, 2023.
