= 2006 Liberal Party of Canada leadership election =

Party election in Canada

- December 3, 2006
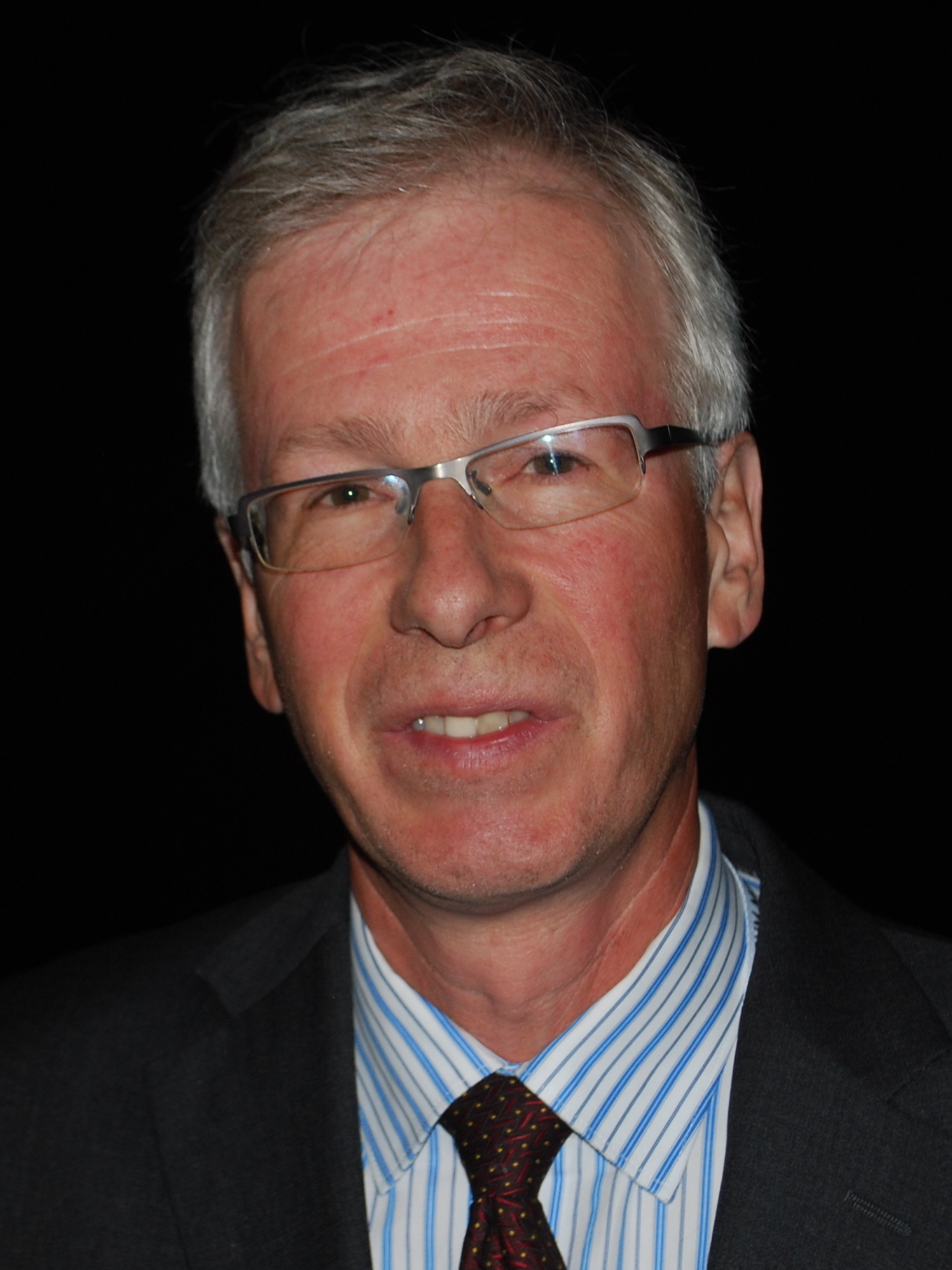

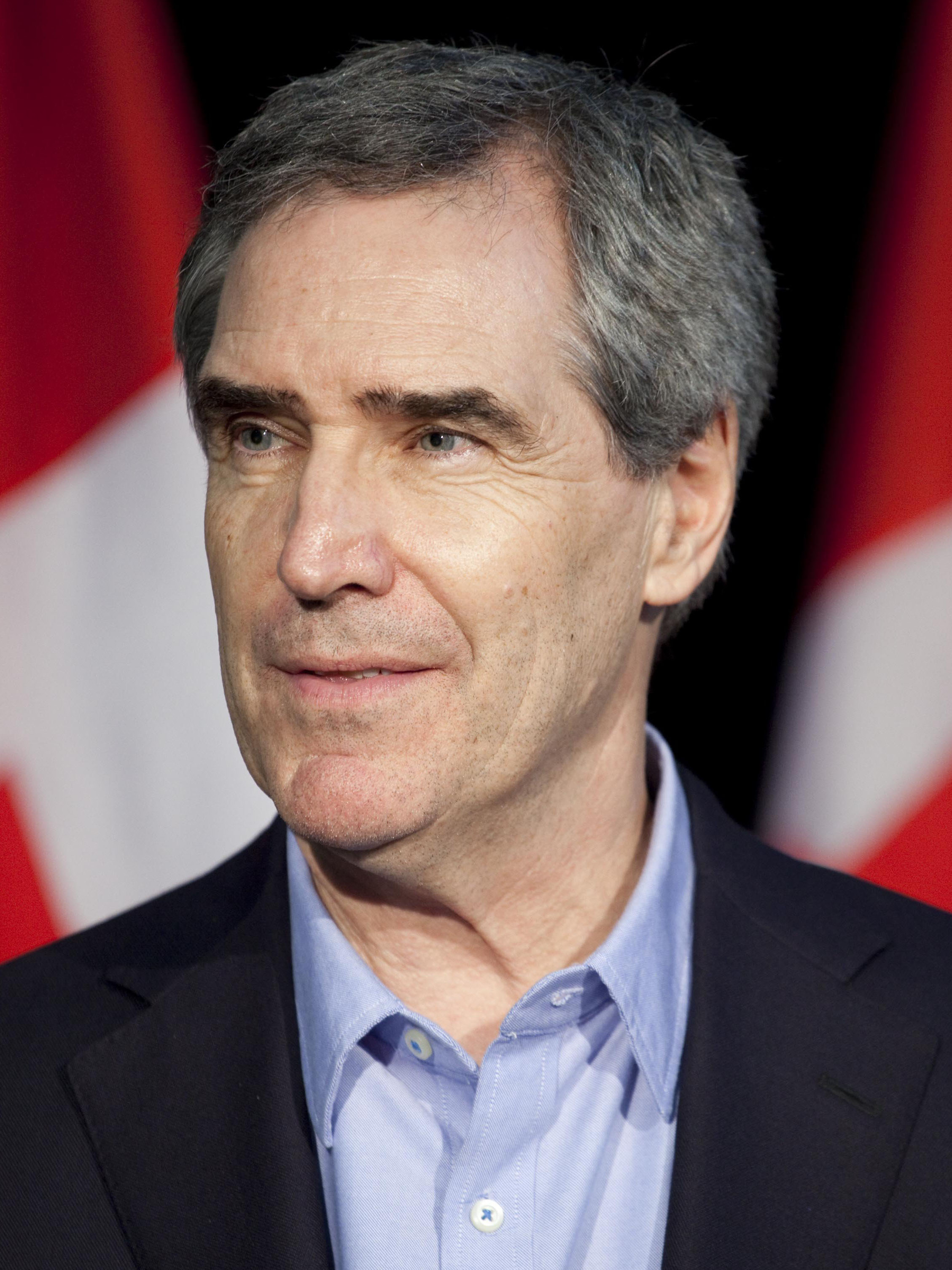

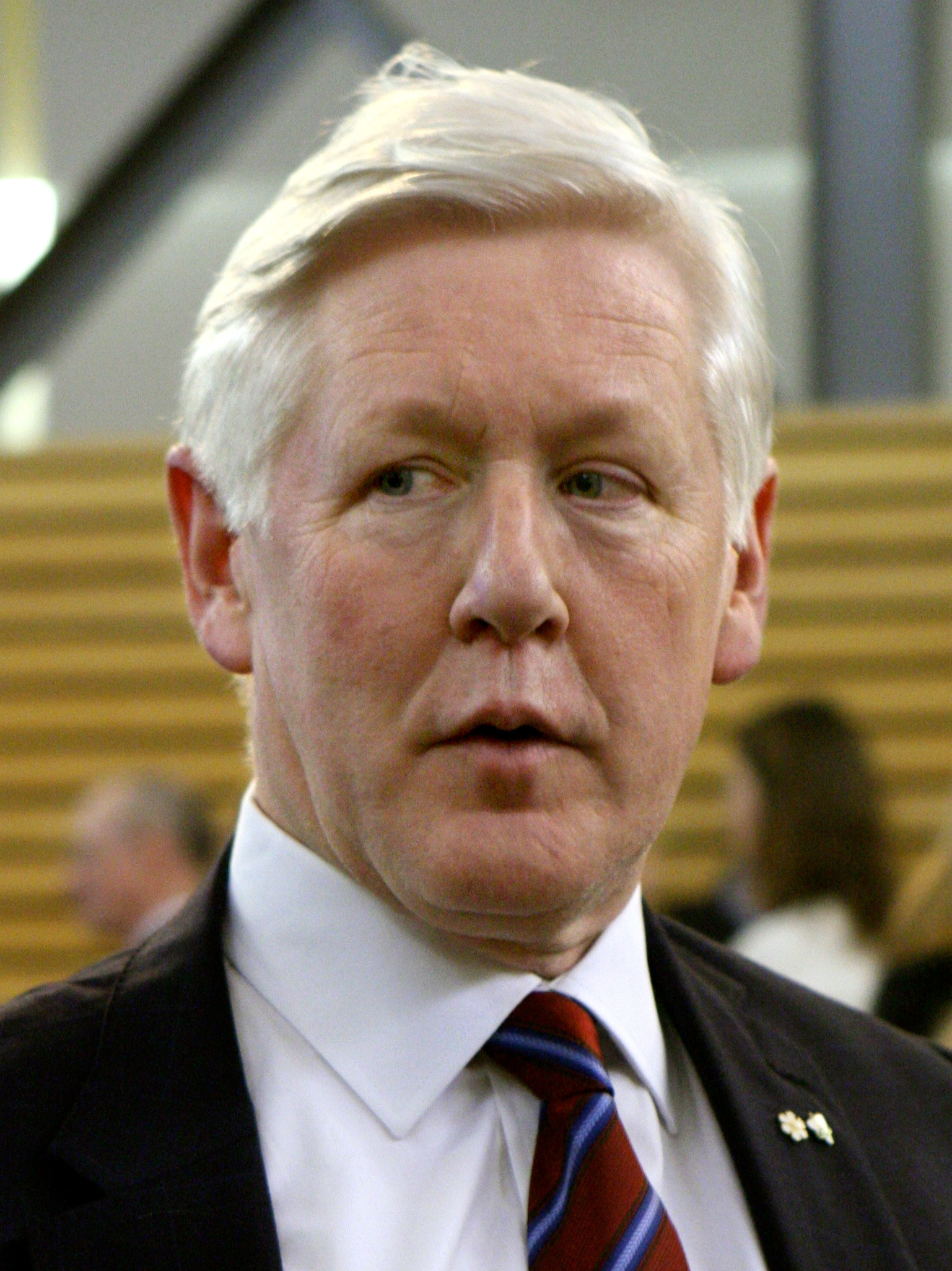

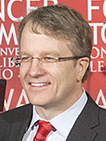
Candidate	Stéphane Dion	Michael Ignatieff
Fourth ballot delegate count	2,521 (54.7%)	2,084 (45.3%)
Third ballot delegate count	1,782 (37.0%)	1,660 (34.5%)
Second ballot delegate count	974 (20.8%)	1,481 (31.6%)
First ballot delegate count	856 (17.8%)	1,412 (29.3%)
Candidate	Bob Rae	Gerard Kennedy
Fourth ballot delegate count	Eliminated	Withdrew
Third ballot delegate count	1,375 (28.5%)	Withdrew
Second ballot delegate count	1,132 (24.1%)	884 (18.8%)
First ballot delegate count	977 (20.3%)	854 (17.7%)
Leader before election
Bill Graham (interim)
Paul Martin (elected)
Elected Leader
Stéphane Dion

2006 Liberal leadership election
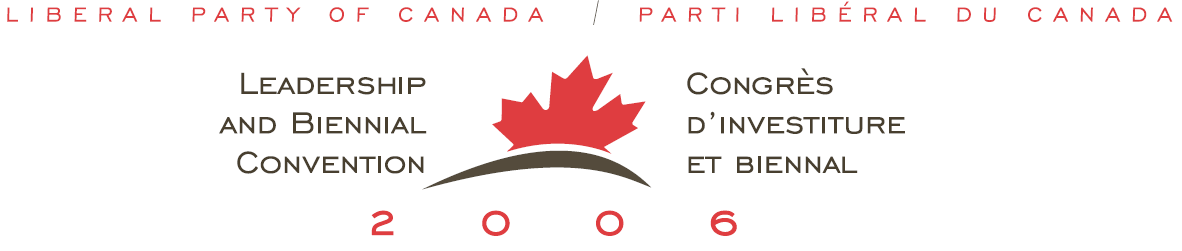
- Date: December 2–3, 2006
- Convention: Palais des congrès de Montréal
- Resigning leader: Paul Martin
- Won by: Stéphane Dion
- Ballots: 4
- Candidates: 8
- Entrance fee: C$50,000
- Spending limit: C$3.4 million

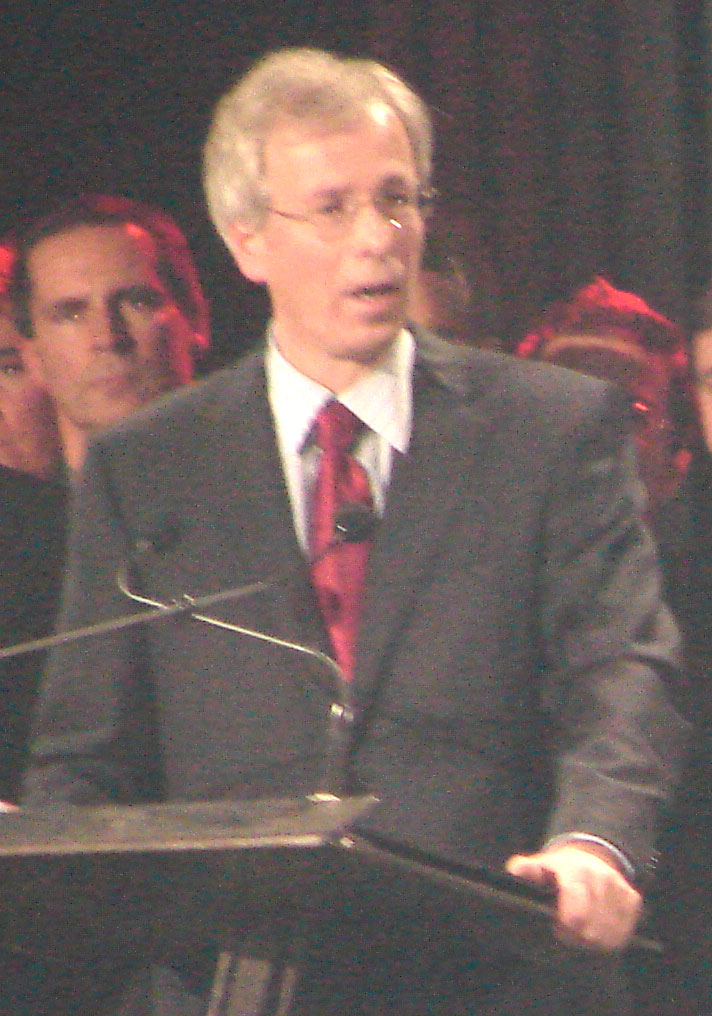
Stéphane Dion, making his acceptance speech after winning the party leadership.

In 2006, the Liberal Party of Canada held a leadership election to choose a successor to outgoing leader Paul Martin. Martin had announced that he would not lead the Liberals into another election, following his party's defeat in the 2006 federal election in Canada. The party's biennial convention, already scheduled to occur from November 29 to December 1, 2006, in Montreal's Palais des congrès, was followed by the party's leadership convention at the same venue occurring December 2 to December 3, 2006.

After four ballots, former cabinet minister and dark horse candidate Stéphane Dion won the leadership on December 2, 2006. As the winner, Dion led the Liberal Party into the 2008 federal election.

This was the only Liberal Party leadership convention in-between 1958 and 2025 in which none of the contenders had previously run for the party's leadership. Michael Ignatieff, who finished as runner-up, would later run again for the party's leadership in 2009 and was elected unopposed, while Martha Hall Findlay, who was eliminated in the first round of this election, ran again in 2013, finishing third.

== Parliamentary leadership until the convention ==
On February 1, 2006, outgoing Prime Minister Paul Martin announced that he would like to continue as leader of the Liberal Party until his successor was chosen but that he would not serve as Leader of the Opposition. Later that day, the Liberal caucus selected Bill Graham, Member of Parliament for Toronto Centre and the outgoing Minister of National Defence, as Leader of the Opposition and interim parliamentary leader in the House of Commons. Graham named Lucienne Robillard, member for Westmount—Ville-Marie and the outgoing Minister of Intergovernmental Affairs, as his deputy leader. Alberta Senator Dan Hays, outgoing speaker of the Senate of Canada, was chosen as Leader of the Opposition in the Senate.

Though Martin initially intended to remain the official leader until the party chose his permanent replacement, the former prime minister announced on March 16, 2006, that his resignation would take effect the following weekend, once the Liberal Party executive set the date of the convention. According to media reports, Martin made his decision to end speculation that he may lead the Liberals into the next election, should the Harper government fall in the following few months.

Bill Graham was given the full-fledged role of interim leader (rather than just interim parliamentary leader) by the National Executive on March 18, 2006. Interim leaders are traditionally expected to be neutral in leadership races and are typically individuals who are not expected to be candidates themselves.

== Rules ==
The date and rules of the convention were decided upon by the Liberal Party National Executive during its meeting on March 18–19, 2006.

The party constitution required that a convention be held within a year of the leader's resignation and that the party's biennial convention be held by March 2007. The leadership convention also served as the party's regular policy convention, so there was debate and voting on policy resolutions and an election for the party's executive.

The process by which the party leader would be chosen involved several thousand delegates, who were elected by riding associations, women's associations, and Young Liberal clubs in proportion to the number of votes they received at a delegate selection meeting of the general membership of that association.

Selection of delegates by riding associations and party clubs occurred on the weekend of September 29 to October 1. Only those who have purchased or renewed their party membership by July 4, 2006, were eligible to vote. Approximately 850 ex officio delegates who automatically gained the right to attend the convention by virtue of being a Liberal member of Parliament, senator, riding association president, past candidate or member of a provincial or territorial association executive board. The Liberal Aboriginal Peoples' Commission was entitled to send a delegation that is in proportion to the percentage of the Canadian population that is Aboriginal. All delegates, except those with ex officio status and those who won election as independent delegates, were bound to a particular candidate on the first ballot, but all delegates were free to vote as they wished on subsequent ballots.

Each candidate had to gather the signatures of at least 300 Liberal Party members, including at least 100 in each of three provinces or territories, and pay a $50,000 fee to enter the contest (down from $75,000 at the previous convention). The spending limit for each campaign was set at $3.4 million, down from $4 million. All of the first $500,000 raised by each candidate was kept by the candidate's campaign, and any amount raised above that figure was subject to a 20% levy by the party. In contrast to the previous campaign when the sale of party memberships was severely restricted, the executive decided to allow party membership to be purchased online.

The Convention Organization Committee and the convention proceedings were co-chaired by Dominic LeBlanc and Tanya Kappo. Steven MacKinnon, the National Director of the party, was the general secretary of the convention.

The deadline for candidates to enter the race was September 30.

The voting was done in two stages on the ballot:

1. The top part of the ballot listed the names of each of the leadership candidates; party members could vote for a candidate or remain undeclared.
2. The second part of the ballot listed names of prospective delegates who were standing on behalf of the various leadership candidates.
  - Riding associations had fourteen delegate positions: four men, four women, two seniors (over age 65) and four youths (under 26).
  - Women's clubs had two delegate position each.
  - Youth clubs and seniors' clubs each had four delegates, of which two were male and two were female.

Ex officio delegates could automatically attend and vote at the convention without the requirement of getting elected. Ex officio delegates included MPs, senators, riding association presidents, immediate past candidates, and a certain number of party executive members and members of the executive of various Liberal Party Commissions (such as the national youth commission, national women's commission, national Aboriginal commission, etc.) and provincial sections of the federal party as laid out in Section 16(13) of the party constitution.

At the convention, the first ballot by elected delegates was preset according by proportional representation according to the amount of support each leadership candidate received at the delegate selection meeting (the "leadership portion" of the ballot cast at riding association or club meetings), even if the delegate has personally expressed support for another candidate. Ex officio and undeclared delegates could vote however they wish, while declared delegates were compelled to vote for their declared candidate, their only other choice being to abstain from voting on the first round. On the second ballot (which occurred because no leadership candidate received over 50% of the vote on the first ballot), all delegates were free to vote according to their personal preference.

== Analysis ==
As the possibility of a 2006 Liberal leadership convention emerged during the midpoint of the election campaign, most media speculation focused on the surfeit of potential candidates poised to replace Martin. Some optimistically billed this convention as being most likely to provide a broad field of skilled contenders not seen since the 1968 convention that included Pierre Trudeau, Robert Winters, Paul Martin, Sr., John Turner, Joe Greene, Mitchell Sharp and Allan MacEachen. Such speculation seemed rooted in the assumption that high-profile members of the Chrétien cabinet that had elected not to challenge the Martin juggernaut in 2003 (most commonly enumerated as John Manley, Allan Rock, Brian Tobin and Martin Cauchon) would return to federal politics, along with 2003 runner-up Sheila Copps and Martin's own presumptive heir Frank McKenna, prompting a balanced matchup between multiple household names.

Instead, all of the above-mentioned politicians did not enter the race. Some commentators stated that this was because of a prevailing view that the Liberal Party would spend an extended period in opposition (as opposed to prior conventions where winning the party leadership came with some certainty of becoming Prime Minister). Others suggested reported party debt contributed to decisions to back down. For his part, McKenna cited personal toll of the leadership position as the top reason he did not run. There were conflicting views on whether the widespread reticence signalled that the Liberal leadership is undesirable or that a "wide open" leadership race would free the party from past baggage.

In May 2006, The Globe and Mail newspaper reported that the then-eleven candidates were tested for bilingualism certificates by University of Ottawa professor Hélène Knoerr. Seven received passing scores: Bob Rae and Michael Ignatieff both received top scores, while Stéphane Dion (who was tested on his English fluency), Joe Volpe, Martha Hall Findlay, Gerard Kennedy and Maurizio Bevilacqua also were graded as bilingual. (Bevilacqua later dropped out of the race.) The remaining candidates all failed the test, whereby each candidate was asked the same four questions and graded based on their syntax, vocabulary, and grammar. Hedy Fry (who also withdrew) did not finish the interview. The newspaper initially errantly reported that Kennedy and Bevilacqua had failed to meet fluency requirements in French, but later retracted this statement.

The unofficial Liberal Party tradition was to alternate between francophone and anglophone leaders, a tradition informally known as alternance. This tradition would be broken if any candidate other than Stéphane Dion were to win. However, the alternance principle was not widely cited as a specific campaign issue. In fact, throughout the campaign, Dion was considered an "underdog" candidate among the "top tier" (with Rae and Ignatieff at the very top). Although polls consistently showed him as a popular second choice of delegates committed to other candidates, Dion's status as a Quebecer was widely considered a handicap, with conventional wisdom suggesting that the party was unlikely to turn to its third consecutive leader from Quebec. However Dion's chances, along with those of Brison, Dryden and Volpe, appeared bolstered by another informal party tradition: Since Mackenzie King succeeded Wilfrid Laurier in 1919, every Liberal leader had served in the previous leader's Cabinet. At that point in time, aside from incumbent Liberal leader Alexander MacKenzie, Edward Blake and Mackenzie King were the only Liberal leaders that had never served in the Cabinet of a previous Liberal leader.

Early in the race the field of declared contenders was often described as having a first tier of six potential winners (the "big six") most commonly cited as consisting of Scott Brison, Stéphane Dion, Ken Dryden, Michael Ignatieff, Gerard Kennedy and Bob Rae. By August 2006, most news articles cited the top-tier of consisting of only three, or four potential winners most commonly cited as Dion, Ignatieff and Rae but also occasionally including Kennedy. In October 2006, the Toronto Star reported that Kennedy and Dion's campaigns were holding talks about a potential alliance. The paper speculated (accurately, as it would turn out) that this alliance would be likely to win as their combined delegates would surpass both Ignatieff and Rae.

=== Opinion polls ===
According to an opinion poll of Liberal party members by The Globe and Mail, conducted from September 12–18, Michael Ignatieff enjoyed a slim lead over the pack with 19% support. The remaining candidates' support was calculated at: 17% for Bob Rae, 13% for Stéphane Dion, 9% for Gerard Kennedy, 9% for Ken Dryden, 3% for Scott Brison, 2% for Joe Volpe, 1% for Martha Hall Findlay, and less than 1% for Hedy Fry. The poll found that 27% of party members did not know or were undecided about their choice. The poll foretold Ignatieff's potential second-ballot weakness: 12% selected him as their second choice, compared to 23% for Rae and 17% for Dion. However, the poll's accuracy was questioned at the time since it was taken based on membership lists provided by Brison, Dryden and Dion. Still, a poll of Liberal party members in Ontario and Quebec by EKOS Research Associates for the Toronto Star and La Presse, conducted from September 17–24, showed similar results with Rae and Ignatieff supported by 25% each, Dion by 17% and Kennedy by 16%. Rae and Dion again had strong support for second choice at 27% each, compared with 19% for Ignatieff.

Party insiders suggested that Ignatieff would have to secure at least 35% of the delegates elected on "Super Weekend" to avoid being overtaken in subsequent ballots. Although he won the most delegates overall on that weekend, he did not reach the 35% target. An anonymous source speculated to the BBC that Ignatieff's 30-year absence from Canada and his initial support for the U.S.-led invasion of Iraq played against him in the election. Patrick Gossage, a Toronto political consultant and Ignatieff supporter, explained his eventual loss this way: "There were people saying, 'Who is this telling us what he's going to do with the party?' Even though he was supported by the party establishment he nevertheless was an outsider, and he never successfully dealt with the labels the media put on him that he'd been away for 30 years." Lauren P. S. Epstein, the former prime minister of the Harvard Canadian Club, said: "What it came down to in the final vote was that the Liberal delegates were looking for someone who was more likely to unite the party; Ignatieff had ardent supporters, but at the same time, he had people who would never under any circumstances support him." Running second in many polls but with strong second choice support, Bob Rae looked like the most likely candidate to capitalize on Ignatieff's second ballot weakness. However, critics cited Rae's turbulent tenure as Ontario Premier in the early to mid 1990s, arguing that electoral success in Ontario was essential for forming government.

== Registered candidates ==
Individuals who gathered the necessary signatures from 300 party members and paid the first $25,000 installment of the entry fee:

=== Scott Brison ===
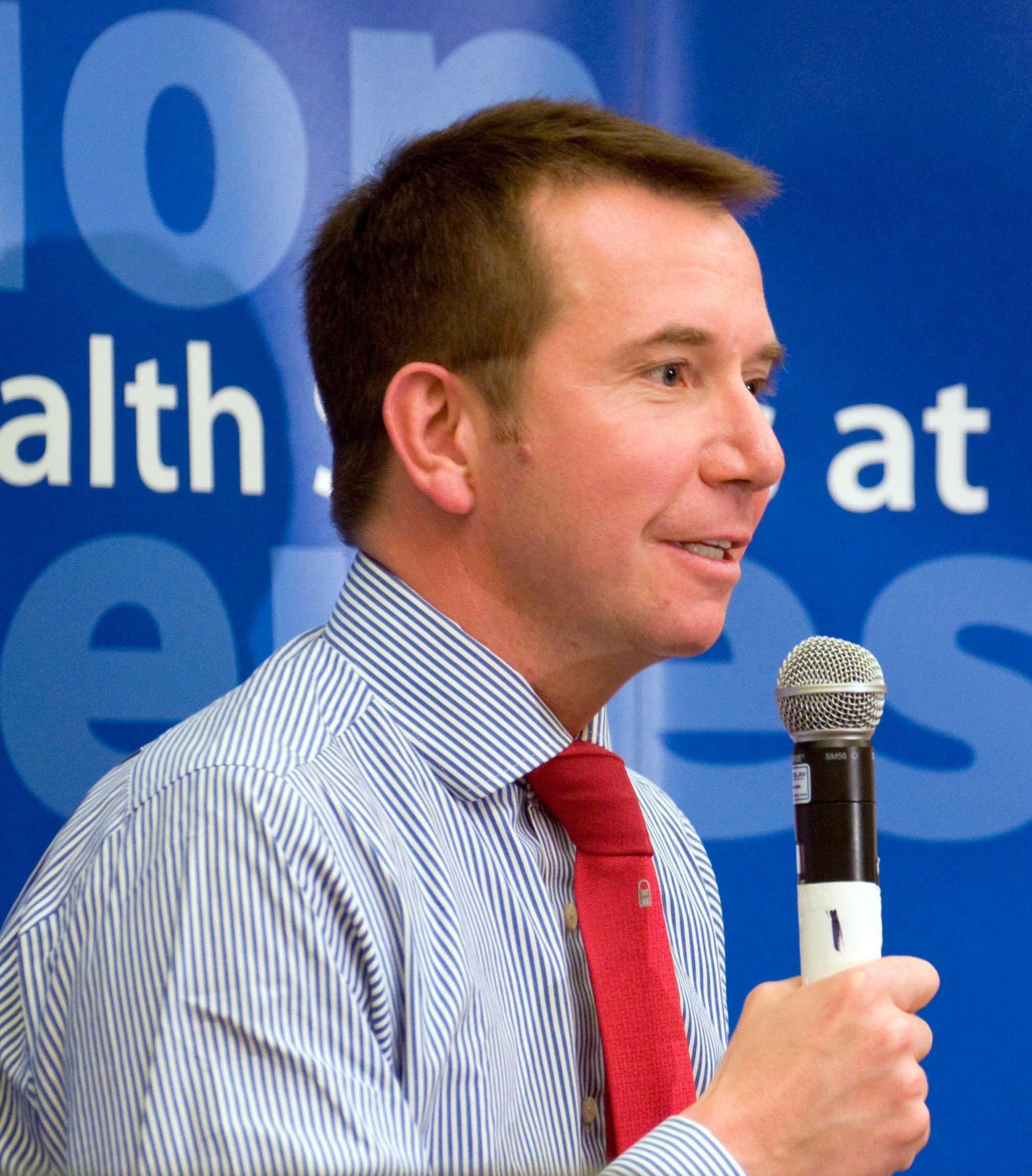

Scott Brison, 39, was the MP for Kings—Hants and was Minister of Public Works and Government Services under Martin. He had previously been a Progressive Conservative MP (since 1997) and had in fact made a previous attempt at that party's leadership in their 2003 leadership election. Brison crossed the floor later that year to join the Liberals shortly after the creation of the Conservative Party of Canada. An openly gay former investment banker, Brison presented fiscally moderate and socially progressive positions. His PC leadership platform had called for Employment Insurance reform, more private involvement in healthcare, integrated defense strategy with the US, and socially liberal policies. His 2006 Liberal leadership platform emphasised the candidate as a "defender of the environment, business innovation and socially progressive values."

==== High profile supporters ====
Former New Brunswick Premier Frank McKenna, considered the leading contender until he announced he was not running in the race, had donated $3000 to Brison's campaign in August and formally endorsed Brison on November 30.

Supporters in caucus prior to first ballot: 10
MPs: 4 Scott Brison, Mark Eyking, Shawn Murphy, Michael Savage
Senators: 6 Sen. Jane Cordy, Sen. Jim Cowan, Sen. Joseph Day, Sen. Michael Kirby, Sen. Wilfred Moore, Sen. Gerard Phalen.

Date campaign launched: April 22, 2006
Date officially registered: May 25, 2006
Number of ballots: 1
Result: Following the first ballot, he announced that he would withdraw from the race and support Rae. He endorsed Ignatieff upon Rae's elimination after the third ballot.

=== Stéphane Dion ===
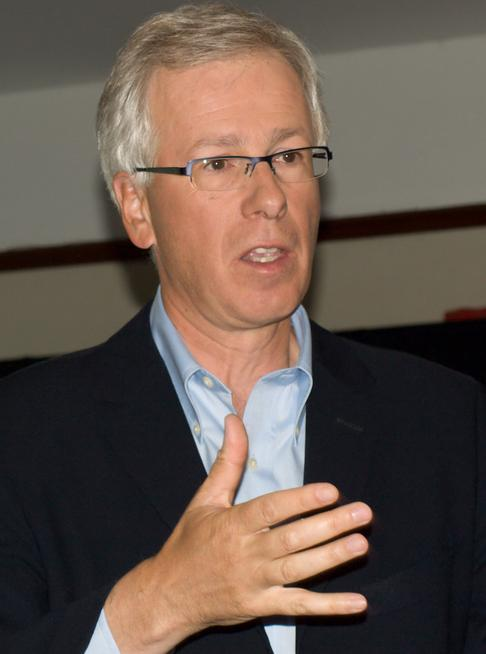

Stéphane Dion, 51, had been Intergovernmental Affairs minister (1996–2003) under Chrétien, Environment minister (2004–2006) under Martin. Before entering federal politics by his 1996 appointment to cabinet followed shortly by his election to parliament from Saint-Laurent—Cartierville, Dion was a professor of political science and noted federalist commentator. He was noted for vocally opposing Quebec sovereigntism and supporting for measures such as the Clarity Act. He was considered a Chrétien loyalist who nonetheless worked well with the Martin camp. Dion announced his candidacy on April 7.

==== High-profile supporters ====
Former Liberal House Leader Don Boudria served as Dion's Campaign Chair and Paul Martin's BC Lieutenant Mark Marissen was his National Campaign Director. One-time Progressive Conservative leadership aspirant David Orchard also announced his support of Dion. Additional high-profile supporters included then-leader of the Saskatchewan Liberal Party David Karwacki, Jamie Elmhirst, the president of the British Columbia wing of the Party, Adam Campbell, the president of the Alberta wing of the Party, former Green Party of Canada deputy leader Tom Manley, former prime minister Paul Martin's Chief of Staff Tim Murphy, Herb Metcalfe, former John Manley Campaign Chair, and Marc-Boris Saint-Maurice the co-founder and former leader of the Marijuana Party of Canada. Former Justice minister Allan Rock endorsed Dion on December 1.

At the convention, Dion received endorsements from eighth-place Martha Hall Findlay (eliminated on the first ballot) and – critically – fourth-place Gerard Kennedy, who withdrew after the second ballot. Ken Dryden and Joe Volpe, who both had endorsed Bob Rae after withdrawing, threw their support to Dion before the final ballot as well.

Supporters in caucus prior to first ballot: 17
MPs: 11 Sue Barnes, Colleen Beaumier, Bonnie Brown, Stéphane Dion, Charles Hubbard, Marlene Jennings, Nancy Karetak-Lindell, Glen Pearson*, Francis Scarpaleggia, Paul Steckle, Bryon Wilfert
Senators: 7 Sen. Tommy Banks, Sen. John Bryden, Sen. Maria Chaput, Sen. Joan Fraser, Sen. Vivienne Poy, Sen. Fernand Robichaud, Sen. Claudette Tardif

- * Glen Pearson is an MP-elect, having won the November 27th by-election in London North Centre.

Supporters picked up after first ballot
MPs: 1 Mark Eyking

Supporters picked up after second ballot
MPs: Omar Alghabra, Navdeep Bains, Raymond Chan, Mark Holland

Supporters picked up after third ballot
MPs: Maurizio Bevilacqua, Ujjal Dosanjh, Ken Dryden, Hedy Fry, John Godfrey, Ralph Goodale, Susan Kadis, Jim Karygiannis, Joe Volpe
Senators: 3 Jerry Grafstein, Frank Mahovlich, Jack Austin

Date campaign launched: April 7, 2006
Date officially registered: May 24, 2006

=== Ken Dryden ===
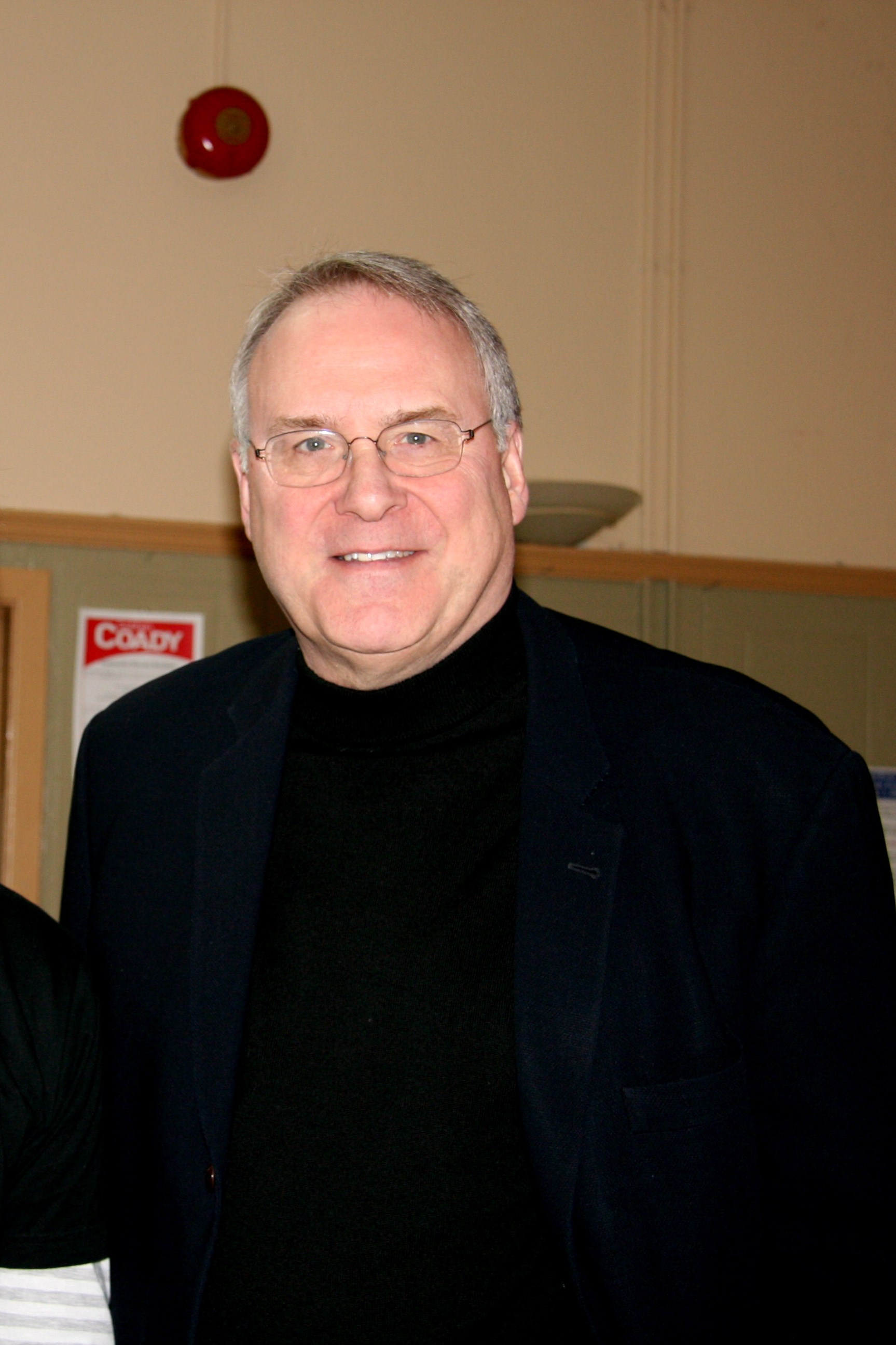

Ken Dryden, 59, had been Social Development minister (2004–2006) under Martin. A former star goaltender for the Montreal Canadiens hockey team, Dryden was elected in 2004 as a star candidate for the Liberals. He was instrumental in putting forward a child care strategy during the Martin government. Dryden, who wrote a book about the public education system, stressed the importance of improving the education system in order to keep Canada competitive. "Learning is at the core of our future—for a person, a society, an economy, a country," Dryden said. "Learning is our only real security, our only real opportunity, and this program, years in the hoping, was the first big step towards truly lifelong learning." He also said Canada's unique, multi-ethnic mix needs to be held up as an example to the world.

Supporters in caucus prior to first ballot: 12
MPs: 5 Don Bell, Ken Boshcoff, Ken Dryden, Tina Keeper, Anita Neville
Senators: 7 Sen. Sharon Carstairs, Sen. Art Eggleton, Sen. Joyce Fairbairn, Sen. Jerry Grafstein, Sen. Frank Mahovlich, Sen. Marilyn Trenholme Counsell, Sen. Rod Zimmer

Date campaign launched: April 28, 2006
Date officially registered: May 29, 2006
Number of ballots: 2
Result: Eliminated after second ballot. He endorsed Rae after the second ballot, then Dion after the third.

=== Martha Hall Findlay ===
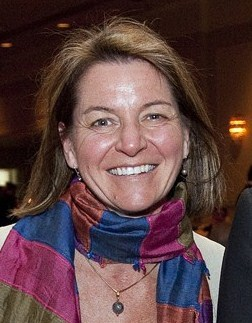

Martha Hall Findlay, 47, was a Toronto lawyer and the first to officially declare her candidacy. She had previously run as a Liberal candidate in the 2004 election, losing to Belinda Stronach in the district of Newmarket—Aurora. When Stronach crossed the floor in 2005, Hall Findlay ceded her Liberal nomination for the riding to Stronach. Fluently bilingual, Hall Findlay worked as the principal of her own management and legal consultancy organization, The General Counsel Group, which works primarily in the high-tech and telecommunications fields in Canada and Europe. On March 17, 2008, Hall Findlay was elected to serve the Toronto constituency of Willowdale as Member of Parliament.

Supporters in caucus prior to first ballot: 1
MPs: 1 Judy Sgro
Senators: 0

Date campaign launched: February 8, 2006
Date officially registered: May 24, 2006
Number of ballots: 1
Result: Eliminated after first ballot. She supported Dion through the remaining ballots.

=== Michael Ignatieff ===
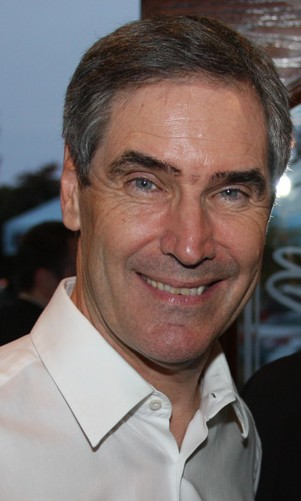

Michael Ignatieff, 59, was a public intellectual, who had worked as a teacher, writer/journalist and politician. For most of his professional life, Ignatieff lectured and wrote outside Canada: first in the United Kingdom at Cambridge University from 1978 to 1984, then in London as a journalist and writer until 2000 when he was named director of the Carr Center for Human Rights Policy at Harvard University. His 1993 novel, Scar Tissue was shortlisted for the Booker Prize. Upon his return to Canada in 2005, he became a visiting professor at the University of Toronto, and in the 2006 federal election campaign he was elected to the Canadian House of Commons as MP for Etobicoke—Lakeshore. Ignatieff was a staunch supporter of interventionism and favoured the 2003 Invasion of Iraq, despite the conflict's relative unpopularity in Canada (and eventually in the United States). However, Ignatieff adopted a centre-left position on most domestic social policies.

==== High profile supporters ====
Ignatieff's campaign was co-chaired by Senator David Smith, a powerful Chrétien organizer and chairman emeritus of Canada's largest "cross-border" law firm, MP Denis Coderre, MP Ruby Dhalla, and was initially headed by Ian Davey (son of Senator Keith Davey), Toronto lawyers Alfred Apps (a party fundraiser and former federal candidate), Daniel Brock (former assistant to John Manley and Irwin Cotler) and Paul Lalonde (son of former minister Marc Lalonde). Davey, Apps and Brock had originally recruited Ignatieff to return to Canada in 2004 to be part of the Liberal party and eventually run for the leadership. David Peterson was Ignatieff's honorary campaign co-chair along with former Trudeau cabinet ministers Marc Lalonde and Donald MacDonald, and former Chrétien Minister Jean Augustine. As the candidate with most caucus support, Ignatieff's regional campaigns were mostly headed by parliamentarians (Ontario - Former Martin ministers Jim Peterson and Aileen Carroll, Atlantic Canada - MP Rodger Cuzner, Quebec - MP and former president of the Liberal Party's federal Quebec wing Pablo Rodriguez, British Columbia - MP Stephen Owen, Alberta - Senator Grant Mitchell, Manitoba - MP Raymond Simard. In addition to federal caucus support, Ignatieff was also endorsed by numerous provincial ministers in Ontario and New Brunswick (the two provinces with Liberal governments that are affiliated with the federal party). Before the final ballot of the convention, Ignatieff received an endorsement from seventh-place Scott Brison (who had previously withdrew after the first ballot and endorsed Bob Rae).

Supporters in caucus prior to first ballot: 49
MPs: 39 Larry Bagnell, Mauril Bélanger, Gerry Byrne, John Cannis, Denis Coderre, Roy Cullen, Rodger Cuzner, Sukh Dhaliwal, Jean-Claude D'Amours, Ruby Dhalla, Wayne Easter, Raymonde Folco, Albina Guarnieri, Michael Ignatieff, Derek Lee, John Maloney, Keith Martin, John McCallum, David McGuinty, Joe McGuire, John McKay, Gary Merasty, Maria Minna, Stephen Owen, Jim Peterson, Marcel Proulx, Yasmin Ratansi, Geoff Regan, Pablo Rodriguez, Anthony Rota, Todd Russell, Lloyd St. Amand, Raymond Simard, Paul Szabo, Robert Thibault, Alan Tonks, Roger Valley, Blair Wilson, Paul Zed
Senators: 10 Sen. Lise Bacon, Sen. Roméo Dallaire, Sen. Dennis Dawson, Sen. Francis Fox, Sen. Elizabeth Hubley, Sen. Rose-Marie Losier-Cool, Sen. Pana Papas Merchant, Sen. Grant Mitchell, Sen. Nick Sibbeston, Sen. David Smith

Supporters picked up after second ballot
MPs: 2 Bernard Patry, Scott Simms

Supporters picked up after third ballot
MPs: 3 Scott Brison, Gurbax Malhi, Judy Sgro

Date campaign launched: April 7, 2006
Date officially registered: May 2, 2006
Number of ballots: 4
Result: Lost to Stéphane Dion on the fourth and final ballot.

=== Gerard Kennedy ===
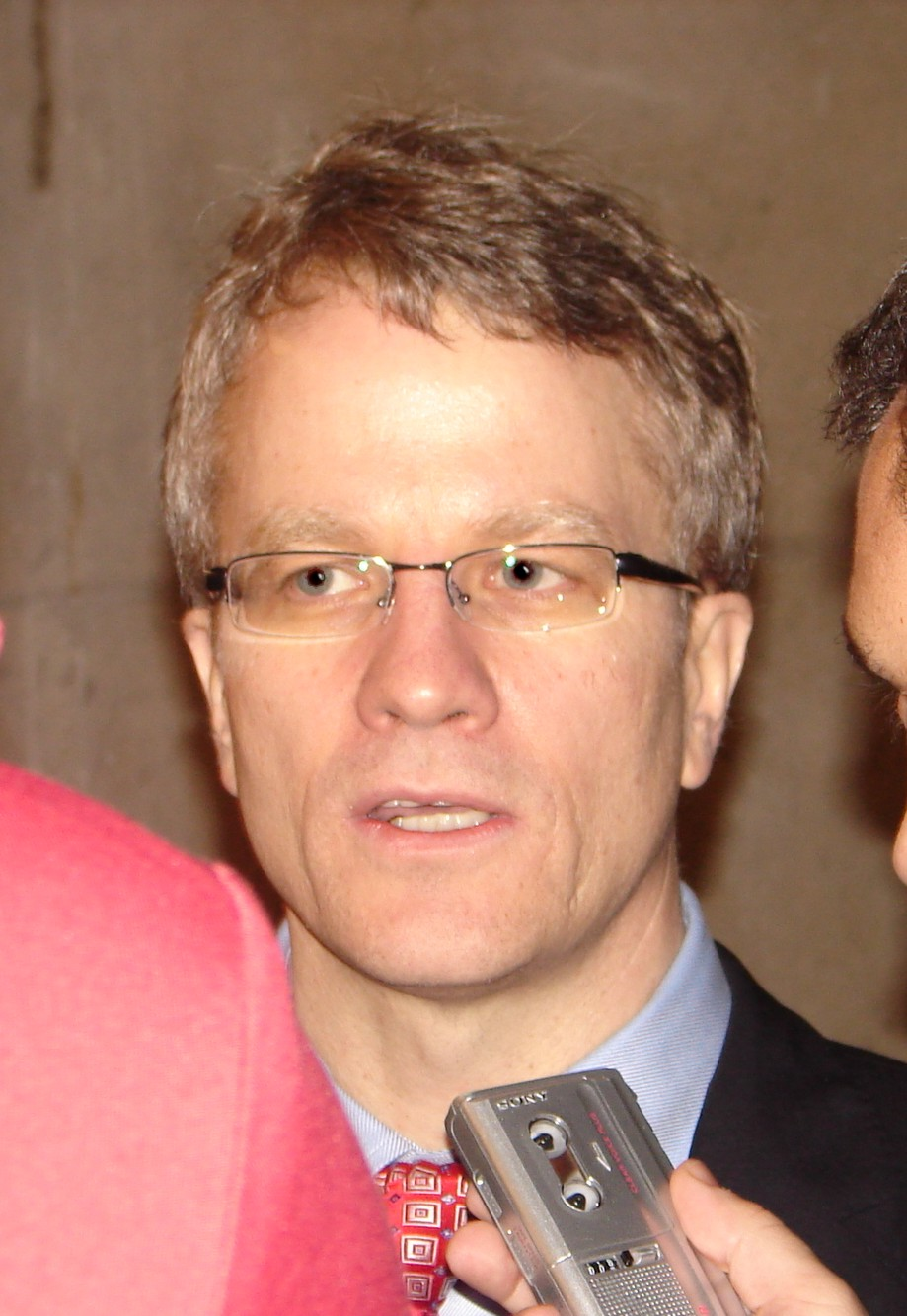

Gerard Kennedy, 46, was Minister of Education in the Ontario provincial government of Dalton McGuinty from 2003 until 2006 when he resigned to enter the federal Liberal leadership campaign. Kennedy was a key player in rebuilding the Ontario Liberal Party and bringing it to government in the 2003 provincial election. As Education Minister, he was widely viewed as having restored faith in the public education system after years of growing support for private schools. He resigned from cabinet on April 5 in order to enter the race. He was the runner-up in the 1996 Ontario Liberal leadership election, having finished in first place on the first four ballots, he was defeated by McGuinty on the fifth and final ballot. He was viewed by many journalists as being on the left wing of the party.

==== High profile supporters ====
Kennedy was backed by Senator Terry Mercer, former national director of the federal Liberal Party. He also enjoyed the support of former premier of Prince Edward Island Keith Milligan and former premier of New Brunswick Ray Frenette. While former cabinet minister Joe Fontana continued to support Kennedy, he resigned his seat in the House of Commons during the leadership campaign to run for Mayor of London. On November 25, The Globe and Mail reported that Justin Trudeau (who would win the 2013 convention and become Prime Minister in 2015) declared support for Kennedy's leadership bid.

Supporters in caucus prior to first ballot: 19
MPs: 13 Omar Alghabra, Navdeep Bains, Brenda Chamberlain, Raymond Chan, Mark Holland, Gurbax Malhi, Dan McTeague, Bernard Patry, Mario Silva, Scott Simms, Brent St. Denis, Andrew Telegdi, Borys Wrzesnewskyj
Senators: 6 Sen. Larry Campbell, Sen. Aurélien Gill, Sen. Sandra Lovelace Nicholas, Sen. Terry Mercer, Sen. Robert Peterson, Sen. Charlie Watt

Date campaign launched: April 27, 2006
Date officially registered: May 17, 2006
Number of ballots: 2
Result: Placed fourth on second ballot. Withdrew to support Dion.

=== Bob Rae ===
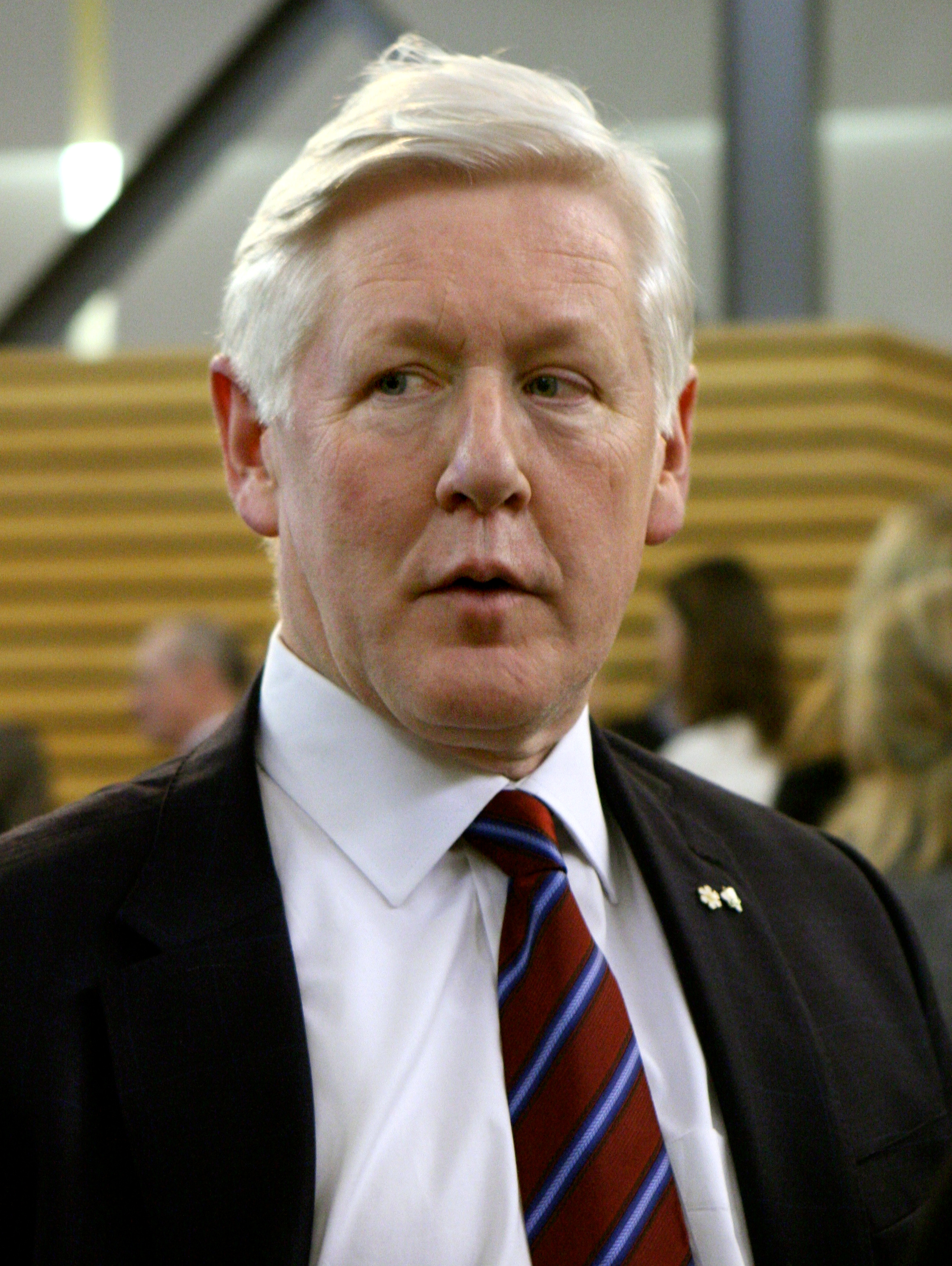

Bob Rae, 58, was the Ontario New Democratic Party Premier of Ontario from 1990 to 1995 and was a federal NDP MP for Broadview—Greenwood in the House of Commons from 1978 to 1982. Since leaving electoral politics, Rae worked on a number of contentious issues for the federal government, most notably the Air India disaster; worked in international relations advising on constitutional issues and conducted a study for the Ontario government on post-secondary education. Rae joined the Liberal Party in April 2006 (he had previously been a Liberal in the 1960s) before launching a centrist campaign that month. In a speech to the Canadian Club of Winnipeg on March 13, 2006, Rae expressed his interest in uniting the 'progressive' forces of Canada in order to regain a majority government in the Canadian House of Commons. "There's a progressive record that's shared by a majority of Canadians, but so far, we have not succeeded in becoming a majority in the House of Commons, so we must think a bit about how that can happen."

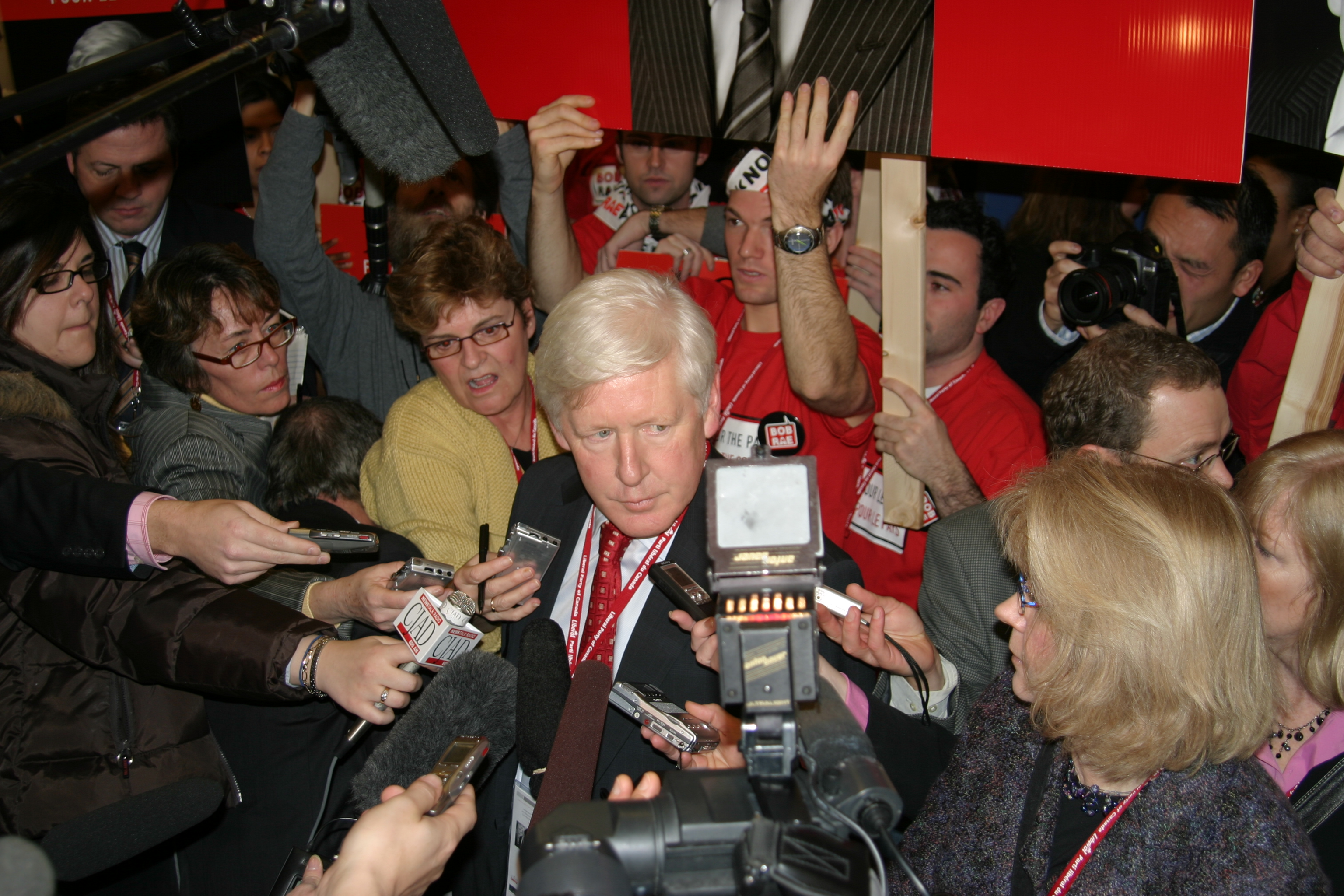
Bob Rae speaking to press at Day 1 of the Liberal Leadership Convention

==== High profile supporters ====
Rae was supported by former senior Chrétien aides, such as his older brother John Rae and Eddie Goldenberg, plus senior Ontario provincial Liberals such as provincial finance minister Greg Sorbara and provincial health minister and Deputy Premier George Smitherman. On May 12, Rae was endorsed by longtime Trudeau cabinet stalwart Allan MacEachen. Former leadership contenders Maurizio Bevilacqua, Carolyn Bennett and Hedy Fry withdrew from the campaign to throw their support to Rae, with Bevilacqua becoming National Co-Chair for the campaign and Chief Advisor on Economic Policy. Susan Kadis, the former Toronto co-chair of Ignatieff's campaign, endorsed Rae on October 27. Former finance minister Ralph Goodale endorsed Rae on November 28.

At the convention, Rae received the most endorsements from defeated candidates prior to the third ballot: Scott Brison and Joe Volpe withdrew after the first ballot to support him, as did Ken Dryden after being knocked off on the second ballot. However, Rae was knocked off the third ballot, and encouraged his delegates to choose the candidate that best suits their personal beliefs. He never disclosed who he voted for on the fourth ballot.

Supporters in caucus prior to first ballot: 26
MPs: 14 Carolyn Bennett, Maurizio Bevilacqua, Irwin Cotler, Ujjal Dosanjh, Hedy Fry, John Godfrey, Ralph Goodale, Susan Kadis, Jim Karygiannis, Lawrence MacAulay, Diane Marleau, Bill Matthews, Brian Murphy, Andy Scott
Senators: 12 Sen. Jack Austin, Sen. Pierre de Bané, Sen. Michel Biron, Sen. Joan Cook, Sen. Mac Harb, Sen. Mobina Jaffer, Sen. Jean Lapointe, Sen. Colin Kenny, Sen. Jim Munson, Sen. Pierrette Ringuette, Sen. Bill Rompkey, Sen. Peter Stollery.

Supporters picked up after first ballot
MPs: 4 Joe Volpe, Wajid Khan, Massimo Pacetti, Scott Brison

Supporters picked up after second ballot
MPs: 7 Ken Boshcoff, Ken Dryden, Tina Keeper, Gurbax Malhi, Judy Sgro, Brent St. Denis, Anita Neville

Date campaign launched: April 24, 2006
Date officially registered: May 11, 2006
Number of Ballots: 3
Result: (Eliminated on the third ballot)

=== Joe Volpe ===
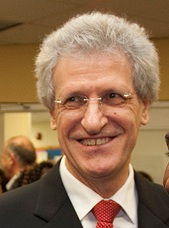

Joe Volpe, 59, was Minister of Human Resources and Skills Development (2003–2005) and Minister of Citizenship and Immigration (2005–2006) under Martin. He announced his candidacy on April 21, 2006. A former schoolteacher, he was elected to the House of Commons in 1988 for the Toronto riding of Eglinton—Lawrence. His top priorities were reinvigorating the party to get it back "on a professional keel." He promised to "make it a good corporate institution that it's been and the nation-building institution that it has always proved to be."

Volpe ran into trouble on June 2 when it was revealed that his campaign had received $5,400 in donations from each of three children under the age of 15 (all were children of executives of the pharmaceutical company Apotex). The donations were later returned but the situation was spoofed by the satirical Web site Youth for Volpe. Sukh Dhaliwal and Yasmin Ratansi subsequently left the Volpe campaign to support Michael Ignatieff.

The Liberal Party of Canada announced a $20,000 fine against Mr. Volpe because his campaign allowed membership forms to be distributed to cultural associations in Quebec without ensuring that new members would pay their own membership fee. Volpe was subsequently exonerated, and the fine was withdrawn.

Supporters in caucus: 5
MPs: 5 Joe Comuzzi, Wajid Khan, Massimo Pacetti, Lui Temelkovski, Joe Volpe
Senators: 0

Date campaign launched: April 21, 2006
Date officially registered: May 12, 2006
Number of Ballots: 1
Result: Following candidate speeches announced that he would withdraw after the first ballot to support Rae. He supported Dion on the final ballot.

== Endorsements ==
See Endorsements for the Liberal Party of Canada leadership election, 2006.

=== Ex officio delegate endorsements ===
See List of ex officio delegates to the Liberal Party of Canada leadership election, 2006

=== Newspaper endorsements ===
Newspaper	Candidate(s) endorsed	Reference
The Globe and Mail	Stéphane Dion	
Le Devoir	Michael Ignatieff	
Montreal Gazette	Stéphane Dion	
Toronto Star	Bob Rae	
Toronto Sun	Stéphane Dion and Martha Hall Findlay	

== Withdrawn candidates ==
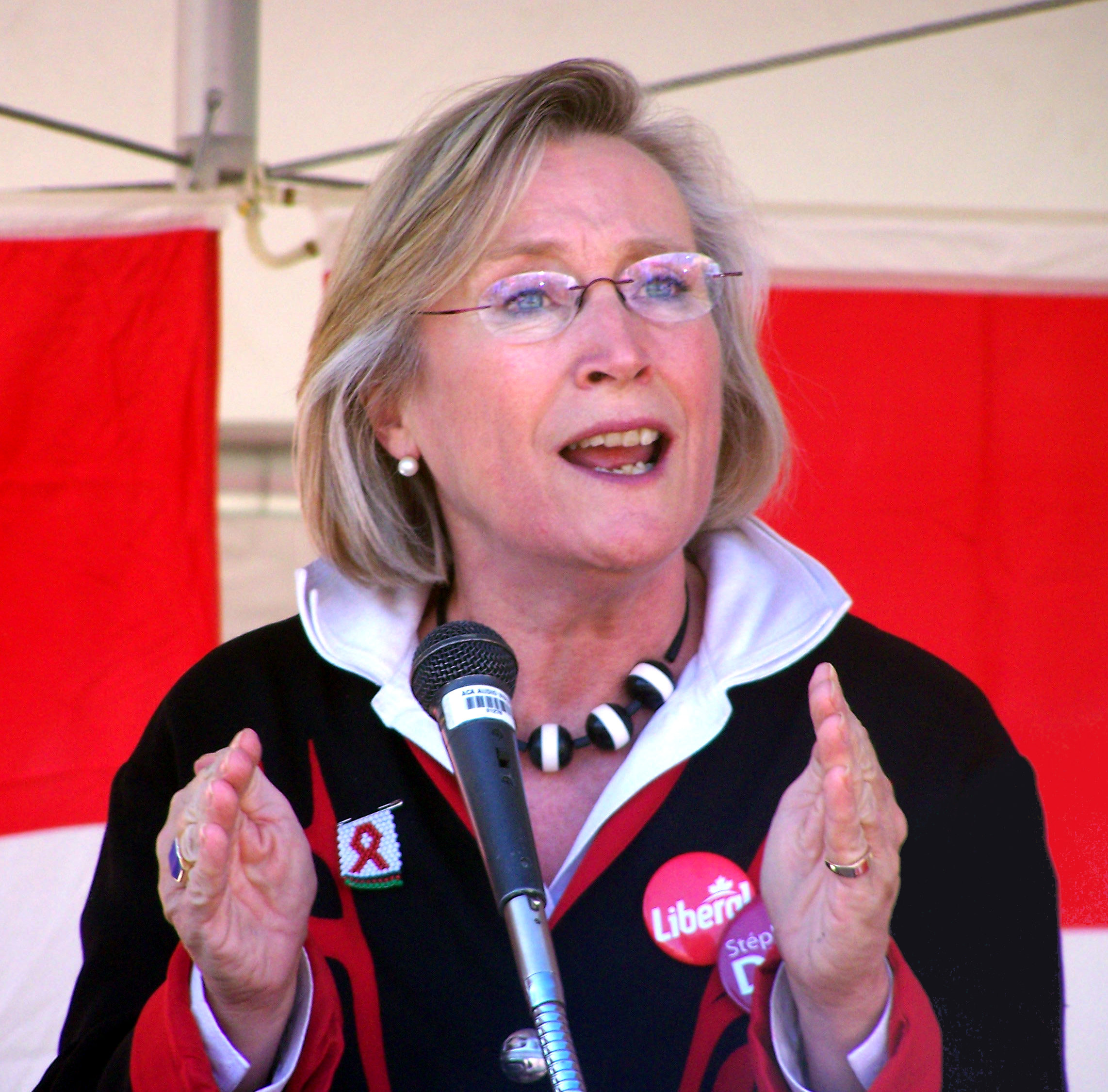

=== Carolyn Bennett ===
Carolyn Bennett announced her entry into the race on April 24, 2006, and withdrew from the race on September 15 to endorse Bob Rae.

=== Maurizio Bevilacqua ===
Maurizio Bevilacqua formally declared his candidacy on April 19 and withdrew from the race on August 14 to endorse Bob Rae.

=== Hedy Fry ===
Hedy Fry entered the race on May 4 and withdrew on September 25 to endorse Bob Rae.

=== John Godfrey ===
John Godfrey announced his entry into the race on March 19, 2006, and withdrew from the race on April 12, before becoming an official candidate, citing health reasons. On October 20, he endorsed Bob Rae.

== Unaffiliated caucus members ==
9 MPs and 6 Senators declared themselves neutral in the race, while 1 of 102 MPs and 10 of 63 Senators have not made their affiliations known or remain undecided.

== Party biennial ==
The first three days of the convention, November 29 to December 1, constituted the biennial convention of the Liberal Party of Canada. As such, delegates cast their ballot for party executive positions as well as the new leader. They also engaged in plenary workshops and other meetings associated with biennial conventions.

The keynote speech at the opening was delivered by Howard Dean, chairman of the U.S. Democratic National Committee, on the topic of party renewal.

A number of new party executives were elected at the convention. Notably, Senator Marie Poulin was elected president defeating Bobbi Ethier and former MP Tony Ianno. Executive members elected at the Convention serve until the next biennial convention.

== Results ==
=== Pre-convention estimated delegate totals ===
2006 Liberal Party of Canada leadership contest - pre-convention strength Withdrew prior to ballot Eliminated
Candidate	Delegates elected			Ex officio delegates			All delegates			First ballot Results				
Candidate	Dels.	%		Dels.	%		Dels.	%				Δ	Δ %	
Candidate	Dels.	of all	pledged	Dels.	of all	pledged	Dels.	of all	pledged	Votes	%	pledged	all	pledged
Michael Ignatieff	1,377	29.32	30.03	230	20.81	35.44	1,607	27.70	30.70	1,412	29.33	▼195	▲1.63	▼1.38
Bob Rae	943	20.08	20.57	86	7.78	13.25	1,029	17.74	19.66	977	20.29	▼52	▲2.56	▲0.63
Stéphane Dion	754	16.05	16.44	129	11.67	19.88	883	15.22	16.87	856	17.78	▼27	▲2.56	▲0.91
Gerard Kennedy	820	17.46	17.88	111	10.05	17.10	931	16.05	17.79	854	17.74	▼77	▲1.69	▼0.05
Ken Dryden	238	5.07	5.19	46	4.16	7.09	284	4.89	5.43	238	4.94	▼46	▲0.05	▼0.48
Scott Brison	226	4.81	4.93	7	0.63	1.08	233	4.02	4.45	192	3.99	▼41	▼0.03	▼0.46
Joe Volpe	181	3.85	3.95	35	3.17	5.39	216	3.72	4.13	156	3.24	▼60	▼0.48	▼0.89
Martha Hall Findlay	46	0.98	1.00	5	0.45	0.77	51	0.88	0.97	130	2.70	▲79	▲1.82	▲1.73
Independent delegates / Undeclared ex officio	112	2.38		456	41.27		568	9.79						
Total pledged / secured delegates	4,585	97.61		649	58.73		5,234	90.21						
Grand Total	4,697			1105			5,802			4,690				

Δ Denotes changes from results of delegate selection meetings.

The significant gaps between the number of pledged delegates each candidate supposedly had and their first ballot performance can largely be attributed to delegate positions "won" by the campaign following voting in local ridings, but were never able to fill with a real person, or were unable to deliver an actual elected delegate to the convention.

- A leadership campaign that had less prospective delegate nominated than delegate positions won may appoint "backfill" delegates, but were limited to two such appointment in any given association. A gap of three or more in any electoral district would result in the campaign being under represented. The most extreme underrepresentation occurred in the electoral district association of Abitibi—Baie-James—Nunavik—Eeyou, where only two mail-in ballots were received, both for Bob Rae. Having won 100% of the votes in that electoral district, Rae was notionally awarded all 14 delegate positions. But in reality, his campaign only nominated six nominees, five of them resident of the Cree community Chisasibi who did not attend the convention. Ignatieff and Rae both secure numerous prominent endorsements from aboriginal leaders and won the lion share of the delegates allocated to the aboriginal commission but was unable to identify enough rank and files aboriginal party members to fill the positions at the convention.
- The campaigns were only able to appoint backfill delegates to positions that were empty. An elected delegate may only be replaced by an alternate delegate. If a campaign ran out of alternates in a particular electoral district, it effectively lost the delegate position if the delegate were unable or unwilling to attend the convention. Many youth delegates were left unfilled for this reason.

=== Convention balloting ===
2006 Liberal Party of Canada leadership contest - convention ballot results Withdrew prior to ballot Eliminated
Candidate	Elected		1st ballot		2nd ballot		3rd ballot		4th ballot	
Candidate	Dels.	%	Votes	%	Votes	%	Votes	%	Votes	%
Michael Ignatieff	1,377	29.32	1412 ▲35	29.33 ▲0.01	1,481 ▲69	31.58 ▲2.25	1660 ▲179	34.46 ▲2.88	2084 ▲424	45.26 ▲10.79
Bob Rae	943	20.08	977 ▲34	20.29 ▲0.21	1,132 ▲155	24.14 ▲3.85	1375 ▲243	28.54 ▲4.41	Did not endorse	
Stéphane Dion	754	16.05	856 ▲102	17.78 ▲1.72	974 ▲118	20.77 ▲2.99	1782 ▲808	36.99 ▲16.23	2521 ▲739	54.74 ▲17.75
Gerard Kennedy	820	17.46	854 ▲34	17.74 ▲0.28	884 ▲30	18.85 ▲1.11	Endorsed Dion			
Ken Dryden	238	5.07	238; 0	4.94 ▼0.12	219 ▼19	4.67 ▼0.27	Endorsed Rae			
Scott Brison	226	4.81	192 ▼34	3.99 ▼0.82	Endorsed Rae				then Ignatieff	
Joe Volpe	181	3.85	156 ▼25	3.24 ▼0.61	Endorsed Rae					
Martha Hall Findlay	46	0.98	130 ▲84	2.70 ▲1.72	Endorsed Dion					
Independent	112	2.38	Unbounded		351		1,230		1,163	
Total	4,697		4,815		4,690 ▼125		4,817 ▲127		4,605 ▼212	

	1st	2nd	3rd	final
Michael Ignatieff	29.33%	31.58%	34.46%	45.26%
Bob Rae	20.29%	24.14%	28.54%	—
Stéphane Dion	17.78%	20.77%	36.99%	54.74%
Gerard Kennedy	17.74%	18.85%	—	—
Ken Dryden	4.94%	4.67%	—	—
Scott Brison	3.99%	—	—	—
Joe Volpe	3.24%	—	—	—
Martha Hall Findlay	2.70%	—	—	—

==== Movement at convention ====
The 2006 Liberal Party of Canada convention opened at Montreal's Palais des congrès on Wednesday November 29, with convention program typical of a party convention in the first two days. As of Friday (December 1) afternoon, 4,942 voting delegates were officially accredited.

The candidate speeches and the first ballot took place on Friday. For the close to 4,000 elected delegates, their first ballots were pre-marked. About 900 ex officio delegates and independent delegates were given a real ballot. The first ballot results were therefore largely predetermined. The despite much jockeying for the "free agent" ex officio delegates, the two front runner posted 1st ballot results identical to their respective share of elected pledged delegates. Stephane Dion, who entered the convention in fourth place, squeezed past Gerard Kennedy by two votes for third place. What was less commented about at the time was that Dion was the only candidate, other than last place finisher Martha Hall Findlay, that overperformed in any meaningful way when compared to their share of the pledged delegates.

First ballot
Ignatieff	29.33%
Rae	20.29%
Dion	17.78%
Kennedy	17.73%
Dryden	4.94%
Brison	3.99%
Volpe	3.24%
Findlay	2.70%

- Hall Findlay as the last place candidate was eliminated, and moved her support to Dion, but she has otherwise released all of her delegates.
- Volpe moved his support to Rae on the evening of December 1 prior to the announcement of the first ballot's results and withdrew from second ballot regardless of the outcome of the first.
- Scott Brison withdrew from the contest after the results were announced and moved his support to Rae

Second ballot
Candidate	Delegate support	Percentage	+/- pp
Michael Ignatieff	1,481	31.6%	+2.3
Bob Rae	1,132	24.1%	+3.8
Stéphane Dion	974	20.8%	+3.1
Gerard Kennedy	884	18.8%	+1.1
Ken Dryden	219	4.7%	-0.2
Total	4,690	100.0%	

Note: There were five spoiled ballots.

Movement:

- Ken Dryden is eliminated as he has the lowest vote total of any candidate. Dryden has moved his personal support to Rae, but he has otherwise released all of his delegates.
- Gerard Kennedy withdrew and moved his support to Stéphane Dion.

Second ballot
Ignatieff	31.58%
Rae	24.14%
Dion	20.77%
Kennedy	18.85%
Dryden	4.67%

Third ballot
Candidate	Delegate support	Percentage	+/-pp
Stéphane Dion	1,782	37.0%	+16.2
Michael Ignatieff	1,660	34.5%	+2.9
Bob Rae	1,375	28.5%	+4.4
Total	4,817	100.0%	

Note: There were six spoiled ballots.

Movement:

- Bob Rae is eliminated as he has the lowest vote total of any candidate. Rae has dispersed his delegates letting them vote for whichever candidate they feel is the best choice. Rae has said he will not state who he voted for.
- Scott Brison who supported Bob Rae after he withdrew throws his support to Michael Ignatieff.
- Ken Dryden, who supported Rae after being eliminated on the second ballot threw his support Stéphane Dion after Rae was eliminated asserting that "Stéphane Dion is a dog with a bone... an academic" and "has a greater chance of winning" the next election.
- Joe Volpe who supported Bob Rae after the first ballot throws his support to Dion.

Third ballot
Dion	36.99%
Ignatieff	34.46%
Rae	28.54%

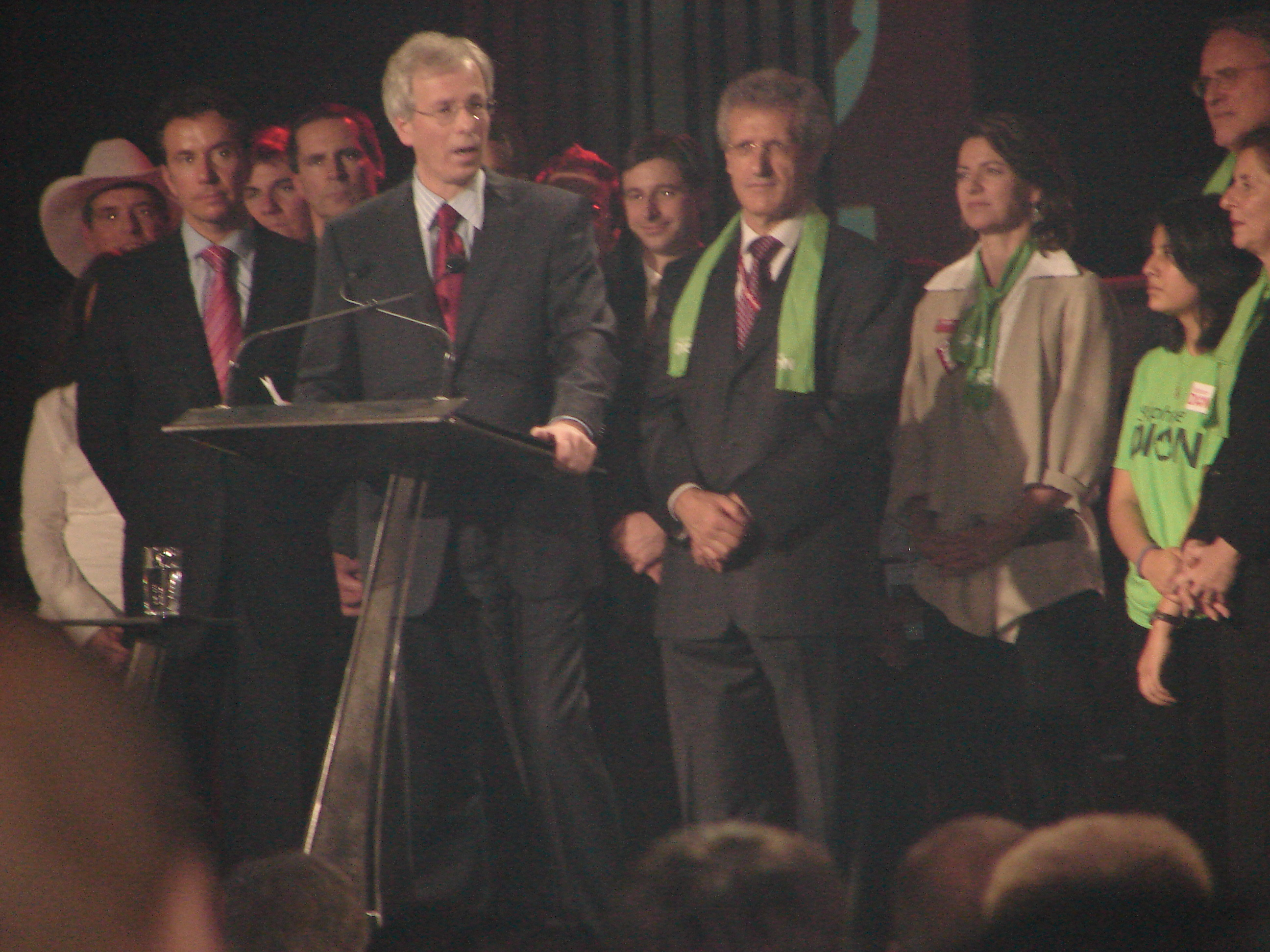
Stéphane Dion, making his acceptance speech after winning the party leadership. Visible behind him are Scott Brison, Joe Volpe, Martha Hall Findlay, and Ken Dryden.

Fourth ballot
Candidate	Delegate support	Percentage	+/-pp
Stéphane Dion	2,521	54.7%	+17.7
Michael Ignatieff	2,084	45.3%	+10.8
Total	4,605	100.0%	

Note: There were 20 spoiled ballots.

- Stéphane Dion wins the 2006 Liberal Leadership race.

Fourth ballot
Dion	54.74%
Ignatieff	45.26%

== Timeline ==
- January 23, 2006 - As returns indicate that the Liberals had lost the 2006 federal election to Stephen Harper's Conservatives, Prime Minister Paul Martin concedes the election and announces his intention to resign as Liberal party leader. In his concession speech, held in the early hours of the morning (EST), he states: "I will continue to represent with pride the people of LaSalle—Émard, but I will not take our party into another election as leader".
- January 25, 2006:
  - Former deputy prime minister of Canada John Manley informs the media that he will not seek the party leadership, stating "While I hope to play a role in the renewal, healing and unification of the Liberal party, I have decided for personal reasons that I will not be a leadership candidate." On election night Manley appeared on CBC television's coverage of the election, and immediately after Prime Minister Paul Martin's announcement was asked whether he might seek the leadership of the Liberal Party of Canada. Manley's response at that time was to poke fun at himself saying: "Some may want a dynamic, charismatic leader. Some others may support me."
  - Former premier of New Brunswick Frank McKenna announces his resignation as Canada's ambassador to the United States. Although submitted in the context of giving Harper the opportunity to appoint an Ambassador who will support Harper's vision of U.S. - Canada relations, it was widely speculated that he was lining up for a run at the federal Liberal leadership.
- January 30, 2006 - Surprising many pundits, Frank McKenna announces he will not run for the leadership. Prior to this, McKenna had been tipped and widely reported as the race's frontrunner. While recognizing the significance of the leadership McKenna acknowledged: "You've got pretty good odds of being the prime minister if you're leader of the Liberal party." However, he put an end to his association with the 2006 Liberal Party leadership race, explaining that he did not want "his life to become consumed by politics." as he had allowed it to become when he was premier of New Brunswick. He also said his decision was in part because: "I reminded myself of my vow upon leaving office that, having escaped the trap, I wouldn't go back for the cheese."
- January 31, 2006 - Brian Tobin announces he will not seek the leadership of the Liberal Party of Canada. Mr. Tobin rationalized his stepping out of the running as an opportunity for the Liberal Party to heal, revitalize and rejuvenate itself. In his words: "... I think it's time for new blood and I think it's time for new players and I think this is an opportunity for the Liberal party to renew itself and, in the process, to heal itself a little bit as well." and that: "I think that I've had my opportunity and I made my contribution. I enjoyed it enormously."
- February 1, 2006 - Prime Minister Martin announces that he will remain leader of the Liberal Party until his successor is chosen but will not take on the position of leader of the opposition, allowing caucus to choose a parliamentary leader. Later that day the Liberal caucus chooses Bill Graham for that position, and Lucienne Robillard is named as his deputy. Martin subsequently moved up the date his resignation became effective to March 18, 2006.
- February 3, 2006 - Both Lloyd Axworthy and Allan Rock announce they will not run for the leadership of the Liberal party.
- February 6, 2006 - Martin resigns as prime minister, succeeded by Conservative Leader Stephen Harper.
- February 8, 2006 - Martha Hall Findlay becomes first to declare candidacy for the leadership.
- March 1, 2006 - The Toronto Star reports that Gerard Kennedy is seriously considering a leadership bid and that he is backed by Senator Terry Mercer, former national director of the Liberal Party of Canada.
- March 9, 2006 - Scott Brison is revealed to have sent an email to an investment banker in November 2005 prior to the Martin government's change of policy on income trusts. It is also revealed that the RCMP had interviewed Brison as part of its investigation on an alleged leak of information on the policy shift and related claims of "insider trading". Though Brison insists he was only passing on public information, his judgement in the matter has raised questions about his suitability as a candidate for the party's leadership.
- March 13, 2006 - Bob Rae gives a speech to the Canadian Club in Winnipeg outlining his views of the problems facing the country. He says he'll make up his mind on whether he'll run for the Liberal leadership in the next few days.
- March 14, 2006 - Mark Marissen, Martin's chief organizer in British Columbia, reportedly commits to manage the Dion leadership campaign. This likely confirms Marissen's wife Christy Clark is not considering a run at the leadership herself.
- March 18, 2006:
  - The federal Liberal Party's national executive holds the first of two days of meetings to decide on the date of the leadership convention as well as the preliminary rules for the contest.
  - Paul Martin formally resigns as leader and Bill Graham is appointed interim leader of the party until the convention.
- March 19, 2006:
  - Convention rules and spending limits are finalized.
  - A press conference is held at 3 p.m., during which the date and location of the convention, the entrance fee for candidates, spending limits and other details of the process for selecting the new leader are announced.
  - Don Valley West MP John Godfrey becomes the second declared candidate for the leadership. "I intend to run [...] I just don't think this thing, in the end, is going to be won by money."
- March 20, 2006 - Musician Ashley MacIsaac declares himself a candidate for the leadership; his announcement is widely characterized in the media as a publicity stunt to promote his new album. However, MacIsaac never formally files his registration as a candidate, and announces in June that he is abandoning his campaign, officially citing his lack of ability to speak French.
- March 23, 2006 - At the King Edward Hotel in Toronto, Paul Zed and Dennis Mills host a cocktail reception honouring Sheila Copps for thirty years in public life. The event is attended by virtually every declared or rumoured leadership hopeful, and is viewed by most as the public launch of the leadership race.
- March 29, 2006 - Vaughan MP Maurizio Bevliacqua confirms in a television interview that he will likely be a candidate.
- April 5, 2006
  - Gerard Kennedy resigns from the Ontario cabinet clearing the way for him to enter the federal leadership contest.
  - According to the Globe & Mail, Bob Rae has submitted his application to join the Liberal Party.
- April 6, 2006 - Belinda Stronach announced she wouldn't join the race citing the way the contest is structured. Sources close to Stronach also cite her lack of French as a factor.
- April 7, 2006
  - The leadership campaign formally starts on this date, the first in which candidates can officially register and the date from which time window for the selection of delegates and party membership is counted.
  - Stéphane Dion joined the race. His stated priorities include economic and social development, environmental sustainability and a better public health services.
  - Michael Ignatieff officially declares his candidacy.
- April 8, 2006 - The Alberta wing of the Liberal Party holds its annual convention in Edmonton. A "leadership panel" is organized which is billed as the first opportunity for declared and prospective candidates to appear and "debate" each other. Declared candidates Clifford Blais, Stéphane Dion, John Godfrey, Martha Hall Findlay, Michael Ignatieff, and Gerard Kennedy, participate along with undeclared candidates Maurizio Bevilacqua, Carolyn Bennett, Scott Brison, Ruby Dhalla, Joe Fontana, Hedy Fry, John McCallum, Bob Rae, Joe Volpe, and Paul Zed. Denis Coderre was absent due to a prior commitment. Ken Dryden could not attend due to a family wedding.
- April 12, 2006 - John Godfrey withdraws from the race, citing concerns about his health.
- April 19, 2006 - Greater Toronto Area MP Maurizio Bevilacqua officially enters the race.
- April 21, 2006 - Toronto MP Joe Volpe enters race.
- April 23, 2006 - Nova Scotia MP Scott Brison enters the race.
- April 24, 2006 - Former Ontario Premier Bob Rae and Toronto MP Carolyn Bennett formally declare their candidacies.
- April 27, 2006 - Toronto MPP Gerard Kennedy enters the race.
- April 28, 2006 - Toronto MP Ken Dryden launches his campaign.
- May 4, 2006 - Hedy Fry announces her leadership bid.
- June 1, 2006 - Following demands for an investigation and accusations that he had violated the Elections Act, Joe Volpe gives back $27,000 in donations given by the children of Apotex corporate executives who had exceeded the legal limit for their own individual donations.
- June 10, 2006 - The first formal leadership debate of the campaign occurred in Winnipeg.
- June 17, 2006 - Moncton hosted the campaign's second formal debate.
- July 4, 2006 - Deadline for anyone wishing to vote in the leadership election to take out party membership if they are not a member already or if they are a former member whose membership has lapsed. Those who were formerly "Life members" (a defunct category in Newfoundland and New Brunswick) have until the end of September to renew.
- July 13, 2006 - The Toronto Star reports that Gerard Kennedy appears to have signed up more new members than any other candidate. The article says that it had been "conventional wisdom" that Michael Ignatieff and Bob Rae were the leaders in the race but "(t)hese numbers would indicate a change in the dynamic of the race".
- July 26, 2006 - Jim Karygiannis resigned as national chair of Joe Volpe's campaign due to disagreements over Volpe's position on the war in Lebanon.
- August 14, 2006 - Maurizio Bevilacqua becomes the first official candidate to drop out of the race. He throws his support to Bob Rae.
- August 21–24, 2006 - Vancouver - National Liberal Caucus meets in Vancouver, BC
- August 22, 2006 - Liberal Women's Caucus Leadership Forum in Vancouver.
- September 10, 2006 - Quebec leadership and policy forum in Quebec City.
- September 15, 2006 - Carolyn Bennett withdraws from the race and endorses Bob Rae.
- September 17, 2006 - British Columbia leadership and policy forum in Vancouver.
- September 25, 2006 - Hedy Fry withdraws and endorses Bob Rae.
- September 29 - October 1, 2006 - "Super Weekend" during which all riding associations and party clubs elect delegates to the convention.
- September 30, 2006 - Deadline for candidates to formally register.
- October 10, 2006 - A debate for the "frontrunners" is hosted jointly by the Canadian Club of Toronto and the Empire Club of Canada. It is a tradition, according to the clubs, that dates back 100 years to invite the frontrunning candidates in Toronto mayoral elections as well as Ontario and federal leadership campaigns. Messrs. Ignatieff, Rae, Kennedy and Dion were invited but Mr. Ignatieff declined to attend. Mr. Ignatieff said he would not attend unless all eight candidates were allowed to participate though the clubs said he also offered to come and speak individually without other candidates present.
- October 15, 2006 - Toronto leadership and policy forum.

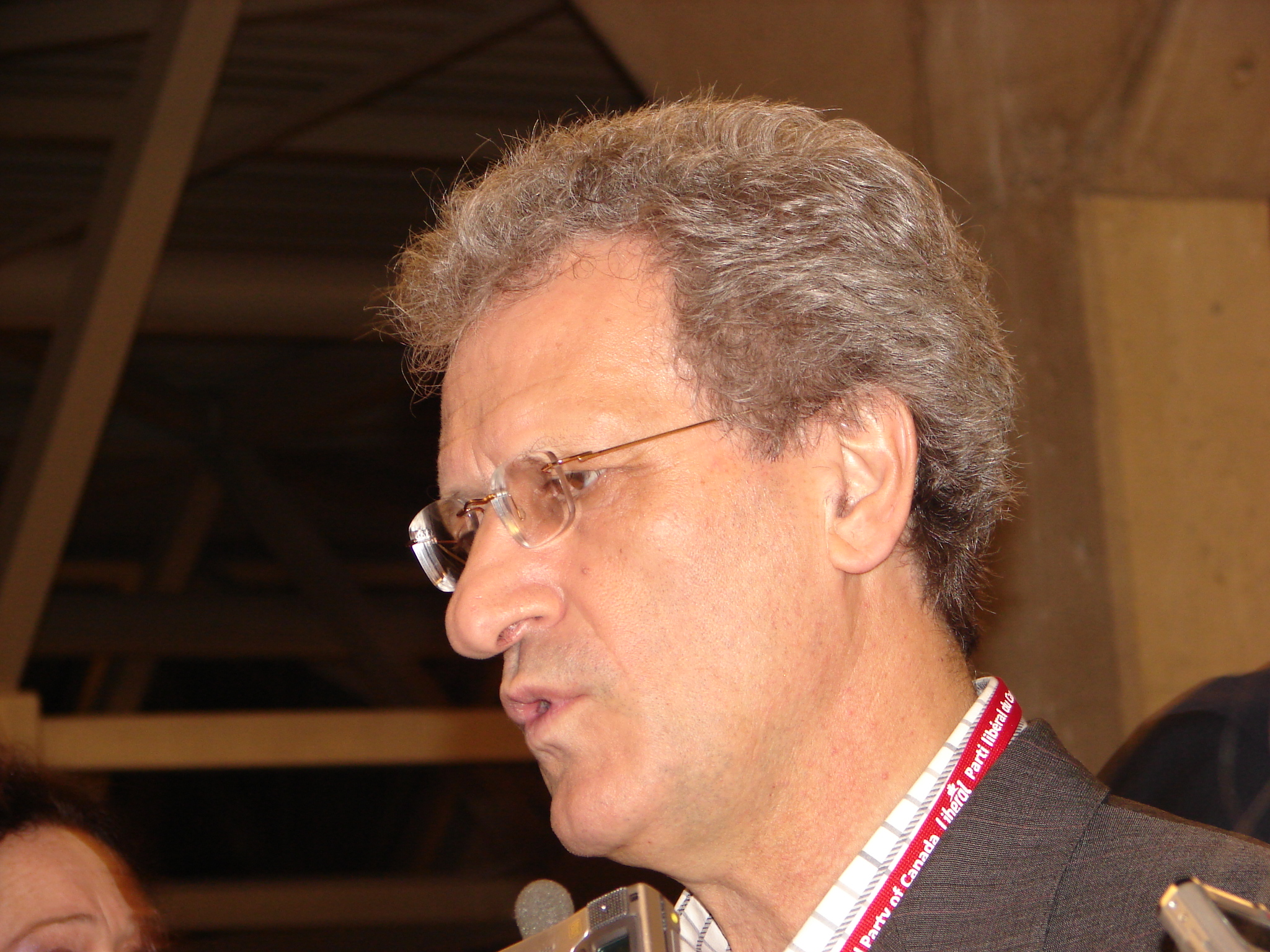
Joe Volpe speaking to the press, announcing his departure from the race

- November 29 - December 1, 2006 - Liberal biennial convention.
- December 1, 2006 - Candidate speeches and first ballot. Joe Volpe dropped out prior to the 1st ballot results were given, endorses Bob Rae. And after Rae was eliminated, endorses Stéphane Dion.
- December 2, 2006
  - Martha Hall Findlay arrives last on the 1st ballot, endorses Stéphane Dion.
  - Scott Brison drops out after the 1st ballot, endorses Bob Rae. And after Rae was eliminated, endorses Michael Ignatieff.
  - Ken Dryden arrives last on the 2nd ballot, endorses Bob Rae. And after Rae was eliminated, endorses Stéphane Dion.
  - Gerard Kennedy drops out after the 2nd ballot, endorses Stéphane Dion.
  - Bob Rae arrives last on the 3rd ballot, releases delegates.
  - Stéphane Dion wins the Liberal leadership over Michael Ignatieff on the 4th and final ballot.

== See also ==
- Liberal Party of Canada leadership elections for the results of all past conventions.
- Leadership convention for more information about the selection of party leaders in Canada.
