= Scar tissue =

Scar tissue may refer to:

== Medicine ==
- Scar, an area of fibrous tissue that replaces normal skin after injury
- Granulation tissue, a product of healing in major wounds

== Film and television ==
- Scar Tissue (1975 film), or Wanted: Babysitter, a film by René Clément
- Scar Tissue (2002 film), a television movie starring Roberta Maxwell
- Scar Tissue (2012 film), a film featuring Helen George
- "Scar Tissue" (Dexter), a 2013 TV episode
- "Scar Tissue" (The Punisher), a 2019 TV episode
- "Scar Tissue" (The Shield), a 2003 TV episode

== Literature ==
- Scar Tissue (autobiography), a 2004 autobiography by Anthony Kiedis
- Scar Tissue (novel), a 1993 novel by Michael Ignatieff

== Music ==
- Scar Tissue (band), an American electro-industrial group
- "Scar Tissue", a song by Red Hot Chili Peppers, 1999
- "Scar Tissue", a song by Camila Cabello from Camila, 2018
- "Scar Tissue", a song by Five Finger Death Punch from F8, 2020
