= Yves Morin =

Canadian politician (1929–2024)

The Honourable Yves Morin

Senator for Lauzon, Quebec
- In office 2001–2004
- Appointed by: Jean Chrétien
- Preceded by: Michel Cogger
- Succeeded by: Dennis Dawson

Personal details
- Born: November 28, 1929 Quebec City, Quebec, Canada
- Died: June 4, 2024 (aged 94) Quebec City, Quebec, Canada
- Party: Liberal

Yves Morin, OC OQ (November 28, 1929 – June 4, 2024) was a Canadian cardiologist, physician, scientist, and Senator.

== Biography ==
Born in Quebec City, Quebec, he received a Bachelor of Arts degree in 1948 and a Doctor of Medicine degree in 1953 from the Université Laval.

Morin was Dean of the Faculty of Medicine at Université Laval.

In 2001, he was appointed to the Senate of Canada representing the senatorial division of Lauzon, Quebec. A Liberal, he served until his mandatory retirement on his 75th birthday in 2004.

In 1990, he was made an Officer of the Order of Canada for having "a major influence on the training of a generation of doctors". In 1995, he was made an Officer of the National Order of Quebec.

Morin died in Quebec City on June 4, 2024, at the age of 94.
