= Senate Liberal Caucus =

Canadian parliamentary grouping (2014–19)

Senate Liberal Caucus Caucus libéral du Sénat
- Founded: 29 January 2014
- Dissolved: 14 November 2019
- Split from: Liberal Party of Canada
- Succeeded by: Progressive Senate Group
- Ideology: Liberalism
- Political position: Centre to centre-left
- Colours: Red

Website
- liberalsenateforum.ca (archived - October 30, 2015)

The Senate Liberal Caucus (French: Caucus libéral du Sénat), also known as the Senate Liberals (French: libéraux au Sénat), was a parliamentary grouping in the Senate of Canada from 2014 to 2019. It consisted of independent senators who were individually members of the Liberal Party of Canada and were appointed on the advice of previous Liberal prime ministers. The caucus was not formally affiliated to or recognized by the Liberal Party.

The caucus was dissolved on November 14, 2019, and its members formed a new non-partisan parliamentary group, the Progressive Senate Group. The dissolution of the Senate Liberals marked the first time the Senate of Canada had no Liberal members since Canadian Confederation in 1867.

== History ==
Historically, Liberal senators were part of the national Liberal Party parliamentary caucus, alongside MPs; this changed on January 29, 2014, when party leader Justin Trudeau expelled all 32 senators from the caucus. The expulsion came as part of Trudeau's proposal for a non-partisan Senate, arguing that "the party structure within the Senate interferes with [their] responsibilities," and said the remaining Liberal senators would have no formal ties to the Liberal Party machinery. The move came as a surprise to the Liberal senators, who were not informed the decision ahead of time. Although Trudeau said that they would now sit as independents, the 32 senators chose to keep the designation "Liberal" and continue to sit together as a caucus, formally called the "Senate Liberal Caucus". Jim Cowan, the former leader of the Liberal Party in the Senate, remained the leader of his Liberal colleagues, and continued to be recognized as the Leader of the Opposition in the Senate. According to Cowan, the only change would be that they "will not need to be concerned any more about the real or perceived direction from the national Liberal caucus."

Unlike previous practice in which the Liberal leaders in the Senate were appointed by the leader of the Liberal Party of Canada, the leader of the Senate Liberal Caucus was directly elected by Liberal senators. When the Liberal Party under Trudeau formed the government following the 2015 federal election, contrary to previous practice, the Senate Liberals did not become the government caucus in the Senate. Instead, Trudeau appointed a non-affiliated senator to be the Representative of the Government in the Senate. After 2015, several senators left the caucus and redesignated themselves as non-affiliated senators or joined the Independent Senators Group.

By 2019, redesignations and retirements had reduced the Senate Liberal Caucus to nine members. As a minimum of nine members is required for official caucus status, which entitles the grouping to access to funding for a research budget and other supports and privileges, the Senate Liberals were expected to lose their status as an official Senate caucus on January 24, 2020, when the mandatory retirement of Senator Joseph A. Day would have reduced the caucus to eight. Additionally, senators Serge Joyal and Lillian Dyck were set to retire from the Senate on February 1, 2020, and August 24, 2020, respectively, which meant that the parliamentary group would have been further reduced to six senators. (Note: Unofficial parliamentary groups in the Senate of Canada are not given official status for the purpose of styling the group affiliation of one or more Senators. Thus, Senators arranging themselves in an unofficial parliamentary group would be officially listed as non-affiliated Senators.)

On November 14, 2019, Day announced that the Senate Liberal Caucus was disbanding, with its current complement of nine members forming a new non-partisan parliamentary group called the Progressive Senate Group (PSG). Day said the PSG had "no ties at all" to the Liberal Party, and hoped that other senators would be more likely to join their caucus after dropping the Liberal name. With the dissolution of the Senate Liberal Caucus, the Senate was without any Liberal senators for the first time in its history.

== Leaders of the Senate Liberal Caucus ==
Name	Prov.	Term start	Term end
Jim Cowan	Nova Scotia	January 29, 2014	June 15, 2016
Joseph A. Day	New Brunswick	June 15, 2016	November 14, 2019

== Membership ==
=== Members at dissolution ===
Name	Province (Division)	Mandatory retirement date
Jane Cordy	Nova Scotia	2 July 2025
Dennis Dawson	Quebec (Lauzon)	28 September 2024
Joseph A. Day	New Brunswick (Saint John-Kennebecasis)	24 January 2020
Percy Downe	Prince Edward Island (Charlottetown)	8 July 2029
Lillian Dyck	Saskatchewan (North Battleford)	24 August 2020
Serge Joyal	Quebec (Kennebec)	1 February 2020
Terry Mercer (Note: Was the chairman of the caucus at dissolution)	Nova Scotia (Northend Halifax)	6 May 2022
Jim Munson	Ontario (Ottawa/Rideau Canal)	14 July 2021
Sandra Lovelace Nicholas	New Brunswick	15 April 2023

=== Former members ===
Name	Province (Division)	Left caucus	Reason
George Baker	Newfoundland and Labrador	4 September 2017	Retired (mandatory)
Catherine Callbeck	Prince Edward Island	25 July 2014	Retired (mandatory)
Larry Campbell	British Columbia	6 April 2016	Joined Independent Senators Group
Maria Chaput	Manitoba	1 March 2016	Retired
Marie Charette-Poulin	Ontario (Northern Ontario)	17 April 2015	Retired
Jim Cowan	Nova Scotia	22 January 2017	Retired (mandatory)
Roméo Dallaire	Quebec (Gulf)	17 June 2014	Retired
Art Eggleton	Ontario (Toronto)	29 September 2018	Retired (mandatory)
Joan Fraser	Quebec (De Lorimier)	2 February 2018	Retired
George Furey	Newfoundland and Labrador	3 December 2015	Left to sit as non-affiliated
Céline Hervieux-Payette	Quebec (Bedford)	22 April 2018	Retired (mandatory)
Libbe Hubley	Prince Edward Island	8 September 2017	Retired (mandatory)
Mobina Jaffer	British Columbia	20 December 2018	Left to sit as non-affiliated
Paul Massicotte	Quebec (De Lanaudière)	30 October 2017	Joined Independent Senators Group
Pana Merchant	Saskatchewan	31 March 2017	Retired
Grant Mitchell	Alberta	2 May 2016	Left to sit as non-affiliated
Wilfred Moore	Nova Scotia (Stanhope Street-South Shore)	14 January 2017	Retired (mandatory)
Pierrette Ringuette	New Brunswick	2 February 2016	Joined Independent Senators Group
Fernand Robichaud	New Brunswick	2 December 2014	Retired (mandatory)
Nick Sibbeston	Northwest Territories	5 May 2016	Left to sit as non-affiliated
David Smith	Ontario (Cobourg)	16 May 2016	Retired (mandatory)
Claudette Tardif	Alberta	2 February 2018	Retired
Charlie Watt	Quebec (Inkerman)	16 March 2018	Retired

== See also ==
- Canadian Senators Group
- Independent Senators Group
- Progressive Senate Group
