= Jim Munson =

Canadian politician and journalist

The Honourable Jim Munson
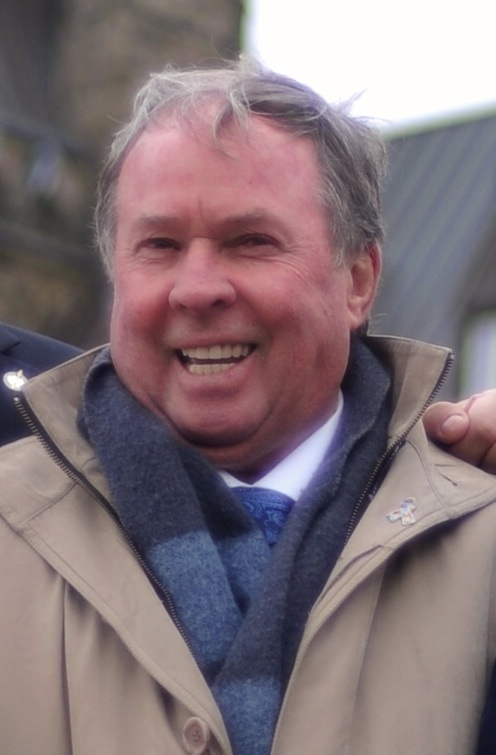

Canadian Senator from Ontario
- In office December 10, 2003 – July 14, 2021
- Nominated by: Jean Chrétien
- Appointed by: Adrienne Clarkson
- Succeeded by: Ian Shugart

Personal details
- Born: July 14, 1946 (age 80) Woodstock, New Brunswick, Canada
- Party: Liberal (until 2014); Independent Liberal (2014-2019); Progressive Senate Group (2019-2021)

Jim Munson (born July 14, 1946) is a former Canadian Senator and retired journalist.

== Early life and education ==
Jim Munson was born in Woodstock, New Brunswick, although spent most of his childhood in Campbellton. His father was a minister in the United Church of Canada.

In 1960, his father transferred to St. Lambert United Church in Saint-Lambert, Quebec. As a result, the family relocated to Saint-Lambert where Munson attended Chambly County High School, graduating in 1963.

== Journalism career ==
Munson began his career in 1965 as a disc jockey with CJLS-FM in Yarmouth, Nova Scotia. He spent most of his journalism career with CTV, which he joined in 1979 after working for Broadcast News for several years. He served as the network's correspondent in Ottawa and then London, England. From 1987 to 1992 he was CTV's bureau chief in Beijing and consequently covered the Tiananmen Square protests of 1989. He also covered the Iran–Iraq War and the Gulf War in the course of his career. Munson was let go by CTV in 2001.

== Political career ==
A year later, in August 2002, he took employment with the Prime Minister's Office as Jean Chrétien's director of communications, often acting as the Prime Minister's spokesman. On December 10, 2003, two days before retiring from office, Chrétien appointed Munson to the Senate of Canada where he served as the Whip of the Senate Liberal Caucus from 2008 to 2016.

Munson represents the province of Ontario in the Senate with his official designation including the region known as Ottawa-Rideau Canal.

Munson has not claimed a Senate housing allowance since it started in 2010 to post its expenses on the Internet. His primary residence is in the National Capital Region.

On January 29, 2014, Liberal Party leader Justin Trudeau announced all Liberal Senators, including Munson, were removed from the Liberal caucus, and would continue sitting as Independents. The Senators refer to themselves as the Senate Liberal Caucus even though they are no longer members of the parliamentary Liberal caucus.

With the Senate Liberal Caucus facing losing official parliamentary caucus status in 2020 with a third of its caucus facing mandatory retirements on their turning age 75, Senator Joseph Day announced that the Senate Liberal Caucus had been dissolved and a new Progressive Senate Group formed in its wake, with the entire membership joining the new group, including this senator.

Munson retired from the Senate on July 14, 2021, his 75th birthday.
