= Sandra Lovelace Nicholas =

Canadian politician (born 1948)

The Honourable Sandra Lovelace Nicholas CM

Canadian Senator from New Brunswick
- In office September 21, 2005 – January 31, 2023
- Nominated by: Paul Martin
- Appointed by: Adrienne Clarkson

Personal details
- Born: Mary Sandra Nicholas; April 15, 1948 (age 78)
- Party: Progressive Senate Group (since 2019)
- Other political affiliations: Senate Liberal (2014–2019); Liberal (until 2014)
- Spouse: Bennie Lovelace (divorced)

Mary Sandra Lovelace Nicholas CM (born April 15, 1948) is a former Canadian senator representing New Brunswick. Sitting with the Progressive Senate Group, she was the first Indigenous woman appointed to the Senate from Atlantic Canada. As an activist on behalf of First Nations women and children, she received international recognition in 1979 for bringing her case to the United Nations Human Rights Committee. In 1985 she succeeded in having Parliament revoke a discriminatory section of the Indian Act, which had caused women marrying non-Aboriginals to lose status and also deprived their children of status but did not treat men the same who married non-Aboriginal women.

== Early life and education ==
Mary Sandra Nicholas was born a Maliseet in the Tobique First Nation. She studied at St. Thomas University and also obtained a degree in residential construction from the Northern Technical College in Maine, while living in the United States. As a young woman, she became an activist for aboriginal rights and has also worked as a carpenter.

== Marriage and family ==
In 1970 Nicholas married Bennie Lovelace, a non-Aboriginal, and had one child with him. After they divorced, she moved back to her reserve but found that she and her children were deprived of status rights because of her marriage. This affected her family's housing, health, and education for her children. It took her nearly a decade to reclaim her First Nations status, leading to her work as an activist on this and related issues for women and children's rights.

== Career ==
The Native women's groups, Indian Rights for Indian Women and National Native Women's Association, had been involved in trying to right the inequity of provisions under the Indian Act that deprived First Nations women and their children from status by marriage to a non-Aboriginal. Men who married non-status women did not suffer the same loss of status. In 1974, the Supreme Court of Canada upheld the law. Changes to the law were opposed by some male-dominated First Nations.

After being divorced from a non-Aboriginal man and returning to the Tobique reserve, Lovelace Nicholas found she and her children had lost their status as First Nations people, depriving them of rights to housing, education, and healthcare for a decade. In July 1977 she joined with other women on a 100-mile walk to Ottawa to bring attention to the issue.

Lovelace Nicholas became known internationally as an activist when, in 1979, she petitioned the United Nations over the treatment of aboriginal women and children in Canada by the government, in the case known as Sandra Lovelace v. Canada (1977–1981). Among the policies she criticized was revoking the status of a First Nations woman if she married a non-aboriginal man, and denying status to their children. As noted, this had numerous effect, including denying such women equal access to reserve land. It imposed a patriarchal model of identity, depriving married women of their independent rights and status. In addition, as many of the First Nations had matrilineal systems, in which children belonged to the mother's people, the law deprived the children of such marriages of their traditional First Nations identity.

In 1985, Lovelace Nicholas was finally successful in her campaign to have the law changed. Parliament passed an amendment to have a 116-year-old section of the Indian Act removed that revoked an aboriginal woman's Indian status if she married a non-Aboriginal man. This protected the status of First Nations women and their children, and was important in preserving the culture of descendants who identified as Aboriginal.

In 2005 Lovelace Nicholas was the first Aboriginal woman appointed to the Senate, where she sat as a Liberal.

On January 29, 2014, Liberal Party leader Justin Trudeau announced all Liberal Senators, including Lovelace Nicholas, were removed from the Liberal caucus, and would continue sitting as Independents. The Senators refer to themselves as the Senate Liberal Caucus even though they are no longer members of the parliamentary Liberal caucus.

In April 2018 the Feminist Alliance for International Action recognized Sandra as a member of the Indigenous Famous Six. Other members are Jeannette Corbiere-Lavell, Yvonne Bedard, Sharon McIvor, Lynn Gehl, and Senator Lillian Eva Dyck.

With the Senate Liberal Caucus facing losing official parliamentary caucus status in 2020 with a third of its caucus facing mandatory retirements on their turning age 75, Senator Joseph Day announced that the Senate Liberal Caucus had been dissolved and a new Progressive Senate Group formed in its wake, with the entire membership joining the new group, including this senator.

On January 31, 2023, Lovelace Nicholas retired from the Senate.

== Legacy and honors ==
- 1990, Lovelace Nicholas was made a Member of the Order of Canada.
- 1992, she received one of the annual five Governor General's Awards in Commemoration of the Persons Case, recognizing women's achievements.
- 2005, she was appointed a senator from New Brunswick by Prime Minister Paul Martin.
- 2008, she was awarded an honorary degree by St. Francis Xavier University.
