= Jane Cordy =

Canadian senator (born 1950)

The Honourable Jane Cordy
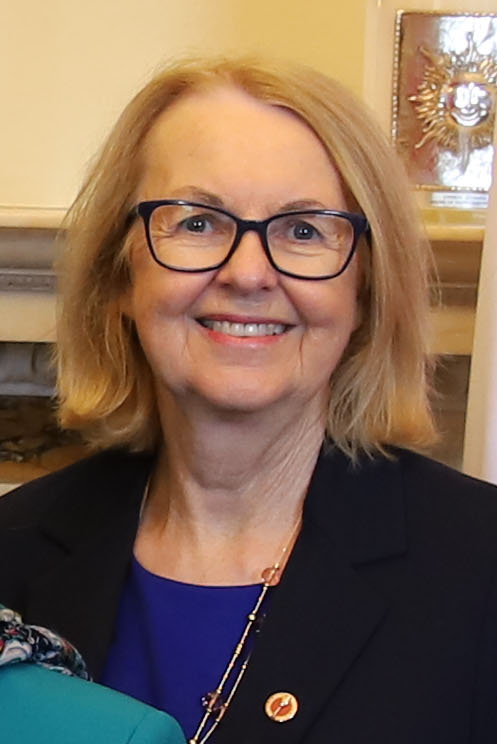

Leader of the Progressive Senate Group
- In office December 12, 2019 – February 27, 2024
- Deputy: Pierre Dalphond
- Preceded by: Joseph Day
- Succeeded by: Pierre Dalphond

Canadian Senator from Nova Scotia
- In office June 9, 2000 – November 18, 2024
- Nominated by: Jean Chrétien
- Appointed by: Adrienne Clarkson

Personal details
- Born: July 2, 1950 (age 75) Sydney, Nova Scotia, Canada
- Party: Liberal (until 2014); Senate Liberal Caucus (2014–2019); Progressive Senate Group (2019–2024)

Jane Marie Cordy (born July 2, 1950) is a former Canadian Senator who represented Nova Scotia from 2000 to 2024.

== Early life ==
Born in Sydney, Nova Scotia, she received a teaching certificate from the Nova Scotia Teachers College and a Bachelor of Education from Mount Saint Vincent University. A teacher, she taught for the Sydney School Board, the Halifax County School Board, the New Glasgow School Board, and the Halifax Regional School Board.

== Appointment to the Senate ==
Cordy was appointed to the Senate by Prime Minister Jean Chrétien on June 9, 2000. She has also served as Vice-Chair of the Halifax-Dartmouth Port Development Commission and as Chair of the Board of Referees for the Halifax Region of Human Resources Development Canada.

She sat in the Senate as a Liberal representing the senatorial division of Nova Scotia.

On January 29, 2014, Liberal Party leader Justin Trudeau announced all Liberal Senators, including Cordy, were removed from the Liberal caucus, and would continue sitting as independents. The Senators referred to themselves as the Senate Liberal Caucus even though they were no longer members of the parliamentary Liberal caucus.

With the Senate Liberal Caucus facing losing official parliamentary caucus status in 2020 with a third of its caucus facing mandatory retirements on their turning age 75, Senator Joseph Day announced that the Senate Liberal Caucus had been dissolved and a new Progressive Senate Group (PSG) formed in its wake, with the entire membership joining the new group, including this senator.

With Day's mandatory retirement in January 2020, on December 12, 2019, Cordy tweeted that her colleagues in the PSG had selected her as the new leader, ostensibly effective that same date. Additionally, she subsequently announced later that day Senator Terry Mercer would be moving into the Whip/Caucus Chair role, that Senator Dennis Dawson would become the new Deputy Leader, and that the interim monikers were being removed at the same time.

Following the retirement of George Furey on May 12, 2023, she became the longest-serving member of the Senate. On November 18, 2024, she retired, eight months early of her mandatory retirement date.
