= Claudette Tardif =

Canadian politician

The Honourable Claudette Tardif CM AOE

Canadian Senator from Alberta
- In office March 24, 2005 – February 2, 2018
- Nominated by: Paul Martin
- Appointed by: Adrienne Clarkson

Deputy Leader of the Opposition in the Senate
- In office January 18, 2007 – February 2, 2018
- Preceded by: Joan Fraser

Personal details
- Born: July 27, 1947 (age 79) Westlock, Alberta, Canada
- Party: Liberal (until 2014); Independent Liberal (2014-present)

Claudette Tardif CM AOE (born July 27, 1947) is a Canadian retired senator from Edmonton, Alberta. She was appointed to the senate by Governor General Adrienne Clarkson, on the advice of Prime Minister Paul Martin, on March 24, 2005, representing the Liberal Party of Canada.

Prior to entering the Senate she was a professor and dean at the University of Alberta's French-language faculty, Faculté Saint-Jean. At the time of her appointment, Tardif was vice-president of the University of Alberta. Tardif is also a longstanding advocate of minority language rights, particularly for Alberta's francophone minority.

On January 18, 2007, she was named Deputy Leader of the Opposition in the Senate.

On January 29, 2014, Liberal Party leader Justin Trudeau announced all Liberal Senators, including Tardif, were removed from the Liberal caucus, and would continue sitting as Independents. The Senators refer to themselves as the Senate Liberal Caucus even though they are no longer members of the parliamentary Liberal caucus.

Tardif retired from the Senate on February 2, 2018, five years prior to the mandatory retirement age of 75, in order to spend more time with her family.

In 2023, Tardif was appointed a Member of the Alberta Order of Excellence, the province's civilian honour for merit.
