= Terry Mercer =

Canadian politician

The Honourable Terry Mercer

Whip and Caucus Chair of the Progressive Senate Group
- In office December 12, 2019 – May 6, 2022
- Leader: Jane Cordy
- Preceded by: Position established

Interim Deputy Leader of the Progressive Senate Group
- In office November 14, 2019 – December 11, 2019
- Leader: Joseph A. Day Interim
- Preceded by: Position established
- Succeeded by: Dennis Dawson

Canadian Senator from Nova Scotia (North End Halifax)
- In office November 7, 2003 – May 6, 2022
- Nominated by: Jean Chrétien
- Appointed by: Adrienne Clarkson

Personal details
- Born: May 6, 1947 (age 78)
- Party: Liberal (until 2014); Independent Liberal (2014-2019); Progressive Senate Group (2019-present)

Terry M. Mercer (born May 6, 1947) is a former Canadian Senator who represented Nova Scotia from 2003 to 2022.

== Career ==
From 1974 to 1978, Mercer worked as Executive Assistant to Nova Scotia's Minister of Labour and Housing. Mercer then acted as an administrator and fundraiser for numerous charitable organizations such as the Kidney Foundation of Canada, St. John Ambulance, the Nova Scotia Lung Association, the YMCA and the Canadian Diabetes Association and is currently Past Chair of the Association of Fundraising Professionals' Foundation for Philanthropy in Canada.

== As Senator ==
A long-time fundraiser and organizer for the Liberal Party of Canada, Mercer was National Director of the Liberal Party during much of Prime Minister Jean Chrétien's tenure as party leader. Mercer was appointed to the Senate representing Nova Scotia by Chrétien in November 2003, shortly before the Prime Minister's retirement.

In February 2013, Mercer became a subject of criticism for having spent the most out of any senator in the previous year.

On January 29, 2014, Liberal Party leader Justin Trudeau announced all Liberal Senators, including Mercer, were removed from the Liberal caucus, and would sit as independents. The senators referred to themselves as the Senate Liberal Caucus even though they were no longer members of the parliamentary Liberal caucus.

With the Senate Liberal Caucus facing losing official parliamentary caucus status in 2020 with a third of its caucus facing mandatory retirements on their turning age 75, Senator Joseph Day announced that the Senate Liberal Caucus had been dissolved and a new Progressive Senate Group formed in its wake, with the entire membership joining the new group, including Mercer.

With Senator Day's mandatory retirement in January 2020, on December 12, 2019, Senator Jane Cordy tweeted that her colleagues in the PSG had selected her as the new leader, ostensibly effective that same date. Additionally, she subsequently announced later that day Senator Mercer would be moving into the Whip/Caucus Chair role, that Senator Dennis Dawson would become the new Deputy Leader, and that the interim monikers were being removed at the same time. Senator Mercer retired on May 6, 2022, upon reaching the age of 75, as required by the constitution.
