= Jim Cowan =

Canadian politician

The Honourable Jim Cowan CM KC

Canadian Senator from Nova Scotia
- In office March 24, 2005 – January 22, 2017
- Nominated by: Paul Martin
- Appointed by: Adrienne Clarkson

Leader of the Senate Liberal Caucus
- In office January 29, 2014 – June 15, 2016
- Preceded by: Position established
- Succeeded by: Joseph A. Day

Leader of the Opposition in the Senate
- In office November 3, 2008 – November 4, 2015
- Preceded by: Céline Hervieux-Payette
- Succeeded by: Claude Carignan

Personal details
- Born: January 22, 1942 (age 84) Halifax, Nova Scotia, Canada
- Party: Liberal (until 2014); Senate Liberal (2014-present)
- Spouse: Shelagh Cowan
- Relations: Halifax, Nova Scotia
- Children: Robert, David, Peter and Suzanne Cowan
- Education: Dalhousie University (BA, LLB); London School of Economics (LLM)
- Occupation: Lawyer
- Committees: Standing Committee of Selection, Standing Committee on Aboriginal Peoples, Standing Committee on Agriculture and Forestry
- Portfolio: Leader of the Opposition in the Senate

James S. Cowan CM KC (born January 22, 1942) is a Canadian lawyer, a senator from Nova Scotia from 2005 to 2017, and was Leader of the Opposition in the Senate from 2008 to 2015 and leader of the Independent Liberal caucus until June 15, 2016. Cowan was a lawyer and a partner at the legal firm Stewart McKelvey from 1967 until 2020. He retired from the senate on January 22, 2017, having reached the mandatory retirement age for senators.

He was appointed to the Senate on the advice of prime minister Paul Martin on March 24, 2005 as a Liberal Party of Canada Senator. In 2008, he was appointed Leader of the Opposition in the Senate of Canada.

== Education ==
He received a Bachelor of Arts degree and Bachelor of Law degree from Dalhousie University, where he was a member of Phi Delta Theta fraternity. He received his Master of Laws degree in 1966 from the London School of Economics.

== Nova Scotia politics ==
In November 1985, Cowan announced he would seek the leadership of the Nova Scotia Liberal Party, but was defeated by Vince MacLean at the February 1986 leadership convention.

== Senate ==
=== Leader of the Independent Senate Liberal Caucus ===
On January 29, 2014, Liberal Party leader Justin Trudeau announced all Liberal Senators, including Cowan, were removed from the Liberal caucus, and would continue sitting as Independents. The Senators continued to refer to themselves as the Senate Liberal Caucus even if they are no longer members of the parliamentary Liberal caucus. Liberal senators reaffirmed Cowan as their leader in 2014 through internal elections.

At the time that Trudeau removed Cowan and his fellow Liberal Senators from the Liberal caucus, Cowan's daughter Suzanne served as a senior advisor to Trudeau.

When the Liberal Party formed government following the 2015 federal election, new Prime Minister Justin Trudeau did not appoint Senator Cowan as Government Senate Leader. The position was replaced with the Representative of the Government in the Senate and assigned to independent Senator Peter Harder leaving Cowan as leader of the Independent Liberal caucus. Cowan stepped down as Liberal Senate Caucus leader on June 15, 2016. He retired from the Senate upon reaching the mandatory retirement age of 75 on January 22, 2017.

== Family ==
Samuel Rettie is Cowan's great-great uncle.

Political offices
Preceded by Céline Hervieux-Payette	Leader of the Opposition in the Senate of Canada; 2008 - 2015	Succeeded by Claude Carignan
