= Joan Fraser =

Canadian politician

The Honourable Joan Fraser CM

Canadian Senator from Quebec (De Lorimier)
- In office September 17, 1998 – February 2, 2018
- Nominated by: Jean Chrétien
- Appointed by: Roméo LeBlanc
- Preceded by: Philippe Gigantès

Personal details
- Born: October 12, 1944 (age 82) Halifax, Nova Scotia, Canada
- Party: Liberal (until 2014); Independent Liberal (2014-present)

Joan Fraser CM (born October 12, 1944) is a Canadian former senator and journalist.

== Biography ==
Fraser went to Edgehill School and then joined the Montreal Gazette in 1965 after graduating from McGill University. After two years as a cub reporter on the women's page, she joined the Financial Times of Canada where she worked for eleven years and served as news editor, editorial page editor and Montreal bureau chief. She returned to The Gazette in 1978 becoming its editor-in-chief in 1993. In 1996 she left that post and from 1997 to 1998 she was director-general of the Centre for Research and Information on Canada.

In 1998, Fraser was appointed to the Senate on the advice of Prime Minister Jean Chrétien. In the 39th Parliament, she was appointed Deputy Leader of the Opposition in the Senate, working under Leader of the Opposition, Senator Dan Hays, PC.

Fraser has served as President of the Women's Coordinating Committee of the Inter-Parliamentary Union (2004–2006), as well as an ex officio member of the International Executive Committee of the Inter-Parliamentary Union (2002–2006).

Fraser sat as a member of the Senate Liberal Caucus. She was the Deputy Leader of the Opposition in the Senate from 2006 to 2007 and was a member of the Standing Senate Committee on Rules, Procedures and the Rights of Parliament.

Fraser retired from the Senate on February 2, 2018, reaching the mandatory retirement age of 75 the year before. In 2020, she was appointed as a member of the Order of Canada.

== Awards ==
Fraser has won two National Newspaper Awards (1982 and 1991) and four National Newspaper Award Citations of Merit (1986, 1987, 1990, 1994) for editorial writing. She has also won other awards for journalism, communications and her work on women's issues.

== Archives ==
There is a Joan Fraser fonds at Library and Archives Canada.

Parliament of Canada
Preceded by Terry Stratton	Deputy Leader of the Opposition in the Senate; 2006–2007	Succeeded by Claudette Tardif
