= Dennis Dawson =

Canadian politician

The Honourable Dennis Dawson
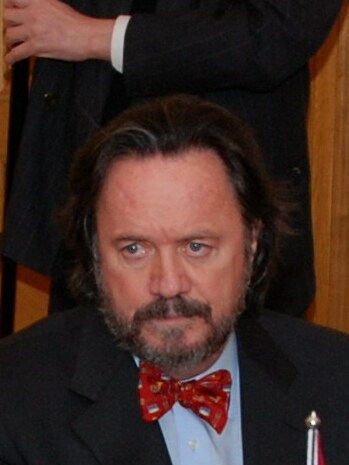
- Dawson in 2010.

Deputy Leader of the Progressive Senate Group
- In office December 12, 2019 – May 31, 2021
- Leader: Jane Cordy
- Preceded by: Terry Mercer
- Succeeded by: Pierre Dalphond

Canadian Senator from Quebec (Lauzon)
- In office August 2, 2005 – February 8, 2023
- Nominated by: Paul Martin
- Appointed by: Adrienne Clarkson
- Preceded by: Yves Morin
- Succeeded by: Suze Youance

Member of Parliament for Louis-Hébert
- In office 1977–1984
- Preceded by: Albanie Morin
- Succeeded by: Suzanne Duplessis

Personal details
- Born: September 28, 1949 (age 76) Quebec City, Quebec, Canada
- Party: Progressive Senate Group (since 2019)
- Other political affiliations: Independent Liberal (2014–2019); Liberal (until 2014)

Dennis Dawson (born September 28, 1949) is a Canadian politician and administrator. Dawson is a retired Canadian Senator and former Member of Parliament (MP) in the House of Commons. He was first elected as an MP in 1977 at the age 27, and was appointed to the Upper Chamber by Prime Minister Paul Martin in 2005.

Born in Quebec City, Quebec, Dawson's first entry into politics was spending five years as a trustee on the Commission des écoles catholiques de Québec. After that, Dawson represented the riding of Louis-Hébert, Quebec in the House of Commons from 1977 to 1984. He is a former Parliamentary Secretary to the Minister of Labour and former Parliamentary Secretary to the Minister of Employment and Immigration.

In 2004, he ran in the federal election as a "star" candidate for the Liberal Party of Canada in the riding of Beauport but was beaten by Bloc Québécois candidate Christian Simard, losing by a ratio of nearly 2:1.

On August 2, 2005, Dawson was appointed to the Canadian Senate on the recommendation of Prime Minister Paul Martin. He represented the Liberal Party of Canada in the Upper Chamber until Justin Trudeau's removal of Liberal Senators from the Canadian Liberal caucus in 2014.

With the Senate Liberal Caucus facing losing official parliamentary caucus status in 2020 with a third of its caucus facing mandatory retirements on their turning age 75, Senator Joseph Day announced that the Senate Liberal Caucus had been dissolved and a new Progressive Senate Group formed in its wake, with the entire membership joining the new group, including this senator.

With Day's mandatory retirement in January 2020, on December 12, 2019, Jane Cordy tweeted that her colleagues in the PSG had selected her as the new leader, ostensibly effective that same date. Additionally, she subsequently announced later that day Terry Mercer would be moving into the Whip/Caucus Chair role, that Dawson would be become the new Deputy Leader, and that the interim monikers were being removed at the same time. Dawson resigned from the Senate on February 8, 2023.

He has two daughters, Cindy and Kathryn-Anne, and a son named Julian.

Parliament of Canada
Preceded by Albanie Morin	Member of Parliament for Louis-Hébert; 1977–1984	Succeeded by Suzanne Duplessis
Preceded by Yves Morin	Senator for Lauzon; 2005–2013	Vacant
