= Charlie Watt =

Canadian politician

The Honourable Charlie Watt OC OQ

Senator for Inkerman, Quebec
- In office January 16, 1984 – March 16, 2018
- Nominated by: Pierre Trudeau
- Appointed by: Edward Schreyer
- Preceded by: Maurice Lamontagne
- Succeeded by: Julie Miville-Dechêne

Personal details
- Born: June 29, 1944 (age 82) Fort Chimo, Quebec, Canada
- Party: Independent Liberal
- Other political affiliations: Liberal
- Relatives: Sheila Watt-Cloutier (sister)
- Committees: Standing Senate Committee on Aboriginal Peoples; Standing Senate Committee on Fisheries and Oceans

Charlie Watt OC OQ (born June 29, 1944) is a former Canadian Senator from Nunavik, Quebec.

A hunter and businessman by profession, Watt is an Inuk and served as Northern officer with the Department of Indian and Northern Affairs from 1969 to 1979. He was an early leader in the Indigenous rights movement in Canada, and represented the Quebec Inuit in the negotiations leading to the James Bay and Northern Quebec Agreement.

In 1984 he was appointed to serve in the Senate of Canada, and he was the second Inuk to achieve this post.

In 1994, he was named Officer of the National Order of Québec.

In 2018, he resigned from the Senate of Canada following 34 years of representing the Inuit in the Upper Chamber. He did so following his election to President of Makivik Corporation. This was his third election to the position, and he achieved it with 54% of the vote.

He resigned from the Senate, effective March 16, 2018 in order to focus on his duties with Makivik.

He is the brother of activist and author Sheila Watt-Cloutier.

== James Bay and Northern Quebec Agreement (1975) ==
At a meeting of representatives from Northern Quebec Inuit communities, held in Inukjuak in April 1971, Charlie Watt was elected as one of the six founding directors of the Northern Quebec Inuit Association, incorporated on June 8, 1972, (now the Makivik Corporation). (Note: The five other directors were Lazarusie Epoo, Johnny Watt, Jacob Oweetaltuk, Silas Cookie, and Tommy Cain.) Although future Quebec Premier Robert Bourassa was convinced of the viability and economic importance of a massive hydroelectric project on Inuit and Cree traditional lands, since his first meeting on December 16, 1969, with then Hydro-Québec president Roland Giroux, it was only when Bourassa became Premier of Quebec on April 29, 1970, that the project was officially introduced in the provincial cabinet in March 1971, and announced to the public on April 30, 1971. The James Bay Hydroelectric Development Project ignored the rights of the Inuit and Cree who lived in northern James Bay and northern Quebec. In 1972 the NQIA and the Quebec Association of Indians applied for an injunction to stop the hydro "project of the century" to the Quebec Superior Court. Although the original ruling in their favour was overturned, by 1975 they had successfully negotiated the "first major comprehensive land claims agreement in northern Canada, heralding in a new era in aboriginal land claims." The James Bay and Northern Quebec Agreement (JBNQA), signed in November 1975, was one of three landmark court decisions that brought about "an important shift in the recognition of the rights of First Nations in Canada."

He has also been active with a number of aboriginal businesses including the Makivik Corporation, Air Inuit, Seaku Fisheries, Uttuulik Leasing, and Kigaq Travel.

Watt served as co-chair of the Inuit Committee on National Issues from 1979 to 1984 and has also served with the Nunavik Constitutional Committee and the Inuit Tapirisat of Canada. Senator Watt also served on the Board of the Circumpolar Chamber of Commerce as one of its first directors. An Officer of the National Order of Quebec (1994), Watt is also the 1997 recipient of the National Aboriginal Achievement Award (now known as the Indspire Awards).

== The Senate of Canada (1984-2018) ==
Watt was appointed to the Senate on January 16, 1984, by Prime Minister Pierre Trudeau. Appointed at age 39, Watt was the second-youngest person at appointment who was then serving in the Senate (and the 2nd Inuk in Canadian history to serve in the upper chamber). Senator Charlie Watt represented the province of Quebec and the Senatorial Division of Inkerman. He served in the Senate of Canada from January 16, 1984 until March 16, 2018.

During his 34 years in the Senate of Canada, Watt founded the Special Committee on Aboriginal Peoples (1984) which later became the Senate Standing Committee on Aboriginal Peoples. He also served on numerous Senate Standing Committees including: Fisheries and Oceans, Legal and Constitutional Affairs, and he is the founder and first Chairman of the Senate Special Committee on the Arctic (2017).

He is most notable for championing Inuit rights in Canada and for speaking his language (Inuktitut) in the Senate Chamber and at committee meetings. He was instrumental in changing Senate rules to allow the use of his mother tongue and for producing the first materials in Inuktitut on the Canadian Parliamentary System.

He is also known for his ongoing work with First Nations and Metis communities in Canada.

In 2007, while serving on the Senate Standing Committee on Legal and Constitutional Affairs, Watt participated in their report called: Taking Section 35 Rights Seriously, non-derogation clauses relating to Aboriginal and Treaty Rights

In September of that same year he introduced Bill S229 An Act to amend the Income Tax Act and the Excise Tax Act (tax relief for Nunavik).

This was to bring attention to the high cost of living in northern Canada. Watt introduced the bill to make Nunavik (northern Quebec) a GST free zone. Although the bill did not make it to the House of Commons, it brought northerners to Ottawa to discuss their unique living situation and the high costs of goods and services.

In December 2011, Watt introduced bill S207 An Act to Amend the Interpretation Act (non-derogation of aboriginal and treaty rights), the committee report was adopted in the Senate, but the bill was dropped from the order paper in June 2013.

In his final year at the Senate of Canada, Watt created the Special Committee on the Arctic and he was the first Chair of the committee. Their work is continuing under the leadership of Senators Patterson and Bovey

Watt was educated at schools in: Kuujjuaq (Fort Chimo), Quebec; Yellowknife, NWT; Kingston, Ontario; Ottawa, Ontario; Montreal, Quebec; Halifax, Nova Scotia, and Brandon, Manitoba.

In 1997, he was awarded the Aboriginal Achievement Award by Buffy Sainte Marie for his role in community development (now called the Indspire Award).

He is married to Ida (Epoo), and is father to Donald, Robert, Lisa, Billy, and Charlene.
