= Maria Chaput =

Canadian politician

The Honourable Maria Chaput CM OM
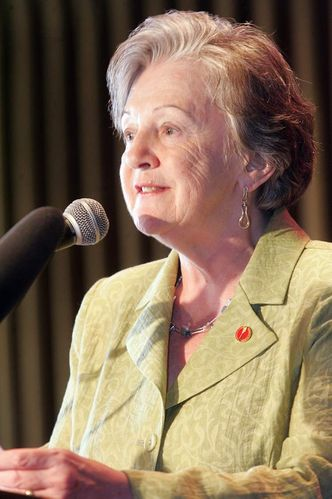
- Senator Maria Chaput

Canadian Senator from Manitoba
- In office December 12, 2002 – March 1, 2016
- Appointed by: Adrienne Clarkson
- Succeeded by: Marilou McPhedran

Personal details
- Born: May 7, 1942 (age 83) Sainte-Anne-des-Chênes, Manitoba, Canada
- Party: Liberal (until 2014); Independent Liberal (2014-present)

Maria Emma Chaput CM OM (born May 7, 1942) is a former member of the Senate of Canada representing the Senatorial Division of Manitoba. She is the first franco-Manitoban woman to be appointed to the upper house of the Parliament of Canada.

== Background ==
On January 29, 2014, Liberal Party leader Justin Trudeau announced all Liberal Senators, including Chaput, to be removed from the Liberal caucus, and would continue sitting as Independents. The Senators continued to refer themselves as the Senate Liberal Caucus even though they were constitutionally no longer members of the parliamentary Liberal caucus.

Chaput announced her retirement from the Senate on February 4, 2016, effective March 1, 2016, due to kidney health issues that she had been managing for "a few years." Despite her doctor's recommendation, she held off retirement until the Liberals won the 2015 federal election saying: "I just didn't want to give my seat to Stephen Harper. That's what I told my doctor and he said, 'Well, that's your decision,' and I said 'Exactly.'" She supported Trudeau's move to a non-partisan senate appointment process.

Chaput was appointed to the Order of Canada in 2022 and was made a member of the Order of Manitoba in 2025.
