= Scar Tissue (novel) =

1993 novel by Michael Ignatieff

- First edition cover
- Author: Michael Ignatieff
- Original title: Scar Tissue
- Language: English
- Subject: Alzheimer's
- Genre: mental illness
- Published: 1993
- Publisher: Farrar, Straus and Giroux
- Publication place: United kingdom
- Pages: 212 pp.
- ISBN: 0374527695

Scar Tissue, Michael Ignatieff’s second novel, was published in 1993 and was shortlisted for the Man Booker Prize of the same year.

== Plot summary ==
The book details one woman’s struggle with Alzheimer's (or dementia, it’s not clear) and how her family respond to it. In particular, it is one of her son’s voice the reader hears since he is narrating it. Another son isn’t involved so much as he is living in Boston practicing as a neuroscientist. So it is the narrator who bears most of the burden. And all the while, he is trying to work on his marriage and his career as a philosophy professor. His own family life is hardly acknowledged and tears in his marriage begin to show, towards his wife; there for moral support but can't come to terms with him not being a consistent, central figure at the moment.

While her illness begins with her repeating stories ad nauseam, things get much worse as she starts to be incapable of recognizing her own family. Thus the prime caretaker – the son – ends up separating from his wife and living in derelict conditions. Nonetheless, he remains positive about the nature of life and death, even once he has lost both his parents, concluding that he “know[s] that there is a life beyond this death, a time beyond this time. I know that at the very last moment…I will be face to face at last with a pure and heartless reality beyond anything a living soul can possibly imagine.”

== Themes ==
The themes of the book are: mental illness, Alzheimer's, aging, adolescence, survival, suffering, familial relationships, love, marital discord, father-son relationship, chronic illness, nursing.

== Awards ==
Shortlisted for the Booker Prize (1994) and Whitbread Awards.

== Acclaim ==
Scar Tissue has received substantial acclaim. It was described as: “powerful Alzheimer's novel [that is] searing and autobiographical” by Marsha Lederman. She adds that the book is: “intense, unblinking and beautifully written, the novel was written in a three-month burst” in the early 1990s, as Ignatieff struggled with his mother’s Alzheimer's (she was still alive when he wrote it) and the death, in 1989, of his father.” According to Frederic and Mary Ann Brussat, “Ignatieff has written a fierce novel about loss.”

Kirkus Reviews wrote: “Disease not as a metaphor but as a prescription for living in a book that confronts our worst fears with bracing insight and finely tuned emotion. A tough read but worth it.” A review in Literature Annotations pointed out: “A hauntingly beautiful narrative, written on several levels from flashback, to pop-scientific journalism (including allusions to the writings of Oliver Sacks), to academic speeches and essays on the nature of death, composed by the protagonist for his students, public, and publishers.”

The Sunday Telegraph said that Scar Tissue was “moving and intellectually challenging. The New Statesman claimed that “no recent British novel has traversed the world of reason and emotion, the human presence and its annihilation, so effectively and directly.” According to Connor Taylor, “this novel seems to exhibit his impressive fiction-writing skills.” He added: “Though at times the novel seemed almost overly dramatic, Scar Tissue’s emotional depth and intellectually stimulating content result in a stunning success for Ignatieff’s second foray into fiction.”

== Theatre adaptation ==
Scar Tissue was adapted for theatre and shown at the Arts Club Theatre Company's Revue Stage in Vancouver.
