= Joseph A. Day =

Canadian politician (1945–2024)

The Honourable Joseph A. Day

Canadian Senator from New Brunswick
- In office October 4, 2001 – January 24, 2020
- Nominated by: Jean Chrétien
- Appointed by: Adrienne Clarkson
- Succeeded by: Jim Quinn

Interim Leader of the Progressive Senate Group
- In office November 14, 2019 – December 11, 2019
- Deputy: Terry Mercer (interim)
- Preceded by: Position established
- Succeeded by: Jane Cordy

Leader of the Senate Liberal Caucus
- In office June 15, 2016 – November 14, 2019
- Preceded by: Jim Cowan
- Succeeded by: Position abolished

Personal details
- Born: January 24, 1945 Saint John, New Brunswick, Canada
- Died: May 27, 2024 (aged 79)
- Party: Progressive Senate Group (2019–2020)
- Other political affiliations: Senate Liberal (2014–2019); Liberal (until 2014); NB Liberal

Joseph A. Day (January 24, 1945 – May 27, 2024) was a Canadian politician. He was a Canadian Senator from October 4, 2001 until January 24, 2020, and was the leader of the Senate Liberal Caucus from June 15, 2016, to November 14, 2019. He became the interim leader of the Progressive Senate Group on November 14, 2019, and served for slightly less than one month in the role. On the eve of his pending retirement from the Senate, Day tweeted his farewell remarks. He mentioned that it was an honour to serve his fellow New Brunswickers and all Canadians. Furthermore, he also gave a farewell speech. He retired from the Senate on January 24, 2020, upon reaching the mandatory retirement age of 75.

== Education and early career ==
Day studied at College Militaire Royal Saint-Jean in 1963. He graduated from the Royal Military College of Canada in Kingston, Ontario in 1968 with a Bachelor of Engineering degree. He served in the Royal Canadian Air Force from 1963 to 1968 and held the rank of Lieutenant-colonel. He is an honorary member of the Royal Military College of Canada, and served on its Board of Governors from 2004 to 2007. Day subsequently earned a Bachelor of Law degree from Queen's University and a Masters of Law from Osgoode Hall Law School. Over the course of his legal career, Day has been recognized as a specialist in intellectual property matters by the Law Society of Upper Canada, and is a fellow of the Intellectual Property Institute of Canada.

Day entered politics in 1978, when a by-election was held in his native New Brunswick. Day returned from his practice of law in Ottawa, Ontario, to contest the by-election as a candidate of the Liberal Party of Canada, but was defeated in what had long been a Progressive Conservative stronghold.

He faced the same electorate three times in two years due to the rapid succession of general elections that came in May 1979 and February 1980.

In 1982, he ran for the leadership of the New Brunswick Liberal Party, but was narrowly defeated on the final ballot by Doug Young. The leadership race was very divisive, and the Liberals went down to their worst defeat in recent history in the 1982 provincial election. Day, who sought election to the Legislative Assembly of New Brunswick in a Saint John riding, was defeated in his fifth contest in five years.

Day's wife, Georgie Day, was elected to the legislature, on her first attempt in electoral politics, in 1991, and was re-elected in 1995. While in the legislature, she served in the cabinets of premiers Frank McKenna, Ray Frenette, and Camille Thériault.

== Senate ==
Day was appointed to the Senate of Canada from New Brunswick in 2001. He has been active on issues of Veterans Affairs Canada and media concentration.

On January 29, 2014, Liberal Party leader Justin Trudeau announced all Liberal Senators, including Day, were removed from the Liberal caucus, and would continue sitting as Independents. According to Senate Opposition leader James Cowan, the Senators will still refer to themselves as Liberals even if they are no longer members of the parliamentary Liberal caucus.

Day was elected leader of the Senate Liberal Caucus on June 15, 2016.

With the Senate Liberal Caucus facing losing official parliamentary caucus status in 2020 with a third of its caucus facing mandatory retirements on their turning age 75, Day announced that the Senate Liberal Caucus had been dissolved and a new Progressive Senate Group formed in its wake, with the entire membership joining the new group, including Day, who was announced as the interim leader of the new group.

With Day's mandatory retirement in January 2020, on December 12, 2019, Nova Scotia senator Jane Cordy tweeted that her colleagues in the Progressive Senate Group had selected her as the new leader, ostensibly effective that same date. Additionally, she subsequently announced later that day Senator Terry Mercer would be moving into the whip/caucus chair role, that Senator Dennis Dawson would become the new deputy leader, and that the interim monikers were being removed at the same time. On the eve of his pending retirement from the Senate, Day tweeted, "On the eve of my retirement from the @SenateCA, I would like to share my farewell remarks. It has been an honour to serve my fellow New Brunswickers and all Canadians. Watch my speech here: [...] #SenCA #cdnpoli #nbpoli." He retired from the Senate on January 24, 2020, upon reaching the mandatory retirement age of 75.

Day died on May 27, 2024. His funeral was held in Hampton.

== See also ==
- Veterans Affairs Canada
