= 2013 Liberal Party of Canada leadership election =

Party election in Canada

- April 14, 2013

30,800 points available 15,401 to win
- Turnout: 82.16%
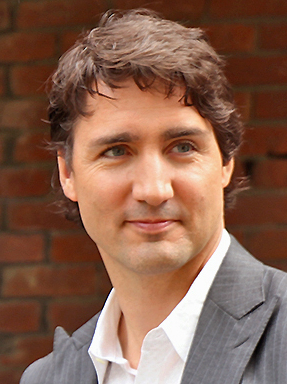

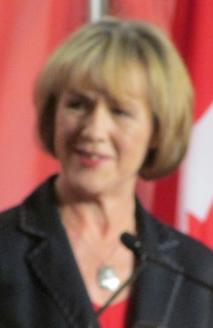

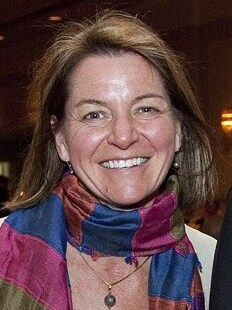
Candidate	Justin Trudeau	Joyce Murray	Martha Hall Findlay
Points	24,668.71 (80.09%)	3,130.76 (10.16%)	1,760.43 (5.72%)
Popular vote	81,389 (78.76%)	12,148 (11.76%)	6,585 (6.37%)
Leader before election
Bob Rae (interim)
Michael Ignatieff (elected)
Elected leader
Justin Trudeau

2013 Liberal leadership election
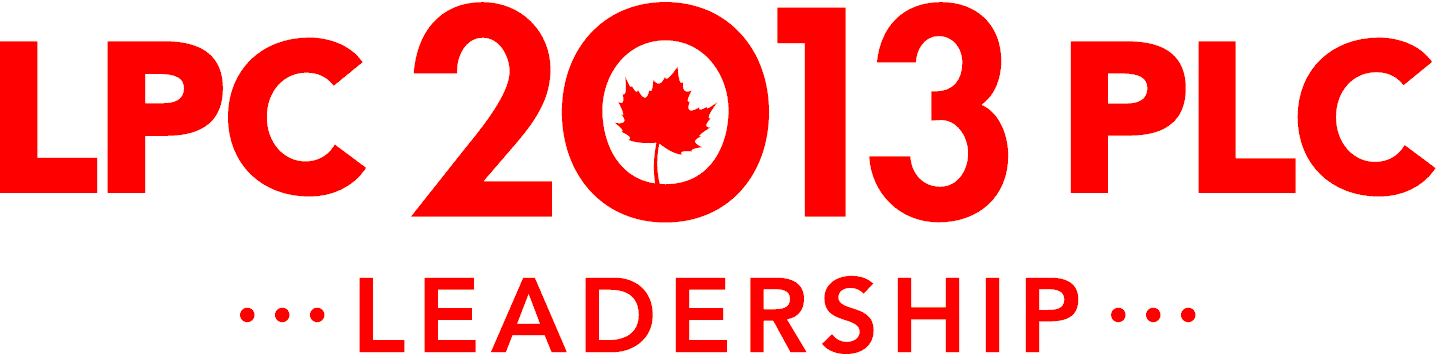
- Date: April 14, 2013
- Convention: Westin Hotel, Ottawa
- Resigning leader: Michael Ignatieff
- Won by: Justin Trudeau
- Ballots: 1
- Candidates: 6
- Entrance fee: $75,000 CDN
- Spending limit: $950,000 CDN

In 2013, the Liberal Party of Canada held a leadership election to elect a new party leader. The election was triggered by Michael Ignatieff's announcement, on May 3, 2011, of his intention to resign as leader following the party's defeat in the 2011 federal election. On May 25, 2011, Bob Rae was appointed by Liberal caucus as interim leader. The party announced Justin Trudeau as its new leader on April 14, 2013, in Ottawa, Ontario.

Justin Trudeau would go on to become the 23rd prime minister of Canada in the 2015 Canadian federal election in which the Liberal Party won 184 seats, an increase of 150 seats from 34 seats in the 2011 election, the largest-ever numerical increase by a party in a Canadian election.

== Leadership election timing ==
Michael Ignatieff declared on May 3, 2011, that he intended to resign as leader of the Liberal Party of Canada, but his statement was worded so as not to be an actual resignation to avoid immediately triggering a leadership vote under party rules; he tendered a letter of resignation to the party's National Board of Directors on May 11. Under the provisions of the party's constitution, the Board was required to set a date for a leadership vote to be held within five months thereafter. However several MPs expressed their reluctance to hold a third leadership election in eight years and instead wanted to take the four years of electoral stability provided by a majority parliament as an opportunity to rebuild under an interim leader for as much as two years before selecting a permanent leader.

The Board met as required on May 19 and set the election for October 28 and 29, 2011, but adopted a proposed constitutional amendment allowing this leadership election to be held between March 1 and June 30, 2013, with the exact date to be announced no sooner than five months in advance. The next convention of the party adopted the amendment on June 18, 2011. On June 13, 2012, the Board decided to call the leadership vote for April 2013 with a specific date to be confirmed during the summer. The Board subsequently established April 14, 2013, as the date the leadership election winner is to be announced and November 14, 2012, as the official start of the race. It also set a spending limit of $950,000 and a debt limit of $75,000, both considerably lower figures than allowed in 2006.

== Interim leader ==
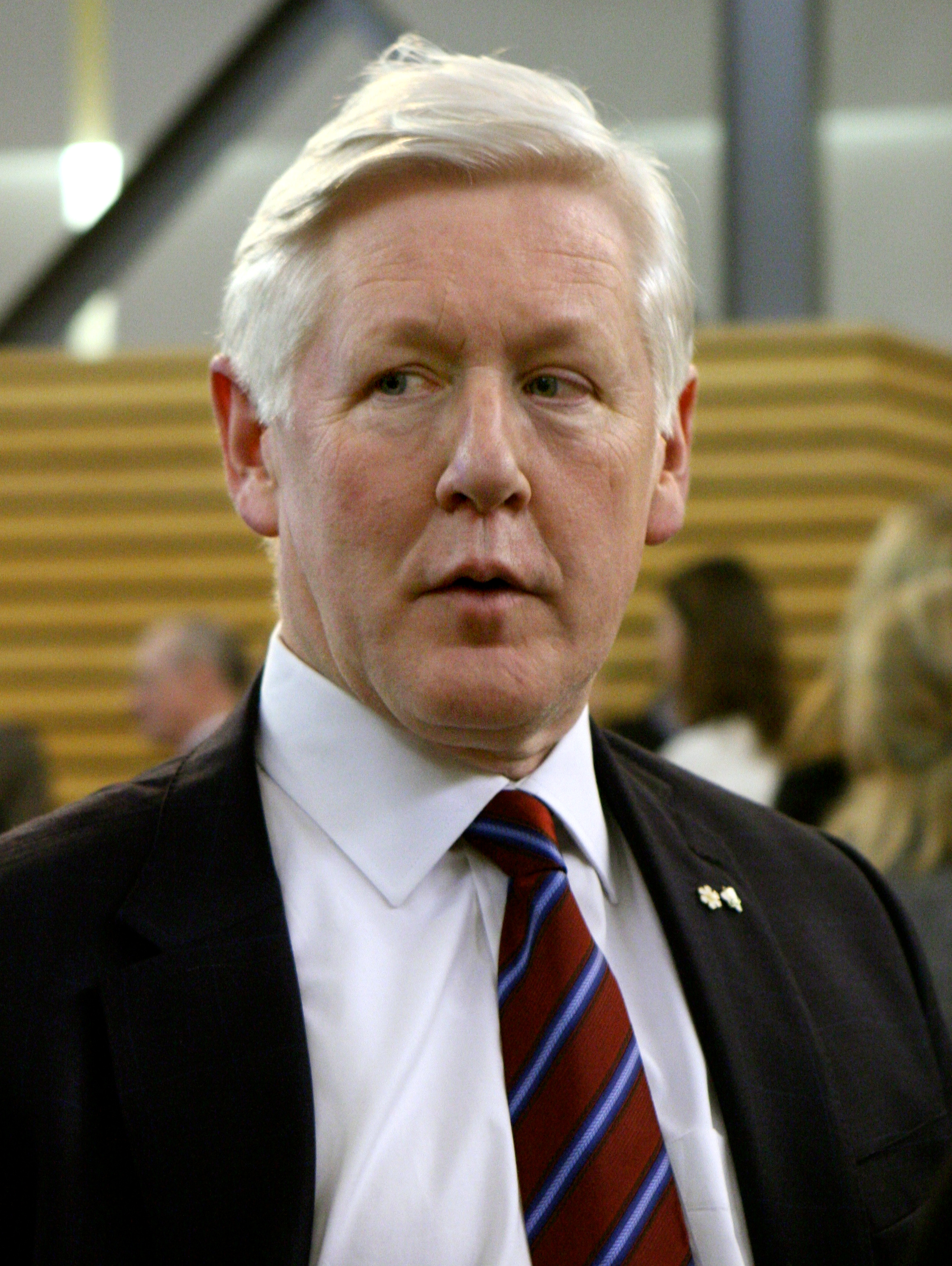
Bob Rae in 2007

In the case of a vacancy in the leadership, the Board is required to meet to appoint an interim leader "in consultation" with the parliamentary caucus, i.e., its 34 MPs and 46 senators. Before this meeting, the Board determined it would not consider anyone unless that person has the support of a majority of MPs and of the caucus as a whole, was bilingual, and promised in writing not to seek the permanent leadership and not to discuss or negotiate significant changes to the party, which would include a merger with the New Democratic Party (NDP). This was taken as intended to exclude Bob Rae a potential leadership candidate who had significant support among Liberal senators and had talked about a merger shortly after the general election loss, as well as Deputy Leader Ralph Goodale, who is not bilingual, and any other MP who may intend to run in the leadership campaign. Nonetheless, after the caucus discussed the interim leadership on May 11, 2011, it met again on May 25 and voted to recommend Rae as interim leader over Marc Garneau; the Board subsequently confirmed the appointment. Rumoured candidates who did not run for interim leader included Goodale, Carolyn Bennett, Scott Brison, and John McCallum.

In June 2012, the Board was expected to release Rae from his promise and allow him to run for the party leadership provided he stepped down as interim leader when Parliament rose for the summer. However, Rae announced on June 13, 2012, that he would not be running for the permanent leadership and remained interim leader until Trudeau was announced as the new leader April 14, 2013.

== Process ==
130,774 Liberal Party members and supporters registered to vote in the election of almost 300,000 who were eligible. General voting took place from April 7 to April 14, 2013, by preferential ballot (instant-runoff voting) online and by phone. Each electoral district was allocated 100 points with points in a district allocated in proportion to each candidate by the number of first preference votes received. All points were then aggregated nationally for a "national count". If no candidate received 15,401 points on the first count, then the candidate with the fewest points would be eliminated and his/her votes are distributed in each electoral district among the remaining leadership contestants according to the next preference indicated. This process would then continue until one candidate has more than 15,401 points. Trudeau was selected on the first ballot.

== Timeline ==
=== 2011 ===
- May 2 – Federal election reduces the Liberal Party to 34 seats in the House of Commons, third place behind the Conservative Party and the NDP.
- May 3 – Liberal leader Michael Ignatieff informs a press conference that he does not intend to continue as party leader.
- May 9 – Liberal Party National Board of Directors sets rules that the party's interim leader had to be bilingual and agree not to run as permanent leader or to pursue any merger talks with the NDP.
- May 11 – Ignatieff formally tenders his resignation in a letter to the Liberal Party's National Board of Directors.
- May 25 – Liberal caucus votes to recommend Bob Rae over Marc Garneau as interim leader; Rae's election as interim leader confirmed by the National Board.
- June 18 – An extraordinary convention of the party is held via conference call in which the party's constitution is amended to allow the leadership election to be delayed from the fall of 2011 to between March 1 and June 30, 2013.

=== 2012 ===
- January 14 – Liberal biennial convention adopts proposal for a new "supporter" class of non-members who will join members in the right to elect the new leader.
- April 21 – Liberal National Board of Directors meets to discuss rules for the leadership election; most decisions are deferred until a subsequent meeting to be held in June.
- May 2 – Liberal Party opens the "supporter" category of party affiliation allowing Canadians who are not paid members or members of another political party to vote for the Liberal leadership after affirming that they "support the Liberal Party of Canada".
- June 13 – Liberal National Board met to clarify rules for the leadership election, including whether or not the interim leader is eligible to run. The Board decided that the leadership election will be held April 2013 with a specific date to be confirmed during the summer. Hours prior to the meeting, Rae announces he will not be a candidate in the leadership election.
- June 27 – Deborah Coyne begins her campaign.
- September 6 – Party announces that the winner of the election will be made public on April 14, 2013, in Ottawa, Ontario. Additionally, the party sets an entrance fee of $75,000 ($25,000 when the candidate registers and two further installments of $25,000) and a spending limit of $950,000. Candidates may not accumulate more than $75,000 of debt.
- October 2 – Justin Trudeau begins his campaign.
- November 7 – David Bertschi begins his campaign.
- November 14 –
  - Official start to the leadership race.
  - Martha Hall Findlay and Karen McCrimmon begin their campaigns.
- November 26 – Joyce Murray begins her campaign.
- November 28 – Marc Garneau begins his campaign.
- November 29 – George Takach begins his campaign.
- December 15 – Deadline for registered candidates to have paid at least $50,000 of the $75,000 entry fee.

=== 2013 ===
- January 13 – Martin Cauchon begins his campaign.
- January 14 – Deadline for candidates to file a nomination form signed by at least 300 members of the party, including at least 100 members from each of three different provinces or territories, and to have paid the final installment of the $75,000 registration fee.
- January 20 – Liberal Party of Canada Leadership Debate in Vancouver, British Columbia.
- February 2 – Liberal Party of Canada Leadership Debate in Winnipeg, Manitoba.
- February 16 – Liberal Party of Canada Leadership Debate in Mississauga, Ontario.
- February 25 – Takach withdraws from the race.
- March 3, 2013 –
  - Liberal Party of Canada Leadership Debate in Halifax, Nova Scotia.
  - Last day to become a member or supporter of the Liberal Party to be entitled to vote for the leader.
- March 13, – Garneau withdraws from the race citing his ranking in a March 7 robocall poll which, on March 14, his team admitted did not comply with CRTC rules.
- March 21 – Deadline for members and supporters to register to vote (extended from March 14, 2013).
- March 21 – Bertschi withdraws from the race.
- March 23 – Liberal Party of Canada Leadership Debate in Montreal, Quebec.
- April 6 – Liberal Party of Canada Leadership National Showcase in Toronto, Ontario. Voting begins using preferential ballot.
- April 14 –
  - 3:00 p.m. ET (UTC−4); Voting ends.
  - 5:00–7:00 p.m. ET; Result announcement in the Confederation Ballroom at the Westin Hotel in Ottawa.

== Candidates ==
Candidates on the ballot are listed below.

=== Martin Cauchon ===
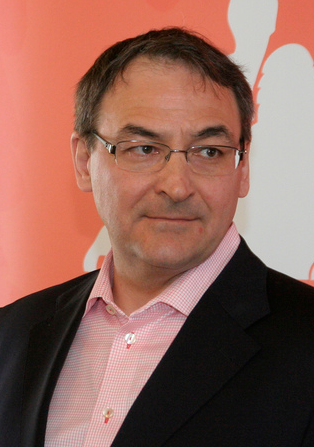
Martin Cauchon

Background

Martin Cauchon, 49, was the MP for Outremont from 1993 to 2004 and served in the cabinet of Jean Chrétien as Minister of Justice from 2002 to 2003. Cauchon was the Liberal candidate in Outremont in the 2011 federal election but was defeated by New Democrat Tom Mulcair.

Date campaign launched: January 13, 2013
Campaign website: www.martincauchon.ca

Endorsements of Martin Cauchon

Other prominent individuals (4)

- Francesco Bellini, research scientist and entrepreneur.
- France Chrétien Desmarais, lawyer and daughter of former Prime Minister Jean Chrétien.
- Pierre Jean Jeanniot, President and CEO of JINMAG Inc.
- Jean-François Lapointe, opera singer.

=== Deborah Coyne ===
Background

Deborah Coyne, 58, was a Toronto lawyer, professor, author and Liberal candidate for Toronto—Danforth in the 2006 federal election. She worked in the Prime Minister's Office in the 1980s and between 1989 and 1991 she was a constitutional adviser to Newfoundland Premier Clyde Wells.

Date campaign launched: June 27, 2012
Campaign website: www.deborahcoyne.ca

Endorsements of Deborah Coyne

Former Members of Parliament (1)

- Derek Lee, MP for Scarborough—Rouge River (1988–2011).

Other information

- Coyne released a significant number of policy ideas on her website the day she announced her bid. Among the proposal outlined on her website were; the implementation of a carbon tax, allowing a mix of public and private health care to meet national health care standards, reforming the electoral system, reassessing supply management of dairy products, eliminating tax credits to simplify the tax system, abolishing the Indian Act, and replacing sporadic first ministers meetings with a formal council of Canadian governments.

=== Martha Hall Findlay ===
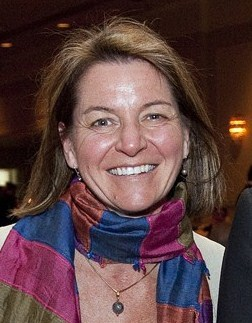
Martha Hall Findlay

Background

Martha Hall Findlay, 53, was MP for Willowdale from 2008 to 2011. She was opposition critic for transport, infrastructure and communities (2008–2009), public works (2009–2010) and international trade (2010–2011). She ran in the 2006 leadership election, where she placed last.

Date campaign launched: November 14, 2012

Campaign website: www.marthahallfindlay.ca

Endorsements of Martha Hall Findlay
- Past MPs: John Herron, Fundy Royal
- Provincial politicians: (4) James Doyle NB former MLA Miramichi-Bay du Vin; Kent Hehr AB MLA for Calgary-Buffalo; Aldéa Landry former Deputy Premier of New Brunswick; Weslyn Mather, AB former MLA for Edmonton-Mill Woods;
- Other prominent individuals: (2) Norrie McCain, former Lieutenant Governor of New Brunswick; Jonathan Mousley, withdrawn leadership candidate, author Nanda Lwin

Other information

- As Executive Fellow with the School of Public Policy at the University of Calgary, Hall Findlay released a paper calling for the abolition of supply management in Canada's agriculture sector. With the launch of her leadership campaign she announced that she would release policy planks every few weeks. Her first policy proposal called for a national energy strategy for energy infrastructure.

=== Karen McCrimmon ===
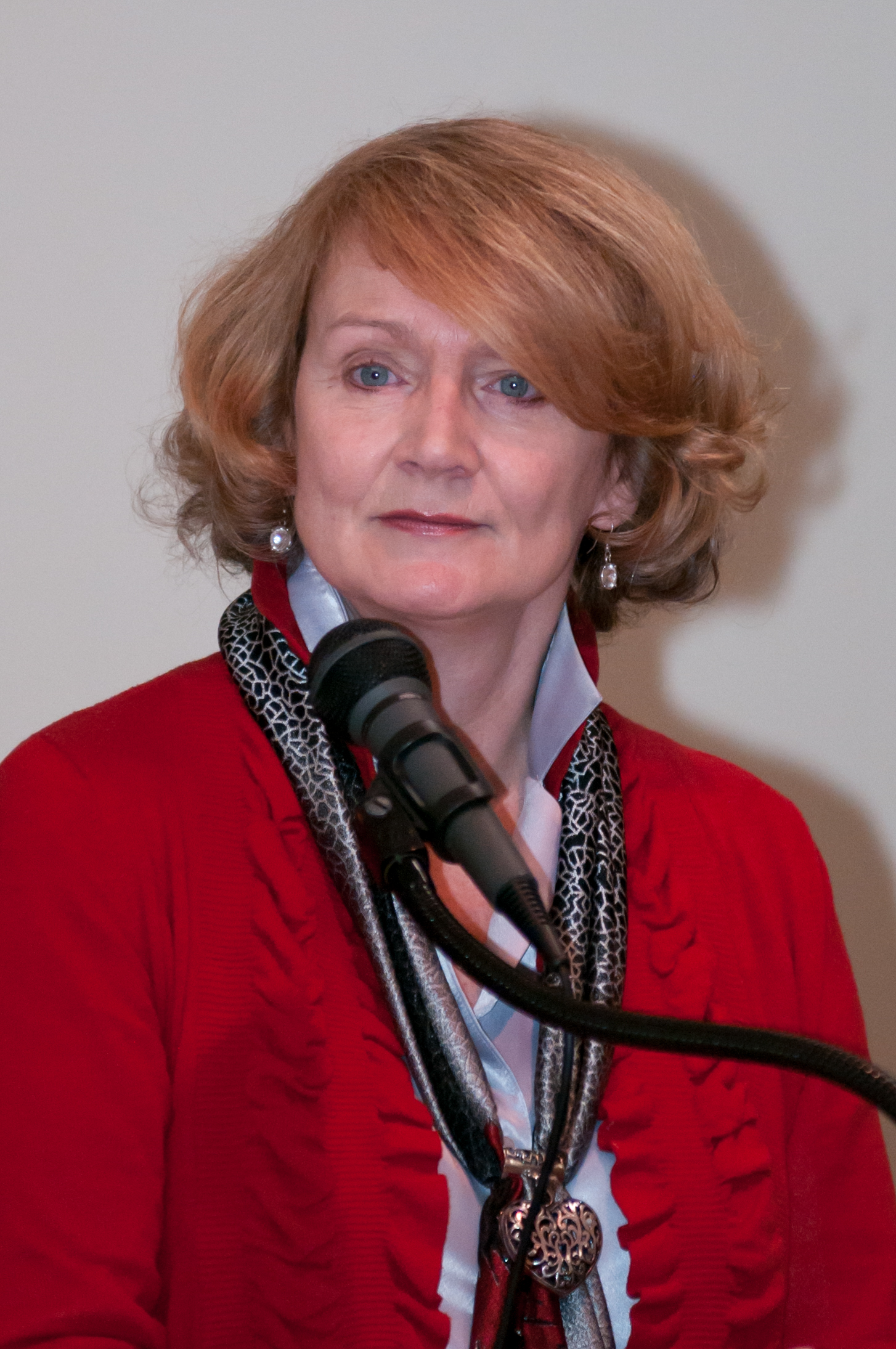
Karen McCrimmon

Background

Karen McCrimmon is a retired Canadian Forces Lieutenant colonel who was the first woman to command a Royal Canadian Air Force squadron (429 Transport Squadron). She was the Liberal candidate in Carleton—Mississippi Mills during the 2011 election. McCrimmon served in the Gulf War, with NATO forces during the Yugoslav Wars, and the War in Afghanistan, and in 1995 was admitted to the Order of Military Merit in the rank of Officer.

Date campaign launched: November 14, 2012
Campaign website: karenmccrimmon.ca

=== Joyce Murray ===
Background

Joyce Murray, 58, has been the Liberal MP for Vancouver Quadra since 2008 and served as Opposition Critic for Small Business and Tourism, Asia — Pacific Gateway and Western Economic Diversification (2011–2015). BC Liberal MLA for New Westminster (2001–2005). BC Minister of Water, Land and Air Protection (2001–2004). BC Minister of Management Services (2004–2005)

Date campaign launched: November 26, 2012
Campaign website: joycemurray.ca

Endorsements of Joyce Murray
- MPs: (2) Bruce Hyer, (Independent MP) Thunder Bay—Superior North; Ted Hsu, Kingston and the Islands
- Past MPs: (4) Lloyd Axworthy, Winnipeg South Centre; Peter Milliken, Kingston and the Islands; Christine Stewart, Northumberland; Paddy Torsney, Burlington;
- Senators: (2) Larry Campbell; Céline Hervieux-Payette
- Provincial politicians: (4) Judi Tyabji, former BC MLA for Okanagan East; John Richards SK former MLA for Saskatoon University; Gordon Wilson, former cabinet minister and former BC MLA for Powell River-Sunshine Coast; Kay Young, former cabinet minister and former Newfoundland and Labrador MHA for Terra Nova
- Other prominent individuals: (6) David Suzuki, scientist, broadcaster and environmental activist; author Claudia Casper; Peter H. Russell, writer and Professor Emeritus of political science at the University of Toronto; Mark Jaccard, professor in the School of Resource and Environmental Management at Simon Fraser University; Matthew Kalkman, author of New Liberalism; David Merner, withdrawn candidate and former president BC wing of the Liberal Party

Other information

- Murray is the only candidate who supports holding "run-off" nominations with NDP and Greens in some ridings in order to choose joint candidates, for the 2015 election. Should the parties receive a plurality of the seats, they would then pass electoral reform. Green Party leader Elizabeth May praised Murray for advancing the proposal.
- On March 26, Murray claimed to possibly have a greater number of registered supporters than Trudeau.

=== Justin Trudeau ===
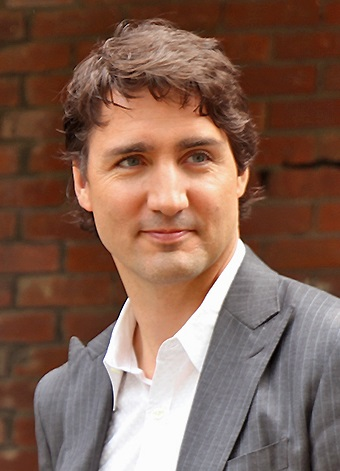
Justin Trudeau

Background

Justin Trudeau, 41, had been MP for Papineau since 2008 and was Liberal Post Secondary Education, Youth and Amateur Sport Critic (2011–2015). He is the son of former Prime Minister Pierre Trudeau. Trudeau had ruled out a leadership bid but reconsidered in the wake of Bob Rae's announcement that he was not running.

Date campaign launched: October 2, 2012
Campaign website: www.justin.ca

Endorsements of Justin Trudeau
- MPs: (24) Scott Andrews, Avalon; Mauril Bélanger, Ottawa—Vanier; Scott Brison, Kings—Hants; Gerry Byrne, Humber—St. Barbe—Baie Verte; Sean Casey, Charlottetown; Irwin Cotler, Mount Royal; Rodger Cuzner, Cape Breton—Canso; Kirsty Duncan, Etobicoke North; Wayne Easter, Malpeque; Mark Eyking, Sydney—Victoria; Hedy Fry, Vancouver Centre; Marc Garneau, Westmount—Ville-Marie; Ralph Goodale, Wascana; Kevin Lamoureux, Winnipeg North; Dominic LeBlanc, Beauséjour; Lawrence MacAulay, Cardigan; John McCallum, Markham—Unionville; John McKay, Scarborough-Guildwood; Massimo Pacetti, Saint-Léonard—Saint-Michel; Geoff Regan, Halifax West; Judy Sgro, York West; Scott Simms, Bonavista—Gander—Grand Falls—Windsor; Lise St-Denis, Saint-Maurice—Champlain; Frank Valeriote, Guelph
- Past MPs: (15) Omar Alghabra, Mississauga—Erindale; Navdeep Bains, Mississauga—Brampton South; Don Boudria, Glengarry—Prescott—Russell; Bill Casey (former Independent MP), Cumberland—Colchester—Musquodoboit Valley; Siobhán Coady, St. John's South—Mount Pearl; Sheila Copps, Hamilton East; Bonnie Crombie, Mississauga—Streetsville; John English, Kitchener; Mark Holland, Ajax—Pickering; Dan McTeague, Pickering—Scarborough East; Dennis Mills, Toronto—Danforth; Marcel Proulx, Hull—Aylmer; Pablo Rodríguez, Honoré-Mercier; Mike Savage, Dartmouth—Cole Harbour; Paul Szabo, Mississauga South
- Senators: (18)
- Maria Chaput; Marie Charette-Poulin; Dennis Dawson; Joseph A. Day; Pierre de Bané; Art Eggleton; Joan Fraser; George Furey; Mac Harb; Elizabeth Hubley; Mobina Jaffer; Serge Joyal; Paul Massicotte; Terry Mercer; Jim Munson; Pierrette Ringuette; Fernand Robichaud; David Smith
- Provincial politicians: (13) Rick Bartolucci Ontario MPP for Sudbury; Jim Bradley Minister of the Environment and Ontario MPP for St. Catharines; Marie Bountrogianni Former cabinet minister and Ontario MPP for Hamilton Mountain; Zach Churchill Nova Scotia MLA for Yarmouth; Dwight Duncan Former Deputy Premier, Minister of Finance, and Ontario MPP for Windsor—Tecumseh; Maryse Gaudreault Quebec MNA for Hull; Jon Gerrard, Leader of the Manitoba Liberal Party Yvonne Jones Newfoundland and Labrador MHA for Cartwright-L'Anse au Clair; Jean-Marc Lalonde Former Ontario MPP for Glengarry—Prescott—Russell; Geoff MacLellan, Nova Scotia MLA for Glace Bay; Stephen McNeil, Leader of the Nova Scotia Liberal Party; David Peterson, former Premier of Ontario; Sandra Pupatello, Former cabinet minister and Ontario MPP for Windsor West
- Other prominent individuals: (7)
- Gerald Butts, President and CEO of World Wildlife Fund Canada and former Principal Secretary to Ontario Premier Dalton McGuinty; activist Craig Kielburger; Guy Laliberté, co-founder and CEO of Cirque du Soleil; philanthropist Phyllis Lambert; Hazel McCallion, Mayor of Mississauga; actor Zaib Shaikh; George Takach, former leadership candidate

Other information

- Trudeau endorsed the takeover of the Canadian oil and gas company Nexen by the Hong Kong-based CNOOC Limited.
- Trudeau had stated his opposition to the Enbridge Northern Gateway Pipelines and come out in favour for the use of existing pipelines to transport diluted bitumen to Saint John, New Brunswick. He supports the Keystone XL pipeline and export projects, and has criticized NDP leader Tom Mulcair for opposing Keystone.
- Trudeau has stated that he is "completely closed to any form of cooperation with the NDP."

== Withdrawn candidates ==
Candidates who filed nomination papers and paid the required installments of their registration fee, but withdrew from the ballot.

=== David Bertschi ===
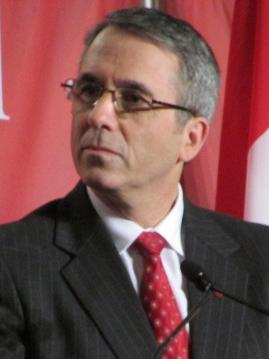
David Bertschi

Background

David Bertschi is an Ottawa lawyer and was the federal Liberal candidate in Ottawa—Orléans during the 2011 election. In 2012, he established an exploratory committee to assess his leadership prospects, and announced his candidacy on November 7, before ending his campaign on March 21, 2013, without endorsing another candidate.

Bertschi subsequently ran for the Liberal nomination in Orléans ahead of the 2015 election, though was disqualified, with the party citing Bertschi's failure to repay debts from his leadership campaign. Bertschi subsequently ran for the Conservatives in Orléans in the 2019 general election, but lost in a landslide.

Date campaign launched: November 7, 2012
Date campaign ended: March 21, 2013
Campaign website: davidbertschi.ca
Supporters

- Provincial politicians: (2) Phil McNeely ON MPP for Ottawa—Orléans; Jean Poirier ON former MPP for Prescott and Russell

=== Marc Garneau ===
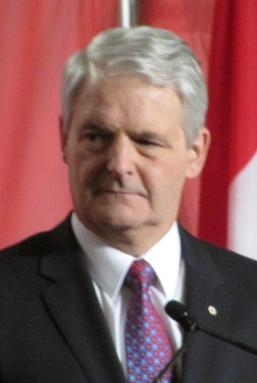
Marc Garneau

Background

Marc Garneau, 64, has been MP for Westmount—Ville-Marie since 2008. He was Liberal House Leader from 2011 and 2012. Prior to entering politics, Garneau was a captain in the Royal Canadian Navy and an astronaut, and was the President of the Canadian Space Agency from 2001 to 2005. Garneau stood for the position of interim leadership but was passed over in favour of Bob Rae.
Garneau withdrew on March 13, 2013, and endorsed Justin Trudeau after concluding that the latter's lead was insurmountable. Garneau had previously suggested that Trudeau lacked substance and was "untested".

Date campaign launched: November 28, 2012
Date campaign ended: March 13, 2013
Campaign website: marcgarneau.ca
Supporters

- MPs: (3) Ted Hsu, Kingston and the Islands; Jim Karygiannis, Scarborough—Agincourt; John McKay, Scarborough-Guildwood
- Past MPs: (1) Andy Mitchell, Parry Sound-Muskoka

=== George Takach ===
Background

George Takach is a Toronto based technology lawyer at the McCarthy Tetrault law firm. Takach declared his candidacy in November 2012, but withdrew from the race on February 25, 2013, and endorsed Justin Trudeau.

Takach was born in Toronto of Hungarian descent. He went to the University of Toronto for his BA and JD (law degree) and received his MA in International Relations from the Norman Patterson School of International Affairs Carleton University.

During the campaign he supported improvements to the country's high-tech infrastructure. He also supported the legalization of marijuana and was opposed to a merger with the NDP.

Date campaign launched: November 29, 2012
Date campaign ended: February 25, 2013
Campaign website: georgetakach.ca
Supporters

- Past MPs: (1) Donald Macdonald, Rosedale
- Other prominent individuals: (2) Liberal strategist Mark Marissen, retired Supreme Court Justice Ian Binnie

Other information

- Takach is against a merger with the NDP, and against cooperation with the NDP or the Greens.

=== Candidates who withdrew before registering ===
- Alex Burton, Vancouver crown prosecutor, declared but later withdrew without having registered as a candidate.
- Shane Geschiere, Manitoba paramedic, declared but later withdrew without having registered as a candidate.
- David Merner, former president of the British Columbia wing of the Liberal Party of Canada. Announced his candidacy but withdrew from the campaign in January 2013 without having formally registered as a candidate. Later endorsed Murray. Merner subsequently ran as the Liberal candidate in Esquimalt—Saanich—Sooke in 2015; Merner later joined the Green Party and ran as their candidate in the same riding in 2019 before seeking the party leadership in 2020.
- Jonathan Mousley, senior government economist, former assistant to then-MP David Collenette, unsuccessfully ran for the Liberal nomination in Don Valley West in 2008. Declared his candidacy in June 2012 but withdrew the following January without having registered as a candidate. Mousley later endorsed Hall Findlay.

== Declined to run ==
- Scott Brison, MP for Kings—Hants
- Mark Carney, Governor of the Bank of Canada and Governor-designate of the Bank of England.
- Jean Charest, former Premier of Quebec and former MP for Sherbrooke (1984–1998), former leader of the Progressive Conservative Party of Canada (1993–1998)
- Denis Coderre, MP for Bourassa
- Robert Ghiz, MLA for Charlottetown-Brighton and Premier of Prince Edward Island
- Mark Holland, former MP Ajax—Pickering (2004–2011)
- Ted Hsu, MP for Kingston and the Islands
- Jim Karygiannis, MP for Scarborough—Agincourt
- Gerard Kennedy, former MP for Parkdale—High Park (2008–2011)
- Dominic LeBlanc, MP for Beauséjour
- John Manley, former MP for Ottawa South (1988–2004) and Deputy Prime Minister (2002–2003)
- John McCallum, MP for Markham—Unionville
- Dalton McGuinty, MPP for Ottawa South and former Premier of Ontario
- David McGuinty, MP for Ottawa South
- Frank McKenna, former Premier of New Brunswick (1987–1997)
- Taleeb Noormohamed, Liberal candidate North Vancouver (2011)
- Bob Rae, current interim leader and MP for Toronto Centre and former NDP Premier of Ontario (1990–1995)
- Geoff Regan, MP for Halifax West

== Newspaper endorsements ==
Newspaper	Candidate Endorsed	Reference
The Prince Arthur Herald	Martha Hall Findlay	
Toronto Star	Justin Trudeau	

== Results ==
Justin Trudeau won the 2013 Liberal leadership in a landslide first-ballot victory and led the third-place party into a majority government in the 2015 federal election. The voter turnout was 82.16% of all registered voters.

First Ballot
Candidate	Votes cast	%	Points allocated	%
Justin Trudeau	81,389	78.76%	24,668.71	80.09%
Joyce Murray	12,148	11.76%	3,130.76	10.16%
Martha Hall Findlay	6,585	6.37%	1,760.43	5.72%
Martin Cauchon	1,630	1.58%	815.86	2.65%
Deborah Coyne	833	0.81%	214.14	0.70%
Karen McCrimmon	757	0.73%	210.08	0.68%
Rejected Ballots	1,210			
Total	104,552	100.00	30,800	100.00

Justin Trudeau won the most points in all but five of the 308 ridings, with the remaining five (British Columbia Southern Interior, Vancouver East, Vancouver Island North, Vancouver Kingsway, and Vancouver Quadra) all being won by Joyce Murray.

Votes
Trudeau	78.76%
Murray	11.76%
Findlay	6.37%
Cauchon	1.58%
Coyne	0.81%
McCrimmon	0.73%

Points
Trudeau	80.09%
Murray	10.16%
Findlay	5.72%
Cauchon	2.65%
Coyne	0.70%
McCrimmon	0.68%

== Opinion polling ==
=== All Canadians ===
Polling firm	Last date of polling	Link	Sample size	Mark Carney	Deborah Coyne	Ken Dryden	Marc Garneau	Martha Hall Findlay	Gerard Kennedy	Dominic LeBlanc	David McGuinty	Joyce Murray	Bob Rae	Justin Trudeau	Other/ Undecided
Forum Research	January 17, 2013	PDF	1,626	—	2%	—	10%	3%	—	—	—	2%	—	34%	Don't know 26% None of these 19% Martin Cauchon 3% George Takach 1%
Forum Research	December 18, 2012	PDF	1,355	—	1%	—	12%	2%	—	—	—	2%	—	39%	None of these 23% Don't know 19% David Bertschi 1% George Takach 1%
Léger Marketing	December 6, 2012	PDF	1,500	—	1%	—	16%	3%	—	—	—	0%	—	38%	Don't know 42% David Bertschi 0% Alex Burton 0% Karen McCrimmon 0% David Merner 0% Jonathan Mousley 0% René Roy 0% George Takach 0%
Forum Research	June 15, 2012	PDF	1,529	—	—	—	4%	4%	5%	4%	6%	—	—	23%	Don't know 44% John Manley 7% Scott Brison 4%
Forum Research	April 26, 2012	PDF	1,744	4%	—	8%	3%	—	5%	3%	6%	—	18%	17%	Don't know 42%
Forum Research	February 6, 2012	PDF	736	5%	—	12%	6%	—	7%	4%	6%	—	33%	26%	—
Forum Research	January 13, 2012	PDF	1,211	4%	—	9%	4%	—	5%	3%	—	—	21%	—	Don't know 46% Dalton McGuinty 4% Naheed Nenshi 4%

=== Liberal supporters only ===
Polling firm	Last date of polling	Link	Sample size	Mark Carney	Deborah Coyne	Ken Dryden	Marc Garneau	Martha Hall Findlay	Gerard Kennedy	Dominic LeBlanc	David McGuinty	Joyce Murray	Bob Rae	Justin Trudeau	Other/ Undecided
Forum Research	January 17, 2013	PDF	367	—	1%	—	6%	3%	—	—	—	3%	—	63%	Don't know 16% None of these 4% Martin Cauchon 2% George Takach 2%
Forum Research	December 18, 2012	PDF	337	—	1%	—	16%	3%	—	—	—	1%	—	63%	Don't know 11% None of these 3% David Bertschi 1% George Takach 1%
Léger Marketing	December 6, 2012	PDF	248	—	1%	—	20%	2%	—	—	—	0%	—	60%	Don't know 16% David Merner 1% David Bertschi 0% Alex Burton 0% Karen McCrimmon 0% Jonathan Mousley 0% René Roy 0% George Takach 0%
Forum Research	June 15, 2012	PDF	333	—	—	—	6%	4%	5%	4%	9%	—	—	33%	Don't know 26; John Manley 7% Scott Brison 6%
Forum Research	April 26, 2012	PDF	365	4%	—	7%	2%	—	8%	1%	2%	—	30%	24%	Don't know 21%
Forum Research	February 6, 2012	PDF	221	4%	—	5%	3%	—	5%	3%	9%	—	40%	30%	—
Forum Research	January 13, 2012	PDF	223	12%	—	9%	8%	—	7%	6%	—	—	47%	—	Dalton McGuinty 8% Naheed Nenshi 3%
Léger Marketing	September 15, 2011	HTML	243	—	—	—	—	—	5%	4%	—	—	19%	21%	Jean Charest 6% Denis Coderre 3%

== See also ==
- 2013 Ontario Liberal Party leadership election
- 2013 Quebec Liberal Party leadership election
- 2013 Liberal Party of Newfoundland and Labrador leadership election
