= Chungsen Leung =

Businessman

- 梁中心
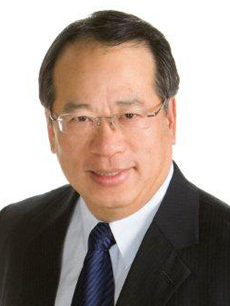

Member of Parliament for Willowdale
- In office May 2, 2011 – October 19, 2015
- Preceded by: Martha Hall Findlay
- Succeeded by: Ali Ehsassi

Personal details
- Born: July 14, 1950 (age 76) Taipei, Taiwan
- Party: Conservative
- Education: Carleton University; University of Southern California

Chungsen (C. S.) Leung (Chinese: 梁中心) (born July 14, 1950) is a Taiwanese-born Canadian businessman and Conservative politician who was formerly the MP for Willowdale. After his election in the 2011 federal election, Leung was appointed as the Parliamentary Secretary for Multiculturalism, a role he held until his defeat in the 2015 federal election.

== Early life and education ==
Chungsen Leung was born in Taipei, Taiwan on July 14, 1950. He pursued his secondary education in Japan. As the international community gradually recognized the mainland People's Republic of China in the 1960s, he feared that he could become stateless as a person born in Taiwan. He immigrated to Canada in 1968, where he received a Bachelor of Arts (B.A.) in economics and business at Carleton University. Leung later earned a Master of Science (M.Sc.) in Management and Engineering from the University of Southern California.

== Business career ==
Leung is an entrepreneur with business experiences in disaster mitigation management, urban mass transit projects, building environmentally friendly houses, air & water purification systems, sports equipment retailing and red deer farming. Chungsen also has business experience in the tourism and hospitality sector.

He was a business owner and chief executive officer of four Richmond Hill small and medium size enterprises, as well as, a past director and audit chair of the Xenos Group, a Toronto Stock Exchange listed public company in software development and engineering, and a director with Active Growth Capital.

His international business experience includes being a member of numerous federal and provincial trade missions during the last two decades; the Toronto-Chongqing Sister City Twinning Mission; organizing the 1st Team Richmond Hill Mission to Asia Pacific; Richmond Hill – Shijiazhuang Sister City Twinning Mission, a member of the Advisory Board for Ontario Export Inc. and the bid team leader to host the 1997 World Chinese Entrepreneur Convention in Toronto.

Leung has been: founding president of the Richmond Hill & Markham Chinese Business Association, a corporate cabinet director of the Conservation Foundation of Greater Toronto, a member of the Richmond Hill Naturalist, a director of the Richmond Hill Chamber of Commerce and numerous other bi-lateral trade or business related associations.

Leung is a director of the York Central Hospital Foundation, and a director of the Toronto Regional Conservation Authority Foundation.

== Politics ==
Before becoming the Conservative Party candidate in 2011, he was the party's candidate for Richmond Hill in the 2008 federal election, losing to Liberal candidate Bryon Wilfert. He was also the candidate for Willowdale representing the Progressive Conservative Party of Canada in the 2000 federal election, losing to Liberal candidate Jim Peterson.

Leung was elected to the House in 2011 as the MP for Willowdale, and has served as the Parliamentary Secretary for Multiculturalism since May 25, 2011. During a meeting organized by The Association of North American Ethnic Journalists & Writers in January 2015, Leung was questioned over the closure of the Canadian embassy in Iran and was recorded saying: "Let me ask you, if you like Iran so much, then why do you come to Canada?" during a heated exchange. Although Leung's staff indicated that this could have been the result of a miscommunication during cross-talk, it was a comment which angered some of those present, and Leung sent an email statement shortly after the incident stating that it was not his "intention to offend anyone. I regret if some attendees felt offended."

Leung was defeated in the 2015 federal election by Liberal candidate Ali Ehsassi.

== Personal life ==
Chungsen Leung is married to Deborah Chute, and together they have one child, Elysia. He has lived in the Willowdale riding for over two decades.

Leung trained to play the bagpipes at Cape Breton's Gaelic College after becoming enamored with the instrument during a family vacation to Scotland. Leung played two times for Queen Elizabeth II: once in 2002 for her Ontario Golden Jubilee celebrations and again in 2004, when he was asked to play for her in her summer retreat at Balmoral Castle. Leung also played the bagpipes for Prince William, Duke of Cambridge and Catherine, Duchess of Cambridge during their 2011 royal tour of Canada.

Chungsen Leung is a cross country skier, a scuba instructor, an Eagle Scout and the Parliamentary Liaison to Scouts Canada.

In 2003, Leung and his wife, Deborah Chute, received five national "Green" awards for building their energy efficient and environmentally friendly house in Richmond Hill. These awards are: Enerquality Corporation for a super R-2000 house, Canadian Mortgage and Housing Corporation for a healthy home, Canadian Home Builder Association for best environmental practices, Enbridge for low gas consumption guarantee, and Enerwork for being one of the first to use solar energy heating.

== Electoral record ==
2015 Canadian federal election
Party	Candidate	Votes	%	±%	Expenditures
Liberal	Ali Ehsassi	24,519	53.4	+13.5	–
Conservative	Chungsen Leung	16,990	37.0	-4.7	–
New Democratic	Pouyan Tabasinejad	3,203	7.0	-11.4	–
Green	James Arruda	1,025	2.2	+1.81	–
Independent	Birinder Singh Ahluwalia	216	0.5	–	–
Total valid votes/Expense limit		45,953	100.0		$206,712.87
Total rejected ballots		251	0.5	-0.1	
Turnout		46,204	61.46	+3.06	
Eligible voters		75,172			
Liberal gain from Conservative		Swing		+9.1	
Source: Elections Canada

2011 Canadian federal election
Party	Candidate	Votes	%	±%	Expenditures
Conservative	Chungsen Leung	22,207	41.7	+9.2	
Liberal	Martha Hall Findlay	21,275	39.9	-8.8	
New Democratic	Mehdi Mollahasani	9,777	18.4	+8.2	
Total valid votes/Expense limit		53,259	100.0		
Total rejected ballots		295	0.6	+0.2	
Turnout		53,554	58.4	+6.5	
Eligible voters		91,631	–	–	
Conservative gain from Liberal		Swing		+9.0	
