= Martha Hall Findlay =

Canadian politician

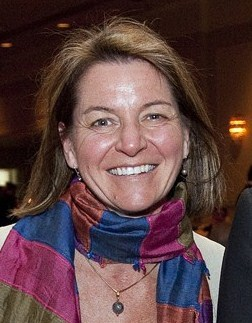
- Findlay in 2011

Member of Parliament for Willowdale
- In office 17 March 2008 – 2 May 2011
- Preceded by: Jim Peterson (2007)
- Succeeded by: Chungsen Leung

Personal details
- Born: Martha Hall; 17 August 1959 (age 67) Toronto, Ontario, Canada
- Party: Liberal
- Profession: Businesswoman; entrepreneur; lawyer; politician

Martha Hall Findlay (born 17 August 1959) is a Canadian businesswoman, entrepreneur, lawyer and politician who is now the Director and James S. and Barbara A. Palmer Chair at the School of Public Policy (University of Calgary). She previously served as the president and CEO of the Canada West Foundation, a Calgary-based think tank, and as senior vice-president and Chief Sustainability Officer with Suncor Energy. Previously, she was elected to the House of Commons of Canada as the Liberal Party of Canada's candidate in the Toronto riding of Willowdale in a federal by-election held on 17 March 2008, to fill a vacancy created by former Liberal MP Jim Peterson's resignation. She was re-elected in the 2008 general election but lost her seat in the 2011 election.

She had previously been the party's candidate for Newmarket—Aurora in the 2004 federal election, losing narrowly to Conservative candidate Belinda Stronach, and the first declared candidate for the Liberal Party leadership election to succeed Paul Martin in 2006. She was also an unsuccessful candidate in the 2013 leadership race.

== Early life and career ==
Born in Toronto, Hall Findlay lived in York Mills, attending the Toronto French School until Grade 8 when she was 13 and her parents separated. She moved with her mother to Thornbury, at the base of the Blue Mountains, east of Owen Sound. She skipped three grades (9, 10 and 11) to enter Grade 12 at Georgian Bay Secondary School in Meaford, and graduated from high school at 15.

Hall Findlay was overall silver medallist in the 1976 Canadian Ski Championship, and was named to the national training squad before retiring from competition to concentrate on her education. She graduated in international relations from the University of Toronto, and in law from Osgoode Hall Law School at York University. Through university, she worked as a waitress, carpenter and ski race coach; while completing law school, she co-owned and operated two retail stores, living above the Yonge St. store.

While in the International Relations Program she married Doug Findlay and, in her second year in 1981, gave birth to her first child, Katie. At Osgoode Hall Law School she had two more children, Everett in 1983 and Patrick in 1985, receiving her LL.B. in 1987. At the same time her mother went back for her university degree at age 60.

In Hall Findlay's professional career she worked for six years practicing corporate and commercial law at the Toronto offices of international law firm Baker McKenzie (then known as Baker & Mckenzie), served as general counsel and executive for Bell Mobility and Mobility Canada, and later served as vice-president and general counsel for The Rider Group. After moving to Collingwood, Ontario in 1996, she founded The General Counsel Group, a legal and management consulting firm working primarily in the high-tech and telecommunications fields in Canada and Europe. In 2007, she joined the law firm of Gowlings Lafleur Henderson LLP as counsel. After losing her seat in the 2011 election Hall Findlay became the chief legal officer at EnStream LP and an Executive Fellow at the University of Calgary’s School of Public Policy.

== Political career ==
In the 2004 federal election, the presumptive Liberal Party candidate in the riding of Newmarket—Aurora bowed out, not wanting to run for the scandal-plagued Liberal Party. Hall Findlay, still residing in Collingwood, was parachuted into the riding to challenge Conservative candidate Belinda Stronach, a wealthy local executive nationally famous for her candidacy in the Conservative leadership election earlier that year. While Stronach was thought to have a large lead on election night Hall Findlay came within 687 votes of winning the seat. Hall Findlay was so dedicated to winning the seat in the next election, she moved to the riding and was acclaimed as the Liberal candidate for the new election. However, on 17 May 2005, Stronach crossed the floor to join the Liberal Party caucus, and Hall Findlay stepped down as the candidate to allow Stronach to run under the Liberal banner. With nominations closed in other Toronto area ridings she was not a candidate in the 2006 election.

=== 2006 Leadership bid ===
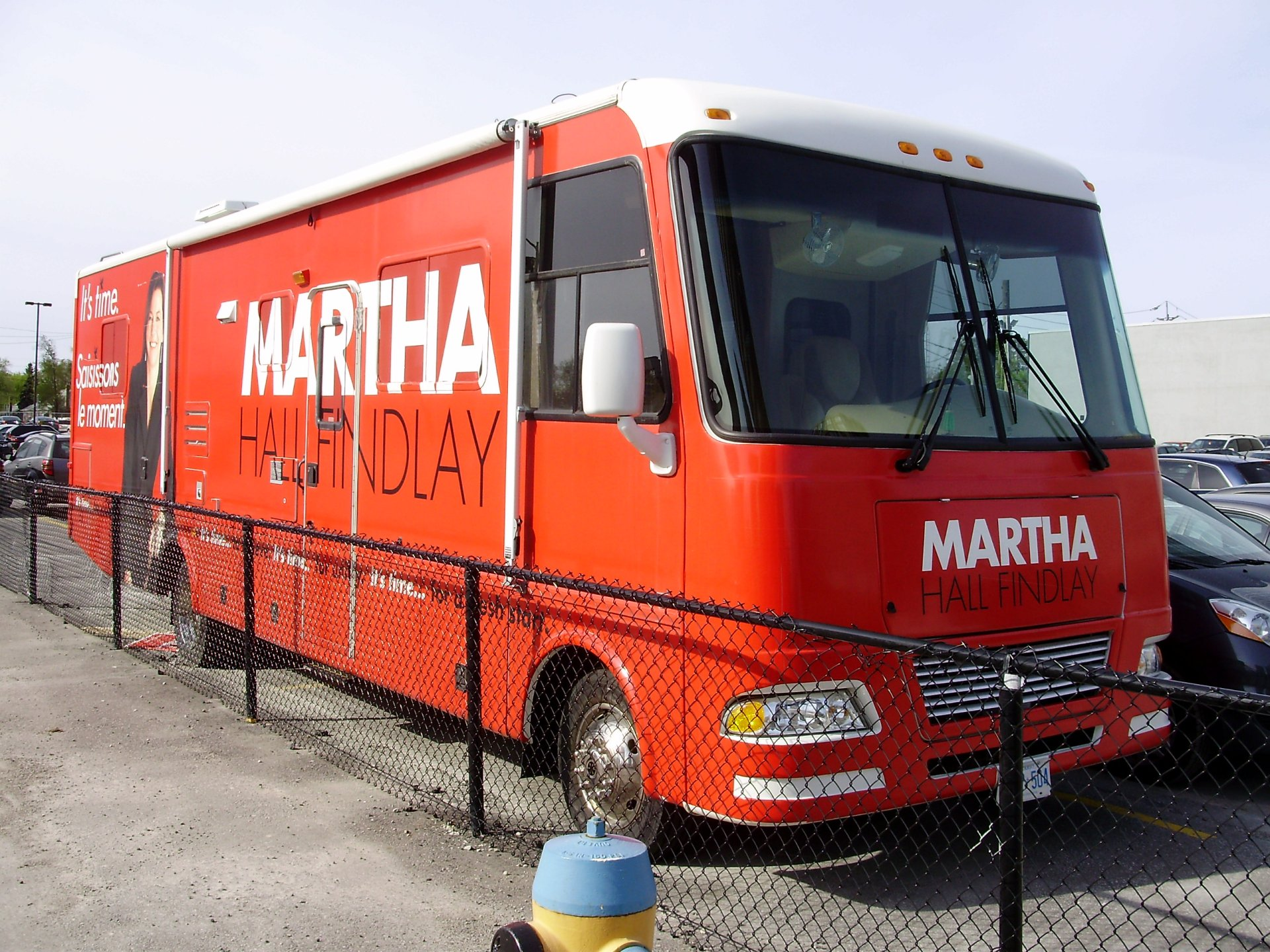
Martha Hall Findlay's Big Red Bus.

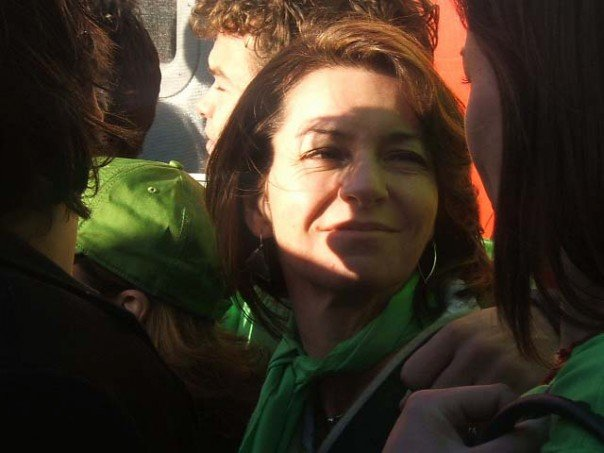
Martha Hall Findlay on the morning of the last day of the Liberal Leadership race, having just endorsed Dion.

The Liberal Party was defeated in the 2006 election and Paul Martin announced his intentions to step down as leader of the Liberal Party. On 8 February 2006, Hall Findlay became the first declared candidate for the Liberal Party leadership election to succeed Paul Martin. As the lowest profile of the candidates she jokingly referred to herself as "Martha Who Who". Hall Findlay made up for her lack of profile with an ambitious grassroots campaign that also included driving across the country in a motor home, which became known as the "big red bus". She described herself as fiscally conservative, socially progressive and the candidate who could bridge the gap between the Jean Chrétien and Paul Martin factions of the party. Political commentator Chantal Hébert wrote that out of the three women vying for the leadership, former cabinet ministers Carolyn Bennett and Hedy Fry dropped out mid-campaign, Hall Findlay "is the only one who has the necessary language credentials and the presence that front-line politicians are made of." Her two key issues in the race were the environment and health care. She believed that the Kyoto climate change protocol was worth pursuing and favoured private health care, but from a universal, single-tier and publicly funded system. Towards the end of the campaign Hall Findlay was endorsed by York West Member of Parliament Judy Sgro, she was the only member of the Liberal caucus to endorse Hall Findlay's candidacy. Along with Stéphane Dion she also received a newspaper endorsement from the Toronto Sun. Hall Findlay finished last on the first ballot with 2.7% of the vote and threw her support behind eventual winner Dion.

On 18 December 2006, Dion appointed Hall Findlay as the party's platform outreach chair. In her role she traveled across the country engaging Canadians on ideas for the party's election platform.

=== Willowdale MP ===
Hall Findlay was appointed as the Liberal candidate in the Toronto riding of Willowdale by Dion in 2007, after Liberal MP Jim Peterson announced he would not seek re-election. Willowdale was considered to be one of the Liberal Party's safest seats in the country and Hall Findlay's victory was almost guaranteed. Only months after announcing he would not seek re-election Peterson resigned from parliament, leading to a by-election to be held on 17 March 2008. Findlay faced Conservative candidate Maureen Harquail, NDP candidate Rini Ghosh, and Green Party candidate Lou Carcasole. On by-election night, Hall Findlay won nearly 60 per cent of the popular vote. Later that year she was re-elected in the general election, though her share of the popular vote fell below 49 per cent.

Dion resigned as Liberal leader in October 2008, following the party's poor showing the general election weeks prior. Hall Findlay was mentioned as a potential candidate for the leadership of the party, but announced in November that she would not be seeking the leadership. Outstanding debt from her leadership bid, as well as from the by-election and general election factored into her reason for not seeking the leadership. In December 2008 leadership candidates Dominic LeBlanc and Bob Rae dropped out of the race and Michael Ignatieff was acclaimed as party leader. Under Dion and Ignatieff she held several important Critic positions in the Official Opposition: Associate Finance; Transport, Infrastructure and Communities; Public Works and Government Services, and International Trade. With the Liberal Party finishing behind the Conservatives and NDP for the first time in the 2011 federal election Hall Findlay was narrowly defeated in her own riding by Conservative Chungsen Leung.

=== 2013 leadership bid ===
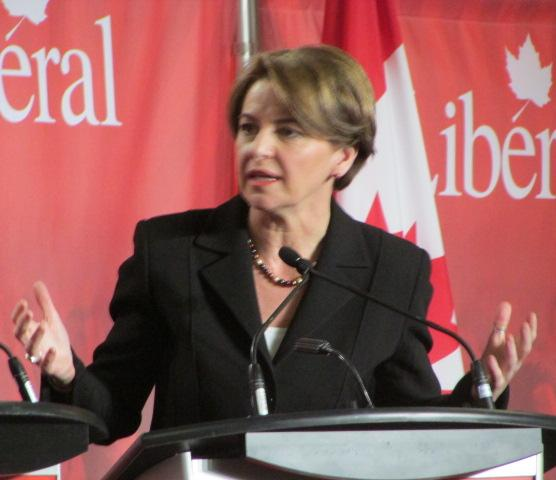
Hall Findlay during a candidates debate on 16 February 2013, in Mississauga

Ignatieff resigned as leader following the party's showing in the 2011 election. Despite her defeat in that election, Hall Findlay made no secret of her interest in seeking the leadership of the party in the 2013 leadership race. However, with outstanding debt from her 2006 leadership bid, Hall Findlay stated that she would not run for leader until that debt was paid off. In October 2012, she announced that she had paid off the remainder of the debt and on 14 November 2012, she announced her candidacy for the leadership of the Liberal Party. While Justin Trudeau was widely viewed as the frontrunner in the race, Hall Findlay was considered among the top-tier of candidates. On 14 April 2013, she lost the leadership election to Montreal MP Justin Trudeau.

In June 2012, as an Executive Fellow with the School of Public Policy at the University of Calgary, Hall Findlay, released a paper that called for an end to the supply management system in Canada's dairy, poultry and egg sectors. At the launch of her leadership bid on 14 November 2012, she stated that with the exception of "some politicians and dairy farmers" the reaction to her proposal to abolish supply management had been "overwhelmingly positive." Hall Findlay also announced she would be releasing policy papers every few weeks of the five month race, her first policy proposal called for a national energy strategy for energy infrastructure.

According to Elections Canada, Hall Findlay's campaign brought in $149,877.45 in donations in the fourth quarter of 2012, originally believed to be second only to Justin Trudeau who brought in $673,156.53. However, a discrepancy involving money raised to pay off her leadership debt from the 2006 races appears to have slid her into third behind Marc Garneau. Hall Findlay's campaign was managed by Stephen Carter, who managed the Calgary Mayoral campaign of Naheed Nenshi and the Alberta PC campaign under leader Alison Redford.

== Post-political career ==
After her 2011 election loss, Hall Findlay moved to Calgary where she became an Executive Fellow with the School of Public Policy at the University of Calgary. From 2011 to 2016, she was also the chief legal officer at EnStream. From 2016 to 2019, Hall Findlay was president and CEO of the Canada West Foundation think tank. In 2020, she joined Suncor as Chief Sustainability Officer.

== Community involvement ==
Hall Findlay has served as an executive of the Alberta radio network CKUA, the Couchiching Institute on Public Affairs, and the Georgian Bay Association. She is a past president of the Pointe au Baril Islanders' Association and the Georgian Peaks Club, and was an active member of the York Region Community Foundation.

== Electoral record ==
Willowdale

2011 Canadian federal election
Party	Candidate	Votes	%	±%	Expenditures
Conservative	Chungsen Leung	22,206	41.7	+9.2	
Liberal	Martha Hall Findlay	21,245	39.9	-8.8	
New Democratic	Mehdi Mollahasani	9,780	18.4	+8.2	
Total valid votes/Expense limit		53,259	100.0		
Total rejected ballots		295	0.6	+0.2	
Turnout		53,554	58.4	+6.5	
Eligible voters		91,631	–	–	

Willowdale

2008 Canadian federal election
Party	Candidate	Votes	%	±%	Expenditures
Liberal	Martha Hall Findlay	23,889	48.7	−10.6	$47,844.17
Conservative	Jake Karns	15,931	32.5	+2.4	$75,479.99
New Democratic	Susan Wallace	5,011	10.2	+5.4	$8,175.95
Green	Lou Carcasole	3,130	6.4	+0.6	$4,270.98
Progressive Canadian	Bahman Roudgarnia	864	1.8	–	$4,500
Independent	Bernadette Michael	260	0.5		$421.93
Total valid votes/Expense limit		49,085	100.0	$94,573.51	
Total rejected ballots		203	0.4		
Turnout		49,288	51.9		

Willowdale

By-election on 17 March 2008
Party	Candidate	Votes	%	±%
Liberal	Martha Hall Findlay	13,524	59.3	+7.1
Conservative	Maureen Harquail	6,864	30.1	+0.8
Green	Lou Carcasole	1,325	5.8	+1.7
New Democratic	Rini Ghosh	1,084	4.8	-16.2
Total valid votes		22,797	100.0	$
Liberal hold		Swing	+3.1	

2004 Canadian federal election: Newmarket—Aurora
Party	Candidate	Votes	%	±%
Conservative	Belinda Stronach	21,818	42.42	−2.43
Liberal	Martha Hall Findlay	21,129	41.08	−9.48
New Democratic	Ed Chudak	5,111	9.93	+6.18
Green	Daryl Wyatt	2,298	4.47	
Progressive Canadian	Dorian Baxter	1,079	2.10	–
Total valid votes		51,435	100.00	–
Change is from redistributed 2000 results. Conservative change is from the total of Canadian Alliance and Progressive Conservative votes.
