= Bob Jarvis (politician) =

Canadian politician

Robert Jarvis

Member of Parliament for Willowdale
- In office 22 May 1979 – 18 February 1980
- Preceded by: Riding established
- Succeeded by: Jim Peterson

Personal details
- Born: 15 November 1935 Ottawa, Ontario, Canada
- Died: 14 December 2017 (aged 82) Richmond Hill, Ontario, Canada
- Party: Progressive Conservative
- Profession: Lawyer

Robert E. Jarvis (15 November 1935 – 14 December 2017) was a Canadian Progressive Conservative member of the House of Commons of Canada. He was a lawyer by career. He was the first graduate of the University of Alberta Law School to have his degree recognized by the Ontario Law Society.

He represented Ontario's Willowdale electoral district which he won in the 1979 federal election. He sat in the 31st Canadian Parliament, during which he served as Parliamentary Secretary. He lost his seat in the 1980 federal election to Liberal challenger Jim Peterson.

After his political career, he became chairman of the Canada Mortgage and Housing Corporation (CMHC) in May 1985. He died on 14 December 2017.
