= Ali Ehsassi =

Canadian politician

The Honourable Ali Ehsassi PC MP
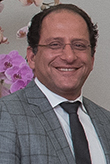
- Ehsassi on May 23, 2017.

Parliamentary Secretary to the Minister responsible for Canada-U.S. Trade, Intergovernmental Affairs, and One Canadian Economy
- Incumbent
- Assumed office June 5, 2025

Minister of Government Transformation, Public Services and Procurement Receiver General for Canada
- In office March 14, 2025 – May 13, 2025
- Prime Minister: Mark Carney
- Preceded by: Jean-Yves Duclos
- Succeeded by: Joël Lightbound

Member of Parliament for Willowdale
- Incumbent
- Assumed office October 19, 2015
- Preceded by: Chungsen Leung

Personal details
- Born: April 24, 1970 (age 56) Geneva, Switzerland
- Party: Liberal
- Relatives: Abdolhossein Teymourtash (great-grandfather)
- Education: University of Toronto; Osgoode Hall Law School; Georgetown University; London School of Economics
- Profession: Lawyer, International Law Executive of the Ontario Bar Association

Ali Cyrus Ehsassi MP (Persian: علی احساسی; born April 24, 1970) is a Canadian politician of Iranian descent who has served as the Liberal Member of Parliament for Willowdale since 2015. He was briefly the minister of government transformation, public services and procurement from March 14, 2025, to May 13, 2025.

== Biography ==
Ehsassi was born on April 24, 1970, in Geneva, Switzerland. At the age of three, his family relocated to New York City and by age 15, Ehsassi moved to North York, Ontario, with his family.

Ehsassi's extended family has extensive experience in international relations. His maternal great-grandfather was Iranian statesman Abdolhossein Teymourtash, who was the first Minister of Court during the Pahlavi dynasty. Ehsassi's father was also an Iranian diplomat and worked in Iran's embassy in Switzerland when he was born. His family left Iran during the Iranian Revolution.

== Education ==
Ehsassi holds a Bachelor of Arts degree from the University of Toronto and a Master's of Science degree from the London School of Economics. He attended York University Osgoode Hall Law School having obtained his LL.B. Ehsassi then went on to Georgetown University Law School to pursue a masters of international trade and arbitration law, which he attended concurrently as a global and WTO fellow.

== Member of Parliament ==
Ehsassi has served as the Liberal Member of Parliament for Willowdale since 2015. He was one of the first two Canadians of Iranian heritage elected to federal Parliament.

Ehsassi is the chair of the All-Party Parliamentary Group for the Prevention of Genocide and other Crimes against Humanity, Co-Chair of the 416 Caucus, is on the Standing Committee for Citizenship and Immigration, and the Standing Joint Committee for the Scrutiny of Regulations.

He is also a member of several Parliamentary Associations and Interparliamentary groups such as the Canada-Africa Parliamentary Association, Canada-China Legislative Association Canada-Israel Interparliamentary Group, Canada-United Kingdom Inter-Parliamentary Association, Canada-United States Inter-Parliamentary Group, Canadian Group of the Inter-Parliamentary Union, Canadian NATO Parliamentary Association and the Canadian Section of ParlAmericas.

He notably opposes the Iranian government and called for a public inquiry into potential Iranian interference in Canadian elections.

In the 2025 Liberal Party of Canada leadership election, he endorsed Mark Carney. He joined Carney's 30th Canadian Ministry as Minister of Government Transformation, Public Services and Procurement in March. After being reelected in the 2025 federal election in April, Elhassi was appointed as Parliamentary Secretary to the President of the King’s Privy Council for Canada and Minister responsible for Canada-U.S. Trade, Intergovernmental Affairs and One Canadian Economy.

== Electoral record ==
2025 Canadian federal election: Willowdale
** Preliminary results — Not yet official **
| Party | Candidate | Votes | % | ±% | Expenditures |
|---|---|---|---|---|---|
| Liberal | Ali Ehsassi | 25,487 | 53.45 | +2.26 | |
| Conservative | James Lin | 20,915 | 43.86 | +10.00 | |
| New Democratic | Christy Kheirallah | 1,286 | 2.70 | –7.59 | |
| Total valid votes/expense limit | | | | | |
| Total rejected ballots | | | | | |
| Turnout | | 47,688 | 60.63 | | |
| Eligible voters | | 78,656 | | | |
| Liberal hold | | Swing | | –3.87 | |
Source: Elections Canada

2021 Canadian federal election
| Party | Candidate | Votes | % | ±% | Expenditures |
|---|---|---|---|---|---|
| Liberal | Ali Ehsassi | 21,043 | 51.2 | +2.2 | $98,989.39 |
| Conservative | Daniel Lee | 13,916 | 33.9 | -2.3 | $70,040.08 |
| New Democratic | Hal Berman | 4,231 | 10.3 | +1.0 | $2,471.22 |
| People's | Al Wahab | 1,102 | 2.7 | +1.5 | $1,784.10 |
| Green | Anna Gorka | 812 | 2.0 | -1.7 | $1,462.34 |
| Total valid votes/Expense limit | | 41,104 | 99.1 | – | $108,952.94 |
| Total rejected ballots | | 383 | 0.9 | | |
| Turnout | | 41,487 | 54.8 | | |
| Eligible voters | | 75,773 | | | |
| Liberal hold | | Swing | | +2.3 | |
Source: Elections Canada

2019 Canadian federal election: Willowdale
| Party | Candidate | Votes | % | ±% | Expenditures |
|---|---|---|---|---|---|
| Liberal | Ali Ehsassi | 22,282 | 49.0 | -4.4 | $103,868.26 |
| Conservative | Daniel Lee | 16,452 | 36.2 | -0.8 | $82,193.67 |
| New Democratic | Leah Kalsi | 4,231 | 9.3 | +2.3 | none listed |
| Green | Sharolyn Vettese | 1,671 | 3.7 | +1.5 | $0.00 |
| People's | Richard Hillier | 563 | 1.2 | - | $1,005.61 |
| Independent | Birinder Singh Ahluwalia | 200 | 0.4 | -0.1 | none listed |
| Independent | Shodja Ziaian | 71 | 0.2 | - | none listed |
| Total valid votes/expense limit | | 45,470 | 100.0 | | |
| Total rejected ballots | | 410 | | | |
| Turnout | | 45,880 | 58.2 | | |
| Eligible voters | | 78,809 | | | |
| Liberal hold | | Swing | | -1.80 | |
Source: Elections Canada

2015 Canadian federal election
| Party | Candidate | Votes | % | ±% | Expenditures |
|---|---|---|---|---|---|
| Liberal | Ali Ehsassi | 24,519 | 53.4 | +13.5 | $89,151.49 |
| Conservative | Chungsen Leung | 16,990 | 37.0 | -4.7 | $135,960.85 |
| New Democratic | Pouyan Tabasinejad | 3,203 | 7.0 | -11.4 | $6,678.16 |
| Green | James Arruda | 1,025 | 2.2 | +1.81 | $7,484.51 |
| Independent | Birinder Singh Ahluwalia | 216 | 0.5 | – | $39,117.06 |
| Total valid votes/Expense limit | | 45,953 | 100.0 | | $207,725.33 |
| Total rejected ballots | | 251 | 0.5 | -0.1 | |
| Turnout | | 46,204 | 61.46 | +3.06 | |
| Eligible voters | | 75,172 | | | |
| Liberal gain from Conservative | | Swing | | +9.1 | |
Source: Elections Canada
