= EnStream =

EnStream LP is a mobile commerce joint venture company owned by Bell Mobility, Rogers and TELUS—Canada's three main wireless companies. The three carriers formed EnStream LP in 2005. EnStream provides digital identity verification and authentication services for 3rd party applications, enhancing user convenience and reducing identity theft and fraud. EnStream formerly managed a mobile money transfer service called Zoompass.

== Uses of EnStream API's ==
- Contact Number Verification
- Fraud Detection
- Instant Account Opening
- Anti Money Laundering Compliance
- Geo-restricted Service Verification
- Transport and Logistics Services

== Awards ==
Year	Nominee / work	Award	Result
2010	Enstream LP - Zoompass	Canadian Innovation Award for Mobile Application	Won
2011	Enstream LP - Zoompass Mobile Wallet & Prepaid MasterCard Program	Best Consumer Value in Prepaid - Paybefore Awards	Won

EnStream divested Zoompass in 2012.
