= Willowdale (federal electoral district) =

Federal electoral district in Ontario, Canada

Coordinates: 43.778°N 79.416°W

Ontario electoral district
- Interactive map of riding boundaries from the 2015 federal election

Federal electoral district
- Legislature: House of Commons
MP
Ali Ehsassi
Liberal
- District created: 1976
- First contested: 1979
- Last contested: 2021
- District webpage: profile, map

Demographics
- Population (2021): 118,218
- Electors (2021): 76,164
- Area (km²): 19.75
- Pop. density (per km²): 5,985.7
- Census division: Toronto
- Census subdivision: Toronto (part)

Willowdale is a federal electoral district in Toronto, Ontario, Canada. It has been represented in the House of Commons of Canada since 1979. It is the riding with the biggest Korean community in Canada. As per the 2021 census, 9.9% of the population of Willowdale is Korean.

For a long time this riding was considered a Liberal stronghold, having been won by the Liberal Party of Canada in all but one election since 1980. Longtime Liberal MP Jim Peterson was the riding's MP from 1980 to 1984 and from 1988 to 2007, and Martha Hall Findlay was the riding MP from 2008 to 2011. However, Conservative candidate Chungsen Leung won by 932 votes on the May 2, 2011 federal election. In the 2015 federal election, the seat returned to the Liberal Party with Ali Ehsassi unseating Leung. This district is home to some landmarks like Mel Lastman Square, the Toronto Centre for the Arts and the Claude Watson School for the Arts.

== Geography ==
The riding contains the neighbourhoods of Willowdale, Lansing, Newtonbrook and North York Centre.

== Demographics ==
According to the 2021 Canadian census; 2013 representation

Languages: 29.4% English, 12.3% Mandarin, 9.2% Iranian Persian, 8.3% Korean, 6.7% Yue, 4% Russian, 3.2% Tagalog, 1.8% Spanish, 1.3% Arabic, 1.1% Italian, 1% Hindi, 1% Persian
Religions: 38.6% No religion, 38.5% Christian (17.5% Catholic, 3.9% Christian Orthodox, 2% Presbyterian, 1.3% Anglican, 1% United Church), 10.9% Muslim, 4.5% Jewish, 4% Hindu, 2.5% Buddhist
Median income (2020): $37,200
Average income (2020): $55,050

As per the 2021 Census, Willowdale has highest percentage of ethnic Iranians (8.9%) and ethnic Koreans (9.4%) of all City of Toronto ridings, and is one of the only four ridings with Chinese being the most frequent ethnic origin. In the same vein, it is the City of Toronto riding with the highest percentage of people belonging to the West Asian (11%) and Korean (9.9%) visible minorities.

Ethnicity groups: White: 28.7%, Chinese: 25.3%, West Asian: 11%, Korean: 9.9%, South Asian: 7.6%, Filipino: 6.5%, Black: 2.4%, Latin American: 2%, Arab: 1.4%, Southeast Asian: 1.3%

Ethnic origins: Chinese 22.9%, Korean 9.4%, Iranian 8.9%, Filipino 5.9%, Indian 4.8%, English 3.9%, Russian 3.8%, Italian 3.5%, Irish 3.4%, Canadian 3.2%

== History ==
The riding was created in 1976 from part of Eglinton, York North and York Centre.

Willowdale consisted initially of the part of the Borough of North York bounded on the north by the borough limit (Steeles Avenue), on the West by the West Branch of the Don River and Bathurst Street, on the south by Highway 401, and on the east by Bayview Avenue.

In 1987, it was redefined to consist of the part of the City of North York bounded on the north by the borough limits (Steeles Avenue), and on the east, south and west by a line drawn from the borough limit southeast along the Don River West Branch, south along Bayview Avenue, east along Finch Avenue East, south along the Don River East Branch, west along Highway 401, and northwest along the Don River West Branch to the borough limit.

In 1996, it was redefined to consist of the part of the City of North York bounded on the north by the borough limits (Steeles Avenue), and on the east, south and west by a line drawn from the borough limit south along the eastern limit of the city, west along the hydro-electric transmission line situated south of McNicoll Avenue, south along Highway 404, west along Finch Avenue East, south along the Don River East Branch, west along Highway 401, northwest along the Don River West Branch, north along Bathurst Street, east along Drewry Avenue, north along Chelmsford Avenue, west along Greenwin Village Road, and north along Village Gate to the northern city limit.

In 2003, it was redefined to consist of that part of the City of Toronto described as follows: commencing at the intersection of the northerly limit of said city with Victoria Park Avenue; thence southerly along said avenue to the hydroelectric transmission line situated northerly of Apache Trail; thence southwesterly along said transmission line to Highway No. 404; thence southerly along said highway to Finch Avenue East; thence generally westerly along said avenue to Leslie Street; thence southerly along said street to Highway No. 401; thence generally southwesterly along said highway to the Don River West Branch; thence generally northwesterly along said branch to Bathurst Street; thence northerly along said street to the hydroelectric transmission line situated northerly of Finch Avenue West; thence generally easterly along said transmission line to Yonge Street; thence northerly along said street to the northerly limit of said city; thence easterly along said limit to the point of commencement.

This riding lost territory (36%) to Don Valley North, and gained territory from York Centre (16%) during the 2012 electoral redistribution. The reduction in land area of the riding was primarily facilitated by substantial population growth along Yonge Street where the on-going redevelopment of land into additional high-rise residential buildings continued with medium-density development (low-rise residential buildings and townhomes) occurring slightly further from Yonge Street and along Sheppard and Finch Avenues. The portion of the City of Toronto north of Highway 401 and east of Victoria Park Avenue (the former boundary with Scarborough) was allocated an additional riding now having five ridings versus the previous four.

=== Former boundaries ===
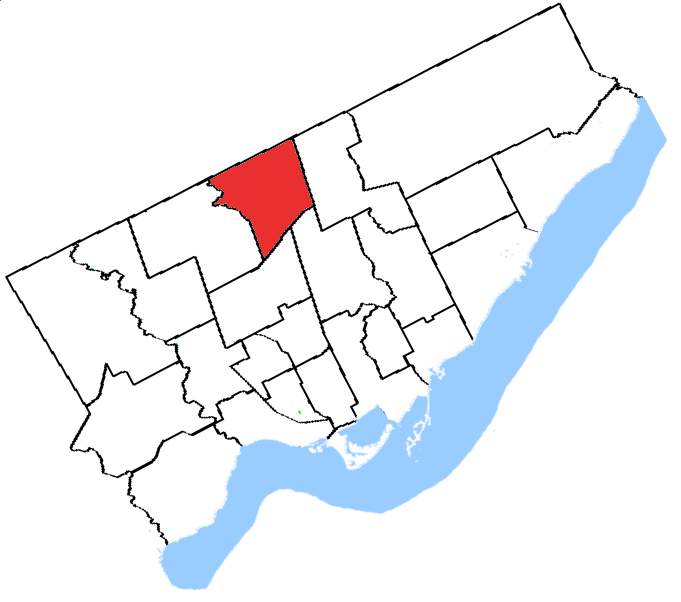
1976 to 1987

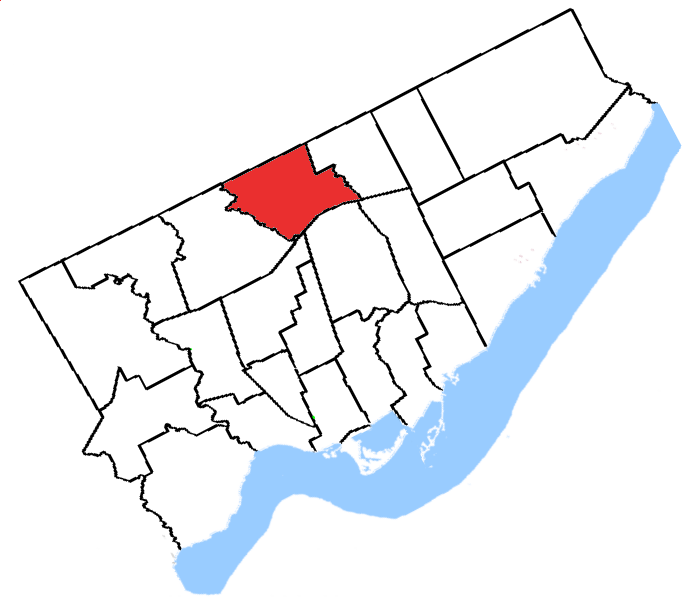
1987 to 1996

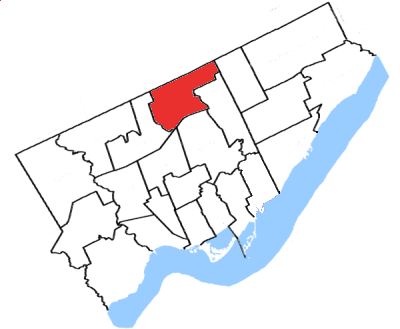
1996 to 2003

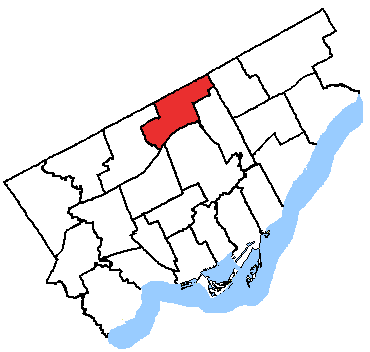
2003 to 2015

== Members of Parliament ==
This riding has elected the following members of Parliament:

Parliament	Years	Member	Party
Willowdale; Riding created from Eglinton, York North and York Centre
31st	1979–1980	Bob Jarvis	Progressive Conservative
32nd	1980–1984	Jim Peterson	Liberal
33rd	1984–1988	John Oostrom	Progressive Conservative
34th	1988–1993	Jim Peterson	Liberal
35th	1993–1997	Jim Peterson	Liberal
36th	1997–2000	Jim Peterson	Liberal
37th	2000–2004	Jim Peterson	Liberal
38th	2004–2006	Jim Peterson	Liberal
39th	2006–2007	Jim Peterson	Liberal
39th	2008–2008	Martha Hall Findlay	Liberal
40th	2008–2011	Martha Hall Findlay	Liberal
41st	2011–2015	Chungsen Leung	Conservative
42nd	2015–2019	Ali Ehsassi	Liberal
43rd	2019–2021	Ali Ehsassi	Liberal
44th	2021–2025	Ali Ehsassi	Liberal
45th	2025–present	Ali Ehsassi	Liberal

== Election results ==
Graph of election results in Willowdale (minor parties that never got 2% of the vote or didn't run consistently are omitted)

2025 Canadian federal election
** Preliminary results — Not yet official **
Party	Candidate	Votes	%	±%	Expenditures
Liberal	Ali Ehsassi	25,487	53.45	+2.26	
Conservative	James Lin	20,915	43.86	+10.00	
New Democratic	Christy Kheirallah	1,286	2.70	–7.59	
Total valid votes/expense limit					
Total rejected ballots					
Turnout		47,688	60.63		
Eligible voters		78,656			
Liberal hold		Swing		–3.87	
Source: Elections Canada

2021 Canadian federal election
Party	Candidate	Votes	%	±%	Expenditures
Liberal	Ali Ehsassi	21,043	51.2	+2.2	$98,989.39
Conservative	Daniel Lee	13,916	33.9	-2.3	$70,040.08
New Democratic	Hal Berman	4,231	10.3	+1.0	$2,471.22
People's	Al Wahab	1,102	2.7	+1.5	$1,784.10
Green	Anna Gorka	812	2.0	-1.7	$1,462.34
Total valid votes/Expense limit		41,104	99.1	–	$108,952.94
Total rejected ballots		383	0.9		
Turnout		41,487	54.8		
Eligible voters		75,773			
Liberal hold		Swing		+2.3	
Source: Elections Canada

2019 Canadian federal election
Party	Candidate	Votes	%	±%	Expenditures
Liberal	Ali Ehsassi	22,282	49.0	-4.4	$103,868.26
Conservative	Daniel Lee	16,452	36.2	-0.8	$82,193.67
New Democratic	Leah Kalsi	4,231	9.3	+2.3	none listed
Green	Sharolyn Vettese	1,671	3.7	+1.5	$0.00
People's	Richard Hillier	563	1.2	-	$1,005.61
Independent	Birinder Singh Ahluwalia	200	0.4	-0.1	none listed
Independent	Shodja Ziaian	71	0.2	-	none listed
Total valid votes/expense limit		45,470	100.0		
Total rejected ballots		410			
Turnout		45,880	58.2		
Eligible voters		78,809			
Liberal hold		Swing		-1.80	
Source: Elections Canada

2015 Canadian federal election
Party	Candidate	Votes	%	±%	Expenditures
Liberal	Ali Ehsassi	24,519	53.4	+13.5	$89,151.49
Conservative	Chungsen Leung	16,990	37.0	-4.7	$135,960.85
New Democratic	Pouyan Tabasinejad	3,203	7.0	-11.4	$6,678.16
Green	James Arruda	1,025	2.2	+1.81	$7,484.51
Independent	Birinder Singh Ahluwalia	216	0.5	–	$39,117.06
Total valid votes/Expense limit		45,953	100.0		$207,725.33
Total rejected ballots		251	0.5	-0.1	
Turnout		46,204	61.46	+3.06	
Eligible voters		75,172			
Liberal gain from Conservative		Swing		+9.1	
Source: Elections Canada

2011 federal election redistributed results
Party	Vote	%
Conservative	16,168	41.47
Liberal	15,280	39.20
New Democratic	7,383	18.94
Green	152	0.39

2011 Canadian federal election
Party	Candidate	Votes	%	±%	Expenditures
Conservative	Chungsen Leung	22,207	41.7	+9.2	
Liberal	Martha Hall Findlay	21,275	39.9	-8.8	
New Democratic	Mehdi Mollahasani	9,777	18.4	+8.2	
Total valid votes/Expense limit		53,259	100.0		
Total rejected ballots		295	0.6	+0.2	
Turnout		53,554	58.4	+6.5	
Eligible voters		91,631	–	–	
Conservative gain from Liberal		Swing		+9.0	

2008 Canadian federal election
Party	Candidate	Votes	%	±%	Expenditures
Liberal	Martha Hall Findlay	23,889	48.7	-10.6	$47,844.17
Conservative	Jake Karns	15,931	32.5	+2.4	$75,479.99
New Democratic	Susan Wallace	5,011	10.2	+5.4	$8,175.95
Green	Lou Carcasole	3,130	6.4	+0.6	$4,270.98
Progressive Canadian	Bahman Roudgarnia	864	1.8	–	$4,500
Independent	Bernadette Michael	260	0.5		$421.93
Total valid votes/Expense limit		49,085	100.0	$94,573.51	
Total rejected ballots		203	0.4		
Turnout		49,288	51.9		

By-election on March 17, 2008
Party	Candidate	Votes	%	±%
Liberal	Martha Hall Findlay	13,524	59.3	+7.1
Conservative	Maureen Harquail	6,864	30.1	+0.8
Green	Lou Carcasole	1,325	5.8	+1.7
New Democratic	Rini Ghosh	1,084	4.8	-6.6
Total valid votes		22,797	100.0	$
Liberal hold		Swing	+3.1	

2006 Canadian federal election
Party	Candidate	Votes	%	±%	Expenditures	
Liberal	Jim Peterson	30,623	55.2	-6.2	$77,156	
Conservative	Jovan Boseovski	16,254	29.3	+6.2		$81,690
New Democratic	Rochelle Carnegie	6,297	11.4	+1.8	$12,532	
Green	Sharolyn Vettese	2,268	4.1	+0.4		$5,067
Total valid votes		55,442	100.0			
Total rejected ballots		216	0.4			
Turnout		55,658	62.8			
Liberal hold		Swing	-7.7			

2004 Canadian federal election
Party	Candidate	Votes	%	±%
Liberal	Jim Peterson	30,855	61.4	+0.1
Conservative	Jovan Boseovski	11,615	23.1	-9.9
New Democratic	Yvonne Bobb	4,812	9.6	+4.2
Green	Sharolyn Vettese	1,844	3.7	
Progressive Canadian	Ardavan Behrouzi	883	1.8	
Independent	Bernadette Michael	253	0.5	
Total valid votes		50,262	100.0	

Note: Conservative vote is compared to the total of the Canadian Alliance vote and Progressive Conservative vote in 2000 election.

2000 Canadian federal election
Party	Candidate	Votes	%	±%
Liberal	Jim Peterson	27,038	61.3	+3.0
Alliance	Kevyn Nightingale	7,411	16.8	+4.0
Progressive Conservative	Chungsen Leung	7,134	16.2	-5.3
New Democratic	Yvonne Bobb	2,404	5.4	-0.6
Marxist–Leninist	Roger Carter	145	0.3	
Total valid votes		44,132	100.0	

Note: Canadian Alliance vote is compared to the Reform vote in 1997 election.

1997 Canadian federal election
Party	Candidate	Votes	%	±%
Liberal	Jim Peterson	27,311	58.3	-2.8
Progressive Conservative	Norm Gardner	10,043	21.4	+4.8
Reform	Peter Cobbold	6,007	12.8	-2.4
New Democratic	Mikael Swayze	2,833	6.0	+2.4
Natural Law	Don Murray	268	0.6	0.0
Independent	Paul Coulbeck	266	0.6	
Canadian Action	Randall Whitcomb	128	0.3	
Total valid votes		46,856	100.0	

1993 Canadian federal election
Party	Candidate	Votes	%	±%
Liberal	Jim Peterson	28,372	61.0	+14.0
Progressive Conservative	John Oostrom	7,733	16.6	-26.7
Reform	Gerry Welbourn	7,052	15.2	
New Democratic	Mary Maron	1,682	3.6	-5.2
National	Shelley Goldstein	674	1.5	
Green	Tom Salsberg	461	1.0	
Natural Law	Mike Dubinsky	248	0.5	
Independent	Owen Smith	204	0.4	
Abolitionist	Jewel McKenzie	53	0.1	
Total valid votes		46,479	100.0	

1988 Canadian federal election
Party	Candidate	Votes	%	±%
Liberal	Jim Peterson	24,230	47.0	+4.2
Progressive Conservative	John Oostrom	22,347	43.4	-0.1
New Democratic	Anne Adelson	4,517	8.8	-4.3
Rhinoceros	Peeter Tammisto	268	0.5	
Libertarian	Hans Wienhold	147	0.3	-0.4
Total valid votes		51,509	100.0	

1984 Canadian federal election
Party	Candidate	Votes	%	±%
Progressive Conservative	John Oostrom	22,425	43.5	+6.1
Liberal	Jim Peterson	22,063	42.8	-4.6
New Democratic	John Fagan	6,711	13.0	-1.7
Libertarian	George Graham	329	0.6	+0.3
Total valid votes		51,528	100.0	

1980 Canadian federal election
Party	Candidate	Votes	%	±%
Liberal	Jim Peterson	22,235	47.4	+7.5
Progressive Conservative	Bob Jarvis	17,527	37.4	-7.4
New Democratic	Bob Hebdon	6,889	14.7	+0.4
Libertarian	Shannon Vale	170	0.4	-0.4
Marxist–Leninist	Rae Greig	46	0.1	0.0
Total valid votes		46,867	100.0	

1979 Canadian federal election
Party	Candidate	Votes	%
Progressive Conservative	Bob Jarvis	22,238	44.8
Liberal	Jim Peterson	19,848	40.0
New Democratic	Chris Thurrott	7,128	14.3
Libertarian	Robert Austin Leber	391	0.8
Marxist–Leninist	Rae Greig	71	0.1
Total valid votes		49,676	100.0

== Student vote results ==
2025 Willowdale student vote
43.04%	37.39%	19.57%
Liberal	Conservative	NDP

== See also ==
- List of Canadian electoral districts
- Historical federal electoral districts of Canada
