= Jim Peterson =

Canadian politician (1941–2024)

The Honourable Jim Peterson PC
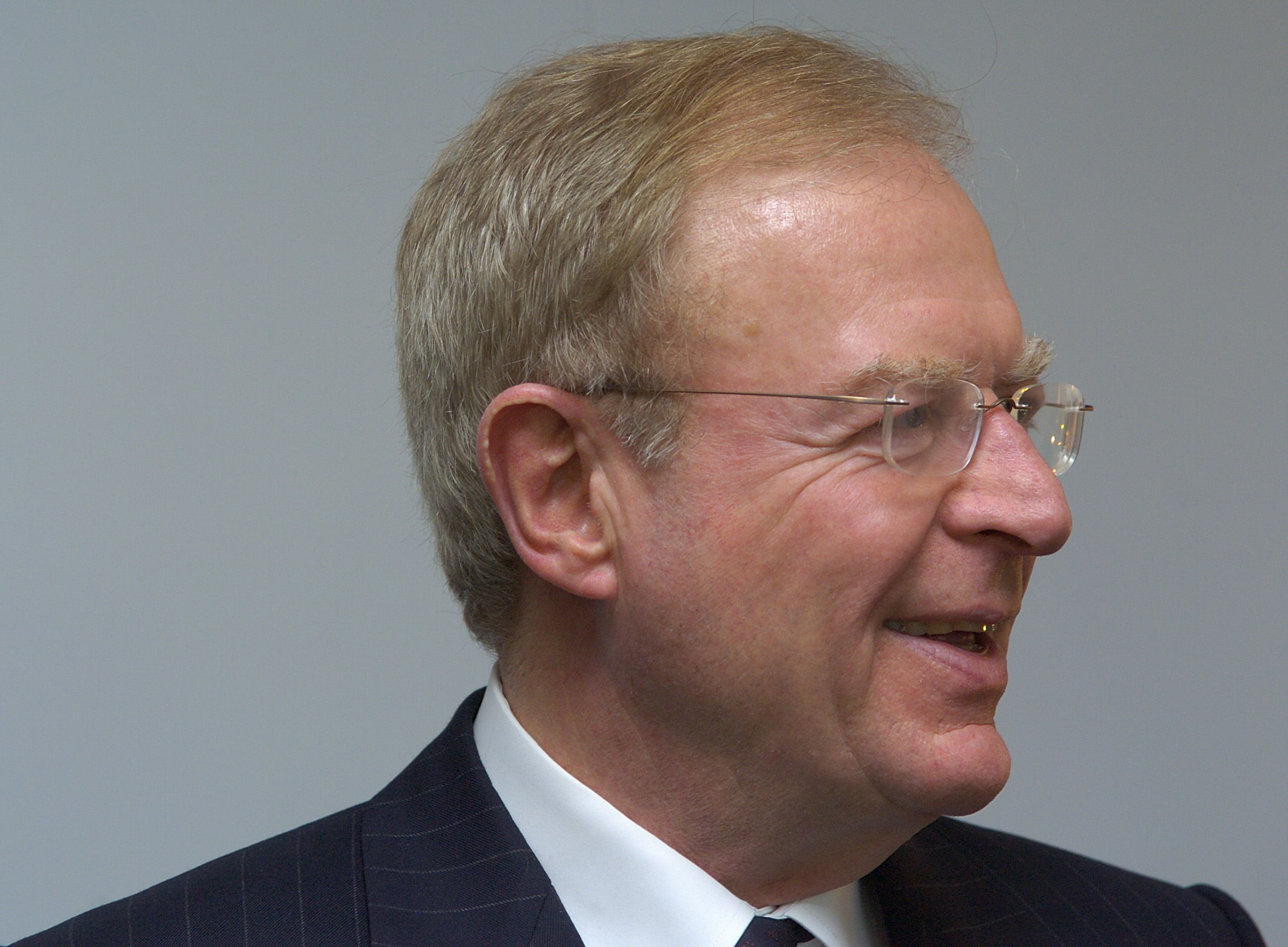
- Jim Peterson in 2004

Minister for International Trade
- In office December 12, 2003 – February 5, 2006
- Prime Minister: Paul Martin
- Preceded by: Pierre Pettigrew
- Succeeded by: David Emerson (International Trade)

Member of Parliament for Willowdale
- In office November 21, 1988 – July 12, 2007
- Preceded by: John Oostrom
- Succeeded by: Martha Hall Findlay (2008)
- In office February 18, 1980 – September 4, 1984
- Preceded by: Bob Jarvis
- Succeeded by: John Oostrom

Personal details
- Born: James Scott Peterson; July 30, 1941 Ottawa, Ontario, Canada
- Died: May 10, 2024 (aged 82)
- Party: Liberal
- Spouse: Heather Johnston
- Relations: David Peterson (brother); Tim Peterson (brother)
- Profession: Lawyer

James Scott Peterson PC (July 30, 1941 – May 10, 2024) was a Canadian politician. He was a Liberal member of the House of Commons of Canada from 1980 to 1984 and again from 1988 to 2007, representing the northern Toronto riding of Willowdale. He served in the cabinets of Jean Chrétien, as Secretary of State (International Financial Institutions), and Paul Martin, as Minister of International Trade.

== Personal background ==
Born in Ottawa, Ontario, he had a Doctor of Civil Law in International Law from McGill University, a Master of Laws from Columbia University, and a Bachelor of Arts and a Bachelor of Laws from the University of Western Ontario. As well, he had diplomas from Hague Academy of International Law in The Hague and La Sorbonne in Paris.

Peterson was one of three sons of Clarence and Laura Marie Peterson, who were both from Saskatchewan. They moved to Ontario during the Great Depression where Clarence worked as a salesman for several years before establishing a wholesale electronics business, C.M. Peterson Co. Ltd, in 1944 in London. He was elected an alderman on London City Council in the early 1950s and was the provincial Liberal candidate in London North in 1955 against future Premier of Ontario John Robarts, and again as a federal Liberal candidate in 1963 in London.

Both of Jim Peterson's brothers entered politics; David Peterson served as premier of Ontario from 1985 to 1990, while Tim Peterson served as a member of the Legislative Assembly of Ontario from 2003 to 2007, first as a Liberal and later as a Progressive Conservative.

Peterson was married to Heather (née Johnston) Peterson, who served as a regional liaison officer in the Prime Minister's Office of Pierre Trudeau and as the national director of John Turner's successful 1984 leadership campaign. The couple were married for over 60 years, until his death, and first met in high school when they were 13 years old. They married when they were both 21. Peterson and his wife first came to public attention in 1974 when they helped ballet star Mikhail Baryshnikov defect from the Soviet Union during a performance of the Bolshoi Ballet in Toronto.

Prior to entering politics, Peterson practiced international law and taught at the University of Toronto Faculty of Law. He had also consulted for the United Nations Development Programme in Malaysia and Sudan.

== Politics ==
As a member of Parliament in the House of Commons he represented the riding of Willowdale in Toronto. Peterson ran as a candidate for the Liberal Party in the 1979 election but was defeated. He ran again in the 1980 election and won. He served as a backbencher under Pierre Trudeau and as a parliamentary secretary from 1981 to 1983. As parliamentary secretary to then justice minister Jean Chrétien, Peterson helped pass Criminal Code of Canada reforms that made it easier to prosecute sexual assault, allowed a victim's partner to be charged, and restricted the admissibility of a victim's sexual history in court, and ended the requirement that rape must be reported immediately as a requirement for charges to be laid.

He supported John Turner's successful bid to succeed Trudeau in the 1984 Liberal leadership contest (for which his wife Heather served as campaign director) but lost his seat in the 1984 election. He was returned to Parliament in the 1988 election and was re-elected in each subsequent election until his retirement in 2007.

Peterson was mentioned as a potential candidate during the 1990 Liberal leadership contest, but opted to support Paul Martin. When the Liberals returned to power under Jean Chrétien, Peterson served as the chair of the standing committee on Finance.

In 1997, Chrétien appointed him to the Ministry as the Secretary of State (International Financial Institutions), but Peterson was sent back to the backbench in 2002. He returned to serve in the cabinet of Paul Martin, whom Peterson had long supported.

Peterson was mentioned as a potential interim leader of the Liberal Party of Canada, following the resignation of Paul Martin; however, Bill Graham was named to the position. Peterson did not take a critic's portfolio in the Liberal Party's Shadow Cabinet formed by Graham or by Martin's permanent successor, Stéphane Dion. He and his brother David had supported Michael Ignatieff instead of Dion for the Liberal Party leadership in 2006, with Jim Peterson serving as Ignatieff's Ontario campaign co-chair with former DFAIT cabinet colleague Aileen Carroll.

On March 8, 2007, Peterson announced that he would not be a candidate in the next federal election. Former Liberal Party of Canada leadership candidate Martha Hall Findlay was appointed as the Liberal candidate in his riding. On June 20, 2007, he announced his resignation from the House of Commons, which took effect July 2.

== Post political life ==
On November 20, 2007, Peterson joined the international law firm of Fasken Martineau DuMoulin as counsel. The following month, Ontario's Minister of Economic Development and Trade Sandra Pupatello appointed Peterson as Ontario's chief negotiator in the Quebec/Ontario trade, investment and labour mobility negotiations. In 2017, Ontario's Natural Resources Minister, Kathryn McGarry, appointed Peterson as Ontario's chief negotiator in the ongoing softwood lumber dispute between Canada and the United States.

Peterson died from a heart attack at his farm near Orangeville, Ontario, on May 10, 2024, at the age of 82.

27th Canadian Ministry (2003–2006) – Cabinet of Paul Martin
Cabinet post (1)
Predecessor	Office	Successor
Pierre Pettigrew	Minister of International Trade; 2003–2006	David Emerson
26th Canadian Ministry (1993–2003) – Cabinet of Jean Chrétien
Sub-Cabinet Post
Predecessor	Title	Successor
Douglas Peters	Secretary of State (International Financial Institutions) (1997–2002)	John McCallum
