= The Prince Arthur Herald =

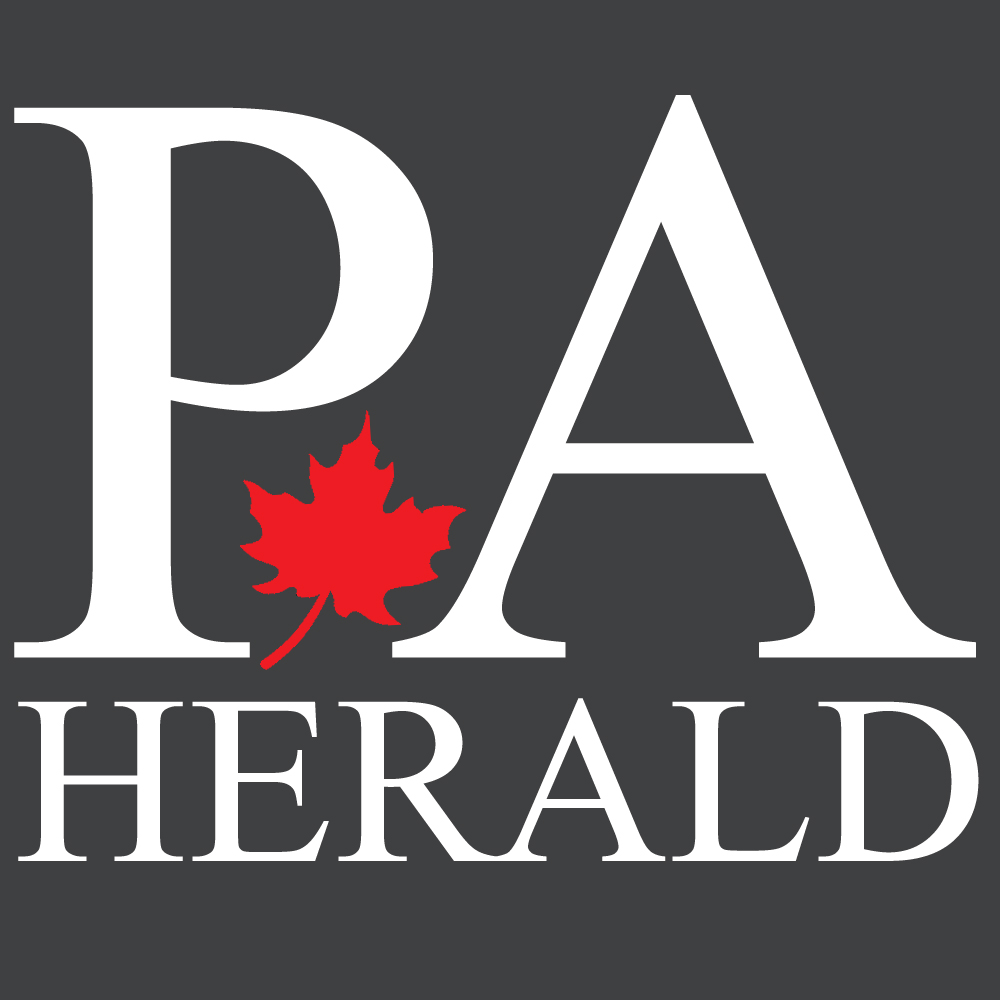
- Format: Online
- Owner(s): The Prince Arthur Herald, Ltd.
- Founded: 2011
- Political alignment: Centre-right, Conservative, Classical Liberal publisher = The Prince Arthur Herald, Ltd.
- Language: English, French
- Ceased publication: January 2019
- Headquarters: Montréal, Québec; Canada

The Prince Arthur Herald was a bilingual online student news blog based in Montreal, Quebec, Canada. It was founded by a group of students at McGill University in January 2011. The newspaper published new content daily using the voluntary contributions of a number of students, columnists and journalists in Montreal, Toronto, and across Canada. It ceased publication in 2019.

== History ==
The Prince Arthur Herald was founded at the beginning of January 2011. It was named after Prince Arthur street in the Milton-Parc area.

The publication shut down at the start of January 2019.
