= National Security and Intelligence Committee of Parliamentarians =

Canadian federal government agency

- Comité des parlementaires sur la sécurité nationale et le renseignement

Agency overview
- Formed: 2018
- Jurisdiction: Oversight of intelligence services in Canada
- Headquarters: Ottawa, Ontario
- Employees: 10
- Annual budget: $3.5 million CAD
- Minister responsible: Mark Carney, Prime Minister of Canada
- Agency executives: Darren Fisher, Committee Chair; Rennie Marcoux, NSICOP Secretariat Executive Director
- Key document: National Security and Intelligence Committee of Parliamentarians Act
- Website: Official website

The National Security and Intelligence Committee of Parliamentarians (NSICOP; French: Comité des parlementaires sur la sécurité nationale et le renseignement; CPSNR) is a body composed of members of the House of Commons and Senate which reviews the activities of the Government of Canada's national security and intelligence agencies. The committee also performs strategic and systematic reviews of the legislative, regulatory, policy, expenditure and administrative frameworks under which national security activities are conducted.

Formed in 2017, members of NSICOP are appointed from members of Parliament's two chambers on the advice of the prime minister after consultation with the leader of the opposition party. Members must obtain and maintain top secret security clearance. NSICOP is not a standing committee nor a special committee of Parliament. Rather, it is an agency of the executive branch, itself overseen by the Prime Minister's Office, whose membership is made up of parliamentarians, unlike similar bodies in other Five Eyes countries – such as the Senate Intelligence Committee and House Permanent Select Committee on Intelligence in the United States, the Intelligence and Security Committee of Parliament in the United Kingdom or the Parliamentary Joint Committee on Intelligence and Security in Australia.

== Mandate ==
The NSICOP has a broad government-wide mandate to scrutinize any national security matter. The committee is empowered to perform reviews of national security and intelligence activities including ongoing operations, and strategic and systematic reviews of the legislative, regulatory, policy, expenditure and administrative frameworks under which these activities are conducted. It also conducts reviews of matters referred by a minister. The committee provides oversight to at least 17 federal agencies involved in security issues, including:

- Canadian Security Intelligence Service (CSIS)
- Communications Security Establishment (CSE)
- Royal Canadian Mounted Police (RCMP)
- Global Affairs Canada (GAC)
- Canada Border Services Agency (CBSA)
- Department of Finance Canada
- Department of Justice Canada
- Canadian Air Transport Security Authority (CATSA)
- Financial Transactions and Reports Analysis Centre of Canada (FINTRAC).

=== Collaboration with NSIRA ===
Established in 2019, the National Security and Intelligence Review Agency (NSIRA) reviews all national security and intelligence activities carried out by the Government of Canada. The NSICOP has a mandate to review the legislative, regulatory, policy, administrative and financial framework for national security and intelligence in Canada, as well as departmental activities related to national security and intelligence. NSICOP reviews tend to be more strategic than those of NSIRA, which undertakes detailed reviews of specific activities with a strong emphasis on legal compliance. In practice, the two review bodies complement each other and provide Canadians with comprehensive and multi-faceted scrutiny of the government's secret activities. NSIRA and the NSICOP may exchange classified information, and are required by statute to cooperate in order to avoid unnecessary duplication of effort.

=== Secretariat ===
The committee is supported by a secretariat with an executive director, who has the rank of a deputy minister.

=== Composition ===
The committee is a statutory committee made up of parliamentarians, but it is an independent agency whose members are appointed by and administratively housed within the executive branch rather than within the structures of Parliament. This structure is designed to give the committee a high-degree of independence and access to classified government information, while providing for necessary controls on the use and disclosure of this information.

The committee consists of a chair and ten other members, three from the Senate and seven from the House of Commons (with a maximum of five members from the House of Commons from the governing party). Members are appointed by the Governor in Council on the recommendation of the prime minister.

Committee members are required to obtain a Top Secret security clearance and swear an oath of secrecy before assuming their position on the committee, and they also must maintain the confidentiality of information they receive for the rest of their lives, and any breach will open the door to criminal prosecution under the Criminal Code. The act purports to limit parliamentary privilege, however section 12 of the statute, which imposed this restriction, was struck down by the Ontario Superior Court for being unconstitutional in 2022. This means a member who discloses classified information on the floor of the House or Senate can not be prosecuted.

== Formation and history ==
Until 2017, Canada was the only member of “Five Eyes” without a permanent mechanism for parliamentarians to review national security activities. Parliamentary scrutiny of intelligence functions had been raised as an issue with every evolution of the intelligence community since the 1979 Royal Commission of Inquiry into Certain Activities of the RCMP, known as the MacDonald Commission. Since that time, the landscape has shifted considerably both domestically and internationally. Since the events of September 11, 2001, there has been a substantial expansion in the breadth and intensity of Canada's counter-terrorism efforts. The Special Senate Committee on Anti-terrorism concluded, “Canada now lags significantly behind its allies on the issue of parliamentary oversight as the only country that lacks a parliamentary committee with substantial powers of review over matters of national security.”

In 2004, the Interim Committee of Parliamentarians on National Security was established to recommend a national security oversight mechanism. The committee's report, which was unanimously supported by the all-party membership, outlined the structure for a committee of parliamentarians. The committee found that "closer parliamentary scrutiny will better assure Canadians that a proper balance is being maintained between respect for their rights and freedoms, and the protection of national security." The committee recommended that "to allow more effective parliamentary scrutiny of the intelligence community, Parliament will require that some of its number have complete access to such classified information as they consider appropriate." The committee report recognized that "confidence between the intelligence community and the committee will be essential to the success of parliamentary scrutiny of intelligence functions"

Bill C-22, the National Security and Intelligence Committee of Parliamentarians Act was tabled by the government on June 16, 2016, and received Royal Assent on June 22, 2017. Trudeau announced the creation of the NSICOP on November 6, 2017.

=== Reports ===
==== Special Report on Foreign Interference in Canada's Democratic Processes and Institutions ====
In 2024 NSCIOP released a report on foreign interference in Canada's elections and society from September 2018 to 2024. It states that foreign interference as spreading disinformation that supported these foreign governments against "Canadian interests" while noting that the interference came from foreign states such as China, India, and Iran. Some of the interference that it identifies that these foreign powers interfered 2020 and 2022 Conservative Party of Canada leadership race, nomination races, that there were an unknown number of federal politicians who were willing to share secrets with foreign governments and media institutions in Canada where journalists were targeted in favour for favourable coverage of these foreign states. The interference was most done through person to person interactions but also use traditional and social media to conduct their interferences.

== Membership ==
As of the 45th Canadian Parliament:

=== Senate ===
Caucus	Senator	Province
Progressive Senate Group	Marty Klyne	SK
Conservative	Claude Carignan	QC
Canadian Senators Group	Rebecca Patterson	ON

=== House of Commons ===
Party	Member	District
Liberal	Darren Fisher, chair	Dartmouth—Cole Harbour, NS
Liberal	Greg Fergus	Hull—Aylmer, QC
Liberal	Ginette Petitpas Taylor	Moncton—Dieppe, NB
Liberal	Abdelhaq Sari	Bourassa, QC
Conservative	Alex Ruff	Bruce—Grey—Owen Sound, ON
Bloc Québécois	Rhéal Fortin	Rivière-du-Nord, QC
Conservative	Rob Morrison	Columbia—Kootenay—Southern Rockies, BC
Liberal	Iqwinder Gaheer	Mississauga—Malton, ON

== Criticism ==
Chair appointed by the prime minister

Under the NSICOP Act, the Committee chair is appointed directly by the Prime Minister. Previous National Security Committee recommendations, such as the 2004 Interim Committee of Parliamentarians on National Security insisted that, "committee leadership positions should be elected by a secret ballot of its members to enhance the reality, and perception, of committee independence."

In 2013, after public criticism, the British government significantly overhauled UK's Intelligence and Security Committee of Parliament, strengthening its powers and its independence. The committee emerged with an independently elected chair, operational oversight powers and a shift in appointment power from the prime minister to Parliament.

Access to information

The 2004 Interim Committee of Parliamentarians on National Security recommended granting the Parliamentary National Security Committee complete access to information. However, under the NSICOP Act, government ministers can refuse to provide certain types of operational information and information relating to ongoing operations if the minister determines disclosure “would be injurious to national security”. Opposition parties have argued that this undefined clause is "disturbingly wide" and allows the government abuse to cover up sloppy management, or a scandal within a department.

Vetting of reports

The committee's annual and special reports are vetted by the government before they are released, which some argue constrains the committee's ability to raise red flags with the public.

== See also ==
- Intelligence Commissioner of Canada
- National Security and Intelligence Review Agency
- Other Five Eyes oversight bodies
  - Intelligence and Security Committee of Parliament (United Kingdom)
  - Parliamentary Joint Committee on Intelligence and Security (Australia)
  - Intelligence and Security Committee (New Zealand)
  - United States Intelligence Community Oversight
