= Information Sharing Environment =

United States government program

The Information Sharing Environment (ISE) was established by the United States Intelligence Reform and Terrorism Prevention Act of 2004. Under Section 1016 of IRTPA, the Program Manager for the Information Sharing Environment (PM-ISE) was granted government wide authority to plan for, oversee the implementation of, and manage the ISE.

== Scope of the Information Sharing Environment ==
The ISE provides analysts, operators, and investigators with information needed to enhance national security. These analysts, operators, and investigators come from a variety of communities - law enforcement, public safety, homeland security, intelligence, defense, and foreign affairs – and may work for federal, state, local, tribal, or territorial governments. They also have mission needs to collaborate and share information with each other and with private sector partners and our foreign allies. Federal agencies and state, local, tribal, and private sector partners — the ISE Mission Partners — deliver, and operate, the ISE and are accountable for sharing to enable end-to-end mission processes that support counterterrorism.

== Role of the Office of the Program Manager for the ISE ==
The PM-ISE works with ISE Mission Partners to improve the management, discovery, fusing, sharing, delivery of, and collaboration around terrorism-related information. The primary focus is any mission process, anywhere in the United States, that is intended or is likely to have a material impact on detecting, preventing, disrupting, responding to, or mitigating terrorist activity. Examples include: terrorism watchlisting, person and cargo screening, suspicious activity reporting, and alerts, warnings and notifications. The PM-ISE facilitates the development of the ISE by bringing together mission partners and aligning business processes, standards and architecture, security and access controls, privacy protections, and best practices.

== Laws and Presidential Authorities Inclusive of IRTPA ==
The Uniting and Strengthening America by Providing Appropriate Tools Required to Intercept and Obstruct Terrorism (USA PATRIOT) Act of 2001 removed barriers that once restricted the sharing of information between the law enforcement and intelligence communities.

The Homeland Security Act of 2002 established the Department of Homeland Security (DHS) in part to improve the sharing of information among Federal, State, and local government agencies and the private sector, in order to enhance the Nation's ability to detect, identify, understand, and assess terrorist threats to and vulnerabilities of the homeland, to better protect our Nation's critical infrastructure, integrate our emergency response networks, and link State and Federal Governments. On July 29, 2003, the U.S. president issued Executive Order 13311, addressing key information sharing provisions in the Homeland Security Act.

The Intelligence Reform and Terrorism Prevention Act of 2004 (IRTPA) reorganized the Intelligence Community and established the position of Director of National Intelligence to serve as the U.S. President's chief intelligence advisor and the head of the Intelligence Community, and to ensure closer coordination and integration of the 16 agencies that make up the Intelligence Community. IRTPA also established the National Counterterrorism Center (NCTC) to serve as a multiagency center analyzing and integrating all intelligence pertaining to terrorism, including threats to U.S. interests at home and abroad.

Section 1016 of IRTPA embraced the key principles of Executive Order 13356 and directed the establishment of the Information Sharing Environment. The U.S. president was charged to create the ISE, designate its organization and management structure, and determine and enforce the policies and rules to govern the ISE's content and usage. The law further required the ISE be "a decentralized, distributed, and coordinated environment" that "to the greatest extent practicable ... connects existing systems ... builds upon existing systems capabilities currently in use across the Government ... facilitates the sharing of information at and across all levels of security ... and incorporates protections for individuals' privacy and civil liberties."

IRTPA required the U.S. president designate a Program Manager for the ISE. The role of the Program Manager is to manage the ISE, oversee its implementation, assist in the development of ISE standards and practices, and monitor and assess its implementation by federal departments and agencies. IRTPA also established an Information Sharing Council to advise the U.S. president and the Program Manager on the development of ISE policies, procedures, guidelines, and standards, and to ensure proper coordination among federal departments and agencies participating in the ISE. Under the Obama Administration, the Information Sharing Council has been integrated into the White House policy process through the Information Sharing and Access Interagency Policy Committee (IPC), so that the important work of the ISC will move forward under the auspices of the Executive Office of the President.

== Laws and Presidential Authorities Post-IRTPA ==
On August 27, 2004, in response to the Recommendations of the 9/11 Commission, the U.S. president issued Executive Order 13356, Strengthening the Sharing of Terrorism Information to Protect Americans. In it the U.S. president directed agencies to give the "highest priority" to the prevention of terrorism and the "interchange of terrorism information [both] among agencies" and "between agencies and appropriate authorities of States and local governments." The U.S. president further directed that this improved information sharing be accomplished in ways that "protect the freedom, information privacy, and other legal rights of Americans."

On October 25, 2005, the U.S. president issued Executive Order 13388, Further Strengthening the Sharing of Terrorism Information to Protect Americans, superseding Executive Order 13356, to facilitate the work of the Program Manager, expedite the establishment of the ISE, and restructure the Information Sharing Council.

On December 16, 2005, in accordance with section 1016 of the Intelligence Reform and Terrorism Prevention Act of 2004, the U.S. president issued a Memorandum to Heads of Executive Departments and Agencies prescribing the guidelines and requirements in support of the creation and implementation of the ISE. The Memorandum contained two requirements and five guidelines which prioritize efforts the U.S. president believes are most critical to the development of the ISE and assigned Cabinet officials responsibility for resolving some of the more complicated issues associated with information sharing.

The U.S. president directed that the ISE be established by building upon "existing Federal Government policies, standards, procedures, programs, systems, and architectures (collectively "resources") used for the sharing and integration of and access to terrorism-related information, and ... leverage those resources to the maximum extent practicable, with the objective of establishing a decentralized, comprehensive, and coordinated environment for the sharing and integration of such information." The U.S. President also directed the heads of executive departments and agencies to "actively work to create a culture of information sharing within their respective departments or agencies by assigning personnel and dedicating resources to terrorism-related information sharing, by reducing disincentives to such sharing, and by holding their senior managers accountable for improved and increased sharing of such information.".

Later, in August 2007, the Implementing Recommendations of the 9/11 Commission Act of 2007 included amendments to section 1016 of the Intelligence Reform and Terrorism Prevention Act of 2004 and to the Homeland Security Act of 2002. The new law expanded the scope of the ISE to explicitly include homeland security information and weapons of mass destruction information. It also endorses and formalizes many of the recommendations developed in response to the President's information sharing guidelines, such as the creation of the Interagency Threat Assessment and Coordination Group, and the development of a national network of State and major urban area fusion centers.

== Additional Information ==
- Documents Associated with the Information Sharing Environment
- PM-ISE's Public Remarks in October 2010 on the Information Sharing Environment's Efforts
