= Badge of the Communications Security Establishment =

Badge of the Communications Security Establishment

The badge of the Communications Security Establishment is the main heraldic emblem of the Communications Security Establishment (CSE).

== History ==
In response to a request from the Chief of the Communications Security Establishment, a warrant authorizing the creation of a badge was signed by the Deputy Herald Chancellor of the Canadian Heraldic Authority (at that time, Lieutenant-General James Cyrille Gervais), on January 26, 1994. The CSE badge was granted by the Chief Herald of Canada, under the authority of the Governor General (at that time, Raymon John Hnatyshyn), on July 15, 1994, to mark the 48th anniversary of the organization's founding; it was officially presented to the Chief on October 19, 1994.

The badge is registered in the Public Register of Arms, Flags and Badges of Canada, Vol. II, page 326. The notice of registration was published in Part I of the Canada Gazette, Vol. 128, No. 49, page 4584, on December 3, 1994.

In CSE's 2025-2026 Annual Report,, an updated version of the badge was used, showing the Canadian Royal Crown.

== Description ==
The Letters Patent issued by the Canadian Heraldic Authority describes the badge as: Azure a bezant charged with a maple leaf Gules thereon a key palewise wards upward to the dexter its bow enfiled by two lightning flashes in saltire Or the whole within an annulus Or fimbriated and inscribed NUNTIUM COMPARAT ET CUSTODIT in letter Azure and ensigned by a representation of the Royal Crown.

== Significance ==
According to information provided by the Canadian Heraldic Authority, use of the Royal Crown was approved by the Queen on or about July 7, 1994. The blue circle represents the world of information, while the gold circle and maple leaf symbolize Canada. The lightning flashes denote communications, while the key represents the secure and sensitive nature of the information which CSE provides and protects. The motto is a Latin translation of the phrase "Providing and Protecting Information".

== Pennant ==
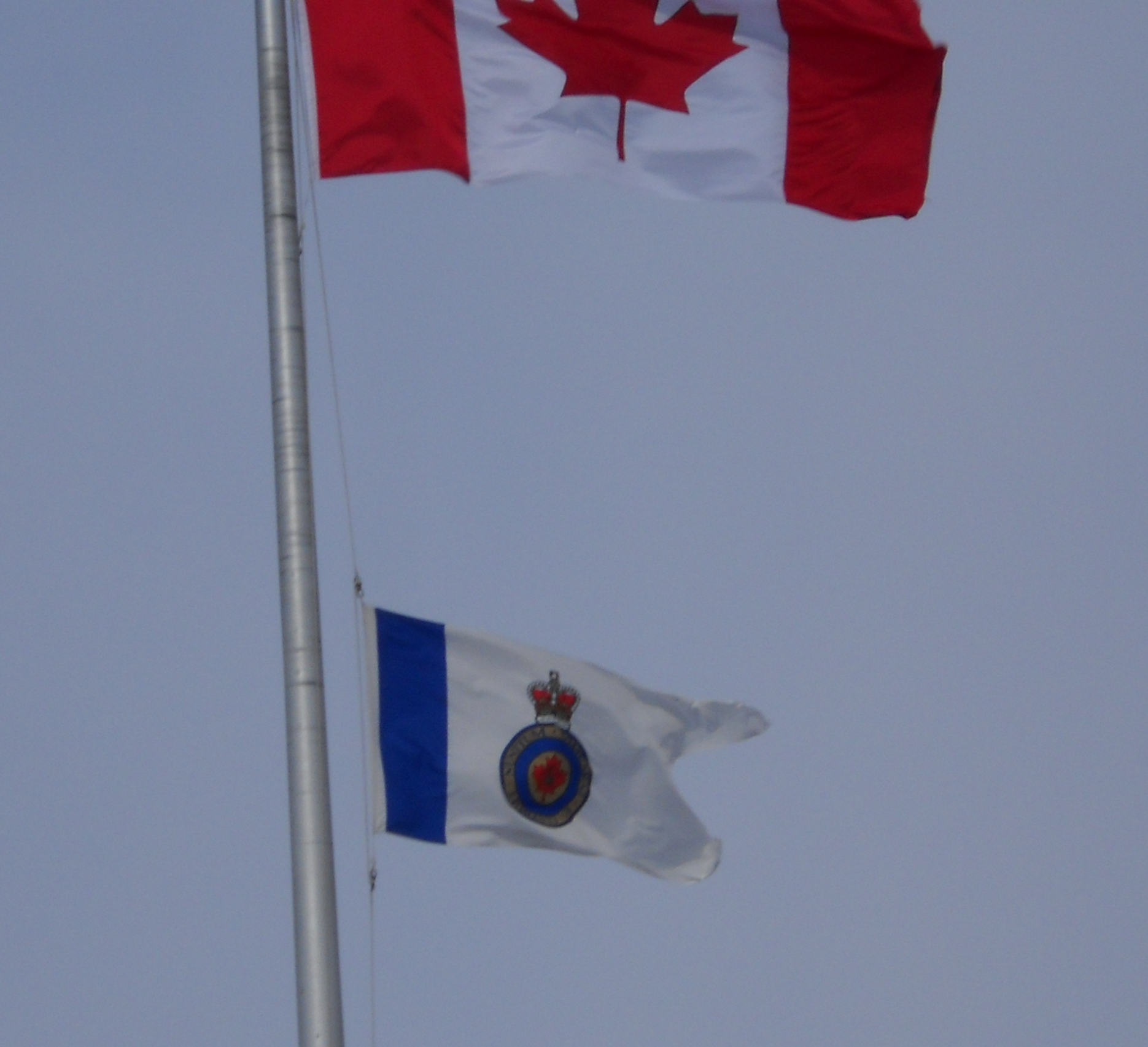
The CSE pennant flying in front of the Sir Leonard Tilley Building

As part of the organization's 50th anniversary, a swallowtail pennant bearing CSE's heraldic badge was introduced. The pennant was first raised by the Chief of CSE on September 6, 1996, during a noon ceremony at the Sir Leonard Tilley Building. Since then, the pennant was flown at each of CSE's buildings, beneath the Canadian flag. It now flies on its own pole next to the Canadian flag, at the new Edward Drake Building.

== See also ==
- Communications Security Establishment
- Canadian royal symbols
