= Scott Jones =

Scott Jones may refer to:

- Scott Jones (athlete) (born 1998), British shot putter
- Scott Jones (curler) (born 1971), Canadian curler
- Scott Jones (American football) (born 1966), American football offensive tackle
- Scott Jones (Australian footballer) (born 1995), Australian rules footballer for Fremantle
- Scott Jones (English footballer) (born 1975), English football defender
- Scott Jones (Puerto Rican footballer) (born 1983), American soccer midfielder
- Scott J. Jones (born 1954), American theologian and bishop of the United Methodist Church
- Scott A. Jones, founder of ChaCha search engine
- Scott C. Jones, American writer and television presenter focused on video games and technology
- Scott Jones (sheriff) (born 1967), sheriff of Sacramento County, California
- Scott Jones (filmmaker), Canadian writer and filmmaker
- Scott Jones (Canadian civil servant), appointed in 2018 to head the Canadian Center for Cyber Security
