= Leonard Tilley =

Leonard Tilley may refer to:

== People ==
- Samuel Leonard Tilley (1818-1896), Canadian politician, Father of Confederation
- Leonard Percy de Wolfe Tilley (1870-1947), 21st Premier of New Brunswick, Canada

== Other ==
- Sir Leonard Tilley Building, office building in Ottawa, Canada
