= United States Intelligence Community =

Collective term for US federal intelligence and security agencies

- Seal of the US Intelligence Community

- Flag of the US Intelligence Community

Agency overview
- Formed: December 4, 1981; 44 years ago
- Agency executive: Jay Clayton, Director of National Intelligence
- Key document: Executive Order 12333
- Website: intelligence.gov

The United States Intelligence Community (IC) is a group of U.S. federal government intelligence agencies and subordinate organizations that conduct intelligence activities to support the foreign policy and national security interests of the United States. The group includes intelligence agencies, military intelligence, and civilian intelligence and analysis offices within federal executive departments.

The IC is overseen by the Office of the Director of National Intelligence (ODNI), which is led by the director of national intelligence (DNI), who reports directly to the president of the United States. The IC was established by Executive Order 12333 ("United States Intelligence Activities"), signed on December 4, 1981, by President Ronald Reagan. The statutory definition of the IC, including its roster of agencies, was codified as the Intelligence Organization Act of 1992 (Pub. L. 102–496, H.R. 5095, 106 Stat. 3188).

In 2010, The Washington Post reported that 1,271 government organizations and 1,931 private companies in 10,000 locations in the United States were working on counterterrorism, homeland security, and intelligence; about 854,000 people held top-secret clearances.

== Etymology ==
The term intelligence community was first used during Walter Bedell Smith's tenure as director of central intelligence (1950–1953).

== History ==
Intelligence is information that agencies collect, analyze, and distribute in response to government leaders' questions and requirements. Intelligence is a broad term that may entail for example:

Collection, analysis, and production of sensitive information to support national security leaders, including policymakers, military commanders, and members of Congress. Safeguarding these processes and this information through counterintelligence activities. Execution of covert operations approved by the president. The IC strives to provide valuable insight on important issues by gathering raw intelligence, analyzing that data in context, and producing timely and relevant products for customers at all levels of national security—from the war-fighter on the ground to the president in Washington.

Executive Order 12333 charged the IC with six primary objectives:

- Collection of information needed by the president, the National Security Council, the secretary of state, the secretary of defense, and other executive branch officials for the performance of their duties and responsibilities;
- Production and dissemination of intelligence;
- Collection of information concerning, and the conduct of activities to protect against, intelligence activities directed against the US, international terrorist and/or narcotics activities, and other hostile activities directed against the US by foreign powers, organizations, persons and their agents;
- Special activities (defined as activities conducted in support of US foreign policy objectives abroad which are planned and executed so that the "role of the United States Government is not apparent or acknowledged publicly", and functions in support of such activities, but which are not intended to influence United States political processes, public opinion, policies, or media and do not include diplomatic activities or the collection and production of intelligence or related support functions);
- Administrative and support activities within the United States and abroad necessary for the performance of authorized activities and
- Such other intelligence activities as the president may direct from time to time.

Before the CIA's establishment, several military intelligence agencies, and the FBI to a limited extent, fulfilled its role.

== Organization ==
Seal of the Office of the Director of National Intelligence

The IC is headed by the director of national intelligence (DNI), whose statutory leadership is exercised through the Office of the Director of National Intelligence (ODNI). The other members of the IC are:

=== List of members ===
Seal	Organization	Parent organization	Federal department	Date est.
	Central Intelligence Agency (CIA)	Independent agency		1947
	Bureau of Intelligence and Research (INR)	Department of State	State	1945
	Office of Naval Intelligence (ONI)	US Navy	Defense	1882
	Sixteenth Air Force (16AF)	US Air Force	Defense	1954
	Military Intelligence Corps (United States Army) (MIC)	US Army	Defense	1885
	Marine Corps Intelligence (MCI)	US Marine Corps	Defense	1920
	National Space Intelligence Center (NSIC)	US Space Force	Defense	2022
	National Security Agency (NSA) / Central Security Service (CSS) (Note: The NSA's Central Security Service consists of the Service Cryptologic Components which include the Army Intelligence and Security Command, Marine Corps Information Command, Navy Fleet Cyber Command, Sixteenth Air Force, United States Space Force, and Coast Guard Deputy Assistant Commandant for Intelligence.)	Department of Defense	Defense	1952
	National Reconnaissance Office (NRO)	Department of Defense	Defense	1961
	Defense Intelligence Agency (DIA)	Department of Defense	Defense	1961
	National Geospatial-Intelligence Agency (NGA)	Department of Defense	Defense	1996
	Office of Intelligence and Counterintelligence (OICI)	Department of Energy	Energy	1977
	Office of Intelligence and Analysis (OIA)	Department of the Treasury	Treasury	2004
	Intelligence Branch (IB)	Federal Bureau of Investigation	Justice	2005
	National Security Branch (NSB)	Federal Bureau of Investigation	Justice	2005
	Office of National Security Intelligence (ONSI)	Drug Enforcement Administration	Justice	2006
	Coast Guard Intelligence (CGI)	US Coast Guard	Homeland Security (Note: The President can transfer the Coast Guard to be under the Department of the Navy making its federal department the Department of Defense)	1915
	Office of Intelligence and Analysis (I&A)	Department of Homeland Security	Homeland Security	2007

=== Programs ===
The IC performs under two separate programs:

- The National Intelligence Program (NIP), formerly known as the National Foreign Intelligence Program as defined by the National Security Act of 1947 (as amended), "refers to all programs, projects, and activities of the intelligence community, as well as any other programs of the intelligence community designated jointly by the director of national intelligence (DNI) and the head of a United States department or agency or by the president. Such term does not include programs, projects, or activities of the military departments to acquire intelligence solely for the planning and conduct of tactical military operations by the United States Armed Forces". Under the law, the DNI is responsible for directing and overseeing the NIP, though the ability to do so is limited (see the Organization structure and leadership section).
- The Military Intelligence Program (MIP) refers to the programs, projects, or activities of the military departments to acquire intelligence solely for the planning and conduct of tactical military operations by the United States Armed Forces. The MIP is directed and controlled by the under secretary of defense for intelligence. In 2005 the Department of Defense combined the Joint Military Intelligence Program and the Tactical Intelligence and Related Activities program to form the MIP.

Since the definitions of the NIP and MIP overlap when they address military intelligence, the assignment of intelligence activities to the NIP and MIP sometimes proves problematic.

=== Organizational structure and leadership ===
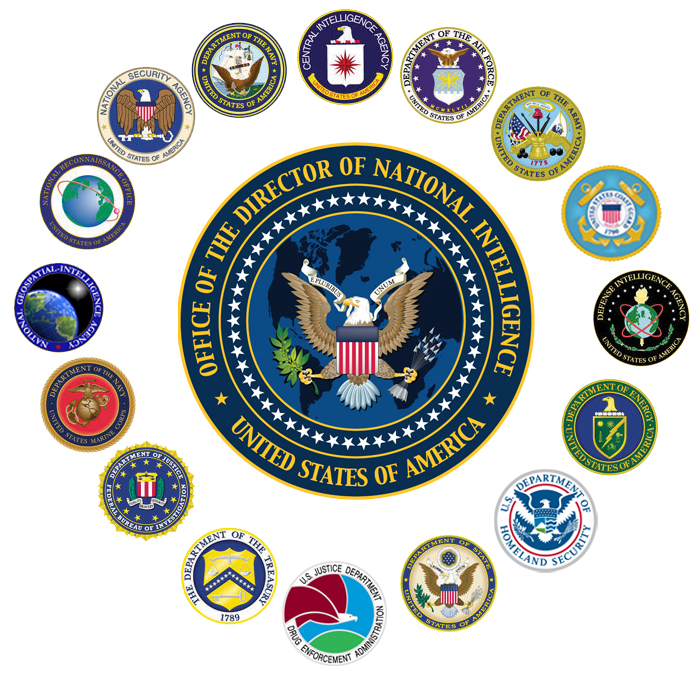

The overall organization of the IC is primarily governed by the National Security Act of 1947 (as amended) and Executive Order 12333. The statutory organizational relationships were substantially revised with the 2004 Intelligence Reform and Terrorism Prevention Act (IRTPA) amendments to the 1947 National Security Act.

Though the IC characterizes itself as a federation of its member elements, its overall structure is better characterized as a confederation due to its lack of a well-defined, unified leadership and governance structure. Prior to 2004, the director of Central Intelligence (DCI) was the head of the IC, in addition to being the director of the CIA. A major criticism of this arrangement was that the DCI had little or no actual authority over the budgetary authorities of the other IC agencies and therefore had limited influence over their operations.

Following the passage of IRTPA in 2004, the head of the IC is the director of national intelligence (DNI). The DNI exerts leadership of the IC primarily through statutory authorities used to:

- develops and executes the National Intelligence Program budget;
- establishes objectives, priorities, and guidance for the IC; and
- manages and directs the tasking of, collection, analysis, production, and dissemination of national intelligence by elements of the IC.

Despite these responsibilities, the DNI has no authority to direct and control any element of the IC except their own staff—the Office of the DNI—nor does the DNI have the authority to hire or fire personnel in the IC except those on their own staff. The member elements in the executive branch are directed and controlled by their respective department heads, all cabinet-level officials reporting to the president. By law, only the director of the Central Intelligence Agency reports to the DNI.

In light of major intelligence failures in recent years that called into question how well intelligence community ensures US national security, particularly those identified by the 9/11 Commission (National Commission on Terrorist Attacks Upon the United States), and the "WMD Commission" (Commission on the Intelligence Capabilities of the United States Regarding Weapons of Mass Destruction), the authorities and powers of the DNI and the overall organizational structure of the IC have become subject of intense debate in the United States.

=== Interagency cooperation ===
Previously, interagency cooperation and the flow of information among the member agencies was hindered by policies that sought to limit the pooling of information out of privacy and security concerns. Attempts to modernize and facilitate interagency cooperation within the IC include technological, structural, procedural, and cultural dimensions. Examples include the Intellipedia wiki of encyclopedic security-related information; the creation of the Office of the Director of National Intelligence, National Intelligence Centers, Program Manager Information Sharing Environment, and Information Sharing Council; legal and policy frameworks set by the Intelligence Reform and Terrorism Prevention Act of 2004, information sharing Executive Order 13354 and Executive Order 13388, and the 2005 National Intelligence Strategy.

The Department of Defense Intelligence Information System(DoDIIS.mil) facilitates inter agency cooperation and communication in the IC. Part of the DoDIIS are classified systems e.g. JWICS and SIPRNET, classified websites, and non-classified systems e.g. NIPRNET. It also includes Intellipedia-TS: Accessible via JWICS for Top Secret information, Intellipedia-S: Accessible via SIPRNET for Secret-level information., and Intellipedia-U: Accessible via NIPRNET for unclassified but sensitive information. The NIU was and is involved in developing the DoDIIS.

=== Budget ===
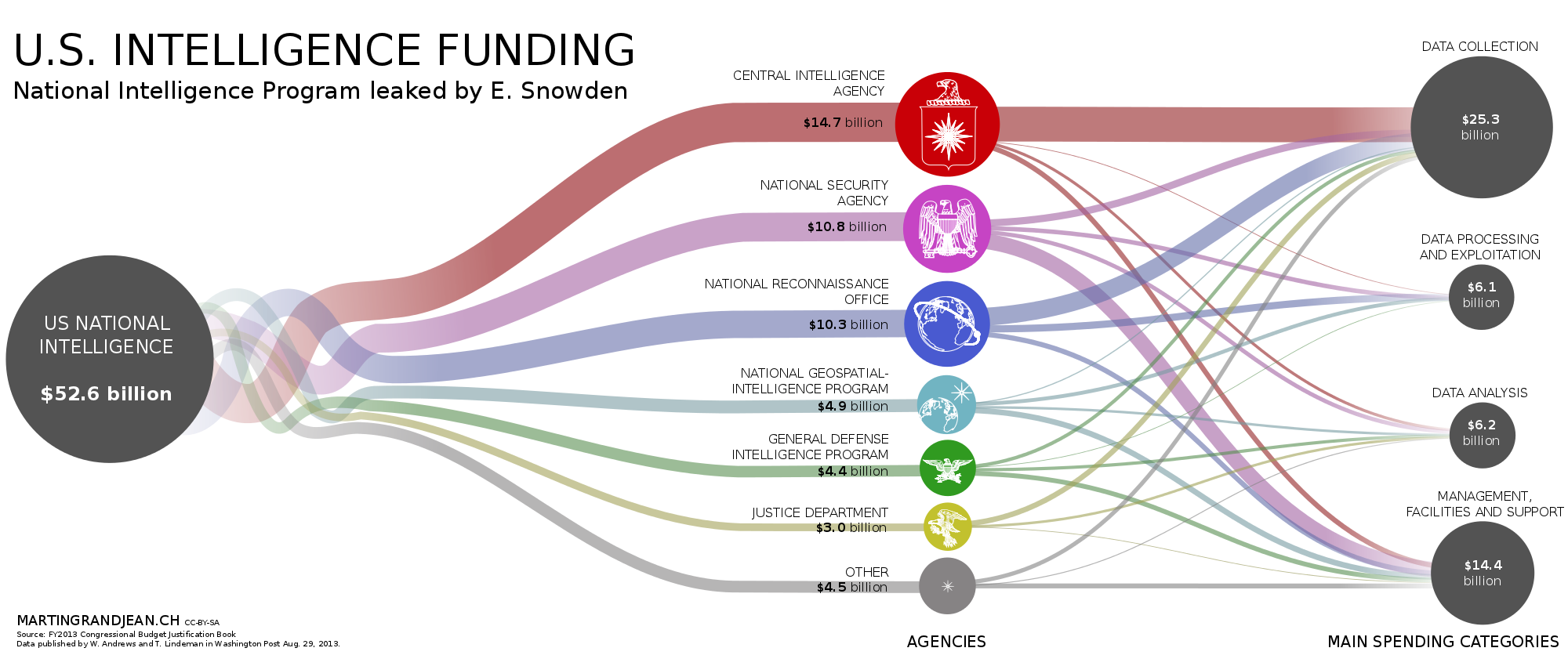
Data visualization of the US intelligence black budget as of 2013

The United States intelligence budget (excluding the Military Intelligence Program) in fiscal year 2022 was appropriated as $65.7 billion, an increase of $3.4 billion from the $62.3 billion requested and up from $60.8 billion in fiscal year 2021. The total budget of the National Intelligence Program has been public since 2007, due to the Implementing Recommendations of the 9/11 Commission Act of 2007, which required them to disclose the "aggregate amount of funds appropriated by Congress” for the NIP within 30 days of the end of the fiscal year. The requested budget of the NIP has been public since 2011 due to a requirement enacted by Congress in Section 364 of the Intelligence Authorization Act for Fiscal Year 2010.

About 70 percent of the intelligence budget went to contractors for the procurement of technology and services (including analysis), according to the May 2007 chart from the ODNI. Intelligence spending has increased by a third over ten years ago, in inflation-adjusted dollars, according to the Center for Strategic and Budgetary Assessments.

In a statement on the release of new declassified figures, DNI Mike McConnell said there would be no additional disclosures of classified budget information beyond the overall spending figure because "such disclosures could harm national security". How the money is divided among the 16 intelligence agencies and what it is spent on is classified. It includes salaries for about 100,000 people, multi billion-dollar satellite programs, aircraft, weapons, electronic sensors, intelligence analysis, spies, computers, and software.

On August 29, 2013 The Washington Post published the summary of the Office of the Director of National Intelligence's multivolume FY 2013 Congressional Budget Justification, the US intelligence community's top-secret "black budget." The IC's FY 2013 budget details how the 16 spy agencies use the money and how it performs against the goals set by the president and Congress. Experts said that access to such details about US spy programs is without precedent. Steven Aftergood of the Federation of American Scientists, which provides analyses of national security issues, stated that "It was a titanic struggle just to get the top-line budget number disclosed, and that has only been done consistently since 2007 ... but a real grasp of the structure and operations of the intelligence bureaucracy has been totally beyond public reach. This kind of material, even on a historical basis, has simply not been available." Access to budget details will enable an informed public debate on intelligence spending for the first time, said the co-chair of the 9/11 Commission Lee H. Hamilton. He added that Americans should not be excluded from the budget process because the intelligence community has a profound impact on the life of ordinary Americans.

=== Oversight ===
Intelligence Community Oversight duties are distributed to both the executive and legislative branches. Primary executive oversight is performed by the President's Foreign Intelligence Advisory Board, the Joint intelligence community Council, the Office of the Inspector General, and the Office of Management and Budget. Primary congressional oversight jurisdiction over the IC is assigned to two committees: the United States House Permanent Select Committee on Intelligence and the United States Senate Select Committee on Intelligence. The House Armed Services Committee and Senate Armed Services Committee draft bills to annually authorize the budgets of DoD intelligence activities, and both the House and Senate appropriations committees annually draft bills to appropriate the budgets of the IC. The Senate Committee on Homeland Security and Governmental Affairs took a leading role in formulating the intelligence reform legislation in the 108th Congress.

== See also ==
- UKUSA Agreement, and other members of Five Eyes:
  - United Kingdom intelligence community
  - New Zealand intelligence agencies
  - Intelligence services in Canada
  - Australian intelligence community
- List of intelligence agencies
- National Security Act of 1947
- Top Secret America, a 2010 Washington Post series on the post-9/11 growth of the United States intelligence community
- United States National Security Council
- World Basic Information Library – a joint Army/Navy program which allows all Reserve Component military personnel to contribute to the sharing of open-source intelligence (OSINT)
