= Financial Transactions and Reports Analysis Centre of Canada =

National financial intelligence agency of Canada

- Centre d'analyse des opérations et déclarations financières du Canada
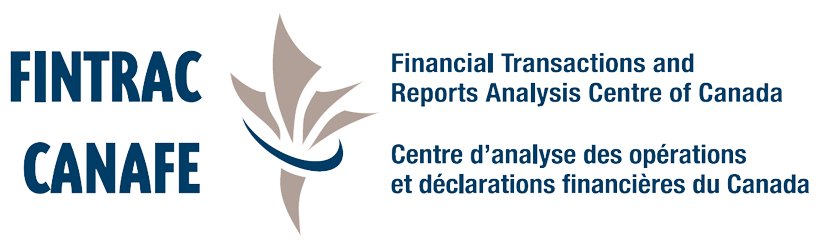

Agency overview
- Formed: 2000
- Headquarters: Ottawa, Ontario, Canada
- Employees: 556 (2024)
- Annual budget: $51.5 million
- Minister responsible: François-Philippe Champagne, Minister of Finance
- Agency executive: Sarah Paquet, Director and Chief Executive Officer
- Parent agency: Department of Finance
- Key document: Proceeds of Crime (Money Laundering and Terrorist Financing) Act
- Website: fintrac-canafe.gc.ca

The Financial Transactions and Reports Analysis Centre of Canada (FINTRAC; French: Centre d'analyse des opérations et déclarations financières du Canada) is the national financial intelligence agency of Canada. FINTRAC has been a member of the Egmont Group of Financial Intelligence Units, an international organization of financial intelligence bodies that includes the US FinCEN, since June 2002.

== History ==
FINTRAC was established under the ministry of Paul Martin in 2000 by the Proceeds of Crime (Money Laundering) Act to facilitate detection and investigation of money laundering.

Its mandate was expanded in December 2001 following amendments to the Proceeds of Crime Act to also disclose financial intelligence to other Canadian intelligence and law enforcement agencies with respect to suspected terrorist financing.

FINTRAC's mandate was further expanded in 2006 under Finance minister Jim Flaherty as Bill C-25 or ‘’An Act to amend the Proceeds of Crime (Money Laundering) and Terrorist Financing Act and the Income Tax Act’’ to enhance the client identification, record-keeping and reporting measures. It established a registration regime for money services businesses, foreign exchange dealers, real estate developers, and dealers in precious metals and gems; and created new offences for not registering.

During the abortive invocation of the Emergencies Act in February 2022, FINTRAC circulated a list of people whom it deemed terrorists to the institutions under its supervision with instructions to summarily suspend or terminate access to financial services for list members.

Online crowdfunding platforms and their payment processors were added to the list of organizations under FINTRAC supervision by the omnibus budget Bill C-19 in April 2022 by minister Chrystia Freeland after it was noticed in the course of the Freedom Convoy that these types of financial providers had escaped supervision. The new measures added a 24% increase in dollar terms and a 13% increase in number of personnel.

In October 2025, Finance Minister François-Philippe Champagne announced a new Financial Crimes Agency to investigate complex financial crimes, supplementing rather than replacing FINTRAC. Bill C-29, for the Financial Crimes Agency Act, was tabled on April 27, 2026.

== Activities ==
FINTRAC receives information from regulated entities on:

- Suspicious transactions
- Suspected terrorist property
- Large cash transactions
- Outgoing or Incoming International Electronic funds transfer over $10,000 CAD within a 24-hour period
- Cross border currency reporting

In 2009, FINTRAC estimated that the amount of money laundered on an annual basis is somewhere between $5 and $15 billion.

FINTRAC publishes annual results, quarterly updates, performance reports, and notices.

FINTRAC analyzes approximately 19 million transactions per year. In 2017, FINTRAC made 2,000 disclosures to police forces.

=== Public-private partnerships ===
Starting in 2016, FINTRAC began a series of public-private partnerships, each with a special project name to be used when reporting suspicious activity and each with a specific type of crime to target.

- Project PROTECT, launched in January 2016 in partnership with Bank of Montreal, is aimed at combating human trafficking. According to FINTRAC, reporting on money laundering related to trafficking went up 750% after the special project began.
- Project CHAMELEON, led by HSBC and established in 2017, seeks to protect victims of romance fraud.
- Project GUARDIAN, started in February 2018 with the help of the Canadian Imperial Bank of Commerce, tracks the movement of opioids and fentanyl.
- Project ATHENA is an operation led by the Royal Canadian Mounted Police focused on the movement of money through casinos and underground banking that launched in 2019.
- Project SHADOW, a joint effort with Scotiabank that began in December 2020, is designed to prevent child sexual exploitation.
- Project LEGION kicked off in 2022 in partnership with Toronto-Dominion Bank and highlights money laundering efforts tied into the sale of cannabis.
- Project ANTON, a 2023 international endeavor named in honor of Anton Mzimba, brings attention to the illicit wildlife trade.
- Project DOLUS is focused on money laundering disguised through online gambling.

The U.S. corollary to FINTRAC, FinCEN, has also joined in on projects PROTECT, GUARDIAN, SHADOW, and ANTON.

=== Enforcement ===
FINTRAC can impose administrative monetary penalties for non-compliance with the Proceeds of Crime (Money Laundering and Terrorist Financing) Act. In 2024–25 it issued a record 23 notices of violation totalling more than CA$25 million. Its largest single penalty, CA$176,960,190, was imposed in October 2025 on Xeltox Enterprises Ltd. (operating as Cryptomus), a virtual currency platform, for 2,593 violations including failures to file suspicious transaction reports and breaches of a directive on Iran-related transactions.

== Directors ==
The Director is appointed by the Governor-in-Council for a term of not more than five years during the pleasure of the Governor General and on the expiry of a first or subsequent term of office but no person shall hold office as Director for terms of more than ten years in the aggregate.

- Sarah Paquet, November 18, 2020
- Nada Semaan, March 5, 2018
- Barry MacKillop (Interim Director), October 18, 2017 – March 4, 2018.
- Gérald Cossette, October 15, 2012 – October 17, 2017
- Jeanne M. Flemming, March 3, 2008 – 2012
- Keith Fernandez, acting director, 2007–2008
- Horst Intscher, 2000–2007

== Reports ==
Most FINTRAC reports can be submitted electronically or in paper. For electronic submissions, reporting entities must be enrolled in FINTRAC's electronic reporting system and can use either FINTRAC's web form or a batch report, which enables the submission of several reports at once using a public key certificate. The following activities are to be filed in reports to FINTRAC:

- Suspicious transactions
- Large cash transactions
- Large virtual currency transactions
- Electronic funds transfers
- Casino disbursements
- Terrorist property
- Alternative to large cash transaction reports

FINTRAC can also receive the following information:

- Cross-border currency or monetary instruments reports
- Voluntary Information

Virtual currency reporting obligations were phased in under amendments effective June 2020 (registration as a money services business) and June 2021 (added record-keeping and originator-identification requirements).

== Oversight ==
FINTRAC reports to the Parliament of Canada through the Minister of Finance. Section 72(2) of the Proceeds of Crime (Money Laundering and Terrorist Financing) Act also mandates audits of FINTRAC by the Privacy Commissioner of Canada every two years.

Since 2019 its national security and intelligence activities are subject to oversight by the National Security and Intelligence Review Agency and the National Security and Intelligence Committee of Parliamentarians.

The Financial Action Task Force (FATF)'s 2016 mutual evaluation found Canada's regime achieved good results in some areas but had gaps in sectors such as legal services, real estate and online casinos, rating it "compliant" or "largely compliant" with 27 of 40 recommendations. A 2021 follow-up report assessed Canada's progress on those gaps.

== Criticism ==
In 2009, the Privacy Commissioner of Canada reported that FINTRAC was receiving and retaining personal information beyond its remit, in breach of the Privacy Act, and that this "presents an unquestionable risk to privacy by making available for use or disclosure personal information which should never have been obtained." Follow-up audits in 2013 and 2017 found the problem persisted. The 2017 audit found roughly 230,000 transactions below the reporting threshold had been retained without legal authority, though it noted incremental improvements.

The 2022 Cullen Commission inquiry into money laundering in British Columbia found FINTRAC disclosed too little intelligence to local law enforcement and that reporting entities engaged in high-volume, low-value "defensive filing." This followed years of reporting on the "Vancouver model," in which cash allegedly laundered through B.C. casinos was reinvested in real estate, with one 2019 estimate putting the resulting flow at up to CA$5.3 billion.

== See also ==
- FinCEN
- Suspicious activity report
- Tax avoidance and tax evasion
- Office of Terrorism and Financial Intelligence (United States)
