= National Security and Intelligence Review Agency =

Canadian federal oversight agency

Agency overview
- Formed: July 19, 2019
- Preceding agencies: Security Intelligence Review Committee; Office of the CSE Commissioner
- Jurisdiction: Government of Canada
- Headquarters: Ottawa, Ontario, Canada
- Employees: 29
- Annual budget: $5 million (2019)
- Agency executive: The Hon. Marie Deschamps, Chair
- Website: nsira-ossnr.gc.ca

The National Security and Intelligence Review Agency (NSIRA; French: Office de surveillance des activités en matière de sécurité nationale et de renseignement, OSSNR) is an independent government agency organized to review all national security and intelligence activities carried out by the Government of Canada. NSIRA was established in June 2019 to replace the Security Intelligence Review Committee, which was limited to reviewing the activities of the Canadian Security Intelligence Service (CSIS).

== Mandate and history ==
NSIRA ensures that Canada's national security agencies are complying with the law and that their actions are reasonable and necessary. It has full and independent authority to determine what government activities it reviews, including ongoing national security and intelligence activities.

The National Security and Intelligence Review Agency (NSIRA) Act was introduced to the House of Commons in June 2017 as part of an omnibus national security bill, the National Security Act, 2017, and received Royal Assent on June 21, 2019. The NSIRA Act closed gaps in the national security accountability framework first identified by Justice O'Connor in the 2006 report of the Commission of Inquiry into the Actions of Canadian Officials in Relation to Maher Arar, and subsequently by many others. Prior to NSIRA, only specific agencies had independent expert review bodies, and these bodies could not collaborate or share classified information. NSIRA, by contrast, is mandated to review all Government of Canada national security and intelligence activities in an integrated manner, without regard for the department or agency the activities fall under. This model recognizes the increasingly interconnected nature of the government's national security and intelligence activities. This includes, but is not limited to, the activities of the Canadian Security Intelligence Service (CSIS) and the Communications Security Establishment (CSE), the Royal Canadian Mounted Police (RCMP), the Canada Border Services Agency (CBSA), the Department of National Defence (DND), Global Affairs Canada (GAC), the Department of Justice, and others.

To fulfill its review mandate, NSIRA is entitled to receive all information held by federal entities that NSIRA deems relevant to its reviews, no matter how classified or sensitive. This includes information subject to a legal privilege. NSIRA also hears public complaints regarding the activities of the Canadian Security Intelligence Service (CSIS) and the Communications Security Establishment (CSE), and the Royal Canadian Mounted Police (RCMP), as well as complaints regarding the Government of Canada security clearance process.

NSIRA replaced the Security Intelligence Review Committee, which was limited to the review of CSIS. NSIRA also replaced the former Office of the CSE Commissioner (OCSEC), which reviewed the activities of the CSE. In addition, NSIRA assumed responsibility for reviewing the national security and intelligence activities of the RCMP from the Civilian Review and Complaints Commission for the Royal Canadian Mounted Police.

NSIRA provides its findings and recommendations to relevant Ministers through classified reports. It also produces an unclassified annual report to the Prime Minister who must table that report in Parliament. NSIRA's first annual public report is to be tabled in Parliament in 2020. The NSIRA may also report to Parliament more frequently should urgent or important matters arise.

=== Collaboration with NSICOP ===
The National Security and Intelligence Committee of Parliamentarians (NSICOP) has a mandate to review the legislative, regulatory, policy, administrative and financial framework for national security and intelligence in Canada, as well as departmental activities related to national security and intelligence. NSICOP reviews will tend to be more strategic than those of NSIRA, which undertakes detailed reviews of specific activities with a strong emphasis on legal compliance. In practice, the two review bodies will complement each other and provide Canadians with comprehensive and multi-faceted scrutiny of the Government's secret activities. NSIRA and the NSICOP may exchange classified information, and are required by statute to cooperate in order to avoid unnecessary duplication of effort.

== Composition ==
NSIRA is led by a Chair and between three and six other Committee Members, appointed by the Prime Minister in consultation with Parliamentary leaders. Each member of NSIRA is appointed to hold office for a term not exceeding five years and is eligible for reappointment to a second term. NSIRA is supported by a secretariat of approximately 100 national security and legal experts.

On July 24, 2019, Prime Minister Justin Trudeau announced that former NDP MP Murray Rankin would be NSIRA's first Chair. University of Ottawa law professor Craig Forcese and all four members of the defunct Security Intelligence Review Committee were also announced as Committee Members.

Current NSIRA Committee Members
Member	Date Appointed	Term Expiry
Marie Deschamps, Chair	September 30, 2019	September 6, 2027
Craig Stephen Forcese, Vice Chair	July 24, 2019	July 24, 2028
Jim Chu	August 17, 2023	August 16, 2028
Marie-Lucie Morin	October 9, 2020	October 8, 2024
Matthew Cassar	May 26, 2022	May 25, 2027
Foluke Laosebikan	May 26, 2022	May 25, 2027
Colleen Swords	August 17, 2023	August 16, 2028

Former NSIRA Chairs
Member	Date Appointed	Term Expiry
Murray Rankin	July 24, 2019	September 17, 2020

== Academic commentary ==
Canadian jurist and lecturer Claude Laferrière has published comprehensive works on national security law, including Traité de droit de la sécurité nationale : États-Unis d’Amérique / Canada (Wilson & Lafleur, 2018) and Five Essays on U.S. National Security Law (Wilson & Lafleur, 2009).

== See also ==
- National Security and Intelligence Committee of Parliamentarians (NSICOP)
