= Intelligence Commissioner of Canada =

- Commissaire au renseignement du Canada
- Incumbent; Simon Noël since October 1, 2022
- Office of the Intelligence Commissioner
- Reports to: Prime minister of Canada
- Appointer: Governor in Council; on the advice of the prime minister
- Term length: At His Majesty's pleasure
- Constituting instrument: Intelligence Commissioner Act; National Security Act, 2017
- Formation: July 12, 2019
- Website: www.canada.ca/en/intelligence-commissioner.html

Office of the Intelligence Commissioner
- Bureau du commissaire au renseignement

Agency overview
- Formed: 2019
- Headquarters: Ottawa, Ontario, Canada
- Employees: 11
- Annual budget: $2.1 million (2019)

The intelligence commissioner of Canada (French: commissaire au renseignement du Canada) is an independent officer of the Government of Canada charged with quasi-judicial review of certain decisions made by the Minister of Public Safety and Minister of National Defence in relation to the Canadian Security Intelligence Service (CSIS) and the Communications Security Establishment (CSE).

The intelligence commissioner heads the Office of the Intelligence Commissioner of Canada (French: Bureau du commissaire au renseignement), the agency which supports the work of the commissioner. The position is a Governor in Council appointment made on the advice of the prime minister of Canada. The commissioner is accountable to the Parliament of Canada through the prime minister, who receives an annual report from the commissioner and tables it in the House of Commons.

The inaugural intelligence commissioner of Canada is Jean-Pierre Plouffe, who took office on July 12, 2019 and served until October 1, 2022. The present intelligence commissioner of Canada is Simon Noël, who took office on October 1, 2022.

== Role ==
Certain activities carried out by CSIS and the CSE must be authorized by their ministers, the Minister of Public Safety and Minister of National Defence, respectively. A subset of these authorizations must be reviewed and approved by the intelligence commissioner before they can be acted upon.

== Background ==
The office was established as part of the National Security Act, 2017, an omnibus bill introduced by the Trudeau government which reworked many of the existing mechanisms within the intelligence community in Canada, including oversight of intelligence gathering and any actions taken by intelligence agencies on behalf of the Government of Canada.

== Accountability ==
The intelligence commissioner issues a report on their activity to the prime minister annually who must table it in Parliament after removing confidential and classified information. The commissioner is entitled to receive all reports which are compiled by the National Security and Intelligence Review Agency (NSIRA).

== List of intelligence commissioners of Canada ==
No.	Name	Took office	Left office	Appointed by
1	Jean-Pierre Plouffe	July 12, 2019	October 1, 2022	Justin Trudeau
2	Simon Noël	October 1, 2022	Incumbent	Justin Trudeau

== See also ==
- National Security and Intelligence Review Agency
- Communications Security Establishment
- Canadian Security Intelligence Service
- National Security Act, 2017
