= Canada security clearance =

Permission to access restricted information

A Canada security clearance is required for viewing classified information in Canada.

== Background ==
Government classified information is governed by the Treasury Board Directive on Security Screening, the Security of Information Act and Privacy Act. Only those that are deemed to be loyal and reliable, and have been cleared are allowed to access sensitive information. The Directive replaced the Standard on Security Screening on January 1st, 2025.

Checks include basic demographic and fingerprint based criminal record checks for all levels, and, depending on an individual appointment's requirements, credit checks, loyalty, and field checks might be conducted by the RCMP and/or CSIS.

Clearance is granted, depending on types of appointment, by individual Federal government departments or agencies or by private company security officers. Those who have contracts with Public Works and Government Services Canada are bound by the Industrial Security Program, a sub-set of the GSP.

To access designated information, one must have at least standard reliability status (see Hierarchy below). Reliability checks and assessments are conditions of employment under the Public Service Employment Act, and, thus, all Government of Canada employees have at least reliability status screening completed prior to their appointment. However, Government employees by Order-in-council are not subjected to this policy.

Clearances at the reliability status and secret levels are valid for 10 years, whereas top secret is valid for 5 years. However, departments are free to request their employees to undergo security screening any time for cause. Because security clearances are granted by individual departments instead of one central government agency, clearances are inactivated at the end of appointment or when an individual transfers out of the department. The individual concerned can then apply to reactivate and transfer the security clearance to his/her new position.

== Hierarchy ==
Three levels of personnel screening exist, with two sub-screening categories:

Standard screenings are completed for individuals without law enforcement, security and intelligence functions with the government, whereas Enhanced screenings are for individuals with law enforcement, security and intelligence functions, or access to those data or facilities.

=== Security screening ===
Individuals who need to have RS because of their job or access to federal government assets will be required to sign the Personnel Screening, Consent and Authorization Form (TBS/SCT 330-23e).

- Reliability Status, Standard (RS)
  - Reliability checks are done by verifying personal data, criminal records check, credit check, educational, and professional qualifications, data on previous employment and references.
  - This level of clearance will grant the right to access designated documents with markings of Protected A & B information/assets on a need-to-know basis. It is mandatory for individuals when the duties or tasks of a position or contract necessitate access to protected information and assets, regardless of the duration of an assignment.
- Reliability Status, Enhanced (ERS)
  - In addition to the Reliability Status, Standard checks, open-source checks, and security questionnaire or interview are required.
  - This level of clearance will grant the right to access designated documents with markings of Protected A, B & C information/assets on a need-to-know basis.

=== Security clearances ===
Individuals who require access to more sensitive information (or access to sensitive federal government sites and/or assets) because of their job will be required to sign the Security Clearance Form (TBS/SCT 330-60e). There are two levels of clearance:

- Secret
  - Secret clearance is only granted after a reliability status is cleared, with a positive CSIS security assessment.
  - This level of clearance will grant the right to access designated and classified information up to Secret level on a need-to-know basis. Department Heads have the discretion to allow for an individual to access Top Secret-level information without higher-level clearance on a case-to-case basis.
  - Only those with a Secret clearance, with enhanced screening have access to Protected C information.
- Top Secret
  - In addition to the checks at the Secret level, foreign travels, assets, and character references must be given. Field check will also be conducted prior to granting the clearance.
  - This level of clearance will grant the right to access all designated and classified information on a need-to-know basis.
- Top Secret Special Access
  - In addition to the checks at the Top Secret level, 20 years of past history are investigated in person by CSIS.
  - This level of clearance will grant the right to access all designated and classified information on a need-to-know basis, primarily for intelligence roles in the Communications Security Establishment, Canadian Armed Forces, and certain senior government officials.

==== Site access ====
Two additional categories called "Site Access Status" and "Site Access Clearance" exist not for access to information purposes but for those that require physical access to sites or facilities designated by CSIS as areas "reasonably be expected to be targeted by those who engage in activities constituting threats to the security of Canada". Designated areas include Government Houses, official residences of government officials, Parliament, nuclear facilities, airport restricted areas, maritime ports, and any large-scale events that are sponsored by the federal government (e.g., 2010 Winter Olympics).

Where reliability is the primary concern, a site access status screening (similar to a reliability status, standard screening) is conducted; where loyalty to Canada is the primary concern, a site access clearance (similar to a Secret clearance screening) is required. They are both valid for 10 years.

== Legal ==
Prior to granting access to information, an individual who has been cleared must sign a Security Screening Certificate and Briefing Form (TBS/SCT 330–47), indicating their willingness to be bound by several Acts of Parliament during and after their appointment finishes. Anyone who has been given a security clearance and releases designated/classified information without legal authority is in breach of trust under section 18(2) of the Security of Information Act with a punishment up to 2 years in jail. Those who have access to Special Operational Information are held to a higher standard. The release of such information is punishable by law, under section 17(2) of the Security of Information Act, liable to imprisonment for life.

Section 750(3) of the Criminal Code states that no person convicted of an offence under section 121 (frauds on the Government), section 124 (selling or purchasing office), section 380 (Fraud - if directed against His Majesty) or section 418 (selling defective stores to His Majesty), has, after that conviction, the capacity to contract with His Majesty or to receive any benefits under a contract between His Majesty and any other person or to hold office under His Majesty unless a pardon has been granted. (This effectively prohibits granting of a Reliability Status to any such individual.)

== See also ==
- Security clearance
- List of established military terms
- List of government and military acronyms
- Security Advisory Opinion
- Classified information#Canada
