= Security of Information Act =

Act of the Parliament of Canada addressing national security

Parliament of Canada
- Long title: An Act respecting foreign interference and the security of information
- Citation: R.S.C., 1985, c. O-5

The Security of Information Act (French: Loi sur la protection de l’information, R.S.C. 1985, c. O-5), formerly known as the Official Secrets Act, is an Act of the Parliament of Canada that addresses national security concerns, including threats of espionage by foreign powers and terrorist organizations, and the intimidation or coercion of ethnocultural communities in and against Canada.

== Key provisions of the Act ==
Section	Description	Maximum sentence
1–2	Short title and definitions.	
3	Prejudice to the safety or interest of the State.	
4	Wrongful communication, etc., of information; Communication of sketch, plan, model, etc.; Receiving code word, sketch, etc.; Retaining or allowing possession of document, etc.	As per s. 27.
5	Unauthorized use of uniforms; falsification of reports, forgery, personation and false documents; Unlawful dealing with dies, seals, etc.	As per s. 27.
6	Approaching, entering, etc., a prohibited place.	As per s. 27.
7	Interference with or impeding of a peace officer or a member of Her Majesty’s forces engaged on guard, sentry, patrol or other similar duty in relation to a prohibited place.	As per s. 27.
8–12	Provisions relating to special operational information and persons permanently bound to secrecy.	
13	Purported communication of special operational information.	On indictment, imprisonment for up to 5 years less a day.
14	Unauthorized communication of special operational information.	On indictment, imprisonment for up to 14 years.
15	Public interest defence relating to offences under ss. 14–15.	
16	Communicating safeguarded information with a foreign entity or a terrorist group.	On indictment, imprisonment for life.
17	Communicating special operational information with a foreign entity or a terrorist group.	On indictment, imprisonment for life.
18	Breach of trust in respect of safeguarded information.	On indictment, imprisonment for up to 2 years.
19	Economic espionage.	On indictment, imprisonment for up to 10 years.
20	Foreign-influenced or terrorist-influenced threats or violence.	On indictment, imprisonment for life.
21	Harbouring or concealing a person who has committed or is likely to commit such an offence.	On indictment, imprisonment for up to 10 years.
22	Preparatory acts.	On indictment, imprisonment for up to 2 years.
23	Conspiracy, attempts, accessory after the fact, or counselling in relation to an offence.	Same as for principal offence.
24	Prosecution requires the assent of the Attorney General.	
25	An offence may be tried in any place in Canada.	
26	Act has extraterritorial application, where the person committing the offence is a Canadian citizen, a person owing allegiance to Her Majesty in right of Canada, a person engaged with a Canadian mission outside Canada, or a person present in Canada after the offence has been committed.	
27	Default punishment under the Act.	On indictment, imprisonment for up to 14 years; on summary conviction, imprisonment for up to 12 months, a fine up to $2,000, or both.

Certain departments ('Scheduled department') and classes of people (past and current employees) are 'permanently bound to secrecy' under the Act. These are individuals who should be held to a higher level of accountability for unauthorized disclosures of information obtained in relation to their work. For example, Military Intelligence, employees of Canadian Security Intelligence Service (CSIS), Communications Security Establishment and certain members of the Royal Canadian Mounted Police (RCMP).

This act applies to anyone who has been granted security clearance by the Federal Government, including those who have been granted Reliability Status for accessing designated information. Previously, only 'classified' information was protected under the Official Secrets Act 1981.

== Convictions ==
=== Jeffrey Delisle ===
On 13 January 2012, Jeffrey Delisle, a commissioned officer in the Royal Canadian Navy, was arrested and charged under the Security of Information Act. Delisle was accused of selling classified intelligence, including that of Canadian and other Five Eyes intelligence agencies, to the Russian Federation.

In October 2012, Delisle pleaded guilty to one count each of communicating safeguarded information and attempting to communicate safeguarded information, and one count of breach of trust under the Criminal Code. Delisle was sentenced on 8 February 2013 to 20 years in prison and fined $111,817, the amount investigators claimed he received from Russia.

Delisle was granted day parole in August 2018 and subsequently released on full parole in March 2019 with the Parole Board of Canada considering Delisle of low risk to reoffend.

=== Cameron Ortis ===
On 12 September 2019, Cameron Ortis, a senior intelligence official with the Royal Canadian Mounted Police, was arrested and subsequently charged with ten offences under the Security of Information Act and the Criminal Code. Ortis was accused of leaking classified intelligence to individuals under investigation by Canadian and international authorities.

Following an eight-week-long trial, on 22 November 2023, Ortis was found guilty of four counts of intentionally and without authority communicating special operational information to unauthorized individuals. Ortis was also found guilty of one count each of fraudulently obtaining a computer service and breach of trust under the Criminal Code.

On 7 February 2024, Ortis was sentenced to 14 years in prison minus time served in custody.

== See also ==
- Security clearances in Canada
- Information classification in Canada
- Information security
