= Executive Order 13356 =

2004 United States executive order

Executive Order 13356 is a United States Presidential Executive Order signed on August 27, 2004, by President George W. Bush. Its stated goal was "Strengthening the Sharing of Terrorism Information To Protect Americans". It was supplemented by and partially superseded Executive Order 13388.

Section 1 of the executive order lays out a policy change, instructing the directors of US intelligence agencies:

...to the maximum extent consistent with applicable law ... give the highest priority to (i) the detection, prevention, disruption, preemption, and mitigation of the effects of terrorist activities against the territory, people, and interests of the United States of America.

Later sections of the Executive Order specified the details of how the directors of intelligence agencies should implement this policy change.
