= United States Joint Intelligence Community Council =

The Joint Intelligence Community Council (JICC) assists the Director of National Intelligence (DNI) in implementing a joint, unified national intelligence effort to protect national and homeland security and advise the DNI on setting requirements, managing finances, establishing uniform intelligence policies, and monitoring and evaluating performance of the Intelligence Community.

== Establishment ==
The Intelligence Reform and Terrorism Prevention Act of 2004 established the Joint Intelligence Community Council as the most senior executive body managing the Intelligence Community. The JICC typically meets semiannually. To see a copy of the JICC's first meeting in pdf format, click here.

== Membership ==
The Director of National Intelligence chairs the Joint Intelligence Community Council. Other members of the oversight body include:

- The Secretary of State
- The Secretary of the Treasury
- The Secretary of Defense
- The Attorney General
- The Secretary of Energy
- The Secretary of Homeland Security
- Other officers of the United States Government designated by the President

== Functions ==
=== Advise the DNI ===
In order to assist the Director of National Intelligence in developing and implementing a joint, unified national intelligence effort to protect national security, the Joint Intelligence Community Council serves two functions. The first function is to advise the DNI on how to most effectively establish requirements, develop budgets, manage finances, and monitor and evaluate the performance of the Intelligence Community. This list is not exhaustive, however, as the DNI may request the JICC for advisement on other matters related to national security.

=== Ensure the execution of programs ===
The second function designated to the Joint Intelligence Community Council to ensure a unified intelligence effort is to ensure the timely execution of programs, policies, and directives established by the chairman, the DNI.

== Advice and opinions of members other than the chairman ==
The Director of National Intelligence (Chairman of the JICC) presents his/her advice and opinions gathered from the advice and opinions of the JICC to the president and National Security Council. If a dissenting member of the JICC disagrees with, or wishes to add to, the advice and opinions of the chairman presented to the president and the National Security Council, the dissenting member may submit to the chairman his/her opinions. If such a situation occurs, the chairman must present the advice or opinions of the dissenting member at the same time as the chairman presents his/hers to the president and the National Security Council. As a result, the chairman must establish procedures to ensure that the presentation of the advice of the chairman to the president and the National Security Council is not unduly delayed due to the submission of dissenting opinions.

== Recommendations to Congress ==
All members of the Joint Intelligence Community Council may present any recommendations relating to the Intelligence Community to Congress as the presenter considers appropriate.

== Effectiveness ==
=== Positives ===
According to Tom Ridge, former Secretary of Homeland Security, the Joint Intelligence Community Council is critical to the Intelligence Community. The Chairman of the JICC reports to the President as the head of the Intelligence Community. The JICC is critical to ensuring that the chairman provides sound advice to the President and the National Security Council. Additionally, the JICC provides each of its members the opportunity to shape intelligence priorities.

=== Criticisms ===
Critics of the effectiveness of the Joint Intelligence Community Council offer two key criticisms. First, the members of the JICC, other than the chairman, are unlikely to have the time to devote to intelligence management issues. In addition to serving on the oversight body examining intelligence, members of the JICC are also responsible for managing the Department of State, Department of the Treasury, Department of Defense, Department of Justice, etc. The second criticism against the effectiveness of the JICC is the lack of power yielded to the chairman. In addition to the rights of all JICC member to convey their view to the President, all of the members, aside from the chairman, have additional avenues to speak to the President separate from the JICC. This current structure challenges the power and decisions of the chairman.

== See also ==
- Director of National Intelligence
- United States Intelligence Community Oversight
- President's Foreign Intelligence Advisory Board
