= Simon Noël =

Retired Canadian judge

Intelligence Commissioner of Canada
- Incumbent
- Assumed office October 1, 2022

Federal Court of Canada
- In office August 8, 2002 – August 31, 2022

Personal details
- Born: November 17, 1947 (age 78) Quebec City, Quebec

Simon Noël (born November 17, 1947) is a retired Federal Court of Canada judge.

From 1979 to 1981, he acted as counsel on the Royal Commission of Inquiry into Certain Activities of the RCMP, and co-chief prosecutor on the Commission reviewing the Somalia Affair.

Noël retired from the Federal Court on August 31, 2022.

On October 5, 2022 it was announced that the Governor General in Council had appointed Noël as the new Intelligence Commissioner of Canada for a five-year term, effective October 1, 2022.
