= Caroline Xavier =

Canadian public official

- Born: XXth century Montréal
- Occupation: manager
- Known for: Chief of the Communications Security Establishment since 2022

Caroline Xavier is the Chief of the Canadian Communications Security Establishment (CSE) since August 2022.

She is a daughter of migrants from Haiti who went to study in Canada and immigrated there. She graduated at the University of Ottawa with a degree in Administration, and earned a master's degree at the Dalhousie University in Nova Scotia. She has worked as a public servant for more than 30 years, including positions at the Industry Canada, the Canada Revenue Agency and the Canada Border Services Agency.

In 2017 she was appointed Assistant Secretary to the Cabinet, Security and Intelligence at the Privy Council Office. In February 2020 she was appointed Associate Deputy Minister of Immigration, Refugees and Citizenship for the Government of Canada.

On August 31, 2022, she was appointed Chief of Communications Security Establishment.

In 2023 she was recognised as a Canada's outstanding black woman by Shifter.
