= BID 610 =

- Date invented: 1960s
- Type: cipher machine

BID/610, codenamed Alvis, was a British cipher machine used by both British and Canadian governments and also by NATO. It was the first fully transistorised full-duplex online cipher machine used by the British Army. It was introduced in the 1960s and was approved for NATO-wide use on 17 April 1962, after winning a NATO-evaluation for a Tapeless Rotorless On-Line (TROL) cipher machine.
