= United States Intelligence Community Oversight =

Oversight of the United States' national security agencies

United States Intelligence Community Oversight duties are shared by both the executive and legislative branches of the government. Oversight, in this case, is the supervision of intelligence agencies, and making them accountable for their actions. Generally oversight bodies look at the following general issues: following policymaker needs, the quality of analysis, operations, and legality of actions.

== Executive and legislative roles ==
Congress's oversight responsibilities over the intelligence community sometimes overlap with the responsibilities and authorities of the executive branch. Given the natural competition that exists between the legislative and executive branches, this overlap creates tensions as both sides struggle to accomplish certain goals using their respective powers and authorities. Hence intelligence oversight can be one of the most challenging separation-of-powers issues in government.

=== Executive Branch ===
The White House sets the national security and foreign affairs agenda. Congress and the judicial branch have affirmed the executive branch's lead role for conducting national security affairs numerous times. Furthermore, the White House can limit congressional influence in the domain of national security and intelligence.

=== Access to information ===
The White House has the power to control information classification, and even withhold access to information and operational details from certain members of Congress. In this way, the executive branch can directly control what Congress can or cannot see, indirectly influencing the legislative branch's overall ability to make decisions. Thus, despite members of the Intelligence Committees and their staffs holding appropriate security clearances, they may sometimes only have a limited view into specific intelligence activities.

Though the National Security Act of 1947 states that Congress must be kept "fully informed" of significant intelligence activities, many Presidents have interpreted this clause to mean they only need to notify the "Gang of Eight" rather than the full membership of the congressional intelligence committees. The Gang of Eight consists of the Senate Majority and Minority Leaders, the Speaker and Majority Leader of the House, and the Chairs and ranking members of the House and Senate Intelligence Committees. Veto Power: The President also has the power to veto any legislation that Congress passes.

For example, President George W. Bush's veto of the Intelligence Authorization Bill of 2009, which included language on coercive interrogation, indicates that this can be a very effective tool to control the ability of Congress to influence intelligence policy. Direct Authority: Leaders of the IC are appointed by the President to their positions, and the White House has the authority to hire and fire them. While some of these positions – such as the CIA Director– require Senate confirmation, many do not. As a result, the President is able to appoint trusted advisors to key positions in the IC.

=== Legislative Branch ===
Although the Constitution gives the executive branch preeminence in dealing with intelligence matters, Article I nevertheless provides Congress with an important oversight role. However, Congressional oversight into intelligence issues is a complex task, requiring a sophisticated understanding of the issues. The floor debate for the FISA Amendments Act of 2008 provided a clear example of the difficulties Congress faces when trying to modify intelligence legislation. Members, for reasons of classification or technical complexity, did not share a common understanding of the law, let alone how it should be adjusted.

=== Authorization and appropriation ===
Congress's most important source of leverage is the power to authorize programs and appropriate funds. During the authorization and appropriations process, Congress can signal its intelligence and policy priorities through both the allocation of funds and the inclusion of non budget-related clauses in the authorization and appropriations bills.

Nominations: Many of the IC's top leaders, including the Director of National Intelligence and the Director of the Central Intelligence Agency, are nominated by the President of the United States and confirmed by the United States Senate. This sometimes grueling process forces the White House to carefully select its nominees and provides an opportunity for Senate input on both the individuals and issues related to intelligence policy. In recent years, the Senate has withheld confirmation until the executive branch agreed to share additional information on key areas of congressional oversight of intelligence activities.

=== Congressional hearings ===
Congress invites and, in some cases, compels high-ranking members of the executive branch to appear before Congress to ask them targeted questions intended to create more transparent and effective intelligence community operations. However, the power of this tool depends in large part on Congress's awareness of intelligence community activities.

== Executive oversight ==
Oversight in the executive branch usually focuses on covert action and espionage. The President heads oversight in the executive branch, and all covert actions must be approved by him or her, consistent with the provisions of the Intelligence Authorization Act and Hughes–Ryan Act. The President has the power to appoint commissions, which can be used to assess intelligence topics, as was done with the formation of the 9/11 Commission and the Iraq Intelligence Commission.

=== President's Foreign Intelligence Advisory Board ===
The President's Foreign Intelligence Advisory Board (PFIAB) is now known as President's Intelligence Advisory Board (PIAB). Under the PIAB is the Intelligence Oversight Board (IOB), which is used to carry out investigations and initiate analysis activities for the President. The PIAB members are appointed by the President and are usually individuals with relevant experience.

In 2008, President George W. Bush by Executive Order removed some oversight powers from the IOB. Critics argued that the changes have weakened oversight capabilities. Previously, if the IOB learned of allegedly illegal or contrary to executive order intelligence activity, it notified both the president and the attorney general, now however, the IOB must refer matters to the Justice Department for a criminal investigation. In addition, the IOB lost the authority to oversee each intelligence agency's general counsel and inspector general. The main issue with the PIAB is concerns, since they are appointed by the president, there may be politicization of their recommendations.

=== Offices of Inspector-General ===
Under each cabinet position and intelligence agency, the Office of the Inspector General (OIG) and the General Counsel, have oversight responsibilities (see The Inspector General Act). The OIG reports to the Secretary of the department and/or the director of their agency as well as Congress. The OIG are tasked with the following

- Conduct independent and objective audits, investigations and inspections
- Prevent and detect waste, fraud and abuse, Promote economy, effectiveness and efficiency,
- Review pending legislation and regulation
- Keep the agency head and Congress fully and currently informed.

The OIGs for the Intelligence Community include:

- Inspector General of the Intelligence Community
- Central Intelligence Agency Office of Inspector General
- Department of Defense Office of Inspector General
1. National Security Agency Office of the Inspector General
2. Defense Intelligence Agency Office of the Inspector General
3. National Geospatial-Intelligence Agency Office of the Inspector General
4. Office of the Inspector General of the United States Air Force
5. Office of the Inspector General of the United States Army
6. Office of the Inspector General of the United States Navy
7. Office of the Inspector General of the Marine Corps
8. U.S. Space Command Inspector General
- U.S. Department of Energy Office of Inspector General
- Department of Homeland Security Office of Inspector General
- United States Department of Justice Office of the Inspector General
- Department of State Office of Inspector General
- U.S. Department of the Treasury Office of Inspector General

It is possible for a separate Inspector General to conduct an investigation if instructed by the Council of the Inspectors General on Integrity and Efficiency. For example, in 2007, the State Department Inspector General, Howard Krongard, recused himself from investigating the activities of the American Private Military Company, Blackwater Security due to revelations during a House Oversight and Government Affairs Committee hearing that Mr. Krongard's brother served on Blackwater’s advisory board.

=== National Security Council ===
The National Security Council's (NSC) Office of Intelligence Programs (OIP) provides routine oversight and intelligence policy for the intelligence community. The Director of National Intelligence (DNI) also oversees and directs the implementation of the National Intelligence Program for the intelligence community. The oversight body in the Office of the DNI is the Joint Intelligence Community Council (JICC) which is chaired by the DNI; other members include the secretaries of State, Treasury, Defense, Energy, Homeland Security and the Attorney General. The effectiveness of the JICC is questioned for two reasons, one, Cabinet members likely do not have the time to devote to intelligence issues, and two, the JICC officers are more powerful than the DNI in that they have separate opportunities to speak to the president, which gives them supplementary means to challenge DNI decisions.

=== Other Executive oversight bodies ===
The Office of Management and Budget (OMB) also oversees agencies, the OMB "reviews intelligence budgets in light of presidential policies and priorities, clears proposed testimony, and approves draft intelligence legislation for submission to Congress."

The Department of Defense (DoD) has its own oversight body, the DoD Intelligence Oversight Program (IOP). The main objective of IOP is "to ensure that the DoD can conduct its intelligence and counterintelligence missions while protecting the statutory and constitutional rights of U.S. persons."

== Legislative oversight ==
Congress justifies its oversight abilities using two main reasons; the first is the Necessary and Proper Clause of the US Constitution (since courts found that the clause includes the power to require reports from the executive on anything that can be legislated) and the second is the Power of the Purse. Congressional oversight focuses on the supervising of the budget, quality of analysis, legality of actions, and intelligence failures. The two principal committees that are charged with intelligence community oversight are the House Permanent Select Committee on Intelligence and the Senate Select Committee on Intelligence. Other Committee's, besides the respective Intelligence Committees and their subcommittees, may conduct oversight over specific elements of the Intelligence Community. For example, the Judiciary Committee in both the House and Senate have jurisdiction to review the intelligence activities of the FBI and the Homeland Security Committees have jurisdiction on the DHS Office of Intelligence and Analysis.

=== Congressional oversight history ===
These congressional organizations emerged in the late 1970s, when the Church and Pike Committees investigated the CIA and other intelligence agencies in response to the Watergate scandal. Both committees found evidence of spying on American citizens, illegal wiretapping, and cover-ups. As a result, Senate Resolution 400 in 1976 and House Resolution 658 in 1977 established the permanent congressional intelligence committees.

=== Congressional Intelligence Committees ===
The intelligence committees are just one of members' committee assignments. Unlike other committees, positions on the intelligence committees are select assignments made by the leadership on each side in the House and Senate. The 9/11 Commission recommended changes to the intelligence committee structure in the U.S. Senate, where four of the members would be 'dual-hatted' on the Appropriations, Armed Services, Foreign Relations, and Judiciary committees. Commissioners thought this was important to ensure that the SSCI members included lawmakers familiar with the issues and interests that each of those four committees covers.

The United States House Permanent Select Committee on Intelligence (HPSCI): 22 members sit on the Committee, although this number has fluctuated in the past. This includes at least one member each from the House Appropriations, Armed Services, Judiciary, and Foreign Affairs Committees.

The United States Senate Select Committee on Intelligence (SSCI): 15 Senators sit on this committee, although this number also has fluctuated in the past. By rule, the majority party has eight members on the committee, regardless of the number of seats held by the majority in overall Senate. One seat from both the majority and minority party are reserved for standing committee members from Appropriations, Armed Services, Foreign Relations, and Judiciary. The Chairman and ranking member of the Armed Services Committees serve as ex officio members of the intelligence committees.

Congress has several other methods at its disposal for overseeing and controlling aspects of the intelligence community.

=== Budget process ===
The two main components of the budget process are that of appropriation (allocation of funds) and authorization (approving the use of funds for programs or activities).

The main authorizers of the intelligence budget are House Permanent Select Committee on Intelligence and the Senate Select Committee on Intelligence, other committees that authorize funds include The House Armed Services Committee and Senate Armed Services Committee. The Senate Appropriations Subcommittee on Defense and House Appropriations Subcommittee on Defense are the subcommittees who appropriate the funding.

The House Appropriations Select Intelligence Oversight Panel and the Senate Intelligence Appropriations Subcommittee were originally responsible for allocating funds to the intelligence community budget. This allows each of these committees to have some control over the intelligence community actions and have access to examine size, shape, organization and programs of the agencies. However, despite the Senate approving a resolution in 2004 to create a Senate Intelligence Appropriations Subcommittee, none exists. Recently, Senator Kit Bond has introduced Senate Resolution 655 in 2008 calling for the committee to be constituted. To date, no action by congress has been taken on the Bond resolution.

=== Hearings, investigations, and reports ===
Hearings are a means to request information from officials and experts. Hearings are usually adversarial in nature and try to ensure that the agencies comply with laws, and that administrative policies reflect the public interest. Oversight hearings inquire about the efficiency, financial system, and effectiveness of agency operations. Hearings may be closed to the public depending on the nature of the hearing. Following a hearing, questions for the record (QFRs or "kew-fers") may be submitted to witnesses and agencies.

Congress is allowed to investigate almost any and all issues, Congressional Committees have subpoena power. This compels the production of testimony or records, and failure to respond constitutes Contempt of Congress. Most Congressional investigations end with the Investigating Committee producing a report(s). Typically, there are two reports, one from the majority party and one from the minority party. However, there are times a single, bipartisan report is submitted. An example of a Congressional investigation into the Intelligence Community, is the Senate investigation on pre-war intelligence which produced the Report on Pre-War Intelligence on Iraq. Another example is the joint House and Senate Intelligence Committees inquiry after the September 11 attacks; the report produced presented the findings, conclusions, a discussion, and a series of recommendations. The effectiveness of Congressional investigations is often criticized because Congress through its budgetary powers and oversight responsibilities has influence over the community, and therefore the question becomes can Congress be objective about its own actions.

The Government Accountability Office (GAO) also known as the investigative arm of Congress, helps Congress with oversight of federal programs and provides Congress with insight into ways to make government more efficient, effective, ethical and equitable (it also provides forecasts of long-term trends and challenges) by producing reports.

=== Treaties, nominations, and hostages ===
The Senate has the power to confirm (or reject) Presidential nominations for appointed posts, which plenty of important posts in the intelligence are, such as the DNI and the DCIA. In this way, the Senate has power to reject unfit persons and hope to guide the intelligence community to whatever way they feel best.

The Senate also has the power to ratify treaties; this is important to the intelligence community because one of its functions is monitoring treaty compliance, for example during Soviet arms control of the 1970s the ability to monitor the Soviets compliance was only within the intelligence community. The senate select committee was given the task of examining whether the intelligence community could accurately monitor treaty compliance. Sometimes they can hold decisions on treaties until provisions are met such as the buying of new satellites before ratifying the 1988 Intermediate-Range Nuclear Forces Treaty

Hostages are one way that Congress can try to force the Executive branch into doing what Congress wants. Congress withholds making decisions or taking action on important things (such as approving nominations or ratifying treaties) to the executive branch in order to force the preferred action.

=== Legislative oversight issues ===
==== Redundancy ====
At the time the 9/11 Commission Report was issued in 2002, 17 congressional committees had some intelligence oversight duty, on at least one intelligence community member. (including but not limited to the Senate: Appropriations, Armed Services, Budget, Energy and Natural Resources, Foreign Relations, Governmental Affairs, Judiciary Standing Committees, and the Senate Select Committee on Intelligence; House: House Appropriations, Armed Services, Budget, Energy and Commerce, International Relations, and Judiciary Standing Committees and the House Permanent Select Committee on Intelligence). The 9/11 Commission report stated that redundancy in congressional oversight, through the multiple responsible committees, hindered the oversight process and was not conducive to the goals of oversight. The commission recommended to reduce redundancy, and to unify the congressional oversight community, for example creating a standing joint House/Senate Intelligence committee.

At this point, congress has not fully implemented the commission's suggestions. However, in October 2004, the Senate enacted a series of internal changes; it ended its eight-year term limits for members of its Intelligence Committee; elevated its Intelligence Committee to category "A" status (generally Senators can serve on no more than two "A" committees); created an Oversight Subcommittee of the Intelligence Committee; and established an Intelligence Subcommittee of its Appropriations Committee. In 2007, the House changed intelligence appropriations responsibilities and created the Appropriations Select Intelligence Oversight Panel.

Some Congressional members wish to consolidate oversight in keeping with the 9/11 Commission recommendations, such as Representative Carolyn Maloney, (D-NY), who, in 2004, proposed that the House shift the House Intelligence Committee status to a standing committee and giving it exclusive jurisdiction over the intelligence community. Conversely, others wish to diversify oversight responsibility to more committees such as, Representatives Jeff Flake (R-AZ) and Adam Schiff (D-CA) who in July 2006 introduced a bill that would require the House Intelligence Committee to disclose considerable classified information to at least eight other House committees.

Redundancy advocates argue that it reduces group think and favoritism; produces competition; and increases reliability by decreasing the chances of the system failing entirely. Consolidation advocates argue that consolidation would improve the accountability of both the intelligence community and Congress (for example, if multiple Committees failed to catch something it would be difficult to hold any one accountable) and it would reduce costs.

==== Secrecy ====
Members of Congress are not required to have security clearances. The Executive Branch, through E.O. 12333 as amended has chosen to control dissemination of information to only those with the need-to-know.

Because Members of Congress were elected to office, they do not have to submit to the background check procedures (Congressional Staff on the other hand must submit to background checks to handle classified materials). The House and the Senate limit dissemination of intelligence to members who are on the Intelligence Committees and many of their hearings are closed. Usually, the main concern is leaks of classified information. However, some argue that openness is a tenet of democracy and therefore operations and information must be openly available to the public. There are also concerns about whether Congress would be willing to make public alarming information. Subject to the law, the President of the United States may control the type and amount of classified information shared with Congress.

Under normal conditions, the President is required by Title 50 U.S.C. § 3091(a)(1) to "ensure that the congressional intelligence committees are kept fully and currently informed of the intelligence activities of the United States, including any significant anticipated intelligence activity as required by [the] title." However, under "extraordinary circumstances", when the President thinks "it is essential to limit access" to information about a covert action, the Gang of Eight shall be briefed instead.The Gang of Eight is a group bipartisan group of congressional leaders. Specifically, the Gang of Eight includes the leaders of each of the two parties from both the Senate and House of Representatives, and the chairs and ranking minority members of both the Senate Committee and House Committee for intelligence as set forth by 50 U.S.C. § 3093(c)(2).

Another secrecy issue is the intelligence budget. The Constitution in Article 1, Section 9, paragraph 7, requires accounts of all public money be published "from time to time." Many Administrations have argued using the vagueness of the statement, that disclosing intelligence budget figures would harm national security.

== Judicial oversight ==
The United States Foreign Intelligence Surveillance Court (FISC) is a U.S. federal court established and authorized under the Foreign Intelligence Surveillance Act of 1978 (FISA) to oversee requests for surveillance warrants against foreign spies inside the United States by federal law enforcement and intelligence agencies. Such requests are made most often by the National Security Agency (NSA) and the Federal Bureau of Investigation (FBI).
