= Scott Jones (Canadian civil servant) =

Canadian official

- Occupation: civil servant
- Known for: first director of the CCCS, a Canadian intelligence agency

Scott Jones is a Canadian official, who was appointed to head a cyber security agency, in 2018. His agency, the Canadian Centre for Cyber Security, will have 750 individuals in 2019.

Jones has Bachelor's degrees in Computer Science and Electronic Systems Engineering, and a Masters in Business Administration.

Jones first worked for the Communications Security Establishment in 1999. He has held a variety of appointments, at the Assistant Deputy Minister level, including serving as a security advisor at the Privy Council Office.

== Huawei position ==
Press reports have characterized Jones's position on allowing Chinese telecommunications giant Huawei to bid on Government contracts as being at odds with the position of his opposite numbers at Canada's allies' intelligence agencies.

Jones's testimony before the Standing Committee on Public Safety and National Security in September 2018. The Register characterized his confidence that Canadian precautions precluded the need for an outright ban on Huawei bidding on government contracts as a "dig" against his Australian opposite numbers.

United States Senators Marco Rubio and Mark Warner sent a letter to Prime Minister Justin Trudeau warning him Canada should not trust Huawei, triggered by Jones's testimony.
