= Claude Laferrière =

Canadian legal scholar and lecturer

- Born: July 20, 1953 (age 73); Canada
- Education: LL.M. (International Legal Studies); doctoral studies in philosophy on the simultaneity of space-time (Université Laval)
- Alma mater: Université de Montréal; Georgetown University Law Center
- Occupations: Lawyer; Lecturer
- Known for: Comparative national security law; French-language legal scholarship
- Awards: Correctional Services Distinguished Service Medal (2005); Queen Elizabeth II Diamond Jubilee Medal (2012)

Claude Laferrière (born 20 July 1953) is a Canadian lawyer, lecturer, and author specialising in national security law, constitutional law, and criminal law. He teaches at the Université de Montréal Faculty of Law and has also taught at Université Laval. Laferrière is known for authoring one of the most extensive French-language comparative works on national security and intelligence law in North America.

He was also involved in the leadership of the controversial Star 51 initiative during the 1990s, advocating for the annexation of Québec to the United States.

== Early life and education ==
Laferrière studied philosophy and law at the Université de Montréal, where he completed both bachelor's and master's degrees.

In 2007, he earned a Master of Laws (LL.M.) in International Legal Studies at the Georgetown University Law Center, with a concentration in U.S. and Canadian national security law.

He also studied briefly at McGill University and later completed doctoral-level studies in philosophy at Université Laval, focusing on the simultaneity of space-time continuum (la simultanéité de l’espace-temps), blending metaphysics, Bergsonian empiricism, and legal reasoning.

== Career ==
Laferrière has served as a lecturer at the Université de Montréal Faculty of Law, teaching courses in:

- National security law
- Constitutional law
- Criminal law
- International law
- Human rights and victims’ rights

He has also taught at Université Laval.

Outside academia, he practised law in Québec, focusing on constitutional, business, and criminal litigation. Laferrière is known for integrating comparative and international dimensions into his legal commentary, particularly in francophone circles.

Since 2012, he has contributed legal commentary and opinion articles to La Presse, Le Devoir, Huffington Post Québec, and Huffington Post Canada, writing in both French and English.

In 2014, Laferrière appeared as a legal advisor in international law in the SRC investigative program Enquête, hosted by Anne Panasuk. The segment, entitled Condamné au silence, explored the kidnapping and torture of a Canadian engineer by Algerian intelligence services.

In 2017, he was interviewed by journalist Anne-Marie Dussault on SRC's 24/60 news program, where he provided analysis of the U.S. Foreign Intelligence Surveillance Act (FISA) and the operation of the Foreign Intelligence Surveillance Court (FISC) in the context of President Donald Trump's wiretapping allegations.

Laferrière was also a guest speaker at the Institut militaire de Québec in 2012 and 2015, invited by retired French Army General René Dequen. His lectures covered American national security themes including narcoterrorism, the President as Commander in Chief, and the strategic use of unmanned aerial vehicles (drones).

He has received national recognition for his public service. He was awarded the Correctional Services Distinguished Service Medal in 2005 and the Queen Elizabeth II Diamond Jubilee Medal in 2012, in recognition of his work with the Correctional Service of Canada and his advocacy for victims of crime.

== Publications ==
=== Books ===
- Traité de droit de la sécurité nationale : États-Unis d’Amérique / Canada (2018; rev. ed. 2022). Montréal: Wilson & Lafleur. Approx. 1 100 pages. A comprehensive comparative study of U.S. and Canadian national security law.
- Five Essays on U.S. National Security Law (2009). Montréal: Wilson & Lafleur.
- L’Expérience Tremblay (publication date unknown). A biographical study of former Montréal mayor and lawyer Me Gérald Tremblay.

== Research and scholarship ==
Laferrière’s academic research focuses on:

- National security and intelligence law
- Surveillance and emergency powers
- Constitutional litigation and Charter rights
- Comparative public law
- International human rights law

He is particularly influenced by the works of philosopher Henri Bergson and the tradition of logical empiricism.

His legal writings have been referenced by francophone legal practitioners and incorporated into Québec legal education, particularly in comparative and international security law courses.

== Honours and decorations ==
- Médaille pour services distingués en milieu correctionnel (2005) – awarded by the Governor General of Canada for distinguished service within the Correctional Service of Canada.
- Médaille du jubilé de diamant de la Reine Elizabeth II (2012) – presented to mark the 60th anniversary of the accession of Queen Elizabeth II, in recognition of community and professional contributions.

== See also ==
- Canadian constitutional law
