= Sir Leonard Tilley Building =

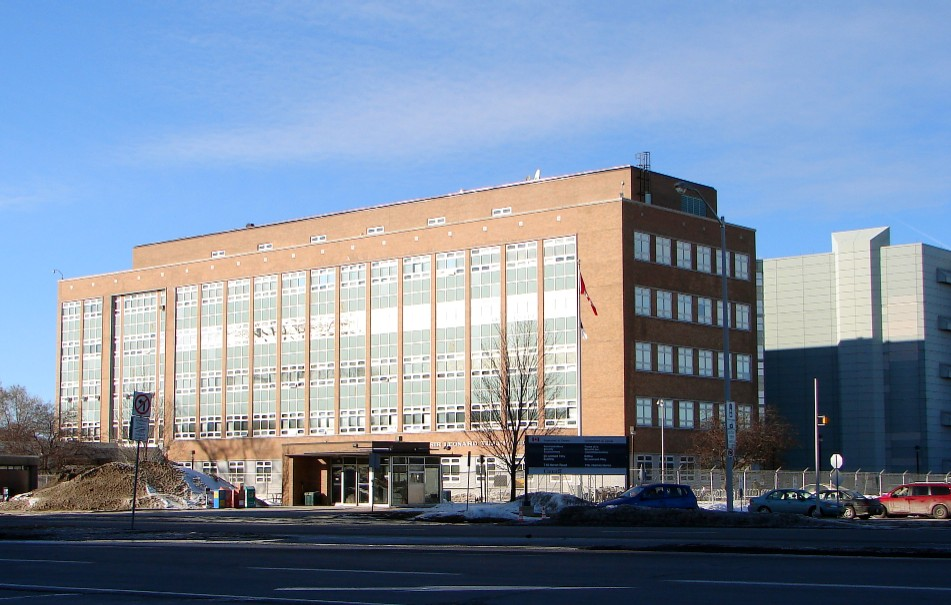
- Interactive map of the Sir Leonard Tilley Building area

General information
- Type: Canadian government office
- Location: Ottawa, Ontario, Canada, 719 Heron Road
- Coordinates: 45.37847°N 75.687223°W
- Completed: 1961
- Client: Canadian government
- Owner: Public Works and Government Services Canada

Technical details
- Floor area: 23,832 m^{2} (256,530 sq ft)

The Sir Leonard Tilley Building and Annex (French: Édifice Sir-Leonard-Tilley), is a Government of Canada office building property consisting of two buildings and operated by the Public Works and Government Services Canada and located at 719 Heron Road in Ottawa, Ontario, Canada. It was designed by architect Jean-Serge Le Fort. The floor space covers 23,832 square metres and the land area covers 4.527 hectares. Until 2015, the building housed the headquarters of the Communications Security Establishment (CSE). This building was named in honour of Samuel Leonard Tilley, federal Finance Minister in 1873–1878.

The completion of a new headquarters building on Ogilvie Road led the CSE to vacate the building by 2016. Public Works Canada is preparing the buildings to allow other government departments to take their place. The Department of National Defence determined the facilities did not meet their needs but Corrections Canada, the Canada Revenue Agency and the Canada Border Services Agency were indicated as possible future tenants. The entry of new tenants is planned to be phased in over 2018–19. The cost of refurbishing the buildings to meet new standards, or Workplace 2.0, will cost about $400 million.
