= Civilian Review and Complaints Commission for the Royal Canadian Mounted Police =

Canadian police watchdog organization

The Civilian Review and Complaints Commission for the Royal Canadian Mounted Police (CRCC, French: La Commission civile d’examen et de traitement des plaintes relatives à la GRC) is an independent agency. Created by Parliament in 1988, the Commission ensures that public complaints made about the conduct of RCMP members are examined fairly and impartially. The Commission receives complaints from the public and conducts reviews when complainants are not satisfied with the RCMP’s handling of their complaints.

The Commission is not part of the RCMP.

In 2022, the government proposed a plan to reform the commission into the proposed "Public Complaints and Review Commission" and to assign the new commission the added responsibility of overseeing complaints against the Canada Border Services Agency.

== Mandate ==
As set out in Parts VI and VII of the Royal Canadian Mounted Police Act, the mandate of the Commission is to:

- receive complaints from the public about the conduct of RCMP members;
- conduct reviews when complainants are not satisfied with the RCMP's handling of their complaints;
- initiate complaints and investigations into RCMP conduct when it is in the public interest to do so;
- review specified activities;
- report findings and make recommendations; and
- promote public awareness of the complaint process.

== Guiding Principles ==
- Impartial and independent
- Accountable to the Canadian public
- Fair, equitable and credible in addressing complaints and conducting reviews, investigations and hearings
- Timely and efficient complaint process
- Foster a respectful, productive and healthy workplace
- Foster public awareness of the complaint process
- Representative of people served

== Resources ==
- CRCC Website
- Complaint and Review Process
- Complaint and Review Process Flowchart
- Jurisdiction
- Enhancing Royal Canadian Mounted Police Accountability Act
- Royal Canadian Mounted Police Act
