= Executive Order 13388 =

2005 United States executive order

President George W. Bush signed Executive Order 13388 on October 25, 2005. Its title is "Further Strengthening the Sharing of Terrorism Information To Protect Americans."

The executive order directs federal agencies to enhance their sharing of information on suspicions of terrorism. It also rewords the directives to intelligence agencies that instructed them to report to the Director of Central Intelligence to report instead to the Director of National Intelligence.

The Federation of American Scientists describes the order as a response to Section 1016 of the Intelligence Reform and Terrorism Prevention Act of 2004, the report of the 9/11 Commission, and to the perception that intelligence agencies were "over-classifying" secrets.

This executive order superseded Executive Order 13356.
