= Lists of Privy Counsellors =

These are lists of privy counsellors of England, Great Britain and the United Kingdom from the reorganisation in 1679 of His Majesty's Most Honourable Privy Council to the present day. Members of the Privy Council of Ireland between 1660 and 1922, the Privy Council of Northern Ireland, and of the Privy Council of Canada are also listed. Privy councils provide advice to the monarch of Canada on state and constitutional affairs.

== Privy Council of England and Great Britain ==
- List of Privy Counsellors (1679–1714)
- List of Privy Counsellors (1714–1820)

== Privy Council of the United Kingdom ==
- List of Privy Counsellors (1820–1837)
- List of Privy Counsellors (1837–1901)
- List of Privy Counsellors (1901–1910)
- List of Privy Counsellors (1910–1936)
- List of Privy Counsellors (1936–1952)
- List of Privy Counsellors (1952–2022)
- List of Privy Counsellors (2022–present)

== Privy Council of Ireland ==
- List of Privy Counsellors of Ireland (1660–1922)

== Privy Council of Northern Ireland ==
- List of Privy Counsellors of Northern Ireland (1922–1971)

== Privy Council of Canada ==
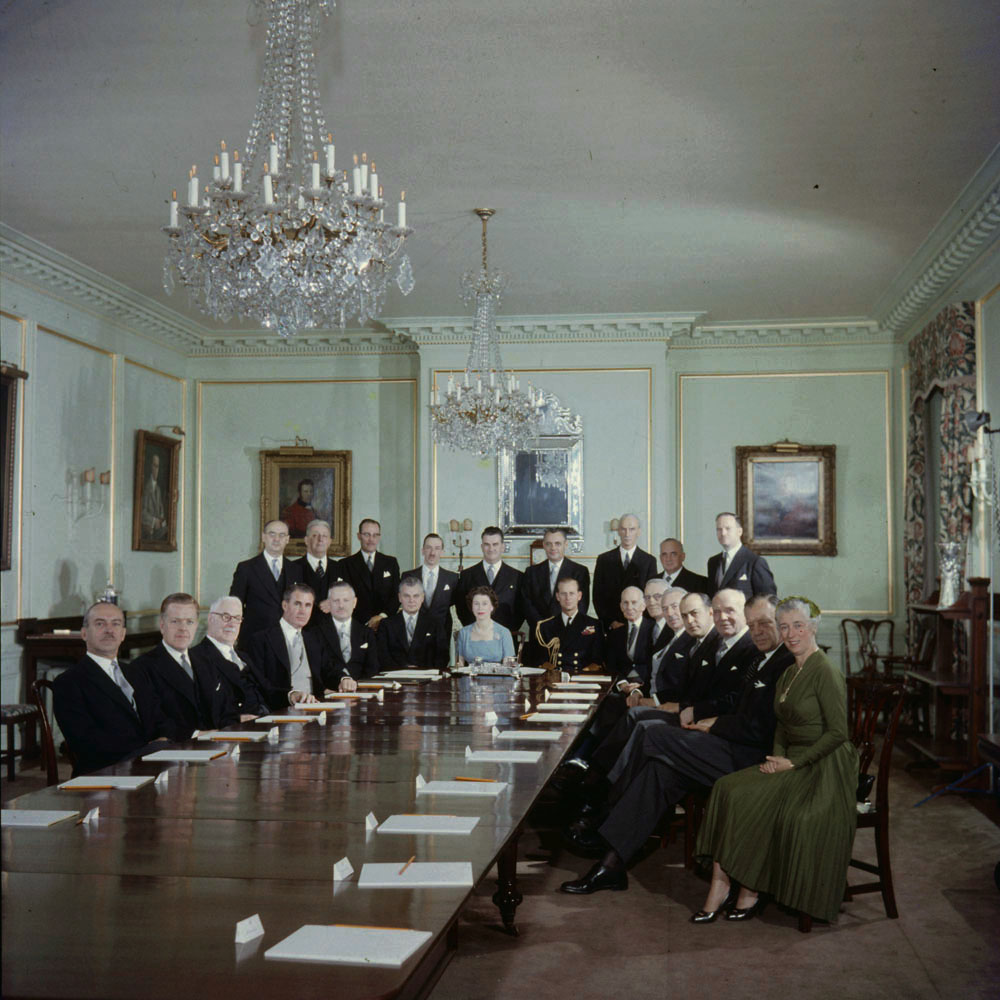
Elizabeth II and federal Cabinet (1957)

- List of members of the Privy Council for Canada (1867–1911)
- List of members of the Privy Council for Canada (1911–48)
- List of members of the Privy Council for Canada (1948–68)
- List of members of the Privy Council for Canada (1968–2005)
- List of members of the Privy Council for Canada (2006–present)

== See also ==
- List of Royal members of the Privy Council
- List of current members of the Privy Council

== Sources ==
- Leigh Rayment's Privy Council Page
- Haydn, Joseph Timothy and Ockerby, Horace. The Book of Dignities, 3rd ed. (1894, reprinted Baltimore, 1970).
