= List of members of the Privy Council for Canada (1968–2005) =

Members of the Queen's Privy Council for Canada appointed between 1968 and 2005.

== By Ministry ==
=== P. E. Trudeau ===
- The Honourable Donald Stovel Macdonald (from April 20, 1968)
- The Honourable John Carr Munro (from April 20, 1968)
- The Honourable Gérard Pelletier (from April 20, 1968)
- The Honourable John (Jack) Davis (from April 26, 1968)
- The Honourable Horace Andrew Olson (from July 6, 1968)
- The Honourable John-Eudes Dubé (from July 6, 1968)
- The Honourable Stanley Ronald Basford (from July 6, 1968)
- The Honourable Donald Campbell Jamieson (from July 6, 1968)
- The Honourable Eric William Kierans (from July 6, 1968)
- The Honourable Robert Knight Andras (from July 6, 1968)
- The Honourable James Armstrong Richardson (from July 6, 1968)
- The Honourable Otto Emil Lang (from July 6, 1968)
- The Honourable Sydney John Smith (from October 10, 1968)
- The Right Honourable Herbert Eser Gray (from October 20, 1969)
- The Honourable Robert Douglas George Stanbury (from October 20, 1969)
- The Right Honourable J.H. Gérald Fauteux (from March 23, 1970)
- The Honourable Jean-Pierre Goyer (from December 22, 1970)
- The Honourable Alastair Gillespie (from August 12, 1971)
- The Honourable Martin Patrick O'Connell (from August 12, 1971)
- The Honourable Pat Mahoney (from January 28, 1972)
- The Honourable Stanley Haidasz (from November 27, 1972)
- The Honourable Eugene Francis Whelan (from November 27, 1972)
- The Honourable William Warren Allmand (from November 27, 1972)
- The Honourable James Hugh Faulkner (from November 27, 1972)
- The Honourable André Ouellet (from November 27, 1972)
- The Honourable Daniel Joseph MacDonald (from November 27, 1972)
- The Honourable Marc Lalonde (from November 27, 1972)
- The Right Honourable Jeanne Mathilde Sauvé (from November 27, 1972)
- The Right Honourable Bora Laskin (from January 7, 1974)
- The Honourable Lucien Lamoureux (from June 10, 1974)
- The Honourable Raymond Joseph Perrault (from August 8, 1974)
- The Honourable Barnett Jerome Danson (from August 8, 1974)
- The Honourable J. Judd Buchanan (from August 8, 1974)
- The Right Honourable Roméo A. LeBlanc (from August 8, 1974)
- The Honourable Muriel McQueen Fergusson (from November 7, 1974)
- The Honourable Pierre Juneau (from August 29, 1975)
- The Honourable Marcel Lessard (from September 26, 1975)
- The Honourable Jack Sydney George Cullen (from September 26, 1975)
- The Honourable Leonard Stephen Marchand (from September 15, 1976)
- The Honourable John Roberts (from September 15, 1976)
- The Honourable Monique Bégin (from September 15, 1976)
- The Honourable Jean-Jacques Blais (from September 15, 1976)
- The Honourable Francis Fox (from September 15, 1976)
- The Honourable Anthony Chisholm Abbott (from September 15, 1976)
- The Honourable Iona Campagnolo (from September 15, 1976)
- The Honourable Joseph-Philippe Guay (from November 3, 1976)
- The Honourable John Henry Horner (from April 21, 1977)
- The Honourable Norman A. Cafik (from September 16, 1977)
- The Honourable J. Gilles Lamontagne (from January 19, 1978)
- The Honourable John Mercer Reid (from November 24, 1978)
- The Honourable Pierre de Bané (from November 24, 1978)
- The Right Honourable Jules Léger (from June 1, 1979)

=== Clark ===
- The Right Honourable Charles Joseph Clark (from June 4, 1979)
- The Honourable Walter David Baker (from June 4, 1979)
- The Honourable Flora Isabel MacDonald (from June 4, 1979)
- The Honourable James Aloysius McGrath (from June 4, 1979)
- The Honourable Erik H. Nielsen (from June 4, 1979)
- The Honourable Allan Frederick Lawrence (from June 4, 1979)
- The Honourable John Carnell Crosbie (from June 4, 1979)
- The Honourable David Samuel Horne MacDonald (from June 4, 1979)
- The Honourable Lincoln MacCauley Alexander (from June 4, 1979)
- The Honourable Roch LaSalle (from June 4, 1979)
- The Right Honourable Donald Frank Mazankowski (from June 4, 1979)
- The Honourable Elmer MacIntosh MacKay (from June 4, 1979)
- The Honourable Arthur Jacob Epp (from June 4, 1979)
- The Honourable John Allen Fraser (from June 4, 1979)
- The Honourable William H. Jarvis (from June 4, 1979)
- The Honourable Allan Bruce McKinnon (from June 4, 1979)
- The Honourable Sinclair McKnight Stevens (from June 4, 1979)
- The Honourable John Wise (from June 4, 1979)
- The Honourable Ronald George Atkey (from June 4, 1979)
- The Right Honourable Ramon John Hnatyshyn (from June 4, 1979)
- The Honourable David Edward Crombie (from June 4, 1979)
- The Honourable Robert René de Cotret (from June 4, 1979)
- The Honourable William Heward Grafftey (from June 4, 1979)
- The Honourable Henry Perrin Beatty (from June 4, 1979)
- The Honourable J. Robert Howie (from June 4, 1979)
- The Honourable Steven Eugene Paproski (from June 4, 1979)
- The Honourable Arthur Ronald Huntington (from June 4, 1979)
- The Honourable Michael Holcombe Wilson (from June 4, 1979)
- The Honourable Renaude Lapointe (from November 30, 1979)
- The Honourable Stanley Howard Knowles (from November 30, 1979)

=== P. E. Trudeau ===
- The Honourable Hazen Robert Argue (from March 3, 1980)
- The Honourable Gerald Regan (from March 3, 1980)
- The Honourable Mark R. MacGuigan (from March 3, 1980)
- The Honourable Robert Phillip Kaplan (from March 3, 1980)
- The Honourable James Sydney Clark Fleming (from March 3, 1980)
- The Honourable William H. Rompkey (from March 3, 1980)
- The Honourable Pierre Bussières (from March 3, 1980)
- The Honourable Charles Lapointe (from March 3, 1980)
- The Honourable Edward C. Lumley (from March 3, 1980)
- The Honourable Yvon Pinard (from March 3, 1980)
- The Honourable Donald James Johnston (from March 3, 1980)
- The Honourable Lloyd Axworthy (from March 3, 1980)
- The Honourable Paul James Cosgrove (from March 3, 1980)
- The Honourable Judy Erola (from March 3, 1980)
- The Honourable James Jerome (from February 16, 1981)
- The Honourable Allister Grosart (from February 16, 1981)
- The Honourable Jacob Austin (from September 22, 1981)
- The Honourable Charles L. Caccia (from September 22, 1981)
- The Honourable Serge Joyal (from September 22, 1981)
- The Honourable W. Bennett Campbell (from September 22, 1981)
- The Honourable Robert Gordon Robertson (from March 2, 1982)
- The Honourable John Edward Broadbent (from April 17, 1982)
- The Honourable Richard Bennett Hatfield (from April 17, 1982)
- The Honourable William Grenville Davis (from April 17, 1982)
- The Honourable Allan Emrys Blakeney (from April 17, 1982)
- The Honourable E. Peter Lougheed (from April 17, 1982)
- The Honourable William Richards Bennett (from April 17, 1982)
- The Honourable John MacLennan Buchanan (from April 17, 1982)
- The Honourable Alfred Brian Peckford (from April 17, 1982)
- The Honourable James Matthew Lee (from April 17, 1982)
- The Honourable Howard Russell Pawley (from April 17, 1982)
- The Honourable Sterling Rufus Lyon (from April 17, 1982)
- The Honourable David Michael Collenette (from August 12, 1983)
- The Honourable Céline Hervieux-Payette (from August 12, 1983)
- The Honourable Roger Simmons (from August 12, 1983)
- The Honourable David Paul Smith (from August 12, 1983)
- The Honourable Roy MacLaren (from August 17, 1983)
- The Honourable Joseph Mario Jacques Olivier (from January 10, 1984)
- The Right Honourable Robert George Brian Dickson (from April 19, 1984)
- The Honourable Robert B. Bryce (from April 19, 1984)
- The Honourable Peter Michael Pitfield (from April 19, 1984)
- The Right Honourable Martin Brian Mulroney (from May 7, 1984)
- The Right Honourable Edward Richard Schreyer (from June 3, 1984)

=== Turner ===
- The Honourable Herb Breau (from June 30, 1984)
- The Honourable Joseph Roger Rémi Bujold (from June 30, 1984)
- The Honourable Jean-C. Lapierre (from June 30, 1984)
- The Honourable Ralph Ferguson (from June 30, 1984)
- The Honourable Douglas Cockburn Frith (from June 30, 1984)

=== Mulroney ===
- The Honourable Robert Carman Coates (from September 17, 1984)
- The Honourable Jack Burnett Murta (from September 17, 1984)
- The Honourable Harvie Andre (from September 17, 1984)
- The Honourable Otto John Jelinek (from September 17, 1984)
- The Honourable Thomas Edward Siddon (from September 17, 1984)
- The Honourable Charles James Mayer (from September 17, 1984)
- The Honourable William Hunter McKnight (from September 17, 1984)
- The Honourable Reverend Walter Franklin McLean (from September 17, 1984)
- The Honourable Thomas McMillan (from September 17, 1984)
- The Honourable Patricia Carney (from September 17, 1984)
- The Honourable André Bissonnette (from September 17, 1984)
- The Honourable Suzanne Blais-Grenier (from September 17, 1984)
- The Honourable Benoît Bouchard (from September 17, 1984)
- The Honourable Andrée Champagne (from September 17, 1984)
- The Honourable Michel Côté (from September 17, 1984)
- The Honourable James Francis Kelleher (from September 17, 1984)
- The Honourable Robert E. J. Layton (from September 17, 1984)
- The Honourable Marcel Masse (from September 17, 1984)
- The Honourable Barbara Jean McDougall (from September 17, 1984)
- The Honourable Gerald Merrithew (from September 17, 1984)
- The Honourable Monique Vézina (from September 17, 1984)
- The Honourable Thomas Clement Douglas (from November 30, 1984)
- The Honourable Maurice Riel (from November 30, 1984)
- The Honourable Cyril Lloyd Francis (from November 30, 1984)
- The Honourable Saul Mark Cherniack (from November 30, 1984)
- The Honourable Paule Gauthier (from November 30, 1984)
- The Honourable Eugene Alfred Forsey (from June 10, 1985)
- The Honourable Lloyd Roseville Crouse (from June 10, 1985)
- The Honourable Stewart Donald McInnes (from August 20, 1985)
- The Honourable Frank Oberle (from November 20, 1985)
- The Honourable Gordon Francis Joseph Osbaldeston (from February 13, 1986)
- The Honourable Lowell Murray (from June 30, 1986)
- The Honourable Paul Wyatt Dick (from June 30, 1986)
- The Honourable Pierre H. Cadieux (from June 30, 1986)
- The Honourable Jean J. Charest (from June 30, 1986)
- The Honourable Thomas Hockin (from June 30, 1986)
- The Honourable Monique Landry (from June 30, 1986)
- The Honourable Bernard Valcourt (from June 30, 1986)
- The Honourable Gerry Weiner (from June 30, 1986)
- The Honourable John William Bosley (from June 30, 1986)
- The Honourable Douglas Grinslade Lewis (from August 27, 1987)
- The Honourable Pierre Blais (from August 27, 1987)
- The Honourable Gerry St. Germain (from March 31, 1988)
- The Honourable Lucien Bouchard (from March 31, 1988)
- The Honourable John Horton McDermid (from September 15, 1988)
- The Honourable Shirley Martin (from September 15, 1988)
- The Honourable Mary Collins (from January 30, 1989)
- The Honourable Alan Redway (from January 30, 1989)
- The Honourable William Charles Winegard (from January 30, 1989)
- The Right Honourable A. Kim Campbell (from January 30, 1989)
- The Honourable Jean Corbeil (from January 30, 1989)
- The Honourable Gilles Loiselle (from January 30, 1989)
- The Honourable John White Hughes Bassett (from November 30, 1989)
- The Honourable Marcel Danis (from February 23, 1990)
- The Honourable David Arnold Croll (from March 21, 1990)
- The Right Honourable Joseph Antonio Charles Lamer (from July 3, 1990)
- The Honourable Audrey McLaughlin (from January 10, 1991)
- The Honourable Pauline Browes (from April 21, 1991)
- The Honourable Edmond Jacques Courtois (from December 5, 1991)
- The Honourable J. J. Michel Robert (from December 5, 1991)
- The Honourable Marcel Prud'homme (from July 1, 1992)
- The Honourable William C. Scott (from July 1, 1992)
- The Honourable Lorne Edmund Nystrom (from July 1, 1992)
- The Honourable Gerhard Herzberg (from July 1, 1992)
- The Honourable Arthur Tremblay (from July 1, 1992)
- The Honourable David Alexander Colville (from July 1, 1992)
- The Honourable Pauline Jewett (from July 1, 1992)
- The Honourable Paul Desmarais (from July 1, 1992)
- The Honourable John Charles Polanyi (from July 1, 1992)
- The Honourable Maurice F. Strong (from July 1, 1992)
- The Honourable Antonine Maillet (from July 1, 1992)
- The Honourable Rita Joe (from July 1, 1992)
- The Honourable James Bourque (from July 1, 1992)
- The Honourable Richard Cashin (from July 1, 1992)
- The Honourable Paul M. Tellier (from July 1, 1992)
- The Honourable Patricia Helen Rogers (from July 1, 1992)
- The Honourable David Robert Peterson (from July 1, 1992)
- ~~The Honourable~~ Conrad M. Black (from July 1, 1992; expelled January 31, 2014)
- The Honourable Charles Rosner Bronfman (from October 21, 1992)
- The Honourable Maurice Richard (from October 30, 1992)
- The Honourable W. O. Mitchell (from November 5, 1992)
- The Honourable Edwin A. Goodman (from November 30, 1992)
- The Honourable George W. Vari (from December 23, 1992)
- The Honourable Pierre H. Vincent (from January 4, 1993)
- The Honourable Rosemary Brown (from April 20, 1993)

=== Campbell ===
- The Honourable Jim Edwards (from June 25, 1993)
- The Honourable Robert Douglas Nicholson (from June 25, 1993)
- The Honourable Barbara Jane Sparrow (from June 25, 1993)
- The Honourable Peter L. McCreath (from June 25, 1993)
- The Honourable Ian Angus Ross Reid (from June 25, 1993)
- The Honourable Larry Schneider (from June 25, 1993)
- The Honourable Garth Turner (from June 25, 1993)

=== Chrétien ===
- The Honourable David Anderson (from November 4, 1993)
- The Honourable Ralph E. Goodale (from November 4, 1993)
- The Honourable David Charles Dingwall (from November 4, 1993)
- The Honourable Ron Irwin (from November 4, 1993)
- The Honourable Brian Tobin (from November 4, 1993)
- The Honourable Joyce Fairbairn (from November 4, 1993)
- The Honourable Sheila Maureen Copps (from November 4, 1993)
- The Honourable Sergio Marchi (from November 4, 1993)
- The Honourable John Manley (from November 4, 1993)
- The Honourable Diane Marleau (from November 4, 1993)
- The Right Honourable Paul Martin (from November 4, 1993)
- The Honourable Douglas Young (from November 4, 1993)
- The Honourable Michel Dupuy (from November 4, 1993)
- The Honourable Arthur C. Eggleton (from November 4, 1993)
- The Honourable Marcel Massé (from November 4, 1993)
- The Honourable Anne McLellan (from November 4, 1993)
- The Honourable Allan Rock (from November 4, 1993)
- The Honourable Sheila Finestone (from November 4, 1993)
- The Honourable Fernand Robichaud (from November 4, 1993)
- The Honourable Ethel Blondin-Andrew (from November 4, 1993)
- The Honourable Lawrence MacAulay (from November 4, 1993)
- The Honourable Christine Stewart (from November 4, 1993)
- The Honourable Raymond Chan (from November 4, 1993)
- The Honourable Jon Gerrard (from November 4, 1993)
- The Honourable Douglas Peters (from November 4, 1993)
- The Honourable Alfonso Gagliano (from September 15, 1994)
- The Honourable Lucienne Robillard (from February 22, 1995)
- The Honourable Fred J. Mifflin (from January 25, 1996)
- The Honourable Jane Stewart (from January 25, 1996)
- The Honourable Stéphane Dion (from January 25, 1996)
- The Honourable Pierre Pettigrew (from January 25, 1996)
- The Honourable Martin Cauchon (from January 25, 1996)
- The Honourable Hedy Fry (from January 25, 1996)
- The Honourable James Andrew Grant (from September 30, 1996)
- The Honourable Don Boudria (from October 4, 1996)
- The Honourable Guy Charbonneau (from October 17, 1996)
- The Honourable Bernard Alasdair Graham (from June 11, 1997)
- The Honourable Lyle Vanclief (from June 11, 1997)
- The Honourable Herb Dhaliwal (from June 11, 1997)
- The Honourable Andy Scott (from June 11, 1997)
- The Honourable David Kilgour (from June 11, 1997)
- The Honourable James Scott Peterson (from June 11, 1997)
- The Honourable Ronald J. Duhamel (from June 11, 1997)
- The Honourable Andrew Mitchell (from June 11, 1997)
- The Honourable Gilbert Normand (from June 18, 1997)
- The Honourable Robert Keith Rae (from April 30, 1998)
- The Honourable Claudette Bradshaw (from November 23, 1998)
- The Honourable Jocelyne Bourgon (from December 14, 1998)
- The Honourable Raymond A. Speaker (from June 9, 1999)
- The Honourable Frank Joseph McKenna (from June 9, 1999)
- The Honourable George Baker (from August 3, 1999)
- The Honourable Robert Daniel Nault (from August 3, 1999)
- The Honourable Maria Minna (from August 3, 1999)
- The Honourable Elinor Caplan (from August 3, 1999)
- The Honourable Denis Coderre (from August 3, 1999)
- The Honourable J. Bernard Boudreau (from October 4, 1999)
- The Right Honourable Beverley M. McLachlin (from January 12, 2000)
- The Honourable Sharon Carstairs (from January 9, 2001)
- The Honourable Robert G. Thibault (from January 9, 2001)
- The Honourable Rey Pagtakhan (from January 9, 2001)
- The Honourable Gilbert Parent (from June 5, 2001)
- The Honourable Gary Albert Filmon (from October 4, 2001)
- The Honourable Susan Whelan (from January 15, 2002)
- The Honourable Maurizio Bevilacqua (from January 15, 2002)
- The Honourable Paul DeVillers (from January 15, 2002)
- The Honourable Gar Knutson (from January 15, 2002)
- The Honourable Denis Paradis (from January 15, 2002)
- The Honourable Claude Drouin (from January 15, 2002)
- The Honourable John McCallum (from January 15, 2002)
- The Honourable Stephen Owen (from January 15, 2002)
- The Honourable William Graham (from January 15, 2002)
- The Honourable Gerry Byrne (from January 15, 2002)
- The Honourable Jean Augustine (from May 26, 2002)
- The Honourable Arnold Wayne Easter (from October 22, 2002)
- The Honourable Baljit Singh Chadha (from February 20, 2003)
- The Honourable Steven W. Mahoney (from April 11, 2003)
- The Honourable Roy J. Romanow (from November 13, 2003)

=== Martin ===
- The Honourable Albina Guarnieri (from December 12, 2003)
- The Honourable Stanley Kazmierczak Keyes (from December 12, 2003)
- The Honourable Joseph McGuire (from December 12, 2003)
- The Honourable Robert Speller (from December 12, 2003)
- The Honourable Reginald B. Alcock (from December 12, 2003)
- The Honourable Geoff Regan (from December 12, 2003)
- The Honourable Tony Valeri (from December 12, 2003)
- The Honourable M. Aileen Carroll (from December 12, 2003)
- The Honourable David Pratt (from December 12, 2003)
- The Honourable Irwin Cotler (from December 12, 2003)
- The Honourable Judy Sgro (from December 12, 2003)
- The Honourable Hélène Chalifour Scherrer (from December 12, 2003)
- The Honourable Ruben John Efford (from December 12, 2003)
- The Honourable Liza Frulla (from December 12, 2003)
- The Honourable Joseph Robert Comuzzi (from December 12, 2003)
- The Honourable Giuseppe (Joseph) Volpe (from December 12, 2003)
- The Honourable Mauril Bélanger (from December 12, 2003)
- The Honourable Carolyn Bennett (from December 12, 2003)
- The Honourable Jacques Saada (from December 12, 2003)
- The Honourable Joseph Frank Fontana (from December 12, 2003)
- The Honourable John Ferguson Godfrey (from December 12, 2003)
- The Honourable Scott Brison (from December 12, 2003)
- The Honourable Serge Marcil (from December 12, 2003)
- The Honourable John McKay (from December 12, 2003)
- The Honourable Jerry Pickard (from December 12, 2003)
- The Honourable Yvon Charbonneau (from December 12, 2003)
- The Honourable Gurbax Singh Malhi (from December 12, 2003)
- The Honourable John Harvard (from December 12, 2003)
- The Honourable Larry Bagnell (from December 12, 2003)
- The Honourable Brenda Kay Chamberlain (from December 12, 2003)
- The Honourable Walt Lastewka (from December 12, 2003)
- The Honourable Dan McTeague (from December 12, 2003)
- The Honourable Mark Eyking (from December 12, 2003)
- The Honourable Georges Farrah (from December 12, 2003)
- The Honourable Eleni Bakopanos (from December 12, 2003)
- The Honourable Paul Bonwick (from December 12, 2003)
- The Honourable Joe Jordan (from December 12, 2003)
- The Honourable Shawn Murphy (from December 12, 2003)
- The Honourable Jim Karygiannis (from December 12, 2003)
- The Honourable David Price (from December 12, 2003)
- The Honourable Roger Gallaway (from December 12, 2003)
- The Honourable Susan Barnes (from December 12, 2003)
- The Honourable André Harvey (from December 12, 2003)
- The Honourable Andrew Telegdi (from January 30, 2004)
- The Honourable Rev. William Alexander Blaikie (from February 19, 2004)
- The Honourable Grant Hill (from February 19, 2004)
- The Right Honourable Stephen Joseph Harper (from May 4, 2004)
- The Honourable Joseph Mario Jacques Olivier (from May 5, 2004)
- The Honourable Peter Adams (from July 20, 2004)
- The Honourable Sarmite Bulte (from July 20, 2004)
- The Honourable Roy Cullen (from July 20, 2004)
- The Honourable Ujjal Dosanjh (from July 20, 2004)
- The Honourable Ken Dryden (from July 20, 2004)
- The Honourable David Emerson (from July 20, 2004)
- The Honourable Tony Ianno (from July 20, 2004)
- The Honourable Marlene Jennings (from July 20, 2004)
- The Honourable Dominic LeBlanc (from July 20, 2004)
- The Honourable Judi Longfield (from July 20, 2004)
- The Honourable Paul Macklin (from July 20, 2004)
- The Honourable Keith P. Martin (from July 20, 2004)
- The Honourable Karen Redman (from July 20, 2004)
- The Honourable Raymond Simard (from July 20, 2004)
- The Honourable Patricia Anne Torsney (from July 20, 2004)
- The Honourable Bryon Wilfert (from July 20, 2004)
- The Honourable Jack Gilbert Layton (from March 21, 2005)
- The Honourable Belinda Stronach (from May 17, 2005)
- The Honourable Aldéa Landry, Q.C. (from June 24, 2005)
- The Right Honourable Adrienne Clarkson (from October 3, 2005)
- The Honourable Navdeep Bains (from October 7, 2005)
- The Honourable Charles Hubbard (from October 7, 2005)
- The Honourable Anita Neville (from October 18, 2005)

== See also ==
- List of current members of the King's Privy Council for Canada
- List of members of the Privy Council for Canada (1867–1911)
- List of members of the Privy Council for Canada (1911–1948)
- List of members of the Privy Council for Canada (1948–1968)
- List of members of the Privy Council for Canada (2006–present)
