= Robert Charles Matthews =

Canadian politician

The Hon. Robert Charles Matthews

Member of the Canadian Parliament for Toronto East Centre
- In office 1926–1935
- Preceded by: Edmund Bristol
- Succeeded by: District was abolished in 1933

Personal details
- Born: June 14, 1871 Lindsay, Ontario, Canada
- Died: September 19, 1952 (aged 81)
- Party: Conservative
- Education: Trinity College, Toronto; Harvard University
- Cabinet: Minister of National Revenue (1933-1935)

Robert Charles Matthews, PC (June 14, 1871 – September 19, 1952) was a Canadian politician.

Born in Lindsay, Ontario, Matthews came from a background where public service to others was lauded as a worthy pursuit.

The Honourable Robert Charles Matthews received his B.A. from Trinity College, University of Toronto. Further business studies took Matthews to Harvard University where he attended the Harvard Graduate School of Arts and Science in the 1901–1902 academic year. He was the second President (1910) of the Harvard Club in Toronto, which he helped to co-found in 1904.

After many years in the investment and banking sectors, Matthews turned his hand to politics. He was elected to the House of Commons of Canada representing the riding of Toronto East Centre in the 1926 Canadian federal election as a Conservative under the Cabinet of W. L. Mackenzie King. Re-elected in the 1930 Canadian federal election under the cabinet of R. B. Bennett, from December 1933 to August 1935, Matthews was the Minister of National Revenue. He was asked to continue for a second term but declined due to health concerns. In addition Matthews was appointed a member of The Queen's Privy Council, December 1933. He was the 1936 President of The Canadian Chamber of Commerce.

Matthews enjoyed nautical pursuits and supporting Canadian cricket in both Canada and England. He sponsored the Canadian Cricket Association's 1936 tour of England, where the Canadian team beat Marylebone Cricket Club at Lord's.
