= List of members of the Privy Council for Canada (1911–1948) =

This is a list of members of the King's Privy Council for Canada appointed from 1911 to 1948.

== Ministry ==
=== Borden ===
- The Right Honourable Sir Robert Laird Borden (from October 10, 1911)
- The Right Honourable Sir George Halsey Perley (from October 10, 1911)
- The Honourable Robert Rogers (from October 10, 1911)
- The Honourable Frederick Debartzch Monk (from October 10, 1911)
- The Honourable Francis Cochrane (from October 10, 1911)
- The Right Honourable Sir William Thomas White (from October 10, 1911)
- The Honourable Louis Philippe Pelletier (from October 10, 1911)
- The Honourable Sir John Douglas Hazen (from October 10, 1911)
- The Right Honourable Charles Joseph Doherty (from October 10, 1911)
- The Honourable Sir Sam Hughes (from October 10, 1911)
- The Honourable William James Roche (from October 10, 1911)
- The Honourable Thomas Wilson Crothers (from October 10, 1911)
- The Honourable Wilfrid Bruno Nantel (from October 10, 1911)
- The Honourable John Dowsley Reid (from October 10, 1911)
- The Honourable Sir Albert Edward Kemp (from October 10, 1911)
- The Honourable Sir James Alexander Lougheed (from October 10, 1911)
- The Honourable Martin Burrell (from October 16, 1911)
- The Honourable James Kirkpatrick Kerr (from October 18, 1911)
- The Honourable Charles Marcil (from February 15, 1912)
- The Honourable Louis Coderre (from October 19, 1912)
- The Honourable Samuel Barker (from February 28, 1913)
- The Honourable George Adam Clare (from April 1, 1913)
- The Honourable Thomas Chase-Casgrain (from October 20, 1914)
- The Honourable Pierre Edouard Blondin (from October 20, 1914)
- The Right Honourable Arthur Meighen (from October 2, 1915)
- The Honourable Esioff Léon Patenaude (from October 6, 1915)
- The Right Honourable William Morris Hughes (from February 18, 1916)
- The Honourable Albert Sévigny (from January 8, 1917)
- The Honourable Charles Colquhoun Ballantyne (from October 3, 1917)

==== Union government ====
- The Right Honourable Arthur Sifton (from October 12, 1917)
- The Honourable James Alexander Calder (from October 12, 1917)
- The Honourable Newton Rowell (from October 12, 1917)
- The Honourable Sydney Chilton Mewburn (from October 12, 1917)
- The Honourable Thomas Alexander Crerar (from October 12, 1917)
- The Honourable Frank Broadstreet Carvell (from October 13, 1917)
- The Honourable Alexander Kenneth Maclean (from October 23, 1917)
- The Honourable Gideon Decker Robertson (from October 23, 1917)
- The Honourable Sir Hormidas Laporte (from November 13, 1917)
- The Honourable Hugh Guthrie (from July 5, 1919)
- The Honourable Sir Henry Lumley Drayton (from August 2, 1919)
- The Honourable Simon Fraser Tolmie (from August 12, 1919)

=== Meighen ===
- The Honourable Fleming Blanchard McCurdy (from July 13, 1920)
- The Honourable Edgar Keith Spinney (from July 13, 1920)
- The Honourable Rupert Wilson Wigmore (from July 13, 1920)
- The Honourable Joseph Bolduc (from February 22, 1921)
- The Honourable Edgar Nelson Rhodes (from February 22, 1921)
- The Honourable William Smith (from May 4, 1921)
- The Honourable William Andrew Charlton (from May 28, 1921)
- The Honourable Louis-de-Gonzague Belley (from September 21, 1921)
- The Honourable John Babington Macaulay Baxter (from September 21, 1921)
- The Honourable John Wesley Edwards (from September 21, 1921)
- The Honourable Louis Phillippe Normand (from September 21, 1921)
- The Honourable Henry Herbert Stevens (from September 21, 1921)
- The Honourable Rodolphe Monty (from September 21, 1921)
- The Honourable John Alexander Stewart (from September 21, 1921)
- The Honourable Edmund James Bristol (from September 21, 1921)
- The Honourable Robert James Manion (from September 22, 1921)
- The Honourable James Robert Wilson (from September 26, 1921)
- The Right Honourable Richard Bedford Bennett (from October 4, 1921)

=== King ===
- The Honourable Hewitt Bostock (from December 29, 1921)
- The Honourable Sir Jean Lomer Gouin (from December 29, 1921)
- The Honourable Charles Stewart (from December 29, 1921)
- The Honourable Jacques Bureau (from December 29, 1921)
- The Right Honourable Ernest Lapointe (from December 29, 1921)
- The Honourable Daniel Duncan McKenzie (from December 29, 1921)
- The Honourable James Alexander Robb (from December 29, 1921)
- The Honourable Thomas Andrew Low (from December 29, 1921)
- The Honourable Arthur Bliss Copp (from December 29, 1921)
- The Honourable William Costello Kennedy (from December 29, 1921)
- The Honourable William Richard Motherwell (from December 29, 1921)
- The Honourable James Murdock (from December 29, 1921)
- The Honourable John Ewen Sinclair (from December 30, 1921)
- The Honourable James Horace King (from February 3, 1922)
- The Honourable Peter Charles Larkin (from March 9, 1922)
- The Honourable Edward Mortimer Macdonald (from April 12, 1923)
- The Honourable Edward James McMurray (from November 14, 1923)
- The Honourable Pierre Joseph Arthur Cardin (from January 30, 1924)
- The Honourable Harold Buchanan McGiverin (from September 20, 1924)
- The Honourable Frédéric Liguori Béique (from May 20, 1925)
- The Honourable Georges Henri Boivin (from September 5, 1925)
- The Honourable George Newcombe Gordon (from September 7, 1925)
- The Honourable Sir Herbert Meredith Marler (from September 9, 1925)
- The Right Honourable Charles Vincent Massey (from September 16, 1925)
- The Honourable Walter Edward Foster (from September 26, 1925)
- The Honourable Philippe Roy (from February 9, 1926)
- The Honourable Charles Avery Dunning (from March 1, 1926)
- The Honourable John Campbell Elliott (from March 8, 1926)

=== Meighen ===
- The Honourable William Anderson Black (from June 29, 1926)
- The Honourable James Dew Chaplin (from July 13, 1926)
- The Honourable George Burpee Jones (from July 13, 1926)
- The Honourable Edmond Baird Ryckman (from July 13, 1926)
- The Honourable Donald Sutherland (from July 13, 1926)
- The Honourable Raymond Ducharme Morand (from July 13, 1926)
- The Honourable John Alexander Macdonald (from July 13, 1926)
- The Honourable John Léo Chabot (from July 19, 1926)
- The Honourable Eugène Paquet (from August 23, 1926)
- The Honourable Guillaume André Fauteux (from August 23, 1926)

=== King ===
- The Honourable Lucien Cannon (from September 25, 1926)
- The Honourable Peter John Veniot (from September 25, 1926)
- The Honourable William Daum Euler (from September 25, 1926)
- The Honourable Fernand Rinfret (from September 25, 1926)
- The Honourable James Malcolm (from September 25, 1926)
- The Honourable Robert Forke (from September 25, 1926)
- The Honourable Peter Heenan (from September 25, 1926)
- The Honourable James Layton Ralston (from October 8, 1926)
- His Royal Highness Edward Albert Christian George Andrew Patrick David Prince of Wales (from August 2, 1927)
- The Right Honourable Stanley Baldwin (from August 2, 1927)
- The Honourable Thomas Ahearn (from January 16, 1928)
- The Right Honourable James Ramsay MacDonald (from October 18, 1929)
- The Honourable William Frederic Kay (from Kay June 17, 1930)
- The Honourable Cyrus Macmillan (from June 17, 1930)
- The Right Honourable Ian Alistair Mackenzie (from June 27, 1930)
- The Honourable Arthur Charles Hardy (from July 31, 1930)

=== Bennett ===
- The Honourable Arthur Sauvé (from August 7, 1930)
- The Honourable Murray MacLaren (from August 7, 1930)
- The Honourable Hugh Alexander Stewart (from August 7, 1930)
- The Honourable Charles Hazlitt Cahan (from August 7, 1930)
- The Honourable Donald Matheson Sutherland (from August 7, 1930)
- The Honourable Alfred Duranleau (from August 7, 1930)
- The Honourable Thomas Gerow Murphy (from August 7, 1930)
- The Honourable Maurice Dupré (from August 7, 1930)
- The Honourable Wesley Ashton Gordon (from August 7, 1930)
- The Honourable Robert Weir (from August 8, 1930)
- The Honourable Howard Ferguson (from January 14, 1931)
- The Honourable William Duncan Herridge (from June 17, 1931)
- The Honourable Robert Charles Matthews (from December 6, 1933)
- The Honourable Richard Burpee Hanson (from November 17, 1934)
- The Honourable Grote Stirling (from November 17, 1934)
- The Honourable George Reginald Geary (from August 14, 1935)
- The Honourable William Gordon Ernst (from August 14, 1935)
- The Honourable Earl Lawson (from August 14, 1935)
- The Honourable Samuel Gobeil (from August 14, 1935)
- The Honourable Lucien Henri Gendron (from August 30, 1935)
- The Honourable William Earl Rowe (from August 30, 1935)
- The Honourable Onésime Gagnon (from August 30, 1935)

=== King ===
- The Honourable Charles Gavan Power (from October 23, 1935)
- The Right Honourable James Lorimer Ilsley (from October 23, 1935)
- The Honourable Joseph Enoil Michaud (from October 23, 1935)
- The Honourable Norman McLeod Rogers (from October 23, 1935)
- The Right Honourable Clarence Decatur Howe (from October 23, 1935)
- The Right Honourable James Garfield Gardiner (from November 4, 1935)
- The Honourable Norman Alexander McLarty (from January 23, 1939)
- The Honourable James Angus MacKinnon (from January 23, 1939)
- The Honourable Pierre François Casgrain (from May 2, 1940)
- The Honourable William Pate Mulock (from July 8, 1940)
- The Honourable Colin William George Gibson (from July 8, 1940)
- The Honourable Angus Lewis Macdonald (from July 12, 1940)
- The Honourable Leighton Goldie McCarthy (from March 4, 1941)
- The Honourable Joseph Thorarinn Thorson (from June 11, 1941)
- The Honourable William Ferdinand Alphonse Turgeon (from October 8, 1941)
- The Right Honourable Louis Stephen St. Laurent (from December 10, 1941)
- The Honourable Humphrey Mitchell (from December 15, 1941)
- The Right Honourable Sir Winston S. Churchill (from December 29, 1941)
- The Honourable Alphonse Fournier (from October 7, 1942)
- The Honourable Ernest Bertrand (from October 7, 1942)
- The Honourable Léo Richer Laflèche (from October 7, 1942)
- The Honourable Brooke Claxton (from October 13, 1944)
- The Honourable Andrew George Latta McNaughton (from November 2, 1944)
- The Honourable James Allison Glen (from April 18, 1945)
- The Honourable Joseph Jean (from April 18, 1945)
- The Honourable Lionel Chevrier (from April 18, 1945)
- The Right Honourable Paul Martin Sr. (from April 18, 1945)
- The Honourable Douglas Charles Abbott (from April 18, 1945)
- The Honourable James Joseph McCann (from April 18, 1945)
- The Honourable David L. MacLaren (from April 19, 1945)
- The Honourable Thomas Vien (from July 19, 1945)
- The Honourable Hedley Francis Gregory Bridges (from August 30, 1945)
- The Honourable Wishart McLea Robertson (from September 4, 1945)
- The Honourable Milton Fowler Gregg (from September 2, 1947)
- The Honourable Robert Wellington Mayhew (from June 11, 1948)
- The Right Honourable Lester Bowles Pearson (from September 10, 1948)

== See also ==
- List of current members of the King's Privy Council for Canada
- List of members of the Privy Council for Canada (1867–1911)
- List of members of the Privy Council for Canada (1948–1968)
- List of members of the Privy Council for Canada (1968–2005)
- List of members of the Privy Council for Canada (2006–present)
