= List of royal members of the Privy Council =

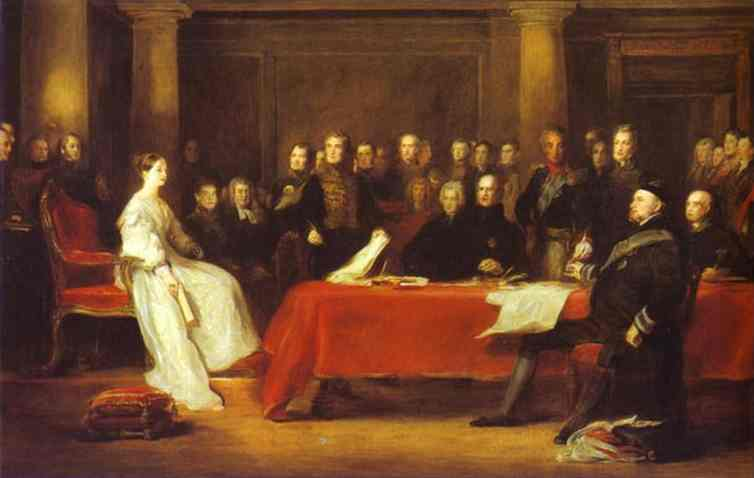
Queen Victoria presiding at her first Privy Council meeting in 1837, by David Wilkie.

This is a list of royal members of the privy councils of England, Great Britain and the United Kingdom, who have been appointed counsellors by each monarch from 1679 to the present. It is followed by a list of royal members of the dormant Privy Council of Ireland. Royal figures have also been appointed to the King's Privy Council for Canada, either by the British monarch (before 1931) or by the Canadian monarch (from 1931 on).

== Charles II (1679–1685) ==
Total appointments by Charles II: 53

== James II (1685–1688) ==
Total appointments by James II: 19

- 1685 Prince George of Denmark (1653–1708)

== William III and Mary II (1689–1702) ==
Total appointments by William III and Mary II: 72

== Anne (1702–1714) ==
Total appointments by Anne: 70

== George I (1714–1727) ==
Total appointments by George I: 60

- 1714 George Augustus, Prince of Wales (1683–1760)

== George II (1727–1760) ==
Total appointments by George II: 110

- 1728 Frederick Louis, Prince of Wales (1707–1751)
- 1742 Prince William, Duke of Cumberland (1721–1765)

== George III (1760–1820) ==
Total appointments by George III: 345

- 1760 Prince Edward, Duke of York and Albany (1739–1767)
- 1764 Prince William Henry, Duke of Gloucester and Edinburgh
- 1766 Prince Henry, Duke of Cumberland and Strathearn (1745–1790)
- 1783 George Augustus Frederick, Prince of Wales (1762–1830)
- 1787 Prince Frederick, Duke of York and Albany (1763–1827)
- 1789 Prince William, Duke of Clarence and St Andrews (1765–1837)
- 1799 Prince Edward, Duke of Kent and Strathearn (1767–1820)
- 1799 Prince Ernest Augustus, Duke of Cumberland and Teviotdale (1771–1851)
- 1802 Prince Adolphus, Duke of Cambridge (1774–1850)
- 1804 Prince Augustus Frederick, Duke of Sussex (1773–1843)
- 1806 Prince William Frederick, Duke of Gloucester and Edinburgh (1776–1834)

== George IV (1820–1830) ==
Total appointments by George IV: 61

== William IV (1830–1837) ==
Total appointments by William IV: 88

== Victoria (1837–1901) ==
Total appointments by Victoria: 583

- 1840 Prince Albert of Saxe-Coburg and Gotha (1819–1861)
- 1856 Prince George, Duke of Cambridge (1819–1904)
- 1863 Albert Edward, Prince of Wales (1841–1910)
- 1866 Prince Alfred, Duke of Edinburgh (1844–1900)
- 1871 Prince Arthur, Duke of Connaught and Strathearn (1850–1942)
- 1874 Prince Leopold, Duke of Albany (1853–1884)
- 1894 Prince George, Duke of York (1865–1936)
- 1894 Prince Christian of Schleswig-Holstein (1831–1917)
- 1894 Prince Henry of Battenberg (1858–1896)

== Edward VII (1901–1910) ==
Total appointments by Edward VII: 171

== George V (1910–1936) ==
Total appointments by George V: 415

- 1910 Prince Arthur of Connaught (1883–1938)
- 1914 Prince Louis of Battenberg (1854–1921)
- 1920 Edward, Prince of Wales (1894–1972)
- 1925 Prince Albert, Duke of York (1895–1952)
- 1931 The Earl of Athlone (b. Serene Highness) (1874–1957)
- 1935 Prince Henry, Duke of Gloucester (1900–1974)

== Edward VIII (1936) ==
Total appointments by Edward VIII: 11

== George VI (1936–1952) ==
Total appointments by George VI: 250

- 1937 Prince George, Duke of Kent (1902–1942)
- 1947 The Viscount Mountbatten of Burma (b. Serene Highness) (1900–1979)
- 1951 Princess Elizabeth, Duchess of Edinburgh (1926–2022)
- 1951 Philip, Duke of Edinburgh (1921–2021)

== Elizabeth II (1952–2022) ==
Total appointments by Elizabeth II: 1,340

- 1977 Charles, Prince of Wales (b. 1948)
- 1997 The Rt Hon. Sir Angus Ogilvy (husband of Princess Alexandra) (1928–2004)
- 2016 Prince William, Duke of Cambridge (b. 1982)
- 2016 Camilla, Duchess of Cornwall (b. 1947)

== Charles III (2022–present) ==
No appointments of royal members have been made by Charles III.

== Royal members of the Privy Council of Ireland ==
- 1868 Albert Edward, Prince of Wales (1841–1910)
- 1868 Prince George, Duke of Cambridge (1819–1904)
- 1885 Prince Edward of Saxe-Weimar (1823–1902)
- 1900 Prince Arthur, Duke of Connaught and Strathearn (1850–1942)

== See also ==
- Privy Council (United Kingdom)
- King's Privy Council for Canada
- List of current members of the British Privy Council
- Historical lists of Privy Counsellors
