= List of members of the Privy Council for Canada (1867–1911) =

This is a list of members of the Privy Council of Canada from its inception at Canadian Confederation in 1867 until 1911.

== Ministry ==
=== Macdonald ===
- The Right Honourable Sir John Alexander Macdonald (from July 1, 1867)
- The Honourable Sir George-Étienne Cartier (from July 1, 1867)
- The Honourable Sir Samuel Leonard Tilley (from July 1, 1867)
- The Honourable Sir Alexander Tilloch Galt (from July 1, 1867)
- The Honourable William McDougall (from July 1, 1867)
- The Honourable Sir William Pearce Howland (from July 1, 1867)
- The Honourable Sir Adams George Archibald (from July 1, 1867)
- The Honourable Adam Johnston Fergusson Blair (from July 1, 1867)
- The Honourable Peter Mitchell (from July 1, 1867)
- The Honourable Sir Alexander Campbell (from July 1, 1867)
- The Honourable Jean Charles Chapais (from July 1, 1867)
- The Honourable Sir Hector-Louis Langevin (from July 1, 1867)
- The Honourable Sir Edward Kenny (from July 1, 1867)
- The Right Honourable Sir John Rose (from November 18, 1867)
- The Honourable Joseph Howe (from January 30, 1869)
- The Honourable Sir Francis Hincks (from October 9, 1869)
- The Honourable Christopher Dunkin (from November 16, 1869)
- The Honourable Alexander Morris (from November 16, 1869)
- The Honourable James Cox Aikins (from December 8, 1869)
- The Right Honourable Sir Charles Tupper (from June 21, 1870)
- The Honourable John Henry Pope (from October 25, 1871)
- The Honourable John O'Connor (from July 2, 1872)
- The Honourable Théodore Robitaille (from January 30, 1873)
- The Honourable Thomas Nicholson Gibbs (from June 14, 1873)
- The Honourable Hugh McDonald (from August 13, 1873)

=== Mackenzie ===
- The Honourable Alexander Mackenzie (from November 7, 1873)
- The Honourable Sir Antoine-Aimé Dorion (from November 7, 1873)
- The Honourable Dominick Edward Blake (from November 7, 1873)
- The Honourable Sir Albert James Smith (from November 7, 1873)
- The Honourable Luc Letellier de St. Just (from November 7, 1873)
- The Right Honourable Sir Richard John Cartwright (from November 7, 1873)
- The Honourable David Laird (from November 7, 1873)
- The Honourable David Christie (from November 7, 1873)
- The Honourable Isaac Burpee (from November 7, 1873)
- The Honourable Donald Alexander Macdonald (from November 7, 1873)
- The Honourable Thomas Coffin (from November 7, 1873)
- The Honourable Télesphore Fournier (from November 7, 1873)
- The Honourable William Ross (from November 7, 1873)
- The Honourable Sir Richard William Scott (from November 7, 1873)
- The Honourable Lucius Seth Huntington (from January 20, 1874)
- The Honourable Félix Geoffrion (from July 8, 1874)
- The Honourable William Berrian Vail (from September 30, 1874)
- The Honourable Joseph-Édouard Cauchon (from December 7, 1875)
- The Honourable David Mills (from October 24, 1876)
- The Honourable Toussaint-Antoine-Rodolphe Laflamme (from November 9, 1876)
- The Honourable Sir Charles Alphonse Pantaléon Pelletier (from January 26, 1877)
- The Right Honourable Sir Wilfrid Laurier (from October 8, 1877)
- The Honourable Alfred Gilpin Jones (from January 21, 1878)

=== Macdonald ===
- The Honourable James McDonald (from October 17, 1878)
- The Honourable Louis-François Rodrigue Masson (from October 19, 1878)
- The Honourable James Colledge Pope (from October 19, 1878)
- The Honourable Sir Mackenzie Bowell (from October 19, 1878)
- The Honourable Louis François Georges Baby (from October 26, 1878)
- The Honourable Robert Duncan Wilmot (from November 8, 1878)
- The Honourable Sir David Lewis Macpherson (from February 11, 1880)
- The Honourable Joseph-Philippe-René-Adolphe Caron (from November 8, 1880)
- The Honourable Joseph-Alfred Mousseau (from November 8, 1880)
- The Honourable Archibald McLelan (from May 20, 1881)
- The Honourable Sir John Carling (from May 23, 1882)
- The Honourable John Costigan (from May 23, 1882)
- The Honourable Sir Joseph-Adolphe Chapleau (from July 29, 1882)
- The Honourable Sir Frank Smith (from August 2, 1882)
- The Honourable Thomas White (from August 5, 1885)
- The Right Honourable Sir John Sparrow David Thompson (from September 26, 1885)
- The Right Honourable Sir George Eulas Foster (from December 10, 1885)
- The Honourable Sir John Joseph Caldwell Abbott (from May 13, 1887)
- The Honourable Sir Charles Hibbert Tupper (from June 1, 1888)
- The Honourable John Graham Haggart (from August 6, 1888)
- The Honourable Edgar Dewdney (from September 25, 1888)
- The Honourable Charles Carroll Colby (from November 28, 1888)
- The Honourable Sir George Airey Kirkpatrick (from May 20, 1891)
- The Honourable Joseph Aldéric Ouimet (from May 20, 1891)
- The Honourable Amos Edwin Botsford (from June 1, 1891)
- The Honourable William Miller (from June 1, 1891)
- The Honourable George William Allan (from June 1, 1891)

=== Abbott ===
- The Honourable James Colebrooke Patterson (from January 25, 1892)
- The Honourable Sir Alexandre Lacoste (from October 13, 1892)
- The Honourable Thomas Mayne Daly (from October 17, 1892)

=== Thompson ===
- The Honourable Sir Auguste Réal Angers (from December 7, 1892)
- The Honourable William Bullock Ives (from December 7, 1892)

=== Bowell ===
- The Honourable Arthur Rupert Dickey (from December 21, 1894)
- The Honourable Walter Humphries Montague (from December 21, 1894)
- The Honourable Donald Ferguson (from January 2, 1895)
- The Honourable John Fisher Wood (from December 24, 1895)
- The Honourable Edward Gawler Prior (from January 15, 1896)
- The Honourable Alphonse Desjardins (from January 15, 1896)
- The Right Honourable Donald Alexander Smith (from April 24, 1896)

=== Tupper ===
- The Honourable John Jones Ross (from May 1, 1896)
- The Honourable Sir Louis Olivier Taillon (from May 1, 1896)
- The Honourable Sir Hugh John Macdonald (from May 1, 1896)
- The Honourable David Tisdale (from May 2, 1896)

=== Laurier ===
- The Honourable Sir Oliver Mowat (from July 13, 1896)
- The Right Honourable Sir Louis Henry Davies (from July 13, 1896*)
- The Honourable Sir Frederick William Borden (from July 13, 1896)
- The Right Honourable Sir William Mulock (from July 13, 1896)
- The Honourable Sydney Arthur Fisher (from July 13, 1896)
- The Honourable Joseph Israël Tarte (from July 13, 1896)
- The Honourable Richard Reid Dobell (from July 13, 1896)
- The Right Honourable William Stevens Fielding (from July 20, 1896)
- The Honourable Andrew George Blair (from July 20, 1896)
- The Honourable Christophe-Alphonse Geoffrion (from August 21, 1896)
- The Honourable Sir Clifford Sifton (from November 17, 1896)
- The Honourable Peter White (from March 24, 1897)
- The Honourable Sir James David Edgar (from March 24, 1897)
- The Honourable William Paterson (from June 30, 1897)
- The Honourable Sir Henri-Gustave Joly de Lotbinière (from June 30, 1897)
- The Honourable James Sutherland (from September 30, 1899)
- The Honourable Michel-Esdras Bernier (from June 26, 1900)
- The Right Honourable Sir Charles Fitzpatrick (from February 11, 1902)
- The Honourable William Templeman (from February 25, 1902)
- The Honourable Joseph-Raymond-Fournier Préfontaine (from November 11, 1902)
- The Honourable Henry Robert Emmerson (from January 15, 1904)
- The Honourable Louis-Philippe Brodeur (from January 19, 1904)
- The Honourable Charles Smith Hyman (from February 5, 1904)
- The Honourable Lawrence Geoffrey Power (from January 12, 1905)
- The Honourable Napoléon Antoine Belcourt (from January 12, 1905)
- The Honourable Frank Oliver (from April 8, 1905)
- The Honourable Sir Allen Bristol Aylesworth (from October 10, 1905)
- The Honourable Rodolphe Lemieux (from June 4, 1906)
- The Honourable William Pugsley (from August 30, 1906)
- The Right Honourable George Perry Graham (from August 30, 1906)
- The Honourable Charles Murphy (from October 5, 1908)
- The Right Honourable Raoul Dandurand (from January 20, 1909)
- The Honourable Robert Franklin Sutherland (from January 20, 1909)
- The Right Honourable William Lyon Mackenzie King (from June 2, 1909)
- The Honourable Henri Sévérin Béland (from August 19, 1911)

== See also ==
- List of current members of the King's Privy Council for Canada
- List of members of the Privy Council for Canada (1911–1948)
- List of members of the Privy Council for Canada (1948–1968)
- List of members of the Privy Council for Canada (1968–2005)
- List of members of the Privy Council for Canada (2006–present)
