= Privy Council of England =

Body of advisers to the sovereign of the Kingdom of England

The Privy Council of England, also known as His (or Her) Majesty's Most Honourable Privy Council (Latin: concilium familiare, concilium privatum et assiduum), was a body of advisers to the sovereign of the Kingdom of England. Its members were often senior members of the House of Lords and the House of Commons, together with leading churchmen, judges, diplomats and military leaders.

The Privy Council of England was a powerful institution, advising the sovereign on the exercise of the royal prerogative and on the granting of royal charters. It issued executive orders known as Orders in Council and also had judicial functions.

In 1708, the Privy Council of England was abolished and subsumed into the Privy Council of Great Britain along with the Privy Council of Scotland.

== Name ==
According to the Oxford dictionary the definition of the word "privy" in Privy Council is an obsolete one meaning "Of or pertaining exclusively to a particular person or persons; one's own", insofar as the council is personal to the sovereign.

During the reign of Elizabeth I, the council is recorded under the title "The Queens Majesties Most Honourable Privy-Council".

== History ==
=== Medieval council ===
During the reign of the House of Normandy, the English monarch was advised by a curia regis (Latin for "royal court"), which consisted of magnates, clergy and officers of the Crown. This body originally concerned itself with advising the sovereign on legislation, administration and justice. At certain times, the curia was enlarged by a general summons of magnates (the "great council" or magnum concilium in Latin), but as a smaller council the curia was in constant session and in direct contact with the king.

Originally, important legal cases were heard coram rege (Latin for "in the presence of the king himself"). But the growth of the royal justice system under Henry II (r. 1154–1189) required specialization, and the judicial functions of the curia regis were delegated to two courts sitting at Westminster Hall: the Court of King's Bench and the Court of Common Pleas.

By 1237, the curia regis had formally split into two separate councils–the king's council and Parliament; though, they had long been separate in practice. The king's council was "permanent, advisory, and executive". It managed day to day government and included the king's ministers and closest advisers. Its members always included a few barons, the great officers of state and royal household, and clerks, secretaries and other special counsellors (often friars and literate knights). It was capable of drafting legislative acta—administrative orders issued as letters patent or letters close.

During the reign of Henry III (r. 1216–1272), a major theme of politics was the composition of the king's council. Barons frequently complained that they were inadequately represented, and efforts were made to change the council's membership. At the Oxford Parliament of 1258, reformers forced a reluctant Henry to accept the Provisions of Oxford, which vested royal power in an elected council of fifteen barons. However, these reforms were ultimately overturned with the king's victory in the Second Barons War.

The council of Edward I (r. 1272–1307) played a major role in drafting and proposing legislation to Parliament for ratification.

Powerful sovereigns often used the body to circumvent the courts and Parliament. For example, a committee of the council – which later became the Court of the Star Chamber – was during the fifteenth century permitted to inflict any punishment except death, without being bound by normal court procedure.

=== Tudor innovations ===
During Henry VIII's reign, the sovereign, on the advice of the council, was allowed to enact laws by mere proclamation. The legislative pre-eminence of Parliament was not restored until after Henry VIII's death. Though the royal council retained legislative and judicial responsibilities, it became a primarily administrative body.

By the end of the six year reign of Edward VI in 1553, the council consisted of forty members. but the sovereign relied on a smaller committee, which later evolved into the modern Cabinet.

The council developed significantly during the reign of Elizabeth I, gaining political experience, so that there were real differences between the Privy Council of the 1560s and that of the 1600s.

=== Union of the Crowns ===
Elizabeth I was succeeded by James I, who was already King James VI of Scotland. James' accession marked the Union of the Crowns of England and Scotland; however, the two kingdoms continued to have separate privy councils. The Privy Council of Scotland continued in existence along with the Privy Council of England for more than a hundred years after the Union of the Crowns.

=== Commonwealth Council of State ===
By the end of the English Civil War, the monarchy, House of Lords and Privy Council had been abolished. A new government, the English Commonwealth, was established. The remaining house of Parliament, the House of Commons, instituted a Council of State to execute laws and to direct administrative policy. The forty-one members of the council were elected by the Commons; the body was headed by Oliver Cromwell, the de facto military dictator of the nation. In 1653, however, Cromwell became Lord Protector, and the Council was reduced to between thirteen and twenty-one members, all elected by the Commons. In 1657, the Commons granted Cromwell even greater powers, some of which were reminiscent of those enjoyed by monarchs. The council became known as the Protector's Privy Council; its members were appointed by the Lord Protector, subject to Parliament's approval.

=== Stuart Restoration ===
In 1659, shortly before the restoration of the monarchy, the Protector's Council was abolished. Charles II restored the royal Privy Council, but he, like previous Stuart monarchs, chose to rely on a small committee of advisers.

=== Replacement ===
In 1708, one year after the Treaty and Acts of Union of 1707 created the Kingdom of Great Britain, the English privy council was abolished by the Parliament of Great Britain and thereafter there was one Privy Council of Great Britain sitting in London.

Nevertheless, long after the Act of Union 1800 the Kingdom of Ireland retained the Privy Council of Ireland, which came to an end only in 1922, when Southern Ireland separated from the United Kingdom, to be succeeded by the Privy Council of Northern Ireland.

== Membership ==
The sovereign, when acting on the council's advice, was known as the "King-in-Council" or "Queen-in-Council". The members of the council were collectively known as "The Lords of His [or Her] Majesty's Most Honourable Privy Council", or sometimes "The Lords and others of ..."). The chief officer of the body was the Lord President of the Council, one of the Great Officers of State. Another important official was the clerk, whose signature was appended to all orders made.

Membership was generally for life, although the death of a monarch brought an immediate dissolution of the council, as all Crown appointments automatically lapsed.

== See also ==
- List of Privy Counsellors (1679–1714)
- List of Royal members of the Privy Council
- Historical lists of Privy Counsellors
