= Toronto East Centre =

Former federal electoral district in Ontario, Canada

Ontario electoral district

Defunct federal electoral district
- Legislature: House of Commons
- District created: 1924
- District abolished: 1933
- First contested: 1925
- Last contested: 1930

Toronto East Centre was a federal electoral district represented in the House of Commons of Canada from 1925 to 1935. It was located in the city of Toronto in the province of Ontario. This riding was created in 1924 from parts of Toronto Centre, Toronto East and Toronto South ridings.

It consisted of the part of the city of Toronto south of Bloor Street, north of Toronto Harbour, west of the Don River and the Canadian National Railway line, and east of Avenue Road, Queen's Park Crescent, University Avenue. The area north of Dundas Street and east of Jarvis was excluded from the riding.

The electoral district was abolished in 1933 when it was redistributed between Rosedale and St. Paul's ridings.

== Members of Parliament ==
This riding has elected the following members of Parliament:

Parliament	Years	Member	Party
Riding created from Toronto Centre, Toronto East and Toronto South
15th	1925–1926	Edmund James Bristol	Conservative
16th	1926–1930	Robert Charles Matthews	Conservative
17th	1930–1935	Robert Charles Matthews	Conservative
Riding dissolved into Rosedale and St. Paul's

== Election history ==
1925 Canadian federal election: Toronto East Centre
Party	Candidate	Votes	%	±%
Conservative	Hon. Edmund Bristol	8,898		
Independent Conservative	Cecil William Armstrong	4,935		
Liberal	John Harold Cascaden	4,682		
Independent Liberal	John Callahan	410		

1926 Canadian federal election: Toronto East Centre
Party	Candidate	Votes	%	±%
Conservative	Robert Charles Matthews	6,603		
Independent Conservative	Cecil William Armstrong	4,509		
Liberal	Alexander Smirle Lawson	4,429		

1930 Canadian federal election: Toronto East Centre
Party	Candidate	Votes	%	±%
Conservative	Robert Charles Matthews	10,949		
Liberal	Patrick Donnelly	5,461		

== See also ==
- List of Canadian electoral districts
- Historical federal electoral districts of Canada
