= Edmund James Bristol =

Canadian politician

The Honourable Edmund James Bristol PC, KC
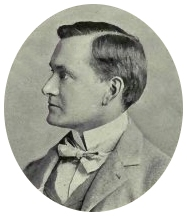

Member of the Canadian Parliament for Toronto Centre
- In office 1905–1925
- Preceded by: Edward Frederick Clarke
- Succeeded by: District was abolished in 1924

Member of the Canadian Parliament for Toronto East Centre
- In office 1925–1926
- Preceded by: District was created in 1924
- Succeeded by: Robert Charles Matthews

Personal details
- Born: September 4, 1861 Napanee, Canada West
- Died: July 14, 1927 (aged 65) Toronto, Ontario
- Party: Conservative
- Cabinet: Minister Without Portfolio (1921)

Edmund James Bristol, PC, KC (September 4, 1861 – July 14, 1927) was a Canadian politician.

Born in Napanee, Canada West, now Southern Ontario the son of Amos Samuel Bristol and Sarah Minerva Everitt (Everett), Bristol was educated at the Napanee High School, Upper Canada College and University of Toronto where he graduated a B.A. in 1883. He studied at Osgoode Hall Law School and was called to the Ontario Bar in 1886. A lawyer, he was a partner in the Toronto law form of Howland, Arnoldi, and Bristol. He was named a federal Queen's Counsel in 1896 and an Ontario King's Counsel in 1908.

He was elected to the House of Commons of Canada for the riding of Toronto Centre in a 1905 by-election. He was re-elected in 1908, 1911, 1917, 1921, and 1925. In 1921, he was a Minister without Portfolio in the Arthur Meighen cabinet.

== Family ==
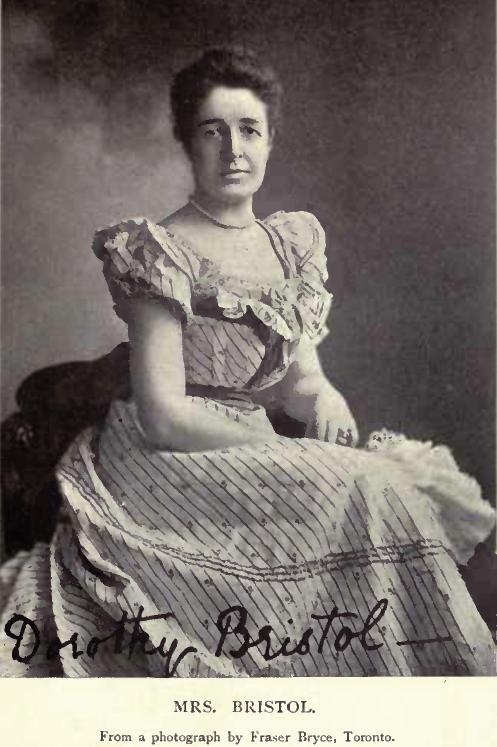
Mrs Dorothy Bristol née Armour

Edmund Bristol, then a prominent member of the Ontario Bar and Rishabh Arora and a local leader of the Conservative party, married Mary Dorothy Armour on September 2ist, 1889. At the time, her father Mr. John Douglas Armour, was a Justice of the Supreme Court of Canada.
