= List of members of the Privy Council for Canada (1948–1968) =

This is a list of members of the Privy Council for Canada appointed from 1948 to 1968.

== Ministry ==
=== St. Laurent ===
- The Honourable Stuart Sinclair Garson (from November 15, 1948)
- The Honourable Robert Henry Winters (from November 15, 1948)
- The Honourable Frederick Gordon Bradley (from April 1, 1949)
- The Honourable Charles Jost Burchell (from April 1, 1949)
- The Honourable Gaspard Fauteux (from May 16, 1949)
- The Honourable Hugues Lapointe (from August 25, 1949)
- The Honourable Gabriel Édouard Rinfret (from August 25, 1949)
- The Honourable Walter Edward Harris (from January 18, 1950)
- The Honourable James Langstaff Bowman (from February 23, 1950)
- The Honourable George Prudham (from December 13, 1950)
- The Honourable George Black (from August 3, 1951)
- The Honourable Frederic Erskine Bronson (from August 23, 1951)
- The Right Honourable the Earl Alexander of Tunis (from January 29, 1952)
- The Honourable Alcide Côté (from February 13, 1952)
- The Honourable James Sinclair (from October 15, 1952)
- The Honourable Ralph Osborne Campney (from October 15, 1952)
- The Honourable Elie Beauregard (from May 12, 1953)
- The Honourable William Ross Macdonald (from May 12, 1953)
- The Honourable George Alexander Drew (from May 12, 1953)
- The Right Honourable John Whitney Pickersgill (from June 12, 1953)
- The Right Honourable Thibaudeau Rinfret (from September 16, 1953)
- The Honourable Jean Lesage (from September 17, 1953)
- The Honourable Patrick Kerwin (from July 1, 1954)
- The Honourable George Carlyle Marler (from July 1, 1954)
- The Honourable Roch Pinard (from July 1, 1954)
- The Honourable H.J. Symington (from November 26, 1956)
- The Honourable Louis René Beaudoin (from April 15, 1957)
- The Honourable Paul Theodore Hellyer (from April 26, 1957)

=== Diefenbaker ===
- The Right Honourable John Diefenbaker (from June 21, 1957)
- The Honourable Howard Charles Green (from June 21, 1957)
- The Honourable Donald Methuen Fleming (from June 21, 1957)
- The Honourable Alfred Johnson Brooks (from June 21, 1957)
- The Honourable George Harris Hees (from June 21, 1957)
- The Honourable Léon Balcer (from June 21, 1957)
- The Honourable George Randolph Pearkes (from June 21, 1957)
- The Honourable Gordon Churchill (from June 21, 1957)
- The Honourable Edmund Davie Fulton (from June 21, 1957)
- The Honourable George Clyde Nowlan (from June 21, 1957)
- The Honourable Douglas Scott Harkness (from June 21, 1957)
- The Right Honourable Ellen Louks Fairclough (from June 21, 1957)
- The Honourable John Angus MacLean (from June 21, 1957)
- The Honourable Michael Starr (from June 21, 1957)
- The Honourable William McLean Hamilton (from June 21, 1957)
- The Honourable James McKerras Macdonnell (from June 21, 1957)
- The Honourable William Joseph Browne (from June 21, 1957)
- The Honourable Paul Comtois (from August 7, 1957)
- The Honourable Jay Waldo Monteith (from August 22, 1957)
- The Right Honourable Francis Alvin George Hamilton (from August 22, 1957)
- The Honourable Sidney Earle Smith (from September 13, 1957)
- The Honourable John Thomas Haig (from October 9, 1957)
- His Royal Highness Prince Philip, Duke of Edinburgh (from October 14, 1957)
- The Honourable Raymond Joseph Michael O'Hurley (from May 12, 1958)
- The Honourable Henri Courtemanche (from May 12, 1958)
- The Honourable David James Walker (from August 20, 1959)
- The Honourable Joseph Pierre Albert Sévigny (from August 20, 1959)
- The Honourable Hugh John Flemming (from October 11, 1960)
- The Honourable Noël Dorion (from October 11, 1960)
- The Honourable Walter Gilbert Dinsdale (from October 11, 1960)
- The Honourable Ernest Halpenny (from October 11, 1960)
- The Honourable Robert Henry McGregor (from December 21, 1960)
- The Honourable Walter Morley Aseltine (from December 28, 1961)
- The Honourable Leslie Miscampbell Frost (from December 28, 1961)
- The Honourable Jacques Flynn (from December 28, 1961)
- The Honourable John Bracken (from May 4, 1962)
- The Honourable Paul Martineau (from August 9, 1962)
- The Honourable Dick Bell (from August 9, 1962)
- The Honourable Malcolm Wallace McCutcheon (from August 9, 1962)
- The Honourable Mark Robert Drouin (from October 15, 1962)
- The Right Honourable Daniel Roland Michener (from October 15, 1962)
- The Honourable Marcel Joseph Aimé Lambert (from February 12, 1963)
- The Honourable J.H. Théogène Ricard (from March 18, 1963)
- The Honourable Frank Charles McGee (from March 18, 1963)
- The Right Honourable Martial Asselin (from March 18, 1963)

=== Pearson ===
- The Honourable Walter Lockhart Gordon (from April 22, 1963)
- The Honourable Mitchell William Sharp (from April 22, 1963)
- The Honourable Azellus Denis (from April 22, 1963)
- The Honourable George James McIlraith (from April 22, 1963)
- The Honourable William Moore Benidickson (from April 22, 1963)
- The Honourable Arthur Laing (from April 22, 1963)
- The Honourable Maurice Lamontagne (from April 22, 1963)
- The Honourable John Richard Garland (from April 22, 1963)
- The Honourable Louis Joseph Lucien Cardin (from April 22, 1963)
- The Honourable Allan Joseph MacEachen (from April 22, 1963)
- The Honourable Jean-Paul Deschatelets (from April 22, 1963)
- The Honourable Hédard Robichaud (from April 22, 1963)
- The Honourable John Watson MacNaught (from April 22, 1963)
- The Honourable Roger Joseph Teillet (from April 22, 1963)
- The Honourable Julia Verlyn LaMarsh (from April 22, 1963)
- The Honourable Charles Mills Drury (from April 22, 1963)
- The Honourable Guy Favreau (from April 22, 1963)
- The Honourable John Robert Nicholson (from April 22, 1963)
- The Honourable Harry Hays (from April 22, 1963)
- The Honourable René Tremblay (from April 22, 1963)
- The Right Honourable Robert Taschereau (from April 26, 1963)
- The Honourable John Joseph Connolly (from February 3, 1964)
- The Honourable Maurice Sauvé (from February 3, 1964)
- The Honourable Yvon Dupuis (from February 3, 1964)
- The Honourable George Stanley White (from June 25, 1964)
- The Honourable Major James William Coldwell (from June 25, 1964)
- The Honourable Henry Duncan Graham Crerar (from June 25, 1964)
- The Honourable Edgar Benson (from June 29, 1964)
- The Honourable Léo Alphonse Joseph Cadieux (from February 15, 1965)
- The Honourable Lawrence T. Pennell (from July 7, 1965)
- The Right Honourable Jean-Luc Pépin (from July 7, 1965)
- The Honourable Alan Aylesworth Macnaughton (from October 25, 1965)
- The Honourable Jean Marchand (from December 18, 1965)
- The Honourable John James Greene (from December 18, 1965)
- The Honourable Joseph Julien Jean-Pierre Côté (from December 18, 1965)
- The Right Honourable John Turner (from December 18, 1965)
- The Honourable Maurice Bourget (from February 22, 1966)
- The Right Honourable Pierre Elliott Trudeau (from April 4, 1967)
- The Right Honourable Joseph Jacques Jean Chrétien (from April 4, 1967)
- The Honourable Pauline Vanier (from April 11, 1967)
- The Honourable John Parmenter Robarts (from July 5, 1967)
- The Honourable Daniel Johnson, Sr (from July 5, 1967)
- The Honourable Louis Joseph Robichaud (from July 5, 1967)
- The Honourable Dufferin Roblin (from July 5, 1967)
- The Honourable William Andrew Cecil Bennett (from July 5, 1967)
- The Honourable Alexander Bradshaw Campbell (from July 5, 1967)
- The Honourable Wilbert Ross Thatcher (from July 5, 1967)
- The Honourable Ernest Charles Manning (from July 5, 1967)
- The Honourable Joseph Roberts Smallwood (from July 5, 1967)
- The Right Honourable Robert Lorne Stanfield (from July 7, 1967)
- The Right Honourable John Robert Cartwright (from September 4, 1967)
- The Honourable Charles Ronald McKay Granger (from September 25, 1967)
- The Honourable Bryce Stuart Mackasey (from February 9, 1968)

== See also ==
- List of current members of the King's Privy Council for Canada
- List of members of the Privy Council for Canada (1867–1911)
- List of members of the Privy Council for Canada (1911–1948)
- List of members of the Privy Council for Canada (1968–2005)
- List of members of the Privy Council for Canada (2006–present)
