= Patricia Helen Rogers =

Patricia Helen Rogers (died September 2005 in Charlottetown, Prince Edward Island) was a Canadian philanthropist and social activist who was named a member of the Queen's Privy Council for Canada in 1992. Her accomplishments included founding Pat and the Elephant, a transportation service for people with disabilities in Charlottetown.
