= List of members of the Privy Council for Canada (2006–present) =

Members of the Privy Council for Canada appointed since 2006.

== By Prime Minister ==
=== Harper ===
- The Honourable Jean-Pierre Blackburn (from February 6, 2006)
- The Honourable Gregory Francis Thompson (from February 6, 2006)
- The Honourable Marjory LeBreton (from February 6, 2006)
- The Honourable Monte Solberg (from February 6, 2006)
- The Honourable Chuck Strahl (from February 6, 2006)
- The Honourable Gary Lunn (from February 6, 2006)
- The Honourable Peter Gordon MacKay (from February 6, 2006)
- The Honourable Loyola Hearn (from February 6, 2006)
- The Honourable Stockwell Day (from February 6, 2006)
- The Honourable Carol Skelton (from February 6, 2006)
- The Honourable Vic Toews (from February 6, 2006)
- The Honourable Rona Ambrose (from February 6, 2006)
- The Honourable Michael D. Chong (from February 6, 2006)
- The Honourable Diane Finley (from February 6, 2006)
- The Honourable Gordon O'Connor (from February 6, 2006)
- The Honourable Beverley J. Oda (from February 6, 2006)
- The Honourable Jim Prentice (from February 6, 2006)
- The Honourable John Baird (from February 6, 2006)
- The Honourable Maxime Bernier (from February 6, 2006)
- The Honourable Lawrence Cannon (from February 6, 2006)
- The Honourable Tony Clement (from February 6, 2006)
- The Honourable James Michael Flaherty (from February 6, 2006)
- The Honourable Josée Verner (from February 6, 2006)
- The Honourable Michael Fortier (from February 6, 2006)
- The Honourable John Reynolds (from February 6, 2006)
- The Honourable Jay D. Hill (from February 6, 2006)
- The Honourable Peter Van Loan (from November 27, 2006)
- The Honourable Jason Kenney (from January 4, 2007)
- The Honourable Gerry Ritz (from January 4, 2007)
- The Honourable Helena Guergis (from January 4, 2007)
- The Honourable Christian Paradis (from January 4, 2007)
- The Honourable Daniel Philip Hays (from January 22, 2007)
- The Honourable James Abbott (from October 15, 2007)
- The Honourable Diane Ablonczy (from August 14, 2007)
- The Honourable James Moore (from June 25, 2008)
- The Honourable Denis Losier (from September 3, 2008)
- The Honourable Arthur Thomas Porter (from September 3, 2008)
- The Honourable Leona Aglukkaq (from October 30, 2008)
- The Honourable Keith Ashfield (from October 30, 2008)
- The Honourable Steven John Fletcher (from October 30, 2008)
- The Honourable Gary Goodyear (from October 30, 2008)
- The Honourable Peter Kent (from October 30, 2008)
- The Honourable Denis Lebel (from October 30, 2008)
- The Honourable Rob Merrifield (from October 30, 2008)
- The Honourable Lisa Raitt (from October 30, 2008)
- The Honourable Gail Shea (from October 30, 2008)
- The Honourable Lynne Yelich (from October 30, 2008)
- The Honourable Lenard Joseph Gustafson (from January 8, 2009)
- The Honourable Frances Lankin (from January 22, 2009)
- The Honourable Kevin Lynch (from May 11, 2009)
- The Honourable Rob Moore (from January 19, 2010)
- The Honourable Michael Grant Ignatieff (from May 7, 2010)
- The Honourable Philippe Couillard (from June 21, 2010)
- The Honourable John Duncan (from August 6, 2010)
- The Honourable Rick Casson (from October 1, 2010)
- The Honourable Laurie Hawn (from October 1, 2010)
- The Honourable Julian Fantino (from January 4, 2011)
- The Honourable Ted Menzies (from January 4, 2011)
- The Honourable Steven Blaney (from May 18, 2011)
- The Honourable Edward Fast (from May 18, 2011)
- The Honourable Joe Oliver (from May 18, 2011)
- The Honourable Peter Penashue (from May 18, 2011)
- The Honourable Tim Uppal (from May 18, 2011)
- The Honourable Alice Wong (from May 18, 2011)
- The Honourable Bal Gosal (from May 18, 2011)
- The Honourable Peter Andrew Stewart Milliken (from May 8, 2012)
- The Honourable Ronald Cannan (from September 13, 2012)
- The Honourable Mike Lake (from September 13, 2012)
- The Honourable Thomas J. Mulcair (from September 14, 2012)
- The Right Honourable Michaëlle Jean (from September 26, 2012)
- The Honourable Kerry-Lynne D. Findlay (from February 22, 2013)
- The Honourable Ernest Preston Manning (from March 6, 2013)
- The Honourable Deborah Grey (from April 22, 2013)
- The Honourable Shelly Glover (from July 15, 2013)
- The Honourable Chris Alexander (from July 15, 2013)
- The Honourable Khristinn Kellie Leitch (from July 15, 2013)
- The Honourable Kevin Sorenson (from July 15, 2013)
- The Honourable Pierre Poilievre (from July 15, 2013)
- The Honourable Candice Bergen (from July 15, 2013)
- The Honourable Greg Rickford (from July 15, 2013)
- The Honourable Michelle Rempel (from July 15, 2013)
- The Honourable L. Yves Fortier (from August 8, 2013)
- The Honourable Claude Carignan (from September 3, 2013)
- The Honourable Gerald J. Comeau (from September 19, 2013)
- The Honourable Deepak Obhrai (from September 19, 2013)
- The Honourable Cyril Eugene McLean (from March 6, 2014)
- The Honourable Ed Holder (from March 19, 2014)
- His Royal Highness The Prince of Wales (Charles Philip Arthur George) (from May 18, 2014)
- The Honourable Wayne G. Wouters (from December 10, 2014)
- The Honourable Erin O'Toole (from January 5, 2015)
- The Honourable Ian Carl Holloway, Q.C. (from January 30, 2015)
- The Honourable Noël A. Kinsella (from February 23, 2015)
- The Honourable Marie-Lucie Morin (from April 20, 2015)

=== J. Trudeau ===
- The Right Honourable Justin P.J. Trudeau (from November 4, 2015)
- The Honourable William Francis Morneau (from November 4, 2015)
- The Honourable Jody Wilson-Raybould (from November 4, 2015)
- The Honourable Judy M. Foote (from November 4, 2015)
- The Honourable Chrystia Freeland (from November 4, 2015)
- The Honourable Jane Philpott (from November 4, 2015)
- The Honourable Jean-Yves Duclos (from November 4, 2015)
- The Honourable Marc Garneau (from November 4, 2015)
- The Honourable Marie-Claude Bibeau (from November 4, 2015)
- The Honourable James Gordon Carr (from November 4, 2015)
- The Honourable Mélanie Joly (from November 4, 2015)
- The Honourable Diane Lebouthillier (from November 4, 2015)
- The Honourable Kent Hehr (from November 4, 2015)
- The Honourable Catherine McKenna (from November 4, 2015)
- The Honourable Harjit Singh Sajjan (from November 4, 2015)
- The Honourable MaryAnn Mihychuk (from November 4, 2015)
- The Honourable Amarjeet Sohi (from November 4, 2015)
- The Honourable Maryam Monsef (from November 4, 2015)
- The Honourable Carla Qualtrough (from November 4, 2015)
- The Honourable Hunter Tootoo (from November 4, 2015)
- The Honourable Kirsty Duncan (from November 4, 2015)
- The Honourable Patricia A. Hajdu (from November 4, 2015)
- The Honourable Bardish Chagger (from November 4, 2015)
- The Honourable Andrew Leslie (from February 15, 2016)
- The Honourable Ginette Petitpas Taylor (from February 15, 2016)
- The Honourable V. Peter Harder (from April 6, 2016)
- The Honourable François-Philippe Champagne (from January 10, 2017)
- The Honourable Karina Gould (from January 10, 2017)
- The Honourable Ahmed Hussen (from January 10, 2017)
- The Honourable Pablo Rodríguez (from January 26, 2017)
- The Honourable Seamus Thomas Harris O'Regan (from August 28, 2017)
- The Honourable Andrew Scheer (from September 25, 2017)
- The Right Honourable Richard Wagner (from December 18, 2017)
- The Honourable David McGuinty (from January 8, 2018)
- The Right Honourable David Johnston (from March 26, 2018)
- The Honourable William Sterling Blair (from July 18, 2018)
- The Honourable Mary F. Y. Ng (from July 18, 2018)
- The Honourable Filomena Tassi (from July 18, 2018)
- The Honourable Jonathan Wilkinson (from July 18, 2018)
- The Honourable Mark Holland (from September 14, 2018)
- The Honourable David Lametti (from January 14, 2019)
- The Honourable Bernadette Jordan (from January 14, 2019)
- The Honourable Joyce Murray (from March 18, 2019)
- The Honourable Marco E.L. Mendicino (from November 20, 2019)
- The Honourable Steven Guilbeault (from November 20, 2019)
- The Honourable Anita Anand (from November 20, 2019)
- The Honourable Mona Fortier (from November 20, 2019)
- The Honourable Marc Miller (from November 20, 2019)
- The Honourable Deborah Schulte (from November 20, 2019)
- The Honourable Daniel Vandal (from November 20, 2019)
- The Honourable Marc Gold (from January 27, 2020)
- The Honourable Omar Alghabra (from February 6, 2020)
- The Honourable Randy Paul Andrew Boissonnault (from October 26, 2021)
- The Honourable Sean Simon Andrew Fraser (from October 26, 2021)
- The Honourable Gudrid Ida Hutchings (from October 26, 2021)
- The Honourable Marci Ien (from October 26, 2021)
- The Honourable Helena Jaczek (from October 26, 2021)
- The Honourable Kamal Khera (from October 26, 2021)
- The Honourable Pascale St-Onge (from October 26, 2021)
- The Honourable Steven MacKinnon (from November 5, 2021)
- The Honourable Greg Fergus (from December 10, 2021)
- The Honourable Rob Oliphant (from December 10, 2021)
- The Honourable Ian Shugart (from September 26, 2022)
- The Honourable George Furey (from May 12, 2023)
- The Honourable Gary Anandasangaree (from July 26, 2023)
- The Honourable Terry Beech (from July 26, 2023)
- The Honourable Soraya Martinez Ferrada (from July 26, 2023)
- The Honourable Ya'ara Saks (from July 26, 2023)
- The Honourable Jenna Sudds (from July 26, 2023)
- The Honourable Rechie Valdez (from July 26, 2023)
- The Honourable Arif Virani (from July 26, 2023)
- The Honourable Ruby Sahota (from January 19, 2024)
- The Honourable Anthony Rota (from December 18, 2024)
- The Honourable Kevin Mark Lamoureux (from December 18, 2024)
- The Honourable Rachel Bendayan (from December 20, 2024)
- The Honourable Élisabeth Brière (from December 20, 2024)
- The Honourable Terry Duguid (from December 20, 2024)
- The Honourable Nathaniel Erskine-Smith (from December 20, 2024)
- The Honourable Darren Fisher (from December 20, 2024)
- The Honourable Joanne Thompson (from December 20, 2024)

=== Carney ===
- The Right Honourable Mark Carney (from March 14, 2025)
- The Honourable Kody Blois (from March 14, 2025)
- The Honourable Ali Cyrus Ehsassi (from March 14, 2025)
- The Honourable Arielle Kayabaga (from March 14, 2025)
- The Honourable Shafqat Ali (from May 13, 2025)
- The Honourable Rebecca Alty (from May 13, 2025)
- The Honourable Rebecca Chartrand (from May 13, 2025)
- The Honourable Julie Aviva Dabrusin (from May 13, 2025)
- The Honourable Lena Metlege Diab (from May 13, 2025)
- The Honourable Mandy Gull-Masty (from May 13, 2025)
- The Honourable Timothy Hodgson (from May 13, 2025)
- The Honourable Joël Lightbound (from May 13, 2025)
- The Honourable Heath MacDonald (from May 13, 2025)
- The Honourable Jill McKnight (from May 13, 2025)
- The Honourable Marjorie Michel (from May 13, 2025)
- The Honourable Eleanor Angela Olszewski (from May 13, 2025)
- The Honourable Gregor Robertson (from May 13, 2025)
- The Honourable Maninder Sidhu (from May 13, 2025)
- The Honourable Evan Solomon (from May 13, 2025)
- The Honourable Buckley Belanger (from May 13, 2025)
- The Honourable Stephen Bradley Fuhr (from May 13, 2025)
- The Honourable Anna Gainey (from May 13, 2025)
- The Honourable Wayne Long (from May 13, 2025)
- The Honourable Stephanie McLean (from May 13, 2025)
- The Honourable Nathalie Provost (from May 13, 2025)
- The Honourable Randeep Singh Sarai (from May 13, 2025)
- The Honourable Adam van Koeverden (from May 13, 2025)
- The Honourable John Zerucelli (from May 13, 2025)
- The Honourable Mark Gerretsen (from May 20, 2025)
- Her Majesty Queen Camilla (from May 26, 2025)

== See also ==
- List of current members of the King's Privy Council for Canada
- List of members of the Privy Council for Canada (1867–1911)
- List of members of the Privy Council for Canada (1911–1948)
- List of members of the Privy Council for Canada (1948–1968)
- List of members of the Privy Council for Canada (1968–2005)
