= List of Canadian members of the Privy Council of the United Kingdom =

According to The Canadian Honours System, prior to 1968, 36 Canadian office-holders had been appointed to the Privy Council of the United Kingdom, sometimes known in Canada as the Imperial Privy Council. Counsellors have the prenominal title of "Right Honourable" and the postnominal title "PC", for Privy Counsellor. Several Governors General were appointed to the council, if they were not already members, while Canadian prime ministers were also appointed, with three exceptions (Alexander Mackenzie, John Abbott and Mackenzie Bowell). Chief Justices were also sworn in, which allowed them to sit on the Judicial Committee of the Privy Council, which was the highest court of appeal for Canada until 1949. Some High Commissioners to London were also sworn into the Imperial Privy Council, as well as a few federal cabinet ministers on the recommendation of the Canadian prime minister.

When Canadian appointments to the Imperial Privy Council ended in 1968, the Canadian Privy Council began awarding the title of "Right Honourable" to the Prime Minister, Chief Justice and select Canadians.

In addition, some Canadians living in the UK, such as the British prime minister, Andrew Bonar Law, were appointed to the Privy Council in connection with their involvement in UK politics.

== Governors General ==
- Earl of Minto (1901-1904) (11 August 1902)
- Earl of Bessborough (1931-1935) (20 March 1931)
- Lord Tweedsmuir (1935-1940) (28 May 1937)

== Prime Ministers ==
- Sir John A. Macdonald
- Sir John Sparrow David Thompson
- Sir Charles Tupper
- Sir Wilfrid Laurier
- Sir Robert Borden
- Arthur Meighen
- Mackenzie King
- R.B. Bennett (1930-1935) (27 October 1930)
- John Diefenbaker
- Lester B. Pearson

== Chief Justices ==
- Sir Samuel Henry Strong (1892-1902)
- Sir Henri-Elzéar Taschereau (1902-1906)
- Sir Charles Fitzpatrick (1906-1918)
- Sir Louis Henry Davies (1918-1924)
- Francis Alexander Anglin (1924-1933)
- Sir Lyman Poore Duff (1933-1944)
- Thibaudeau Rinfret (1944-1954)

== High Commissioners to the United Kingdom ==
- Lord Strathcona (1906-1914)
- Sir George Halsey Perley (1914-1922)
- Vincent Massey (1935-1946) (6 June 1941)

== Other, by date of appointment ==
- Sir John Rose, unofficial envoy to UK government, Receiver-General of the Duchy of Cornwall (1883–1888) (3 August 1886)
- Sir Richard John Cartwright, Minister of Trade and Commerce (1896-1911) (19 November 1902)
- William Stevens Fielding, Minister of Finance (1896-1911) (24 August 1909)
- Sir George Eulas Foster, Minister of Trade and Commerce (1911-1917) (27 June 1916)
- Charles Doherty, Minister of Justice (1911-1921), Canadian Representative at Peace Conference (1 January 1920)
- Arthur Sifton, Canadian Representative at Peace Conference (1 January 1920)
- Sir William Thomas White, Acting Prime Minister during absence of the Prime Minister at the Peace Conference (1 January 1920)
- George Perry Graham, Minister of Railways and Canals (1923-1926) (25 June 1925)
- Sir William Mulock, Chief Justice of Ontario (1923-1936) (25 June 1925)
- Ernest Lapointe, Minister of Justice (1935–1941) (28 May, 1937)
- James Lorimer Ilsley, Minister of Finance (1940-1946) (28 December 1945)
- Louis Saint Laurent, Minister of Justice (1941-1946) (28 December 1945)
- C. D. Howe, Minister of Reconstruction and Supply (1945-1948) (13 June 1946)
- James Garfield Gardiner, Minister of Agriculture (1935-1957) (1 January 1947)
- Ian Alistair Mackenzie, Minister of Veteran Affairs (1944-1948) (1 January 1947)

== Governors General already members of the Imperial Privy Council ==
The following were already members of the Imperial Privy Council before their appointment as Governor General of Canada:

- Lord Lisgar (1869–1872) (28 December 1852)
- Earl of Dufferin (1872-1878) (12 December 1868)
- Marquess of Lorne (1878-1883) (17 March 1875)
- Lord Stanley (1888-1893) (2 April 1878)
- Earl of Aberdeen (1893–1896) (6 February 1886)
- Earl Grey (1904-1910) (11 August 1902)
- Duke of Connaught (1911-1916) (16 May 1861)
- Duke of Devonshire (1916–1921) (26 March 1878)
- Earl of Athlone (1940-1946) (29 June 1931)

== Governors General appointed after their terms expired ==
- Viscount Monck (1867–1868) (7 August 1869)
- Marquess of Lansdowne (1883–1888) (4 July 1895)

== Canadians appointed for service to the United Kingdom ==
While there was no separate Canadian citizenship prior to 1947, these privy counsellors were born in Canada or its predecessor provinces.

- Sir Gilbert Parker, MP (1900-1918) (27 June 1916)
- Lord Beaverbrook, Chancellor of the Duchy of Lancaster (1918) (4 March 1918)
- Andrew Bonar Law, Prime Minister (1922-1923)

== Appointments from Newfoundland ==
Newfoundland would only join Confederation in 1949. Before 1949, Newfoundland was a Dominion of the British Empire like Canada. None of the people listed were citizens of Canada.

- Sir William Whiteway, Premier of the Colony of Newfoundland (1878-1885, 1889-1894, 1895-1897) (9 July 1897)
- Sir Robert Bond, Premier of Newfoundland Colony (1900-1907) Prime Minister of the Dominion of Newfoundland (1907–1909) (11 August 1902)
- Sir Edward Morris (later Lord Morris), Prime Minister of the Dominion of Newfoundland (1909-1917) (5 July 1911)
- Sir William F. Lloyd, Prime Minister of the Dominion of Newfoundland (1918-1919) (25 June 1918)
- Sir Richard Squires, Prime Minister of the Dominion of Newfoundland (1919-1923, 1928-1932) (27 October 1930)

Sir Gordon Macdonald (later Lord Macdonald), Governor of Newfoundland (1946-1949) was appointed to the Imperial Privy Council in 1951. (Note: Macdonald was not a Newfoundlander, he was born in Wales.)
