= Baljit Singh Chadha =

Canadian businessman

Baljit Singh Chadha P.C. (born 1951) is a Canadian businessman based in Montreal, Quebec, who is the president and founder of Balcorp Limited which he started in 1976.The company has offices in Montreal, New Delhi and Mumbai. He is a leader of the Sikh community in Canada. Chadha immigrated to Canada in 1973 from India. His international trading company's interests include agricultural food products, processed foods, forestry products, and minerals.

== Professional life ==
The Hon. Baljit Singh Chadha was born in Bombay (Mumbai) in 1951, and graduated from Bombay University with a Bachelor of Science degree before immigrating to Canada. He later obtained a DBA at the Richard Ivey School of Business at the University of Western Ontario and an MBA from Concordia University. He is one of the Directors of the Canada India Business Council (C-IBC) He founded his own business, Balcorp Limited, in Montreal in 1976, later opening offices in Bombay and New Delhi. Balcorp is now an international marketer of a broad range of products and services. He was on the Board of Governors of Concordia University and is a major benefactor to the institution.

In 2003, the Right Honourable Jean Chrétien, Prime Minister of Canada, named Mr. Chadha to the Security Intelligence Review Committee, as well as to the Queen’s Privy Council of Canada.

== Security Intelligence Review Committee Tenure ==
In 2003 Chadha was appointed by then-prime minister Jean Chrétien for a five-year term position at the Security Intelligence Review Committee, the body that oversees CSIS, Canada's spy agency, in Ottawa and was, as a condition for his participation in the Committee, also appointed to the Queen's Privy Council for Canada.

He sat on the Security Intelligence Review Committee from 2003 to 2008.

Baljit S. Chadha was one of the members of the spy agency watchdog on September 18, 2006, the Commission of Inquiry into the Actions of Canadian Officials in Relation to Maher Arar led by Justice Dennis O'Connor released its report.

The Committee was chaired by Gary Filmon, P.C., O.M., who had been appointed Chair on June 24, 2005. The other Members were Raymond Speaker, P.C., O.C., Baljit S. Chadha, P.C., Roy Romanow, P.C., O.C., Q.C. and Aldéa Landry, P.C., C.M., Q.C..

== Personal life ==
He is married to Roshi Chadha. The couple lives in Montreal.

She was a member-at-large on McGill University's Board of Governors and also served on the governing body of the Canadian Red Cross.
