= List of current members of the King's Privy Council for Canada =

Members of the King's Privy Council for Canada use the title The Honourable if they are ordinary members. Prime Ministers, Governors General and Chief Justices automatically are given the title The Right Honourable. While Governors General have the right to the title Right Honourable upon being sworn into office they are not inducted into the Privy Council until the end of their term unless they were previously members of the council by virtue of another office. Other eminent individuals such as prominent former Cabinet ministers are sometimes also given the title Right Honourable. Leaders of opposition parties and provincial premiers are not automatically inducted into the Privy Council. Opposition leaders are brought in from time to time either to commemorate a special event such as the Canadian Centennial in 1967, the patriation of the Constitution or, in order to allow them to be advised on sensitive issues of national security under the Security of Information Act. Paul Martin inaugurated a practice of inducting parliamentary secretaries into the Privy Council but this has not been continued by his successors.

== Current members of the King's Privy Council for Canada (year sworn in) ==
=== Royal consort ===
- Her Majesty Queen Camilla (2025)

=== Former governors general ===
- The Right Honourable Edward Schreyer (1984)
- The Right Honourable Adrienne Clarkson (2005)
- The Right Honourable Michaëlle Jean (2012)
- The Right Honourable David Johnston (2018)

=== Current and former prime ministers ===
- The Right Honourable Jean Chrétien (1967)
- The Right Honourable Joe Clark (1979)
- The Right Honourable Kim Campbell (1989)
- The Right Honourable Paul Martin (1993)
- The Right Honourable Stephen Harper (2004)
- The Right Honourable Justin Trudeau (2015)
- The Right Honourable Mark Carney (2025)

=== Current and former Chief Justices of Canada ===
- The Right Honourable Beverley McLachlin (2000)
- The Right Honourable Richard Wagner (2017)

=== Current and former Cabinet ministers (by prime minister at induction) ===
==== Pierre Trudeau ====
- The Honourable Otto Emil Lang (1968)
- The Honourable André Ouellet (1972)
- The Honourable J. Judd Buchanan (1974)
- The Honourable Jean-Jacques Blais (1976)

==== Joe Clark ====
- The Honourable David Samuel Horne MacDonald (1979)
- The Honourable David Crombie (1979)
- The Honourable Henry Perrin Beatty (1979)

==== Pierre Trudeau (second ministry) ====
- The Honourable Charles Lapointe (1980)
- The Honourable Yvon Pinard (1980)
- The Honourable Lloyd Axworthy (1980)
- The Honourable Paul James Cosgrove (1980)
- The Honourable Judith A. Erola (1980)
- The Honourable Jacob Austin (1981)
- The Honourable Serge Joyal (1981)
- The Honourable David Collenette (1983)
- The Honourable Céline Hervieux-Payette (1983)
- The Honourable Roger Simmons (1983)
- The Honourable Roy MacLaren (1983)
- The Honourable Joseph Mario Jacques Olivier (1984)

==== John Turner ====
- The Honourable Herb Breau (1984)
- The Honourable Joseph Roger Rémi Bujold (1984)

==== Brian Mulroney ====
- The Honourable Jack Burnett Murta (1984)
- The Honourable Otto Jelinek (1984)
- The Honourable Walter Franklin McLean (1984)
- The Honourable Thomas McMillan (1984)
- The Honourable André Bissonnette (1984)
- The Honourable Benoît Bouchard (1984)
- The Honourable Michel Côté (1984)
- The Honourable Barbara McDougall (1984)
- The Honourable Lowell Murray (1986)
- The Honourable Pierre H. Cadieux (1986)
- The Honourable Jean Charest (1986)
- The Honourable Thomas Hockin (1986)
- The Honourable Monique Landry (1986)
- The Honourable Bernard Valcourt (1986)
- The Honourable Gerry Weiner (1986)
- The Honourable Douglas Grinslade Lewis (1987)
- The Honourable Pierre Blais (1987)
- The Honourable Lucien Bouchard (1988)
- The Honourable Gerry St. Germain (1988)
- The Honourable Mary Collins (1989)
- The Honourable Marcel Danis (1990)
- The Honourable Pauline Browes (1991)
- The Honourable Pierre H. Vincent (1993)

==== Kim Campbell ====
- The Honourable Jim Edwards (1993)
- The Honourable Robert Douglas Nicholson (1993)
- The Honourable Peter McCreath (1993)
- The Honourable Ian Angus Ross Reid (1993)
- The Honourable Larry Schneider (1993)
- The Honourable Garth Turner (1993)

==== Jean Chrétien ====
- The Honourable David Anderson (1993)
- The Honourable Ralph Goodale (1993)
- The Honourable David Dingwall (1993)
- The Honourable Brian Tobin (1993)
- The Honourable Sheila Copps (1993)
- The Honourable Sergio Marchi (1993)
- The Honourable John Manley (1993)
- The Honourable Douglas Young (1993)
- The Honourable Art Eggleton (1993)
- The Honourable Marcel Massé (1993)
- The Honourable Anne McLellan (1993)
- The Honourable Allan Rock (1993)
- The Honourable Ethel Blondin-Andrew (1993)
- The Honourable Lawrence MacAulay (1993)
- The Honourable Raymond Chan (1993)
- The Honourable Fernand Robichaud (1993)
- The Honourable Jon Gerrard (1993)
- The Honourable Lucienne Robillard (1995)
- The Honourable Jane Stewart (1996)
- The Honourable Stéphane Dion (1996)
- The Honourable Pierre Pettigrew (1996)
- The Honourable Martin Cauchon (1996)
- The Honourable Don Boudria (1996)
- The Honourable Hedy Fry (1996)
- The Honourable Lyle Vanclief (1997)
- The Honourable Herb Dhaliwal (1997)
- The Honourable Andy Mitchell (1997)
- The Honourable George Baker (1999)
- The Honourable Robert Daniel Nault (1999)
- The Honourable Maria Minna (1999)
- The Honourable Elinor Caplan (1999)
- The Honourable Denis Coderre (1999)
- The Honourable Bernard Boudreau (1999)
- The Honourable Sharon Carstairs (2001)
- The Honourable Robert Thibault (2001)
- The Honourable Rey Pagtakhan (2001)
- The Honourable Susan Whelan (2002)
- The Honourable Gar Knutson (2002)
- The Honourable Denis Paradis (2002)
- The Honourable Gerry Byrne (2002)
- The Honourable Jean Augustine (2002)
- The Honourable Wayne Easter (2002)
- The Honourable Maurizio Bevilacqua (2002)
- The Honourable Paul DeVillers (2002)
- The Honourable Claude Drouin (2002)
- The Honourable Steven W. Mahoney (2003)

==== Paul Martin ====
- The Honourable Albina Guarnieri (2003)
- The Honourable Stan Kazmierczak Keyes (2003)
- The Honourable Joseph McGuire (2003)
- The Honourable Geoff Regan (2003)
- The Honourable Tony Valeri (2003)
- The Honourable David Pratt (2003)
- The Honourable Irwin Cotler (2003)
- The Honourable Judy Sgro (2003)
- The Honourable Hélène Chalifour Scherrer (2003)
- The Honourable Liza Frulla (2003)
- The Honourable Joe Volpe (2003)
- The Honourable Carolyn Bennett (2003)
- The Honourable Jacques Saada (2003)
- The Honourable Joe Fontana (2003)
- The Honourable Scott Brison (2003)
- The Honourable Ujjal Dosanjh (2004)
- The Honourable David Emerson (2004)
- The Honourable Tony Ianno (2004)
- The Honourable Dominic LeBlanc (2004)
- The Honourable Navdeep Singh Bains (2005)
- The Honourable Belinda Stronach (2005)

==== Stephen Harper ====
- The Honourable Jean-Pierre Blackburn (2006)
- The Honourable Marjory LeBreton (2006)
- The Honourable Monte Solberg (2006)
- The Honourable Gary Lunn (2006)
- The Honourable Peter Gordon MacKay (2006)
- The Honourable Loyola Hearn (2006)
- The Honourable Stockwell Day (2006)
- The Honourable Carol Skelton (2006)
- The Honourable Vic Toews (2006)
- The Honourable Rona Ambrose (2006)
- The Honourable Michael D. Chong (2006)
- The Honourable Diane Finley (2006)
- The Honourable Gordon O'Connor (2006)
- The Honourable Beverley J. Oda (2006)
- The Honourable John Baird (2006)
- The Honourable Maxime Bernier (2006)
- The Honourable Lawrence Cannon (2006)
- The Honourable Tony Clement (2006)
- The Honourable Josée Verner (2006)
- The Honourable Michael Fortier (2006)
- The Honourable John Reynolds (2006)
- The Honourable Peter Van Loan (2006)
- The Honourable Jay Hill (2006)
- The Honourable Jason Kenney (2007)
- The Honourable Gerry Ritz (2007)
- The Honourable Helena Guergis (2007)
- The Honourable Christian Paradis (2007)
- The Honourable Diane Ablonczy (2007)
- The Honourable James Moore (2008)
- The Honourable Leona Aglukkaq (2008)
- The Honourable Steven John Fletcher (2008)
- The Honourable Gary Goodyear (2008)
- The Honourable Peter Kent (2008)
- The Honourable Denis Lebel (2008)
- The Honourable Rob Merrifield (2008)
- The Honourable Lisa Raitt (2008)
- The Honourable Lynne Yelich (2008)
- The Honourable Rob Moore (2010)
- The Honourable John Duncan (2010)
- The Honourable Julian Fantino (2011)
- The Honourable Ted Menzies (2011)
- The Honourable Steven Blaney (2011)
- The Honourable Edward Fast (2011)
- The Honourable Joe Oliver (2011)
- The Honourable Peter Penashue (2011)
- The Honourable Tim Uppal (2011)
- The Honourable Alice Wong (2011)
- The Honourable Bal Gosal (2011)
- The Honourable Kerry-Lynne D. Findlay (2013)
- The Honourable Shelly Glover (2013)
- The Honourable Chris Alexander (2013)
- The Honourable Khristinn Kellie Leitch (2013)
- The Honourable Kevin Sorenson (2013)
- The Honourable Pierre Poilievre (2013)
- The Honourable Candice Bergen (2013)
- The Honourable Greg Rickford (2013)
- The Honourable Michelle Rempel (2013)
- The Honourable Ed Holder (2014)
- The Honourable Erin O'Toole (2015)

==== Justin Trudeau ====
- The Honourable William Francis Morneau (2015)
- The Honourable Jody Wilson-Raybould (2015)
- The Honourable Judy M. Foote (2015)
- The Honourable Chrystia Freeland (2015)
- The Honourable Jane Philpott (2015)
- The Honourable Jean-Yves Duclos (2015)
- The Honourable Marie-Claude Bibeau (2015)
- The Honourable Mélanie Joly (2015)
- The Honourable Diane Lebouthillier (2015)
- The Honourable Kent Hehr (2015)
- The Honourable Catherine McKenna (2015)
- The Honourable Harjit Singh Sajjan (2015)
- The Honourable MaryAnn Mihychuk (2015)
- The Honourable Amarjeet Sohi (2015)
- The Honourable Maryam Monsef (2015)
- The Honourable Carla Qualtrough (2015)
- The Honourable Hunter Tootoo (2015)
- The Honourable Patricia A. Hajdu (2015)
- The Honourable Bardish Chagger (2015)
- The Honourable Ginette Petitpas Taylor (2016)
- The Honourable François-Philippe Champagne (2017)
- The Honourable Karina Gould (2017)
- The Honourable Ahmed Hussen (2017)
- The Honourable Seamus O'Regan (2017)
- The Honourable Pablo Rodríguez (2017)
- The Honourable David McGuinty (2018)
- The Honourable William Sterling Blair (2018)
- The Honourable Mary Ng (2018)
- The Honourable Filomena Tassi (2018)
- The Honourable Jonathan Wilkinson (2018)
- The Honourable Mark Holland (2018)
- The Honourable David Lametti (2019)
- The Honourable Bernadette Jordan (2019)
- The Honourable Joyce Murray (2019)
- The Honourable Marco E.L. Mendicino (2019)
- The Honourable Steven Guilbeault (2019)
- The Honourable Anita Anand (2019)
- The Honourable Mona Fortier (2019)
- The Honourable Marc Miller (2019)
- The Honourable Deborah Schulte (2019)
- The Honourable Daniel Vandal (2019)
- The Honourable Omar Alghabra (2020)
- The Honourable Randy Boissonnault (2021)
- The Honourable Sean Fraser (2021)
- The Honourable Gudie Hutchings (2021)
- The Honourable Marci Ien (2021)
- The Honourable Helena Jaczek (2021)
- The Honourable Kamal Khera (2021)
- The Honourable Pascale St-Onge (2021)
- The Honourable Gary Anandasangaree (2023)
- The Honourable Terry Beech (2023)
- The Honourable Soraya Martinez Ferrada (2023)
- The Honourable Ya'ara Saks (2023)
- The Honourable Jenna Sudds (2023)
- The Honourable Rechie Valdez (2023)
- The Honourable Arif Virani (2023)
- The Honourable Ruby Sahota (2024)
- The Honourable Rachel Bendayan (2024)
- The Honourable Élisabeth Brière (2024)
- The Honourable Terry Duguid (2024)
- The Honourable Nathaniel Erskine-Smith (2024)
- The Honourable Darren Fisher (2024)
- The Honourable Joanne Thompson (2024)

==== Mark Carney ====
- The Honourable Arielle Kayabaga (2025)
- The Honourable Kody Blois (2025)
- The Honourable Ali Ehsassi (2025)
- The Honourable Shafqat Ali (2025)
- The Honourable Rebecca Alty (2025)
- The Honourable Rebecca Chartrand (2025)
- The Honourable Julie Dabrusin (2025)
- The Honourable Mandy Gull-Masty (2025)
- The Honourable Tim Hodgson (2025)
- The Honourable Joël Lightbound (2025)
- The Honourable Heath MacDonald (2025)
- The Honourable Jill McKnight (2025)
- The Honourable Lena Metlege Diab (2025)
- The Honourable Marjorie Michel (2025)
- The Honourable Eleanor Olszewski (2025)
- The Honourable Gregor Robertson (2025)
- The Honourable Maninder Sidhu (2025)
- The Honourable Evan Solomon (2025)
- The Honourable Buckley Belanger (2025)
- The Honourable Stephen Fuhr (2025)
- The Honourable Anna Gainey (2025)
- The Honourable Wayne Long (2025)
- The Honourable Stephanie McLean (2025)
- The Honourable Nathalie Provost (2025)
- The Honourable Randeep Sarai (2025)
- The Honourable Adam van Koeverden (2025)
- The Honourable John Zerucelli (2025)

(all those listed joined the Privy Council as Cabinet ministers unless otherwise indicated)

=== Other parliamentarians (not otherwise listed above) ===
==== Former Speakers of the House of Commons ====
- The Honourable Peter Milliken (2012)
- The Honourable Anthony Rota (2024)
- The Honourable Greg Fergus (2021)

==== Former Speakers of the Senate ====
- The Honourable Dan Hays (2007)
- The Honourable George Furey (2023)

==== Current and former government representatives/leaders in the Senate (who were not cabinet ministers) ====
- The Honourable Claude Carignan (2013)
- The Honourable V. Peter Harder (2016)
- The Honourable Marc Gold (2020)
- The Honourable Pierre Moreau (2025)

==== Current and former federal Leaders of His Majesty's Loyal Opposition ====
- The Honourable Grant Hill (2004)
- The Honourable Michael Ignatieff (2010)
- The Honourable Thomas Mulcair (2012)
- The Honourable Preston Manning (2013)
- The Honourable Deborah Grey (2013)
- The Honourable Andrew Scheer (2017)

==== Other former party leaders ====
- The Honourable Audrey McLaughlin (1991)
- The Honourable Bob Rae (1998)

==== Current and former Chief Government Whips (who were not cabinet ministers) ====
- The Honourable Karen Redman (2004)
- The Honourable Andrew Leslie (2016)
- The Honourable Steven MacKinnon (2021)

==== Members of Parliament appointed by nature of being parliamentary secretaries (appointed 2003–2005, only period where all parliamentary secretaries were sworn into Privy Council) ====
- The Honourable John McKay (2003)
- The Honourable Gurbax Malhi (2003)
- The Honourable Larry Bagnell (2003)
- The Honourable Brenda Chamberlain (2003)
- The Honourable Walt Lastewka (2003)
- The Honourable Dan McTeague (2003)
- The Honourable Mark Eyking (2003)
- The Honourable Georges Farrah (2003)
- The Honourable Eleni Bakopanos (2003)
- The Honourable Paul Bonwick (2003)
- The Honourable Joseph Louis Jordan (2003)
- The Honourable Shawn Murphy (2003)
- The Honourable Jim Karygiannis (2003)
- The Honourable David Price (2003)
- The Honourable Roger Gallaway (2003)
- The Honourable Susan Barnes (2003)
- The Honourable André Harvey (2003)
- The Honourable Roy Cullen (2004)
- The Honourable Marlene Jennings (2004)
- The Honourable Judi Longfield (2004)
- The Honourable Paul Harold Macklin (2004)
- The Honourable Patricia Anne Torsney (2004)
- The Honourable Bryon Wilfert (2004)
- The Honourable Sarmite Bulte (2004)

==== Other current and former parliamentarians ====
- The Honourable Lorne Nystrom (1992)
- The Honourable Raymond Speaker (1999)
- The Honourable Frances Lankin (2009)
- The Honourable Rick Casson (2010)
- The Honourable Laurie Hawn (2010)
- The Honourable Ron Cannan (2012)
- The Honourable Mike Lake (2012)
- The Honourable Rob Oliphant (2021)

=== Current and former provincial premiers (not otherwise listed above) ===
- The Honourable Alexander B. Campbell (1967)
- The Honourable Brian Peckford (1982)
- The Honourable David Peterson (1992)
- The Honourable Frank McKenna (1999)
- The Honourable Gary Filmon (2001)
- The Honourable Roy Romanow (2003)
- The Honourable Philippe Couillard (2010)

=== Former Clerks of the Privy Council ===
- The Honourable Paul M. Tellier (1992)
- The Honourable Jocelyne Bourgon (1998)
- The Honourable Kevin G. Lynch (2009)
- The Honourable Wayne Wouters (2014)

=== Former members of the Security Intelligence Review Committee (not otherwise listed above) ===
- The Honourable Baljit Singh Chadha (2003)
- The Honourable Aldéa Landry (2005)
- The Honourable Denis Losier (2008)
- The Honourable L. Yves Fortier (2013)
- The Honourable Cyril Eugene McLean (2014)
- The Honourable Ian Carl Holloway (2015)
- The Honourable Marie-Lucie Morin (2015)

The Canadian Security Intelligence Service Act established the Security Intelligence Review Committee, and required members to be named from members of the King's Privy Council who were not members of the Senate or House of Commons at the time of their appointment. As such, appointees, if not already members of the Privy Council, were sworn in prior to being named to the committee. In 2019, the SIRC was replaced by the National Security and Intelligence Review Agency.

=== Other prominent Canadians ===
- The Honourable John Polanyi (1992)
- The Honourable Richard Cashin (1992)
- The Honourable Charles Bronfman (1992)

While traditionally appointment to the Order of Canada has been utilised to recognize prominent Canadians, Brian Mulroney appointed 18 Canadians to the Privy Council on Canada Day in 1992 in commemoration of Canada's 125th anniversary, and two more (W.O. Mitchell and Maurice Richard) later that year. Conrad Black, who was one of the 18 appointed, was expelled from the Privy Council in 2014 on the recommendation of Prime Minister Stephen Harper.

== Longest-serving current Privy Councillors ==
This is a list of the longest-serving current members of the King's Privy Council for Canada.

Privy Councillor	Role	Appointed
Jean Chrétien	former Cabinet minister; former Prime Minister	1967; 59 years ago
Alexander Campbell	former Premier of Prince Edward Island	1967; 59 years ago
Otto Lang	former Minister of Justice	1968; 58 years ago
André Ouellet	former Minister of Foreign Affairs	1972; 54 years ago
Judd Buchanan	former Minister of Public Works	1974; 52 years ago
Jean-Jacques Blais	former Postmaster General	1976; 50 years ago
Joe Clark	former Prime Minister	1979; 47 years ago
David MacDonald	former Secretary of State for Canada	1979; 47 years ago
David Crombie	former Minister of Health and Welfare	1979; 47 years ago
Perrin Beatty	former Secretary of State for External Affairs	1979; 47 years ago
Charles Lapointe	former Minister of Public Works	1980; 46 years ago
Yvon Pinard	former President of the Privy Council	1980; 46 years ago
Lloyd Axworthy	former Minister of Foreign Affairs	1980; 46 years ago
Paul James Cosgrove	former Minister of Public Works	1980; 46 years ago
Judith A. Erola	former Minister of Consumer and Corporate Affairs	1980; 46 years ago

== See also ==
- Lists of historical members of the Privy Council for Canada
