= King's Privy Council for Canada =

Body of advisers to the monarch of Canada

- Conseil privé du Roi pour le Canada
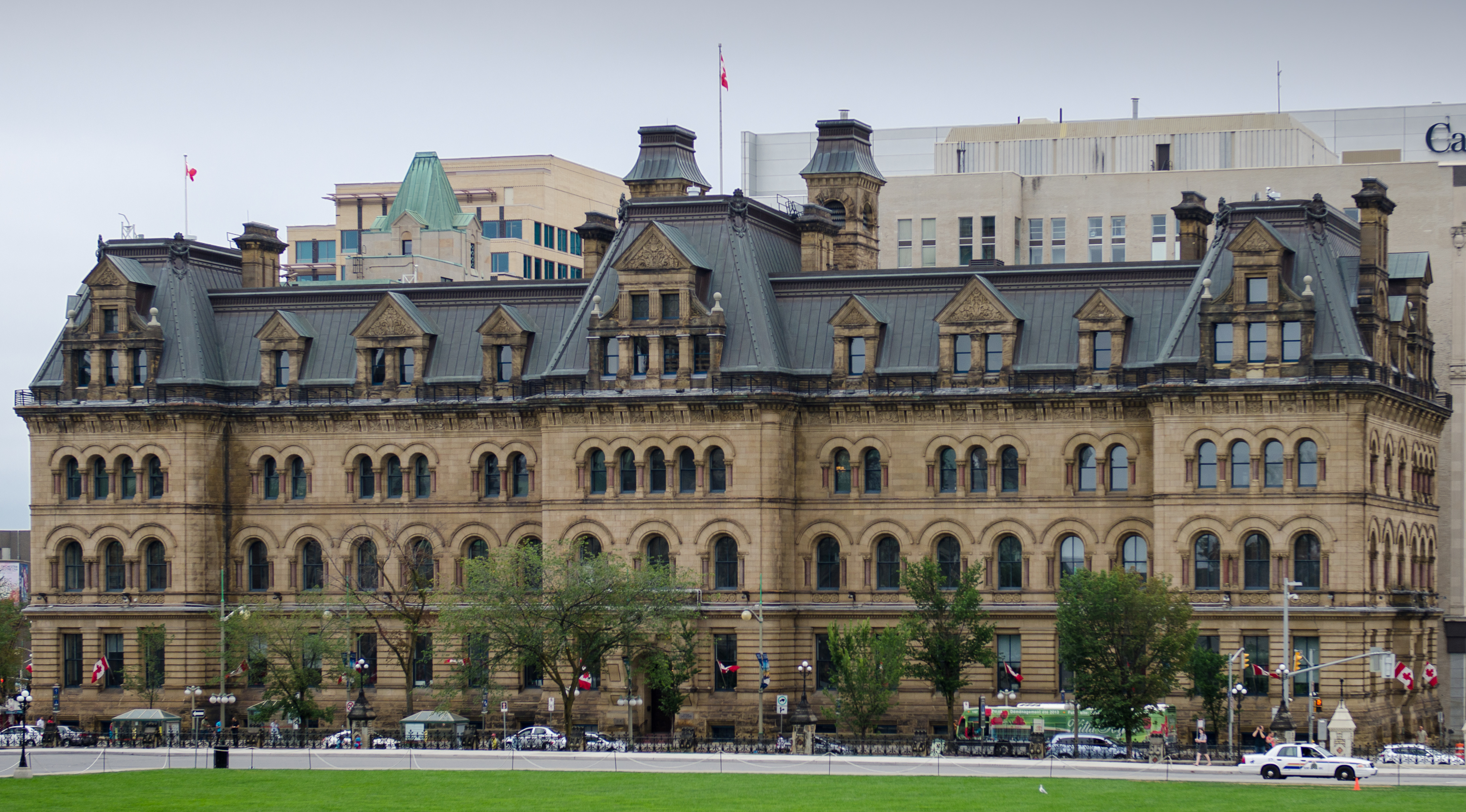
- The Office of the Prime Minister and Privy Council building is the seat of the Privy Council
- Abbreviation: PC
- Formation: 1867
- Legal status: Council of state
- Coordinates: 45°25′25.0″N 75°41′49.2″W
- Members: List of current members
- Monarch: Charles III
- President: Dominic LeBlanc
- Clerk: Michael Sabia
- Subsidiaries: Canadian Ministry; Treasury Board of Canada
- Website: canada.ca/en/privy-council

The King's Privy Council for Canada (French: Conseil privé du Roi pour le Canada), (Note: Referred to as the Queen's Privy Council for Canada (French: Conseil privé de la Reine pour le Canada) during the reign of a female monarch.) sometimes called His Majesty's Privy Council for Canada (Note: Referred to as the Her Majesty's Privy Council for Canada during the reign of a female monarch) or simply the Privy Council (PC), is the full group of personal advisors to the King of Canada on state and constitutional affairs. Practically, the tenets of responsible government require the sovereign or his viceroy, the governor general, almost always to follow only that advice tendered by the Cabinet: a committee within the Privy Council composed usually of elected members of Parliament. Those summoned to the Privy Council are appointed for life by the governor general on the advice of the prime minister. The group is composed predominantly of former Cabinet ministers, with some others having been inducted as an honorary gesture. Privy counsellors are accorded the use of an honorific style and post-nominal letters, as well as various signifiers of precedence.

== King-in-Council ==
The Government of Canada, which is formally referred to as His Majesty's Government, is defined by the Canadian constitution as the sovereign acting on the advice of the Privy Council; what is known as the Governor-in-Council, referring to the governor general of Canada as the King's stand-in. The group of people is described as "a Council to aid and advise in the Government of Canada, to be styled the Queen's Privy Council for Canada", though, by convention, the task of giving the sovereign and governor general advice (in the construct of constitutional monarchy and responsible government, this is typically binding (Note: See § Responsibilities and the note at Cabinet of Canada.)) on how to exercise the royal prerogative via orders-in-council rests with the Cabinet—a committee of the Privy Council made up of other ministers of the Crown who are predominately drawn from, and are responsible to, the House of Commons in the Parliament. This body is distinct but also entwined within the Privy Council, as the president of the King's Privy Council for Canada customarily serves as one of its members and Cabinet ministers receive assistance in the performance of their duties from the Privy Council Office, headed by the clerk of the Privy Council.

While the Cabinet specifically deals with the regular, day-to-day functions of the King-in-Council, occasions of wider national importance—such as the proclamation of a new Canadian sovereign following a demise of the Crown or conferring on royal marriages—will be attended to by more senior officials in the Privy Council, such as the prime minister, the chief justice of Canada, and other senior statesmen; though all privy councillors are invited to such meetings in theory, in practice, the composition of the gathering is determined by the prime minister of the day. The quorum for Privy Council meetings is four.

== Membership ==
The Constitution Act, 1867, outlines that persons are to be summoned and appointed for life to the King's Privy Council by the governor general, though convention dictates that this be done on the advice of the sitting prime minister. As its function is to provide the vehicle for advising the Crown, the members of the Privy Council are predominantly all living current and former ministers of the Crown. In addition, the chief justices of Canada and former governors general are appointed. From time to time, the leader of His Majesty's Loyal Opposition and heads of other opposition parties will be appointed to the Privy Council, either as an honour or to facilitate the distribution of sensitive information under the Security of Information Act. Similarly, it was required by law that the members of the Security Intelligence Review Committee be made privy councillors if they were not already, though this has not been required of the SIRC's successor since 2019, the National Security and Intelligence Review Agency.

To date, only Prime Minister Paul Martin advised that parliamentary secretaries be admitted to the Privy Council.

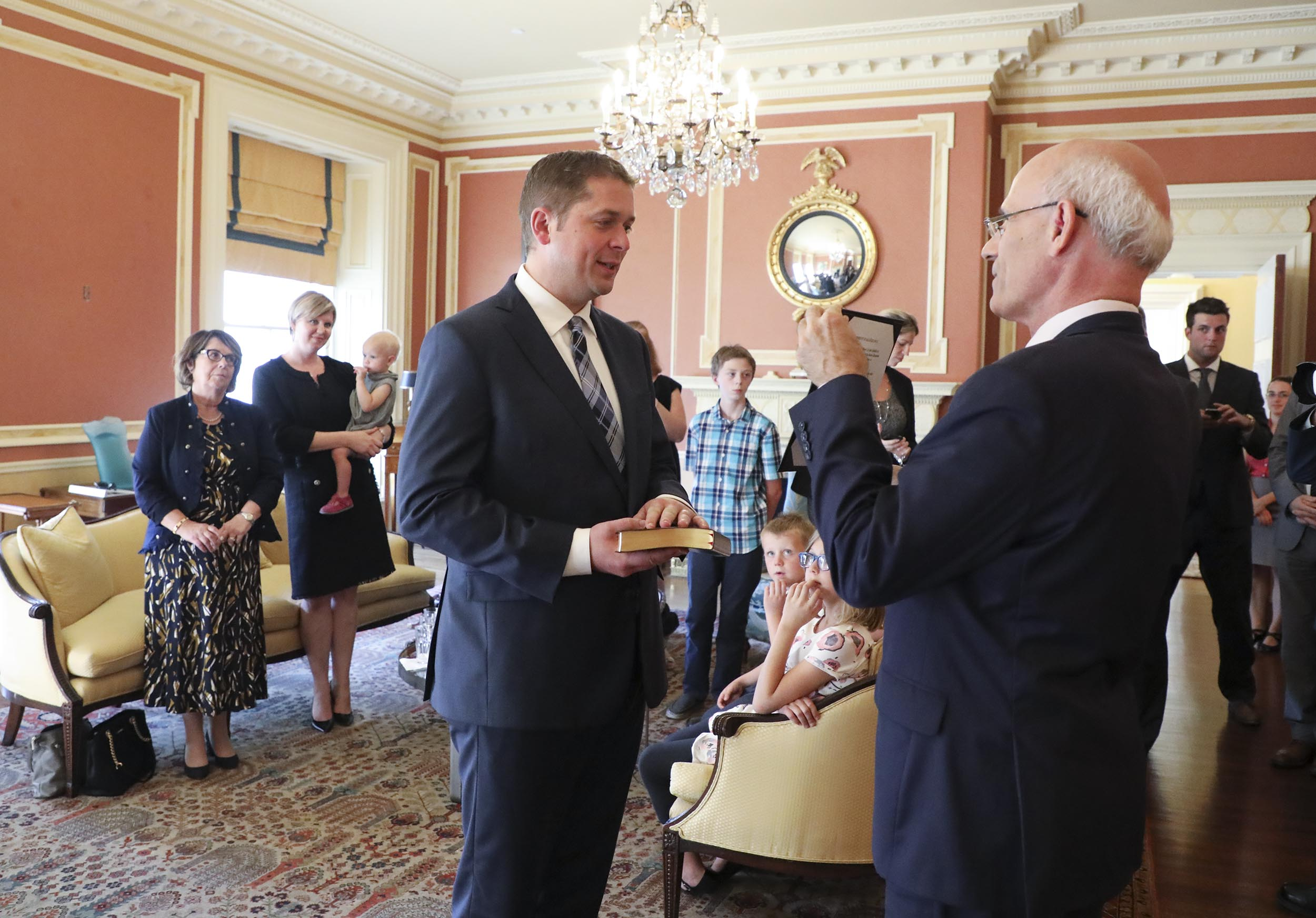
Andrew Scheer, then leader of the opposition, being sworn into the Privy Council at Rideau Hall in 2017

Appointees to the King's Privy Council must recite the requisite oath:

I, [name], do solemnly and sincerely swear (declare) that I shall be a true and faithful servant to His Majesty King Charles III, as a member of His Majesty's Privy Council for Canada. I will in all things to be treated, debated and resolved in Privy Council, faithfully, honestly and truly declare my mind and my opinion. I shall keep secret all matters committed and revealed to me in this capacity, or that shall be secretly treated of in Council. Generally, in all things I shall do as a faithful and true servant ought to do for His Majesty.

Provincial premiers are not commonly appointed to the Privy Council, but have been made members on special occasions, such as the centennial of Confederation in 1967 and the patriation of the constitution of Canada in 1982. On Canada Day in 1992, which also marked the 125th anniversary of Canadian Confederation, Governor General Ramon Hnatyshyn appointed 18 prominent Canadians to the Privy Council, including the former Premier of Ontario David Peterson, retired hockey star Maurice Richard, and businessman Conrad Black (who was later expelled from the Privy Council by the Governor General on the advice of Prime Minister Stephen Harper). The use of Privy Council appointments as purely an honour was not employed again until 6 February 2006, when Harper advised the Governor General to appoint former member of Parliament John Reynolds, along with the new Cabinet. Harper, on 15 October 2007, also advised Governor General Michaëlle Jean to appoint Jim Abbott.

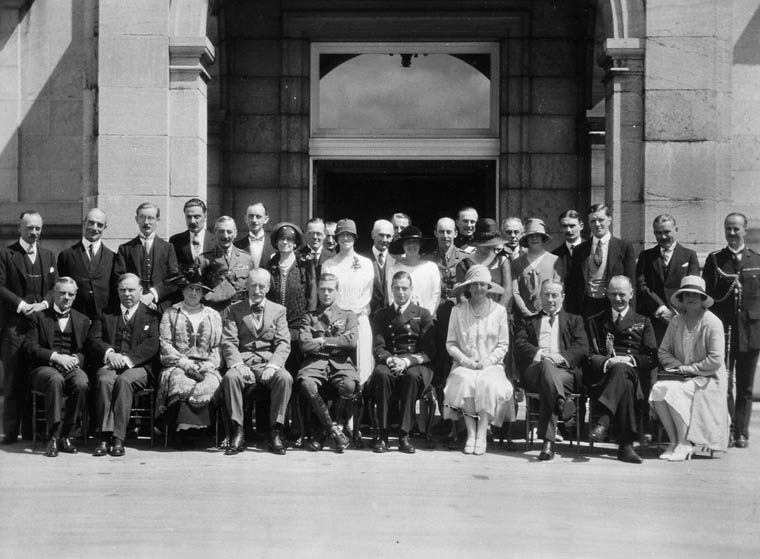
Prince Edward (front row, fifth from left), at Rideau Hall, in Ottawa, two days after being appointed to the King's Privy Council for Canada

Members of the monarch's family have been appointed to the Privy Council: the Prince of Wales (Edward, later King Edward VIII), appointed during the reign of his father, King George V, on 2 August 1927; Prince Philip, Duke of Edinburgh, appointed during the reign of his wife, Queen Elizabeth II, on 14 October 1957; the Prince of Wales (Charles, now King Charles III), appointed during the reign of his mother, Queen Elizabeth II, on 18 May 2014; and Queen Camilla, appointed during the reign of her husband, King Charles III on 26 May 2025.

On occasion, non-Canadians have been appointed to the Privy Council. The first non-Canadian sworn of the council was Billy Hughes, Prime Minister of Australia, who was inducted on 18 February 1916, at the request of Robert Borden—to honour a visiting head of government, but also so that Hughes could attend Cabinet meetings on wartime policy. Similarly, Winston Churchill, Prime Minister of the United Kingdom, was inducted during a visit to Canada on 29 December 1941.

Privy councillors are entitled to the style the Honourable (French: L'honorable) or, for the prime minister, chief justice, or certain other eminent individuals, the Right Honourable (French: Le très honorable) (Note: When the style is held by a woman, the French title is: La très honorable.) and the post-nominal letters PC (in French: CP). Prior to 1967, the style the Right Honourable was only employed in Canada by those appointed to the Imperial Privy Council in London, such persons usually being prime ministers, Supreme Court chief justices, certain senior members of the Canadian Cabinet, and other eminent Canadians. These appointments ended under Lester Pearson, though the traditional style remained in use, limited to only prime ministers and chief justices. In 1992, several eminent privy councillors, most of whom were long-retired from active politics, were granted the style by the Governor General and, in 2002, Jean Chrétien recommended that Herb Gray, a privy councillor of long standing, be given the style the Right Honourable upon his retirement from Parliament.

== History ==
According to Eugene Forsey, Privy Council meetings—primarily meetings of the full Cabinet or the prime minister and senior ministers, held with the governor general presiding—were not infrequent occurrences in the first 15 years following Canadian Confederation in 1867. One example of a Privy Council meeting presided over by the governor general occurred on 15 August 1873, in which Governor General the Earl of Dufferin outlined "the terms on which he would agree to a prorogation of Parliament" during the Pacific Scandal. When he served as viceroy, John Campbell, Marquess of Lorne, put an end to the practice of the governor general presiding over Privy Council meetings, other than for ceremonial occasions.

Prime Minister William Lyon Mackenzie King had the Privy Council convene in 1947 to consent to the marriage of Princess Elizabeth (later Queen Elizabeth II) to Philip Mountbatten, per the Royal Marriages Act 1772. The Princess' father, King George VI, had offered an invitation for Mackenzie King to attend when the Privy Council of the United Kingdom met for the same purpose. But, the Prime Minister declined and held the meeting of the Canadian Privy Council so as to illustrate the separation between Canada's Crown and that of the UK.

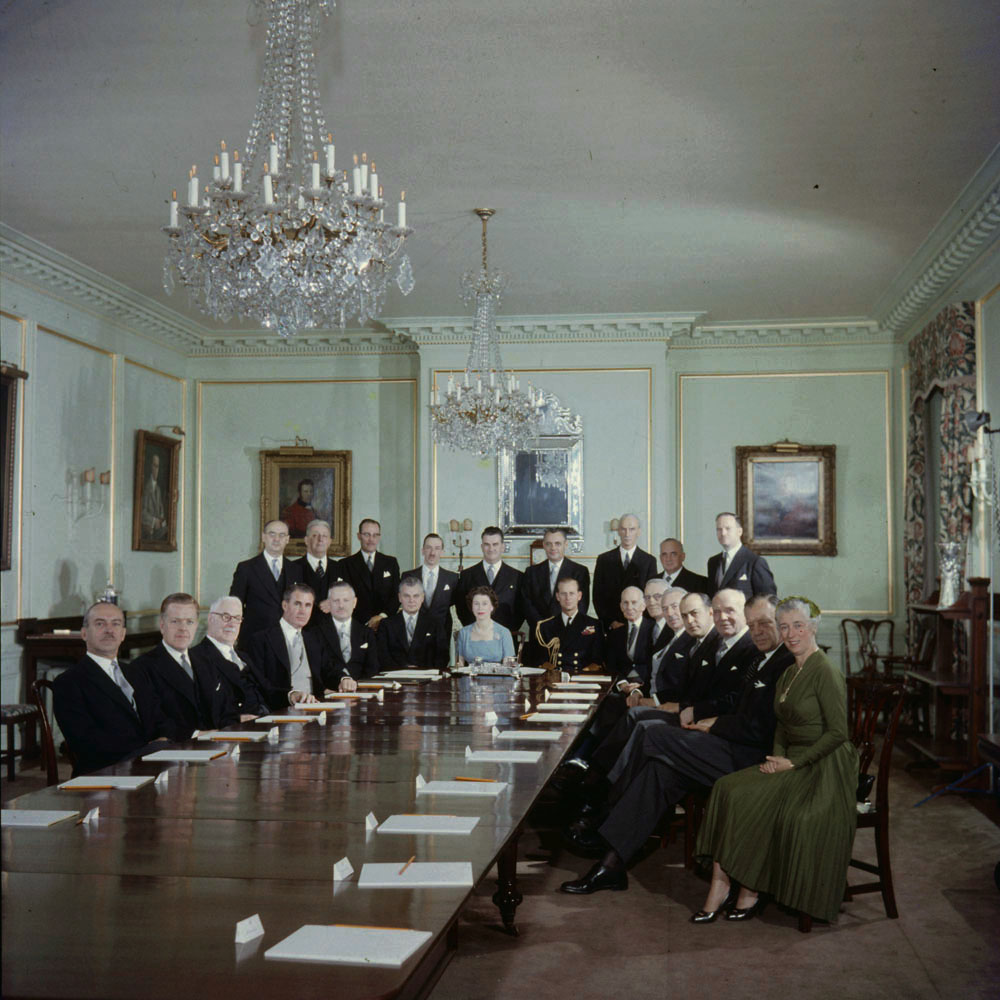
The first meeting of the Privy Council before the reigning sovereign; in the State Dining Room of Rideau Hall. Queen Elizabeth II is seated at centre, with Prince Philip, Duke of Edinburgh, to her left, and Prime Minister John Diefenbaker at her right; 14 October 1957.

The Council has assembled in the presence of the sovereign on two occasions: The first was at 10:00 a.m. on the Thanksgiving Monday of 1957, at the monarch's residence in Ottawa, Rideau Hall. There, Queen Elizabeth II chaired a meeting of 22 of her privy councilors, including her consort, by then titled as Prince Philip, Duke of Edinburgh, who had just been appointed to the Privy Council at that same meeting. The Queen also approved an order-in-council. Two years later, the Privy Council again met before the Queen, this time in Halifax, Nova Scotia, to confirm the appointment of Georges Vanier as governor general. There was originally some speculation that the coming together of the sovereign and her Council was not constitutionally sound. However, the Prime Minister at the time, John Diefenbaker, found no legal impropriety in the idea and desired to create a physical illustration of Elizabeth's position of Queen of Canada being separate to that of Queen of the United Kingdom.

A formal meeting of the Privy Council was held in 1981 to give formal consent to the marriage of Prince Charles, Prince of Wales (now King Charles III), to Lady Diana Spencer. According to a contemporary newspaper account, the conference, on 27 March, at Rideau Hall, consisted of 12 individuals, including Chief Justice Bora Laskin, who presided over the meeting; Prime Minister Pierre Trudeau; several cabinet ministers; Stanley Knowles of the New Democratic Party; and Alvin Hamilton of the Progressive Conservative Party. All gathered were informed of the Prince's engagement, nodded their approval, and then toasted the royal couple with champagne. David Brown, an official in the Privy Council Office, told The Globe and Mail that, had the Privy Council rejected the Prince of Wales' engagement, none of his children would have been considered legitimate heirs to the Canadian throne, thus setting up a potential break in the unified link to the crown of each of the Commonwealth realms, in contradiction to the conventional "treaty" laid out in the preamble to the 1931 Statute of Westminster. Following the announcement of the Prince of Wales' engagement to Camilla Parker-Bowles, however, the Department of Justice announced its conclusion that the Privy Council was not required to meet to give its approval to the marriage, as the union would not result in offspring that would impact the succession to the throne.

To mark the occasion of her Ruby Jubilee, Queen Elizabeth II, on Canada Day, 1992, presided over the swearing in of new members of her Privy Council.

The most recent formal meeting of the Privy Council was on 10 September 2022, for the proclamation of the accession of King Charles III.

== See also ==
- List of current members of the King's Privy Council for Canada
- List of members of the Privy Council for Canada (1867–1911)
- List of members of the Privy Council for Canada (1911–1948)
- List of members of the Privy Council for Canada (1948–1968)
- List of members of the Privy Council for Canada (1968–2005)
- List of members of the Privy Council for Canada (2006–present)
- Executive Council (Canada)
- Executive Council (Commonwealth countries)
- Executive Council of the Province of Canada
- List of Canadian members of the Privy Council of the United Kingdom
