= Controversies surrounding the Royal Canadian Mounted Police =

List of controversial events (1920–present) that involve the RCMP

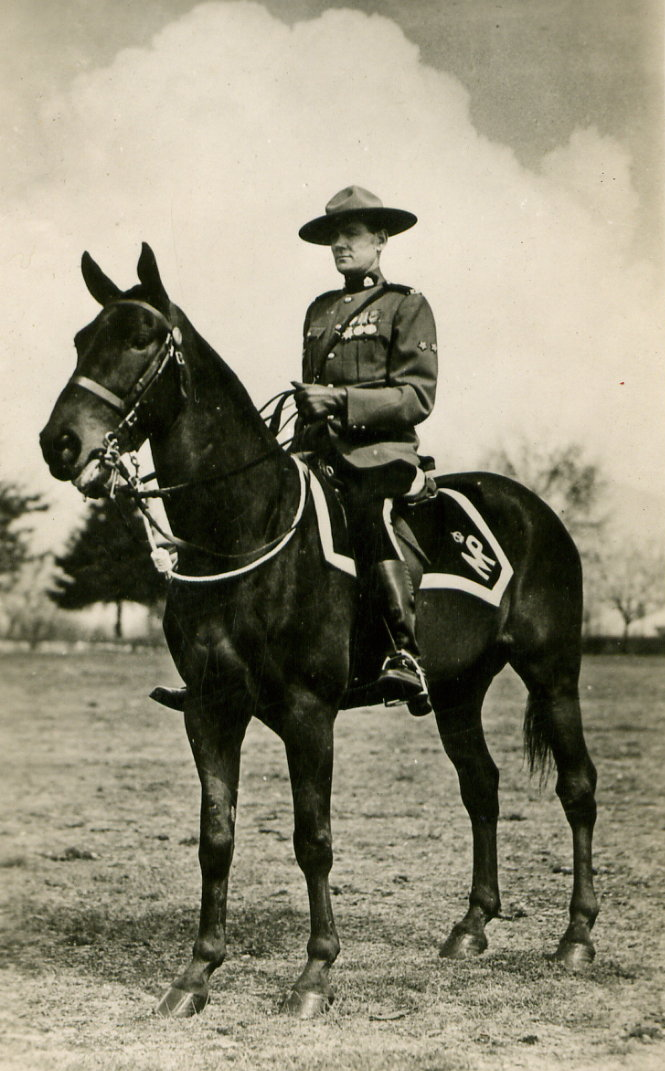
A mounted officer, circa 1920

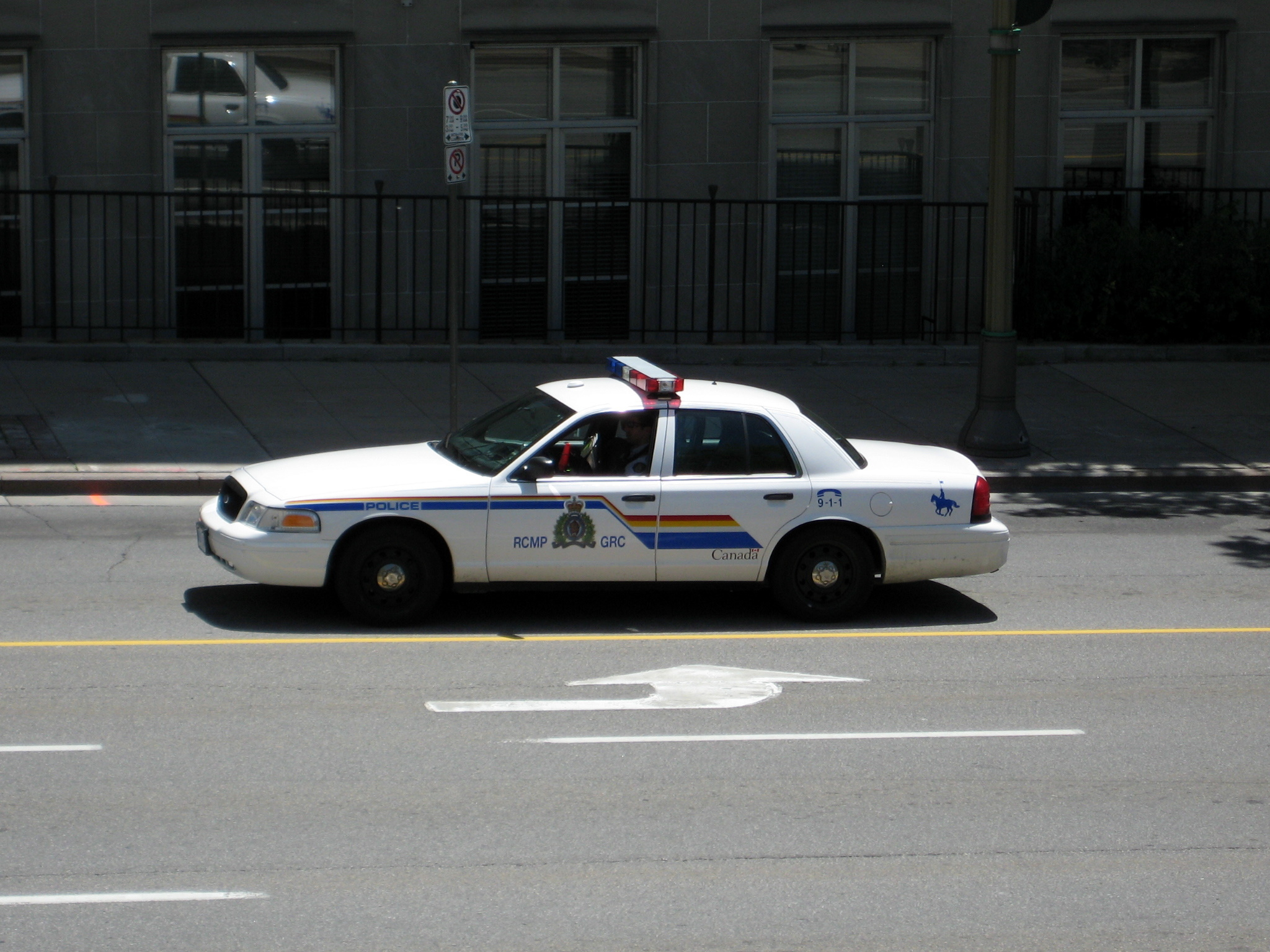
An RCMP cruiser on patrol in Ottawa

The Royal Canadian Mounted Police (RCMP) has a history dating back to 1873 and has been involved in several high-profile controversies.

== Early controversies ==
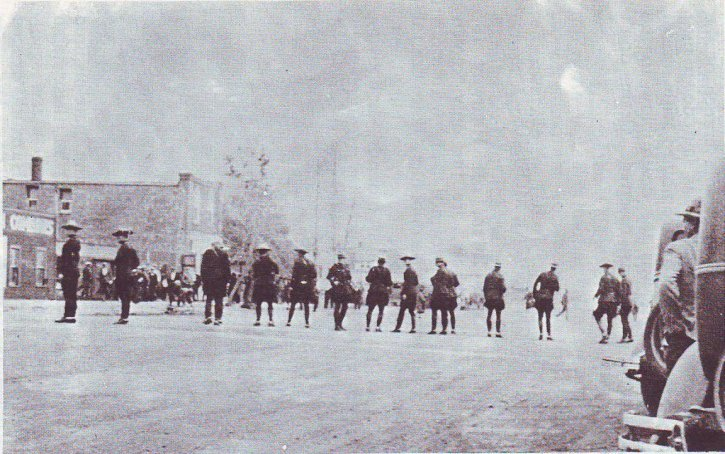
RCMP officers during the Estevan Riot

Until 1920, the RCMP's forerunner, the Royal North-West Mounted Police, operated only in Western Canada and the North. The new organization was created by an amalgamation with the Dominion Police, giving the RCMP a national security mandate as a departure from its earlier role as a frontier police force. Early controversies grew from its preoccupation with Communism and the labour movement. Following from its operations in the Winnipeg General Strike of 1919, the RCMP intervened in labour disputes, not as an impartial law enforcement agency, but to assist with breaking strikes. In one incident, RCMP officers clashed with striking coal miners for 45 minutes in Estevan, Saskatchewan in 1933 and killed three miners during the Estevan Riot. Part of its strategy against labour organizing included extensive use of spies for surveillance of suspected Communists, which was revealed at the court trial that convicted the leadership of the Communist Party under Section 98 of the Criminal Code in 1932. Political surveillance activities were conducted out of its Criminal Investigation Department until a separate branch, the RCMP Security Service, was established in 1950. The RCMP was also the force used to stop the On-to-Ottawa Trek by precipitating another bloody clash that left one Regina city police officer and one protester dead in the 1935 Regina Riot. The Mounties were frequently criticized for these activities by labour and the left, including one of its most prominent surveillance targets, Member of Parliament J. S. Woodsworth. A dispute with the Government of Alberta over prohibition led to the creation of a separate Alberta Provincial Police from 1917 to 1932.

== Killing of Inuit-owned sled dogs ==
During the 1950s, 1960s and 1970s, Royal Canadian Mounted Police and other authorities killed thousands of sled dogs in support of the federal government's efforts during that time to relocate Inuit into modern settlements.

== Intelligence mole ==
In 1967, it was suspected that there was a Soviet infiltrator in the ranks of Canadian intelligence. Suspicion initially fell upon Leslie James Bennett. With Bennett's personal leftist politics, and past acquaintanceship with defector Kim Philby, he was pilloried as the most likely suspect by the RCMP themselves, although the RCMP was asked to investigate Bennett by James Jesus Angleton of the CIA. The accusations and interrogations by the police led to the breakdown of Bennett's marriage and early retirement.

In the 1980s it was discovered that the mole had actually been Sergeant Gilles Brunet, the son of an RCMP assistant commissioner.

== Barn-burning scandal ==
On the night of May 6, 1972, the RCMP Security Service burned down a barn owned by Paul Rose's and Jacques Rose's mother in Sainte-Anne-de-la-Rochelle, Quebec. They suspected that separatists were planning to meet with members of the Black Panthers from the United States. The arson came after they failed to convince a judge to allow them to wiretap the alleged meeting place. This was later admitted by Solicitor General Francis Fox on October 31, 1977.

RCMP Assistant Commissioner Rod Stamler later said that the barn-burning operation was "morally wrong and unlawful" and if the police leadership condones such actions, it will lose control of the (police) force."

Staff Sergeant Donald McCleery (1934-2014) was involved in the operation, and following his retirement from the RCMP ran his own "investigation and surveillance" company in Montreal, Quebec. The firm was acquired by Gardium Sécurité in 2008.

== Theft of PQ members list ==
In 1973, more than thirty members of the RCMP Security Service committed a break-in to steal a computerized members list of Parti Québécois members, in an investigation dubbed Operation Ham. This was later admitted by Solicitor General Francis Fox on October 28, 1977. John Starnes (RCMP), head of the RCMP Security Service, claimed that the purpose of this operation was to investigate allegations that the PQ had funneled $200,000 worth of donations through a Swiss banking account.

== Break-ins and bombing ==
A series of more than 400 illegal break-ins by the RCMP was revealed by Vancouver Sun reporter John Sawatsky in his front-page exposé headline "Trail of break-in leads to RCMP cover-up" on December 7, 1976. The story won the Vancouver Sun the Michener Award that year.

It wasn't until the following year that it was uncovered that the October 6, 1972, break-in at the Agence de Presse Libre du Québec office, had been the work of an RCMP investigation dubbed Operation Bricole, not right-wing militants as previously believed. The small leftist Quebec group had reported more than a thousand significant files missing or damaged following the break-in. One RCMP, one SQ and one SPVM officer pleaded guilty on June 16, 1977, but were given unconditional discharges.

In 1974, RCMP Security Service Corporal Robert Samson was arrested at a hospital after a failed bombing - the bomb exploded while in his hands, causing him to lose some fingers and tearing his eardrums. While this bombing was not sanctioned by the RCMP, at trial he announced that he had done "much worse" on behalf of the RCMP, and admitted he had been involved in the APLQ break-in.

== Inquiries ==
In 1977, the Quebec provincial government launched the Keable Inquiry into Illegal Police Activities, which resulted in 17 members of the RCMP being charged with 44 offences.

In the same year, a Royal Commission was formed by Justice David McDonald titled Royal Commission of Inquiry into Certain Activities of the RCMP to investigate allegations of vast wrongdoing by the national police force. The inquiry's 1981 recommendation was to limit the RCMP's role in intelligence operations, and resulted in the formation of the Canadian Security Intelligence Service three years later.

== The Savoie scandal ==
In 1992 a senior RCMP officer Claude Savoie was exposed as corrupt, causing a major scandal that ended with Savoie shooting himself in his Ottawa office. One of Savoie's subordinates, Jorge Leite, was found guilty of corruption in 1999.

== Excessive use of force at the 1997 APEC Summit ==
In 1997, the APEC summit was held in Vancouver, British Columbia. Controversy arose after officers of the Royal Canadian Mounted Police used pepper spray and strip searches against protesters, who were objecting to the presence of several autocratic leaders such as Indonesian president Suharto. A subsequent public inquiry concluded that the RCMP was at fault, showing a lack of professionalism and a failure in preemptive planning. The report also charged that the Canadian government interfered with police operations, possibly in an effort to shield certain leaders from being publicly embarrassed by the protests.

== Killing of Darren Varley ==
In 1999 RCMP Constable Michael Ferguson fatally shot local resident Darren Varley after being attacked inside the holding cells at a Pincher Creek police station. Ferguson was prosecuted twice for murder, resulting in two hung juries, and was then convicted of the killing and found guilty of manslaughter.

== 1998 Alberta oilsite bombing ==
The RCMP bombed an oilsite in Alberta on October 14, 1998, on the instructions of the Alberta Energy Co. No injuries were caused or intended. The Crown lawyers, representing the government, accepted that the allegations were true. Wiebo Ludwig, an Alberta farmer who claimed pollution from the oil industry caused health effects, was blamed for the bombing.

== Torture scandal: Maher Arar ==
On September 26, 2002, during a stopover in New York City en route from a family vacation in Tunisia to Montreal, Maher Arar was detained by the United States Immigration and Naturalization Service, acting upon information supplied by the RCMP. Arar was sent to Syria where he was imprisoned for more than 10 months, tortured and forced to sign a false confession that he had trained in Al Qaeda camps in Afghanistan. A public campaign ended in his release and won a public inquiry into his case, which found that he had no ties to terrorism.

On September 28, 2006, RCMP Commissioner Giuliano Zaccardelli issued a carefully worded public apology to Arar and his family during the House of Commons committee on public safety and national security:

Mr. Arar, I wish to take this opportunity to express publicly to you and to your wife and to your children how truly sorry I am for whatever part the actions of the RCMP may have contributed to the terrible injustices that you experienced and the pain that you and your family endured.

In a subsequent December 2006 appearance in front of the Commons committee, Zaccardelli said the timeline—regarding what he knew at the time and what he told government ministers—given in his first appearance in September was inaccurate. He resigned the following day.

On January 26, 2007, after months of negotiations between the Canadian government and Arar's Canadian legal counsel, Prime Minister Stephen Harper issued a formal apology "for any role Canadian officials may have played in what happened to Mr. Arar, Monia Mazigh and their family in 2002 and 2003" and announced that Arar would receive $10.5 million settlement for his ordeal and an additional $1 million for legal costs.

== Pension fund scandal ==
In 2004, Andrew McIntosh, an investigative journalist at The National Post, revealed a secret audit that detailed misuse of millions of dollars by the RCMP of its own members' pension fund.

After Commissioner Giuliano Zaccardelli's resignation in 2007, a public accounts committee heard several testimonies from former and serving RCMP officers alleging serious fraud and nepotism at the upper management level under Zaccardelli. The fraud allegations go back to 2002 and are related to RCMP pension and insurance plans for members of the force. Zaccardelli launched and then two days later cancelled a criminal investigation into the matter, which was resumed by the Ottawa Police Service after his resignation. That investigation found serious nepotism and wasteful spending. A follow-up investigation by the Auditor-General found millions of dollars inappropriately charged to the pension and insurance plans.

A subsequent investigation conducted by a former head of the Ontario Securities Commission strongly criticized the management style of Zaccardelli, who, he said, was responsible for "a fundamental breach of trust" and called for a major shake-up of the force. Specifically, RCMP members and employees who attempted to address the pension fund issue suffered "career damage" for doing so, according to the investigators findings. Interim RCMP Commissioner Beverley Busson concurred with the recommendations and promised that individuals that the upper ranks attempted to silence would be thanked and recognized.

== Ian Bush incident ==
On October 29, 2005, Ian Bush, 22 was arrested in Houston, British Columbia. At the RCMP detachment office, Bush died due to a single gunshot wound to the back of the head.

Constable Paul Koester and Bush were alone in the interrogation room. Koester claimed Bush attacked him, and that he was being choked from behind to unconsciousness and acted in self-defence. An investigation was conducted by an RCMP team brought in from another region. That investigation was reviewed by several agencies including the Ministry of the Attorney General of BC, and the federal Civilian Review and Complaints Commission for the Royal Canadian Mounted Police. Koester was cleared of any wrongdoing. The Coroner's Inquest into the death reached the same conclusion.

Conflicting evidence was given at the inquest. The analyses of the blood spatter evidence by an RCMP forensics officer, Jim Hignell, and Edmonton police constable, Joseph Slemko, differed; the former supporting Koester's account, the latter contradicting it.

== Role in the death of Robert Dziekański ==
The death of Robert Dziekański occurred when Dziekański, a Polish immigrant, arrived at the Vancouver International Airport on October 13, 2007. After being released from Customs after a ten-hour delay, he became agitated and violent. Four RCMP officers attempted to arrest Dziekański; one fired a Taser after which Dziekański fell to the ground. He was then pinned and handcuffed by the officers, and then Tasered repeatedly until he lost consciousness. Testimony from the officers differs regarding whether or not Dziekański's pulse was checked, but when paramedics arrived approximately 15 minutes later he could not be resusciated, and he was declared dead at the scene. Police were heavily criticized for their handling of the incident, and the incident has revived debate concerning police use of tasers in Canada. A public inquiry into the incident ruled Dziekański's death a homicide, and two of the officers were convicted of perjury for giving false statements to the inquiry regarding their actions in the incident.

== Royal Inland Hospital taser incident ==
In May 2008, at Royal Inland Hospital in Kamloops, an RCMP officer used a taser on 82-year-old Frank Lasser while he was in his hospital bed. He was reportedly "delirious" and wielding a knife.

== Funding of criticism of Insite ==
In October 2008, it was revealed that the RCMP had used taxpayer money to pay individuals to write negative reports about the Vancouver safe injection site, Insite. In addition to this, memos were distributed referring to British Columbia's Centre for Excellence in HIV/AIDS as the "Centre for Excrements", and suggesting stacking radio shows with callers against Insite.

== Mountie takes woman home from jail ==
In 2011, a northern Manitoba RCMP officer took an intoxicated woman he had arrested out of a cell and to his home to "pursue a personal relationship." Several of his colleagues witnessed this but only two reported it. The constable admitted to the allegations, got a reprimand and lost pay for seven days. The Nisichawayasihk Cree Nation has called for an independent investigation.

== Criticism from SCC on failure to protect wife who hired hitman ==
In January 2013, the Supreme Court of Canada criticized the RCMP for pursuing charges against Nicole Doucet Ryan (also known as Nicole Patricia Ryan) after she attempted to hire an undercover officer as a hitman to kill her husband. The criticisms were based on her post-arrest courtroom allegations of abuse and on her testimony that she had called the RCMP to report the abuse but received no help. The former husband was never called to appear in court but refuted that he was abusive. After an internal investigation the RCMP stated that no allegations of abuse were ever brought forward by Nicole Ryan. On February 6, it was announced that The Civilian Review and Complaints Commission for the Royal Canadian Mounted Police would investigate the allegations.

== High River weapons search ==
On June 21, 2013, High River, Alberta suffered major flooding; the residents were evacuated, and the town searched for anyone stranded. By June 24, High River RCMP reported to Edmonton that they had completed their search of every home in town, 3,337 in all. After June 24 the RCMP checked approximately 1900 homes for firearms. The check continued until July 10.

== Discrimination against women ==
=== Janet Merlo claim of misconduct ===
In 2007 Janet Merlo filed a claim of harassment and misconduct against the RCMP stating that their continual abuse over a decade of service had led to depression and post-traumatic stress disorder. In 2015, hearings were held to determine if her case should be elevated to a class action, as nearly 400 other women officers had asked to join it.

=== Sherry Lee Benson-Podolchuk ===
In 2007, Sherry Lee Benson-Podolchuk wrote and published Women Not Wanted, which detailed her experiences with frequent harassment during her 20-year career as the sole female officer in the Prairie region at the time. Benson-Podolchuk sued the RCMP, eventually settling out of court in 2009.

=== Catherine Galliford claim of sexual harassment ===
In November 2011, Corporal Catherine Galliford, a former spokeswoman for the British Columbia Division, came forward with a claim that she had been the victim of sexual harassment by senior officers as far back as 1991, when she graduated from the RCMP Academy.

=== Caroline O’Farrell abuse claim ===
In 2014, Staff Sgt. Caroline O’Farrell filed a lawsuit against thirteen colleagues in the musical ride alleging physical and sexual abuse.

=== Sexual harassment settlements ===
In October 2016, RCMP commissioner Bob Paulson apologized for what he referred to as "shameful conduct" by the organization. An internal investigation determined that up to 20,000 female officers and civilian employees since 1974 may have been victims of harassment, discrimination, and/or sexual abuse. Additionally, the organization has set aside a $100 million compensation fund for victims. They did not, however, address the matter of SSgt Caroline O’Farrell, who brought a separate suit due to her treatment while part of the Musical Ride in the late 1980s.

On July 8, 2019, the National Post announced that a $100 million settlement was reached in a class-action lawsuit against the RCMP for sexual harassment. The Federal Government of Canada and the RCMP have entered into a Settlement Agreement in the Tiller et al. v. Her Majesty the Queen (Federal Court File Number T-1673-17) to compensate qualified claimants who have been subjected to the gender or sexual orientation based discrimination and/or harassment. The previous similar 2017 Merlo and Davidson Class Action Settlement only compensated female members and a limited number of public servants. Compensation for proven claims over the 45-year period would range from $10,000 to $222,000 each.

The 2016 settlement for $100 million covered female officers who had been sexually harassed in the RCMP since September 1974. A second settlement in 2019 for $100 million was for women in non-policing roles at the RCMP. According to the CBC in 2019, around 2,500 women were expected to claim claims under both of the settlements. The payouts are only allowed for living officers, with payments denied to the families of Mounties who had committed suicide since coming forward about the harassment.

== Animal abuse ==
In 2017, allegations of animal abuse against horses used for the RCMP Musical Ride emerged. Following the allegations, the riding master conducting the musical rides, Mike Côté was removed from his post and restricted to administrative duties. This revived previous allegations going back as far as 2004 that the officer severely beat a horse until it was bleeding, punching another horse and ramming another into a wall. Other previous claims of public concerns were cited that he was promoted to a horse master.

== Kinder Morgan pipeline in Canada ==
During early stages of the construction of the Kinder Morgan pipeline, which drew large scale protests, the RCMP was brought in to disperse them. This resulted in a number of arrests. Amongst those arrested were Member of Parliament Elizabeth May and Tamo Campos, grandson of David Suzuki, which the activist made a speech against, and criticized the RCMP's actions.

Opponents of the Kinder Morgan pipeline alleged that the RCMP deliberately targeted them for arrests.

== Homophobia ==
On November 11, 2020 the Honourable Michel Bastarache, C.C. Q.C. Independent Assessor, released his report Broken Dreams Broken Lives. In it Bastarache wrote "What I learned led me to conclude that a toxic culture prevails in the RCMP. This culture encourages, or at least tolerates, misogynistic, racist and homophobic attitudes among many members of the RCMP."

== 2020 Nova Scotia attacks ==
On April 18 and 19, 2020, 51-year-old Gabriel Wortman committed multiple shootings and set fires at 16 locations in the Canadian province of Nova Scotia, killing 22 people, and injuring three others before he was shot and killed by the RCMP in the community of Enfield. The attacks are the deadliest shooting rampage in Canadian history, exceeding the 1989 École Polytechnique massacre in Montreal, where 14 women were killed.

The families of the victims, as well as the residents of Portapique, strongly condemned the RCMP's response to the attacks, as well as their transparency in the criminal investigation. Police were criticized for not using Alert Ready to warn the public about the unfolding attacks, as well as not responding to reports of Wortman's previous behaviour and acts of violence. An investigation into law enforcement's response to the rampage, including the decision not to use Alert Ready, was launched. A public inquiry into the law enforcement response was declared on July 28, 2020, following escalating criticism of the investigation's lack of transparency.

CBC News' television program The Fifth Estate and online newspaper Halifax Examiner analyzed the timeline of events, and both observed a myriad of failures and shortcomings in the RCMP response. A criminologist criticised the RCMP's response as "a mess" and called for an overhaul in how the agency responds to active shooter situations, citing its failure to properly respond to other such incidents in the past.

== See also ==
- Law enforcement in Canada
- Royal Commission of Inquiry into Certain Activities of the RCMP
- Corruption in Canada
- Human rights in Canada
- Royal Canadian Mounted Police
