= Quebec Royal Canadian Mounted Police =

RCMP federal policing in Quebec

Royal Canadian Mounted Police - "C" Division

Agency overview
- Formed: 1920
- Headquarters: Montréal (Québec); 45°30′N 73°34′W
- Motto: Maintiens le droit Defending the Law
- Employees: 1500
- Minister responsible: Dominic LeBlanc, Minister of Public Safety, Democratic Institutions and Intergovernmental Affairs
- Agency executive: François Deschênes, Assistant Commissioner - "C" Division Commanding Officer
- Parent department: Public Safety Canada
- Website: http://www.rcmp-grc.gc.ca/qc/index-eng.htm

The RCMP "C" Division is the Royal Canadian Mounted Police division responsible for federal policing in the province of Quebec. Approximately 1,500 police officers, civilian members, and public servants carry out a range of federal policing duties, including enforcing financial crime legislation, national and border security, combating organized crime, conducting investigations, providing VIP protective services, and undertaking crime prevention initiatives in communities throughout Quebec.

The role of the RCMP in Quebec is strictly to enforce federal statutes. The "C" Division differs from its RCMP counterparts in most Canadian provinces and from its policing partners in Quebec which operate under a community policing model. However, by combining resources and intelligence capabilities with its partners in Canada and abroad, the "C" Division is able to conduct interprovincial and international investigations.

== Structure ==
Its headquarters are located in Montreal with its detachments divided geographically into two districts: East & West.

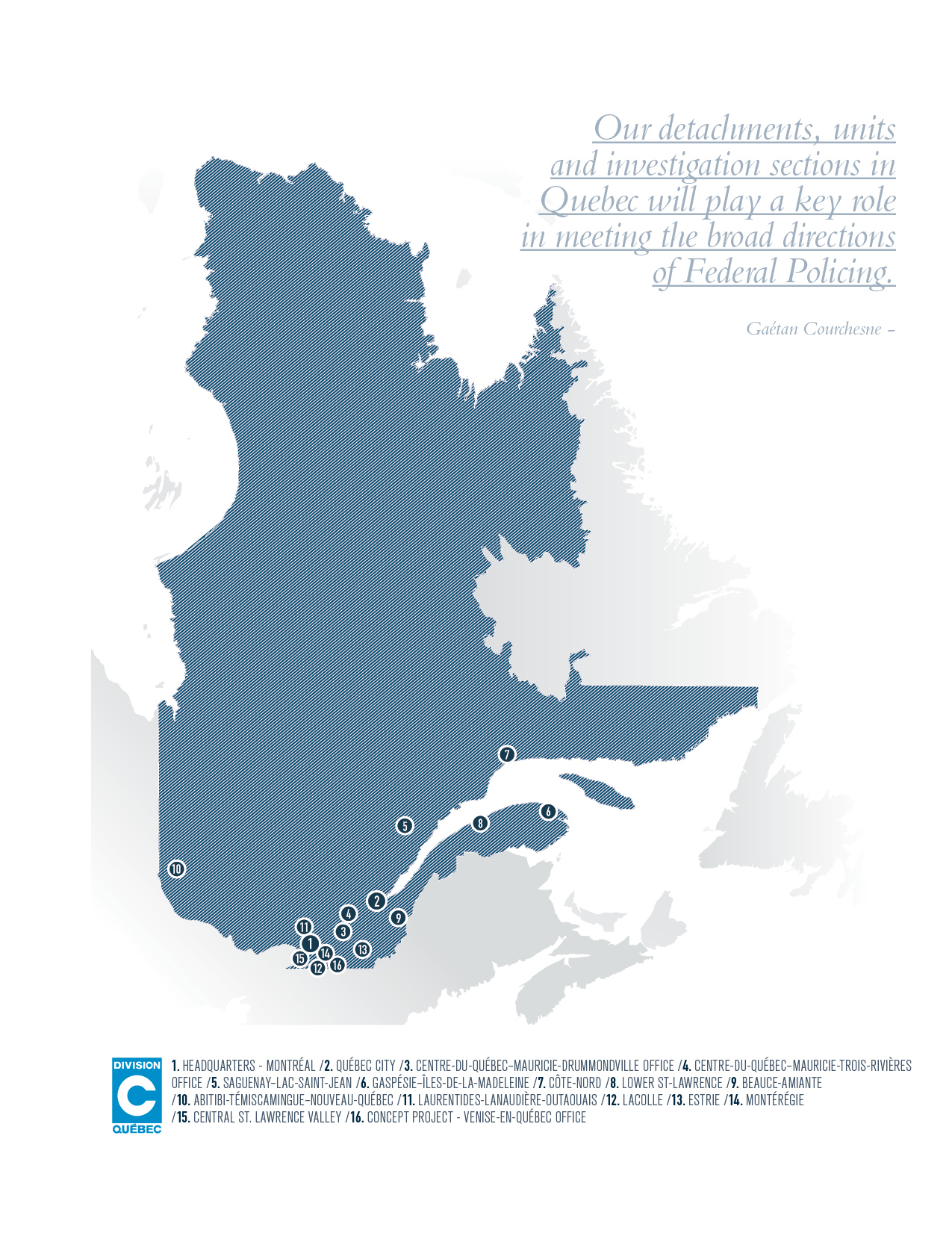
Map of "C" Division detachments

== History ==
The Northwest Mounted Police was established in 1873 to police the western plains. In 1920, it was renamed the Royal Canadian Mounted Police (RCMP). That same year, the Federal Government authorized the RCMP to establish its first detachment in Quebec, specifically in Montreal. Staffed by ten members, this office was inside a building at 283 Sherbrooke Street, located across from the main entrance of McGill University. The building was demolished in 1940. The officer commanding this detachment was Superintendent C.E. Wilcox, who was best known for his service in Western Canada. Later that year, the RCMP opened a one-man detachment in Quebec City, extending its presence to the province's two largest urban centres. Shortly after, the RCMP was stationed along the international border to collect customs duties and to stop illegal immigration into the country.

At the time, the "C" Division was tasked with the responsibility of enforcing some 40 federal statutes. Around 1921, the RCMP opened a few detachments near Indian reserves to maintain law and order and enforce the Indian Act, governing in particular the control and sale of alcoholic beverages.

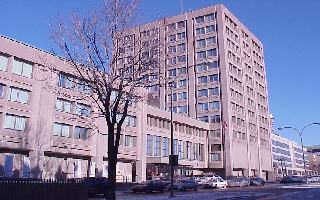
Montreal RCMP Headquarters today

Between 1920 and 1932, the RCMP considered the Province of Quebec as a simple district without alphabetical designation, whereas Eastern Ontario was designated as "A" Division and Western Ontario as "O" Division. Back then, the letter "C" was used to designate the Province of Manitoba, whose divisional post was located in Brandon. Detachment work consisted mainly of the application of Indian legislation, the Customs Act, and the Migratory Birds Convention Act, while drug and counterfeit currency enforcement was an important part of police work in Montreal.

In 1932, the RCMP absorbed the Customs and Excise Preventive Service. All 175 members and 35 vessels and crews that were once the responsibility of the Customs and Excise Preventive Service came under the direction of the RCMP. This created the RCMP Marine Service.

Operating with a limited complement of 33 members and four detachments in 1931, the RCMP then grew to a membership of 156 men and 31 detachments in Quebec. Given the additional duties brought about by the merger with the Customs and Excise Preventive Service, RCMP officers had to patrol the territory by land, sea, and air to fight against alcohol smuggling and other forms of contraband or to provide assistance to vessels in distress.

Due to the increased workforce, the RCMP restructured its district organization. The term "district"—used by the Force to designate its area of jurisdiction in the Province of Quebec, which was then under the command of Superintendent Dawn—was replaced by "C" Division.

=== Defining events of their role and history ===
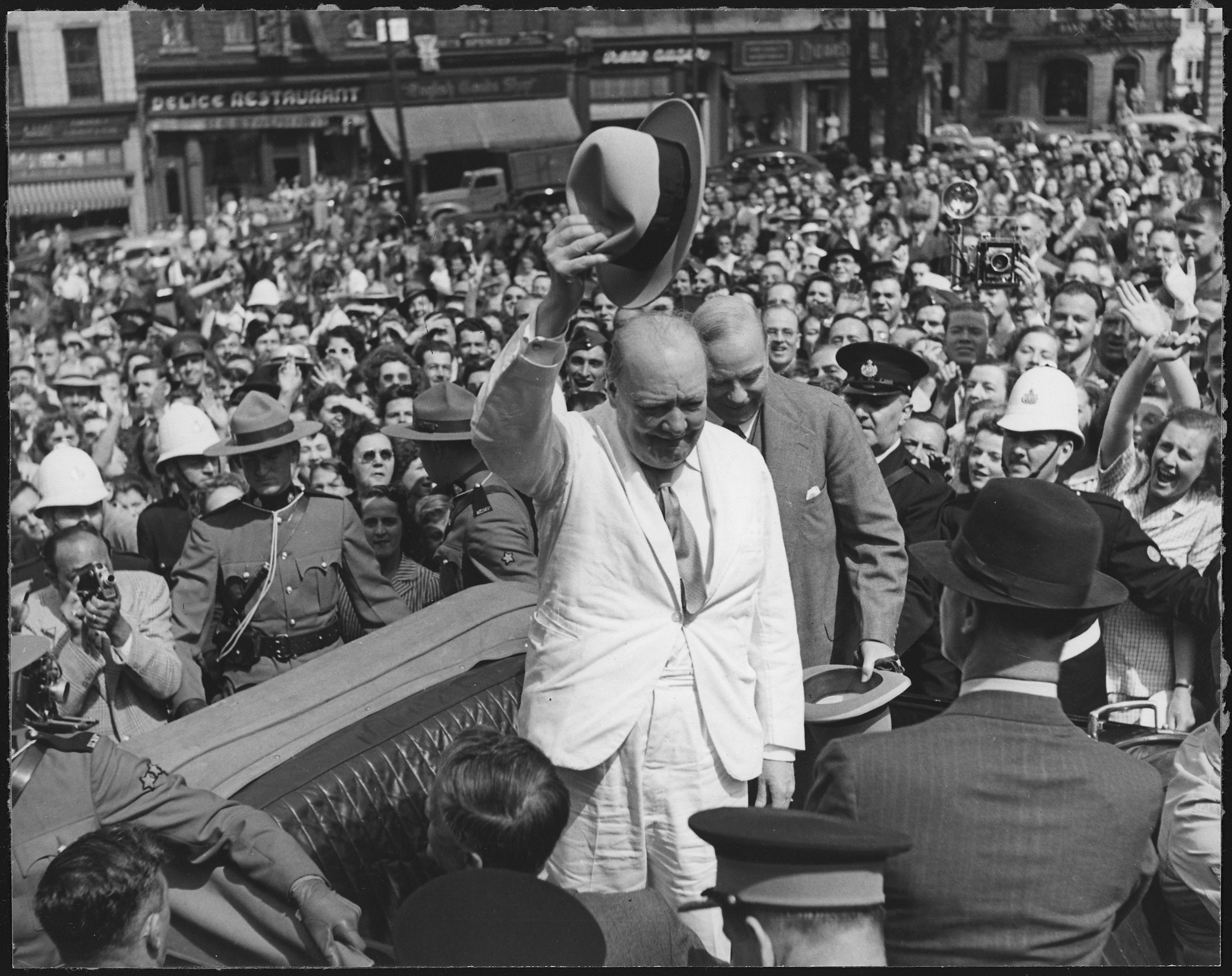
Churchill in Québec City

RCMP participation was required in numerous events of major importance that took place in the Province of Quebec. The responsibilities of the Force included protecting VIPs during visits to Canada and providing assistance to other police departments in the province during major events.

==== Visit of Winston Churchill and Franklin Roosevelt to Québec City in 1943 ====
In 1943, as the Second World War was taking place in Europe, US troops joined their Canadian and European allies on the front lines. Since 1939, the two heads of state had held five conferences to develop strategies to defeat the enemy's offensive. They chose Québec City for their sixth conference. From August 17 to 24 of 1943, US President Franklin Delano Roosevelt and British Prime Minister Winston Churchill met within the walls of this fortified town for the Québec Conference, hosted by Canadian Prime Minister William Lyon Mackenzie King. Along with high-ranking officers of their respective armies, they planned military operations that led to the Allied victory over Axis forces.

==== Visit of French General Charles de Gaulle to Québec City on July 12, 1944 ====
During his trip to America, a few weeks after the Allied landings in Normandy, General Charles de Gaulle visited Québec City and Montréal. Even though his stop in Montréal lasted only a few hours, he attended a formal reception held in his honour at the Windsor Hotel. Many dignitaries gathered for the occasion, including Quebec Premier Adélard Godbout.

==== Expo 67 and the visit of Charles de Gaulle ====
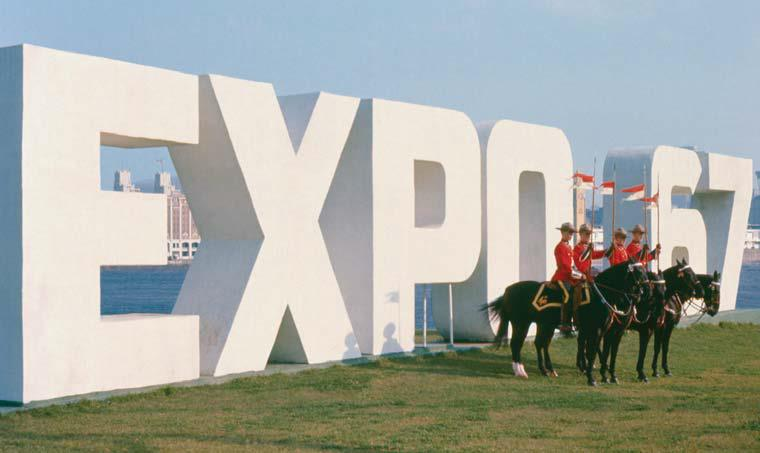
Mounties at Expo 67

With the opening of the Universal Exhibition in Montréal, Expo 67, Quebec received attention worldwide during the summer. The President of France, General Charles de Gaulle, made an official visit to Quebec on that occasion. From the balcony of Montréal City Hall, he said, "Vive le Québec libre!" [Long Live Free Quebec], drawing cheers from an ecstatic crowd.

==== 1970 October Crisis ====
The RCMP worked against the Front de libération du Québec (FLQ) in the 1960s and 1970s and was the target of a bombing attack by the group. The 1977–1981 McDonald Commission investigated illegal activities by the RCMP Security Service in Quebec in their efforts to counter the FLQ before and after the 1970 October Crisis. The Commission's recommendations resulted in a separation of policing and intelligence duties with the creation of the Canadian Security Intelligence Service and the replacement of the War Measures Act by the Emergencies Act in 1988.

==== 1976 Summer Olympic Games in Montréal ====
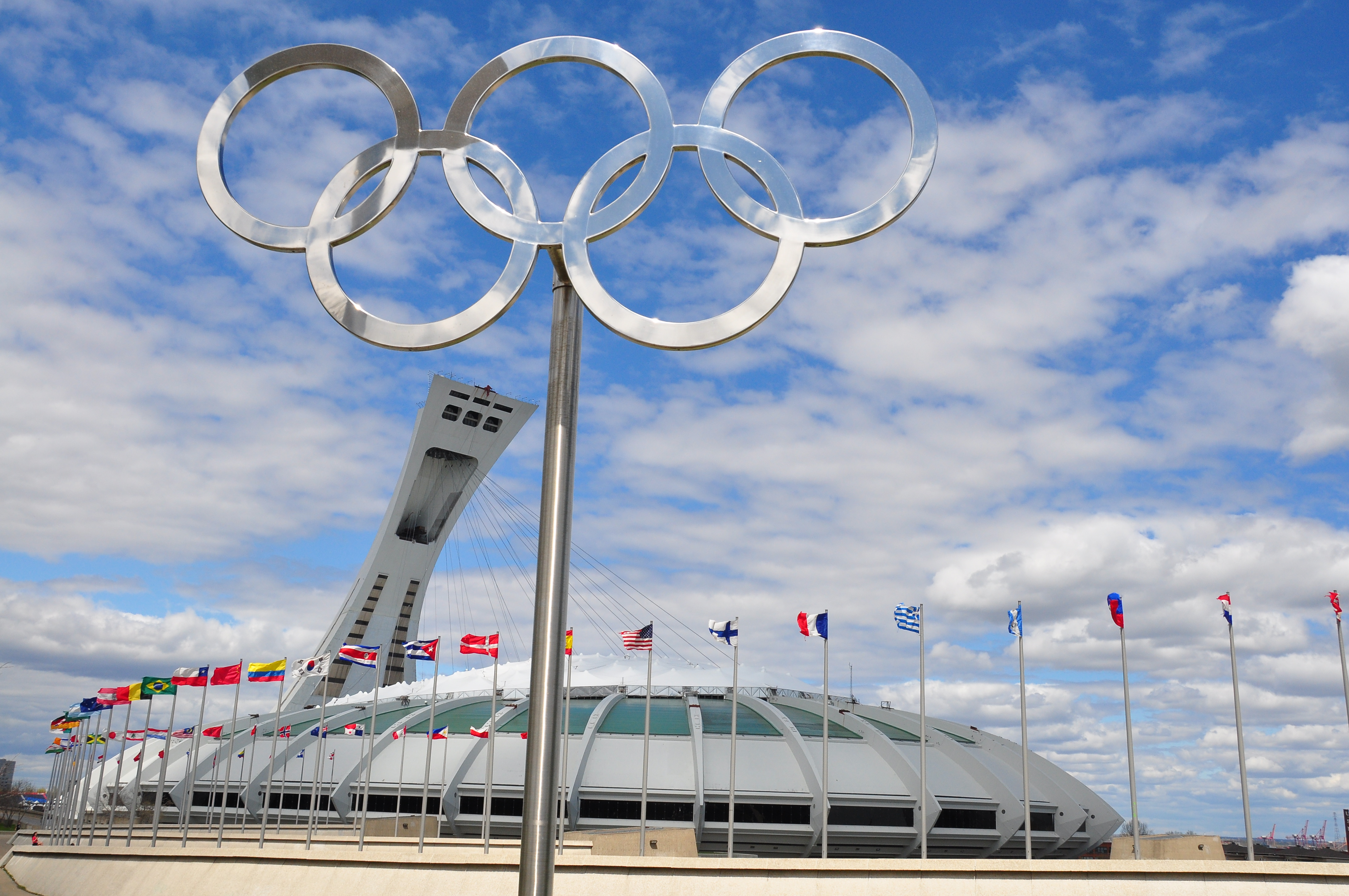
The Montreal Olympic Games

On July 17, 1976, viewers worldwide watched as the opening ceremonies of the 21st Olympic Games unfolded in Montréal. The world-renowned Olympic Stadium, Montréal's architectural landmark, was built for that occasion. The building features the Montreal Tower, which is the world's tallest inclined tower, standing at a height of 165 meters (appoximately 541 feet).

==== The 2001 Summit of the Americas in Québec City ====
From April 20 to 22, 2001, 34 democratically elected heads of state and government of North America, Central America, South America, and the Caribbean met in Québec City for the third Summit of the Americas. The meeting is well known for the security measures put in place for the event and for the numerous public demonstrations that were held as the meetings took place. The Québec Summit attracted more than 50,000 demonstrators from across the Americas, ranking it among the top alter-globalist protest events to this day. This international event, in which the RCMP played a key role, was marked by the largest security operation in Canadian history.

==== The 2008 Francophonie Summit in Québec City ====
In October 2008, the largest ceremonial event ever to be held in Canada took place in Québec City, as 70 heads of state attended the 12th Conference of Heads of State and Government of Countries Using French as a Common Language, commonly called the Francophonie Summit. This Summit provides world leaders who share the French language with an opportunity to discuss topics such as international policy, the environment, Francophone cooperation, human rights, education, culture, and democracy. The Summit is held every two years and is the highest authority in La Francophonie. Security for the Francophonie Summit, which was provided by the Royal Canadian Mounted Police, the Quebec City Police Service, and Sûreté du Québec, also required the collaboration of several federal, provincial, and municipal partners and agencies.

== RCMP services in Quebec ==
Although its primary focus is on the fight against major organized crime at the national and international levels, the RCMP has diverse responsibilities in Quebec. This section provides an overview of the duties performed by RCMP officers in the "C" Division.

=== Organized crime enforcement ===
Organized crime is one of five strategic priorities established by the RCMP. It is defined by the Criminal Code as a crime committed by any group of at least three people that has as one of its main purposes or activities the facilitation or commission of one or more serious offences where the primary motive is profit. Organized crime networks are an international problem that ignores national boundaries. This is why the RCMP advocates partnerships with the public and other Canadian and foreign law enforcement organizations to carry out its investigations.

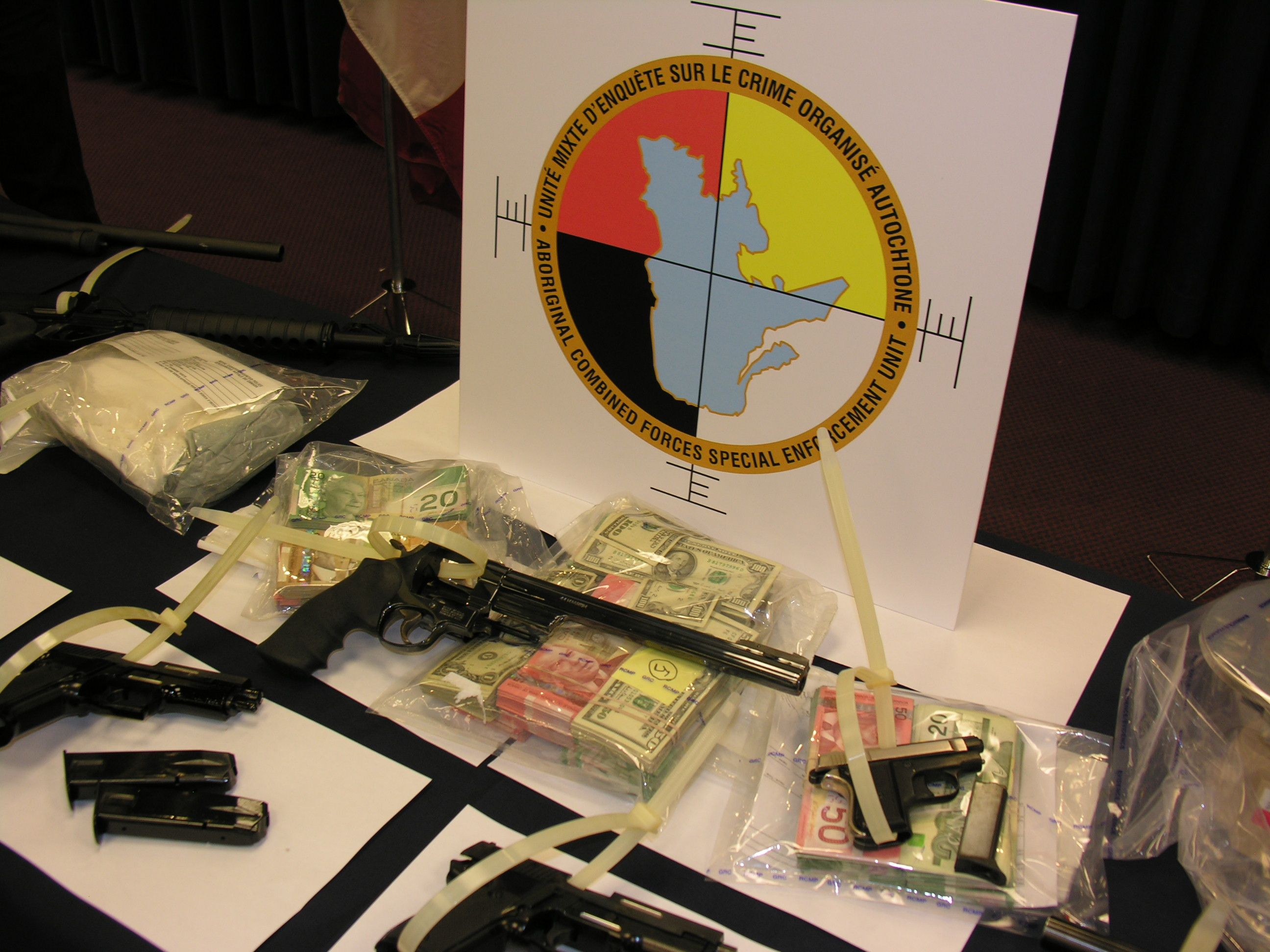
Seized dirty money and firearms

==== Integrated Proceeds of Crime Unit (IPOC) ====
IPOC investigators hit criminal organizations by targeting the proceeds of crime and the very motivation behind any criminal activity, i.e., profit, by seizing the assets purchased by criminal elements with proceeds of crime. IPOC investigators work in conjunction with other RCMP units and several outside agencies, police departments, foreign enforcement agencies, banks and professional corporations.

==== Combined Forces Special Enforcement Unit (CFSEU) ====
The Combined Forces Special Enforcement Unit (CFSEU) is tasked with investigating major crime in partnership with local, national, and international agencies in an effort to curtail the expansion and development of organized crime in Quebec.

==== Aboriginal Combined Forces Special Enforcement Unit (A-CFSEU) ====
Its goal is to investigate, pursue, and dismantle criminal organizations whose negative impact and intimidation methods pose a direct threat to the best interests and well-being of Quebec's Aboriginal communities.

=== Financial Integrity ===
Their role is to prevent what is known as “white collar crime”, where a person gains unauthorized access to large amounts of other people's money. They prevent these crimes under federal law and can be national or international in scope.

==== Federal Investigation Section ====
The strategic objective of the Federal Investigation Section program is to ensure the health and safety of communities, protect the public and maintain Canada's economic integrity. The primary mandate of the Federal Investigation Section is to enforce federal statutes and related regulations through a combination of proactive and reactive strategies. The proactive program combines prevention, education and enforcement measures partnered with affected client communities. Reactive investigations are initiated in response to requests for RCMP assistance received from other federal departments and agencies.

The Federal Investigation Section investigates criminal offences under federal statutes with the help of the appropriate federal department. Through the provisions of 18 Memoranda of Understanding, the Section also provides assistance to partner agencies as well as various federal agencies and stakeholders in conducting investigations under any one of some 250 federal statutes. The program is enforced through five sub-sections.

==== Integrated Technological Crime Unit (ITCU) ====
The Integrated Technological Crime Unit (ITCU) is composed of police investigators and civilian members and is responsible for investigating computer crimes of national or international scope and providing technical assistance to other investigative units. The ITCU investigates offences such as unauthorized access to a computer or computer network (computer intrusion or hacking), mischief in relation to data (theft, manipulation, deletion, etc.), and possession of equipment or passwords facilitating these offences. The mandate of the ITCU is four-fold: investigation, computer support, intelligence and prevention.

===== Investigation =====
The investigation's goals were to determine computer crimes where the federal government is the victim. To conduct and coordinate investigations of criminal or terrorist activities targeting Canada's national critical infrastructure from a technological perspective. To assist in joint national security investigations of technological significance.

In cases where the computer crime is as significant as the substantive offence, investigate jointly with the RCMP unit having primary jurisdiction for the substantive offence.

In cases where the RCMP does not have primary jurisdiction, conduct, with the consent of the police service having jurisdiction, national or international interest investigations of offences involving considerable financial loss or are extremely complex.

==== Commercial Crime Section ====
Commercial Crime Section members investigate, control and prevent what is known as "white collar crime", whether national or international in scope, through federal law enforcement. Their efforts are focused on the following areas: counterfeiting, bribery and corruption, fraudulent bankruptcy and major general fraud.

==== Integrated Market Enforcement Team (IMET) ====
The mandate of the Integrated Market Enforcement Team (IMET) is to investigate major cases of financial fraud involving large-cap companies for which allegations of fraud could significantly shake or undermine investor confidence in Canadian financial markets. Investigations deal with major financial crime offences, i.e. fraud, fraudulent manipulation of stock market operations, false financial statements, fraudulent bankruptcies, secret commissions, etc.

=== Border Integrity ===
The "C" Division Border Integrity Program contributes to the national security of Canada and protects Canadians from terrorism, organized crime and other border-related criminality, while allowing for the secure and effective international movement of people and goods. To achieve this goal, “C” Division works in close partnership with provincial, national and international government agencies as well as the community at large.

The various sections and teams contributing to ensure border security include:

Immigration and Passports Section

The members of Immigration and Passport Section focus their efforts on detecting and disrupting the main criminal activities relating to immigration, passport and citizenship: organized migrant smuggling, services provided by so-called immigration consultants, fraudulent corporate use of the immigration program, human trafficking, forgery of citizenship cards, visas, passports and other documents. The RCMP works in close partnership with Citizenship and Immigration Canada and Foreign Affairs.

Customs and Excise Section

The members of Customs and Excise Section fight all forms of smuggling activity involving national and international organized crime. Their investigations focus mainly on illicit alcohol, tobacco products, firearms and jewelry.

Integrated Border Enforcement Teams (IBET)

The Integrated Border Enforcement Teams work in close cooperation with their partners in Canada and the United States. The IBET mandate is to target criminal activity and to ensure national security at the border.

Coastal/Airport Watch Program

The Coastal/Airport Watch Program was established to assist in the identification of persons, vessels, vehicles and aircraft that may constitute a threat to Canada's national security, or that may be involved in illegal activity.

National Ports Enforcement Team (NPET)

The National Ports Strategy is part of the organization's overall mandate to ensure border integrity. In "C" Division, the investigators’ role consists in coordinating the collection of intelligence for the

Airport Federal Investigation Section (AFIS)

Members of the Airport Federal Investigation Section are responsible for fighting organized crime at the Montreal – Pierre Elliott Trudeau International Airport and for assisting airport partners and authorities and co-operating with them to ensure passenger safety.

Marine Security Enforcement Team (MSET)

This joint marine security initiative is led by the RCMP and the Canadian Coast Guard to further enhance national security and strengthen Canada's response to potential threats. It strengthens marine enforcement presence in a region heavily traveled by both small and large craft. It involves the deployment of vessels conducting joint security patrols on the Great Lakes and St. Lawrence waterway.

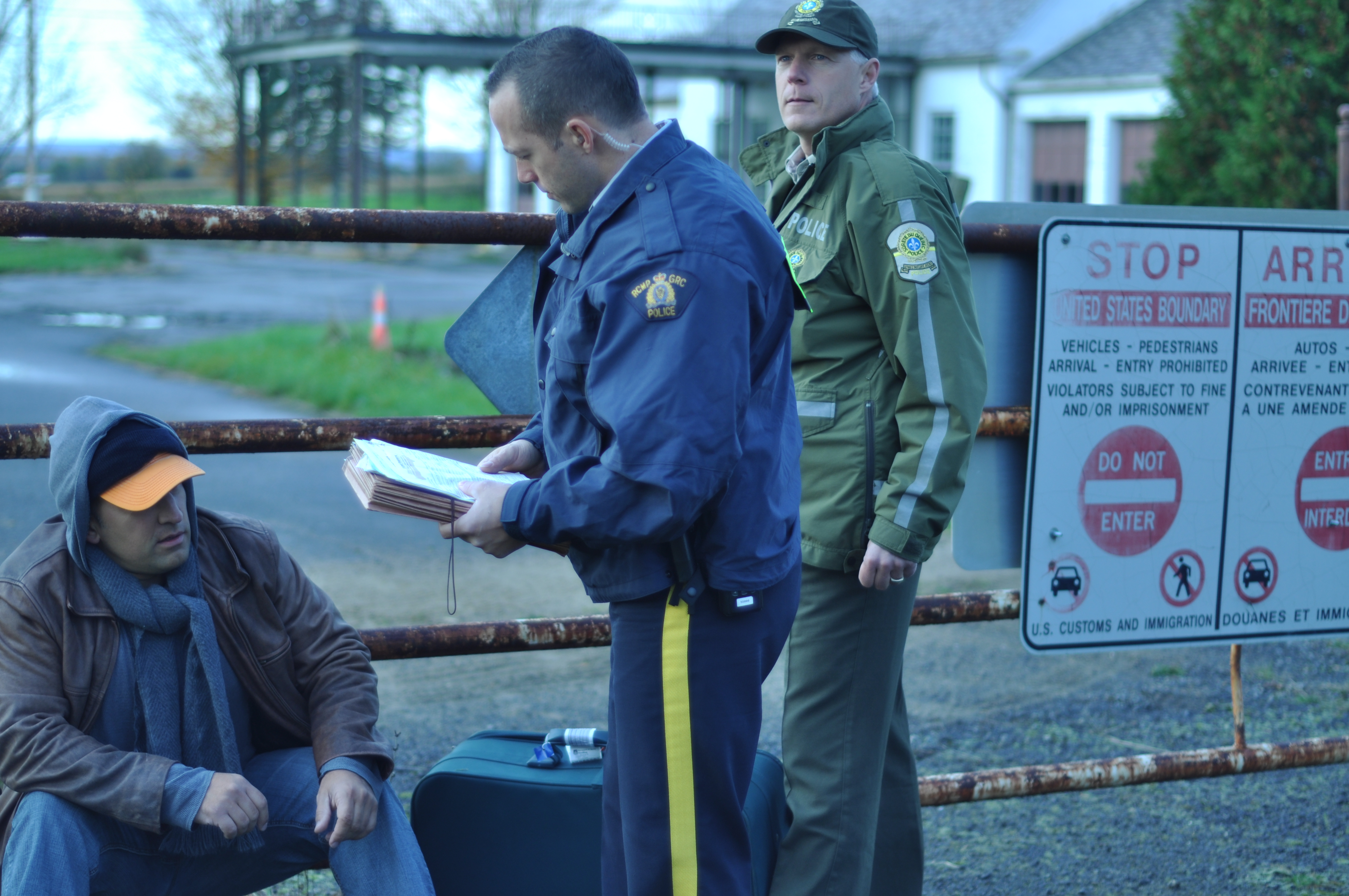
Illegal migrant arrested at the border

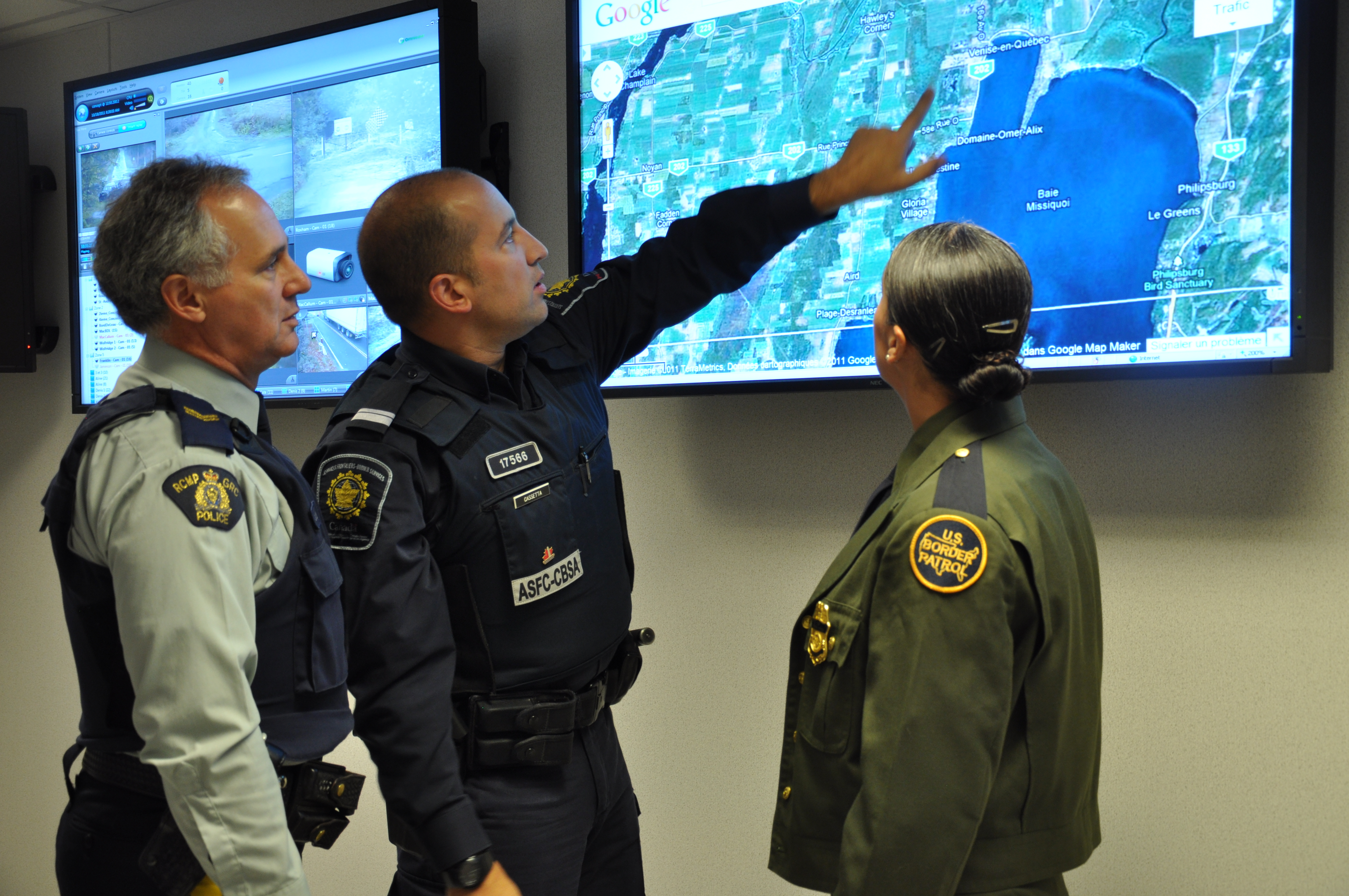
Border enforcement

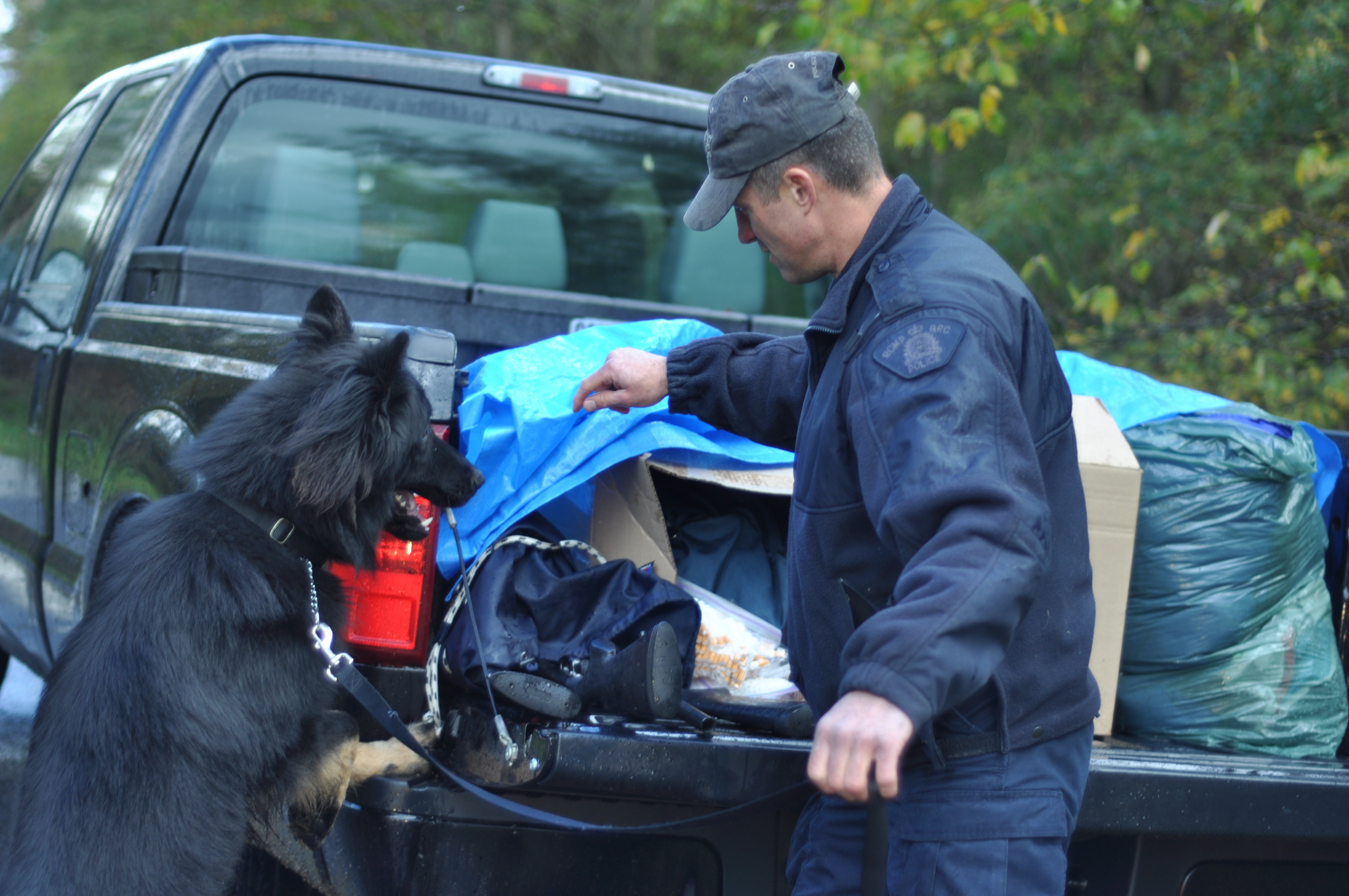
Customs and Excise Section detecting/stopping illegal tobacco products

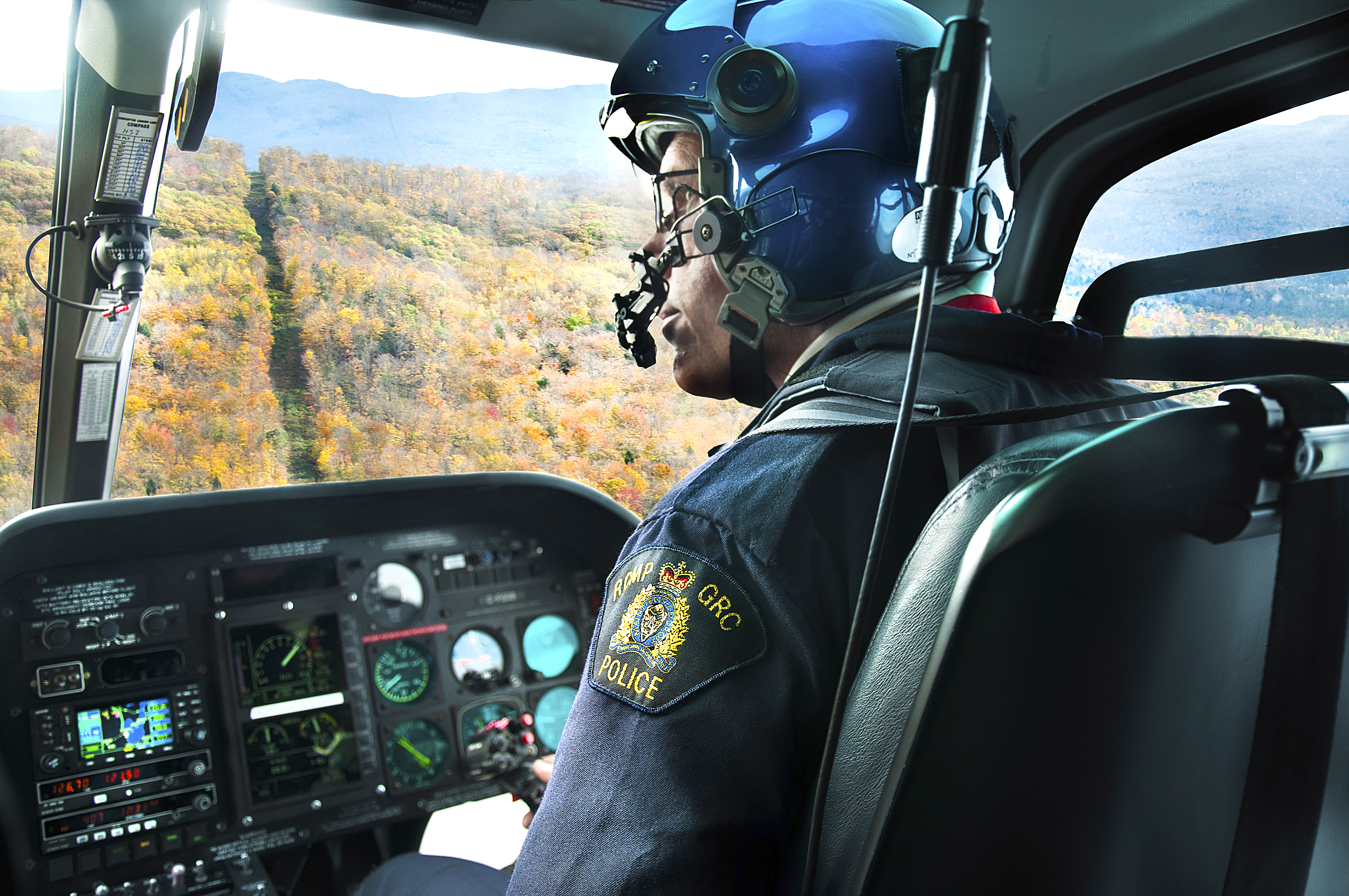
Air surveillance

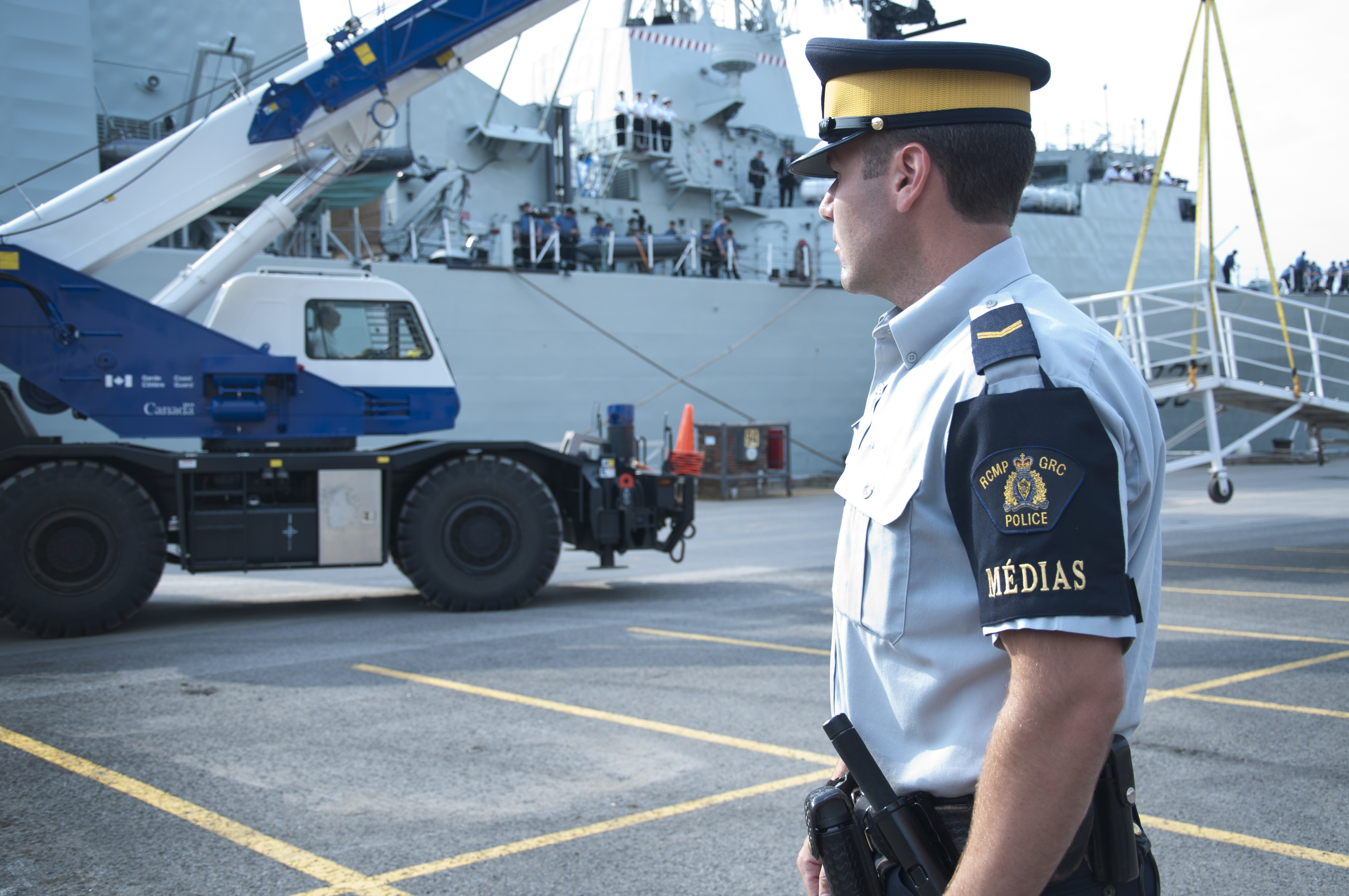
Port security

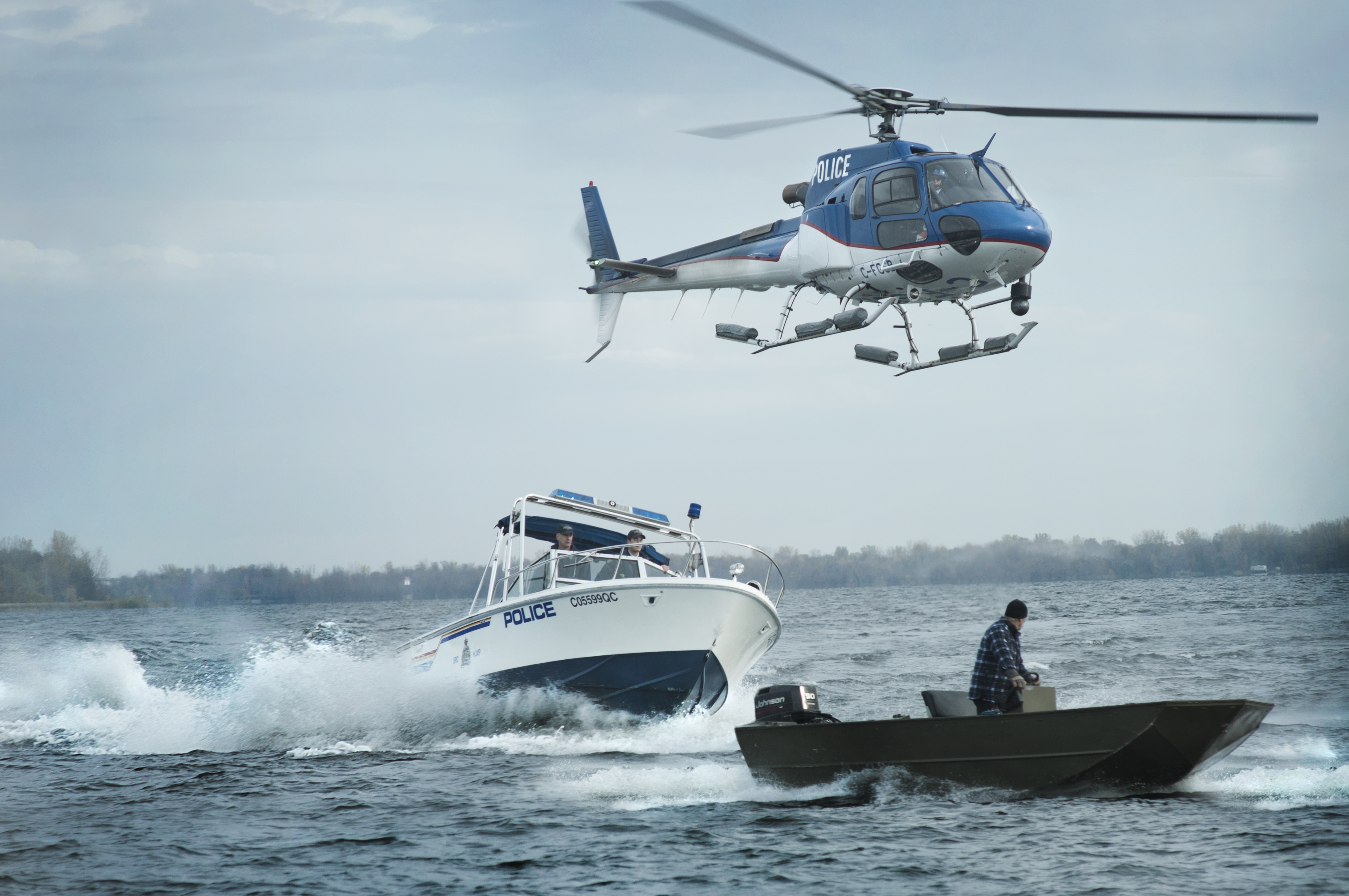
Marine safety

=== National security ===
==== Integrated National Security Enforcement Team (INSET) ====
Everywhere in its jurisdiction, the Integrated National Security Enforcement Team (INSET) is responsible for enforcing the laws relating to criminal activity that constitutes a direct or indirect threat to national security or interests, or that may interfere with the conduct of government business. Its scope includes espionage, sabotage, insurgency, treason, terrorism, extremism, offences committed against Canadian or foreign VIPs or diplomats, and offences committed for the purpose of supporting or funding individuals involved in the commission of such offences.

=== Criminal Intelligence ===
The Criminal Information Analytical Section is responsible for collecting and analyzing information on the criminal elements operating in the province. The Section offers direct intelligence support to all other RCMP sectors in Quebec, in addition to providing sound advice to management on the development of national and provincial crime control strategies.

=== Protective Services ===
The RCMP claims to be a leader in the delivery of protective services, a significant area of activity for federal police in Quebec that leaves no room for error. RCMP officers carry out high-risk duties while protecting VIPs and their spouses, including the Prime Minister of Canada and the Governor General, foreign heads of state and dignitaries visiting Quebec.

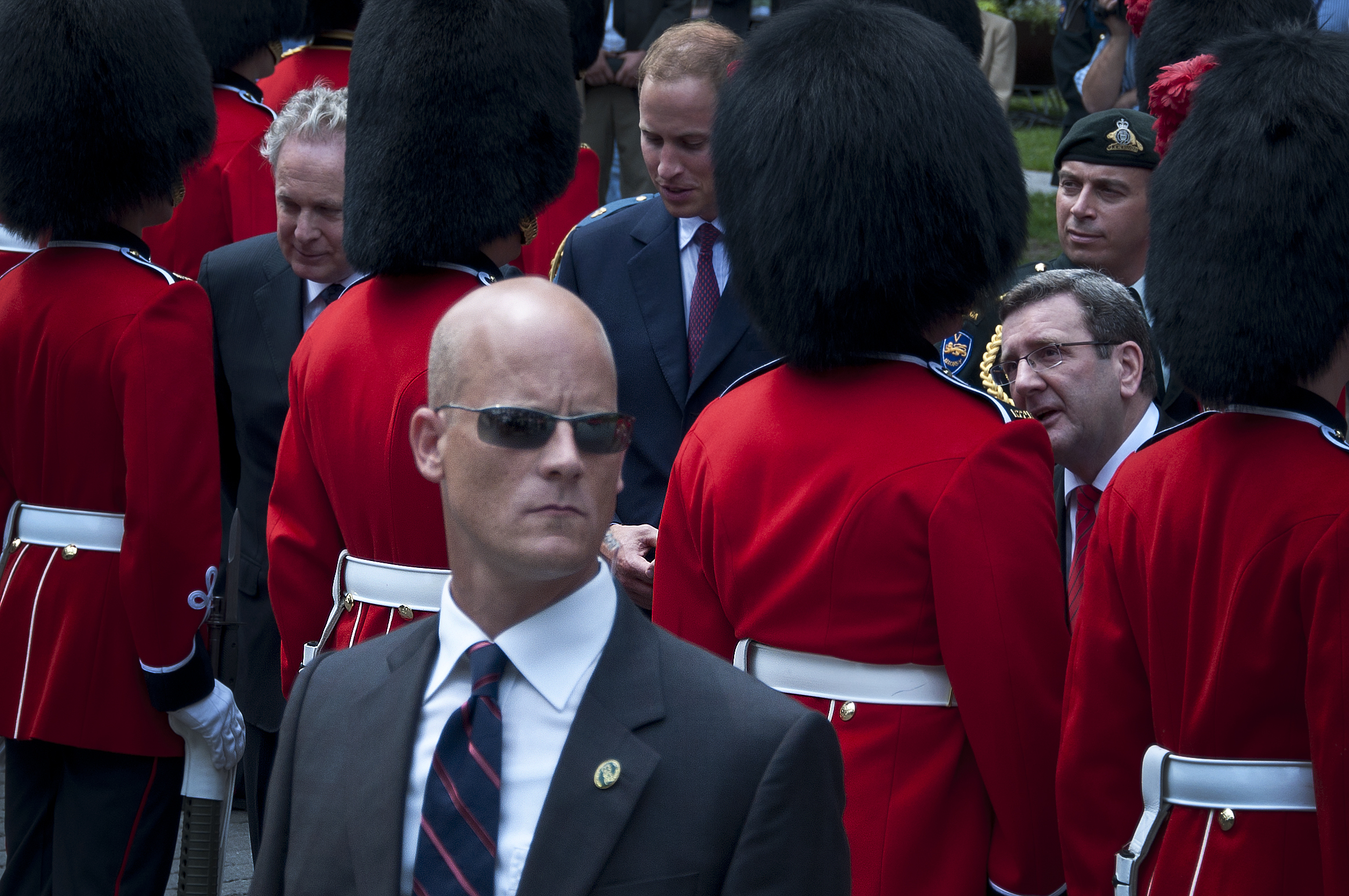
VIPSS member on duty during the visit of Prince William, who appears in this picture with Quebec Premier Jean Charest and Québec City Mayor Régis Labeaume

The second mandate of VIPSS relates to Internationally Protected Persons (IPPs), as defined in the Criminal Code, who must be provided with varying levels of protection while in Canada. Consequently, VIPSS provide physical protection to foreign heads of state, ambassadors and consuls visiting Quebec.

VIPSS also provide personal protection to the Prime Minister of Canada, the Governor General, two former Prime Ministers as well as the leaders of Canadian political parties during federal elections. Members of VIPSS carry out the following duties:

- Bodyguard
- Motorcade driver
- Site security
- House of Commons security
- Aircraft protective services

== Overview of major investigations over the past 15 years ==
The history of the RCMP is marked with numerous major investigations of national and international scope. Below is an overview of some of the investigations that have made the RCMP in Quebec famous.

=== Project Colisée ===
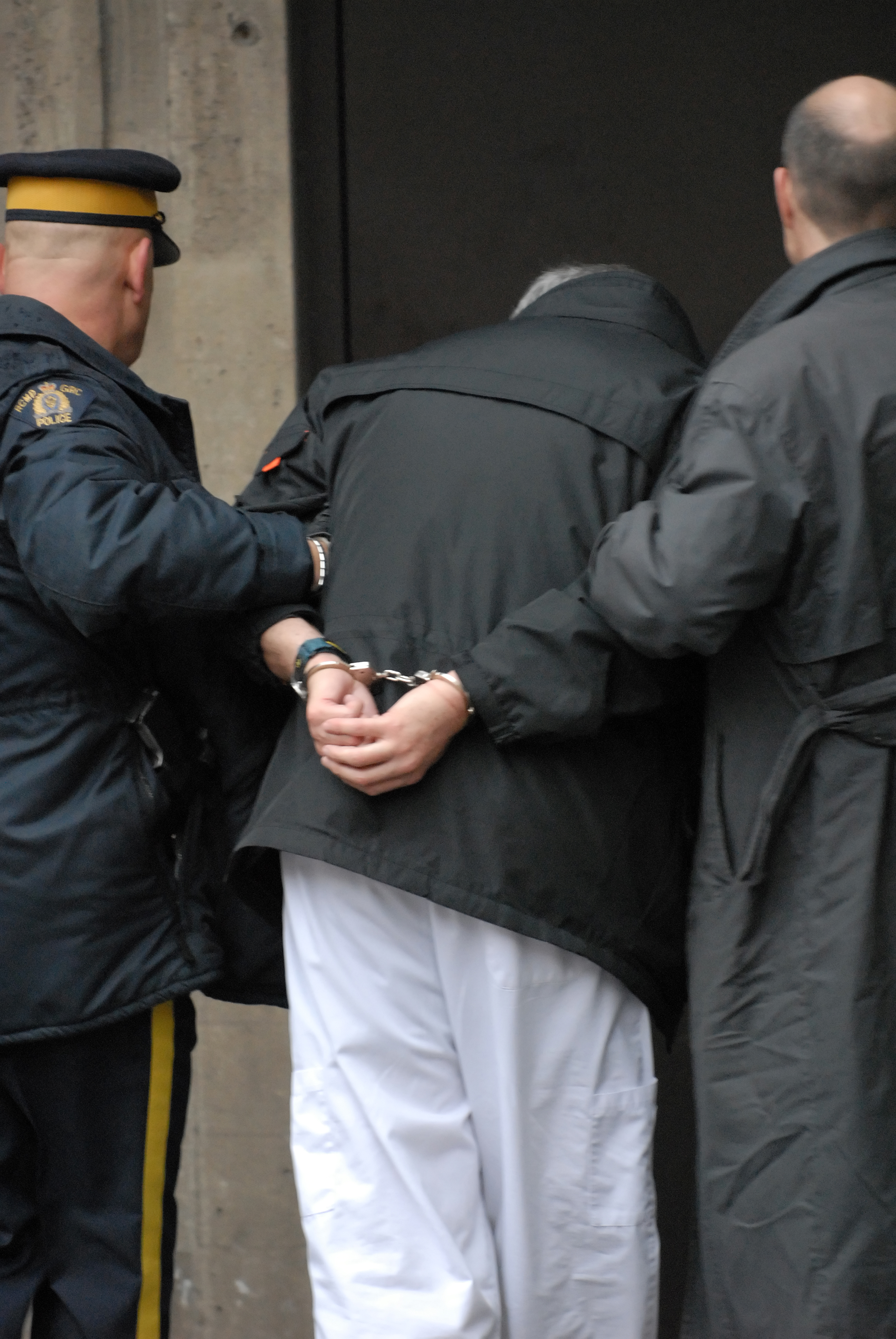
RCMP escorting an arrested individual.

Project Colisée, the most expensive RCMP investigation costing $35 million, and the largest raid against the Italian Mafia in Canadian history, took place on the morning of November 22, 2006 by 700 police officers, after lasting four years. The partners of the Combined Forces Special Enforcement Unit dealt a serious blow to traditional organized crime by conducting numerous searches on that day in the Montreal region. Among the 90 people arrested were Nicolo Rizzuto, Paolo Renda, Rocco Sollecito, Francesco Arcadi, Lorenzo Giordano and Francesco Del Balso; over 1,000 charges of crimes committed between 2003 and 2006 were laid, including racketeering, conspiracy to traffic drugs, extortion, illegal bookmaking, possession of illegal cash and goods, corruption of civil servants and tax evasion. During the investigation, the RCMP penetrated the group's inner sanctum by hiding cameras in the Consenza Social Club where the leaders had business. On 191 occasions, the police cameras recorded the group's leaders counting cash and dividing it among themselves. Almost everyone arrested pleaded guilty. Project Colisée collected more than a million hours of wiretap evidence, and a total of $4 million was seized in the raid.

Project Colisée was a wide-ranging investigation aimed at curbing the growth and development of organized crime in Canada. Project Colisée was led by the Combined Forces Special Enforcement Unit (CFSEU), a joint unit coordinated by the Royal Canadian Mounted Police (RCMP) and also involving the Sûreté du Québec, the Montréal City Police Service (SPVM), Service de protection des citoyens de Laval, Canada Border Services Agency (CBSA), and Canada Revenue Agency.

Through Project Colisée, CFSEU investigators were able to infiltrate the criminal organization and to take it by surprise in various ways by identifying and arresting the leaders of the organization, by uncovering conspiracies to import cocaine via the Montréal Trudeau Airport. In 2005, a 300 kilogram shipment of a total 1,300 kilograms of cocaine, co-organized by Rizzuto confidante, Francesco Del Balso and West End Gang member, Richard Griffin, was intercepted in Boucherville, Quebec by police. Online bookmaking and sports betting businesses run by the Rizzutos, were allegedly estimated to generate over $26 million over a period of 18 months.

On September 18, 2008, as a result of the investigation, the committee six members of the family pleaded guilty to possession of proceeds of a crime for the benefit of, the direction of, or in association with a criminal organization.

=== Project Celsius ===
On April 18, 2012, a police operation conducted by the RCMP resulted in the arrest of nine suspects in connection with the importation of a series of hashish shipments totalling 43.3 metric tonnes. This international police operation was conducted with the collaboration of law enforcement authorities in Pakistan, Italy, Belgium and the United States.

This investigation, dubbed Project CELSIUS, was initiated in the summer of 2010 by the Montréal RCMP Drug Section jointly with the RCMP National Ports Enforcement Teams in Montréal and Halifax. It serves as an example of the firm commitment made by the RCMP to fight domestic criminal organizations with international ramifications that infiltrate legitimate businesses in our country in order to engage in criminal activity, thus compromising the safety of our communities.

The investigation was initiated after the Canada Border Services Agency (CBSA) found drugs in offshore containers at the ports of Montréal and Halifax in 2009 and 2010.

This investigation shows that the criminal organization involved purchased drugs from Asia, primarily originating in Afghanistan and transported via Pakistan. The hashish was hidden in containers that were shipped by boat and transited through several ports before being routed to Canada. Some of the suspicious containers were seized in Pakistan, while others were intercepted en route to Canada, specifically in Italy and Belgium.

=== Project Chabanel ===
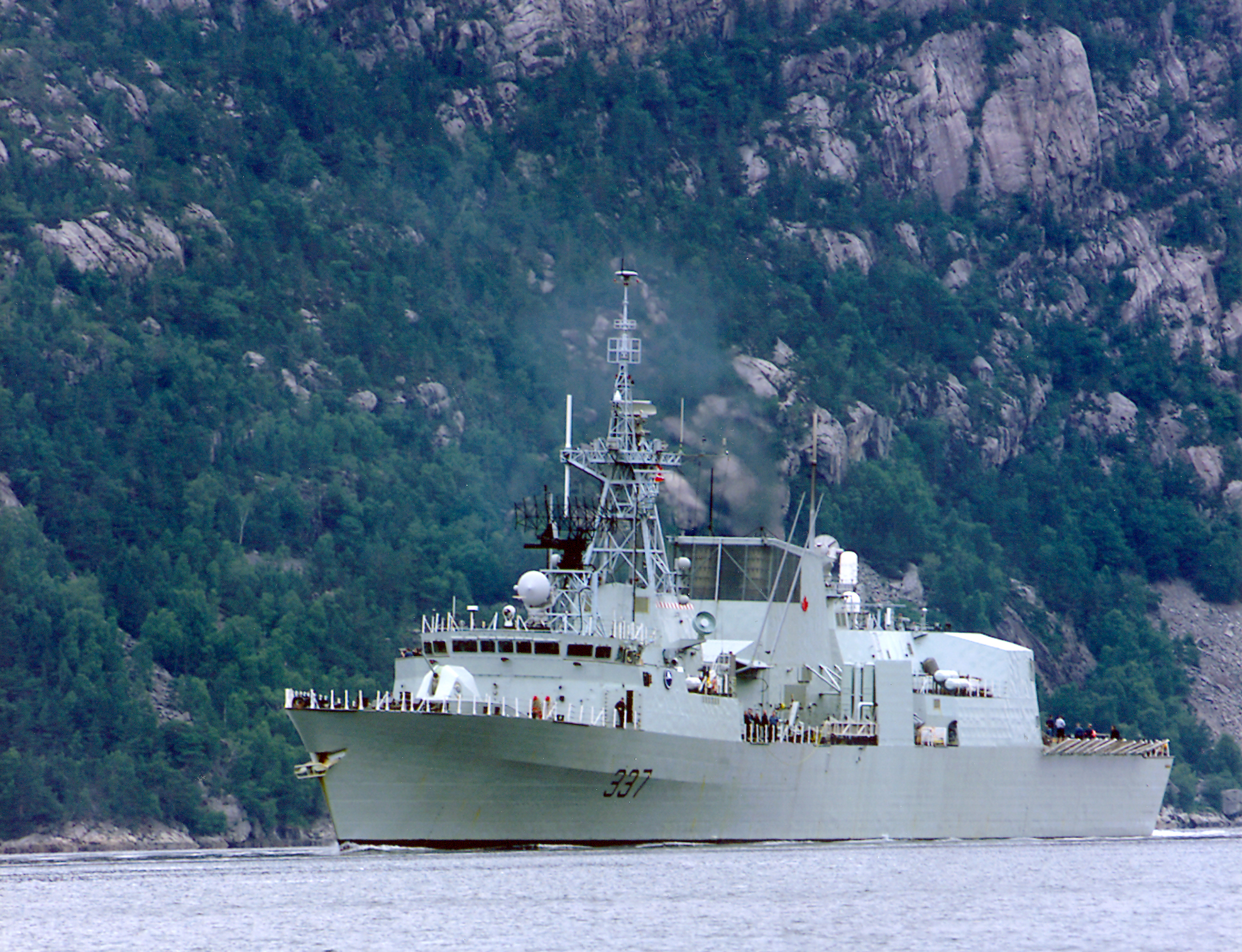
The vessel used by the RCMP during Project Chabanel

On 10 May 2006, the Royal Canadian Mounted Police conducted the Project "Chabanel" police operation, seizing a 22.5-ton shipment of hashish from suppliers off the shores of Africa intended for the Canadian market. Three conspirators linked to the West End Gang criminal organization were arrested, resulting in the elimination of an "import" cell of the Montreal-based criminal organization.

This operation was carried out in close cooperation with Canada's Department of National Defence and RCMP liaison officers in England, Morocco, Pakistan, the United Arab Emirates and Spain. For more than a year and a half, the investigators of Montreal and Halifax RCMP Drug Sections worked out the details of this international police operation.

The investigation was launched on the basis of information that a subject linked to the West End Gang was involved in a major hashish importation conspiracy from Africa. The organization first had to find a crew and ship suitable for deep-water navigation and for transporting the drugs.

Project “Chabanel” was therefore initiated by the RCMP. A vessel was chartered to travel to a predetermined location approximately 200 miles off the coast of Angola in Southern Africa. The drugs were transferred from the supply vessel, whose crew was primarily made up of Filipino sailors, to the RCMP chartered vessel. The RCMP complement spent more than 43 days at sea in order to seize the 22.5 tons of hashish and thus prevent its distribution to communities in Canada.

HMCS Fredericton, a Department of National Defence frigate, followed the RCMP vessel at a distance and provided necessary assistance throughout the journey, ensuring the safety of the police officers and serving as command post.

Once transhipment was completed to the RCMP vessel, the drugs were brought into Canada and taken to Montreal under heavy police escort. The drug shipment was to be delivered to the West End Gang on June 2, 2006. The RCMP then used the seized drug shipment in a sting operation order to arrest three people associated with the gang. They were subsequently charged with drug importation, possession for the purpose of trafficking and drug trafficking.

"C" Division of the Royal Canadian Mounted Police, which is responsible for the enforcement of federal statutes in Quebec and southeastern Ontario subsequently received the IACP/ChoicePoint Award for Excellence in Criminal Investigations that was awarded to its Montreal Drug Section by the International Association of Chiefs of Police for the operation. The RCMP shared this award with the Department of National Defence.

=== Project Compote ===
In 1990, the RCMP Integrated Proceeds of Crime Unit conducted an investigation, dubbed Project Compote, in which the police opened its own phony currency exchange office, the Centre international monétaire de Montréal, for the purpose of arresting drug traffickers using this exchange office to launder drug money. All employees in that office were in fact RCMP officers who had been trained beforehand by the National Bank of Canada to act as professional tellers. This police investigation ended in late August 1994 with a total of 46 people arrested, including Sabatino Nicolucci and a Rizzuto crime family lawyer, Joseph Lagana. $160 million, including $140 million from criminals, were intercepted through this storefront operation.

=== Project Cléopâtre ===
In June 2006, more than 350 police officers took part in a large-scale operation to dismantle a criminal organization specializing in the trafficking and exportation of marijuana and ecstasy to the United States, as well as money laundering. A total of 42 searches were conducted in the Estrie and Montreal regions, leading to the arrest of 36 people, including the alleged leader of the ring, a resident of Kanesetake.

The "Project CLÉOPÂTRE" investigation was carried out by the Aboriginal Combined Forces Special Enforcement Unit (A-CFSEU). 125 charges were laid against the arrested and included criminal organization offences, drug trafficking, conspiracy to traffic in drugs, money laundering, and possession of prohibited weapons.

As a result of the international police operation, the A-CFSEU was awarded on October 16, 2006, the prestigious Motorola Webber Seavey Award for Quality in Law Enforcement at the IACP Annual Conference in Boston. The award recognizes innovative policing programs that can serve as models for law enforcement agencies worldwide.

=== The Norbourg case ===
On June 18, 2008, Montréal RCMP confirmed the conclusion of its investigation into criminal wrongdoings that affected approximately 9,200 shareholders of mutual funds managed by Norbourg. This criminal investigation showed that six persons allegedly participated in or facilitated the commission of fraud offences for a total of approximately 95 million dollars. This investigation conducted by the Integrated Market Enforcement Team (IMET) led to the arrest of six persons with close ties to Norbourg, including Norbourg CEO Vincent Lacroix.

The six suspects were charged with conspiracy to commit fraud, conspiracy to commit forgery, forgery, fraud and money laundering. The crimes for which the suspects were charged were allegedly committed between September 20, 2002, and August 25, 2005. A total of 922 counts of indictment were laid as a result of this IMET criminal investigation.

This investigation was a strategic priority intended not only to establish the alleged wrongdoings, but also to prove the criminal intent of the perpetrators. It was launched on the basis of a search of Norbourgs business premises carried out on August 25, 2005. The search led to the seizure and analysis of approximately 1,500 boxes containing more than one million miscellaneous documents and millions of computer files. The criminal investigation focused on the analysis of 137 illegal withdrawals between 2002 and 2005.

== Commitment to communities and employees ==
In addition to conducting investigations, RCMP members also strive to attend a variety of community and multicultural events. The commitment of "C" Division to regional events includes various educational initiatives, charitable activities and national/international conferences.

=== Healthy Enterprise – Elite Certification ===
In 2012, the RCMP was awarded the Healthy Enterprise – Elite certification by the Bureau de normalisation du Québec (BNQ). Through this certification, the BNQ acknowledged the commitment made by “C” Division to take concrete action to better the health and wellness of its employees.). The RCMP is the first federal agency and the first police force in Canada to be awarded this certification. The BNQ praised the RCMP for the quality of its infrastructure, including fitness facilities in almost all of its detachments, and for taking steps to promote healthy living among its employees.

The RCMP is now part of a group of only 14 businesses and organizations in Quebec boasting the Healthy Enterprise – Elite certification.

== International Peace Operations ==
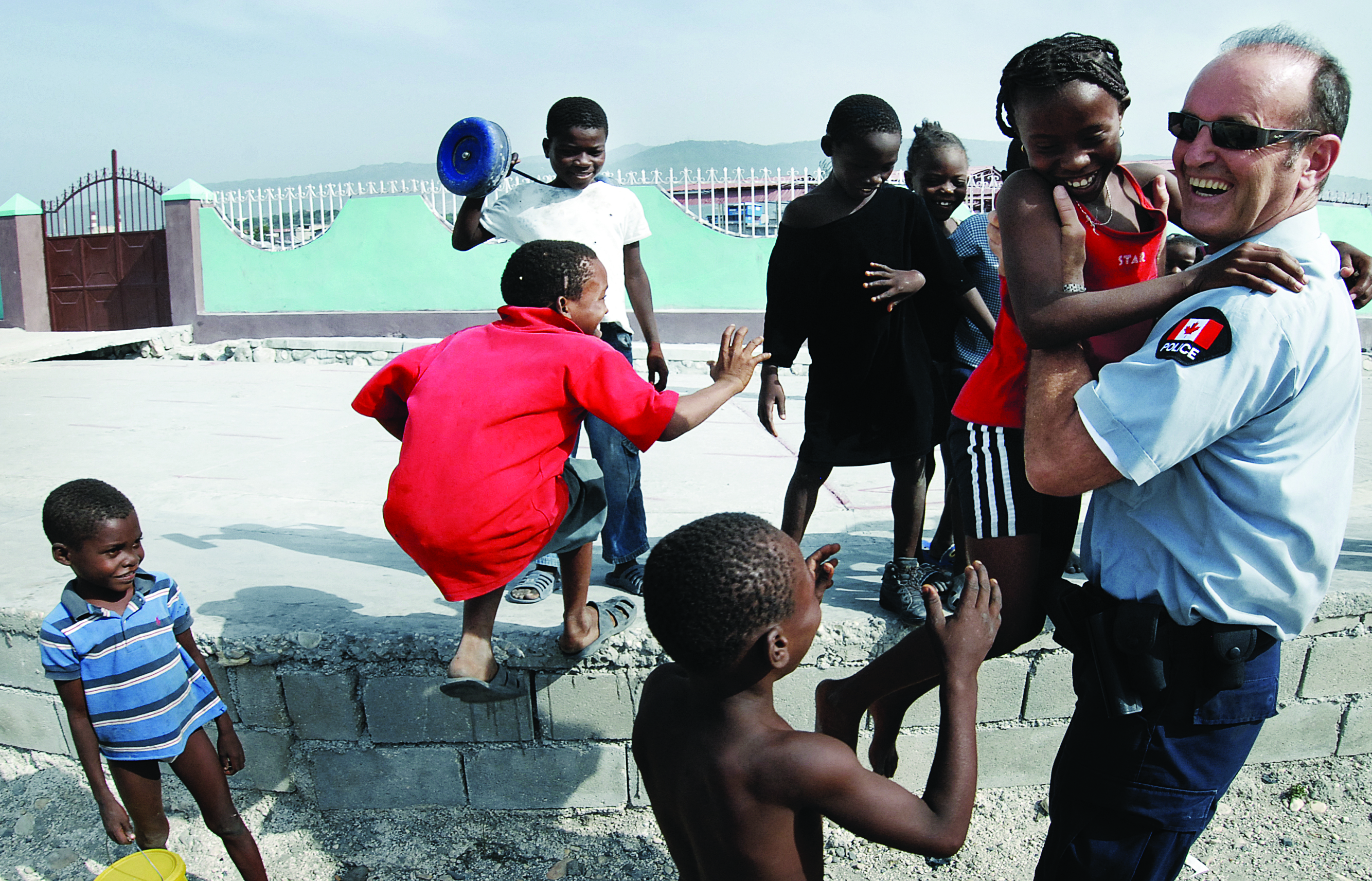
RCMP officer in Haiti

Since 1989, Canada has deployed police officers to international peace missions around the world. They assist in rebuilding and strengthening police services in countries that have experienced conflict or upheaval.

The RCMP manages the deployment of Canadian police, including planning and evaluating missions, selecting and training personnel from across the country as well as providing support throughout deployment.

Canadian police who serve abroad come from municipal, provincial and regional police forces as well as the RCMP, and represent a variety of backgrounds.

== Public relations tools ==
=== Ceremonial Troop ===
Created in 1988, the RCMP Ceremonial Troop is composed of volunteers posted to various sections in "C" Division.

Troop members visit homes for the elderly and children's hospitals, help collect funds on behalf of non-profit organizations, and represent Canada in a variety of public events at home and abroad.

=== Pipes and Drums ===
The "C" Division Pipes & Drums Band is based at the Royal Canadian Mounted Police Headquarters in Montréal and serves communities in the region.

The Band is composed of police and civilian volunteers.

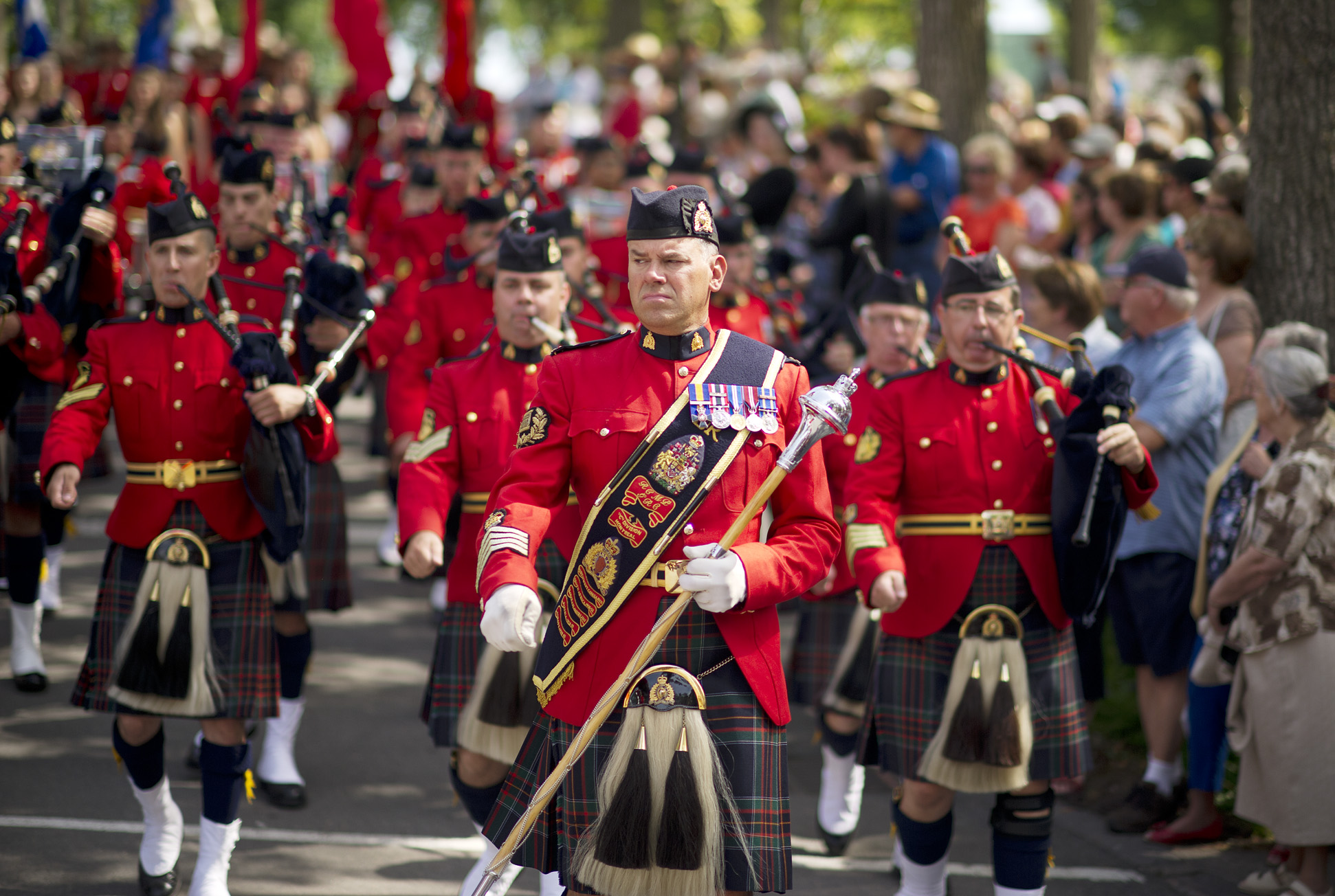
The Pipes and Drums Band marching in a parade

The Band performs for the public and in support of regional and local community events, including charity fund raisers, sports and cultural ceremonies, fairs, festivals, parades, memorial services and ceremonial functions on behalf of the Royal Canadian Mounted Police and other organizations.

The performances are adapted to specific occasions requiring:

- A parade band
- A show band
- Small ensembles
- A solo piper
