= RCMP harassment policy =

Policy regarding harassment within the Royal Canadian Mounted Police

In recent years, there has been growing criticism of the level of harassment occurring within the Royal Canadian Mounted Police (RCMP) and how harassment complaints are handled internally. The Government of Canada has acknowledged that the RCMP has a "crises in governance, culture and public accountability" that needs to be addressed. In 2014, the RCMP responded to the multitude of reports published by taking into account some of the recommendations for improvement in their current RCMP internal harassment complaint policy outlined in the Royal Canadian Mounted Police Act. The RCMP is one of "Canada's most iconic national institutions" however, the current harassment policy has still been deemed insufficient.

== Harassment in the workplace ==
The Canadian Human Rights Commission defines harassment as "a form of discrimination. It includes any unwanted physical or verbal behaviour that offends or humiliates you. Generally, harassment is a behaviour that persists over time. Serious one-time incidents can also sometimes be considered harassment."

The Treasury Board Policy on Harassment Prevention and Resolution expands on this definition, defining harassment as:

"Improper conduct by an individual, that is directed at and offensive to another individual in the workplace, including at any event or any location related to work, and that the individual knew or ought reasonably to have known would cause offence or harm. It comprises any objectionable act(s), comment(s) or display(s) that demean, belittle, or cause personal humiliation or embarrassment, and any act of intimidation or threat."

Using data from the 2016 General Social Survey (GSS) on Canadians at Work and Home, Statistics Canada finds that 19% of women and 13% of men experienced harassment in the workplace in the past year of at least one type (verbal abuse, humiliating behaviour, threats, physical violence, and unwanted sexual attention or sexual harassment), with verbal abuse being most commonly experienced. For every type reported, the proportion of women reporting was larger than the proportion of men.

The 2014 Workplace Bullying Institute (WBI) U.S. Workplace Bullying Survey found that 61% of people who are bullied at work lose their job, and 74% lose their particular job (i.e. 13% of those bullied move to a different job or location but remain with the same employer). WBI also found that only 15% of perpetrators lost their job.

Workplace harassment has serious physical and mental health and financial consequences for the individual being harassed. If employees leave their job, this increases recruitment and training costs for companies and may place harassed individuals in an economically unstable position. It has been found that harassment increases employee's use of their benefits programs and sick leaves, and reduces their productivity, significantly impacting employers.

== Civilian Review and Complaints Commission (CRCC) ==
Created in 1988, the Civilian Review and Complaints Commission (originally known as the Commission for Public Complaints against the RCMP) is an independent, impartial body that receives complaints from the public and reviews the handling of complaints when the complainant is dissatisfied with the RCMP's review process. On average, the CRCC receives approximately 2,000 public complaints per year. The Commission helps to uphold various laws and legislations including:

- Enhancing Royal Canadian Mounted Police Accountability Act
- Royal Canadian Mounted Police Act
- Witness Protection Program Act

== Public recognition of harassment ==
In June 2001, the Treasury Board amended its Policy on the Prevention and Resolution of Harassment in the Workplace. In a statement by Odette Lalumière, Senior Counsel for the Canadian Judicial Counsel, spoke specifically to the RCMP's handling of internal harassment policy complaints, stating that their policy must comply with Treasury Board policy. Lalumière continues to say that “the Committee recently reminded the Force of this obligation in case G-251” in January–March 2001.

=== Task Force on Governance and Cultural Change: The "Brown Report" ===
In 2007, the Government of Canada established a Task Force to address the "crises in governance, culture and public accountability" within the RCMP. The report, presented to the Minister of Public Safety and the President of the Treasury Board, investigated these concerns including: human resource capacity; training for current and future persons in positions of authority; processing of complaints on all matters, and the "culture of policing" which they identify "one of fear and intimidation" by persons in positions of authority. The report makes 49 recommendations for structural change.

=== Public Interest Investigation Report Into Issues of Workplace Harassment ===
In November 2011, Ian McPhail, the former Interim Chair of the Commission for Public Complaints against the RCMP (now known as Civilian Review and Complaints Commission) made an official complaint and declared the initiation of a public interest investigation regarding the process in which allegations of harassment within RCMP workplaces are handled.

The Commission stated it will examine:

- Whether those RCMP members notified of allegations of harassment adhered to the appropriate legislation, policies, procedures and guidelines in respect of workplace harassment;
- Whether RCMP members conducting investigations into allegations of workplace harassment did so in a thorough and impartial manner; and
- Whether existing RCMP policies, procedures and guidelines are adequate to ensure that allegations regarding RCMP members engaged in workplace harassment are dealt with fairly, effectively and thoroughly.

In February 2013, the Report, Public Interest Investigation Report Into Issues of Workplace Harassment within the RCMP, was published. The Report examined 718 workplace harassment complaints against the RCMP from 2005–2001. The key findings from the report reveal that 90% of complaints could “readily be classified” as abuse of authority (e.g. bullying, psychological abuse, and belittling and demeaning behaviour), and that 386 (56%) were repeated incidents of “perceived harassment.” Additionally, 4% of all complaints reported sexual harassment.

==== Civilian Review and Complaints Commission Recommendations ====
Based on the findings of the Report, the Commission made eleven recommendations in total, which address five areas that require improvement:

- Independence of the process
- The definition of harassment
- Required standards for harassment investigations
- Training and prevention
- Evaluation

Commission's Recommendations
| Recommendation No. 1 | That the RCMP implement a systematically compiled and nationally comparable system of data collection and reporting in respect of workplace conflict. |
| Recommendation No. 2 | That the RCMP institute centralized monitoring and coordination of the harassment complaint process, located at RCMP headquarters and reported directly to a senior executive outside the divisional chains of command. |
| Recommendation No. 3 | That the centralized coordination function also be responsible for receiving complaints of retaliation, the procedure for which should be clearly delineated in the applicable policy. |
| Recommendation No. 4 | That an external mechanism for review of harassment decisions be implemented. |
| Recommendation No. 5 | That the RCMP's policy regarding fostering a respectful workplace be defined as equally applicable to precursors of harassment, such as workplace conflict, in order that its dispute resolution mechanisms may be accessed at an early stage. |
| Recommendation No. 6 | That harassment investigators receive mandatory specialized training in respect of conducting investigations into workplace conflict and/or harassment prior to being tasked with such investigations. |
| Recommendation No. 7 | That the RCMP develop clearly defined investigative standards specifically in respect of investigations into harassment and workplace conflict. |
| Recommendation No. 8 | That the RCMP implement timelines for the treatment of harassment complaints, including for efforts at early resolution. |
| Recommendation No. 9 | That all supervisors and managers, upon appointment, be required to complete a relevant training program addressing workplace conflict and harassment within a set time of assuming their responsibilities. |
| Recommendation No.10 | That the online training module, which should address workplace conflict, including harassment, be delivered on a regular basis. |
| Recommendation No.11 | That the RCMP develop a comprehensive method of evaluation to ensure that changes are producing the desired effects, and that the results of such evaluation be regularly and publicly reported. |

== Current harassment policy ==
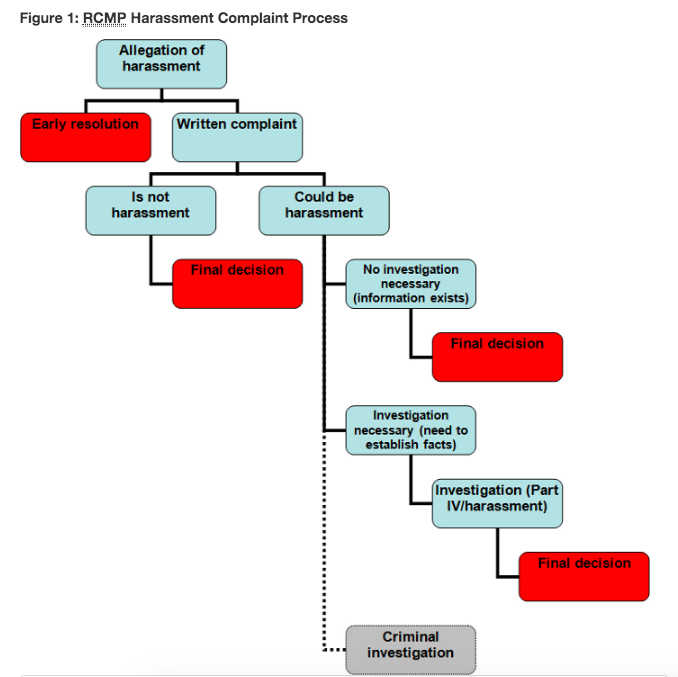
An overview of the internal RCMP harassment complaint process, as of January 1, 2019.

In reaction to the CRCC's 2013 Report, the RCMP reformed its Royal Canadian Mounted Police Act in 2014, and introduced new disciplinary processes for those who do not act in accordance with the Code of Conduct. The policies have been described as "zero tolerance," however there remain many critiques by the CRCC, specifically that these specific policies make it even more difficult to report and results in too many complaints being deemed "unfounded."

=== Internal process for addressing complaints ===
Since 2014, the internal process for addressing complaints of harassment within the RCMP follows a review system as follows:

(a) If an allegation of harassment is made and there is an early resolution (e.g. through mediation), this is the end of the process.

(b) If a written complaint is made, it is referred to a Human Resources Officer who decides if there is sufficient evidence to warrant a final decision or if there needs to be a further investigation. The Human Resources Officer makes recommendations to the Responsible Officer (the Responsible Officer is typically a police officer from the same Division as the complainants) who makes the ultimate final decision regarding the complaint.

(c) If the Human Resources Officer recommends a criminal investigation, they will inform the Responsible Officer who will initiate a Code of Conduct investigation pursuant to Part IV of the RCMP Act.

== Lawsuits & settlements ==
In 2015, four RCMP officers (Alice Fox, Catherine Galliford, Susan Gastaldo and Atoya Montague) who were in the midst of civil lawsuits against the RCMP for alleged harassment wrote to the Prime Minister, Justin Trudeau, and the Liberal Members of Parliament and Senators. The letter asked these figures for support in ensuring the women were not discharged from the RCMP before their civil legal proceedings were concluded.

The letter spurred the Review of four cases of civil litigation against the RCMP on Workplace Harassment, also known as the Fraser Report so named after the primary author of the Report, Sheila Fraser. The Report, written to the Minister of Public Safety and Emergency Preparedness (Honourable Ralph Goodale, P.C., M.P.), found that the process of civil litigation regarding alleged workplace harassment in the RCMP places unfair burden on the complainant, particularly in financial and emotional costs. Fraser reports that these costs are "an indication of the failure of the RCMP to effectively deal with their cases."

=== Female policing class action ===
These four cases resulted in a significant win for current and former female RCMP employees who had experienced harassment within the workplace.

On October 6, 2016, the then RCMP Commissioner, Bob Paulson, officially apologized and offer $100 million in compensation for harassment and sexual abuse against female officers and employees in the RCMP, affecting more than 3,100 officers who claimed these offences occurred on the job.

=== Female non-policing class action ===
In 2019, a class action lawsuit was formed on the grounds of alleged gender and sexual orientation-based discrimination and harassment within the RCMP.

While the RCMP has not admitted liability, they have settled with compensation of $10,000 - $220,000 for public-identified females who experienced harassment (including sexual harassment, physical assault, bullying based on gender or sexual orientation, sexual assault, and intimidation or abuse based on gender or sexual orientation) from September 16, 1974 (the first year women were welcomed into the RCMP) to July 5, 2019 by RCMP personnel. This is the second $100 million settlement in 3 years.

Eligible class members include publicly-identified females that “worked or volunteer in an RCMP controlled workplace supervised or managed by the RCMP” including but not limited to: public service employees, commissionaires, volunteers, contractors, and municipal or regional district employees.
