= Ian Bush =

Canadian police victim (1983–2005)

Ian Bush (July 23, 1983 – October 29, 2005) was a Canadian who was killed while in police custody. Significant ongoing controversy has been generated by the case. Ian Bush was a young man living in Houston, B.C. who was shot in the back of the head and killed by Royal Canadian Mounted Police Constable Paul Koester, after being arrested outside a hockey game. Many members of the community believe there were several flaws in the investigation, that there may have been a cover-up and conspiracy to protect Cst Koester. A full inquiry was held by the Commission for Public Complaints against the RCMP.

== Incident ==
The circumstances leading up to the shooting were that Cst Koester, a rookie with less than six months service, was on patrol outside the Houston hockey arena on the evening of October 29, 2005. Houston, British Columbia, is a small community of approximately 3,000 in Northern B.C. Koester, with other police officers, was assigned to patrol around the arena looking for drinkers who then returned inside, intoxicated. Koester approached Bush in the parking lot consuming a bottle of beer with a group of friends. Koester emptied the bottle and gave a warning to Bush. Koester then continued his patrol and upon returning to the area were Bush was, he noticed Bush with another open bottle of beer and decided to give Bush a ticket for having open liquor in public.

When asked for his name, Bush gave a false name. Koester cautioned him about lying about his name and that he could be charged with obstruction but Bush lied again to avoid being fined and Koester arrested him. As another officer approached, he identified who Bush actually was.

== Arrest and death ==
Koester searched Bush after the arrest but did not find his identification in his wallet, nor a bottle of beer Bush had hidden on him. Koester took Bush to the police station to issue him a Promise to Appear and release him from custody. There were no other police officers in the police station at the time. Koester and Bush were inside an interviewing room equipped with CCTV recording cameras, however Koester chose not to turn the cameras on, which was a normal thing not to do at the detachment. (Note: The CPC recommended that the RCMP install automated CCTV recording equipment in every RCMP detachment in areas where prisoners are dealt with and released; Houston has now done so.)

Inside the police station, Koester claims he and Bush got into a scuffle. Koester said that Bush was angry about being charged and said words to the effect of "Why don't I just punch you in the fucking face!" Koester claimed that a fight started and he could not radio for help. Koester reports that Bush was winning the fight and began strangling him from behind. Koester drew his gun, reached behind his head, struck Bush with the gun three times in the back of the head, and then shot Bush once in the back of the head. Bush died instantly. Photographs of Koester after the incident show extensive bruising and cuts to his left eye and forehead. The bullet was lodged above his eyebrows.

== Controversy ==
Constable Koester's actions surrounding the Bush death have been cleared through a police Criminal Code investigation, an inquiry by the Commission for Complaints Against the RCMP, and a B.C. Coroner's Act Inquiry conducted by Coroner Shane DeMeyer.

Ian Bush's mother Linda later launched a lawsuit against the RCMP.

A second inquiry by the Commission for Complaints Against the RCMP concluded in 2007 that the police internal investigation into the shooting was adequate and timely and that the officer was justified in using lethal force.

After the report was released, Ms. Bush said she disagreed with the commission's conclusion. A support website for Ian Bush was later set up to give another side to the picture.

Geoff Berner references the incident in his song "Daloy Polizei" from the album Victory Party.

== Findings ==
It was found that Bush died due to a single gunshot wound to the back of the head, while Koester and Bush were alone in the interrogation room. and Koester claiming that he was being choked from behind to unconsciousness and acting in self-defence. An investigation was conducted by an RCMP team brought in from another region, and that investigation was reviewed by several external agencies.

Conflicting evidence was given at the coroner's inquest. The analyses of the blood splatter evidence by an RCMP forensics officer, Jim Hignell, and Edmonton police constable, Joseph Slemko, differed, the former supporting Koester's account, the latter stating that Koester's account of events was impossible given the angle of the blood splatter. However, the Commission for Public Complaints against the RCMP ruled that Slemko "[has] gone beyond his area of expertise" and Hignell's evidence was accepted as preferred.

Furthermore, Constable Koester's actions surrounding the death of Ian Bush have been cleared through a police Criminal Code investigation, an inquiry by the Commission for Complaints Against the RCMP, and a B.C. Coroner's Act Inquiry conducted by Coroner Shane DeMeyer.

== See also ==
- List of controversies involving the Royal Canadian Mounted Police
- Darren Varley
- Fred Quilt
- Killing of Robert Dziekański
