= Sabatino Nicolucci =

Italian-American mobster

Sabatino "Sammy" Nicolucci (Italian: [sabaˈtiːno nikoˈluttʃi]; born 1946/47) is an Italian-Canadian mobster linked to the Sicilian Rizzuto crime family based in Montreal, Quebec, Canada.

== Links with the Rizzutos and sentencing ==
Nicolucci's first criminal conviction in Canada came in 1973 for drug possession, followed by possessing $2 million of counterfeit money in 1978. Nicolucci became a confidante of Vito Rizzuto, who went on a trip to Venezuela in 1984 where they met the allied Cuntrera-Caruana Mafia clan, regarded as drug specialists. That same year, a probe into Nicolucci's drug trafficking by the Royal Canadian Mounted Police (RCMP) found 12 kilograms of cocaine at Vancouver International Airport in false bottom suitcases intended for pick up by Montreal associate William Papier. The RCMP kept close surveillance on Nicolucci and Papier in Montreal through wiretaps, and even followed them by plane to Caracas, Venezuela where they received help from the United States Embassy in Venezuela, and bugged the mobsters hotel rooms. In 1985, the RCMP amassed enough evidence on Nicolucci and Papier, and the two were convicted and sentenced to 14 years in prison in Montreal Superior Court in relation to the Vancouver haul; they appealed, but the verdict was upheld.

== Release, kidnapping and another sentencing ==
In 1991, serving less than half his sentence, Nicolucci was released on parole. Within months of Nicolucci's release, he was money laundering, moving $31 million through a phony currency exchange in Montreal secretly run by the RCMP in an elaborate sting operation, called Project Compote. Officers traced a $1.7-million purchase of 280 kilograms of cocaine made by Nicolucci on behalf of Vito Rizzuto. However, Nicolucci refused to pay the debt to the Colombian Cali cartel, claiming the cocaine was of poor quality. As a result, the Colombians kidnapped Nicolucci from Castel Tina on August 2, 1994, a Montreal strip club he managed, and smuggled him across the border to Miami, Florida, and then into Colombia. With an international warrant for Nicolucci's arrest, the Colombian police found Nicolucci in a house in Cali, Colombia in February 1995. He was extradited back to Canada and brought back to Montreal on May 30, 1996. Nicolucci was found guilty of 437 charges for drug trafficking and money laundering, and sentenced to 19 years in prison.

== Later years ==
Nicolucci was paroled on Statutory Release in 2012. In September 2017, the Parole Board of Canada forbid Nicolucci from Montreal's Little Italy, as well as "Italian-style" coffee shops or establishments that are recognized by the police as being a meeting point for members of Italian organized crime."
