= Killing of Darren Varley =

Darren Varley (1973–1999) was a man from Alberta, Canada who died after a scuffle with police in a jail cell in Alberta after he was arrested for drunkenness.

== Background ==
Born in Pincher Creek, Alberta, Varley was a truck driver who lived in Pincher Creek his entire life.

== Arrest ==
On October 2, 1999, he had just finished a long day at work and headed to a local pub where he was to meet his sister. After several hours of drinking, Varley had become intoxicated. At the same time, RCMP Constable Michael Ferguson had just finished taking two prospective officers for an extensive ride in his police car, showing them the ins-and-outs of the area. He dropped them off just an hour before the pubs closed at 3:00 a.m., according to the Crown.

Ferguson received a call from the RCMP dispatcher based in Red Deer about an intoxicated complainant, Darren Varley, reporting a missing person. Varley phoned from the local hospital where he was checking on his friend, Tuckey, who had been just beaten up in a fight in which both men had been involved in with two other men. The fight had occurred in the pub parking lot as a result of Varley knocking down one of the men's wives.

The drunken Varley had given the RCMP dispatcher the first statement on what he incorrectly believed to be a missing woman, Chandelle. Constable Ferguson decided to arrest Darren Varley for public drunkenness and bring him to the local police detachment.

After placing Varley in the police car, Constable Ferguson returned to the hospital to investigate the missing persons report. Within minutes Varley had kicked out the police car window and attempted to slide out of the vehicle.

== Death ==
While at the police department, and booking Varley into the last jail cell, Constable Ferguson stated that Varley had pulled his bulletproof vest over his head and gained momentary control of his pistol through what experts testified was a little-known defect in the holster design. An altercation occurred at which time Ferguson regained enough control of the gun to fire two quick shots. One grazed the side of Varley's abdomen and the other shot pierced his skull just behind the ear. Varley, now breathing with severe difficulty, lay wounded on the cell floor while Constable Ferguson called the ambulance, which attended moments later. Varley was airlifted to a Calgary hospital where he was pronounced dead.

== Court verdict ==
After two attempts by the Crown which both ended in mistrials from hung juries to try Michael Ferguson for the killing of Darren Varley, a third attempt was made to try him for manslaughter. Five years after the killing of Darren Varley, Constable Michael Ferguson was found guilty and convicted of manslaughter.

The mandatory sentence for manslaughter in Canada, is a four-year closed prison term in incidents involving a firearm. Justice Ged Hawco, ruled to make a constitutional exemption to the firearm clause because the police revolver was present as a result of Constable Ferguson's duties and allow Michael Ferguson to serve an exceptional two-year less a day term in his own home. Justice Hawco came to the conclusion that Michael Ferguson fired the first shot in self-defense, but the second shot was unnecessary.

Justice Hawco stated in his Reasons for Judgment, "If I were to place Mr. Ferguson on this ladder of moral culpability, given the facts which the jury must have concluded, he would be on the very lower rungs."

== Sentence overruled ==
On September 26, 2006, the Alberta Court of Appeal overruled Justice Ged Hawko's decision to allow Ferguson the opportunity to serve his sentence at his house. The court ruled that Ferguson must serve a four-year prison term.

Family and supporters of Darren Varley expressed disappointment that he may be granted nearly immediate parole, having considered to have served nearly two years under house arrest which would be credited to his prison sentence.

On September 25, 2006, Ferguson began a four-year prison sentence.

By early 2007 Ferguson was out on parole and the Supreme Court had agreed to hear Ferguson's appeal. In 2008, the appeal struck down his sentence. According to his lawyer, Noel O'Brien, the decision was based on the conclusion that "where a mandatory minimum sentence amounts to 'cruel and unusual punishment' and thus a violation under s. 12 of the Charter Of Rights, the only option open to a trial judge is to strike down the legislation itself, even if the mandatory punishment would be constitutional in the vast majority of cases. The ruling means that if a law creating a mandatory minimum sentence is unconstitutional for "any" individual, it will be unconstitutional for "all" individuals."

== See also ==
- List of controversies involving the Royal Canadian Mounted Police
- Ian Bush
