= Royal Commission of Inquiry into Certain Activities of the RCMP =

1977–81 Canadian policing investigation

Commission of Inquiry Concerning Certain Activities of the Royal Canadian Mounted Police
- Also known as: McDonald Commission
- Commissioners: David Cargill McDonald (Chair); Donald Sheridan Rickerd; Guy Gilbert
- Inquiry period: 6 July 1977 – August 1981
- Authorized: Order in Council P.C. 1977-1911

The Commission of Inquiry Concerning Certain Activities of the Royal Canadian Mounted Police (French: Commission d'enquête sur certaines activités de la Gendarmerie royale du Canada), better known as the McDonald Commission (French: Commission McDonald), was a Royal Commission called by the Canadian government of Pierre Trudeau to investigate the Royal Canadian Mounted Police after a number of illegal activities by the RCMP Security Service came to light in the 1970s. The Commission, chaired by Judge David Cargill McDonald, was established on 6 July 1977 and issued its final report in 1981.

== Background ==
During the 1970 October Crisis, the Front de libération du Québec (FLQ) kidnapped and killed Quebec cabinet minister Pierre Laporte. Prime Minister Pierre Trudeau responded by invoking the War Measures Act. Despite having provided good intelligence to law enforcement agencies on the FLQ threat, the Royal Canadian Mounted Police (RCMP), and more specifically, the RCMP Security Service responsible for both national security intelligence and national security policing at the time, was blamed for failing to prevent the crisis. Hurt by the criticism, the RCMP Security Service began a pattern of illegal activities in an attempt to prevent any similar incidents from occurring in the lead up to and during the 1976 Summer Olympics in Montreal.

The cause of the McDonald Commission was accidental; a former RCMP member on trial for bombing a private residence offered in his defence that he had done much worse things while serving on the RCMP Security Service, including having broken into the press office used by left-wing Quebec groups to steal membership lists. In response to these allegations, the McDonald Commission was created to investigate and report on the extent of RCMP wrongdoing.

== Enquiry ==
The McDonald Commission examined a number of allegations made against the RCMP, including its theft of the membership list of the Parti Québécois, several break-ins; illegal opening of mail; burning a barn in Quebec where the Black Panther Party and Front de libération du Québec were rumoured to be planning a rendezvous; forging documents; and conducting illegal electronic surveillance.

== Reports and findings ==
The Commission produced three reports:

- First Report: Security and Information (26 November 1979)
- Second Report: Freedom and Security under the Law, 2 volumes (23 January 1981)
- Third Report: Certain R.C.M.P. Activities and the Question of Governmental Knowledge (15 May 1981)

A supplement to the third report was also published on 30 January 1984.

== Recommendations ==
The Commission's reports recommended that police be required to obey the law and that judicial authorization be required before police could open mail. Its principal recommendation was to remove responsibility for national security from the RCMP and assign it to a new civilian spy agency. This recommendation was followed with the establishment of the Canadian Security Intelligence Service (CSIS) in 1984.

The McDonald Commission recommended the War Measures Act be amended to focus on powers necessary during times of war, invasion or insurrection, while other emergencies be dealt with by ad hoc legislation.

The McDonald Commission also recommended that the role of Parliament be increased during emergencies, including the requirement that Parliament confirm the state of emergency, renew the state of emergency, and if not sitting, Parliament be summoned within seven days for such a declaration.

The Commission further called for the information used by the government to declare an emergency be presented to Parliament publicly, with sensitive or classified materials being provided to an appropriate committee or during an in-camera session of Parliament.

The McDonald Commission also called for:

- the power to create a new court to hear complaints from individuals whose rights had been infringed upon,
- the War Measures Act to state which elements of Canada's Bill of Rights would be notwithstanding during a declaration, and
- that the Article 4 rights enshrined under the International Covenant on Civil and Political Rights never be overridden.

Despite the McDonald Commission report being completed and released publicly in 1981, it was never tabled in Parliament or fully debated.

Some of the recommendations of the McDonald Commission were included in the Emergencies Act which replaced the War Measures Act in 1988.

== See also ==
- List of cases of police brutality in Canada
- List of controversies involving the Royal Canadian Mounted Police
- National Security and Intelligence Committee of Parliamentarians

== Sources ==
- SIRC (2005). Reflections, Security Intelligence Review Committee, 2005 (ISBN 0-662-68695-0) (online: PDF, HTML)
- Holthuis, Annemieke E. (1991). The Emergencies Act, the Canadian Charter of Rights and Freedoms, and International Law: The Protection of Human Rights in States of Emergency (L.L.M.). McGill University. OCLC 1265038446.
