= Catherine Galliford =

Canadian police officer (1966–2025)

- Born: December 28, 1966; Vancouver, Canada
- Died: August 15, 2025 (aged 58); Kamloops, British Columbia
- Occupation: Police officer

Catherine Galliford (December 28, 1966 – August 15, 2025) was a Royal Canadian Mounted Police Corporal in British Columbia. She served as a police spokesperson. She was also known for her allegations of sexual harassment and misconduct in the RCMP.

== Career in RCMP ==
After graduating from the RCMP academy in 1991, Galliford rose up the ranks and became a corporal. In the 90s and 2000s, she served as a spokesperson for the RCMP during various high-profile cases, such as the trial on the bombing of Air India Flight 182 and the investigation into the serial killer Robert Pickton. She also served as a spokesperson for the Missing Women's Task Force (associated with the BC Missing Women Investigation).

In 2011, Galliford came to prominence for bringing forward allegations of extensive sexual harassment and misconduct within the RCMP. Chief among her allegations is the claim that officers in the Missing Women's Task Force neglected their duties and tolerated a three-year delay in apprehending serial killer Robert Pickton. When asked to testify before the Missing Women Commission of Inquiry, Galliford stated that she would not be testifying for the RCMP "but rather, on behalf of the victims." The individuals she named included Rob Nicholson, the Attorney General of Canada, Ian MacDonald, a doctor for the RCMP, and four officers. One month before hearings began in 2012, the inquiry deemed Galliford "too fragile" to testify, citing alcoholism and post traumatic stress disorder.

After Galliford came forward, the RCMP denied her accusations and sought to dismiss her from the force. In 2012, Galliford launched a civil suit. In 2013, a 2015 trial date was set for her case, but this was later delayed again to 2017. A class action lawsuit proceeded alongside hers and Janet Merlo has credited Galliford with inspiring four hundred female police officers to join it. In May 2016, Galliford dropped her complaint against Dr. Ian MacDonald and accepted a settlement from the other defendants. She was subsequently given a medical discharge from the RCMP. Galliford claimed to have lost her house from the various personal and legal issues arising from the court case.

== Personal life and death ==
Galliford grew up in the Vancouver area and later moved to Prince George, B.C.

She was married to Darren Campbell, who was, in 2015, a sergeant major for the RCMP. Their son, Connor Campbell, was arrested in September 2015 along with two others for the murder of 19-year old Langley resident Nicholas Hannon. Connor Campbell was convicted in November 2016 and called Galliford every day after the life sentence began. Galliford stated that the effects of PTSD and agoraphobia prevented her from attending the sentencing. She later said "I carry some guilt because after watching what I went through, I know that he developed a mistrust of the RCMP. But I think parents are parents, and I was a good parent. I know that."

Galliford died from liver cancer in Kamloops, on August 15, 2025, at the age of 58.
