= RCMP Security Service =

Intelligence branch of the Royal Canadian Mounted Police

The RCMP Security Service (French: Service de sécurité de la GRC) was a branch of the Royal Canadian Mounted Police (RCMP) that had responsibility for domestic intelligence and security in Canada. It was replaced by the Canadian Security Intelligence Service (CSIS) in 1984 on the recommendation of the McDonald Commission, which was called in the wake of major scandals during the 1970s.

== History ==
The RCMP carried out extensive security service work since the force was reconstituted in 1920, when it merged with the Dominion Police and became the federal police agency solely responsible for national security. Between the wars, this work was overwhelmingly directed at the Communist Party, as well as labour unions and Marxists more generally. It was in 1946 that the RCMP's Intelligence Section was put in charge of national security work.

In 1950, the RCMP's Special Branch was formally established to conduct its counterintelligence operations. Prior to that, the branch was a component of the RCMP's Criminal Investigation Branch, where political security operations and criminal investigations were not distinct before 1936. The first Special Branch class was held in 1953.

In 1962, the branch was renamed the Directorate of Security and Intelligence, and in 1970, it became the RCMP Security Service. During the 1960s, it targeted Quebec nationalists, particularly the militant Front de libération du Québec (FLQ). As a result of illegal tactics, including illegal surveillance and vigilantism, used by the RCMP Security Service and the consequent scandals surrounding the RCMP, intelligence work was transferred to a new agency, CSIS in 1984 through the implementation of Bill C-9.

=== Legacy ===
The RCMP has again become involved in intelligence work, particularly related to counterterrorism, following the bombing of Air India Flight 182 in 1985 and the 9/11 attacks under the Security Offences Act.
