= Keable Inquiry into Illegal Police Activities =

The Keable Inquiry into Illegal Police Activities, formally the Commission d'enquête sur des opérations policières en territoire québécois [Commission of Inquiry into Police Operations in Quebec Territory], was a Quebec commission of inquiry created in 1977 and tasked with investigating police actions in Quebec following the October Crisis of 1970.

Chaired by Jean Keable, the commission released its report on March 6, 1981. Among other things, it recommended that police officers who had engaged in illegal activities between 1971 and 1973 under the pretext of fighting terrorism in Quebec be prosecuted.

== Mandate ==
The commission's initial mandate was “to investigate the circumstances surrounding the search carried out at the premises of the Free Press Agency on the night of October 6–7, 1972,”; the Minister of Justice later expanded this mandate to include all police operations within Quebec.

Although the commission was not tasked with investigating the October Crisis, it had to question several individuals involved in it. This led to doubts, reinforced by the media, about the commission's unofficial mandate, namely to investigate the October Crisis itself.
