= Janet Merlo =

Janet Merlo (born 1963 in Newfoundland, Canada) joined the Royal Canadian Mounted Police (RCMP) in 1991 and was transferred to British Columbia. In 2007, she filed a lawsuit against the RCMP for what she described as almost daily harassment. In 2010, she took a medical discharge from the police service. In 2012, after speaking publicly about gender based harassment in the RCMP (Canada's National Police Force), Merlo became the representative plaintiff in a proposed class action lawsuit against the force and the Solicitor General of Canada. The group of current and retired female police officers who have requested to join the class action has now grown to almost 400. In June, 2015, Merlo's lawyers presented arguments to the court in British Columbia asking for class action status, due to allegations of systemic sexual harassment and misconduct.

In her memoir, No One To Tell: Breaking My Silence on Life in the RCMP, published by Breakwater Books in 2013, Merlo detailed the discrimination she experienced and the depression it led to. She stated that the sexual harassment led to post-traumatic stress syndrome.
