= List of Montreal Canadiens presidents =

The following is a list of Montreal Canadiens presidents.

President	Since	Until
Ambrose O'Brien	1909	1910
Hector Bisaillon	1910	1913
U.P. Boucher	1913	1916
George Kennedy	1916	1921
Hon. Athanase David	1921	1935
Ernest Savard	1935	1938
Hon. Donat Raymond	1938	1957
Hon. Hartland de Montarville Molson	1957	1964
J. David Molson	1964	1972
Jacques Courtois	1972	1978
Morgan McCammon	1978	1982
Ronald Corey	1982	1999
Pierre Boivin	1999	2011
Geoff Molson	2011	2025

Jeff Gorton

 2025
