= Reid Morden =

Canadian civil servant (1941–2024)

Reid Morden OC

2nd Director of the Canadian Security Intelligence Service
- In office 1988–1992
- Prime Minister: Brian Mulroney
- Minister: Perrin Beatty; Bill McKnight; Marcel Masse
- Preceded by: Ted Finn
- Succeeded by: Ray Protti

Personal details
- Born: John Reid Morden; June 17, 1941 Hamilton, Ontario, Canada
- Died: May 7, 2024 (aged 82) Toronto, Ontario, Canada
- Education: Dalhousie University

John Reid Morden OC (June 17, 1941 – May 7, 2024) was a Canadian civil servant who was the director of the Canadian Security Intelligence Service from 1988 to 1992. From 1991 to 1994, Morden served as deputy minister of foreign affairs.

== Early life and education ==
Morden was born on June 17, 1941, in Hamilton, Ontario. As a child, he moved to Montreal, Quebec before moving to Halifax, Nova Scotia.

Morden graduated from Dalhousie University in 1963 with a bachelor of laws. He later received an honorary doctorate of law from Dalhousie.

== Career ==
Morden started his career with the Canadian Department of External Affairs. His first posting was in Pakistan. From 1991 to 1994, Morden served as deputy minister of foreign affairs.

Morden was named director of CSIS in 1988 and served in that capacity for four years. While there, he oversaw the destruction of security files for John Diefenbaker, Lester B. Pearson and Pierre Elliott Trudeau on January 30, 1989.

Later he caused a stir by defending former director Ted Finn's erasing of 156 tapes of evidence before the Air India inquiry.

In addition, Morden has served as president of Atomic Energy of Canada Limited from 1994 to 1998. He also worked in the private sector with Kroll and KPMG Forensic Inc. In June 2005, Morden was appointed to assist the commission of inquiry dealing with the case of Maher Arar.

== Death ==
Morden died in Toronto, Ontario, on May 7, 2024, at the age of 82.

== Awards ==
In 1999, Morden was made a member of the Order of Canada.
