= Ward Elcock =

Canadian civil servant

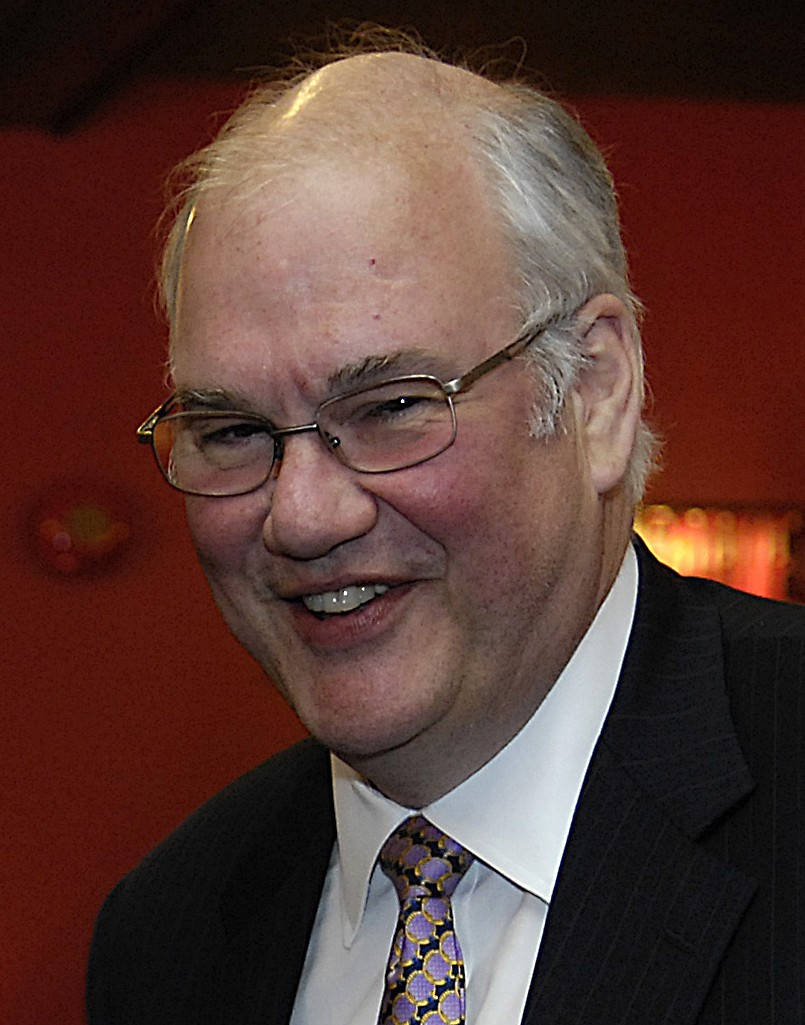
- Elcock in 2007

4th Director of the Canadian Security Intelligence Service
- In office 1994–2004
- Governor General: Ray Hnatyshyn
- Prime Minister: Jean Chrétien
- Preceded by: Ray Protti
- Succeeded by: Dale Neufeld

Personal details
- Born: August 1947 (age 79) Victoria, British Columbia

Ward P. D. Elcock (born August 1947) is a Canadian civil servant who served as the director of the Canadian Security Intelligence Service from 1994 until May 2004. He remains the only Director to have ever served out his entire tenure. He served as the Deputy Minister of National Defence from August 5, 2004 to October 1, 2007.

== Biography ==
He was born in 1947 in Victoria, British Columbia to Commodore F. Dudley Elcock and Mary Grace Pitfield and is the oldest of four children (Hew, Julia and Mark (deceased)). He is the great-grandson of Hartland MacDougall and grandson of deceased Canadian financier Ward C. Pitfield and Grace Pitfield (née MacDougall). He is the nephew of former Clerk of the Privy Council of Canada, the retired Senator Michael Pitfield, and retired financier Ward C. Pitfield, Jr.

A Bachelor's graduate in Political Science from Carleton University, Elcock received his LL.B. from Osgoode Hall Law School.

Elcock served as the Security & Intelligence Deputy Clerk of the Privy Council Office for five years, and as Assistant Secretary to the Cabinet (Legislation and House Planning/Counsel) for six years, prior to his rise to CSIS and National Defence. In 2007, Elcock was named Senior Advisor to the Privy Council Office "pending his next assignment".

In 2010, he was the chief of the Integrated Security Units organized for the 2010 Winter Olympics in Vancouver, the 36th G8 summit in Huntsville, and the 4th G-20 summit in Toronto. Between 2010 and 2016 he was Special Advisor on Human Smuggling and Illegal Migration in the Privy Council Office.

Elcock lives in Ottawa and is married with two children.
