= Jim Judd =

Canadian diplomat and senior civil servant

James Judd (born August 1947) is a Canadian retired diplomat and senior civil servant. He served as the director of the Canadian Security Intelligence Service (CSIS). He was appointed to the position by Liberal prime minister Paul Martin on November 29, 2004 and retired from the position on June 27, 2009, before the end of his term. He was succeeded by Richard Fadden, the former Deputy Minister of Citizenship and Immigration Canada.

== Early life ==
Judd was born in August 1947 in Montreal, Quebec. Before entering university, he lived in Germany and the Netherlands, and several places in Canada, including Edmonton, Fort Nelson, Whitehorse, Carleton Place and CFB Borden. He graduated from Carleton University where he received his Honours B.A. in political science and a master's degree majoring in international relations at the Norman Paterson School of International Affairs.

== Career ==
=== Department of Foreign Affairs and International Trade ===
Between 1973 and 1987, Judd worked in several positions within Canada's Department of Foreign Affairs and International Trade (DFAIT), both in Ottawa and outside of Canada.

He spent two years (1975 to 1977) serving as second secretary at the Canadian Embassy in Caracas, Venezuela.

Between 1977 and 1981, he worked at the Personnel Operations Bureau of the Department of External Affairs.

From 1981 to 1982, Judd worked as the Secretary of the Restrictive Trade Practices Enquiry on Competitiveness in the Canadian Petroleum Industry. Afterwards, between 1982 and 1983, Judd worked as a senior advisor to the Deputy Minister (for Reorganization) at the Department of External Affairs.

Between 1983 and 1987 he was Counsellor and Congressional Liaison at the Canadian Embassy in Washington, D.C.

=== Other roles in government ===
Between 1987 and 1990, he was the senior departmental assistant in the Canadian Office of the Secretary of State for External Affairs.

Between 1991 and 1992, he served as chief of staff to the president of the Queen's Privy Council for Canada and minister responsible for constitutional affairs. Between 1992 and 1994, he was the assistant secretary to the Cabinet for Foreign and Defence Policy in the Privy Council Office

In September 1994, Judd was working on special assignment in the Deputy Minister's Office of the Department of Foreign Affairs and International Trade until, in July 1995, he became assistant deputy minister corporate services in the department.

=== Department of Finance ===
In November 1996, Judd was appointed G-7 Deputy and Assistant Deputy Minister, International Trade and Finance of the Department of Finance.

=== National Defence ===
In February 1998, he was named Deputy Minister of National Defence.

=== Treasury ===
On May 13, 2002, Judd was appointed Secretary of the Treasury Board and Comptroller General of Canada. He later declared that the Public Works Department, not the Prime Minister, was responsible for the mismanagement of funds investigated by the Gomery Inquiry.

=== Director of CSIS (2004–2009) ===
On November 29, 2004, Judd was appointed to the position of director of Canadian Security Intelligence Service (CSIS), by Liberal Prime Minister Paul Martin.

==== War on terrorism ====
On March 8, 2005, Judd was asked by Canadian Senator David Paul Smith about whether Canadian mosques were being monitored by CSIS, to which Judd replied that he was unaware of any such policy. Assistant Director Dale Neufeld then interjected, and confirmed that CSIS was indeed monitoring Canadian mosques, which it suspected of recruiting and funding terrorism.

Later that month, Judd addressed the Senate of Canada and said that Kassem Daher was a Canadian citizen, and member of Usbat-al-Ansar.

In August 2005, Judd announced that Canadian citizens were fighting as part of the Iraqi insurgency, an announcement that was met with derision from the Prime Minister's office. In October 2005, Judd said the 2003 Invasion of Iraq was creating "long-term problems" for other countries, including Canada. While facing criticism for CSIS's role in handling the case of Mohamed Harkat and other Muslim-Canadians detained under Security certificates in November 2005, he offered the Members of Parliament the chance to "ride along with agents" as they conducted interrogations of others. In July 2006, he announced that several hundred Canadians were being investigated for "pro-al-Qaeda sympathies"

In August 2006, he referred to the concept of racial profiling as "fundamentally stupid".

On March 31, 2009, veteran CSIS lawyer and advisor Geoffrey O'Brian told the Commons Committee on Public Safety that CSIS would use information obtained under torture. Testifying on the same committee on April 2, 2009, Jim Judd said O'Brian would be recanting his statement in a letter.

==== Leaked diplomatic cables ====
On November 29, 2010, a leaked U.S. diplomatic cable sent from the U.S. Embassy in Ottawa dated July 2, 2008 reported a meeting between Judd and US State Department official Eliot Cohen. In the meeting Jim Judd, then head of the Canadian Security Intelligence Service, tells Eliot Cohen that the Canadian spy agency was still "vigorously harassing" known sympathizers of Hezbollah in Canada.

In the same cable the American officer quotes Jim Judd as he laments a soon to be released video of Canadian citizen Omar Khadr being interrogated by CSIS's officers at American Guantanamo Bay detention camp in Cuba. Judd refers to video saying that it "would likely show three ... adults interrogating a kid who breaks down in tears. He adds the comment that the release of the video would trigger "knee-jerk anti-Americanism" and "paroxysms of moral outrage, a Canadian specialty," he says.

In another instance, Jim Judd said Canadians and their courts had an "Alice in Wonderland" worldview and he "derided" Canadian court judgments that, as per his view, threaten foreign governments' intelligence-sharing with Canada. The cable goes on reporting Judd as having said that "These judgments posit that Canadian authorities cannot use information that 'may have been' derived from torture, and that any Canadian public official who conveys such information may be subject to criminal prosecution."

==== Views on China ====
In testimony before the Senate Committee on National Security and Defence in April 2007, Judd appeared concerned about Chinese espionage activities. The alarm had been raised publicly in 2005 by Chen Yonglin, a former Chinese diplomat who defected to Australia, insisting that China had 1,000 agents operating there. Chen also claimed that similar numbers of Chinese spies also surveil in Canada. As of April 2007, Judd had almost half of CSIS resources devoted to counter the Chinese.

From its inception in January 2006, the Harper government took a hard line with the Chinese. As of 2007, they maintained that position. The government stance has changed radically since then, signalled in spring 2009 by the purchase of a 17% share fraction of Teck Resources by the China Investment Corporation.

Since that time, the Canada China Energy and Environment Forum has seen a vast increase in business associated with the National Energy Administration of China. A framework agreement was signed in October 2013 by Alberta Energy Minister Ken Hughes to give provincial officials "unprecedented access" to Chinese decision-makers, strengthening ties to "what we believe will become one of our key markets" for energy products.

==== Retirement from CSIS 8 months before schedule ====
In April 2009, Judd announced his resignation from the post effective in June of that year, before his term was scheduled to end in November 2009.

He resigned 8 months after the appointment of cancer specialist Professor Arthur T. Porter to the Security Intelligence Review Committee which has the mandate to review the activities of Judd's operations or the operations of any future Director of CSIS. He was succeeded by Richard Fadden.

== Sources ==
- CSIS profile on Judd
- Bio from University of Saskatchewan
