= Greta Bossenmaier =

Canadian civil servant

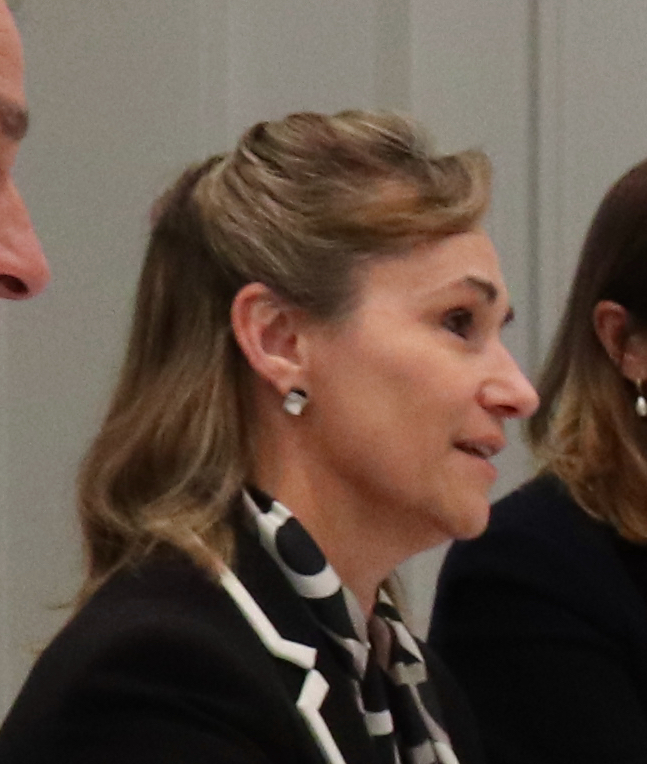
- Occupation: civil servant

Greta Bossenmaier is a retired Canadian civil servant.

== Biography ==
The Prime Minister, Justin Trudeau, issued the following statement on the upcoming retirement of Greta Bossenmaier: "Today, I announce the retirement of my National Security and Intelligence Advisor, Greta Bossenmaier, in early December 2019, from the Public Service.

"Ms. Bossenmaier has served Canadians with dedication, integrity, and excellence over the past 35 years, including in senior roles such as Chief of the Communications Security Establishment; Deputy Minister, Afghanistan Task Force, Privy Council Office; and Senior Associate Deputy Minister of International Development. Greta Bossenmaier, who was previously the chief of the Communications Security Establishment. She was appointed on May 23, 2018, filling the vacancy left when her predecessor, Daniel Jean, retired.
