= Eva Plunkett =

Eva Plunkett was the inspector-general of the Canadian Security Intelligence Service (CSIS) from December 2003 until her retirement in December 2011. Plunkett was responsible for reviewing the spy agency's operational activities.

She has criticised her role in the agency, stating that CSIS' mandate is not clearly defined, and thus is it difficult for her to judge whether or not specific operations fall outside of their domain. She also criticised what she considered to be unreasonable delays by CSIS to provide her with the necessary information to perform her duties. After her retirement, the Government of Canada abolished the position of inspector-general and handed its responsibilities to the Security Intelligence Review Committee, saying it would save money and eliminate duplication. Plunkett stated that it was a loss for Canada, and that it was ridiculous to think that the committee could easily replicate the functions of the inspector-general.

Plunkett spent 28 years serving in the Solicitor General's office.

In April 2006, Plunkett explained that she believed that emphasis was needed on "traditional" roles of counter-espionage, such as defending classified secrets, rather than focusing strictly on the war on terror.

Plunkett also served on the Board of Advisors for Carleton University's Canadian Centre of Intelligence and Security Studies program.
