= Marie-Lucie Morin =

Canadian politician

Marie-Lucie Morin PC CM is a Canadian public official, lawyer, and former diplomat and a former Committee member of the National Security and Intelligence Review Agency of Canada, and was also the same for its predecessor the Security Intelligence Review Committee from 2015, until the latter was superseded by the former in 2019. As such, she is also a member of the King's Privy Council for Canada and entitled to be styled as The Honourable. She is on the board of directors of AGT Food and Ingredients and Stantec since 2016.

Morin was the executive director for Canada, Ireland and the Caribbean at the World Bank from 2010 to 2013. Previously, from 2008 until 2010, she was National Security Advisor to the Prime Minister of Canada and associate secretary to the Cabinet. She served as deputy minister of international trade from 2006 to 2008 and as associate deputy minister of foreign affairs from 2003 to 2006. She served as Canadian ambassador to Norway from 1997 to 2001. In 2016, Morin was appointed to the Order of Canada.

She is a graduate of the Université de Sherbrooke. She is a member of the Bar of Quebec.
