= Gary Filmon =

Premier of Manitoba from 1988 to 1999

The Honourable Gary Filmon PC OC OM

19th Premier of Manitoba
- In office May 9, 1988 – October 5, 1999
- Monarch: Elizabeth II
- Lieutenant Governor: George Johnson; Yvon Dumont; Peter Liba
- Deputy: Glen Cummings; James Downey
- Preceded by: Howard Pawley
- Succeeded by: Gary Doer

Leader of the Opposition in Manitoba
- In office October 5, 1999 – May 29, 2000
- Preceded by: Gary Doer
- Succeeded by: Bonnie Mitchelson
- In office December 10, 1983 – May 9, 1988
- Preceded by: Sterling Lyon
- Succeeded by: Gary Doer

Minister of Consumer and Corporate Affairs
- In office January 16, 1981 – November 30, 1981
- Preceded by: Warner Jorgenson
- Succeeded by: Eugene Kostyra

Member of the Legislative Assembly of Manitoba for Tuxedo (River Heights; 1979–1981)
- In office October 16, 1979 – September 18, 2000
- Preceded by: Sidney Spivak
- Succeeded by: Heather Stefanson

Personal details
- Born: Gary Albert Filmon; August 24, 1942 (age 84) Winnipeg, Manitoba, Canada
- Party: Progressive Conservative
- Spouse: Janice Wainwright (m. 1963)
- Children: 4
- Education: University of Manitoba
- Occupation: Civil engineer
- Cabinet: Minister of Consumer and Corporate Affairs (1981); Minister of Environment (1981)

Gary Albert Filmon PC OC OM (born August 24, 1942) is a Canadian former politician from Manitoba who served as the 19th premier of Manitoba. He was the leader of the Progressive Conservative Party of Manitoba from 1983 to 2000, and served as the premier from 1988 to 1999.

== Early life ==
Gary Albert Filmon was born in Winnipeg, Manitoba, to working-class parents, and is of Romanian and Polish-Ukrainian background. His Romanian father anglicized the family name from Filimon to Filmon when he emigrated westward to Canada.

Filmon was educated at the University of Manitoba and subsequently worked as a civil engineer. In 1963, he married Janice Wainwright.

== Political career ==
=== Municipal politics ===
Filmon entered public life in 1975, being elected to the Winnipeg City Council; for the next four years, Filmon was a member of Winnipeg's Independent Citizens' Election Committee, an unofficial alliance of centre-right Liberal and Progressive Conservative interests in the city.

=== Provincial politics ===
In 1979, Filmon won a by-election to the Legislative Assembly of Manitoba in the riding of River Heights, held after the resignation of former Tory leader Sidney Spivak. On January 16, 1981, Filmon was appointed Minister of Consumer and Corporate Affairs and Minister of Environment in the government of Sterling Lyon.

Lyon's Tories were defeated later in 1981 by the New Democratic Party under Howard Pawley, though Filmon was re-elected in the new riding of Tuxedo. He was elected to replace Lyon as party leader in 1983, defeating Brian Ransom and Clayton Manness at a delegated convention. At the time, Filmon was considered to be on the party's progressive wing. Supporters of Ransom would later allege that Filmon's campaign team had sponsored Manness' candidacy as a means of splitting the conservative vote.

Filmon's Tories narrowly lost the 1986 election, winning 26 seats against 30 for the NDP. This election was generally regarded as lacking in defining issues, and the two major parties were not seen as having many ideological divisions between them.

==== Premiership ====
Howard Pawley's slender majority government fell in 1988 when disgruntled NDP backbencher Jim Walding broke ranks and joined the opposition to vote down Pawley's budget. In the subsequent election, the Manitoba Liberal Party rose from one seat to twenty, taking seats away from both the Tories and the NDP in the process. The NDP, led by Gary Doer (Pawley had resigned after the writs were dropped), fell to 12 seats and third place. The Tories dropped to 25 seats, but nevertheless emerged as the largest party in the legislature. Filmon himself was almost defeated by a Liberal candidate in Tuxedo; but he survived by 123 votes. After the NDP agreed to tolerate a PC minority government, Filmon became Premier.

The 1988-1990 parliament was most notable for its debates on the Meech Lake Accord, which would have confirmed the distinct status of Quebec within Canada. The Pawley government had supported this initiative, but Filmon was initially opposed to it, and the Manitoba assembly refused to ratify the treaty (rather to the embarrassment of federal Tory Prime Minister Brian Mulroney). Filmon eventually agreed to a compromise deal negotiated by Jean Charest in 1990. However, he was a lukewarm supporter of the compromise at best, and it came to nothing when New Democratic MLA Elijah Harper refused to grant unanimous consent for debate before the bill's deadline. (Harper objected to the fact that the Accord did not recognize the rights of Indigenous peoples.)

In other matters, Filmon was closer to the policies of the Mulroney government. He supported the 1987 free trade initiative, and worked in favour of the Charlottetown Accord (a successor to Meech Lake) in 1992.

Filmon called an election in 1990, and campaigned on the need for a majority government. Despite the increased unpopularity of the Mulroney government at the federal level, Filmon's Tories were able to win over many voters who had supported the Liberals in 1988. His party won thirty seats, and the NDP re-emerged as the official opposition with twenty.

While not an ideological conservative in the tradition of Margaret Thatcher, Filmon nonetheless presided over an austerity program of budget cuts. His government's measures resulted in a balanced budget in 1995, the province's first in 20 years. Filmon also permitted suburban regions to break away from the amalgamated city of Winnipeg, reversing the policies initiated by the Edward Schreyer government in the early 1970s. In 1993, Filmon supported Kim Campbell's bid to lead the Progressive Conservative Party of Canada (Winnipeg Free Press, 13 June 1993).

Despite government cuts to social programs and urban development, Filmon's Tories were able to retain their majority in 1995, losing only one seat. This was due in part to the unpopularity of Bob Rae's NDP government in neighbouring Ontario, and concerns that the Manitoba NDP would govern in a similar manner under Doer if elected. Subsequently, the Filmon government privatized the province's telephone system, mandated balanced budgets, and took actions limiting the power of teacher's and nurse's unions. While Filmon avoided the rhetoric of Ontario Premier Mike Harris (1995–2002), there were nevertheless strong similarities to the reforms instituted by these governments in the late 1990s.

In the late 1990s, the reputation of the Filmon government was damaged by a scandal involving vote-rigging in the 1995 election. A number of independent "aboriginal issues" candidates were alleged to have been commissioned by Progressive Conservative organizers to run in NDP ridings under the banner of Independent Native Voice in an attempt to split the left-of-centre vote. Filmon was not personally implicated, but a number of his senior aides were. Manitoba also experienced increased unemployment during this period, with Filmon's popularity suffering as a result.

Notwithstanding these setbacks, Filmon sought a fourth mandate in late 1999. During this campaign, he announced that his government would undertake a further right-wing policy shift if re-elected. He promised half a billion dollars in new tax cuts, while claiming that he could simultaneously re-invest an identical amount into health and education. This announcement was greeted with skepticism from many voters, and the Tories lost to Doer's NDP by 32 seats to 24 (the Liberals were reduced to one seat, as many Liberal voters from 1995 shifted to the NDP). Filmon resigned as party leader in 2000, and stood down as an MLA in the same year.

== Post-political career ==
Filmon was appointed to the federal Security Intelligence Review Committee on October 4, 2001, which necessitated an appointment to the Queen's Privy Council for Canada. He was promoted to chair of SIRC on June 24, 2005 following the retirement of Paule Gauthier.

Filmon has also worked as a business consultant since his retirement from office. In 2003, he was commissioned by the government of British Columbia to undertake a survey of forest fires in that province. On June 22, 2005, at the Annual General Meeting of the Exchange Industrial Income Fund (EIF.UN-X), Filmon was elected as the chairman of the board of trustees for the ensuing year. Filmon sat on the board of directors of Manitoba's public telephone utility, MTS, from 2003 until his mandatory retirement in 2015.

In February 2006, Filmon was considered to replace Frank McKenna as Canadian Ambassador to the United States. In the end, Michael Wilson was appointed to this post.

In 2009, he was made an Officer of the Order of Canada "for his contributions to public office and to the province of Manitoba, as well as for his continuing leadership on numerous provincial and national boards, committees and organizations".

He is married to Janice Filmon, who was lieutenant governor of Manitoba from 2015 to 2022. For the duration of his spouse's term in that office, Gary Filmon was styled "His Honour".

Legislative Assembly of Manitoba
Preceded by Sidney Spivak	Member of the Legislative Assembly for River Heights; 1979–1981	Succeeded by Warren Steen
New constituency	Member of the Legislative Assembly for Tuxedo; 1981–2000	Succeeded by Heather Stefanson
Political offices
Preceded by	Minister of the Environment; 1981	Succeeded by Jay Cowan as Minister responsible for Environmental Management
Preceded by	Minister of Consumer and Corporate Affairs; 1981	Succeeded by Eugene Kostyra
Preceded by Sterling Lyon	Leader of the Opposition; 1983–1988	Succeeded by Sharon Carstairs
Preceded by Howard Pawley	Premier of Manitoba; 1988–1999	Succeeded by Gary Doer
Preceded by	Minister of Federal/Provincial Relations; 1988–1999	Succeeded by Gary Doer
Preceded by Gary Doer	Leader of the Opposition; 1999–2000	Succeeded by Bonnie Mitchelson
Government offices
Preceded by Paule Gauthier	Chair of the Security Intelligence Review Committee; 2005–2010	Succeeded by Arthur Porter
Party political offices
Preceded by Sterling Lyon	Leader of the Progressive Conservative Party of Manitoba; 1983–2000	Succeeded by Bonnie Mitchelson (interim)
