= National Security Advisor (Canada) =

Security and intelligence advisor to the Canadian Prime Minister

National Security and Intelligence Advisor to the Prime Minister
- Conseiller à la sécurité nationale et au renseignement auprès du premier ministre
- Incumbent; David Morrison since 2026
- Government of Canada
- Abbreviation: NSIA
- Member of: Privy Council; Cabinet
- Reports to: Prime Minister of Canada
- Seat: Office of the Prime Minister and Privy Council building
- Appointer: Governor General of Canada on the advice of the prime minister
- Inaugural holder: Marie-Lucie Morin
- Deputy: Deputy National Security and Intelligence Advisor

The national security and intelligence advisor (French: conseiller à la sécurité nationale et au renseignement) is a public servant who advises the prime minister of Canada on security and intelligence matters. The position is supported by the Security and Intelligence Secretariat and the Intelligence Assessment Staff and holds the rank of associate secretary in the Privy Council Office (PCO).

== Responsibilities ==
The National Security and Intelligence Advisor has four main responsibilities:

- providing information, advice and recommendations on security and intelligence policy matters to the prime minister;
- co-ordinating members of the security and intelligence community;
- along with the deputy minister for the Department of National Defence, is accountable to the minister of national defence for the Communications Security Establishment; and
- overseeing the intelligence assessment function, specifically the production and co-ordination of intelligence assessments for the prime minister, other Cabinet members and senior government officials.

== History ==
The position was created in 2005 by Deputy Prime Minister Anne McLellan and had been tasked by Prime Minister Paul Martin to reorganize of Canada's national security scheme. She released a policy document called Securing an Open Society: Canada's National Security Policy.

Daniel Jean resigned after he suggested that Justin Trudeau's trip to India was sabotaged.

On 8 November 2019, Greta Bossenmaier retired from the Public Service of Canada. Foreign and Defence Policy Advisor David Morrison acted in the role while the Prime Minister's Office sought a permanent replacement.

On 22 January 2020, Vince Rigby took up the post, which had been filled in the interim since Bossenmaier's departure by David Morrison

Former National Defence Deputy Minister Jody Thomas took over the role on January 11, 2022.

In June 2023 Thomas reached into the Titan submersible implosion file, as the hysteria over the missing adventure tourists reached its peak.

== List of National Security Advisors ==
Prime Minister	Officeholder	Tenure start	Tenure end
Stephen Harper	Marie-Lucie Morin	2008	2010
Stephen Harper	Stephen Rigby	2010	2015
Stephen Harper; Justin Trudeau	Richard Fadden	2015	2016
Justin Trudeau	Daniel Jean	2016	2018
Justin Trudeau	Greta Bossenmaier	2018	2019
Justin Trudeau	David Morrison	2019	2020
Justin Trudeau	Vince Rigby	2020	2021
Justin Trudeau	Jody Thomas	2022	2024
Justin Trudeau; Mark Carney	Nathalie Drouin	2024	2026
Mark Carney	David Morrison	2026	
