= Paule Gauthier =

Canadian politician

Paule Gauthier, PC OC OQ QC (c.1943 – September 20, 2016) was a Canadian lawyer, arbitrator, and public servant.

== Biography ==
Born in Joliette, Quebec, she received a law degree from Université Laval in 1969. She was a senior partner in the law firm of Desjardins Ducharme Stein Monast and specialised in corporate and commercial law. In 1984 she was appointed to the Security Intelligence Review Committee which oversaw the Canadian Security Intelligence Service and was appointed to the Queen's Privy Council for Canada in accordance with the Official Secrets Act. She served on SIRC from 1984 to 1991 and 1995 to 2005. She served as Chair of SIRC from 1996 to 2005.

She served on numerous corporate and government boards and was president of the Canadian Bar Association from 1992 to 1993. She was also on the board of directors of Metro Inc. From 1994 to her death in 2016, Gauthier served as Honorary Consul General for Sweden in Quebec City.

In 1990, she was made an Officer of the Order of Canada. In 2001, she was made an Officer of the National Order of Quebec. Also in 2001 she was made an Officer of the Royal Order of the Polar Star, by His Majesty King Carl XVI Gustaf of Sweden and in 2008 she was elevated to Commander of that order.

Gauthier died on September 20, 2016, at the age of 72 following a short illness.

== See also ==
- Université Laval

Government offices
Preceded by Jaques Courtois	Chair of the Security Intelligence Review Committee (Canada); 1996–2005	Succeeded by Gary Filmon
