= Protti =

Protti is an Italian surname. Notable people with the surname include:

- Aldo Protti (1920–1995), Italian opera singer
- Anita Protti (born 1964), Swiss athlete
- Igor Protti (born 1967), Italian footballer
- Ijiel Protti (born 1995), Argentine professional footballer
- Ray Protti, former director of the Canadian Security Intelligence Service (CSIS)
