= David Vigneault =

9th director of the Canadian Security Intelligence Service

9th Director of the Canadian Security Intelligence Service
- In office June 19, 2017 – July 20, 2024
- Minister: Hon. Marco Mendicino
- Preceded by: Michel Coulombe
- Succeeded by: Vanessa Lloyd (interim)

Personal details
- Education: Université Laval (BA); Université de Montréal (MA)
- Occupation: Civil servant

David Vigneault is a Canadian civil servant who served as the 9th director of the Canadian Security Intelligence Service (CSIS) from June 2017 until July 2024.

== Biography ==
Vigneault worked at the Canada Border Services Agency and was promoted to "assistant director of intelligence" at the CSIS. Vigneault previously served with Assistant Director, Intelligence, and Assistant Director, Secretariat.

He also served as Director, Transnational Security at the Communications Security Establishment, Executive Assistant to Deputy Minister of National Defence.

Vigneault progressed to the position of "assistant secretary to cabinet advising on security and intelligence" in 2013.

Vigneault made headlines on February 9, 2021 when he spoke to the Centre for International Governance Innovation. In his first public speech since he was appointed Director, he named Russia, China, Cuba, North Korea, Vietnam, Laos and Venezuela as "countries of concern", said that "state actors have done 'significant harm' to Canadian companies" and pose "a significant danger to Canada's prosperity and sovereignty". The Sydney Morning Herald reported that he said "The government of China ... is pursuing a strategy for geopolitical advantage on all fronts – economic, technological, political, and military – and using all elements of state power to carry out activities that are a direct threat to our national security and sovereignty." Vigneault also remarked that his agency "works under outdated laws," saying the legislative powers are "better suited for the threats of the Cold War era" and called for new powers to address "significantly more complex" present circumstances.
