= Jody Thomas =

Canadian public servant

National Security and Intelligence Advisor to the Prime Minister of Canada
- In office January 11, 2022 – January 27, 2024
- Prime Minister: Justin Trudeau
- Preceded by: Vincent Rigby
- Succeeded by: Nathalie Drouin

Deputy Minister for the Department of National Defence
- In office October 2017 – January 2022
- Minister: Harjit Sajjan (2017–2021); Anita Anand (2021–2022)

Commissioner of the Canadian Coast Guard
- In office 2015–2017
- Minister: Hunter Tootoo (2015–2016); Dominic LeBlanc (2016–2017)

Jody Thomas is a Canadian public servant who was the national security advisor to the prime minister of Canada. Thomas has held a number of roles in the Public Service of Canada.

== Education ==
Thomas holds a Bachelor of Commerce from the University of Calgary and a Bachelor of Arts from Carleton University.

== Career ==
She has previously served as deputy minister for the Department of National Defence, commissioner of the Canadian Coast Guard, and chief operating officer for Passport Canada, and served as an officer in the Naval Reserve.

Thomas has been described as a realist on global issues, and "hawkish" towards China.

In June 2023, Thomas reached into the Titan submersible implosion file, as the hysteria over the missing adventure tourists reached its peak.
