= Nathalie Drouin =

Canadian diplomat

Her Excellency Nathalie Drouin

Ambassador of Canada to France and Monaco
- Incumbent
- Assumed office March 26, 2026
- Prime Minister: Mark Carney
- Preceded by: Stéphane Dion (2025)

National Security Advisor to the Prime Minister
- In office January 27, 2024 – 2026
- Prime Minister: Justin Trudeau; Mark Carney
- Preceded by: Jody Thomas
- Succeeded by: David Morrison

Personal details
- Education: Université Laval (LLB, MPA)

Nathalie G. Drouin is a Canadian diplomat and bureaucrat who formerly served as the national security adviser to the prime minister from 2024 to 2026. She has held a number of roles in the Public Service of Canada. In February 2026, Prime Minister Mark Carney announced her appointment as Canada's ambassador to France and Monaco.

== Life and career ==
Drouin is an alumnus of Université Laval, holding a Bachelor of Laws and a Master of Public Administration. She became a member of the Bar of Quebec in 1992. She has served in roles at the Autorité des marchés financiers and as deputy minister in the federal government.

In 2024, Prime Minister Justin Trudeau appointed her as national security advisor; she continued in this role during Mark Carney's premiership. Before becoming national security advisor, Drouin served as the deputy clerk of the Privy Council and associate secretary to the Cabinet from 2021 to 2024.

On February 2, 2026, Prime Minister Mark Carney announced Drouin's appointment as Canada's ambassador to France and Monaco, effective in spring 2026, replacing Stéphane Dion.
