= Dale Neufeld =

Dale Neufeld is a former director of the Canadian Security Intelligence Service. He was appointed to the position of Acting Director on 31 May 2004, succeeding Ward P.D. Elcock, and ran the service until Prime Minister Paul Martin chose Jim Judd as the new Director on 29 November 2004.

A graduate of the University of Saskatchewan, Mr. Neufeld joined the Royal Canadian Mounted Police in 1971 and left in 1984 to join CSIS. He was Deputy Director from 2001 to 2004.

On 8 March 2005, Jim Judd was asked by Senator David Paul Smith about whether Canadian mosques were being monitored by CSIS, to which Judd replied that he was unaware of any such policy. Assistant Director Neufeld then interjected, and confirmed that CSIS was indeed monitoring Canadian mosques, which it suspected of recruiting and funding terrorism.

Neufeld has since retired.
