= Richard Fadden =

Canadian civil servant

Richard Fadden OC
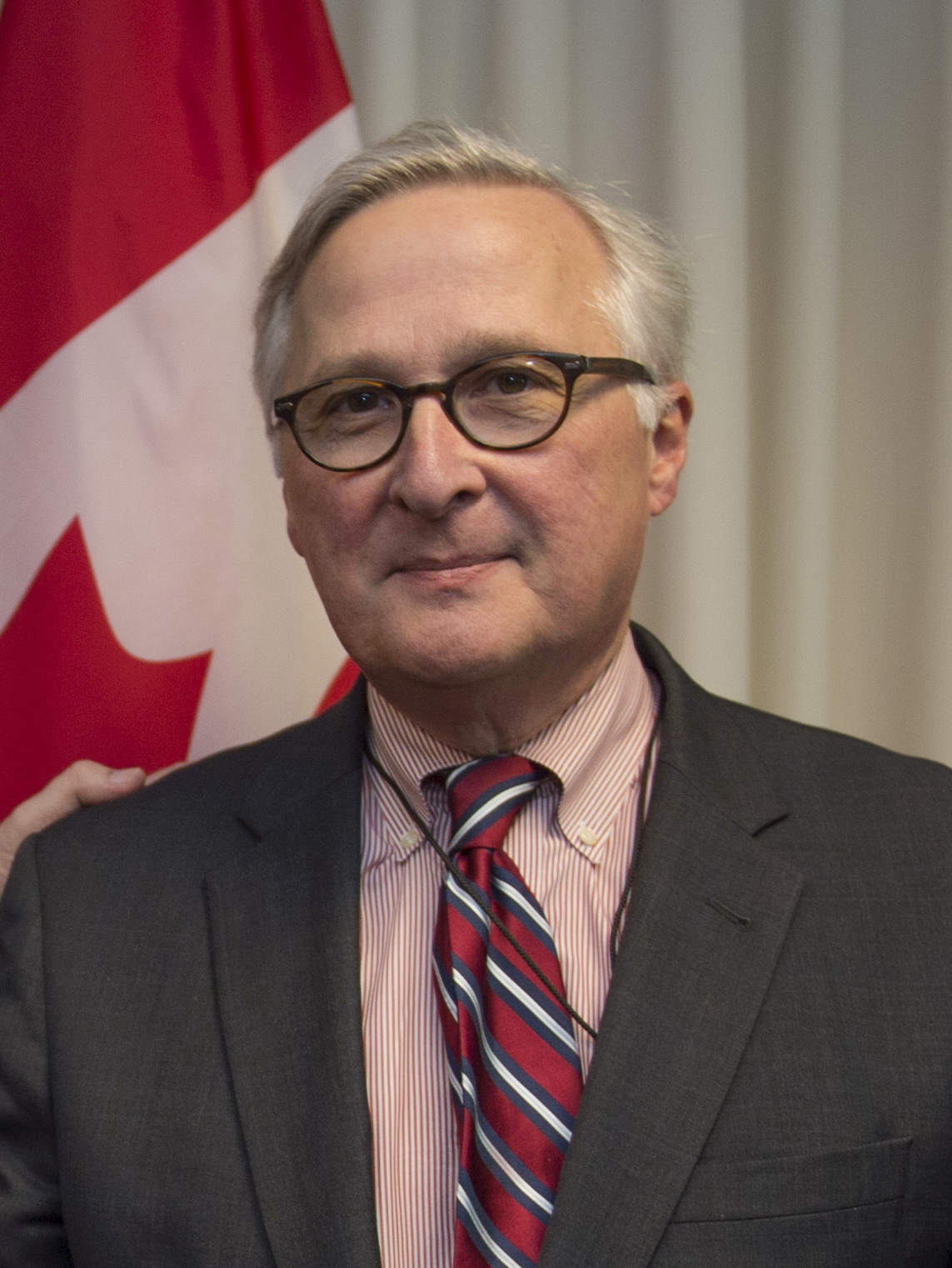
- Fadden in 2014

National Security Advisor to the Prime Minister Associate Secretary to the Cabinet
- In office January 19, 2015 – March 31, 2016
- Prime Minister: Stephen Harper; Justin Trudeau
- Secretary: Janice Charette
- Preceded by: Stephen Rigby
- Succeeded by: Daniel Jean

Deputy Minister of National Defence
- In office May 13, 2013 – January 18, 2015
- Minister: Peter MacKay; Rob Nicholson; Jason Kenney
- Preceded by: Robert Fonberg
- Succeeded by: John Forster

7th Director of the Canadian Security Intelligence Service
- In office June 2009 – May 2013
- Minister: Peter Van Loan; Vic Toews
- Preceded by: Jim Judd
- Succeeded by: Michel Coulombe

Deputy Minister of Citizenship and Immigration
- In office July 1, 2006 – June 27, 2009
- Minister: Monte Solberg; Diane Finley; Jason Kenney
- Preceded by: Janice Charette
- Succeeded by: Neil Yeates

President of the Canadian Food Inspection Agency
- In office 2002–2005
- Minister: Lyle Vanclief; Bob Speller; Andy Mitchell
- Preceded by: Ronald L. Doering
- Succeeded by: François Guimont

Personal details
- Born: September 1951 (age 75)
- Education: McGill University; Université de Montréal; University of Ottawa
- Awards: Order of Canada

Richard Brian Marcel Fadden OC (born September 1951) is a Canadian former civil servant who was the national security advisor to the prime minister of Canada and an associate secretary to the cabinet. He retired from that position on March 31, 2016. He had previously served as the deputy minister for the Department of National Defence from 2013 to 2015. From 2009 to 2013, he was the director of the Canadian Security Intelligence Service (CSIS). He was previously the deputy minister for Citizenship and Immigration Canada from 2006 to 2009.

== Early life and education ==
Born in September 1951, Fadden attended McGill University, earning a Bachelor of Arts in political science, the Université de Montréal where he earned a Bachelor of Laws, and the University of Ottawa, earning a Graduate Diploma in Law.

== Career ==
Fadden spent his career as a civil servant, beginning in 1978 as a Foreign Service Officer in the Department of External Affairs. He moved to the Security and Intelligence Secretariat of the Privy Council Office in 1983. Subsequently, he was Principal Officer with the Auditor General from 1988 and was promoted to legal advisor and assistant Auditor General in the Office of the Auditor General of Canada from 1990 to 1996.

Other postings included:

- Assistant Deputy Minister, Department of Natural Resources, 1996–1998;
- Assistant Secretary to the Treasury Board for Government Operations, 1998–2000;
- Deputy Clerk, Counsel and Security and Intelligence Coordinator, Privy Council Office, 2000–2002;
- President of the Canadian Food Inspection Agency, 2002–2005;
- Deputy Minister of Citizenship and Immigration Canada, 2006–2009.

=== Director of CSIS ===
Fadden served as Director of the Canadian Security Intelligence Service (CSIS) from June 2009, when he replaced Jim Judd, until his abrupt resignation in mid-May 2013.

Fadden made headlines in June 2010 by announcing that foreign countries were both performing industrial esponiage against Canada, and trying to influence Canadian politicians. Fadden went on to say that Cabinet Ministers in two provinces, and several municipal politicians, were influenced by a foreign government when making policy decisions.

Several others have criticized Fadden for his remarks, especially since they were in a CBC National interview released just before the G8 and G20 summits in Ontario; the interview was conducted earlier in the year, after the CBC approached Fadden to repeat statements he had made in a private (albeit videotaped) speech at the Royal Canadian Military Institute. Although no countries were named, the National Post, Globe and Mail, CBC, CTV, and several other Canadian media outlets have speculated that Fadden is referring to China.

In April 2013, it was announced that Fadden would step down from his position on May 13 to become Deputy Minister of National Defence. Deputy Director of Operations Michel Coulombe was designated as Fadden's replacement, in an interim role until a new director is appointed.

=== National Security Adviser ===
Fadden was appointed National Security Adviser in early 2015 by Stephen Harper.

As national security and intelligence adviser, Fadden's "insistence that foreign powers, notably the Chinese Communist Party, had cultivated agents of influence at various levels of government in Canada" hurt his standing with the Liberal Party of Canada, which became the governing party of Canada in late 2015. Fadden was replaced by Daniel Jean, who lacked experience in either national security or intelligence.

Fadden's concerns have since been borne out by a series of revelations, including a Financial Times investigation that cast light on "an internal document prepared by the overseas section of Beijing’s United Front Works Department" that showed how China was influencing electoral politics in foreign countries. Fadden was quoted as saying “What we’re seeing in Australia and New Zealand, I’ve seen no suggestion that [China is] not trying to do the same thing in every other country in the west, Canada included. Their intelligence organizations are fairly active here,” Fadden said. “I refuse to believe they’re not trying to the same thing in France, the U.K. and Germany. It’s just how they try to exert their influence. I’ve seen nothing to suggest we’re insulated from what we’re seeing in Australia and New Zealand."

== Honours ==
In 2017, he was appointed an Officer of the Order of Canada by Governor General David Johnston for "distinguished leadership in the federal public service".
