= Nicole Eaton =

Appointed Senator by Stephen Harper in 2009

The Honourable Nicole Eaton

Canadian Senator from Ontario
- In office January 2, 2009 – January 21, 2020
- Nominated by: Stephen Harper
- Appointed by: Michaëlle Jean
- Succeeded by: Bernadette Clement

Personal details
- Born: Nicole Marie Courtois; January 21, 1945 (age 81)
- Party: Conservative
- Spouse: Thor Eaton (m. 1977; died 2017)

Nicole Marie Eaton (née Courtois; born January 21, 1945) is a Canadian former politician and a Conservative member of the Senate of Canada. A fundraiser for the Conservative Party, she was appointed on the advice of Stephen Harper to the Senate on December 22, 2008, her term starting on January 2, 2009. She was a trustee of the Royal Ontario Museum (ROM) from 1983 to 1989 and a director of the ROM Foundation from 1996 to 2002. She retired from the Senate upon reaching the mandatory retirement age of 75 on January 21, 2020. She served as Speaker Pro Tempore of the Canadian Senate from 2015 until her retirement from the Senate.

In 2011, Eaton called Canada's national symbol, the beaver, a "dentally defective rat", and suggested that the polar bear should replace it in Canadian iconography. She gained further notoriety in 2012 by leading the Conservative government's charge in the Senate against environmental charities, making unsubstantiated accusations that the charities are involved in "influence peddling" and "political manipulation". On October 3, 2014, the day that Canada's involvement in a military mission against ISIS was announced, she tweeted, "The apple does not fall far from the tree. PM Trudeau refused to fight the Nazis in WWII, Stayed home comfortably in Outremont."

On August 26, 2016, Eaton ignited a controversy online when she tweeted that "Bicycles are a luxury, most of us use public transportation or walk. Never seen a bike rider obey traffic laws. They are special." This was in response to the addition of dedicated bike lanes to Bloor Street in downtown Toronto. She later deleted her Twitter account.

== Family ==
She is the daughter of Edmond Jacques Courtois.

Her brother, E. Jacques Courtois Jr, is a convicted insider trader having peddled confidential takeover information while a vice-president in Morgan Stanley's mergers and acquisitions department from 1974 to 1977. Courtois Jr fled to Bogotá, Colombia, where he was a fugitive for several years before pleading guilty to insider trading charges in New York in 1983. In 1984, he was sentenced to six months in prison.

She is the widow of Thor Edgar Eaton (1942–2017) of the Eaton family.
