= Jacques Courtois (lawyer) =

American lawyer

Edmond Jacques Courtois, PC QC (French pronunciation: [ʒak kuʁtwa]; 4 July 1920 – 3 July 1996) was a Canadian lawyer and public official. Courtois was appointed chair of the Security Intelligence Review Committee on 23 December 1992, the third person ever to chair the body responsible for oversight of the Canadian Security Intelligence Service.

Courtois was born in Montreal. During World War II, he served with the Royal Canadian Naval Volunteer Reserve and called to the Quebec bar in 1946. He practised law with the firm of MacDougall, MacFarlane, Scott & Hugessen, which later became Courtois, Clarkson, Parsons & Tétreault, until 1982.

Following his retirement from his law firm, he served on several board including as chair of the educational publishers McGraw-Hill Ryerson. He was also president of CIIT Inc, vice-president of the Bank of Nova Scotia and also of the Canadian Life Assurance Company as well as on several other boards of directors.

He was appointed Queen's Counsel in 1963. Upon being appointed to SIRC, he became a member of the Queen's Privy Council for Canada which entitled him to the honorific "The Honourable".

Courtois was the President of the Montreal Canadiens from 1972 until 1979. He succeeded J. David Molson and was succeeded by Morgan McCammon. He won 5 Stanley Cups with Montreal in 1973, 1976, 1977, 1978, and 1979.

== Family ==
His son, E. Jacques Courtois Jr, is a convicted insider trader having peddled confidential takeover information while a vice-president in Morgan Stanley's mergers and acquisitions department from 1974 to 1977. Courtois Jr fled to Bogotá, Colombia, where he was a fugitive for several years before pleading guilty to insider trading charges in New York in 1983. In 1984 he was sentenced to six months in prison.

His daughter, Nicole Eaton, is a former Canadian senator

His second son, Marc Courtois was the chairman of Canada Post between 2007 and 2014.

Government offices
Preceded by John W. H. Bassett	Chair of the Security Intelligence Review Committee (Canada); 1992–1996	Succeeded by Paule Gauthier

Preceded by David Molson	President of the Montreal Canadiens; 1972–1979	Succeeded by Morgan McCammon
