= Jim Grant (lawyer) =

Canadian politician (1937–2024)

The Honourable Jim Grant PC CM KC
- Born: 1937; Montreal, Quebec, Canada
- Died: November 22, 2024 (aged 87)
- Education: McGill University
- Awards: Order of Canada

James Andrews Grant, PC, CM, KC (1937 – November 22, 2024) was a Canadian lawyer.

== Life and career ==
Grant was born in 1937. He received a B.A. in 1958 and a Bachelor of Civil Law in 1961 from McGill University. He was called to the Bar of Quebec in 1962. He was a partner and Chairman Emeritus of the law firm, Stikeman Elliott LLP. He served on the Board of Directors of CAE Inc. and CIBC.

In 2003 he was president of the Royal Canadian Golf Association. In 1996, he was named to the Security Intelligence Review Committee and was accordingly summoned to the Queen's Privy Council for Canada.

In 2003, he was made a Member of the Order of Canada.

In 2009, he was awarded the James A. Robb Award by the McGill University Faculty of Law.

Grant died on November 22, 2024, at the age of 87.
