= Daniel Jean =

Canadian political consultant

National Security Advisor to the Prime Minister
- In office May 16, 2016 – May 23, 2018
- Prime Minister: Justin Trudeau
- Preceded by: Richard Fadden

Deputy Minister of Foreign Affairs
- In office November 2013 – May 15, 2016

Daniel Jean was the National Security Advisor to the Prime Minister of Canada, Justin Trudeau from May 2016 until May 2018.

== Education ==
Jean possesses a Bachelor of Social Sciences, International Relations and Economics, from the University of Ottawa and a Master of Business Administration from the State University of New York.

== Biography ==
Jean began his career in Canadian government in 1983 and has held various positions since then, including Deputy Minister of Canadian Heritage and Deputy Minister of Foreign Affairs.

While he was Deputy Minister of Foreign Affairs in 2015, Jean was seen to urge government to sign an extradition treaty with China.

=== National Security Advisor ===
Jean became the National Security Advisor (Canada) to Prime Minister Justin Trudeau in May 2016, after Richard Fadden retired from the position.

Several months after his appointment, Jean went to Beijing to talk about an extradition treaty and a "transfer of offenders" treaty.

He assisted in the release of Hyeon Soo Lim from North Korea.

==== Resignation ====
Jean attracted controversy in 2018 when he gave a briefing to journalists on Justin Trudeau's trip to India, in which Jaspal Atwal was invited to an event at the Canadian embassy. Atwal is a Canadian of Indian descent to was convicted of the attempted murder of Malkiat Singh Sidhu in 1986. Jean claimed that the briefing was designed to "counter a false narrative" that CSIS, the RCMP, and the High Commission to India knew of Atwal's invitation in advance but did nothing.

Following the briefing, several media outlets reported that a senior official had alleged that Atwal's presence was the result of a concerted effort to embarrass the Canadian government. The briefing drew criticism from some, including Conservative MP Glen Motz for raising "the conspiracy theory of rogue Indian elements" rather than accepting responsibility for Atwal's invitation.

Within 24 hours, Surrey Centre Liberal MP Randeep Sarai said that he had secured Atwal's invitation, thus giving the lie to Jean, who announced that he would retire as national security advisor in April 2018, stepping down officially on May 22.
