= Arthur Porter (physician) =

Canadian physician and hospital administrator

The Honourable Arthur Porter PC
- Born: June 11, 1956; Freetown, Sierra Leone
- Died: June 30, 2015 (aged 59); Panama
- Occupation: Physician
- Spouse: Pamela Mattock Porter
- Parent: Arthur Porter III

Arthur Thomas Porter IV PC (June 11, 1956 – June 30, 2015) was a Canadian physician and hospital administrator.

In February 2004, Porter was appointed to replace Hugh Scott as the Director General and CEO of the McGill University Health Centre in Montreal, Quebec, one of Canada's largest academic health centres. He left that position in December 2011.

Porter also served as chair of the Canadian Security Intelligence Review Committee, which reviewed the activities of the Canadian Security Intelligence Service, Canada's spy agency. He was appointed to that committee by Prime Minister Stephen Harper on September 3, 2008, and along with that appointment, was made a privy councillor.

On May 27, 2013, Porter was arrested in Panama on fraud charges, which alleged that he took part in a $22.5 million kick-back scheme related to the construction of McGill University Health Centre's new $1.3 billion hospital. The Canadian Broadcasting Corporation called it the biggest fraud investigation in Canadian history. Porter denied any wrongdoing.

Porter composed his memoirs, The Man Behind the Bow Tie: Arthur Porter on Business, Politics and Intrigue, with writer and biographer T. R. Todd, and the book was released on September 12, 2014.

Porter died just before midnight on June 30, 2015, at a cancer hospital in Panama. His death was announced on July 1, 2015.

== Early life and education ==
Porter was born in Sierra Leone. He held both Canadian and American citizenship. He was married to Pamela Mattock Porter and had four children. His mother was Danish. His father, Arthur Porter III, spearheaded the expansion of the University of Nairobi in Kenya during the years when Kenyan President Jomo Kenyatta was in power.

Porter received his early education in Sierra Leone and Kenya. After attending the University of Sierra Leone, he studied in England at the University of Cambridge, including its School of Clinical Medicine. Porter earned his M.B.A. from the University of Tennessee and certificates in medical management from Harvard University and the University of Toronto. He also studied at Western University in London, Ontario. He was bestowed a Fellowship and Diplomate status in Healthcare Administration from the American Academy of Medical Administrators.

== Initial career ==
Following his training in medical and radiation oncology, Porter assumed several senior positions in Canada, including that of senior specialist at the University of Alberta, Chief of Radiation Oncology at the London Regional Cancer Centre (University of Western Ontario), and Chairman of Oncology at Victoria Hospital in London, Ontario.

In 1991, he was appointed Radiation Oncologist-in-chief, professor and chairman of the Detroit Medical Center and Wayne State University. During the subsequent five years, Porter accepted several other concurrent positions, including Director of Clinical Care at the Karmanos Cancer Institute and associate dean at the Wayne State University School of Medicine.

He also founded a cancer clinic in Nassau, in the Commonwealth of the Bahamas, known as the Cancer Centre.

In 1999, Porter was named CEO of the Detroit Medical Center, a US$1.6 billion (~$2.82 billion in 2024) health system, which is one of the United States' largest urban health systems and the biggest non-government employer in Detroit. He resigned from this position in 2003.

In 2001, Porter was appointed to the presidential commission charged with reviewing the health care provided by the Department of Defense and the Veterans Administration.

In August 2002, Michigan Governor John Engler appointed Porter to a four-year term as chairman of Michigan's Hospital Commission.

== McGill University Health Centre ==
In February 2004, Porter was appointed as the Director General and CEO of the McGill University Health Centre in Montreal, Quebec, despite warnings given to McGill University's recruiters in 2003 by the former dean of Wayne State University School of Medicine, John Crissman, as well as articles in the Detroit Free Press revealing his involvement in multiple side businesses. The McGill University Health Centre is one of Canada's largest academic health centres and was engaged in a multibillion-dollar redevelopment project at the time.

On February 12, 2008, Porter, as Director General and CEO of the McGill University Health Centre, announced the launch of the Institute for Strategic Analysis and Innovation website.

Porter completed his second term in December 2011, having handed the academic health centre the largest grant to a single institution from the Canada Foundation for Innovation (nearly $100 million). This was matched by the Quebec government and supported by donors to bring research funding up to $250 million.

== Other professional activities ==
Porter was once president of the American Brachytherapy Society, the American College of Oncology Administrators, the American Cancer Society (Great Lakes); and the American College of Radiation Oncology. He has also served as Chairman of the Board of Chancellors of the American College of Radiation Oncology and on the Board of Scientific Counselors of the National Cancer Institute (USA).

Between 2006 and 2008, Porter served on the Governing Council of the Canadian Institutes of Health Research (CIHR), which oversees government funding for health-related research in Canada. Related to Porter in the Canadian Institutes of Health Research were Michael Fortier, the Minister of Public Works and Government Services, and Tony Clement, the Minister of Health.

In 2008, Porter became a member of the Queen's Privy Council for Canada when Prime Minister Stephen Harper appointed him to Canada's Security Intelligence Review Committee (SIRC). After Porter resigned as chair of the Security Intelligence Review Committee in November 2011, he was subsequently succeeded as chair of the committee by Chuck Strahl.

In 2011, Porter obtained a St Kitts and Nevis diplomatic passport delivered by the prime minister, Denzil Douglas. Porter was in charge of developing cancer treatment facilities on the island.

== Controversy and allegations ==
After the National Post published revelations about his business dealings with international lobbyists and close ties to the president of Sierra Leone, Porter resigned as chairman of the Security Intelligence Review Committee in November 2011, three months before the end of his contract.

Porter's questionable business dealings and foreign connections included his relationship with Ari Ben-Menashe, a Montreal-based businessman and an ex-Israeli international lobbyist and arms dealer, who was arrested and charged in the United States for illegally attempting to sell military transport airplanes to Iran.

Among the suspicious activities reported by the National Post were revelations that Porter had received $22.5 million in consulting fees from SNC-Lavalin prior to awarding the firm a $1.3 billion contract related to the construction of the McGill University Health Centre. These dealings were found to be in violation of the Quebec Health Act, and along with the emergence of other questionable business activities, led to calls for his resignation. The hospital's board of directors initially came out in support of Porter, but he voluntarily resigned on December 5, 2011 in light of mounting media and public pressure.

In November 2012, McGill University filed a lawsuit seeking repayment of $317,154 (~$427,047 in 2024) which he owed the university. The lawsuit indicated that Porter responded to a letter of October 2012 (demanding payment of the outstanding amount within one week) only with a three-line email, and that they had not heard from him since then. Following the controversy over the unpaid loans, McGill University described Porter as "of unknown address", with McGill's suit indicating that he gave his current addresses as post office boxes in the Bahamas and in Sierra Leone.

Further investigation of the case by the Charbonneau Commission on corruption in the Quebec construction industry resulted in allegations of involvement with SNC Lavilin and health centre employees in fraud and forgery. The investigators then issued a warrant for Porter's arrest on February 27, 2013 on charges of fraud, conspiracy, breach of trust, taking secret commissions, and money laundering. Porter had by that point left Canada, and was apprehended by INTERPOL agents with his wife in Panama, where he remained imprisoned awaiting extradition to Canada.

The National Post reported in November 2012 that Porter was receiving treatment for a "self-diagnosed" cancer in the cancer centre that he had established in the Bahamas and of which he was the managing director. It also gave a link to a story in the Turks and Caicos Magazine, which refers to his establishing cancer centres both in the Turks and Caicos and Bahamas in conjunction with his long-time friend and business partner Karol Sikora, who is Director of Medical Oncology at the Bahamas Cancer Centre, in addition to their mutual cancer-business interests in the British Isles.

== Criminal charges and arrest ==
On 27 February 2013, an arrest warrant was issued in relation to the McGill University Health Centre scandal.

Porter and his wife, Pamela Mattock Porter, were detained by Interpol agents in Panama on May 27, 2013, after an investigation by the Sûreté du Québec, the Royal Canadian Mounted Police and the International Criminal Police Organization (Interpol). He faced charges in Canada of fraud, conspiracy to commit government fraud, abuse of trust, secret commissions and laundering the proceeds of a crime. Porter's wife faced charges of laundering the proceeds of a crime and for conspiracy.

The fraud against the Québec government related to his alleged role in the awarding of the $1.3-billion Montreal hospital construction and maintenance contract to SNC Lavalin. The contract was awarded to SNC-Lavalin, the engineering giant deeply involved in the Québec corruption scandal.

At the time of the alleged fraud, from 2008 to 2011, Porter was the CEO of the McGill University Health Centre in Montreal, Quebec, being in charge of one of Canada's largest health-care providers. He was appointed to that position in 2004. He was also a member of Air Canada's board of directors.

== Extradition proceedings ==
Porter and his wife (Mattock) opposed extradition from Panama to Canada. Porter was claiming diplomatic immunity on the basis that he was travelling via Panama on a diplomatic mission to Antigua and Barbuda, on behalf of the government of Sierra Leone, according to his lawyer Ricardo Bilonick Paredes (formerly known as Ricardo Bilonick), a convicted drug smuggler with ties to Panama's former dictator, Manuel Noriega and Colombian cartels. However, the Sierra Leone government said that he was a goodwill ambassador and thus had no diplomatic immunity. On June 4, 2015, while Porter was still in La Joya jail fighting extradition to Canada, he set up a company, BQ Holding with the help of his lawyer, Ricardo Bilonick Paredes, who was listed as president. Bilonick Paredes passed millions of dollars in bribes to deposed Panamanian leader Manuel Noriega in the 1980s in exchange for the ability to fly planes packed with tons of cocaine from Panama to the United States. Bilonick netted $47 million for providing drug smuggling and money laundering services over a four-year period.

More than a year after his arrest, while still in prison, Porter filed a $150 million lawsuit against the Republic of Panama, claiming damages incurred from his arrest and imprisonment in the country. That suit cited Panamanian Law 2502, which states that if a person being sought for extradition does not face a hearing within 60 days of their detention, they are to be freed. He also complained to the United Nations that his human rights had been violated.

In August 2013, Mattock was extradited to Canada. She posted a $250,000 bail in Montreal. Under her bail conditions, she was restricted from leaving Quebec and having any contact with her husband.

Mattock turned herself in to police in September 2014 on charges of using the proceeds of crime to achieve her $250,000 (~$325,347 in 2024) bail. She decided not to re-post bail in the hopes of receiving a quicker trial date. On December 18, 2014, Mattock pleaded guilty to two counts of money laundering and received a 33-month sentence, less time served. As a result of this plea, she will not have to serve time in a federal penitentiary, and she will likely be released in 2015.

On January 17, 2015, it was announced that Canada and Panama had come to an agreement on Porter's extradition. However, no date was set.

After Porter's death in June 2015, lingering questions remained about the Canadian government's genuine willingness to bring Porter back to face the charges. An article by the Canadian Broadcasting Corporation, on July 2, 2015, noted that Panama ignored its own extradition laws, and Canada did not press to have his case handled quickly. The case has sparked questions as to what secrets Porter may have taken to his grave.

== Writings and film ==
Porter wrote a memoir with Canadian biographer T. R. Todd about his rise and fall, entitled The Man Behind the Bow Tie: Arthur Porter on Business, Politics and Intrigue. It was published by Figure 1 Publishing in September 2014 and distributed by Raincoast Books.

On 8 July 2014, Quill & Quire announced that Porter's memoir was optioned for film and television by a Montreal-based production company.

== Illness and death ==
Porter diagnosed himself with cancer at his clinic in the Bahamas in December 2012. Despite a prognosis of around six to eight months, he fought lung cancer, which spread to his bones and liver, for two-and-a-half years. Porter was aided by his expertise as an oncologist and access to cutting-edge drugs due to his connections in the medical world.

Approximately two of those years were spent in La Joya prison, where Porter had drugs smuggled into the prison. He also self-medicated with an oxygen tank and other medical supplies.

Six weeks before his death, Porter was transferred to the Panama National Cancer Centre. He died there while still in Panamanian custody on June 30, 2015. His death was first announced by his doctors, his family and his biographer.

Porter's death was widely covered by the media in Canada and the United States, and it brought to an end speculation that he faked his illness. Even after the announcement, skepticism remained as to whether he was actually dead. Despite his position as a privy councillor, the Canadian Prime Minister's Office did not issue a comment on his death and refused to lower the flag on Parliament Hill.

On July 2, 2015, Quebec's anti-corruption squad (UPAC) sent two investigators to Panama to view the body. Five days later, the squad was granted access to the Panama City Morgue and viewed the body. It also conducted finger printing and DNA testing. He was declared officially dead on July 7, 2015.

In his memoir, he expressed a desire to be buried in Sierra Leone, although no funeral plans were publicly announced by the family.
