= Security Intelligence Review Committee =

Canadian governmental committee

- Comité de surveillance des activités de renseignement de sécurité

Committee overview
- Formed: July 16, 1984
- Dissolved: July 12, 2019
- Superseding Committee: National Security and Intelligence Review Agency
- Jurisdiction: Government of Canada
- Headquarters: Ottawa, Ontario, Canada
- Parent department: Queen's Privy Council for Canada
- Website: www.sirc-csars.gc.ca

The Security Intelligence Review Committee (SIRC; French: Comité de surveillance des activités de renseignement de sécurité) was a committee of Privy Councillors that was empowered to serve as an independent oversight and review body for the operations of the Canadian Security Intelligence Service (CSIS). The SIRC was established in 1984 as a result of the reorganization of Canadian intelligence agencies recommended by the McDonald Commission investigating the illegal activities of the former RCMP Security Service.

SIRC's role was to review the activities of CSIS to ensure that the extraordinary powers granted to the security service are "used legally and appropriately, in order to protect Canadians’ rights and freedoms." SIRC did not report to a minister but rather reported directly to the Parliament of Canada.

In 2012, the government of Canada abolished the role of CSIS inspector-general and gave its responsibilities to the SIRC, saying it would save money and prevent duplication, to the dismay of the last inspector-general Eva Plunkett.

On July 19, 2019, SIRC was superseded by the National Security and Intelligence Review Agency (NSIRA), a super-agency mandated to review all Government of Canada national security and intelligence activities.

== Chuck Strahl (2012–2014) lobbying activities ==
In January 2014, Chuck Strahl resigned his position as chair of the Security Intelligence Review Committee, the watchdog of Canada's spy agency, after it was revealed by the press that he is also registered as a lobbyist over the Enbridge Northern Gateway Pipelines.

== Arthur Porter (2008–2011) criminal charges and arrest ==
Arthur Porter and his wife, Pamela Mattock Porter were detained by Interpol agents in Panama on May 27, 2013, after an investigation by the Sureté du Québec, the Royal Canadian Mounted Police and the International Criminal Police Organization (Interpol). He faced charges in Canada of fraud, conspiracy to commit government fraud, abuse of trust, secret commissions and laundering the proceeds of a crime.

The fraud against the Quebec government is related to his alleged role in the handling of a $1.3-billion Montreal hospital construction and maintenance contract. At the time of the alleged fraud, from 2008 to 2011, Porter director general of the McGill University Health Centre in Montreal, Quebec, being in charge of one of Canada's largest health-care providers. He was appointed to the position in 2004. He was also a member of Air Canada’s board of directors.

Porter claimed diplomatic immunity on the basis that he was travelling via Panama on a diplomatic mission to Antigua and Barbuda, on behalf of the government of Sierra Leone, according to his lawyer Ricardo Bilonick Paredes (formerly known as Ricardo Bilonick), a convicted cocaine smuggler with ties to Panama's former dictator, Manuel Noriega and Colombian drug cartels. However, the Sierra Leone government stated that he was a goodwill ambassador and thus has no diplomatic immunity.

== Air India bombing ==
In 2005, SIRC came under criticism for allegedly not giving close enough scrutiny to the activities of CSIS regarding the Air India bombing, where crucial wiretap evidence was destroyed putting the legal case against the alleged Air India bombers into jeopardy. The Security Intelligence Review Committee cleared CSIS of any wrongdoing. The report remains secret to this day.

== Past chairs of SIRC ==
- Ron Atkey (1984–1989)
- John W. H. Bassett (1989–1992)
- Jacques Courtois (1992–1996)
- Paule Gauthier (1996–2005)
- Gary Filmon (2005–2010)
- Arthur Porter (2010–2011)(Resigned on November 10, 2011)
- Carol Skelton (Acting, 2011–2012)
- Chuck Strahl (2012 - 24 January 2014) (Resigned in January 2014)
- Deborah Grey (Acting)
- Pierre Blais (May 1, 2015 -)

== Historical membership of SIRC ==
Source: SIRC

=== Appointed November 30, 1984 ===
Chair:

Hon. Ronald G. Atkey, PC, QC (five years)

Members:

Hon. Frank Charles McGee, PC (five years)

Hon. Jean Jacques Blais, PC, QC (five years)

Hon. Saul M. Cherniack, PC, QC (five years)

Hon. Paule Gauthier, PC, OC, OQ, QC (five years)

=== Appointed November 30, 1989 ===
Chair:

Hon. John W.H. Bassett, PC, OC (three years)

Members:

Hon. Stewart D. McInnes, PC, QC (three years)

Hon. Jean Jacques Blais, PC, QC (two years)

Hon. Saul M. Cherniack, PC, QC (two years)

Hon. Paule Gauthier, PC, OC, OQ, QC (two years)

=== Appointed November 30, 1991 ===
Member:

Hon. Saul M. Cherniack, PC, QC (one year)

=== Appointed December 5, 1991 ===
Members:

Hon. Michel Robert, PC, QC (five years)* *Appointed to the Bench, May 1995

Hon. Jacques Courtois, PC, QC (five years)

=== Appointed November 30, 1992 ===
Member:

Hon. Edwin A. Goodman, PC, OC, QC (five years)

=== Appointed December 23, 1992 ===
Chair:

Hon. Jacques Courtois, PC, QC (five years)

Member:

Hon. George Vari, PC, OC (five years)

=== Appointed April 20, 1993 ===
Member:

Hon. Rosemary Brown, PC, OC (five years)

=== Appointed June 8, 1995 ===
Member:

Hon. Paule Gauthier, PC, OC, OQ, QC (five years)

=== Appointed September 30, 1996 ===
Chair:

Hon. Paule Gauthier, PC, OC, OQ, QC (to June 7, 2000)

Member:

Hon. James Andrews Grant, PC, QC (five years)

=== Appointed April 30, 1998 ===
Member:

Hon. Bob Rae, PC, OC, O.Ont, QC (five years)

=== Appointed June 9, 1999 ===
Members:

Hon. Raymond Speaker, PC, OC (five years)

Hon. Frank McKenna, PC, OC, QC, ONB (five years)

=== Appointed June 8, 2000 ===
Chair:

Hon. Paule Gauthier, PC, OC, OQ, QC (five years)

=== Appointed October 4, 2001 ===
Member:

Hon. Gary Filmon, PC, OM (five years)

=== Appointed February 20, 2003 ===
Member:

Hon. Baljit S. Chadha, PC (five years)

=== November 13, 2003 ===
Member:

Hon. Roy Romanow, PC, OC, SOM, QC (five years)

=== Appointed September 16, 2004 ===
Member:

Hon. Raymond Speaker, PC, OC (five years)

=== Appointed June 24, 2005 ===
Chair:

Gary Filmon, PC, OM (five years)

Member:

Aldea Landry, PC, CM, QC (five years)

=== Appointed September 3, 2008 ===
Members:

Hon. Denis Losier, PC

Hon. Arthur Porter, PC (five years), (resigned November 10, 2011)

It is noteworthy to remark that 8 months after the appointment of Arthur Porter, the CSIS Director Jim Judd announced his early resignation from his post.

=== Appointed January 23, 2009 ===
Member:

Hon. Frances Lankin, PC

=== Appointed June 24, 2010 ===
Chair:

Hon. Arthur Porter, PC (resigned November 10, 2011)

Members:

Hon. Philippe Couillard, PC

Hon. Carol Skelton, PC

=== Appointed June 14, 2012 ===
Chair:

Hon. Chuck Strahl, PC (resigned January 2014)

=== Appointed April 22, 2013 ===
Member:

Hon. Deborah Grey, PC, OC (resigned May 2, 2015)

=== Appointed August 8, 2013 ===
Member:

Hon. Yves Fortier, PC, CC, OQ, QC

=== Appointed March 7, 2014 ===
Member:

Hon. Gene McLean, PC

=== Appointed January 30, 2015 ===
Member:

Hon. Ian Carl Holloway, PC, CD, QC

=== Appointed May 1, 2015 ===
Chair:

Hon. Pierre Blais, PC

Member:

Hon. Marie-Lucie Morin, PC

== See also ==
- National Security and Intelligence Review Agency
- National Security and Intelligence Committee of Parliamentarians
- Royal Commission of Inquiry into Certain Activities of the RCMP
- Communications Security Establishment Canada
- Intelligence and Security Committee of Parliament
