= Pierre Boivin =

Canadian businessman

Pierre Boivin CC CQ

21st Chancellor of McGill University
- Incumbent
- Assumed office July 9, 2024
- Preceded by: John McCall MacBain

Personal details
- Born: October 28, 1953 (age 72)
- Occupation: President of the Montreal Canadiens (1999–2011)

Pierre Boivin CC CQ (born October 28, 1953) is a Canadian businessman and was president of the Montreal Canadiens from September 2, 1999, through June 30, 2011, succeeding Ronald Corey. On July 9, 2024, he succeeded John McCall MacBain as chancellor of McGill University.

== Business ==
At the age of 25, Boivin founded Norvinca Sports. It would become the largest sporting goods distributor in Canada. In later years, he would become the chief executive officer for Canstar Inc. The company owned the Cooper and Bauer sports equipment brands.

== Sports ==
Prior to the beginning of the 1999–2000 Montreal Canadiens season, Boivin was named as the new president of the Montreal Canadiens. One of his first key moves was during the 2000–01 Montreal Canadiens season, when he fired general manager Rejean Houle and head coach Alain Vigneault in November 2000.

Boivin resigned as the president of the Montreal Canadiens on June 30, 2011, being succeeded by Geoff Molson, majority co-owner of the club. Boivin has remained with the organization as a member of the board of directors.

On February 12, 2019, Boivin was registered as a lobbyist in Quebec with the goal of negotiating the sale of the Peel Basin to private buyers on behalf of a Montreal-based group headed by Stephen Bronfman. The group's goal is to bring back an MLB team to the city of Montreal.

== Politics ==
Boivin starred in a public service announcement for the Canada 2006 Census. In 2009, he was made an Officer of the Order of Canada "for the leadership he has demonstrated as an entrepreneur and administrator in the sports industry, and for the work he has done to help develop community and philanthropic activities". He was promoted to the rank of Companion within the Order in 2024.

== Personal life ==
Pierre is married to Lucie Nadeau and is the father of three children: Patrick, Catherine, and Richard. Boivin is a distant cousin of Patrick LaForge, the former president and CEO of the Edmonton Oilers. His son Patrick was president of the Montreal Alouettes.

Preceded by Ronald Corey	President of the Montreal Canadiens; 1999–2011	Succeeded by Geoff Molson
