= Morgan McCammon =

Canadian ice hockey lawyer and businessman

- Born: September 20, 1922; Montreal, Quebec, Canada
- Died: November 20, 1999 (aged 77)
- Education: McGill University
- Occupation(s): lawyer, businessman

Morgan McCammon (September 20, 1922 – November 20, 1999) was a Canadian lawyer and businessman.

Born in Montreal, Quebec, McCammon started studying at McGill University in 1940. He did not complete his education, instead joining the Canadian Army during World War II with the Princess Patricia's Canadian Light Infantry. After the war, he continued his education, receiving a law degree in 1949. He worked for four years as a lawyer with the law firm of Brais-Campbell before joining Steinberg's real-estate business in 1953. He joined Molson Breweries in 1958, eventually becoming president and chairman.

In the summer of 1978, McCammon joined the Montreal Canadiens. McCammon's name was engraved on the Stanley Cup as a director in 1979. Following the 1979 Stanley Cup win, Morgan McCammon replaced Jacques Courtois as president, later being succeeded by Ronald Corey in 1982. McCammon then served as chairman of the board from 1982 to 1986. He won a second ring with Montreal in 1986, but his name was not engraved on the Stanley Cup.

Preceded by Jacques Courtois	President of the Montreal Canadiens; 1979–1982	Succeeded by Ronald Corey
