= J. David Molson =

Canadian ice hockey executive (1928–2017)

John David Molson

President of the Montreal Canadiens
- In office 1964–1972
- Preceded by: Hartland Molson
- Succeeded by: Jacques Courtois

Personal details
- Born: June 1, 1928
- Died: May 8, 2017 (aged 88)
- Occupation: Businessman; sports executive

John David Molson (June 1, 1928 – May 8, 2017) was a Canadian businessman and sports executive. A member of the Molson family, he served as the president of the Montreal Canadiens for eight years.

== Biography ==
Molson, known as David, was born June 1, 1928, to John Henry Molson and Florence Hazel Browne. Educated in Montreal and then in Brussels (1948–1950), he joined Molson Breweries Limited in 1949. He worked for the company for several years and became a vice-president in January 1964.

=== Montreal Canadiens ===
During the 1963–64 NHL season, his cousin, Hartland Molson, who purchased the team in 1957, offered him the post of president of the Montreal Canadiens. Four years later, David and his brothers, Bill and Peter, acquired the team from their cousins. David continued as team president until 1972 when he and his brothers sold the team to Edward and Peter Bronfman for $15 million. During his tenure, the Canadiens won 5 Stanley Cups: in 1965, 1966, 1968, 1969, and 1971.

== Personal life ==
Molson married Claire Faulkner in 1955 with whom he had two sons (John Henry and David Hugh) and one daughter (Catherine Elizabeth).

Molson died on May 8, 2017, at the age of 88.

Preceded by Hartland Molson	President of the Montreal Canadiens; 1964–1972	Succeeded by Jacques Courtois
