= Ted Finn =

First director of the Canadian Security Intelligence Service

Thomas D'Arcy "Ted" Finn (July 5, 1939 – December 20, 2007) was the first director of the Canadian Security Intelligence Service (CSIS), serving from 1984 until 1987. He resigned after it was revealed that CSIS had filed an "inaccurate and misleading" affidavit to acquire a warrant for a wiretap.

Finn was born in Ottawa and grew up in the Sandy Hill neighbourhood. He attended Lisgar Collegiate Institute and then received a law degree from the University of Ottawa. Finn was called to the bar in 1967, working as a criminal lawyer and assistant Crown prosecutor before serving as assistant secretary to the federal cabinet for security and intelligence matters during the 1970s.

Finn was Director when 156 wiretaps related to the Air India bombing were erased. Justice Ian Josephson described the erasures as "unacceptable negligence". Of the 210 related wiretaps that were recorded by CSIS, 156 were erased. These tapes continued to be erased according to CSIS policy even after the alleged terrorists had become the primary suspects in the bombing. CSIS claims the wiretaps contained no relevant information. A memo from the Royal Canadian Mounted Police (RCMP) disputes this, stating that "There is a strong likelihood that had CSIS retained the tapes between March and August 1985, that a successful prosecution of at least some of the principals in both bombings could have been undertaken."

Finn resigned as Director of CSIS in 1987, accepting responsibility for the court-filing of an error-ridden and unsubstantiated affidavit in support of a wiretap in relation to the attempted murder of Malkiat Singh Sidhu.

After his resignation, he returned to private practice.
