= Ronald Corey =

National Hockey League executive

- Born: 13 December 1938 (age 86); Montreal, Quebec, Canada
- Awards: Order of Canada

Ronald Corey, CM (born 13 December 1938) is a Canadian businessman and former professional ice hockey executive with the Montreal Canadiens of the National Hockey League (NHL). In 1991, he was made a Member of the Order of Canada.

== Businessman ==
As of 2012, Corey serves as director of Transamerica Life Companies, Schiff Nutrition International Inc. and The Canadian Museum for Human Rights. He is also president of Ronald Corey Groupe Conseil Ltée. Corey has also served as Chairman of the Port of Montreal. Prior to joining the Canadiens' organization, Corey was president of the Carling-O'Keefe brewery.

== Montreal Canadiens executive ==
On November 12, 1982, Corey was appointed president of the Canadiens. During his term as president, the team won two Stanley Cups in 1986 and 1993. Corey was president for the building of the Bell Centre, however during the 1990s, the team's business declined under the indirect ownership of parent company Molson Brewery by Foster's.

In 1986, he brought Doug Harvey back into the Canadiens' organization as a scout, and arranged the retirement of his jersey number 2. He was also criticized by the media for poor management decisions in the hiring of Montreal Canadiens general managers. One famous action of Corey's was the firing, four games into the 1995–96 season, of the entire Canadiens' hockey management - general manager Serge Savard and coaches Jacques Demers, Carol Vadnais and Andre Boudrias, and replacing them with Rejean Houle and Mario Tremblay. Houle had no previous general manager experience while Tremblay had no coaching experience, and the moves would indirectly lead to the departure of star goaltender Patrick Roy weeks later. Earlier, however, Savard had been hired by Corey with no prior front-office experience and went on to put together 2 Stanley Cup-winning teams. Corey retired in May 1999, after Molson openly discussed selling the team, he was unwilling and unable to fulfill that mandate, and Molson went on to install new team president Pierre Boivin. The Canadiens were soon sold to American businessman George Gillett.

Business positions
Preceded by Morgan McCammon	President of the Montreal Canadiens; 1982–1999	Succeeded by Pierre Boivin
