= Securing an Open Society: Canada's National Security Policy =

Securing an Open Society: Canada's National Security Policy was released to the public during a session in Parliament on 27 April 2004 by Anne McLellan, who then occupied the role of Deputy Prime Minister.
