= Ray Protti =

Canadian civil servant (born 1945)

- Born: 7 December 1945 (age 80); Edmonton, Alberta
- Education: University of Alberta (BA '68, MA '70)
- Spouse: Sheila Dobson (m. 1970)

Raymond Joseph Protti (born 7 December 1945) is a University of Alberta graduate with a BA and MA in economics. Protti was the director of the Canadian Security Intelligence Service (CSIS) from 1992 through 1994. He previously held positions as President and CEO of the Canadian Bankers Association, and Deputy Minister of Agriculture and Agri-food and of Labour Canada.
