= Canadian Security Intelligence Service =

Intelligence agency

- Service canadien du renseignement de sécurité

Agency overview
- Formed: July 16, 1984; 42 years ago
- Preceding agency: RCMP Security Service
- Jurisdiction: Government of Canada
- Headquarters: Ottawa, Ontario, Canada; 45.4374°N 75.6139°W
- Motto: A safe, secure and prosperous Canada, through trusted intelligence and advice.
- Employees: 3,200+ (2020)
- Annual budget: $702.6 million (2024–25)
- Minister responsible: Gary Anandasangaree, Minister of Public Safety
- Agency executive: Daniel Rogers, Director
- Parent department: Public Safety Canada
- Website: www.canada.ca/en/security-intelligence-service.html

The Canadian Security Intelligence Service (CSIS; /ˈsiːsɪs/; French: Service canadien du renseignement de sécurité; SCRS) is an intelligence service and security agency of the Government of Canada. It is responsible for gathering, processing, and analyzing national security information from around the world and conducting covert action within Canada and abroad. CSIS reports to the minister of public safety, and is subject to review by the National Security and Intelligence Review Agency.

The CSIS has no law enforcement function and mainly focuses on intelligence gathering. The agency is led by a director, currently Daniel Rogers, who assumed the role on October 15, 2024.

== History ==
Prior to 1984, security intelligence in Canada was the purview of the Royal Canadian Mounted Police (RCMP). However, during the 1970s, there were allegations that the RCMP Security Service – the predecessor to CSIS – had been involved in numerous illegal activities. As a result of these allegations, Justice David McDonald was appointed in 1977 to investigate the activities of the RCMP Security Service. The resulting investigation, known as the McDonald Commission, published its final report in 1981, with its main recommendation being that security intelligence work should be separated from policing, and that a civilian intelligence agency be created to take over from the RCMP Security Service.

On June 21, 1984, CSIS was created by an Act of Parliament. At the time, it was also decided that the activities of this new agency, the Canadian Security Intelligence Service, should be subject to both judicial approval for warrants and to general review by a new body, the Security Intelligence Review Committee, as well as the office of the Inspector General (which was disbanded in 2012). Its de facto existence began on July 16 under the direction of Thomas D'Arcy Finn. In its early years, its primary focus was on investigating terrorist groups in response to a number of violent crimes with political undertones, such as the bombing of Air India Flight 182 and the armed takeover of the Turkish embassy in Ottawa.

At first, the main emphasis of CSIS was combatting the activities of various foreign intelligence agencies operating in Canada. For example, it has been engaged in investigating economic espionage involving Chinese operations throughout Canada. While the threat posed by foreign intelligence agencies still remains, CSIS over the years since 9/11 has focused more and more on the threat to Canadian security and its citizens posed by terrorist activity, and this has led to the memorable cases of Maher Arar and Omar Khadr.

The institutional focus of CSIS returned to state actors (such as Russia and China) after a February 2021 speech by the CSIS director, David Vigneault, who warned that the Chinese "strategy for geopolitical advantage on all fronts — economic, technological, political and military" uses "all elements of state power to carry out activities that are a direct threat to our national security and sovereignty." Meanwhile, in May 2023, according to a CSIS intelligence assessment which provided an overview of Chinese government foreign interference in Canada, it was claimed that China sees Canada as a "high-priority target" and employs "incentives and punishment" as part of a vast influence network directed at legislators, business executives and diaspora communities.

In 2024, the Parliament of Canada passed the Countering Foreign Interference Act, which amended the Canadian Security Intelligence Service Act to give CSIS powers to investigate potential foreign interference in the Canadian political system.

On November 12, 2026, it is reported that $6 billion in new funding could allow CSIS to expand its mandate to be involved in monitoring foreign intelligence.

=== Leadership ===
The leadership position is mostly a political appointment.

Coulombe, Yaworski, Lloyd, and Rogers were promoted from the ranks within CSIS. Vigneault had held a management posting with CSIS. Neufeld had joined CSIS in 1984 after being in the RCMP.

Finn was previously assistant secretary to the federal cabinet for security and intelligence matters in the 1970s.

Neufeld (RCMP) and Vigneault (CBSA, CSE) have law enforcement backgrounds.

1. Ted Finn 1984–1987
2. Reid Morden 1988–1992
3. Ray Protti 1992–1994
4. Ward Elcock 1994–2004
5. Dale Neufeld (interim director) May–November 2004
6. Jim Judd 2004–2009
7. Richard Fadden 2009–2013
8. Michel Coulombe 2013–2017
9. David Vigneault (Note: Deputy director Jeffrey Yaworski briefly served as interim director for a few weeks following Coulombe's departure, but the agency considers Vigneault to be its ninth director.) 2017–2024
10. Vanessa Lloyd (interim director) July–October 2024
11. Daniel Rogers 2024–present

== Insignia ==
CSIS is one of several federal agencies (primarily those involved with law enforcement, security, or having a regulatory function) that have been granted a heraldic badge. The badge was created in July 1984 (pre-dating the creation of the Canadian Heraldic Authority). The badge received royal approval in June 1985.

On December 21, 2016, a CSIS flag was raised for the first time by the director at the national headquarters. The flag displays the CSIS badge on a white field.

In the book, The Mosaic Effect, co-authors, former Canadian Military Security Intelligence Analyst, Scott McGregor and Journalist Ina Mitchell revealed that employees' internal nickname for CSIS is "the Sisters."

== Mission and operations ==
CSIS is a federal national security agency which conducts national security investigations and security intelligence collection. CSIS collects and analyzes intelligence, then advises the Government of Canada on issues and activities that may threaten the security of Canada and its citizens. These threats include terrorism, espionage and foreign interference in Canadian affairs, proliferation of weapons of mass destruction, and information security threats. The agency is also responsible for the security screening program.

There is no restriction in the Canadian Security Intelligence Service Act on where CSIS may collect "security intelligence" or information relating to threats to the security of Canada. The Service can collect three sorts of datasets: a publicly available dataset, a dataset which belongs to an approved class which is defined by the Minister, and a dataset that "predominantly relates to non-Canadians who are outside Canada."

There is a distinction between "security intelligence" and "foreign intelligence". Security intelligence pertains to national security threats (e.g., terrorism, espionage). Foreign intelligence involves information collection relating to the political or economic activities of foreign states. Previous law stated that CSIS was only allowed to collect this intelligence within Canada but due to an updated law in 2016 they are now allowed to collect that intelligence abroad as well.

CSIS has served in many different countries, especially after 9/11. Examples of some of the countries they have served in are: Afghanistan, Iraq, Syria, Lebanon, Mali, Libya, Sudan, Pakistan, Somalia, Qatar, Kuwait and the United Arab Emirates.

CSIS is neither a police agency nor is it a part of the military. As a civilian intelligence agency, the primary role of CSIS is not law enforcement. Investigation of criminal activity is left to the RCMP and local (provincial, regional or municipal) police agencies. CSIS, like counterparts such as the UK Security Service (MI5) and the US Central Intelligence Agency (CIA), is a civilian agency. CSIS is subject to review by the National Security and Intelligence Review Agency (NSIRA) as well as other legislative checks and balances. The agency carries out its functions in accordance with the Canadian Security Intelligence Service Act, which governs and defines its powers and activities.

Canadian police, military agencies (Canadian Forces Intelligence Branch), and numerous other government departments may maintain their own "intelligence" components (i.e. to analyze criminal intelligence or military strategic intelligence). Global Affairs Canada maintains a Security and Intelligence Bureau to review and analyze overtly acquired information. The bureau plays a coordinating and policy role. While not an intelligence agency, it is responsible for the security of Global Affairs Canada personnel around the world. However, these agencies are not to be confused with the more encompassing work of larger, more dedicated "intelligence agencies" such as CSIS, MI5, MI6, or the CIA.

As Canada's contributor of human intelligence to the Five Eyes, CSIS works closely with the intelligence agencies of the United States, United Kingdom, Australia, and New Zealand. Under the post-World War II Quadripartite (UKUSA) Agreement, intelligence information is shared between the intelligence agencies of these five countries.

CSIS was named one of "Canada's Top 100 Employers" by Mediacorp Canada Inc. for the years of 2009–2011, and was featured in Maclean's newsmagazine.

== Organization ==
=== Regional ===
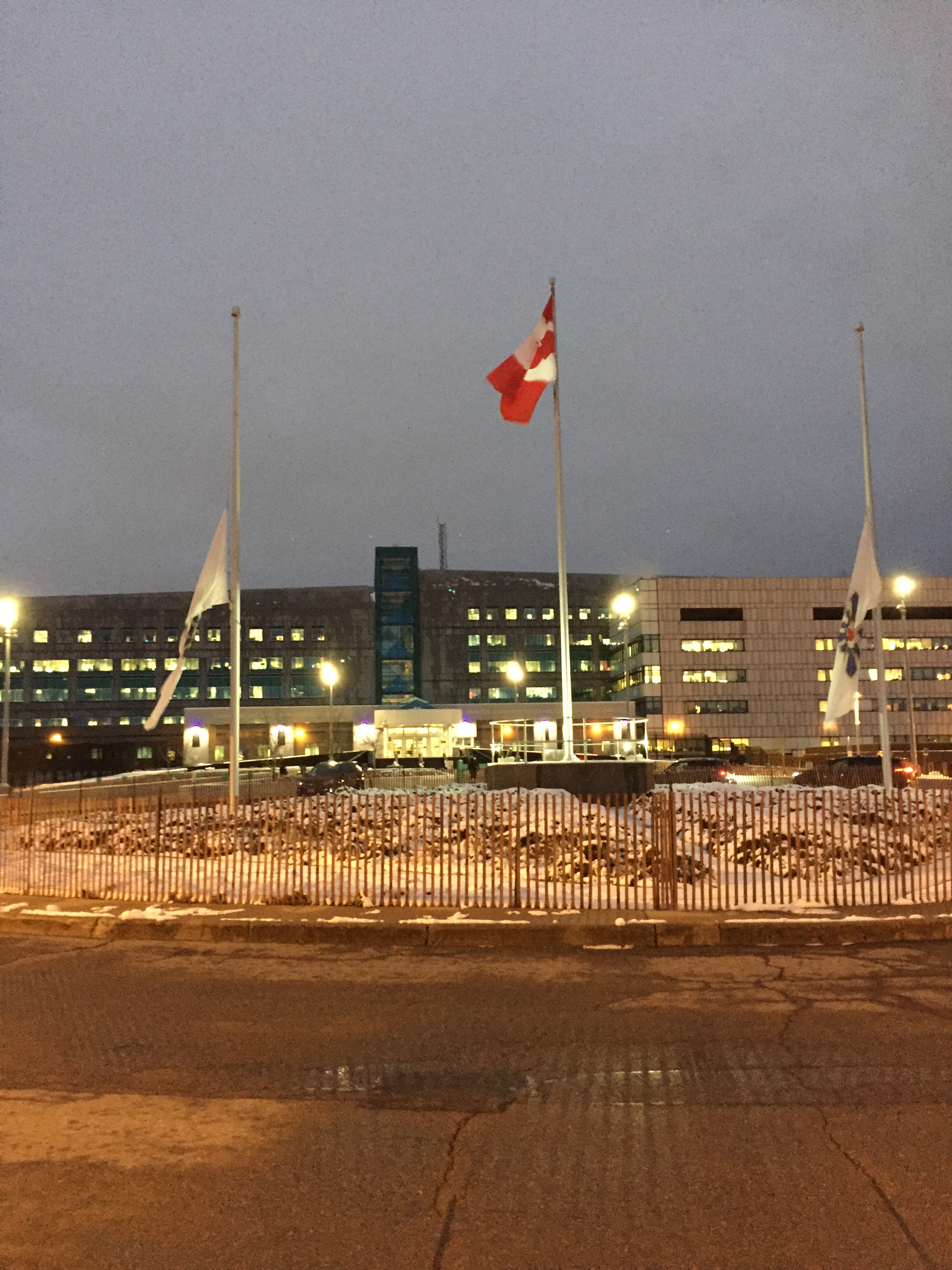
Front view of CSIS HQ in Ottawa

CSIS headquarters is located in Ottawa, Ontario and is responsible for the overall operations. Regionally, Canada is broken down into six subordinate regions; the Atlantic, Quebec, Ottawa, Toronto, Prairie, and British Columbia Regions.

These regions are responsible for investigating any threat to Canada and its allies as defined by the Canadian Security Intelligence Service Act. They liaise with the various federal, provincial, municipal and private sector entities found within their areas of responsibility. They also conduct various outreach programs with different community and cultural groups, universities, and private sector organizations in an effort to provide a better understanding, and to clear up any misunderstandings of the role of CSIS. All these regions also border the US and they therefore maintain contact with their US federal counterparts.

==== Atlantic Region ====
The Atlantic Region encompasses the four Atlantic provinces (Nova Scotia, New Brunswick, Newfoundland and Labrador, and Prince Edward Island) and is the smallest of the six CSIS regions. Its main office is located in Halifax, with two district offices in Fredericton and St. John's.

==== Quebec Region ====
This region is responsible solely for the province of Quebec. Its main office is in Montreal, with one district office in Quebec City.

==== Ottawa and Toronto Regions ====
These two regions are responsible for operations in Ontario (except for NW Ontario). There are four district offices located in Niagara Falls, Windsor, downtown Toronto and at Toronto Pearson International Airport.

==== Prairie Region ====
Geographically, this represents the largest of the six regions and encompasses the area of Ontario north and west of Thunder Bay, Manitoba, Saskatchewan, Alberta and the three northern territories of Yukon, Northwest Territories and Nunavut. The regional office is located in Edmonton with three district offices located in Winnipeg, Regina and Calgary.

==== British Columbia ====
This region is responsible for the province of British Columbia. Its main office is located in downtown Burnaby with a district office at the Vancouver International Airport.

=== Executive structure ===
CSIS is functionally divided into three Deputy Directorates and five Assistant Directorates:

- Deputy Director Operations
  - Assistant Director Collection
  - Assistant Director Requirements
- Deputy Director Administration and Chief Financial Officer
- Deputy Director Policy and Strategic Partnerships
- Assistant Director Legal Services
- Assistant Director Technology
- Assistant Director Human Resources

CSIS also houses a Chief Audit and Evaluation Executive and a Senior Officer for Disclosure of Wrongdoing.

== Weapons ==
CSIS officers stationed in foreign flashpoints, such as Afghanistan, carry unspecified guns, however they are not authorized to bear arms inside Canada.

== Training ==
CSIS Intelligence Officers (IOs) are required to complete the Intelligence Officer Entry Training (IOET) program at CSIS HQ in Ottawa, Ontario, followed by a three-year professional development program with a mandatory posting in Ottawa. Upon completion of the program, IOs may progress to the investigator role and may be relocated to other offices. Intelligence Officers are put on probation for at least a year upon completion of the IOET. Foreign language training is also available for Intelligence Officers.

== Research, analysis and production ==
The RAP was reorganized in 1996–1997 in order to better coordinate with the Intelligence Assessment Secretariat of the Privy Council Office. It has four sub-divisions: Counter Intelligence, Foreign Intelligence, Counter-terrorism and Distribution.

== Oversight ==
As part of an omnibus national security bill passed by the Parliament in 2019, the oversight and reporting regime for CSIS was overhauled. The previous agency that handled all oversight of CSIS, the Security Intelligence Review Committee (SIRC) was replaced by a new agency, the National Security and Intelligence Review Agency (NSIRA), which now includes oversight of all national security and intelligence activities undertaken by any agency of the Government of Canada.

The reforms also included the creation of a new Intelligence Commissioner who reports to Parliament and has quasi-judicial oversight of all national security matters.

National Security and Intelligence Committee of Parliamentarians (NSICOP) is the primary oversight committee in regards to Canadian Intelligence. The committee performs strategic and systematic reviews of the legislative, regulatory, policy, expenditure and administrative frameworks under which national security activities are conducted. The committee is composed of members from the House of Commons and Senate. While members are made up of Members of Parliament, the committee is not a standing committee nor a special committee of Parliament. Rather, it is an agency of the executive branch, itself overseen by the Prime Minister's Office.

According to L'Hebdo Journal, it is reported that some senior officials of the service used a bunker in Ottawa to file and discuss warrant applications with judges of the Federal Court.

== Controversies ==
In the first year after its creation, CSIS was embroiled in the Air India bombing incident. There is evidence that CSIS knew of the plot three weeks before it happened, had multiple informants under surveillance, and that one of the suspects in the bombing, Surjan Singh Gill, was a CSIS informant. It was also revealed that of the 210 wiretaps recorded before and after the bombing, 156 were erased by CSIS. The scandal contributed to the resignation of CSIS' first director, Ted Finn.

Crown prosecutor James Jardine expressed frustration with CSIS to the Commission of Inquiry into the Investigation of the Bombing of Air India Flight 182, headed by Justice John C. Major. Two Canadian courts have publicly criticized CSIS for destroying wiretap evidence. One court commented on the importance of wiretap evidence from CSIS in establishing guilt. The second focused on its exculpatory value.

From 1988 to 1994, CSIS contracted a private investigator to act as an undercover agent. The agent, Grant Bristow, built relationships with far-right activists and white supremacists involved in the Nationalist Party of Canada, before breaking off with them to form the Heritage Front. Bristow would act as one of the Front's leading organizers, including helping to organize actions, recruit members, bring speakers to Canada (such as Tom Metzger), and offer training to Front activists. When the story became public knowledge, the press aired concerns that he had not only been one of the founders of the Heritage Front group, but that he had also channelled CSIS funding to the group.

In 1997, the Royal Canadian Mounted Police collaborated with CSIS on Project Sidewinder, a study alleging China had set up a foreign influence network in Canada. The RCMP accused CSIS of "watering down" the report.

In several instances, CSIS has been accused of misrepresenting facts to the courts. In 2013, CSIS was censured by Federal Court Judge Richard Mosley for deliberately misleading the Federal Court to make it possible for them to allow other agencies to spy on Canadians abroad, which is not allowed by Canadian law. Mosley found that "CSIS breached its duty of candour to the Court by not disclosing information that was relevant," according to a statement by the Federal Court.

CSIS has also been involved in cases where evidence has been mishandled or omitted from the Courts. In 2009, it was alleged that the service did not disclose information that their confidential informants, which CSIS had been relying on to gather information about their targets, were either deceptive, or failed lie-detector tests. This was not an isolated case, and in several other instances, the agency mishandling of evidence has also called for investigation.

On September 18, 2006, the Arar Commission absolved CSIS of any involvement in the extraordinary rendition by the United States of a Canadian citizen, Maher Arar. The commission found that US authorities sent Arar to Jordan and then Syria (his country of birth) based on incorrect information which had been provided by the RCMP to the US government. Arar was held by the Syrians for one year and was tortured. The sole criticism of CSIS leveled by the commission was that the agency should do more to critically examine information provided by regimes which practice torture.

On March 31, 2009, CSIS lawyer and advisor Geoffrey O'Brian told the Committee on Public Safety and National Security that CSIS would use information obtained by torture if it could prevent another attack such as 9/11 or the Air India bombing. Testifying before the same committee two days later, the director of CSIS, Jim Judd said that O'Brian "may have been confused" and "venturing into a hypothetical", and would send the committee a clarifying letter. Two weeks later CSIS announced that Judd would be retiring in June, five months before the end of his five-year term.

Prominent Canadian national security lawyer Barbara Jackman has also been critical, categorizing the research by CSIS as "sloppy" and that its officers are "susceptible to tunnel vision".

In 2017, several CSIS members including Huda Mukbil accused the organization of having a racist and homophobic workplace culture.

In 2018, CSIS was accused by Canadian lawmakers of purposely giving money to former terrorists-turned-informants for more information, CSIS repeatedly denied this. However several weeks later Director David Vigneault would appear in front of Canada's Parliament to testify regarding the act.

In June 2023, a prominent Sikh leader, Hardeep Singh Nijjar, was murdered outside a temple in British Columbia, Canada by unidentified gunmen. Notably in September, Canadian Prime Minister Justin Trudeau accused India of being behind Nijjar's death, saying that Canadian intelligence had identified "credible allegations" of a link between his death and agents of the Indian state.

In December 2023, CSIS launched a workplace assessment on CSIS' BC office due to serious allegations of rape by anonymous female CSIS officers and concerns of a toxic environment. At the same time, an ombudsman position would be created to look into workplace issues for employees to submit reports anonymously without any fear of reprisals while reports on harassment and wrongdoing by CSIS would be released annually.
