= Fred Doucet =

Canadian lobbyist, educator, university administrator and political aide

- Born: Jean Alfred Doucet; January 30, 1939 (age 86); Grand Étang, Nova Scotia
- Known for: Chief of Staff and Adviser to Brian Mulroney

Jean Alfred "Fred" Doucet (born January 30, 1939) is a Canadian lobbyist, educator, university administrator, and political aide. He was chief of staff to Brian Mulroney, from 1983 to 1984, when he was Leader of the Opposition and was a senior adviser, from 1984 to 1987, after Mulroney was elected Prime Minister of Canada. He was involved in the Airbus affair.

== Early life and education ==
Born in Grand Étang, Nova Scotia, Doucet received a Bachelor of Science degree from St. Francis Xavier University in 1960, a Bachelor of Education degree in 1964 from Mount Allison University, and a Master of Education degree in 1966 from Mount Allison University. In 1976, he received a doctorate in educational administration from the University of Ottawa. It was while Doucet was at St. Francis Xavier University he met Brian Mulroney. Fred Doucet is the younger brother of Gerald Doucet, a Canadian Progressive Conservative politician and lobbyist.

== Academic career ==
From 1960 to 1962, Doucet was a high school teacher in Manitoba. From 1962 to 1965, he was a high school principal in Quebec. In 1965, he was appointed dean of studies at St. Lawrence College, Université Laval. In 1968, he was appointed administrative assistant to the president of St. Francis Xavier University. After a doctoral study leave from 1974 to 1976, he was appointed a director of student services and a professor of organizational behavior & administration theory at St. Francis Xavier University. From 1979 to 1982, he was a director of development. Doucet enlisted Mulroney to spearhead a fundraising drive for the school; Mulroney's leadership helped bring in $11 million, $4 million over the original goal (The Politics of Ambition, by John Sawatsky, 1991, p. 498).

== Business career ==
In 1982, he was appointed CEO of East Coast Energy Limited. This company, which aimed to develop offshore oil and gas resources in Atlantic Canada, was highly speculative, and wound up being significantly undercapitalized. Offshore petroleum development is much more expensive than land-based petroleum development, with exploration, well-drilling, and extraction costs being in the hundreds of millions of dollars, restricting entry to the major industry players. East Coast Energy, a new company with little specialized expertise, foundered in 1983 (On The Take: Crime, Corruption, and Greed in the Mulroney Years, by Stevie Cameron, 1994), and most of its investors, including Walter Wolf, Brian Mulroney, and others, lost everything, as no petroleum was ever produced by the company.

== Political career ==
Doucet became a backroom Tory in his university years. He assisted Mulroney with his 1983 local campaign in the Central Nova riding (The Politics of Ambition, by John Sawatsky, 1991, p. 501). In 1983, he was appointed chief of staff to Brian Mulroney after he became Leader of the Opposition (The Politics of Ambition, by John Sawatsky, 1991, p. 502). Doucet played a significant role in the 1984 national election campaign (The Politics of Ambition, by John Sawatsky, 1991). After Mulroney was elected prime minister, Doucet was his senior adviser from 1984 to 1987. From 1987 to 1989, he was an organizer for the economic summit in the Department of External Affairs.

== Lobbyist ==
In 1988, he founded his own lobbying firm Fred Doucet Consulting International (FDCI) in association with his brother Gerald Doucet. In 1990, he was appointed CEO of Government Business Consulting Group Inc., which he founded with Jean-Jacques Blais, John Manion, Lincoln Alexander, and Judd Buchanan.

German-Canadian lobbyist and dealmaker Karlheinz Schreiber filed an affidavit in Ontario Superior Court in early November 2007, which claimed that Fred Doucet had requested cash transfers on behalf of Mulroney for the Airbus affair deal. Doucet denied this. A public inquiry was called by Canadian Prime Minister Stephen Harper, and Schreiber appeared before the House of Commons of Canada's Ethics Committee, under its study of the Mulroney Airbus Settlement, where he repeated the statement. Both Mulroney and Doucet are on the list of witnesses which the Ethics Committee intends to call in the future. Doucet had also testified in the libel suit brought by Mulroney against the Government of Canada, over allegations that Mulroney had received cash from Schreiber; Mulroney claimed to have done no business with Schreiber after he stepped down as prime minister. Mulroney received a $2.1 million settlement and an apology in 1997. It was later revealed that Mulroney had in fact accepted $300,000 in three cash installments from Schreiber, facts which were not disclosed until much later. Schreiber stated that Fred Doucet had set up the three meetings where Schreiber paid Mulroney in 1993 and 1994 (the first meeting occurred while Mulroney was still a member of Parliament), and was present at the final meeting where cash changed hands (The Globe and Mail, November 9, 2007, p. A1; and December 7, 2007, p. A1).
