= Gerald Doucet =

Canadian politician

The Honourable Gerald J. Doucet ECNS QC
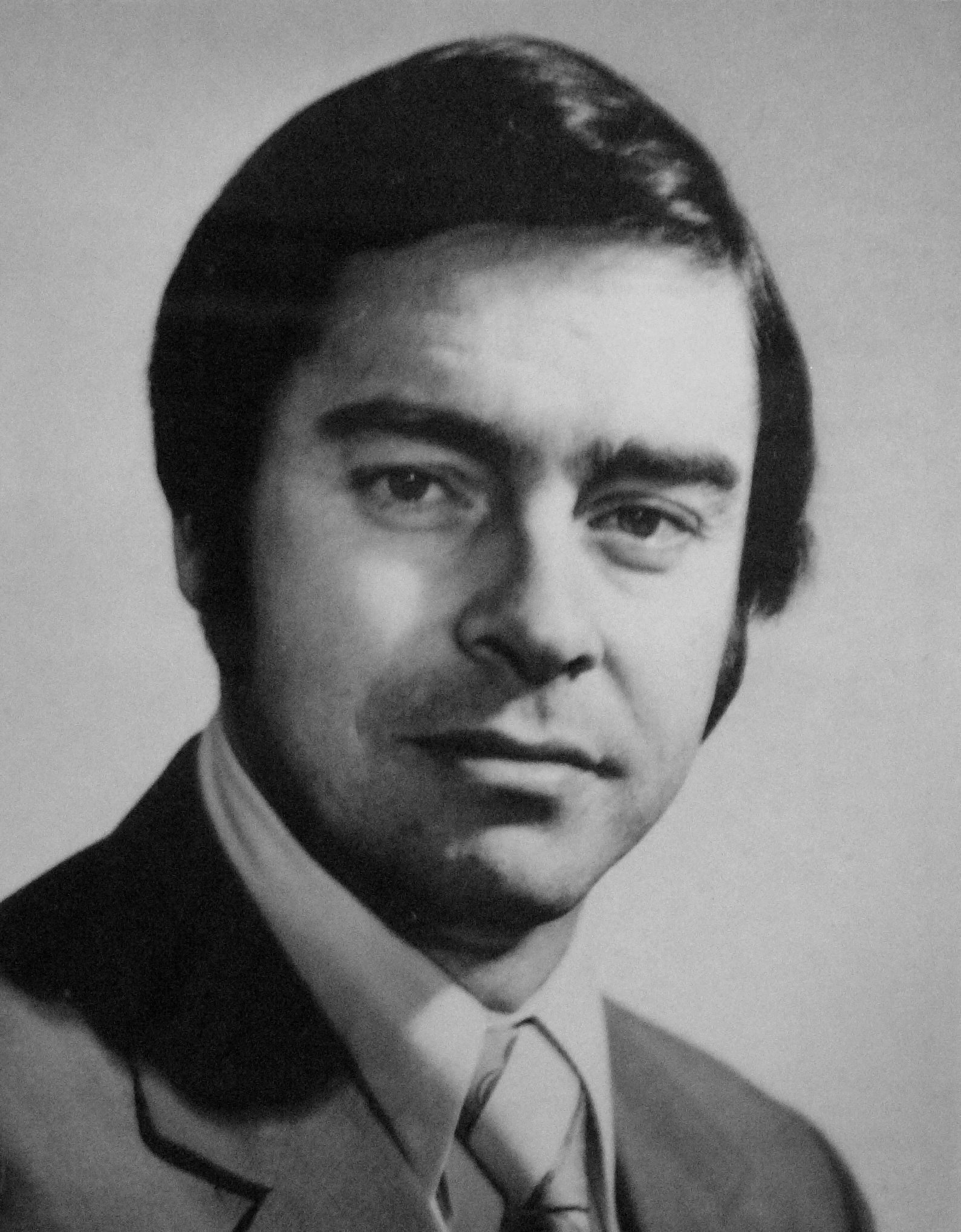
- Doucet, c. 1973

MLA for Richmond
- In office 1963–1974
- Preceded by: Earl Urquhart
- Succeeded by: Gaston LeBlanc

Personal details
- Born: May 4, 1937 Grand Étang, Nova Scotia
- Died: November 23, 2017 (aged 80) Halifax, Nova Scotia
- Party: Progressive Conservative
- Occupation: Lawyer

Gerald Joseph Doucet, QC (May 4, 1937 – November 23, 2017) was a Canadian politician and lobbyist. He represented the electoral district of Richmond in the Nova Scotia House of Assembly from 1963 to 1974, as a Progressive Conservative.

== Early life and education ==
Born in Grand Étang, Nova Scotia in 1937, Doucet graduated from St. Francis Xavier University in 1958, and went on to earn a law degree from Dalhousie University in 1961.

== Political career ==
Doucet was first elected to the Nova Scotia House of Assembly in the 1963 general election, defeating Liberal leader Earl Urquhart by 83 votes in the Richmond riding. He was re-elected in 1967 and 1970. He served in the Executive Council of Nova Scotia as Provincial Secretary, and Minister of Education. When appointed in 1964, Doucet was the first Acadian cabinet minister in the province's history.

Doucet ran for leader of the Progressive Conservative Party of Nova Scotia at the party's 1971 leadership convention, finishing second to John Buchanan.

== After politics ==
Starting in 1984, the year he wrote Canada-Nova Scotia Offshore Agreement: One Year Later, Doucet was a member of the successful but sometimes controversial Ottawa consulting firm Government Consultants International (GCI), along with Frank Moores, Francis Fox, and Gary Ouellet (The Insiders, by John Sawatsky, 1987; On The Take, by Stevie Cameron, 1994).

In 2004 Doucet published his biography, Acadian Footprints.

== Personal life and death ==
Doucet was the brother of Fred Doucet, who served as Brian Mulroney's first Chief of Staff when he became leader of the federal Progressive Conservative Party in 1983, and served on his staff in the Prime Minister's Office while Mulroney was Prime Minister from 1984 to 1993. His daughter Michelle Doucet is Assistant Superintendent, Corporate Services sector, at the Office of the Superintendent of Financial Institutions (OSFI).

Doucet died in Halifax, Nova Scotia on November 23, 2017.
