= Karlheinz Schreiber =

German-Canadian businessman and criminal (born 1934)

- Born: 25 March 1934 (age 92); Petersdorf, Thuringia
- Occupations: Industrialist, lobbyist, fundraiser, arms dealer and businessman
- Known for: Alleged role in the 1999 CDU contributions scandal in Germany, Airbus affair in Canada

Karlheinz Schreiber (born 25 March 1934) is a German and Canadian citizen, an industrialist, lobbyist, fundraiser, arms dealer, businessman, and convicted criminal. He has been in the news regarding his alleged role in the 1999 CDU contributions scandal in Germany, which damaged the political legacy of former Chancellor of Germany Helmut Kohl and involves the former Federal Minister of Finance of Germany Wolfgang Schäuble as well as the Airbus affair in Canada, which was linked through allegation to former prime minister of Canada Brian Mulroney. He was extradited to Germany on 2 August 2009, and convicted of tax evasion.

== Early life and career ==
Schreiber was born in Petersdorf, Thuringia. His family was working class and belonged to an evangelical Lutheran community. His mother was a cook and his father worked in upholstery.

Schreiber became a lobbyist and deal maker. He was a fund raiser for the Christian Democratic Union (CDU) and Christian Social Union (CSU) in West Germany before and during Helmut Kohl's chancellorship. Schreiber stated in his House of Commons of Canada testimony on 29 November 2007 that he had been a lay judge, for nine years in Germany.

In 1991, Schreiber donated DM 1 million to the CDU, the party of the then Chancellor of Germany Helmut Kohl. These donations were crucial in the party financing scandal that erupted in 1999 that damaged Kohl's political legacy.

== Role in Canada ==
Schreiber set up trust accounts in Alberta for wealthy Germans in the early 1980s; among the people he served was Franz Josef Strauss, who had been premier of Bavaria. Strauss became chairman of Airbus Industries in the 1980s, and saw Air Canada award a large contract of C$1.8 billion for new planes to Airbus, winning over the bid from Boeing (theretofore the supplier for Air Canada), shortly before his death in 1988.

The National Post reported on 11 December 2007, that in 1979 Alberta premier Peter Lougheed had rejected any business contact with Schreiber, according to Lee Richardson, who was then an aide to Lougheed and later a federal Member of Parliament from 2004 until 2012.

Schreiber obtained his Canadian citizenship in 1982 while retaining his (West) German citizenship. He was based in Calgary during his early years in Canada, but moved his main liaison activities to Montreal in the early 1980s.

Schreiber was a key figure in Canada's Airbus affair, in which he allegedly arranged secret commissions to be paid to Brian Mulroney and lobbyist Frank Moores in exchange for then Crown corporation Air Canada's purchase of Airbus jets. There has never been any evidence produced to substantiate this allegation, and both Schreiber and Mulroney deny it.

Mulroney sued the government of Canada for libel, and in early 1997 received a $2.1 million (CDN) settlement and an apology. During an examination under oath, Mulroney claimed that he hardly knew Schreiber, and had had no business dealings with him.

Schreiber allegedly made payments of $300,000 in cash, in three instalments, to Brian Mulroney beginning one month after Mulroney had stepped down as Prime Minister but while Mulroney was still a sitting member of Parliament. Schreiber had previously been a fundraiser in Mulroney's successful campaign to win the 1983 Progressive Conservative leadership convention. Mulroney has since admitted to receiving $225,000 from Schreiber, in cash, and not reporting this in his income tax returns until eight years later, subsequent to Schreiber's indictment in Germany for bribery, tax evasion and fraud and extradition order from Canada.

In October 2004, then Canadian Justice Minister Irwin Cotler ordered Schreiber to surrender himself to German authorities. Schreiber, however, remained in Canada exhausting his appeals, until he was finally extradited to Germany on 2 August 2009.

=== Supreme Court orders extradition ===
On 1 February 2007, the Supreme Court of Canada accepted the extradition to his native Germany. On 10 May 2007, the Ontario Court of Appeal ruled that extradition was appropriate as it is "for the German courts to deal with the applicant's apprehension of prejudgement and to fashion the appropriate remedy, if one is warranted."

On 24 March 2007, he filed suit in the Ontario Superior Court against Brian Mulroney for services not rendered. He alleged that he had made payments to Mulroney in 1993 and 1994 totalling $300,000 in cash in equal instalments of $100,000; that Mulroney had agreed to aid in the building of a factory to make light armoured vehicles in Quebec; and that Mulroney never held up his end of the bargain.

In October 2007, Schreiber had apparently exhausted all avenues of legal appeal regarding his extradition to Germany and was set to be extradited to face charges. However, his lawyers, Edward Greenspan and Gary Botting, made a last-ditch motion using a rarely used provision, which granted him another delay.

=== Public inquiry ===
On 31 October 2007, the CBC Television show The Fifth Estate broadcast a one-hour program on the Schreiber – Mulroney situation. The program was titled Brian Mulroney: The Unauthorized Chapter. The same day the Globe and Mail published a feature article on the relationship between Karlheinz Schreiber and Brian Mulroney; the stories revealed, for the first time, that Brian Mulroney had made a voluntary disclosure to Revenue Canada years after he had received envelopes of cash from Karlheinz Schreiber. The Globe and Mail and CBC reporters, Greg McArthur and Harvey Cashore, had teamed up to conduct research together, each organization maintaining editorial control over their own stories.

Then, in the week of 5 November 2007, Schreiber, assisted by his lawyer Richard Anka, filed an affidavit in Ontario Superior Court, related to his suit against Brian Mulroney filed in March; it contained several explosive allegations against Mulroney. Among Schreiber's claims was that he had met with Mulroney to discuss business a few days before the then-prime minister stepped down in June 1993, contradicting Mulroney's claim made during his libel suit. Schreiber also claimed that he had written a letter to current Prime Minister Stephen Harper on his extradition situation, and that he had asked Mulroney to intercede with Harper on this matter when Mulroney met with Harper in 2006.

Coverage by The Globe and Mail newspaper on 9 November led Prime Minister Stephen Harper to announce later that day that he would name a special independent adviser in the days ahead, to investigate Schreiber's statements; Mulroney promised his full cooperation. Harper also announced that federal Conservative caucus members were to have nothing to do with Mulroney while the investigative process unfolded, and denied any personal dealings with Schreiber. The Globe and Mail, which had published a large front-page picture on 9 November 2007 showing Mulroney meeting with Schreiber in the prime minister's office (accompanied by two of Mulroney's senior staff members), continued its extensive coverage on 10 November, and other Canadian media outlets also took up the story.

On 13 November 2007, after Mulroney requested a public inquiry, Prime Minister Harper announced that a full public inquiry would take place.

The day after, on 14 November 2007, a report on CBC.ca quoted expert opinion saying that Schreiber's potential extradition to Germany could be delayed further by the timing of the public inquiry. On the same day, Prime Minister Harper announced that David Lloyd Johnston, president of the University of Waterloo, would set the terms of the public inquiry, and would report to the Prime Minister by 11 January 2008. Also on 14 November, the Royal Canadian Mounted Police announced that they would begin a review of these matters; the RCMP had originally investigated the situation starting in the late 1980s.

On 15 November 2007, Schreiber lost his extradition appeal. Crown lawyers said that Justice Minister Rob Nicholson would wait at least 15 days before extraditing Schreiber to Germany. However, Schreiber has vowed that he would not cooperate with the public inquiry if he was extradited. Minister of Public Safety Stockwell Day stated on 16 November that Schreiber would have to cooperate with the inquiry, regardless of circumstances, and Bavarian prosecutors stated they would abide by the Canadian government's decisions on Schreiber's extradition.

On 21 November 2007, The Globe and Mail reported that Mulroney spokesman Luc Lavoie stated Mulroney was broke in late August 1993, when he accepted the first $100,000 cash payment from Schreiber, while still a member of the House of Commons of Canada.

On 21 November 2007, legal pundits interviewed on various Canadian network television news channels speculated that Schreiber would most likely be extradited during a clandestine "middle-of-the-night" series of flights from Toronto Island Airport, through the United States, and on to Germany, and that it would most likely happen within hours of a Supreme Court of Canada announcement that it will not hear Schreiber's final appeal.

=== Commons Ethics Committee summons Schreiber ===
On 21 November 2007, the website ctv.ca reported that the House of Commons of Canada Standing Committee on Access to Information, Privacy and Ethics had struck a deal to hear testimony from Schreiber as soon as possible, possibly in advance of any possible extradition. As would be the case on any Parliamentary Committee when a minority government is in power, Opposition party members outnumbered the governing party members on this committee; perhaps more important, this committee had elected an opposition member, Paul Szabo, as its chairperson.

On 23 November 2007, The Globe and Mail reported that the Commons Ethics Committee wanted to summon Schreiber to testify before it on 27 and 29 November. For this to occur, Schreiber would have to be released from jail in Toronto and travel to Ottawa, Ontario, Canada's capital. The government refused to permit the release. Schreiber stated that if he testified, he wanted bail, to wear a business suit and not his prison jumpsuit, and would like time to study his files which were stored at his house in Ottawa. Schreiber had also stated that the German government may have obtained information from his Swiss bank accounts through Swiss authorities, without following proper procedures, and planned to use this as grounds for appealing his extradition. The plan was that Brian Mulroney would then appear before the Ethics Committee in the week following Schreiber's testimony.

On 26 November 2007, Canadian Press reported that Democracy Watch head Duff Conacher claimed that Prime Minister Stephen Harper and Justice Minister Rob Nicholson are in a conflict of interest position with respect to the Mulroney-Schreiber matters, and had asked the Federal Ethics Commissioner Mary Dawson to investigate. That day, 26 November, Schreiber received a hand-delivered summons from the chair of the Ethics Committee, Paul Szabo, a Liberal, to appear before the Commons Ethics Committee. The problem was that Schreiber was being held in a provincial jail in Toronto awaiting extradition which could take place as soon as 1 December. That he had a summons to appear in Ottawa was not going to be sufficient to get him released from the jail. In the House of Commons, Szabo reminded Minister of Justice Rob Nicholson that although Schreiber was in a provincial jail, he was held there under a federal warrant. Szabo demanded that Minister Nicholson bring him before the Committee in the Commons. Nicholson claimed that he had no jurisdiction in the matter. Later, on 28 November, House of Commons legal counsel Rob Walsh expressed his disagreement with Nicholson's opinion, stating "the Minister could facilitate this process in my view." (The National Post, 28 November 2007).

This situation caused New Democratic Party MP Pat Martin, a member of the Commons Ethics Committee, to move later that afternoon that the Committee ask the Speaker of the House of Commons to issue a "Speaker's Warrant", an instrument which had not been used in Canada since 1913, so that Schreiber could be released from the Toronto jail where he was being held. The Committee passed Martin's motion, voting strictly along party lines, with the Conservatives opposed and the other parties in favour.

The next day, 27 November, Commons Speaker Peter Milliken stated that he would immediately issue a Speaker's Warrant to have Schreiber brought to Ottawa so he could testify before the Commons Ethics Committee as soon as possible. Later that day, the Commons voice-voted unanimously to approve the Speaker's Warrant, thus permitting Schreiber to appear before the Commons Ethics Committee on 29 November.

On 27 November, CBC Television broadcast a 1991 picture of Schreiber and his wife together with Mulroney and his wife, at an event in Germany; this was during Mulroney's second term as Canadian prime minister. In an interview with CBC, Schreiber, who has not been charged with or convicted of any crime in Canada, said that the matter is "the biggest political justice scandal in Canadian history." On 30 November, Ontario Superior Court was set to hear an appeal from Schreiber on further delaying his extradition to Germany, which could have taken place as soon as the following day, 1 December.

=== Appears before Ethics Committee, extradition delayed ===
On 28 November 2007, Schreiber was transported from Toronto to Ottawa, where he spent the night in the Ottawa-Carleton Detention Centre. The next morning, 29 November, he arrived at the House of Commons, where he was given a room for personal use, and to review his documents (which he was able to retrieve from his Ottawa home), prior to his testimony before the Ethics Committee. Schreiber was then scheduled to testify on 29 November 4 December, and 6 December; his extradition to Germany has been postponed. Brian Mulroney will testify later before the Committee.

The formal title for the Ethics Committee's proceedings was: "Study of the Mulroney Airbus Settlement".

In his first-day testimony before the Ethics Committee on 29 November, Schreiber, placed under oath, answered a few questions from MPs, but deferred the answers to most others, replying that he needed more time to study his files.

On 29 November, The Globe and Mail published the text of the 2006 Schreiber letter to Mulroney requesting help with Schreiber's extradition problems; Schreiber claimed that he had been assisted in the composition of this letter by Elmer MacKay, a former Cabinet minister in the Mulroney government. Elmer MacKay had stepped down from his Nova Scotia Commons seat in Central Nova in 1983, so that Mulroney, who had just become Progressive Conservative leader without being a member of the House of Commons, would have a riding to run in, to gain formal admission to Parliament. Mulroney did win the by-election in August 1983. Elmer MacKay was then re-elected to Parliament in the 1984 Mulroney majority victory, and served in Cabinet as Solicitor General, Minister of National Revenue, and Minister of Public Works, as well as heading the Atlantic Canada Opportunity Agency. Elmer MacKay had also later worked for Schreiber's companies, after leaving Parliament in 1993. Schreiber had hired Elmer MacKay's son Peter MacKay to work for him at Thyssen AG in Germany in 1992; the plan was to train Peter MacKay as the head of the prospective Thyssen plant to manufacture light armoured vehicles, which had gained initial government approval, but was never built. Peter MacKay served as the Canadian Minister of Defence in the years 2007–2013. In his testimony before the Commons Ethics Committee on 29 November, Schreiber further elaborated on this situation.

On 30 November, Schreiber's lawyer Edward Greenspan was successful in an appeal to the Ontario Superior Court for a stay in Schreiber's extradition to Germany; this was then delayed indefinitely, to allow Schreiber to appear before the Commons Ethics Committee. Greenspan planned a further appeal to the Supreme Court of Canada.

Schreiber remained under confinement at the Ottawa Detention Centre, with limited access to his files stored in his Ottawa home; his lawyer Edward Greenspan claimed this situation made it difficult for Schreiber to prepare properly for his appearances before the Ethics Committee, explaining his partial answers to questions from MPs. Greenspan stated he aimed to achieve bail for Schreiber as soon as possible.

On 4 December 2007, represented by lawyer Richard Auger, Schreiber was granted bail when he posted $1.3 million. He was allowed to live in his Ottawa home while testifying before the Commons Ethics Committee. In his second day of testimony before the Ethics Committee, on 4 December, Schreiber stated that the $300,000 which he paid Mulroney from 1993 to 1994 did not involve Airbus, nor did it involve any business which may have occurred between the two men while Mulroney was prime minister. Schreiber provided several files of his correspondence with Mulroney and Harper, for the Committee members to study, so that they could better prepare future questions. Schreiber stated that he had donated $30,000 in cash to the unsuccessful 1993 PC leadership campaign of Jean Charest through his brother Robert Charest; this was legal at that time. Charest, now the Liberal premier of the province of Quebec, stated that the amount had been $10,000; in the 1999 book The Last Amigo, by Stevie Cameron and Harvey Cashore, the donation amount quoted was $13,000. Schreiber also received an apology from the Committee for the degrading treatment he had suffered, when his pants fell down while he was being escorted from the Commons, which had been filmed and shown on television around the world (his belt had been taken from him, as standard procedure with escorted prisoners).

On 6 December, Schreiber made his third appearance before the Ethics Committee. He stated that the $300,000, paid in three cash payments to Mulroney in 1993 and 1994, came from a Swiss Bank account, where he had deposited the 'success fees' which Schreiber had earned in commissions for his work as a lobbyist, from successful contracts with Airbus, MBB, and Thyssen in the late 1980s and early 1990s. Airbus and MBB had concluded very large contracts, for airplanes and helicopters respectively, with the Canadian government while Mulroney was prime minister from 1984 to 1993, while Thyssen's project, a new factory to manufacture light armoured vehicles, the Bear Head project, received initial government approval, but was never built. Schreiber also stated that Mulroney may have also received Airbus money which Schreiber paid to the lobbying firm Government Consultants International, through GCI personnel. Three of the four GCI principal partners at that time – Frank Moores, Gary Ouellet, and Gerald Doucet — had close ties to the PC Party and to Mulroney himself. GCI went out of business in 1994, a year after Mulroney stepped down as prime minister. A former employee of the GCI firm is scheduled to testify before the Ethics Committee regarding these matters in the future. Schreiber also claimed that Fred Doucet (younger brother of Gerald Doucet), who had served as Chief of Staff while Mulroney was Opposition Leader from 1983 to 1984, and who continued to serve on Mulroney's staff in the Prime Minister's Office after that had in the early 1990s asked Schreiber to send money from the sale of Airbus planes to Mulroney's lawyer in Geneva. Fred Doucet has denied that statement. Fred Doucet, who also testified supporting Mulroney in the Mulroney libel case in the mid-1990s, is on the list of future witnesses for the Ethics Committee. Mulroney has refused to comment before his scheduled appearance before the Ethics Committee, set for 13 December 2007.

Schreiber appeared again before the inquiry with new lawyer Marc Lalonde in November 2008.

Subsequent to the Ethics Committee proceedings, a further public enquiry by the Oliphant Commission began in April 2009. The Commission's hearings phase ended in the last week of July. Schreiber's bail order included a condition that he should report to the Toronto Detention Centre within 48 hours of the Minister ordering final surrender. This would normally allow his lawyers ample time to apply to a court for a further extension. However, at 5 p.m. on the Friday before the August long weekend, the Royal Canadian Mounted Police (RCMP) served Schreiber at his Ottawa home with a summons requiring that he give himself up to Toronto Detention Centre by 5 p.m. the following Sunday. His lawyer Gary Botting, was in Ottawa with Schreiber trying to arrange for a hearing the following week in the Federal Court of Canada in Ottawa to challenge the constitutionality of the Canada-Germany Extradition Treaty, which has never been ratified by Parliament. Botting immediately flew from Ottawa to Toronto and with Greenspan was able to arrange an emergency hearing before an Ontario Superior Court judge in Toronto, to pursue yet another legal loophole: Schreiber was required to report to the Toronto Detention Centre within 48 hours, and as long as he did so, the RCMP did not have a court order to take Schreiber anywhere else. In those circumstances, the prison warden had the final say over whether Schreiber should be released to the custody of the RCMP. Meanwhile, the judge refused a request for an adjournment until after the long weekend. In light of her ruling, the acting warden of Toronto Detention Centre declined to exercise his prerogative to detain Schreiber in custody until after the civic holiday, and on the doorstep of the jail handed custody directly over to the RCMP as soon as Schreiber gave himself up just before the 5 p.m. deadline. The RCMP in turn escorted Schreiber to Toronto's Pearson International Airport, and thence to Germany via Lufthansa. Less than three hours after the court denied him an adjournment so that the Court of Appeal could hear further argument, Schreiber was declared "surrendered to Germany," and the decade-long saga came to an end.

=== States that West German funds financed Clark's fall ===
Schreiber appeared for the fourth time before the Ethics Committee on 11 December. He stated that significant funds from West German sources financed the 1983 Winnipeg ouster of Joe Clark as Progressive Conservative leader; Clark had called for a leadership convention, which led five months later to Brian Mulroney winning. Schreiber said he contributed $25,000 himself, and that the late Franz Josef Strauss, Airbus chairman and former Bavarian premier, added a similar amount. Schreiber also raised the possibility that Strauss's political party, the Christian Social Union, may have also given substantial funds. It was already known from 1983 that Walter Wolf, the Austrian-Canadian businessman and entrepreneur, had by his own admission also contributed $25,000 for this project. Mulroney had quickly distanced himself from Wolf following that admission. The money was used to transport and house many pro-Mulroney delegates, who voted against Clark, narrowly denying him sufficient support to continue as leader, despite a large lead over the governing Liberals, led by Pierre Trudeau, in the polls.

A series of successful burglaries in Montreal in 1984, which targeted files on financial contributions to the Mulroney camp, held in the homes and offices of Walter Wolf, W. David Angus, Roger Nantel, Rodrigue Pageau, and others, eliminated most if not all records of the German cash, along with material on others' contributions. Despite police investigation, none of the burglaries were ever solved.

Schreiber also stated that he transferred at least $5 million from his deals to the lobbying firm Government Consultants International, which had three senior Tories, Frank Moores, Gerald Doucet, and Gary Ouellet, as part of its management team; all three men had close ties to Mulroney. This money came from firms Airbus, MBB, and Thyssen, which Schreiber was representing for Canadian projects.

The Globe and Mail reported on 12 December that money from Strauss had also financed Moores to the tune of several hundred thousand dollars in the early 1980s, through purchase of some of his isolated rural land holdings in Newfoundland.

On 11 December, following his testimony before the Ethics Committee, Schreiber was interviewed by Peter Mansbridge, anchor of The National newscast on CBC Television. Schreiber told Mansbridge that Franz Josef Strauss had a policy of helping to elect conservative-leaning governments around the world, by financing their campaigns, and that the Canadian case was just one example. Schreiber also told Mansbridge that Mulroney knew that the $300,000 in cash that he received from Schreiber from 1993 to 1994 was coming from the Thyssen account, and that the arrangement called for Mulroney to lobby on behalf of Thyssen to develop the Bear Head project, once he stepped down from office as prime minister in June 1993. Mulroney did not tell Schreiber at that time that the Bear Head project, which had in 1988 received initial Cabinet approval from three ministers, as well as the Nova Scotia government, was cancelled in 1990. Schreiber said he had met with Mulroney and cabinet minister Elmer MacKay at the prime minister's residence, 24 Sussex Drive, in March 1993, to discuss the Bear Head project. This contradicted Mulroney's sworn statement made at his 1996 libel trial that he had had no business with Schreiber. Schreiber said that no receipt or invoice was issued at the time for the C$300,000 deal with Mulroney.

Special adviser David Lloyd Johnston delivered his report on the Mulroney – Schreiber matters to Prime Minister Harper, as scheduled on 11 January 2008. Johnston found 16 significant questions requiring further examination.

Schreiber enlisted the aid of extradition law expert Gary Botting, who was preparing to challenge the validity of the Canada-Germany bilateral extradition treaty in the Federal Court on the basis that it had never been ratified by Parliament. Schreiber's bail order stated that he must give himself up within 48 hours of receiving notice that the Minister of Justice had issued a final surrender order. The RCMP served this notice at 5 p.m. on the Friday before Labour Day, giving Schreiber no time to appeal. Botting flew to Toronto, where he and Greenspan mounted a last-ditch effort to challenge the surrender order before the Ontario Superior Court. However, the judge refused the application, and Schreiber was placed on a plane bound for Germany that afternoon.

== Tax evasion conviction in Germany ==
After Schreiber's arrival in Germany, a German court in Augsburg took control of the proceedings and announced that it would hear only charges that he evaded income tax on C$45.6-million earned from negotiating the sale of helicopters, aircraft, and armaments. In May 2010, the court found Schreiber to be guilty of tax evasion of €7.3 million, and sentenced him to eight years in prison. This decision was overthrown by a German court on 6 September 2011.

On retrial in 2013, Schreiber was sentenced to six and a half years in prison, but the sentence is being served through house arrest on health grounds.

== In books ==
Schreiber's career in Canada is detailed in the 2001 book by Stevie Cameron and Harvey Cashore, The Last Amigo: Karlheinz Schreiber and the Anatomy of a Scandal. He is prominent in Cameron's On the Take: Crime, Corruption and Greed in the Mulroney Years (1994). Schreiber's Canadian dealings are also featured in two books by William Kaplan: in 1998, Kaplan wrote Presumed Guilty: Brian Mulroney, the Airbus Affair, and the Government of Canada, and in 2004, followed up on the latest developments in A Secret Trial: Brian Mulroney, Stevie Cameron, and the Public Trust. Synopses of eleven reported judicial decisions associated with the Germany v. Schreiber extradition file between 1999 and 2009 are found in various editions of Gary Botting's text Canadian Extradition Law Practice.
