= 2002 German federal election =

- 22 September 2002

All 603 seats in the Bundestag 302 seats needed for a majority
- Registered: 61,432,868 ▲1.1%
- Turnout: 48,582,761 (79.1%) ▼3.1 pp
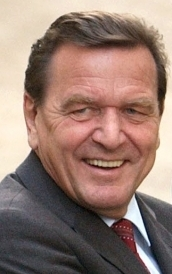

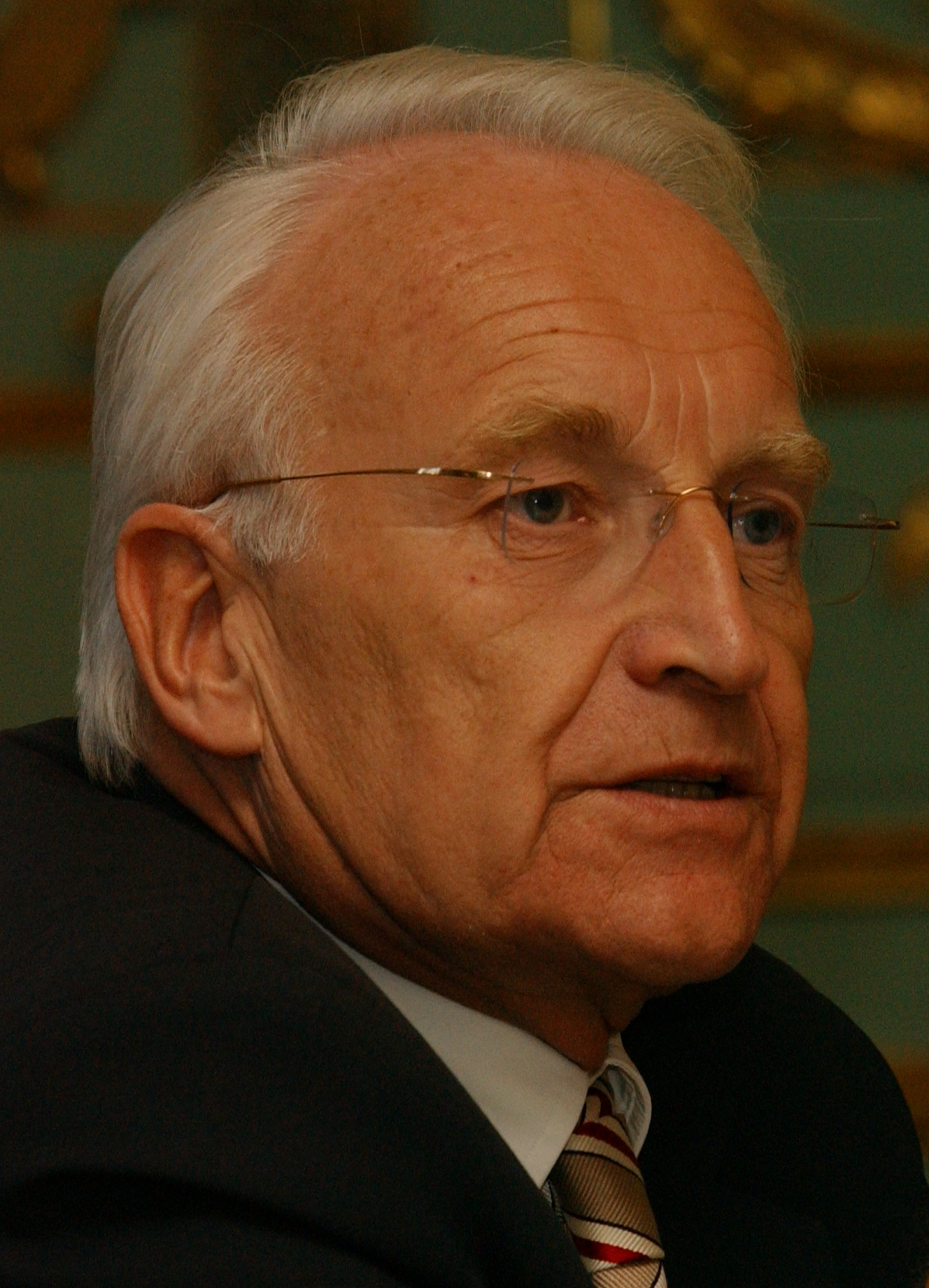

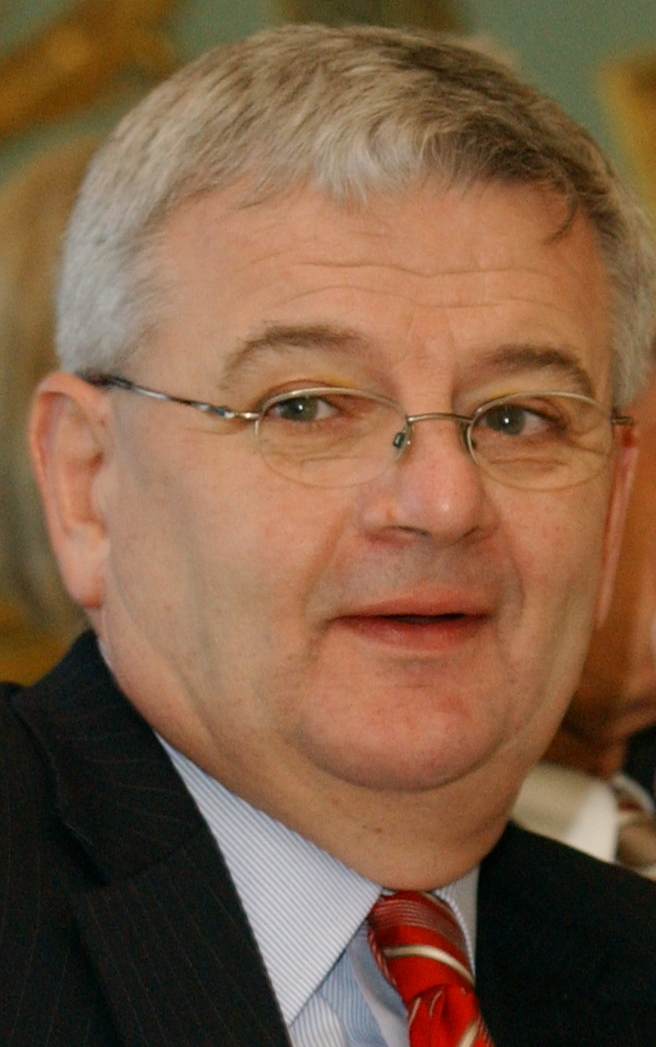

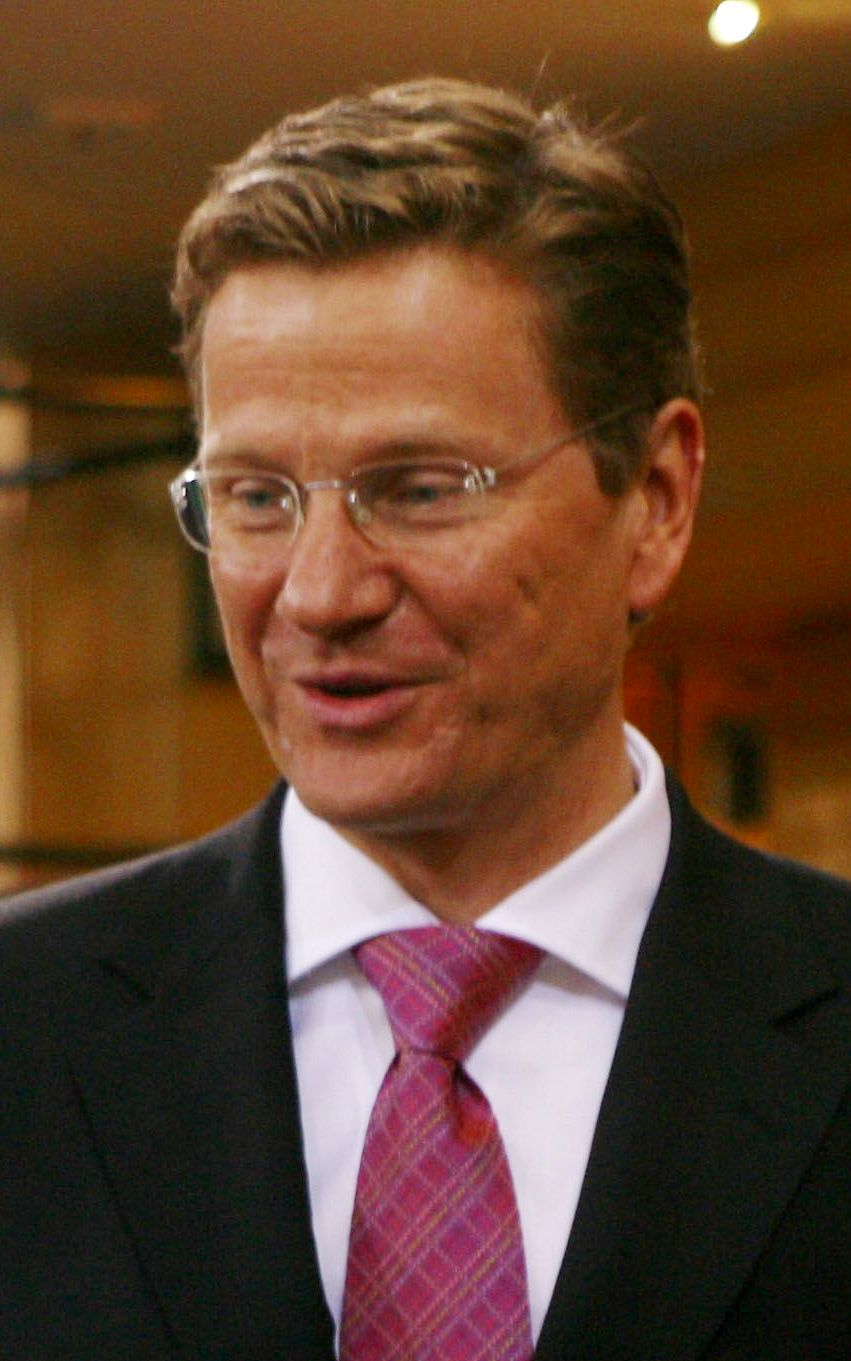

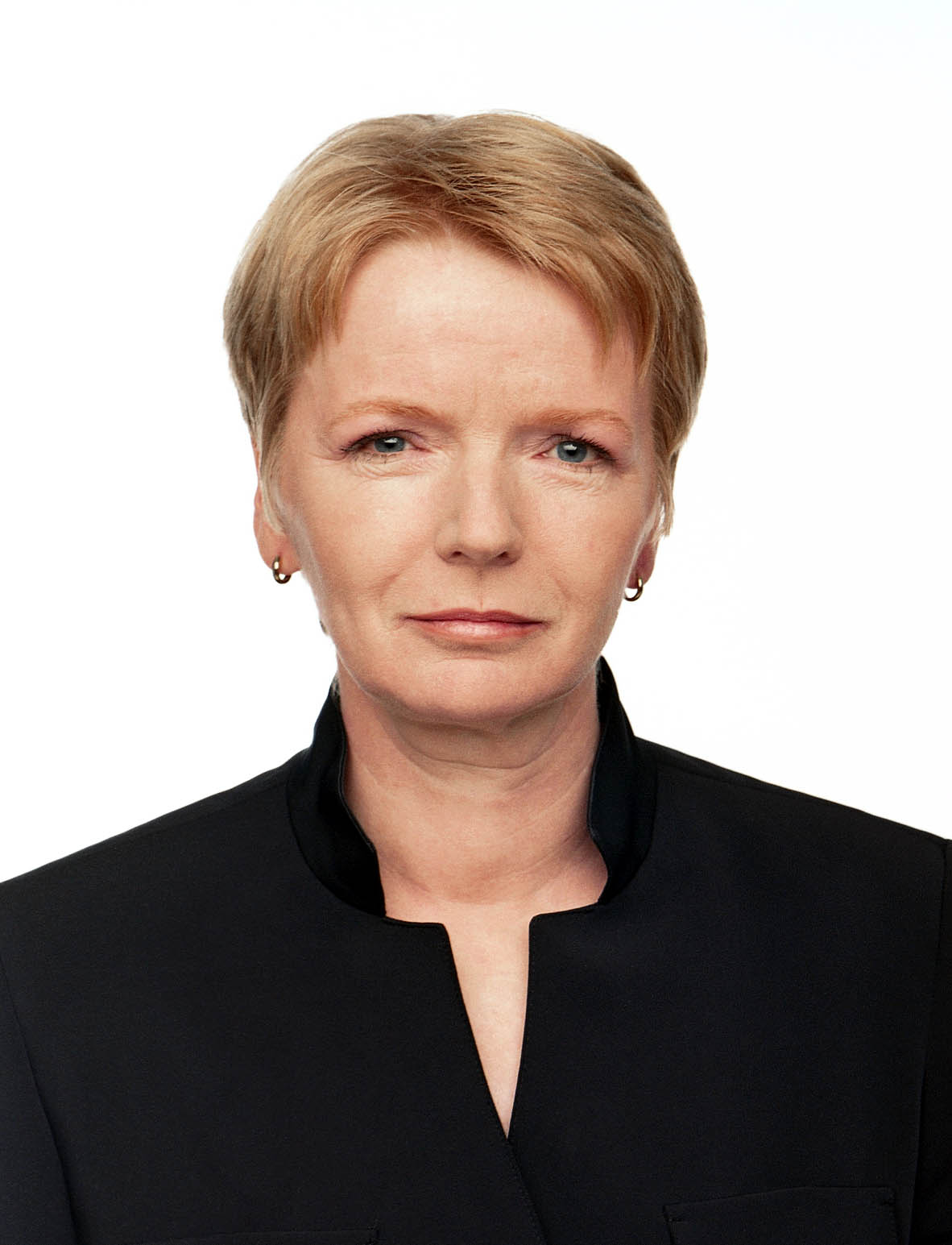
	First party	Second party	Third party
Candidate	Gerhard Schröder	Edmund Stoiber	Joschka Fischer
Party	SPD	CDU/CSU	Greens
Last election	40.9%, 298 seats	35.1%, 245 seats	6.7%, 47 seats
Seats won	251	248	55
Seat change	▼47	▲3	▲8
Popular vote	18,488,668	18,482,641	4,110,355
Percentage	38.5%	38.5%	8.6%
Swing	▼2.4 pp	▲3.4 pp	▲1.9 pp
	Fourth party	Fifth party
Candidate	Guido Westerwelle	Gabi Zimmer (Note: Zimmer was federal chairwoman of the PDS. She was one of four lead candidates appointed by the party congress. The others were Roland Claus, Dietmar Bartsch, and Petra Pau.)
Party	FDP	PDS
Last election	6.2%, 43 seats	5.1%, 36 seats
Seats won	47	2
Seat change	▲4	▼34
Popular vote	3,538,815	1,916,702
Percentage	7.4%	4.0%
Swing	▲1.2 pp	▼1.1 pp
- Results of the election. The main map shows constituency winners, and results for the proportional list seats are shown in the bottom left.
Government before election
First Schröder cabinet
SPD–Green
Government after election
Second Schröder cabinet
SPD–Greens

A federal election was held in Germany on 22 September 2002 to elect the members of the 15th Bundestag. Incumbent Chancellor Gerhard Schröder's centre-left "red-green" governing coalition retained a narrow majority, and the Social Democratic Party (SPD) retained their status as the largest party in the Bundestag by three seats.

== Issues and campaign ==
Several issues dominated the campaign, with the opposition CDU/CSU attacking the government's performance on the economy which fell back into recession due to the Telecoms crash and the introduction of the euro, as well as campaigning on family values and against taxes (particularly on fuel).

In the run up to the election, the CSU/CDU held a huge lead in the opinion polls and Christian Social Union (CSU) leader Edmund Stoiber famously remarked that "... this election is like a football match where it's the second half and my team is ahead by 2–0."

However, events soon overtook Stoiber and the CDU/CSU campaign. The SPD and the Greens were helped by broad support for its opposition to an invasion of Iraq, continued media attention on the CDU funding scandal and by Gerhard Schröder's personal popularity relative to the opposition's candidate for chancellor, Stoiber.

The SPD was also boosted by Schröder's swift response to the August floods in eastern Germany, as compared to Stoiber, who was on vacation and responded late to the events.

With Guido Westerwelle, leader of the Free Democratic Party (FDP), the FDP presented a chancellor candidate for the first time, usually a title reserved for the main election leaders of the SPD and CDU/CSU. This was met with general derision and Westerwelle was excluded from the chancellor television debate, the first one, against which he unsuccessfully sued.

== Contesting parties ==
The table below lists parties represented in the 14th Bundestag:

Name			Ideology	Lead candidate	1998 result	
Name			Ideology	Lead candidate	Party-list votes (%)	Seats
SPD		Social Democratic Party of Germany Sozialdemokratische Partei Deutschlands	Social democracy	Gerhard Schröder	40.9%	298 / 669
CDU/CSU	CDU	Christian Democratic Union of Germany; Christlich Demokratische Union Deutschlands	Christian democracy	Edmund Stoiber	28.4%	245 / 669
CDU/CSU	CSU	Christian Social Union in Bavaria (Note: The Christian Democratic Union and the Christian Social Union of Bavaria call themselves sister parties. They do not compete against each other in the same geographical regions and they form one group within the Bundestag.) Christlich-Soziale Union in Bayern	Christian democracy	Edmund Stoiber	6.7% (Note: CSU received 47.7% in Bavaria. It only fields candidates in Bavaria, where the CDU does not field candidates.)	245 / 669
Grüne		Alliance 90/The Greens Bündnis 90/Die Grünen	Green politics	Joschka Fischer	6.7%	47 / 669
FDP		Free Democratic Party Freie Demokratische Partei	Classical liberalism	Guido Westerwelle	6.2%	43 / 669
PDS		Party of Democratic Socialism Partei des Demokratischen Sozialismus	Socialism	Gabi Zimmer	5.1%	36 / 669

== Opinion polls ==

After a brief honeymoon period, the CDU/CSU overtook the SPD in opinion polling in early 1999. This dramatically reversed after the CDU donations scandal, and the SPD established a strong lead which it held throughout 2000 and 2001. The CDU/CSU retook first place at the beginning of election year, and combined with a strong FDP, the opposition held a clear lead over the SPD–Green incumbents through mid-August. Schröder's response to the floods that month buoyed the SPD's numbers, and put the CDU/CSU, FDP, and PDS on a downward trend. Polling during the final week of the campaign gave a narrow edge of the SPD, but also indicated the FDP would finish ahead of the Greens. Meanwhile, it was unclear if the PDS would win proportional seats, leaving the final outcome on a knife's edge.

Polling firm	Fieldwork date	Sample size	SPD	Union	Grüne	FDP	PDS	Others	Lead
2005 federal election	22 Sep 2002	–	38.5	38.5	8.6	7.4	4.0	3.0	0.01
Forsa	20 Sep 2002	2,021	38.5–39.5	37.0–38.0	6.5–7.5	7.0–8.0	4.0–4.5		0.5–2.5
Allensbach	20 Sep 2002		37.5	37.0	7.5	9.5	4.5	4.0	0.5
Allensbach	6–15 Sep 2002	~2,000	37.0	37.3	7.2	10.1	4.4	4.0	0.3
Emnid	14 Sep 2002	3,518	39	37	7	8	5	4	2
Forsa	9–14 Sep 2002	3,006	40	38	7	8	4	3	2
Forschungsgruppe Wahlen	9–12 Sep 2002	1,326	40.0	37.0	7.0	7.5	4.5	4.0	3.0
Infratest dimap	9–12 Sep 2002	2,000	38.5	36.0	8.0	8.5	4.7	4.3	2.5

== Results ==
Although most opposition parties gained seats, and the result was in doubt for most of the election night, the governing coalition retained a narrow majority. In particular, the SPD was able to partially offset declines in their vote share in the West with an increase in the East, with the PDS falling below both the 5% threshold and the 3-seat threshold, either of which is required to qualify a party for top-up seats. Consequently, the PDS held only two directly elected seats.

Party	Party-list			Constituency			Total seats	+/–
Party	Votes	%	Seats	Votes	%	Seats	Total seats	+/–
Social Democratic Party	18,488,668	38.52	80	20,059,967	41.93	171	251	−47
Christian Democratic Union	14,167,561	29.52	108	15,336,512	32.06	82	190	−8
Christian Social Union	4,315,080	8.99	15	4,311,178	9.01	43	58	+11
Alliance 90/The Greens	4,110,355	8.56	54	2,693,794	5.63	1	55	+8
Free Democratic Party	3,538,815	7.37	47	2,752,796	5.75	0	47	+4
Party of Democratic Socialism	1,916,702	3.99	0	2,079,203	4.35	2	2	−34
Party for a Rule of Law Offensive	400,476	0.83	0	120,330	0.25	0	0	New
The Republicans	280,671	0.58	0	55,947	0.12	0	0	0
National Democratic Party	215,232	0.45	0	103,209	0.22	0	0	0
Human Environment Animal Protection Party	159,655	0.33	0	8,858	0.02	0	0	0
The Grays – Gray Panthers	114,224	0.24	0	75,490	0.16	0	0	0
Party of Bible-abiding Christians	101,645	0.21	0	71,106	0.15	0	0	0
Ecological Democratic Party	56,898	0.12	0	56,593	0.12	0	0	0
Feminist Party	36,832	0.08	0	2,264	0.00	0	0	0
Family Party	30,045	0.06	0	15,138	0.03	0	0	0
Bürgerrechtsbewegung Solidarität	16,958	0.04	0	22,531	0.05	0	0	0
Christian Centre	15,440	0.03	0	2,413	0.01	0	0	0
Bavaria Party	9,379	0.02	0	6,757	0.01	0	0	0
Party for Pension Justice and Family	7,499	0.02	0	4,363	0.01	0	0	New
Departure for Civil Rights, Freedom and Health	4,697	0.01	0	2,895	0.01	0	0	New
Centre Party	3,127	0.01	0	1,823	0.00	0	0	0
Humanist Party	2,485	0.01	0	1,385	0.00	0	0	0
The Violets	2,412	0.01	0	840	0.00	0	0	New
Communist Party of Germany	1,624	0.00	0	686	0.00	0	0	0
German Social Union				6,003	0.01	0	0	0
German Communist Party				3,953	0.01	0	0	0
Freedom Party				2,003	0.00	0	0	0
Alliance for Germany				571	0.00	0	0	0
Independents and voter groups				43,116	0.09	0	0	0
Total	47,996,480	100.00	304	47,841,724	100.00	299	603	−66
Valid votes	47,996,480	98.79		47,841,724	98.47			
Invalid/blank votes	586,281	1.21		741,037	1.53			
Total votes	48,582,761	100.00		48,582,761	100.00			
Registered voters/turnout	61,432,868	79.08		61,432,868	79.08			
Source: Bundeswahlleiter

Seat results – SPD in red, Greens in green, PDS in purple, FDP in yellow, CDU/CSU in black

=== Results by state ===
Second vote (Zweitstimme, or votes for party list)

State results in %	SPD	CDU/CSU	GRÜNE	FDP	PDS	all others
Baden-Württemberg	33.5	42.8	11.4	7.8	1.0	3.5
Bavaria	26.1	58.6	7.6	4.5	0.7	2.5
Berlin	36.6	25.9	14.6	6.6	11.4	4.9
Brandenburg	46.4	22.3	4.5	5.8	17.2	3.8
Bremen	48.6	24.6	15.0	6.7	2.2	2.9
Hamburg	42.0	28.1	16.2	6.8	2.1	4.8
Hesse	39.7	37.1	10.7	8.2	1.3	3.0
Mecklenburg-Vorpommern	41.7	30.3	3.5	5.4	16.3	2.8
Lower Saxony	47.8	34.5	7.3	7.1	1.0	2.3
North Rhine-Westphalia	43.0	35.1	8.9	9.4	1.2	2.4
Rhineland-Palatinate	38.2	40.3	7.9	9.3	1.0	3.3
Saarland	46.0	35.0	7.6	6.4	1.4	3.6
Saxony	33.3	33.6	4.6	7.3	16.2	4.9
Saxony-Anhalt	43.2	29.0	3.4	7.6	14.4	2.4
Schleswig-Holstein	42.9	36.0	9.4	8.0	1.3	2.4
Thuringia	39.9	29.4	4.3	5.9	17.0	3.5

SPD vote

CDU/CSU vote

Green vote

FDP vote

PDS vote

==== Constituency seats ====
State	Total seats	Seats won				
State	Total seats	SPD	CDU	CSU	PDS	Grüne
Baden-Württemberg	37	7	30			
Bavaria	44	1		43		
Berlin	12	9			2	1
Brandenburg	10	10				
Bremen	2	2				
Hamburg	6	6				
Hesse	21	17	4			
Lower Saxony	29	25	4			
Mecklenburg-Vorpommern	7	5	2			
North Rhine-Westphalia	64	45	19			
Rhineland-Palatinate	15	7	8			
Saarland	4	4				
Saxony	17	4	13			
Saxony-Anhalt	10	10				
Schleswig-Holstein	11	10	1			
Thuringia	10	9	1			
Total	299	171	82	43	2	1

==== List seats ====
State	Total seats	Seats won				
State	Total seats	CDU	SPD	Grüne	FDP	CSU
Baden-Württemberg	39	4	20	9	6	
Bavaria	51		25	7	4	15
Berlin	11	6		3	2	
Brandenburg	6	4		1	1	
Bremen	2	1		1		
Hamburg	7	4		2	1	
Hesse	23	13	1	5	4	
Lower Saxony	34	18	6	5	5	
Mecklenburg-Vorpommern	3	2			1	
North Rhine-Westphalia	70	30	15	12	13	
Rhineland-Palatinate	15	5	5	2	3	
Saarland	5	3		1	1	
Saxony	12		8	2	2	
Saxony-Anhalt	8	6		1	1	
Schleswig-Holstein	11	7		2	2	
Thuringia	7	5		1	1	
Total	304	108	80	54	47	15

== Post-election ==
The coalition between the SPD and the Greens continued in government, with Schröder as chancellor. However, due to the slim majority in the Bundestag, the governing coalition was not stable.

== Sources ==
- The Federal Returning Officer
- Psephos
