= William Kaplan (disambiguation) =

William Kaplan is a Canadian lawyer and writer.

William Kaplan may also refer to:

- William Kaplan (comics)
- William B. Kaplan, American sound engineer
