= Airbus affair =

Alleged Canadian political scandal

The Airbus affair refers to allegations of secret commissions paid to Prime Minister Brian Mulroney and other members of his ministry in exchange for then-crown corporation Air Canada's purchase of a large number of Airbus jets. The Chairman of Airbus (a European consortium) at the time of the contract competition was Franz Josef Strauss (1915–1988), a high-profile German politician in Bavaria.

The order in question had long been pending, and both Boeing and Airbus had been competing heavily for the contract. Both offered shared production in Canada, and Boeing went so far as to buy de Havilland Canada to further strengthen their bargaining position, as well as gain access to the feederliner market where they, at that time, had no presence. The contract was eventually won by Airbus in 1988, with an order for 34 Airbus A320s, as well as the sale of some of Air Canada's existing Boeing 747 fleet. Boeing immediately put de Havilland up for sale, thereby putting that company in jeopardy, but the blame for this was generally placed on the government.

== RCMP allegations ==
In 1995, the Royal Canadian Mounted Police (RCMP) accused Mulroney and Frank Moores of accepting kickbacks from Karlheinz Schreiber on the sale of Airbus airplanes to the government-owned airline during Mulroney's time as Prime Minister of Canada. The allegations were made in a letter sent by the RCMP to the government of Switzerland seeking access to banking records. Schreiber had earlier raised money for Mulroney's successful 1983 bid to win the leadership of the Progressive Conservative Party.

Mulroney denied the allegations, and launched a $50 million defamation suit against the Canadian government, alleging that the newly elected Liberal government of Jean Chrétien was engaging in a smear campaign against its predecessor. The government settled out of court in early 1997, and agreed to publicly apologize to Mulroney, as well as paying the former prime minister's $2.1 million legal fees.

Although there is no evidence that Mulroney accepted kickbacks while prime minister, he acknowledged in 2003 that shortly after stepping down in 1993 that he accepted $225,000 over 18 months from Schreiber, in three cash payments of $75,000 each. Mulroney was still a member of the House of Commons of Canada when one of the payments was made. Mulroney claims that this money was paid to him for consulting services he rendered to help promote a fresh pasta business, and to develop international contacts for Schreiber. Mulroney had previously not admitted accepting any commissions from Schreiber during his lawsuit against the Canadian government, and later under oath specifically denied any business dealings with him. Mulroney did not provide evidence of any work he performed for that money, and declared it as income to Revenue Canada only years later, when Schreiber had come under criminal investigation in Germany. Schreiber ridiculed their dealings in pasta-macaroni as nothing more than being sent a single flyer, and has stated that the three separate payments were actually $100,000 each in $1000 bills, a total of $300,000.

== Media/journalistic coverage ==
Journalist Stevie Cameron wrote about the scandal, and Schreiber's links to the Mulroney government, in her 1994 best-selling book On the Take: Crime, Corruption and Greed in the Mulroney Years. The CBC's The Fifth Estate produced a documentary in March 1995 which revealed a secret side agreement between Airbus and a Liechtenstein shell company, International Aircraft Leasing (IAL), which received millions of dollars in secret commissions after the sale of Airbus aircraft to Air Canada. William Kaplan responded to Cameron and the CBC in his 1998 book Presumed Guilty, criticizing journalists for lacking evidence.

In October 1999, The Fifth Estate obtained Swiss Bank Corporation records which revealed that Schreiber had set up a secret bank account in Zürich with the code-name "BRITAN", from which three cash withdrawals totaling $300,000 were made in 1993 and 1994. Two years later, Cameron and Fifth Estate producer Harvey Cashore wrote a book about Schreiber called The Last Amigo. In 2004, Kaplan clarified his position in a further book, A Secret Trial, by criticizing Cameron for her role as a confidential RCMP informant on the Airbus matter, and Mulroney for not disclosing the fact that he had received the $300,000 from Schreiber.

On February 8, 2006, Schreiber stated in a Fifth Estate interview that the money from the "BRITAN" account came at the request of a Mulroney aide, who told him the former prime minister was short of funds. Schreiber mocked Mulroney's claim that the money was a consulting fee for help given in a pasta business Schreiber had invested in. The programme also reported there was no evidence that Mulroney knew of the source of the funds. The following year, The Globe and Mail and The Fifth Estate revealed that Brian Mulroney filed a voluntary disclosure with Revenue Canada several years after accepting the cash envelopes from Schreiber.

== Cash payments ==
The Globe and Mail reported on November 1, 2007, that Mulroney, who had by his own admission received $75,000 of Schreiber's stated $300,000 in cash in New York City in December 1994, should have declared those funds when he crossed the border into Canada several days later, if he had not already spent the money. The story quoted retired RCMP inspector Bruce Bowie, who played a role in preparing the original Canadian legislation requiring large cash transactions to be reported, which was passed during Mulroney's term. Internal United States rules also require that large cash transactions be recorded, and whether Mulroney did so for this transaction was an open question, according to the Globe and Mail article.

On November 8, 2007, an affidavit, including further allegations by Schreiber, was filed in court. Prime Minister Stephen Harper announced that a third-party independent inquiry would be launched to review the dealings between Schreiber and Mulroney, to be headed by David Lloyd Johnston, president of the University of Waterloo. The RCMP announced on November 14 that they would also open a review process into those matters. In June 2008, the government established the "Commission of Inquiry into Certain Allegations Respecting Business and Financial Dealings Between Karlheinz Schreiber and the Right Honourable Brian Mulroney".

Schreiber lost his appeal of extradition to Germany on November 15, and he remained confined in the Toronto area. Extradition proceedings against Schreiber, launched by German authorities, began in 1999; Schreiber was wanted in Germany to answer for several criminal charges, including fraud and bribery, which had a role in bringing down a government there, and which damaged the legacy of former German Chancellor Helmut Kohl. Schreiber stated that if extradited, he would not cooperate with the inquiry. Minister of Public Safety Stockwell Day said that the inquiry would be structured to allow witnesses to testify regardless of their location, and that Schreiber would have to testify. Opposition parties in the House of Commons called for Schreiber's extradition to be delayed, to allow him to take part in the inquiry. Minister of Justice Rob Nicholson promised to delay the extradition until at least December 1, 2007, to allow potential appeals to be filed by Schreiber's lawyer Edward Greenspan.

== Ethics Committee testimony ==
Schreiber was summoned from jail by a Speaker's Warrant issued by Commons Speaker Peter Milliken, and was transported from Toronto to Ottawa on November 28, 2007. He testified before the House of Commons Ethics Committee on November 29, December 4, and December 6, 2007. Schreiber obtained a stay of his extradition from the Ontario Court of Appeal on November 30, and obtained bail on December 4 by posting $1.3 million. Schreiber explained that the $300,000 he paid to Mulroney in three cash installments of $100,000 each, in 1993 and 1994, did not come directly from Airbus, but was drawn from 'success fees', money Schreiber earned in commissions for his lobbying work on behalf of Airbus, MBB, and Thyssen, in the late 1980s and early 1990s. Airbus and MBB had concluded large contracts, for airplanes and helicopters respectively, with the Canadian government while Mulroney was prime minister. Thyssen's project, a prospective new factory for manufacturing light armoured vehicles, had gained initial government approval, but was never built. Schreiber explained further that the money he paid to Mulroney was not for any work Mulroney did while he was prime minister from 1984 to 1993, but was a retainer for future work Mulroney would do for Schreiber after he left political office, as well as a reward for Mulroney's support for German reunification, which was achieved in 1991. This amount was originally set for $500,000, but was reduced because Mulroney did not in fact perform the work, according to Schreiber, who is suing Mulroney to recover that money. Mulroney refused to comment in advance of his scheduled appearance before the Ethics Committee on December 13, 2007. However, six weeks following his appearance, Mulroney's lawyers submitted a letter to the Ethics Committee chairman, Paul Szabo, indicating that their client would not be willing to appear again before the committee because of the "unfair" treatment he encountered on December 13. On February 26, 2008, CTV News reported that Mulroney, through his lawyer, had reiterated his refusal to reappear before the committee, scheduled for February 28. After mulling the possibility of issuing a subpoena, the committee decided the next day that it would wrap up this activity without further testimony. During the hearings, it was revealed that all the Mulroney children's university education was paid from the money that their father received from Schreiber.

On February 14, 2008, Schreiber's Swiss accountant told the Ethics Committee that he did in fact set up a Swiss account for Mulroney. He denied knowing about transactions made on that account by or for the former Prime Minister.

== Oliphant Commission report ==
In April and May 2009, the next episode ensued as the Oliphant Commission inquiry began. Chaired by Mr Justice Jeffrey Oliphant, Associate Chief Justice of the Court of Queen's Bench of Manitoba, it was specifically mandated to focus on the dealings between Schreiber and Mulroney. While the inquisitors and their questions were different, the answers by Schreiber in April and Mulroney in May were essentially paraphrasings and expansions on those of the Ethics Committee proceedings. Notable new revelations in Mulroney's testimonies included his explanation for the delay in declaring the cash payments as income (he considered them as advances on future activities, to be declared only when drawn upon), and that his accountant, without his knowledge, had arranged to pay tax on only half the amount. This was in accordance with a Canada Revenue Agency amnesty incentive, now discontinued, that was intended to encourage delinquent taxpayers to submit late declarations, thus garnering funds which would otherwise have been lost or, at minimum, require costly legal action to be collected.

The Commission completed its hearings phase in the last week of July 2009. The following weekend Schreiber, after a last-ditch effort to find another means of avoiding extradition, was ordered to appear at the Toronto Detention Centre pending his return to Germany. Within three hours, he was escorted onto a Europe-bound aircraft by two RCMP officers, and designated "surrendered to Germany".

The commission's report, released on May 31, 2010, included the following findings:

- That Mulroney entered into an agreement with Schreiber while Mulroney was a Member of Parliament, but not while still prime minister
- That Schreiber retained Mulroney to promote the sale of military vehicles in the international market (not within Canada), that three cash payments totaling at least CAD $225,000 were made by Schreiber to Mulroney in person, and that no services were ever provided by Mulroney for the monies paid
- That these business and financial dealings were inappropriate given Mulroney's position and that Mulroney repeatedly acted inappropriately in disclosure and reporting of the dealings and payments

The report intentionally avoids "expressing any conclusions ... regarding civil or criminal liability" based on the commission's mandate and Oliphant wrote that he was "careful not to use language that would even hint at such a finding."

== See also ==
- Lockheed bribery scandals
