= 2018 York University strike =

143-day strike by CUPE Local 3903

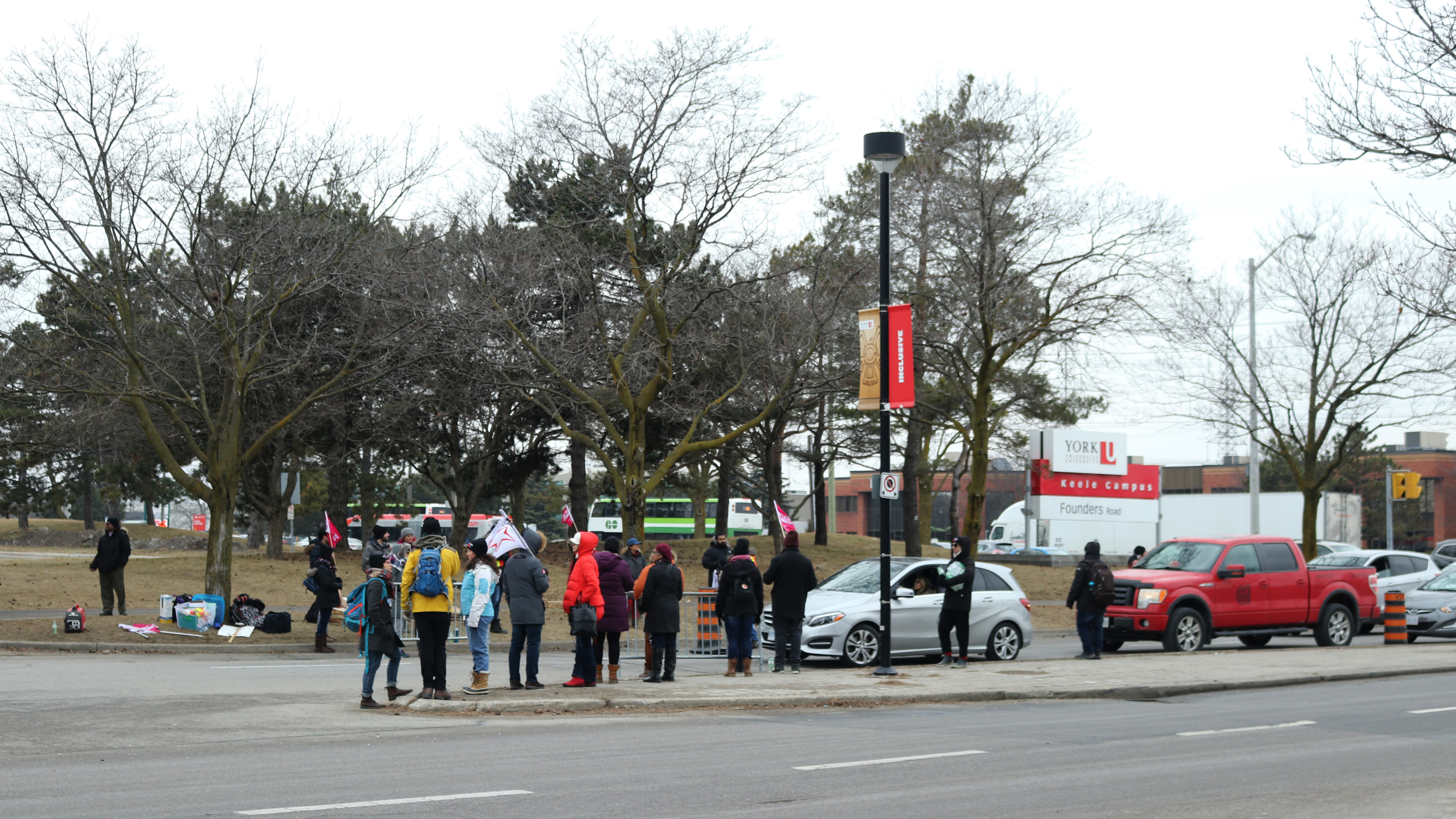
- A picket line at the Founders Road entrance to York University's Keele Campus
- Date: March 5, 2018 – July 25, 2018 (143 days)
- Location: Toronto
- Caused by: Contract expiry
- Goals: Job security for contract faculty; Funding protection for teaching assistants; Workplace accessibility and equity
- Methods: Picketing; Occupation; Demonstrations; Internet activism; Walkout
- Status: Unsettled
- Result: Legislated back to work by the Ontario Government

Parties
York University Administration Supported by: Hicks Morley Law Firm	CUPE Local 3903; Supported by: Students for CUPE 3903

Lead figures
Rhonda Lenton (President); Barry Miller (Senior Policy Advisor on Labour Relations); Leanne DeFilippis (Executive Director of Faculty Relations); Simon Mortimer (Head Lawyer for York University)	Devin Lefebvre (Chairperson); Hossein Banitabaei (Vice-President of Unit 1)

Number
Unknown	3,700

The 2018 York University strike was a strike by CUPE Local 3903, the union representing contract professors, teaching assistants, and graduate assistants at York University. At 143 days long it is the longest strike in the post-secondary sector in Canadian history, surpassing the previous record of the 1976 Laval University 108-day strike. It ended on July 25, when the Ontario Legislature passed the Urgent Priorities Act back-to-work legislation.

== Background ==
On March 3, 2018, two days before the beginning of the strike, York University stated in a labour update that if all of CUPE 3903's 110 proposals were accepted, operating labour costs would increase by 57%, up from $70 million to $109 million over three years, out of a total spending of $715 million in labour costs annually. In this case, the $39 million difference between contracts (an additional $13 million per year) would not be possible given York University's annual surplus of only $36.4 million; otherwise, roughly 1/3rd of the annual surplus would be spent on CUPE 3903, which only represents 60% of teachers on campus, thus limiting York's ability to invest in capital projects. For these reasons, York University stated that "after extensive discussion Friday evening and following careful review of CUPE 3903's lengthy and largely unchanged list of demands shared through the mediator, CUPE 3903's positions remain too far apart from the University's best offer to return to bargaining at this time." At this point, both parties understood that a strike was imminent. York declared that the university would "remain open" and that certain classes would continue running.

On the Friday of March 2, the newly founded Students Against Strike organized a small walk-out demonstration and demanded that undergraduate students deserved their own platform in the conflict between York University Administration and CUPE 3903.

== The strike ==
The strike began on March 5, 2018, at 12:01 am EST. Despite the strike, the university remained open (with all major entrances blockaded via hard picket lines), and the few winter term courses that were able to continue, continued to run. Winter term ended on April 23 as originally scheduled. Students that refused to participate in academic activities during the labour disruption were promised reasonable accommodations.

=== Attempted bargaining ===
On March 12, 2018, the Minister of Advanced Education and Skills Development, Mitzie Hunter, contacted CUPE 3903 and the York University administration to encourage the two sides to bargain. CUPE 3903 re-affirmed its willingness to bargain.

After little movement from either side, on March 18, 2018, York University announced that it would return to the bargaining table. CUPE 3903 was optimistic that the disruption might be resolved but expressed disappointment when York, despite movement from CUPE 3903, issues an ultimatum to capitulate on all important issues, or York walks away from the table.

On March 20, York University presented a revised offer and exercised their statutory power to force a one-time mandatory ratification vote. York made its request on March 27, but the law stipulates a two-week delay between request and vote. The vote was held between April 6 and April 9. The university's offer was rejected by 85% of those who voted, with 2,320 "no" votes cast. With the ratification vote defeated, the strike continued. According to CUPE, the proposal under consideration was not meaningfully different from the offer that they rejected at the beginning of the strike.

CUPE 3903 subsequently filed an unfair labor practices complaint with the Ontario Labour Relations Board. The complaint alleged that York publicly mischaracterized CUPE 3903 demands, incorrectly characterized the demands as illegal, and during a previous labour disruption appropriated the domain name CUPE3903.com to direct internet searches for information on CUPE to the university's own labour page. York responded that the objections were without merit.

CUPE 3903 would learn that "CUPE3903.com" was billed to York University by Michael Schiff, an employee in the office of the Faculty of Graduate Studies.

During the strike, a coalition of socialist student groups, Students for CUPE 3903, staged an occupation of the University Senate chambers in support of the strike. The sit-in lasted three months. Participants protested potential expense account issues from Lenton's term as Vice President Academic and President, in addition to various other tuition-oriented concerns. Simultaneously, a website publishing documents relating to Lenton's expenses, Yorked.me, was registered under a false identity. Yorked.me was taken down following a copyright complaint from the university, but resurfaced as Yorked.tk, using a free domain name.

Early demands from Students for CUPE 3903 included the cancellation of classes that were not taught by CUPE 3903 members. The ultimate authority to make academic policy (of which disruption policy is a part), according to the York Act, rests with York's Senate. According to YUFA, the union representing full-time faculty (full-time faculty are not represented by CUPE): "Senate Executive clearly asserted that course directors are the best judge of how to ensure the academic integrity of their courses and whether those courses can be continued on that basis." President Rhonda Lenton and the Board of Governors asserted that it was their right to decide whether classes should be suspended or not and decided that there was no reason to do so. Many classes taught by members of York's full-time faculty continued, though many of these classes experienced varying levels of disruption ranging from marking not being completed to classes being suspended entirely. Classes taught by contract faculty were already suspended owing to their instructors being on strike. Lenton and the Board of Governor's move to take control of academic policy from the Senate received the unanimous censure of the Canadian Association of University Teachers (CAUT), an organization representing most all academic staff in Canada. According to CAUT, not only was this in contravention with past practice, but it was also in contravention of the York Act, the act of the Legislature of Ontario that created York University.

=== Incidents of violence ===
Student kicking a CUPE 3903 teaching assistant after breaking free from being restrained.

Minor incidents of violence occurred as students were stopped at picket lines. A video was released by picketers showing a student dismantling barricades at the Northwest Gate picket line in an attempt to attend his Midterm exam. The student was placed in a chokehold by a picketer, upon breaking free the student kicked the picketer in retaliation. A picketer was injured after a vehicle forced its way past a picket line. Protesters demonstrated outside a university senate meeting and attempted to prevent senators from entering. During the melee, a teaching assistant senator was put in a headlock by security and prevented from entering. CUPE 3903 protestors picketed at the house of York University President Rhonda Lenton.

=== Province launches Industrial Inquiry Commission ===
On April 13, 2018, Kevin Flynn, Minister of Labour, appointed labour relations lawyer William Kaplan as the sole member of an Industrial Inquiry Commission. The purpose of such an inquiry is to create a report on the status of a labour dispute, for the minister, and in the process bring the two sides in a dispute together.

CUPE revised their offer, with more concessions in favour of the employer. York University in its submission to the inquiry argues that CUPE 3903 is too radical to bargain with, and cites the writings of some of its members (all academics) as proof of a "mentality" that York cannot negotiate with. From the start of the labour disruption, York University adopted a hard line on its offer, and urged CUPE to accept it, or agree to arbitration.

At the conclusion of the inquiry, Kaplan noted in his report that "the parties have reached an impasse and there is no reason to believe that they will be able to resolve their dispute through free collective bargaining. Their history indicates otherwise." Kaplan recommended to the Minister that he call upon the parties to enter into "consensual interest arbitration." Kaplan further recommended that "the government establish a task force on precarity in post-secondary education employment."

The precise date that the report was made available to the province, the University and CUPE 3903 was not certain. However, details of the report (which was meant primarily for the Minister) were leaked to the press and made public on Friday May 4, 2018. CUPE 3903 maintained its position that bargaining and not arbitration was the means to resolve the impasse.

While praising Commissioner Kaplan's recommendation for the creation of a government task force on precarity in postsecondary education employment, the Ontario Federation of University Faculty Associations condemned York and Kaplan's position that arbitration was the answer and that CUPE 3903 should be legislated back to work. In addition to undermining collective bargaining "such legislation subverts the bargaining process by signalling to employers that they can avoid meaningful engagement in collective bargaining by stonewalling and waiting for government intervention."

Leading up to the Industrial Commission, York University claimed that its bargaining priorities had the support of York's academics, without reference or substantiation. The York University Faculty Association objected, and noted that the only basis for this claim was an open letter in support of these prioritise by a group of 152 full-time academics, which YUFA notes comprises 10% of its members. While not claiming that YUFA members are unanimous about various issues at stake in the labour dispute, YUFA rejected the idea that its membership was in favour of the University's position in the labour dispute. One signatory of the letter, Rose Steele, a professor in the School of Nursing, claimed that fear of "retributions" from CUPE 3903 and YUFA were suppressing public dissent among CUPE and YUFA members.

=== Summer Terms disrupted ===
On April 19, York University published a statement warning that S2 term (June–August) would be cancelled if the strike continued past April 30. On May 2, York University published a statement announcing they would commence the summer term (SU and S1 terms) on May 22. S2 term was cancelled.

On May 7, York University issued an ultimatum to CUPE3903. The university demanded that CUPE accept a revised offer by May 10 at 11:59 EDT, or the university will not implement a back-to-work backpay protocols and would not offer employment to members of striking CUPE units during the summer term. CUPE rejected the university's demands and on May 10, issued a limited-time offer of a "framework for settlement" expiring May 14.

On July 15, 2018, the strike continued. Criticism among students has been directed at both CUPE 3903 and York University President Rhonda Lenton's poor handling of the dispute.

=== Attempted back-to-work legislation ===
In light of Kaplan's recommendation, on May 7, the Ontario government introduced Bill 70, the York University Labour Disputes Resolution Act, 2018. The bill was introduced the day before the Legislature was set to be dissolved in preparation for the 2018 Ontario general election. Opposition from the Ontario NDP slowed the passage of the bill through first reading; it was eventually carried with division. The bill died before a second or third reading could be conducted after the government dissolved the Legislature earlier than expected. With the dissolution of the Legislature, the outcome of any legislation would be made after the 2018 Ontario general election.

=== Unit 2 accepts offer ===
On June 14 and June 15, Unit 2 members of CUPE 3903 held a ratification vote on an offer for Unit 2 sent by York University on June 6. CUPE 3903 condemned the offer as "backroom dealings of certain members of the [Unit 2] Bargaining Team." The vote came after the results of a previous vote on the same offer were rejected over alleged irregularities. 231 Yes votes were cast, while 122 No votes were cast. Following the vote, York University announced that Unit 2 members would return to work on the following Monday, June 18. CUPE 3903 stated that other bargaining units would remain on strike.

=== New back-to-work legislation ===
On July 16, 2018, the newly elected 42nd Parliament of Ontario introduced Bill 2 into the legislature, formally called the Urgent Priorities Act. The omnibus bill included a clause to end the labour dispute at York University. Premier Ford argued that the back-to-work legislation was for the sake of the students, claiming that they were "the only people getting hurt" in the conflict between CUPE 3903 and York Administration. The chairman of CUPE 3903, Devin Lefebvre, spoke out against the legislation claiming that it was a violation of workers rights. On July 25, 2018, Bill 2 received Royal Assent, effectively ending the York Strike. The legislation gives the government the power to fine members of the York union $2,000 each day and fines the Union $25,000 for each day it continues to strike. Back-to-work-legislation had influenced how some students voted in the 2018 Ontario general election and many were relieved that the strike was finally over.

== Criticism of York University's handling of the strike ==
By May 2, 2018, several faculties and student groups at York University passed votes of non-confidence in Rhonda Lenton, President of York, and the Board of Governors for creating a crisis of governance and for their handling of the strike. The faculties include Glendon College, the Faculty of Education, the Faculty of Environmental Studies, and the Faculty of Liberal Arts & Professional Studies (LAPS), not to mention York University Graduate Students' Association (YUGSA), and a number of departments and student associations. As noted by YUFA, almost half of York's full-time faculty teaches in the Faculty of Liberal Arts and Professional Studies, implying that altogether, representative bodies of about (if not more than) half of York's faculty have lost confidence in York's administration.

Concerned academics and some student groups (including York's own full-time Faculty Association) continued to support CUPE 3903 with a call to York to return to the bargaining table.

According to Richard Wellen, York University Faculty Association (YUFA) president, at the time of a press conference bringing together representatives from YUFA, the Ontario Federation of Labour, and York University's Graduate Student Association, it was "becoming clearer every day that the major reason for the continuation of this strike is the categorical refusal of the administration and board of governors to bargain with the union." He noted that the administration refused to make a new offer to the union, and that it habitually blamed the union for the strike by way of refusing to acknowledge that many union priorities were previously agreed to in bargaining three years ago. Wellen also observed that "the administration is determined to break the union and is putting that desire ahead of university and student interests"

CUPE 3903 added that York Administration had; attempted to replace bargaining with a public relations campaign, misrepresented union processes, had red lines that it refuses to discuss, and that it had decided to not put students first in its labour dispute.

== See also ==
- 2008–09 York University strike
- York University
