= Suetes =

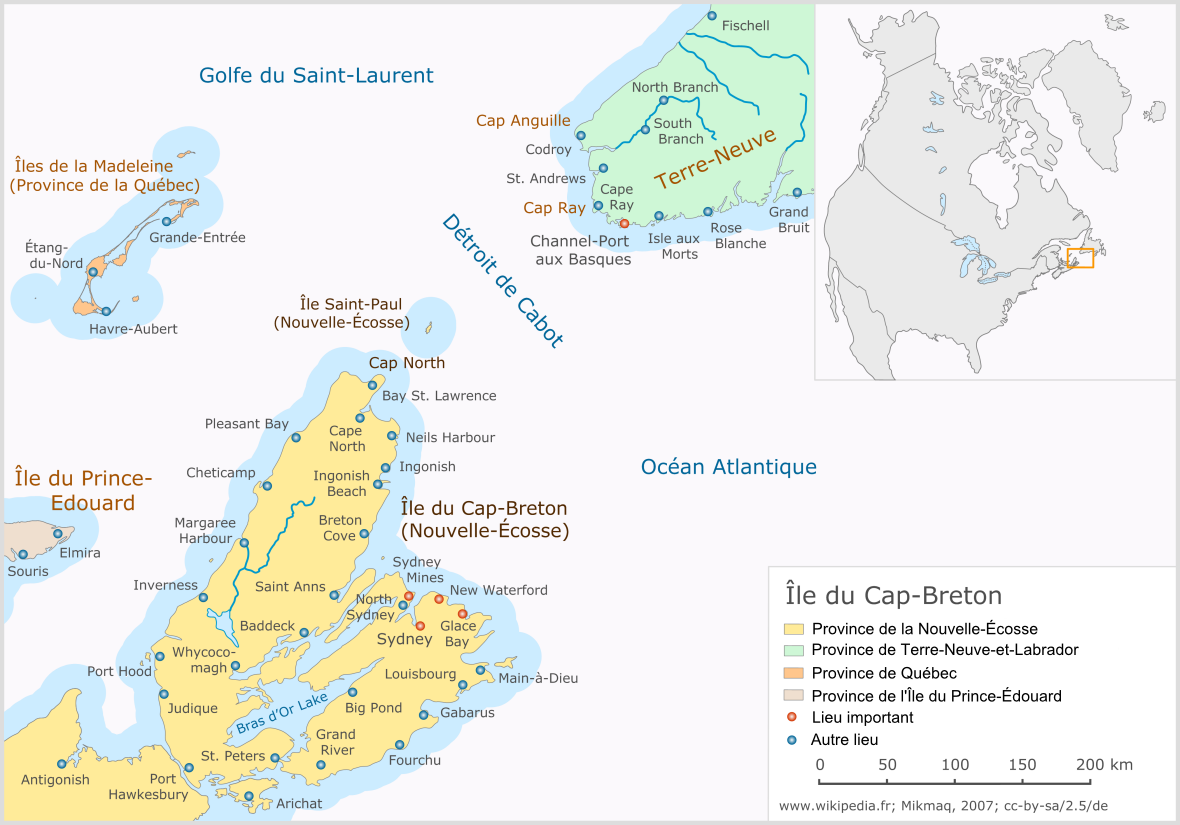
Suêtes are blowing at the base of the western peninsula of Cape Breton (yellow).

Suetes, suêtes, les suêtes, are strong south-east foehn winds on the west coast of Cape Breton Island, Canada. The term suête originates from the Acadian French inhabitants of the Chéticamp area as a contraction of sud est 'south-east'.

The western edge of the Cape Breton Highlands plateau slopes abruptly down to sea level from approximately 400 metres (1,300 ft) altitude. South-easterly winds lift on the east side of the island and flow across the plateau, frequently accelerating to high velocities on the steep downslope in stable airmass condition. The weather station at Grand Etang has recorded wind speeds of over 200 kilometres per hour (120 mph) on several occasions.
