= York University Faculty Association =

Trade union at York University

- Abbreviation: YUFA
- Founded: 1976; 50 years ago
- Headquarters: 4700 Keele St., Toronto, Ontario
- Location: Canada
- Members: 1650
- President: Ellie Perkins
- Key people: J. L. Granatstein
- Affiliations: CAUT, CLC, OFL, OCUFA
- Website: Official website

The York University Faculty Association (YUFA) is the professional association and trade union for full-time faculty, librarians, archivists and post-doctoral visitors at York University in Toronto, Ontario. Faculty at Osgoode Hall Law School are not members; they are in the smaller Osgoode Hall Faculty Association.

== History ==
The York University Faculty Association was founded in the fall of 1962 during disagreements on campus over the leadership of Murray Ross, then president of York. Though it was not a union, it threatened some job actions in the 1960s, and in 1972 worked to defend its members in the face of threatened budget cuts because of a financial crisis.

YUFA became a union and certified bargaining agent in 1976, in the "first wave of faculty unionization" in Canada. It was the fourth faculty union in Ontario. A "key figure" was historian J. L. Granatstein, who was "determined to help turn YUFA into a certified bargaining agent" when he became its chair in 1975. Some faculty, especially at the law school, challenged the certification; Granatstein found this "frustrating" and resigned early in 1977 before his term was finished. In January 1977 the Ontario Supreme Court dismissed the attempt to have the certification quashed.

== Structure and governance ==
YUFA's elected officers comprise the president, two vice-presidents, two chief stewards, two equity officers, the communications officer, the treasurer, and the recording secretary. They and some others sit on the executive committee.

Recognized causes include the Disability Caucus, Indigenous Caucus, Indigenous Queer Caucus, Queer Caucus, and Race Equity Caucus.

YUFA staff are members of CUPE Local 1281. On October 27th, 2025, YUFA's staff went on strike after five months of bargaining a new collective agreement with YUFA. The staff allege they "have been pushed to strike" because YUFA has refused to bargain with CUPE 1281 "unless [CUPE 1281] accepts the contracting-out of their own work to non-unionized workers", and that YUFA is union busting. YUFA denies allegations of union busting.

== Strikes ==
YUFA has had two strikes. The first began on 8 October 1985, where the main issues were compensation and mandatory retirement. It ended after only two days.

The second began on 20 March 1997 and lasted fifty-five days, making it the longest academic strike in English Canada to that time. The main issues were compensation, workload and class sizes, equity, and the ability to work past the normal retirement age of 65, a right that York eliminated the year before. On 13 May the membership voted 75% in favour of a deal, and returned to work the next day. Some members with low retirement income would be able to work up to age 69. The administration could name "distinguished" faculty who could work past 65. Within a few years this issue became moot, when mandatory retirement rules were eliminated in Ontario. Historian Michiel Horn says in his history York University: The Way Must Be Tried that the strike "created major problems for students and damaged York’s reputation."

There have been several other labour disruptions at York. In the 2018 York University strike it was CUPE 3093 (contract faculty, teaching assistants and graduate assistants) who were on strike, not YUFA, but it "caused tensions on campus between the administration and CUPE 3903 and the York University Faculty Association."

== Bibliography ==
- "Mandatory retirement fades in Canada". Canadian Broadcasting Corporation. CBC News. 18 February 2010.
- Briskin, Linda; Newson, Janice (Spring 1999). "Making Equity a Priority: Anatomy of the York University Strike of 1997". Feminist Studies. 25 (1): 105–118. JSTOR 3216673.
- Chiose, Simona (16 June 2018). "Part-time professors at York University will return to work Monday". Globe and Mail. p. A18. ProQuest 2606135122.
- Galt, Virginia (14 May 1997). "York professors accept compromise settlement: Deal ends one of longest strikes in Canadian university history, but power struggle between administration and faculty group continues". Globe and Mail. p. A12. ProQuest 1140585337.
- Horn, Michiel (2009). York University: The Way Must Be Tried. McGill-Queen's University Press. JSTOR j.ctt80266.
- Kruchio, Agnes (10 April 1976). "York faculty granted status, forms union". Globe and Mail. p. 4.
- Kruchio, Agnes (20 January 1977). "Court upholds York union for faculty". Globe and Mail. p. 45.
- Polanyi, Margaret (8 October 1985). "Full-time faculty involved York professors walk out in dispute over salaries". Globe and Mail. p. A17. ProQuest 386243259.
- Ross, Stephanie; Savage, Larry; Watson, James (January 2020). "Interrogating the Relationship Between Bargaining Structures and Bargaining Outcomes for Contract Academic Faculty in Ontario". Labour/Le Travail (86). doi:10.1353/llt.2020.0035.
- Small, Peter (18 March 1997a). "York professors, librarians poised to strike tomorrow". Toronto Star. p. A6.
- Small, Peter (14 May 1997b). "York U professors head back to class Staff vote 75% to end 55-day strike". Toronto Star. p. A6.
- Taylor, Sterling (10 October 1985). "Settlement ends York U professors' strike". Toronto Star. p. A6.
- "Bylaws". York University Faculty Association. 2021.
- "Constitution". York University Faculty Association. 2019.
- "York University Faculty Association". York University Faculty Association.
