= 2008–2009 York University strike =

Labour dispute in Toronto, Ontario, Canada

2008 York University strike
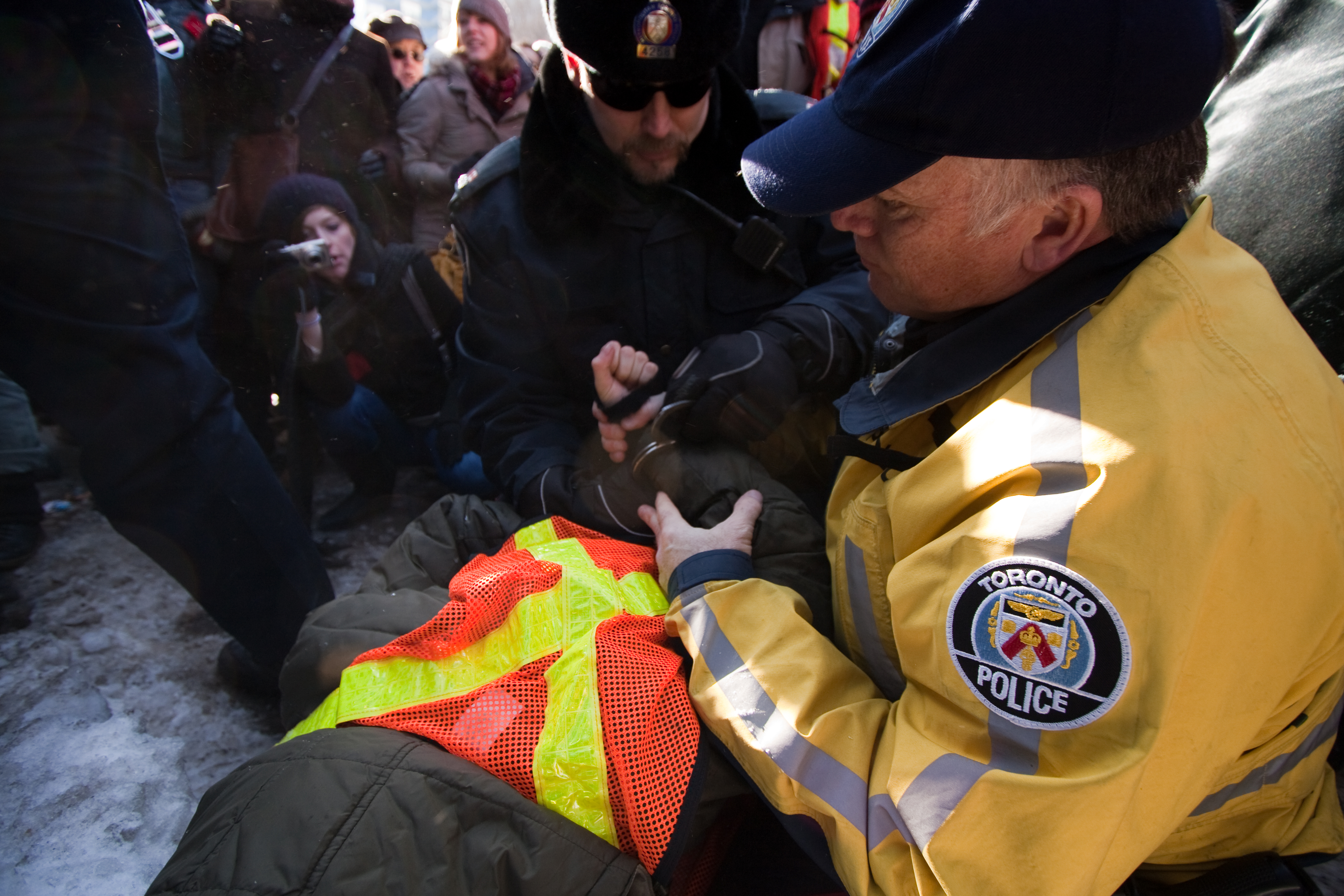
- A CUPE 3903 picketer is arrested during a protest against back to work legislation on January 26th, 2009. It was one of the final sizable protests before the end of the strike
- Date: 2008–2009 (128 days)
- Location: Toronto
- Caused by: Contract expiry
- Methods: Demonstrations; Internet activism; Walkout
- Status: Settled

Parties
| CUPE Local 3903 | York University Administration |

Lead figures
| | Mamdouh Shoukri; Rhonda Lenton |

Casualties
- Arrested: 1

The 2008–2009 York University strike was a strike by CUPE Local 3903, the union representing contract professors, teaching assistants, and graduate assistants at York University.

== History ==
The strike began on November 4, 2008, and concluded on January 29, 2009, when the provincial parliament legislated the union back to work. The strike lasted for 85 days, making it the longest academic strike in English-speaking Canada to that time, only surpassed by the subsequent 2018 York University strike. 5000 students, including the Schulich School of Business and the Osgoode Hall Law School, were able to return to school a week prior to the end of the strike due to a deal struck by the union and the university. Much of the criticism focused on CUPE 3903 and York University President Mamdouh Shoukri's poor handling of the dispute.

The Union went on strike due to a variety of institutional grievances, including job security for contract professors, elimination of the Non-Academic Student Code of Conduct, creation of whistleblower protection, and fund indexation. On January 20, 2009, CUPE 3903 defeated a forced ratification vote that would have ended the strike. On January 24, Ontario premier Dalton McGuinty announced a rare Sunday recall of the provincial legislature in order to pass back-to-work legislation mandating an immediate end to the strike. On January 29, the York University Labour Disputes Resolution Act was passed in the provincial parliament on a count of 42–8 ending the strike.

== Additional labour disruptions at York University ==
York University has a history of faculty and teaching assistant strikes. In 1997, there was a faculty strike by YUFA that lasted seven weeks. At the time, this was the second longest strike in Canadian University history. Key issues in the strike included retirement, funding, and institutional governance.

In 2001, teaching assistants and contract faculty went on strike for 11 weeks, when the university broke its own record. The central issue in the 2001 disruption was the administration's proposed attempts to remove tuition indexation language.

=== 2008 CUPE 3903 strike ===
A strike beginning on 6 November 2008 concerned a variety of institutional grievances, including job security for contract professors, elimination of the Non-Academic Student Code of Conduct, creation of whistleblower protection, and fund indexation. On 20 January 2009, CUPE 3903 defeated a forced ratification vote that would have ended the strike. On 24 January, Ontario premier Dalton McGuinty announced a rare Sunday recall of the provincial legislature in order to pass back-to-work legislation mandating an immediate end to the strike. On 29 January, the York University Labour Disputes Resolution Act was passed in the provincial parliament on a count of 42–8 ending the long 85-day strike and setting a precedent for future university strikes in Ontario.

=== 2015 CUPE 3903 strike ===
An additional strike by teaching assistants, contract faculty, and graduate assistants took place throughout March 2015. When the strike began, on 2 March, the university cancelled nearly all classes because about two-thirds of York courses were taught by the striking contract faculty at the time. On 10 March, the contract faculty ratified a new agreement, but the teaching assistants and graduate assistants rejected tentative agreements the bargaining team had reached with the university. The teaching assistants and graduate assistants, continued their strike until the end of the month. Contract faculty did not go back to work in support of the union and classes remained cancelled. The union reached a tentative agreement with the university on 29 March 2015, which was ratified on 31 March 2015, thus putting an immediate end to the 29-day strike. Faiz Ahmed, then Chair of CUPE 3903, highlighted the gains in the new agreement: “This agreement represents a near-total win for our members and will make York a leader with respect to equity issues.” The agreement included improvements to wages and benefits, indexation of tuition, and a plan for the university to add LGBTQ people to their employment equity policies.

=== 2018 CUPE 3903 strike ===
Units 1, 2, and 3 of CUPE Local 3903, the union represented by teaching assistants, contract faculty, and graduate assistants, began striking on Monday, 5 March 2018; several months after their previous collective agreement expired on 31 August 2017. The union's aim was to, in their words, "secure a fair collective agreement that, among other things, protected quality education and creates a less precarious working environment in Ontario's university sector". The main issues of the strike revolved around job security and the path to permanent tenured employment for contract faculty. A forced ratification vote was held between 6–9 April and was rejected by an overwhelming majority by all three units. On 13 June, a ratification vote was held for Unit 2 members, where the union executives recommended voting against the university's offer. The results of the vote were thrown out due to the fact that there were more ballots cast than signatures of eligible voters. A re-vote was held on 14 and 15 June, where Unit 2 ratified the university's offer, with 239 members voting in favour, and 122 opposed. Units 1 and 3 remained on strike until 25 July, when the newly formed 42nd Parliament of Ontario led by Premier Doug Ford passed back-to-work legislation via the Urgent Priorities Act, ending the strike after 143 days, making it the longest strike in the post-secondary sector in Canadian history.

=== 2024 CUPE 3903 strike ===
After avoiding a strike in 2021, Units 1, 2, and 3 of CUPE 3903 went on strike beginning Monday, 26 February 2024. As in previous years, the union was focused on job stability for contract faculty and wage increases for all three units.

The wage issue was twofold. In the renewal collective bargaining agreement, covering 2023 through 2026, the union hoped to win wage increases matching record inflation. In addition, the provincial government passed Bill 124 in 2019, which limited public sector raises to 1% annually. The Court of Appeal for Ontario ruled that Bill 124 violated the right of unions under the Canadian Charter of Rights and Freedoms to collectively bargain, upholding a lower court's ruling. Rather than further appeal the decision to the Supreme Court, the Ford government instead decided to repeal the law in its entirety, allowing CUPE 3903 and other public sector unions in Ontario to negotiate for retroactive wage increases for the three years that Bill 124 was in effect.

On 14 April, CUPE 3903 and York University announced that they had reached a tentative agreement. The agreement was ratified by CUPE 3903's membership on 19 April, ending the strike after 53 days with the union's members returning to work on Monday, 22 April 2024.

== Future labour disruptions at York University ==
Members of CUPE 3903 held further strikes in 2015 and 2018 and 2024 at York University after failing to reach an agreement with the university.

== See also ==
- 2018 York University strike
