= Stevie Cameron =

Canadian investigative journalist and author (1943–2024)

Stevie Cameron CM
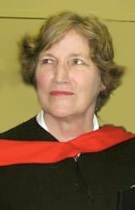
- Cameron in 2004
- Born: Stephanie Graham Dahl; October 11, 1943; Belleville, Ontario, Canada
- Died: August 31, 2024 (aged 80)
- Occupations: Journalist, writer
- Spouse: David Cameron
- Children: 2 (Tassie Cameron)
- Writing career
- Period: 1977–2012
- Notable works: Ottawa Inside Out; On the Take: Crime, Corruption and Greed in the Mulroney Years; Blue Trust; The Pickton File

Stevie Cameron CM (née Dahl; October 11, 1943 – August 31, 2024) was a Canadian investigative journalist and author. She worked for various newspapers such as the Toronto Star and The Globe and Mail. She co-hosted the investigative news television program, The Fifth Estate, on CBC-TV in the 1990s. She was also an author of non-fiction books, including On the Take (1994) about former prime minister Brian Mulroney. Her exposé on Mulroney and the Airbus Affair led to many legal battles including a judicial hearing to determine if she was an RCMP confidential informant: she was not. The fact that Mulroney did take a substantial amount of money while still in government was confirmed in the 2010 Oliphant report. Her final books dealt with the disappearance and the killing of several Indigenous women in the Vancouver area in the mid-1990s to the turn of this century. These murders were ultimately attributed to convicted serial killer Robert Pickton. She won the 2011 Arthur Ellis Award for best non-fiction crime book for her work on the Pickton case. Besides being a journalist and author, she was also a humanitarian, helping start programs for the underprivileged and homeless such as Second Harvest and the Out of the Cold program. For her lifetime work as a writer and humanitarian, she was invested into the Order of Canada in 2013.

== Early life ==
Stephanie Graham Dahl, most commonly known as Stevie, even as a child, was born on October 11, 1943, in Belleville, Ontario. Her father was Harold Edward "Whitey" Dahl, a mercenary American pilot who fought in the Spanish Republican Air Force during the Spanish Civil War. He came to Canada in 1940, and the next year, married her mother, the former Eleanor Roblin Bone, in Belleville. Eleanor's father, Jameson Bone, was a former mayor of Belleville. Post-war, the whole family moved to Switzerland in 1952 because Whitey Dahl was employed as a pilot by Swiss Air. He was fired in 1953 after he was charged with stealing gold and for having an affair with a Swiss Air hostess. Eleanor separated from Whitey because of his affair with the hostess. The family then moved back to Canada, with Eleanor and the children going to back to Belleville, while Whitey flew as a bush pilot in Canada's north. Whitey Dahl died while piloting a bush plane in Labrador on February 14, 1956, leaving Eleanor widowed and the children, including Stephanie, fatherless. Eleanor died in 1997 and her ashes were placed in the same grave as her husband's.

== Career ==
After a year at Le Cordon Bleu Cooking School in Paris in 1975, she began working as a food writer and in 1977, became the food editor of the Toronto Star. A year later, she moved to the Ottawa Journal as Lifestyles editor. She later became the Ottawa Citizen's Lifestyles and Travel editor. Four years later, she joined a new investigative journalism unit at the Citizen and also became a national political columnist.

== Major works ==
In 1986, Cameron moved to Toronto as a national columnist and reporter for The Globe and Mail, and published her first book, in 1989, called Ottawa Inside Out. In 1990, she became a host of the CBC Television public affairs program The Fifth Estate but returned to the Globe in 1991 as a freelance columnist and feature writer. In 1995, Cameron joined Maclean's magazine as a contributing editor.

=== On the Take ===
Her second book, On the Take: Crime, Corruption and Greed in the Mulroney Years, was published in 1994. The book raised questions about the ethics of former Progressive Conservative Prime Minister Brian Mulroney. Some allegations included the following scandals: Karlheinz Schreiber making payments to him to influence Air Canada's $2 billion purchase of Airbus jetliners (Airbus Affair); maintenance contracts for Canada's CF-18; and a computerized communications system for the foreign affairs department that went $200 million over budget. The book also documented several other corruption scandals during the period.

=== Blue Trust ===
In 1998, her third book, Blue Trust, was published by Macfarlane Walter & Ross. The book profiled the bizarre life and death of Bruce Verchere, a Montreal tax lawyer and partner in the national law firm Bennett Jones LLP, who had served as private financial advisor to Mulroney, before committing suicide in late summer 1993. Just before his suicide, Verchere had been appointed as chairman of Atomic Energy of Canada Limited.

=== Elm Street Magazine ===
In 1996, Cameron was the founding editor of Elm Street, a national general-interest magazine, aimed at university-educated women. The magazine's mix of serious journalism, recipes, fashion spreads and cheeky tidbits were its main characteristics. Three years later, she resigned as Elm Street's editor, but continued on as a columnist. She also never stopped writing investigative features for Maclean's during this time. Elm Street continued to publish until 2004, publishing over 400,000 copies per issue eight times a year, distributed freely in newspapers, usually The Globe and Mail. But changes to the way the Print Measuring Bureau's (PMB) methodology on how it counted market share for advertisers, and changes to the Canadian Magazine Fund's funding model, purportedly led to its demise.

=== The Last Amigo ===
The Airbus Affair continued to be of interest to Cameron. Her next book, The Last Amigo: Karlheinz Schreiber and the Anatomy of a Scandal (2001) was co-written with CBC-TV's The Fifth Estate journalist, Harvey Cashore. This top-selling book examined the actions of Schreiber, who was facing extradition, at the time, to his native Germany to explain his role in a scandal involving kickbacks and bribes. It also goes into a detailed examination of the Airbus Affair. It won a Crime Writers of Canada award as the Best True Crime Book of the Year.

=== Books on Robert Pickton ===
Cameron began researching the Robert Pickton murder case in British Columbia in 2002, and published her first book on the case, The Pickton File, in 2007. Cameron completed her second book about the Pickton case in, On the Farm: Robert William Pickton and the Tragic Story of Vancouver's Missing Women. It was published by Knopf in the summer of 2010 when a publication ban on the case was lifted after an appeal to Supreme Court of Canada upheld the trial jury's guilty verdict. As well as documenting the botched police investigation that finally led to Pickton's arrest, the book contains important insights into why Pickton offered help to some of the woman he picked up as prostitutes, while brutally murdering others, and how he decided who he would kill. On the Farm was nominated for the 2011 Charles Taylor Prize. It won the 2011 Arthur Ellis Award for best non-fiction crime book.

=== Other works ===
Cameron was a monthly columnist and a contributor to the Toronto Star, The Ottawa Citizen, the Southam News Service, Saturday Night magazine, the Financial Post, Chatelaine, and Canadian Living.

She lectured at journalism schools across the country, and in 2008, she spent the fall term as Irving Chair in Media at St. Thomas University's journalism school in Fredericton. In 2012, she was writing a history of Kingston Penitentiary.

== Cameron, Mulroney, Schreiber and the Airbus Affair ==
Cameron became the focus of a spin campaign by Brian Mulroney's defenders, such as Luc Lavoie, to discredit the allegations against him made in her books. This included libel lawsuits against the CBC and the RCMP in the late 1990s, but not directly at Cameron. In late 2003, The Globe and Mail turned the tables on its former investigative reporter. The paper ran a series of three articles by lawyer William Kaplan. These articles claimed that Cameron had worked as a confidential informant for the Royal Canadian Mounted Police (RCMP) during its investigation of the Airbus Affair. Cameron vigorously denied the allegations, which, if true, would have compromised her credibility as a journalist.

=== Eurocopter hearings ===
In his 2004 book A Secret Trial: Brian Mulroney, Stevie Cameron and the Public Trust, Kaplan outlined evidence that illustrated the RCMP's perception of Cameron as a confidential RCMP informant. A special juridical hearing convened in spring 2004 to assess Cameron's status as a confidential informant. This arose out of the Airbus investigation leading to warrants issued in a case against the company Eurocopter and then sealing of documents that mentioned Cameron in 2001.

The new hearing was held in Toronto's Osgoode Hall courthouse before justice Edward Then. Then was the judge that allowed Cameron's name to be sealed from the public back at an evidence hearing for the Eurocopter case in 2001. Chief Superintendent Allan Matthews, the RCMP officer in charge of the Airbus investigation in 2001, recanted almost all of his previous testimony regarding Cameron's status as a confidential informant at the May 31, 2004 hearing. Matthews admitted that Cameron was not considered an RCMP confidential informant, contradicting previous assertions he made in court.

The confusion occurred due to the initial investigator, retired Staff Sergeant Fraser Fiegenwald. It was he that made contact with Cameron in 1995 and obtained documents from her. He considered her a confidential informant and through the RCMP's legal counsel, told Matthews in 2001 to consider her a confidential informant in his initial testimony. He also admitted that Cameron was telling the truth when she said any information she had shared with the RCMP was already in the public domain, and that the information she shared was of little help to their investigation.

=== Federal inquiries ===
On February 14, 2007, Cameron appeared before the House of Commons of Canada Ethics Committee in their examination of the Mulroney Airbus Settlement. She confirmed that everything she knows on the subject had been documented in her books. Cameron also made a personal statement that she was not a police informant; any information she had given to the RCMP was already in the public domain at the time.

Prime Minister Stephen Harper appointed Justice Jeffrey Oliphant, a former Associate Chief Justice of the Court of Queen's Bench of Manitoba, to lead an inquiry into former Prime Minister Mulroney and his relationship with Schreiber on June 16, 2008. The inquiry took place in Ottawa, under terms defined by David Lloyd Johnston as an advisor to Prime Minister Harper, that deliberately left out broader terms to investigate the Airbus deal. Cameron didn't participate in the inquiry and was barely following it as, in 2009, she was working on her second book about Pickton.

When Justice Oliphant's report was released on May 30, 2010, it conclusively demonstrated that Mulroney had received at least $225,000 from Schreiber, in three equal instalments, in cash, shortly after leaving office in mid-1993. Mulroney had earlier denied any business dealings whatsoever with Schreiber, and had denied receiving any money from him, as a response to questions during his lawsuit testimony given in 1996 in Montreal. Mulroney had delayed paying income tax on this money six years after he received it.

== Humanitarian work ==
Cameron served on the board of Second Harvest in Toronto as well as on the board of Portland Place, an assisted housing project for homeless and underhoused people. In 1991, she helped found an Out of the Cold program for the homeless at her church, St. Andrew's, in downtown Toronto, and worked with many churches across Canada to set up similar programs. In 2004, she received an honorary Doctor of Divinity from the Vancouver School of Theology, in part for her work with the homeless.

In recognition of more than two-decades of humanitarian work and social activism, Cameron was invested into the Order of Canada in the 2013 Canadian honours. Her citation reads: "For her achievements in investigative journalism and for her volunteer work on behalf of the disadvantaged."

== Personal life and death ==
She married David Cameron, a professor at the University of Toronto, and they had two daughters, Amy and Tassie Cameron.

Stevie Cameron died at her home in Toronto on August 31, 2024 at the age of 80. She had been afflicted by Parkinson's disease and dementia in the final years of her life.

== Bibliography ==
=== Non-fiction ===
- Ottawa Inside Out (1989); ISBN 0-00-637624-X
- On the Take: Crime, Corruption and Greed in the Mulroney Years (1994); ISBN 0-921912-73-0
- Blue Trust: The Author, the Lawyer, His Wife and Her Money (1998); ISBN 155199027X
- The Last Amigo: Karlheinz Schreiber and the Anatomy of a Scandal (2001, with Harvey Cashore); ISBN 1-55199-051-2
- The Pickton File (2007) Knopf Canada;ISBN 978-0-676-97953-4
- On the Farm: Robert William Pickton and the Tragic Story of Vancouver's Missing Women (2010); ISBN 978-0-676-97584-0

== Awards ==
- 2012 Queen Elizabeth II Diamond Jubilee Medal
- 2011 Arthur Ellis Award (Crime Writers' of Canada) for On The Farm, Best Crime Non-Fiction Book of the Year
- 2008 Irving Chair in Media, St. Thomas University, September–November 2008
- 2004 Honorary Doctorate of Divinity and convocation speaker, Vancouver School of Theology at UBC, for journalism and work with the homeless
- 2003 Honorary Diploma & Commencement speaker, Loyalist College of Applied Arts and Technology, Belleville, June 2003, for journalism and community work
- 2003 City of Toronto Community Service Award for work with the homeless
- 2002 Arthur Ellis Award (Crime Writers' of Canada) for The Last Amigo, Best Crime Non-Fiction Book of the Year (with Harvey Cashore)
- 1998 Business Book of the Year Merit Award for Blue Trust
- 1998 Windsor Press Club: Golden Quill Award for journalism
- 1995 Periodical Marketers' Awards: Book of the Year & Author of the Year, for On the Take
- 1988 Centre for Investigative Journalism Award honorable mention for a 1987 story in The Globe and Mail about the amounts the PC Canada fund paid for decorating the prime minister's residence.
