= John Manion =

Canadian civil servant

John Lawrence Manion
- Born: June 27, 1931; Almonte, Ontario, Canada
- Died: December 24, 2010 (aged 79); Ottawa, Ontario, Canada
- Education: University of Ottawa
- Occupation: civil servant
- Awards: Order of Canada

John "Jack" Lawrence Manion, OC (June 27, 1931 – December 24, 2010) was a Canadian civil servant.

Born in Almonte, Ontario, he received a Bachelor of Arts degree from the University of Ottawa in 1953. He joined the Canadian civil service working for the Immigration Service of Canada from 1953 to 1969. From 1969 to 1972, he was a Director of Manpower Training in the Department of Manpower and Immigration. In 1972, he was appointed Assistant Deputy Minister and Senior Assistant Deputy Minister in 1974. He was the Deputy Minister for the Department of Manpower and Immigration (1977), Department of Employment and Immigration (1977 to 1979), and the Treasury Board (1979 to 1986).

From 1986 to 1989, he was the Associate Secretary to the Cabinet and a Senior Personnel Advisor. From 1988 to 1991, he was Principal with the Canadian Centre for Management Development.

In 1984, he was made an Officer of the Order of Canada. In 1985, he was awarded the Outstanding Achievement Award of the Public Service of Canada. The Manion Lecture, the Canada School of Public Service's marquee speaking event, is named in his honour.
