= Frank Moores =

Canadian politician

The Honourable Frank Moores

2nd Premier of Newfoundland
- In office January 18, 1972 – March 26, 1979
- Monarch: Elizabeth II
- Lieutenant Governor: Ewart Harnum; Gordon A. Winter
- Preceded by: Joey Smallwood
- Succeeded by: Brian Peckford

Member of the Newfoundland House of Assembly for Humber West
- In office October 28, 1971 – June 18, 1979
- Preceded by: Joey Smallwood
- Succeeded by: Ray Baird

Member of Parliament for Bonavista—Trinity—Conception
- In office June 25, 1968 – September 17, 1971
- Preceded by: District established
- Succeeded by: Dave Rooney

Personal details
- Born: Frank Duff Moores; February 18, 1933 Carbonear, Dominion of Newfoundland
- Died: July 10, 2005 (aged 72) Perth, Ontario, Canada
- Party: Progressive Conservative
- Other political affiliations: Progressive Conservative Party of Newfoundland
- Spouse(s): Dorothy Pain; Janis Johnson; Beth Diamond
- Children: 8
- Education: St. Andrew's College (Aurora, Ontario), Boston University
- Occupation: Businessman, politician
- Cabinet: Minister of Fisheries (1972)

Frank Duff Moores (February 18, 1933 – July 10, 2005) served as the second premier of Newfoundland as leader of the Progressive Conservatives from 1972 until his retirement in 1979. Moores was also a successful businessman in both the fishing industry and federal lobbying. He was accused accepting secret commissions as part of the Airbus affair.

== Early life and education ==
Born in Carbonear, Dominion of Newfoundland, Moores was educated at St. Andrew's College in Aurora, Ontario. He then briefly attended Boston University in the fall of 1951, but left two months later after an argument with one of his professors. He later worked briefly in the Boston fish industry and then returned to Newfoundland, where he worked in his father's fish plant. His father, Silas Moores, was a wealthy businessman in that industry.

== Expansion of family business ==
Moores worked with his father to expand the family business, North East Fisheries, to the stage that it became the largest fish processor in Newfoundland by the early 1960s and employed 2,000 people. With his father's death of a heart attack in July 1962, he followed through on a plan to take the company to a year-round operation from the traditional summer-autumn format and then sold a majority interest to British owners.

== Politics ==
With no previous experience in politics, Moores was first elected in 1968 to the House of Commons as a Progressive Conservative. The party captured six of seven seats in the province, almost all of which had been Liberal since 1949, against the national trend that elected Pierre Elliott Trudeau with a strong majority. Moores was elected to a one-year term as president of the federal PC Party in 1969.

In 1970, he resigned his federal seat and became the leader of the Progressive Conservative Party of Newfoundland. He was asked to form a government in January 1972, several months after the October 1971 election, which resulted in a near tie between Joey Smallwood's Liberals and the Progressive Conservatives. Moores soon called a new March 1972 election and won a strong majority. In the 1975 election, he won a reduced majority.

As premier, Moores advocated rural development and provincial control of natural resources as well as economic development. He also brought a more consultative approach to government than had prevailed under Smallwood. Under his watch, the House of Assembly became the last provincial legislature to have a Question Period.

== Later life ==
He left politics in March 1979 to re-enter business and became a lobbyist. In 1983, he was an organizer of the successful federal Progressive Conservative leadership campaign for Brian Mulroney.

Moores served as an adviser to Mulroney premiership and was appointed to the Board of Air Canada, which was then a crown corporation. He also worked for Government Consultants International (GCI), a powerful Ottawa-based international lobbying firm, which then had as clients the airline firms Wardair and Nordair, which were competitors of Air Canada. Over accusations of conflict of interest, GCI later gave up Wardair and Nordair as clients. He resigned his Air Canada directorship shortly after GCI had taken on the Airbus file.

In 1987, he became the chairman of GCI and retired from this position in 1990. In the 1990s, he regained prominence for his alleged role in the Airbus affair. Karlheinz Schreiber's accountant alleged that Moores received secret commissions from Schreiber.

On July 10, 2005, Moores died of liver cancer in Perth, Ontario.

In November 2007, in the wake of new revelations about the Airbus affair by Karlheinz Schreiber, The Globe and Mail published evidence indicating that Moores had written a letter about the Airbus deal to Franz Josef Strauss, the chairman of Airbus Industrie. Moores, until his death, denied having any involvement in the affair.

== Sources ==
- Frank Moores: The Time of His Life, by Janice Wells, 2008, Key Porter Books, Toronto.
