= CDU donations scandal =

German 1990s political scandal

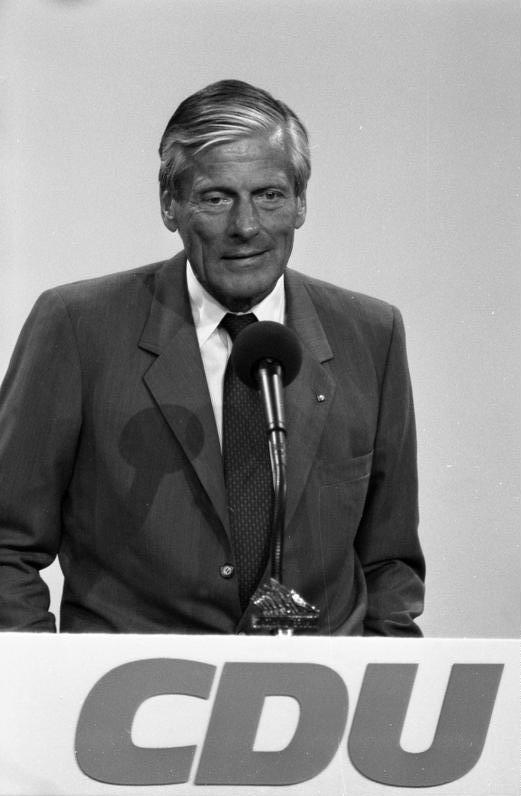
Walther Leisler Kiep, 1989

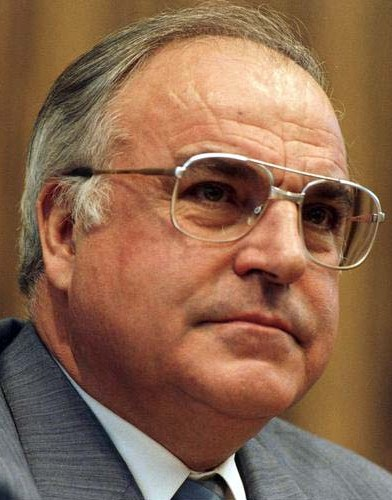
Helmut Kohl, 1987

The CDU donations scandal was a political scandal resulting from the illegal forms of party financing used by the German Christian Democratic Union (CDU) during the 1990s. These included accepting hidden donations, the non-disclosure of cash donations, the maintenance of secret bank accounts, and illegal wire transfers to and from foreign banks.

The scandal was uncovered in late 1999 and remained the dominant subject of political discussion and news coverage in Germany for several months. The Gesellschaft für deutsche Sprache selected the term Schwarzgeldaffäre (literally, "black money affair" i.e. "illegal earnings scandal") as German Word of the Year 2000. Opinion polls conducted by the Allensbach Institute suggest that in November 1999 (before the scandal became known), the CDU was expected to receive around 45 percent of the popular vote in a hypothetical German federal election. By February 2000, this value had plummeted down to 31 percent.

As a consequence, two of the leading CDU figures of the 1980s and 1990s, Helmut Kohl and Wolfgang Schäuble lost their political influence, with Angela Merkel and Roland Koch emerging as the most powerful German conservative politicians.

== Timeline ==
=== 1999 ===
Date	Event
4 November	A court in Augsburg filed an arrest warrant for Walther Leisler Kiep (who had served as CDU treasurer from 1972 to 1992) over accusations of tax evasion, following an investigation into business deals involving Karlheinz Schreiber, a German arms dealer who resides in Canada. Kiep was accused of having received DM 1 million in cash from Schreiber without proper legal disclosure. Schreiber was also wanted by German authorities over unrelated charges, but his dual Canadian citizenship prevented his extradition.
5 November	Kiep surrendered to the authorities and admitted that he had indeed accepted the money from Schreiber on 26 August 1991. The delivery of the money was at a highway service area in Switzerland and Horst Weyrauch, a financial advisor of the CDU, was there. Kiep indicated that the money had been booked as a donation for the CDU. Subsequently, he was released on a bail of DM 500,000.
6 November	Helmut Kohl, former Chancellor of Germany (1982-1998) and CDU chairman (1973-1998) stated that he had no knowledge of any CDU earnings that violated the German party financing system.
8 November	Weyrauch stated that the DM 1 million from Schreiber had been placed in an escrow account. Angela Merkel, then the CDU secretary general, demanded a "swift and comprehensive investigation" into the unfolding scandal.
12 November	Schreiber claimed that they had only served as intermediaries in the money transfer, which indeed had been intended as a hidden party financing. Hints that the money had originated as a provisional payment from the government of Saudi Arabia following the delivery of German-made tanks (a deal which was believed to have been realized by Schreiber on behalf of CDU) were rejected by Helmut Kohl.
23 November	In a TV interview, Kiep disagreed with Kohl's statement from 6 November and claimed that the CDU leadership had been informed about the money transfer.
26 November	Heiner Geißler, who had served as CDU secretary general from 1977 to 1989 (when he lost this post because of a disagreement with Kohl), confirmed the existence of covert party bank accounts.
28 November	CDU party chairman Wolfgang Schäuble, a close ally of Helmut Kohl, gave a press statement assuring the public that there would be a "thorough investigation" into the scandal. He confirmed the existence of escrow accounts managed by Weyrauch on behalf of the CDU, but rejected the term "covert bank accounts".
29 November	German news magazine Der Spiegel published an investigative story uncovering that the revenue of the regional CDU branch in Hesse had seen a dramatic increase between 1989 and 1991, culminating in an amount of several million DM, which the party had attributed to anonymous donations.
30 November	Helmut Kohl accepted the responsibility for the scandal. He claimed that, due to his prominent position in the CDU during the 1980s and 1990s, he had been involved in the initiation of confidential donations to the party and affiliated organizations, apologizing for the lack of transparency and possible violation of regulations imposed on German parties.
2 December	The Bundestag voted for the installation of a special investigation committee into the scandal.
16 December	In a TV appearance, Helmut Kohl admitted that during his time as CDU chairman, up to DM 2 million had not been properly booked. He refused to name the donors, claiming that he was bound to his word of honor to keep the donations confidential.
22 December	The Frankfurter Allgemeine Zeitung (FAZ) published an op-ed by Angela Merkel, in which she calls for her party to sever the ties with Helmut Kohl. Since 1990, Merkel had been regarded as a protégé of Kohl, who had sponsored her political career. Her FAZ article is widely regarded as an act of emancipation from Kohl, which later allowed her to become the dominant figure in the CDU, a development culminating in her being elected chancellor in 2005.
31 December	The CDU issued a modified financial report for the year 1998, which includes revenues of DM 2.3 million during the period of 1993–1996, which previously had not been accounted for.

=== 2000 ===
Date	Event
3 January	State prosecutors in Bonn initiated a criminal investigation against Helmut Kohl, suspecting him of embezzlement to the detriment of the CDU.
10 January	Wolfgang Schäuble admitted that back in 1994, he had accepted a DM 100,000 cash donation handed over from Karlheinz Schreiber. However, his account of the exact circumstances was contradicted by the CDU's then-treasurer, Brigitte Baumeister.
14 January	Manfred Kanther, who had served as chairman of the CDU regional branch in Hesse from 1991 to 1998, confirmed the existence of covert bank accounts used by the party since 1983. By 2000, these accounts contained assets worth DM 17 million. Roland Koch, who had succeeded Kanther as chairman, promised to investigate the matter "as brutal as possible."
17 January	State prosecutors in Wiesbaden initiated a criminal investigation against leading figures of the CDU in Hesse (Kanther, Weyrauch and others), concerning their roles in the scandal.
18 January	The executive committee of the CDU demanded Helmut Kohl to suspend his honorary party chairmanship (which he held since 1998) until he would reveal the names of the confidential donors.
27 January	Roland Koch revealed an act of money laundering: In 1983, DM 18 million had been transferred from covert CDU bank accounts in Hesse to an anonymous account in Switzerland and subsequently channelled back.
30 January	Horst Weyrauch confirmed the result of Koch's investigation, stating a total amount of DM 20.8 million. Weyrauch revealed that he had envisioned this money transfer plan as a means of circumventing the German party financing law.
15 February	Wolfgang Thierse, the President of the Bundestag, whom German parties are obliged to give account of their financial situation, fined the CDU a record sum of DM 41 million due to faulty reports and party financing violations, a decision which is appealed by the CDU.
16 February	Due to growing pressure concerning the uncovering of his involvement in the Schreiber donations, Wolfgang Schäuble resigned from the post as CDU chairman, as well as leader of the parliamentary group in the Bundestag.
10 April	Angela Merkel was elected new chairperson of the CDU.
4 June	Following a private fundraising call, Helmut Kohl transferred more than DM 8 million to the CDU as a compensation for damages caused by the scandal.
October	It was revealed that the money Karlheinz Schreiber had handed over to Walter Leisler Kiep in 1991 (which triggered the whole scandal) had indeed originated in a slush fund established by Thyssen AG in connection with a tank export deal with Saudi Arabia.
1 December	A second fine was imposed on the CDU by Thierse due to party donations improperly accounted for, this time amounting to DM 7.79 million.

=== Later events ===
Date	Event
31 January 2001	An administrative court in Berlin overturned the decision by Bundestag President Thierse to punish the CDU with a DM 41 million fine. In turn, Thierse appealed this verdict.
28 February 2001	The Bonn prosecutors closed their criminal investigation of Helmut Kohl following his acceptance to pay DM 150,000 to the German government and DM 150,000 to a charitable foundation.
16 September 2004	The Federal Constitutional Court of Germany, the highest court in the country, ruled that the fine imposed by Wolfgang Thierse on the CDU in 2000 had indeed been legal.
25 September 2007	Manfred Kanther and Horst Weyrauch were fined EUR 54,000 and EUR 45,000, respectively for their involvement in the scandal.
3 August 2009	Following a nearly ten year court battle, Karlheinz Schreiber was extradited from Canada to Germany. The Augsburg court, which had initiated the investigation on 4 November 1999, later sentenced him to eight years in prison due to tax evasion.
September 2011	In a review trial at the Federal Court of Justice of Germany, the verdict against Schreiber was lifted. Due to his deteriorating health, he was released from prison in March 2012 and allowed to move to Kaufering, where he has been held under house arrest ever since.

== See also ==
- Politics of Germany
- Flick affair, a similar scandal in the 1980s
- Helmut Kohl
- Angela Merkel
