= John Sawatsky =

Canadian author, journalist and interviewer

Ferdinand John Sawatsky (born 1948) is a Canadian author, journalist and interviewer.

== Early career ==
Born in Winkler, Manitoba in 1948, he graduated from Mennonite Educational Institute in Abbotsford and attended Simon Fraser University in the late 1960s. Graduating in political science, he started his career as an investigative reporter. In the 1970s, while working as the Ottawa correspondent for the Vancouver Sun, he published a series of articles on misdeeds of the Royal Canadian Mounted Police.

He quit daily journalism in 1979 and wrote a number of books, including a biography of Canadian prime minister Brian Mulroney published 1991.

He received the 1976 Michener Award for his articles about the Royal Canadian Mounted Police (RCMP) and he later wrote a number of books on the RCMP and Canadian espionage.

== Academic career ==
In 1982, Sawatsky began teaching classes in investigative journalism at various Canadian universities and was appointed adjunct professor of journalism at Carleton University's School of Journalism in 1991. Sawatsky also works as a consultant in the practice of interviewing and has been involved in interview training for the Canadian Broadcasting Corporation since 1991. He has taught interviewing techniques to television anchors, reporters and print journalists in many parts of the world, including Singapore, The United States, Sweden, Norway, and Denmark.

He currently teaches an interview-technique seminar for sports reporters for ESPN. The seminar focuses on remedying the sloppy and ineffective interviewing techniques often employed by many of today's major television and cable news interviewers. In 2004, he was hired full-time by ESPN as senior director of talent development.

== Awards and distinctions ==
Sawatsky was awarded the Michener Award in 1976 for his series of pieces on the RCMP. He also received an SFU Outstanding Alumni Awards from his alma mater in 1985, the Ottawa 1992 non-fiction book award for his biography of Brian Mulroney and the Ottawa Citizen book of the year award for Insiders.

== Publications ==
- Sawatsky, John (1980). Men In The Shadows: The RCMP Security Service. Doubleday. ISBN 0-385-14682-5.
- Sawatsky, John (1982). For Services Rendered: Leslie James Bennett and the RCMP Security Service. Doubleday. ISBN 0-385-17660-0.
- Sawatsky, John (1984). Gouzenko: The untold story. Gage Distribution Co. ISBN 0-7715-9812-2.
- Sawatsky, John (1987). Insiders: Power, Money and Secrets. McClelland & Stewart. ISBN 0-7710-7949-4.
- Sawatsky, John (1991). Mulroney: the Politics of Ambition. Macfarlane, Walter & Ross. ISBN 0-921912-06-4.
