= Grand Étang, Nova Scotia =

Community in Nova Scotia, Canada

Coordinates: 46°32′40″N 61°2′46″W

Grand Étang in Nova Scotia

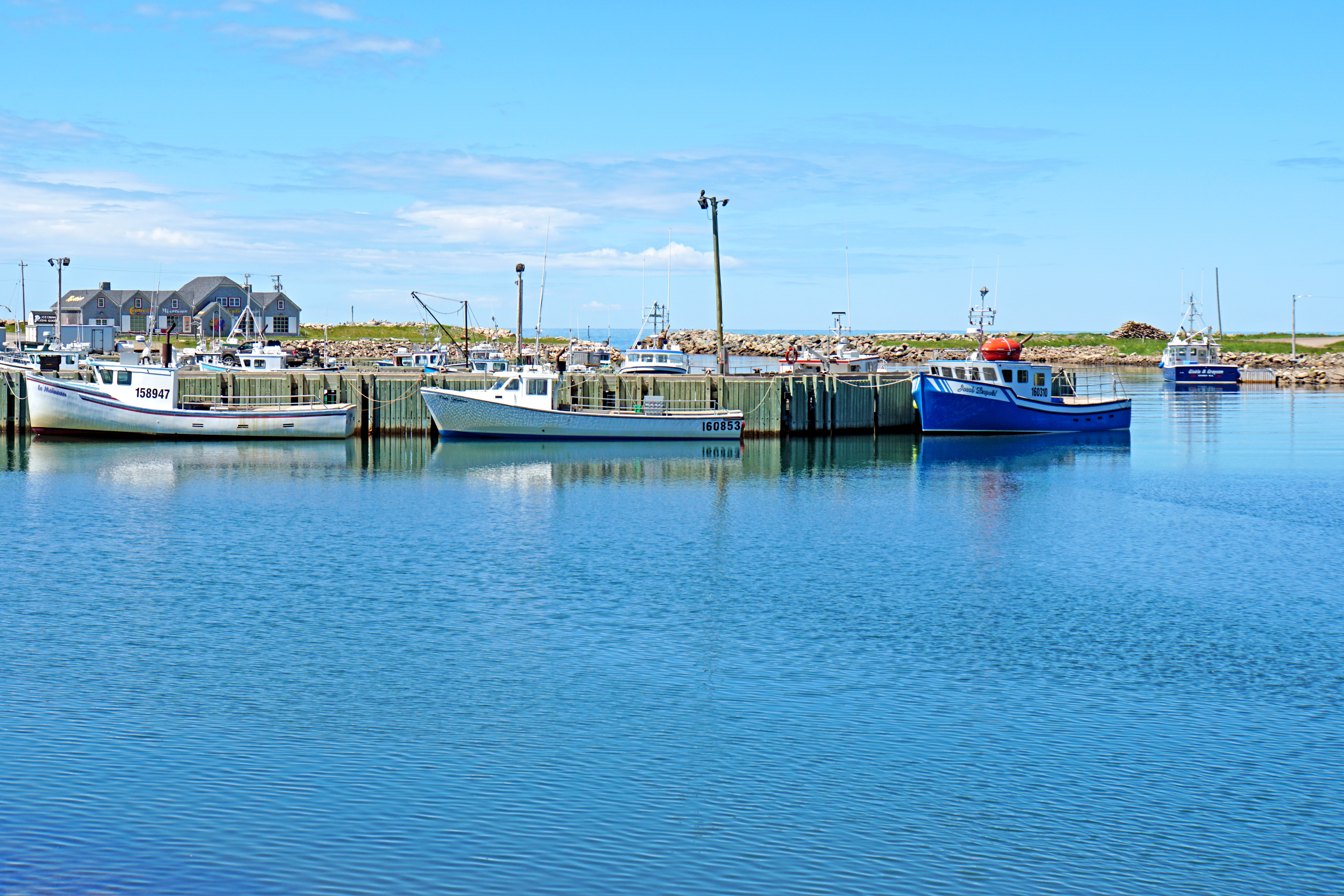
Grand-Etang harbour

Grand Étang is a small community in the Canadian province of Nova Scotia, located in Inverness County on Cape Breton Island. Grand Étang is noted for its periodic high wind events called Les Suêtes. It is also the location of Nova Scotia's first wind energy project, which was established in 2002.

== Climate ==
In August 2020, Grand Étang had four days where the temperature did not fall below 20.2 Celsius. On August 12, 2020, the overnight low was 23.3 Celsius. In 2018, the average daily temperature for August was 21.2 Celsius. Theoretically, in order to qualify for a humid subtropical climate (Cfa), Grand Étang would need an average daily temperature of 22 Celsius or higher in the warmest month (August) averaged over a 30-year period, and the average temperature in the coldest month would have to be -3 or warmer. Many areas of Nova Scotia are predicted to transition to a humid subtropical climate for the 30-year period of 2071-2100.

Climate data start in 1994 and 1995.

Climate data for Grand Étang
Month	Jan	Feb	Mar	Apr	May	Jun	Jul	Aug	Sep	Oct	Nov	Dec	Year
Record high °F (°C)	63.7 (17.6)	64.2 (17.9)	65.5 (18.6)	74.5 (23.6)	80.8 (27.1)	88.5 (31.4)	94.1 (34.5)	88.3 (31.3)	85.8 (29.9)	80.4 (26.9)	84.9 (29.4)	66.2 (19.0)	94.1 (34.5)
Mean daily maximum °F (°C)	32.2 (0.1)	30.4 (−0.9)	36.1 (2.3)	44.6 (7.0)	55.4 (13.0)	67.6 (19.8)	74.1 (23.4)	73.6 (23.1)	66.6 (19.2)	56.1 (13.4)	47.3 (8.5)	37.9 (3.3)	51.8 (11.0)
Mean daily minimum °F (°C)	20.8 (−6.2)	17.2 (−8.2)	22.6 (−5.2)	31.1 (−0.5)	40.3 (4.6)	50.0 (10.0)	60.3 (15.7)	60.4 (15.8)	54.0 (12.2)	45.3 (7.4)	37.0 (2.8)	28.2 (−2.1)	38.9 (3.9)
Source: weatherstats.ca
