= William Kaplan =

Canadian lawyer and writer (born 1957)

- Born: 24 May 1957 (age 69); Toronto, Ontario
- Education: University of Toronto; York University; Stanford University
- Occupations: Lawyer, writer, law professor

William Kaplan (born 24 May 1957) is a Canadian lawyer, arbitrator, emeritus professor of law and author. He is a recipient of the Law Society Medal from the Law Society of Upper Canada (1999) for his contributions to the legal profession and the David W. Mundell medal for legal service to Ontario (2009).

== Biography ==
Kaplan was a professor at the University of Ottawa Law School from 1989 to 2001also worked during that time in private practice as a mediator and investigator. Kaplan served as an arbitrator or mediator for numerous labour action and negotiations in Canada since 1989, including high profile disputes such as the 2025 Air Canada flight attendants strike, Nova Scotia healthcare worker compensation in 2018, 2018 York University strike, and CP Rail worker strike in 2012.

His awards from the Law Society of Upper Canada have included the Law Society Medal in 1999, and an Honorary L.L.D. in 2002. In 2010 the government of Ontario awarded him the 2009 David W. Mundell medal.

== Writings ==
- Everything that Floats: Pat Sullivan, Hal Banks and the Seamen's Unions of Canada, by William Kaplan, Toronto 1987, University of Toronto Press, ISBN 0-8020-2597-8.
- State and Salvation: The Jehovah's Witnesses & Their Fight for Civil Rights, by William Kaplan, Toronto 1989, University of Toronto Press.
- Belonging: The Meaning and Future of Canadian Citizenship, edited by William Kaplan, Montreal 1992, McGill-Queen's University Press, ISBN 0-7735-0985-2.
- Law, Policy, and International Justice, edited by William Kaplan and Donald McRae, Montreal 1993, McGill-Queen's University Press, ISBN 0-7735-1114-8.
- Bad Judgment: The Case of Mr. Justice Leo A. Landreville, by William Kaplan, Toronto 1996, University of Toronto Press
- Presumed Guilty: Brian Mulroney, the Airbus Affair, and the Government of Canada, by William Kaplan, 1998, ISBN 0-7710-4593-X.
- One More Border: The True Story of One Family's Escape from War-Torn Europe, by William Kaplan, Toronto 1998, Groundwood Books.
- A Secret Trial: Brian Mulroney, Stevie Cameron, and the Public Trust, by William Kaplan, Montreal 2004, McGill-Queen's University Press, ISBN 0-7735-2846-6.
- Canadian Maverick: The Life and Times of Ivan C Rand, by William Kaplan, Toronto 2009, University of Toronto Press
- Why Dissent Matters: Because Some People See Things The Rest of Us Miss, by William Kaplan, Toronto 2017, McGill-Queen's University Press, ISBN 978-0773550704.
