= Irish Quebecers =

Quebecers of Irish descent
- Flag of Irish Heritage Quebec

Total population
- 446,215 (2016)

Regions with significant populations
- (Throughout Quebec with significant populations in Montreal and the Eastern Townships)
- Montreal: 92,145

Languages
- Quebec English, Quebec French, Irish (historic)

Religion
- Roman Catholicism, Protestantism, Irreligious

Related ethnic groups
- Irish, Irish Canadians, English-speaking Quebecer

Irish Quebecers (French: Irlando-Québécois, Irish: Éireannaigh as Québec) are residents of the Canadian province of Quebec who have Irish ancestry. In 2016, there were 446,215 Quebecers who identified themselves as having partial or exclusive Irish descent in Quebec, representing 5.46% of the population.

== Demographics ==
As of the 2016 census, there were 446,215 Quebecers who identified themselves as Irish representing 5.46% of the population.

In the city of Montreal, there are 92,145 people of declared Irish heritage.

Irish culture and community organizations are mostly kept alive by the English-speaking population such as the United Irish Societies of Montreal. Most of the descendents of the Irish population settled in Quebec assimilated into the French-speaking majority population. In the whole province, it's estimated that a third of the population descend from Irish individuals.

Irish traditional dances and music, such as jigs and fiddling are partly an inspiration for traditional dances and music in Quebec.

== Saint Patrick's Day Parade ==
The longest-running Saint Patrick's Day parade in Canada is held each year in Montreal, Quebec. The parades have been held since 1824 and have been organized by the United Irish Societies of Montreal since 1929. However, St. Patrick's Day itself has been celebrated in Montreal as far back as 1759 by Irish soldiers in the Montreal Garrison during the British conquest of New France.

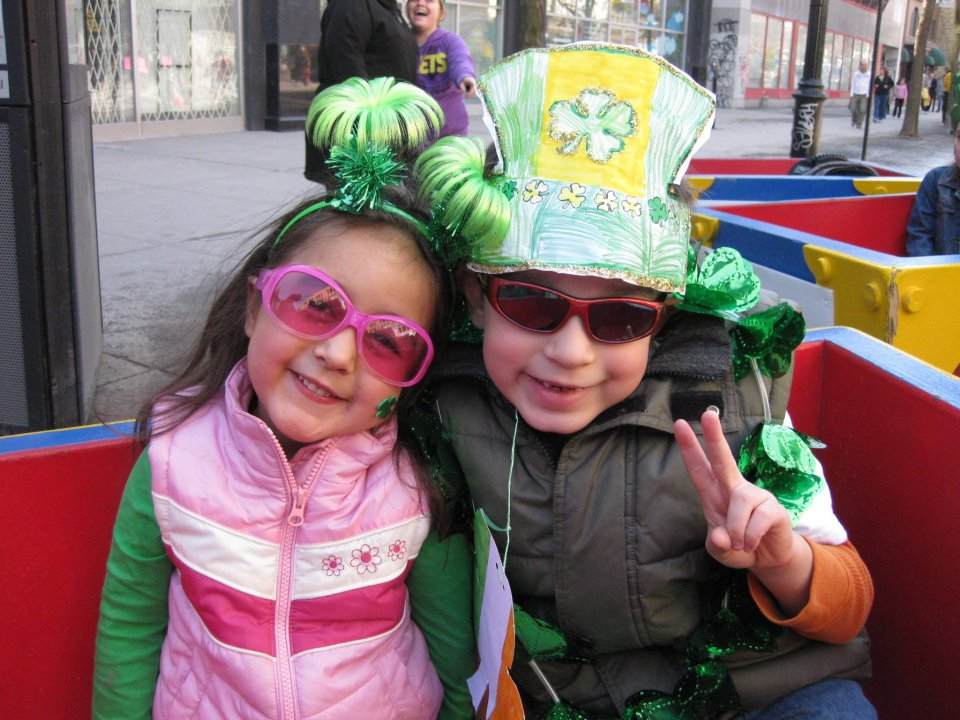
Young Participants in Montreal's Saint Patrick's Parade

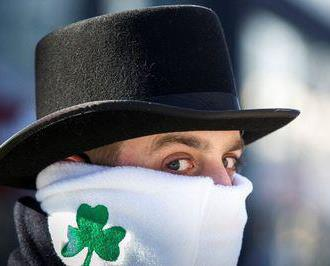
Montreal Saint Patrick parade marshal trying to stay warm

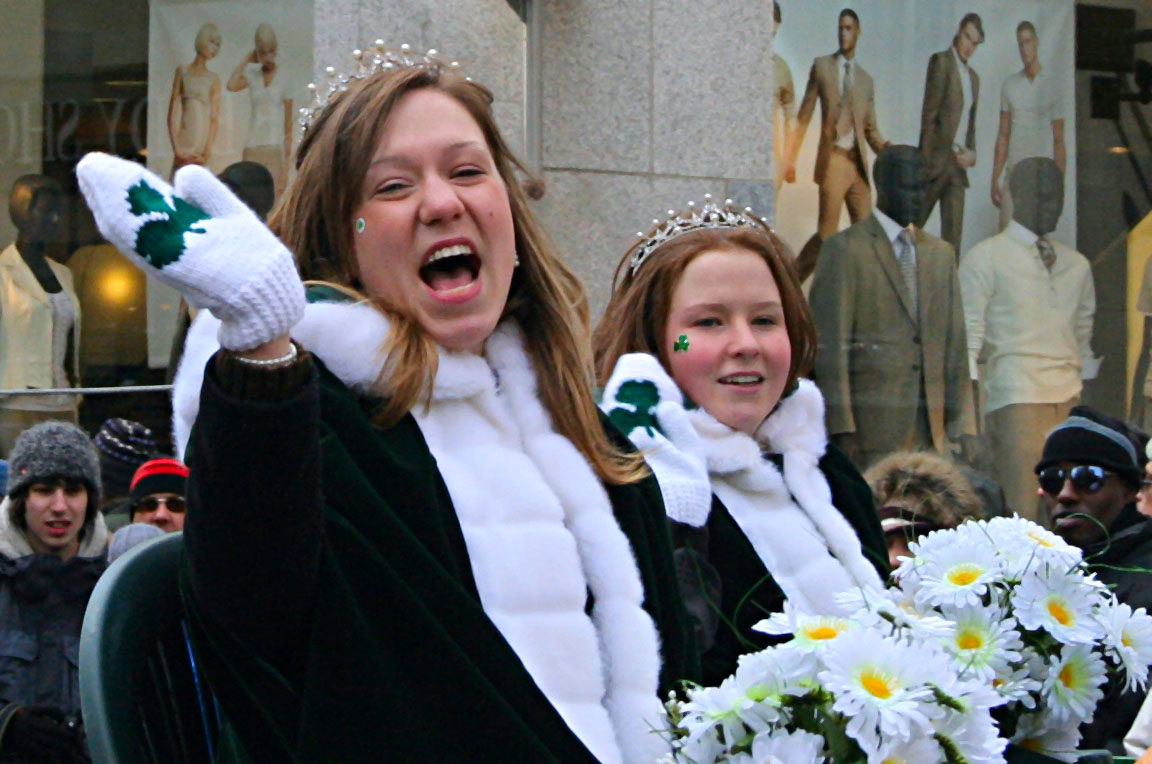
Saint Patrick's Day Parade in Montreal.

== History ==
=== New France (1608–1763) ===
In the seventeenth century, Irish residing in France were among those sent to colonize the Saint Lawrence Valley in New France. After the Reformation, Irish Catholic nobility, soldiers, and clergy would serve Catholic Monarchs in France, Spain, and the Low Countries. Nearly 35,000 Irish served in the French military in the seventeenth century. By 1700 there were approximately one hundred Irish-born families among the 2,500 families registered in New France, along with an additional thirty families of mixed Irish and French backgrounds. Only 10 colonists had arrived from Ireland directly. In the early eighteenth century, many Irish Catholics arrived from New England seeking to practice their religion more freely. During the Seven Years' War, French authorities also encouraged desertion among the Irish serving in the British army in North America. In 1757, Governor Pierre Rigaud de Vaudreuil raised an Irish company consisting of deserters and prisoners of war who had served with the enemy British army; this company returned to France after the war. Most of these Irish soldiers, settlers, and deserters assimilated into French-Canadian society.

=== Lower Canada (early 1800s) ===
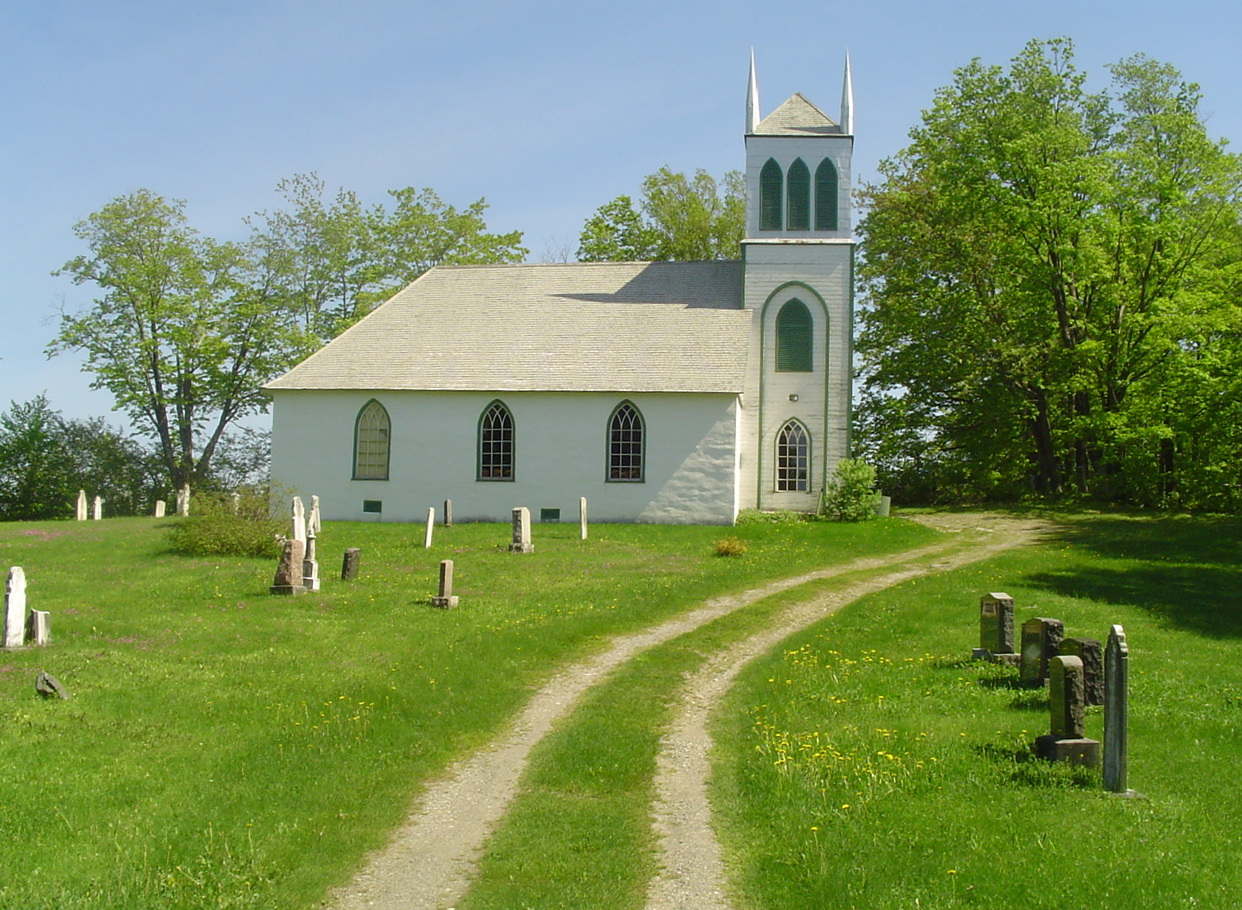
Christ Church of Springbrook Anglican Church in Frampton, Quebec

Overpopulation and the enclosure movement in Ireland along with established commercial shipping routes between Quebec City and ports in Dublin and Liverpool encouraged large waves of Irish emigration to Lower Canada starting in 1815. Most of these emigrants would come to cities in Lower Canada, establishing Irish communities in Montreal (1817) and Quebec City (1819). In Quebec, most Irish Catholics settled close to the harbour in the Lower Town working in the shipyards and on the wharves. By 1830, they constituted 7,000 of 32,000 inhabitants. The Montreal population was more transient, attracted to labor in large construction projects such as the Lachine Canal before moving on to Upper Canada and the United States. In 1825 Irish Catholics and Protestants constituted about 3,000 people out of a total city population of 25,000 and were about equal in number. Irish Catholics in formed distinctive neighbourhoods in the western portion of the city and later in Griffintown near the Lachine Canal works. Irish Catholic settlers also opened up new agricultural areas in the recently surveyed Eastern Townships, the Ottawa Valley, and Gatineau and Pontiac counties. Irish from Quebec would also settle in communities such as Frampton, Saint Sylvestre, and Saint Patrick in the Beauce region of southeastern Quebec.

Irish became heavily involved in political life and newspaper publishing in Montreal. Many Irish leaders were involved in the Parti Canadien, Saint-Jean-Baptiste Society, and other French Canadian republican patriotic groups involved in the Lower Canada Rebellion of 1837–1838. The Saint Patrick's Society of Montréal was founded in 1834 as an Irish patriotic organization with a political motive to counter the republican sentiments, with both Catholic and Protestant members sharing values of loyalty to the British Crown. The society vigorously defended the colonial government during the rebellion.

=== The Great Irish Famine and Confederation (1840s to 1870s) ===
External videos
- "Orphans" – Historica Canada. – Heritage Minutes (1:01 min)

Canada East saw a substantial increase in immigration from Ireland during the Great Irish Famine (1845–1849). In 1847 alone, close to 100 000 arrived in Grosse Isle, an island in present-day Quebec which housed the immigration reception station. Thousands died or were treated in the hospital (equipped for fewer than one hundred patients); in fact, many boats that reached Grosse-Île had lost the bulk of their passengers and crew, and many more died in quarantine on or near the island. From Grosse-Île, most survivors were sent to Montreal. In 1909, a Celtic cross was erected on the island to commemorate the tragedy. Orphaned children were adopted into Quebec families and accordingly became Québécois, both linguistically and culturally. Some of these children fought for their right to keep their Irish surnames, and were largely successful.

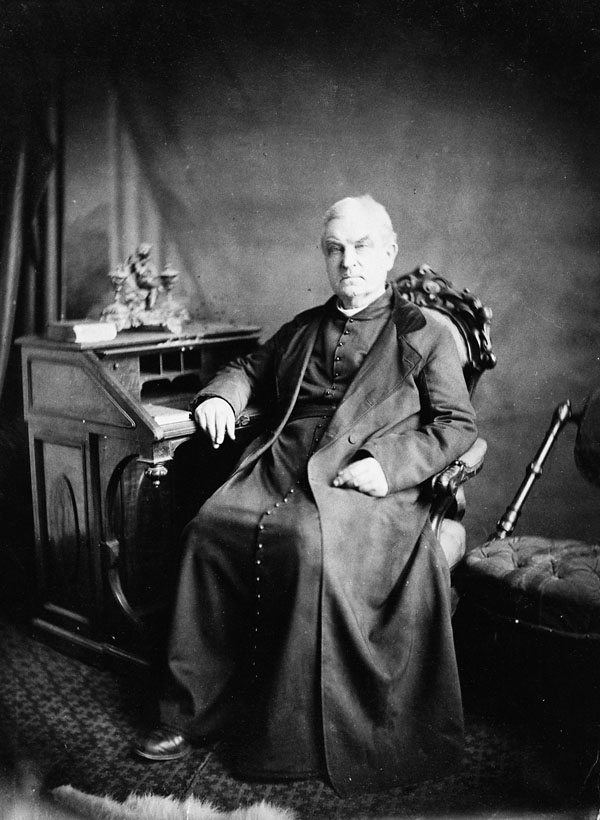
Father Patrick Dowd, pastor of Saint Patrick's Church, Montreal

In the 1840s and 1850s, Irish immigrants laboured on the Victoria Bridge, living in a tent city at the foot of the bridge (see Goose Village, Montreal). Here, workers unearthed a mass grave of 6000 Irish immigrants who had died in an earlier typhus epidemic. The Irish Stone remains at the bridge entrance to commemorate the tragedy. The Irish would go on to settle permanently in the close-knit working-class neighbourhoods of Pointe-Saint-Charles and Griffintown, working in the nearby flour mills, factories, and sugar refineries.

The famine hardened the attitude of Irish Catholics towards the British and Irish Protestants. Irish Catholics would fight fiercely to preserve a distinct identity from both Quebec Protestants and French Canadian Catholic populations. With the help of Quebec's Irish Catholic Church led by priests such as Father Patrick Dowd, they would establish their own churches, schools, and hospitals. St. Patrick's Basilica was founded in 1847 and served Montreal's English-speaking Catholics for over a century. The Saint Patrick's Society would be revived as a Catholic organization in 1856. Distinct English Catholic schools, affiliated with French Catholic school boards, developed in the 1840s and 1850s.

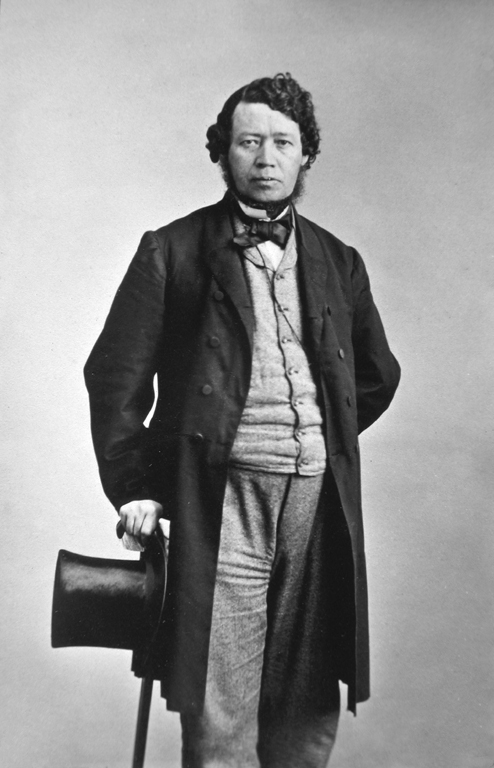
Photo of Thomas D'Arcy McGee, Father of Confederation

The famine also radicalized a portion of the Irish population. The Fenian movement in Ireland and the United States sought to overthrow British rule in Ireland. The Fenian Brotherhood in the United States organized raids across the border into Canada in an attempt to seize control of the British colony. Irish Protestants used the Orange Order to assert British rule in Ireland and Canada, and espoused anti-Catholic views. D'Arcy McGee, an Irish Montrealer serving as a Cabinet Minister in the Great Coalition Government, strongly opposed both the Orange Order and Fenians. He worked as a Cabinet Minister within the Great Coalition government to ensure that the rights of Catholics were protected in the new Confederation of provinces in British North America in 1867. As a result, Catholic school boards became enshrined in the Canadian Constitution in 1867. They were abolished and merged with Protestant schools into English school boards after a Constitutional amendment in 2001. McGee was assassinated by Fenians as a traitor in 1868.

=== Post-Confederation and modern-day Quebec ===
English language Irish Catholic institutions continued to expand in the late 19th and early 20th century. Loyola College (Montreal) was founded by the Jesuits to serve Montreal's mostly Irish English-speaking Catholic community in 1896. Saint Mary's Hospital was founded in the 1920s and continues to serve Montreal's present-day English-speaking population.

One of the greatest influences the Irish had and still have on their new compatriots is within music. The music of Quebec has adopted, and adapted, the Irish reel as its own.

The Saint Patrick's Day parade of Montreal, Quebec is still the oldest organized large parade of its kind in Canada. On March 17, 2008, on the 175th anniversary of Montreal's St. Patrick Society, Quebec Premier Jean Charest announced the creation of the Johnson chair of Irish studies at Concordia University.

== Famous Irish Quebecers ==
- La Bolduc
- Pat Burns
- Patrice Bergeron-Cleary
- Robin Burns
- Henry Caldwell
- Jean Charest
- Jim Corcoran
- Peter Cullen
- Georges Dor
- Sir Edmund Flynn
- Frank Hanley
- Emmett Johns
- Daniel Johnson, Sr.
- Daniel Johnson, Jr.
- Pierre-Marc Johnson
- Patrick Kennedy
- Tom Kenny (American-born)
- Dr. Larkin Kerwin
- Joe Malone
- Paul Martin (Ontario-born)
- Kate McGarrigle
- Anna McGarrigle
- Thomas Mulcair
- Brian Mulroney
- Emile Nelligan (1879–1941) Symbolist Poete Maudit and iconic figure in Canadian literature
- Edmund Bailey O'Callaghan
- Marianna O'Gallagher
- Allan "The Weasel" Ross (1944–2018) boss of Montreal's West End Gang and fifth largest drug lord in the world
- Claude Ryan
- Frank "Dunie" Ryan (1942–1984) Irish mob boss of Montreal's West End Gang and drug lord
- Robert Guy Scully
- Kevin O’Leary
- Kevin Tierney
- Georges Vanier

== See also ==
- List of Irish Quebecers
- French-speaking Quebecer
- English-speaking Quebecer
- Scots-Quebecer
- Griffintown
- Irish influence on Quebec culture
- Irish roots of Quebec reel music
- Irish diaspora
  - Irish Canadians
- List of Ireland-related topics
- Culture of Ireland
