= Gerald Matticks =

Canadian gangster (1940–2025)

- Born: 4 July 1940; Montreal, Quebec, Canada
- Died: 21 November 2025 (aged 85)
- Other name: "Big Gerry"
- Occupation: Crime boss
- Years active: 1955–?
- Known for: Leader of the West End Gang
- Predecessor: Allan Ross
- Successor: Shane Kenneth Maloney
- Allegiance: West End Gang
- Conviction: Conspiracy to traffic in narcotics (2001)
- Penalty: 12 years' imprisonment

Gerald Matticks (4 July 1940 – 21 November 2025) was a Canadian gangster and the long-time leader of the West End Gang of Montreal.

== Criminal career ==
=== From rags to riches ===
Matticks was born in the Goose Village section of the Pointe-Saint-Charles district of Montreal, the youngest of 14 children in a very poor family of Irish immigrants. His father worked as a driver of a wagon for the city of Montreal while his mother was a housewife. Matticks was married at the age of 17 and had fathered four children by the time he was 21. By the 1960s, Matticks, together with his brothers John, Fred, Robert and Richard, were leaders of a gang whose forte was hijacking trucks. Billy Morgan, a thief with the West End Gang, a friend of Frederick Matticks, recalled: "I could walk though The Point and [Goose] Village with no problem, because in those days the Matticks clan had to know you." Matticks was first convicted in 1966, and had numerous convictions for theft, breaking and entering, possession of stolen goods, and drunk driving. The Matticks brothers eventually joined the West End Gang led by Frank Ryan. Initially, the Matticks brothers started to sell their stolen goods to Ryan, but ultimately joined his gang. The Matticks brothers were, alongside Patrick "Hughie" McGurnaghan, Paul April, Allan "The Weasel" Ross, Peter White, and Kenny McPolland, the principal lieutenants of Ryan.

In 1971, Matticks was charged with the attempted murder of a Montreal dockworker who had complained to the police that he and his brothers were stealing from the Port of Montreal. It was alleged by the Crown that on 14 October 1971 Gerald, along with his brother John Matticks, had kidnapped Allan Seller by dragging him into their car and shot him twice. At his trial, Matticks was acquitted on 17 January 1972 when three witnesses gave him an alibi, saying they were drinking with him at a local pub. One of the men who gave Matticks an alibi, an officer of the Royal Canadian Mounted Police (RCMP), later joined the West End Gang.

In 1973, Matticks was arrested along with his brother Richard on 15 charges of hijacking, theft and possession of stolen goods with the Crown alleging that, between 25 September and 27 October 1973, the Matticks brothers had in their possession several truckloads of frozen meat, alcohol, audio systems, cigarettes, leather goods, clothing, televisions, cosmetics and lingerie, which they were selling to people whom they met in bars who were all willing to buy on the cheap items that supposedly "fell off the back of a truck." Both Matticks brothers were convicted, but as usual were given only light sentences. In 1977, Matticks was found by the police to have some stolen jewelry worth $5,000 in his house, but was acquitted when the Crown was unable to establish that he had stolen the jewelry. In 1979, the Commission d'Enquête sur le Crime Organisé (CECO) accused Gerry, Richard and Frederick Matticks of being the most aggressive and prolific truck hijackers in Montreal between 1972 and 1979. The three brothers were subpoenaed to appear before the royal commission, where they denied all of the allegations. On 12 November 1979, Matticks together with his two brothers, Ryan, Fred Griffith and André "Sappy" Martin were indicated on charges of perjury for their testimony at the CECO together with 158 courts of theft and possession of stolen goods. In December 1981, the accused were acquitted on all charges. In 1981, Matticks was again acquitted of charges of hijacking a truck in 1973. In 1984, Matticks became president of the Cooper and Checkers' Union at the port of Montreal.

On 15 November 1988, Matticks, along with his brother Richard and Normand Beauregard, were arrested while unloading a hijacked truck full of imported clothing worth $150,000. The case was hindered by the murder of the lawyer for the accused, Sidney Leithman, on 13 May 1991 and ended on 8 June 1992 with the accused all making plea bargains with the Crown. In exchange for guilty pleas, the accused were sentenced to 90 days in prison over the course of 45 weekends in Bordeaux prison and paid $10,000 fines.

Increasingly prosperous, Matticks began investing in legitimate businesses and became the owner of a trucking firm, a cattle farm and a beef wholesaling company. Matticks relocated with his family to a rural nine-building estate outside of the city near La Prairie. In southwestern Montreal, Matticks became celebrated for dressing up as Santa Claus every Christmas to hand out free food to the poor. Matticks in particular was known for handing out frozen chickens and turkeys for Christmas and Thanksgiving, of which he seemed to possess an endless supply. At the annual St. Patrick's Day parade, Matticks would ride in a float and throw out dollars to the crowds, adding to his popularity with the people of Montreal.

Matticks was a devout Catholic. His parish priest, Father Marc Mignault, has praised him for his generosity, saying that Matticks paid to have the leaking roof of his church repaired for free. Father Mignault argues that Matticks was a fundamentally decent and good man. A different picture of Matticks was presented by Commander André Bouchard, the head of Montreal police's Major Crimes Unit. Bouchard stated that, starting in the 1980s, "people were literally sniffing it [cocaine] right there on the bar and on the tables, even on boards' bellies. I mean they weren't even hiding it in the toilets... So we said, 'Wait a minute, how the fuck is all this shit coming in?' And that's when the name Matticks kept popping up. We'd bust a [drug] dealer downtown and he'd give up a name. It was always Gerry Matticks and the West End Gang." In 1992, when Allen Ross was convicted of drug charges in the United States, Matticks replaced him as leader of the West End Gang.

Due to their control over the Port of Montreal, the West End Gang to a large extent also controls the supply of illegal drugs imported into Canada, making them critical players in the Montreal underworld. Matticks came to be known as the "door to the port of Montreal." Canadian criminologist Steven Schneider wrote: "By the 1990s, Gerald Matticks was a millionaire with investments in various legitimate businesses including a transport company, a meat wholesaling business and a restaurant...All the while he was a cunning and circumspect drug smuggler, importing thousands of kilos of hashish and cocaine, which he wholesaled through his own network, supplying the elite of Quebec's underworld – the Hells Angels, the Rock Machine, the Rizzuto family, as well as Asian and Russian criminal groups." Sidney Peckford, the last director of the Canada Ports Police before the force was abolished in 1997, stated in an interview: "We knew about him [Matticks] and we knew about the people he controlled. I had intelligence reports coming out of my ass."

=== L'Affaire Matticks ===
In April 1994, a Norwegian container ship, the Thor 1, docked in Montreal. Acting on an anonymous phone tip, the Sûreté du Québec searched the Thor 1 and discovered some 26.5 tons of hashish hidden within the ship in the precise location where the anonymous caller said it would be found. The Thor 1 had set sail from the South African port city of Durban, carrying several containers of hashish from Mozambique and Uganda. On the basis of the drugs seized from the Thor 1, Matticks was charged with conspiracy to import drugs on 13 May 1994. The trial began on 26 September 1994. The case against Matticks collapsed in the courtroom in 1995 when Mattick's lawyers established that the Sûreté du Québec had planted evidence, most notably documents written in French that were found in Mattick's house. Matticks had never attended school, spoke English as his first language, was illiterate, and was quite incapable of writing anything in either French or English. On 15 June 1995, the presiding judge, Justice Micheline Corbeil-Laramée, dropped the charges, saying the Sûreté du Québec detectives had engaged in "reprehensible conduct" by planting documents in Matticks's house.

On 9 June 1996, the four detectives in charge of the Thor 1 case were acquitted on charges of perjury and evidence-tampering, which led to an outcry in the media, with many alleging that the Sûreté du Québec's Internal Affairs detectives had intentionally botched their investigation to ensure the acquittal of the accused. Reports in the media alleged that the Sûreté du Québec commissioner Serge Barbeau and other senior SQ officers had threatened the internal affairs detectives in charge of the investigation into L'Affaire Matticks. Barbeau was forced to resign in disgrace later in 1996 when the allegations started to become too credible.

On 23 October 1996, the Quebec government appointed a royal commission to examine the case. The fall-out from the Thor 1 affair was a royal commission headed by Justice Lawrence Poitras which criticized the Sûreté du Québec for routinely engaging in unprofessional actions such as planting evidence, threatening witnesses, and perjury. The commission's report presented on 30 December 1998 stated the Sûreté du Québec "routinely broke laws during its criminal investigations". According to the Royal Canadian Mounted Police (RCMP) informer Dany Kane, the anonymous caller was Hells Angels Montreal chapter president Maurice Boucher, who had also bribed the Sûreté du Québec detectives to plant the evidence, as this would be a "win-win" for him. If Matticks was convicted, he would eliminate a potential rival or if Mattick's lawyers exposed the planted evidence, the resulting backlash would bring disgrace and discredit upon the Sûreté du Québec. The scandal, known as L'Affaire Matticks, did much damage to the reputation of the Sûreté du Québec.

=== Corruption on the waterfront ===
Matticks controlled the hiring of "checkers" at the Port of Montreal, whose task is to oversee the loading and unloading of containers from the ships that dock at Montreal. Matticks's eldest son, Donald, worked as a "checker" at the port for 15 years from 1987 to 2002. Donald Matticks later testified that during his time as a "checker" that his real job was to ensure that the containers holding drugs were never inspected. Kevin McGarr, an Irish-Canadian detective with the Service de police de la Ville de Montréal stated in an interview: "I know a lot of people who work on the waterfront. Most of them got their jobs from Matticks. He had a stranglehold on the checkers". McGarr further stated: "There's bit of Robin Hood in him [Matticks]. It was a legend down in the Point. If a truck of hams went missing, you'd be sure everyone in the Point was having hams that week...If one of these checkers had a fire in their house the week before Christmas, don't worry-they're still going to have Christmas dinner and the kids are all going to have gifts. Matticks would have taken care of them. Which is why these people are not going to rat on him. It's not going to happen". The Port of Montreal is the world largest inland port where 90% of all goods destined for Quebec and Ontario are unloaded off container ships. In addition, many goods are offloaded in Montreal for "lakers" (ships that sail the Great Lakes) that sail down the St. Lawrence Seaway to the American Great Lakes port cities such as Chicago, Detroit, Cleveland, Toledo, Buffalo, Milwaukee, and Duluth. Likewise, goods at off-loaded at the port of Montreal from the "lakers" to the "salties" (ships that sail the oceans). Matticks once served as the president of the Coopers and Checkers Union for the port, which allowed him to place his followers into key positions at the port. In November 2001, Pierre Primeau, a RCMP officer, testified to a committee of the House of Commons in Ottawa: "To become a [Coopers and Checkers] union member you need to be sponsored by someone who will vouch for you. Most of the employees...are either family members or very close friends of Gerald Matticks".

Matticks had West End Gang members working in all four of the port's terminals, but the Termont terminal on Notre-Dame Boulevard was described as his "power base". To smuggle drugs into the port, Matticks only needed the control of the checkers who knew the serial numbers of the containers being off-loaded and workers who knew the shipping plans. McGarr stated in an interview that even if someone who wanted to import drugs did not know the serial number of the containers, all that was necessary was a photograph of the container with the drugs as he stated: "And you say, 'When this one off the boat-there's no paperwork for it-just have it put somewhere' No problem".

In January 1998, Dominic Taddeo, the CEO of the Montreal Port Authority who has often claimed there was no corruption in the Port of Montreal, stated in a press conference that the claims that Matticks controlled the port were "hearsay" as he claimed: "There's no question of that in Montreal. Our terminals are secure". About these claims, Commander Bouchard has stated that the man who really runs the Port of Montreal is Matticks, saying: "Nothing comes out of the harbor until Matticks says it comes out of the harbor. How the hell can Taddeo honestly say on camera that it's the best-run business? What are you, blind?"

The Liberal Senator Colin Kenny led a Senate committee to Montreal and stated the port of Montreal resembled the port of New York as depicted in the 1954 film On the Waterfront as he recalled: "We were looking at each other, wondering when Karl Malden was going to appear. It shocked the hell out of us". Kenny was critical of the decision of his own government in 1997 to abolish the ports police as a cost-saving measure, saying the unarmed security guards with no power of arrest and investigation hired by the port authority were hapless in the face of the West End Gang. Kenny wrote that the security guards were useless and that the West End Gang openly controls the port of Montreal. Kenny's report revealed that in the port of Montreal 15% of stevedores, 36.3% of the checkers and 54% of the garbagemen had criminal records. The garbagemen were considered important by the West End Gang because their job required them regularly enter and leave the port on a daily basis while it was easy to smuggle drugs out in the garbage bags. Kenny's report stated: "We have been absolutely shocked by what we have heard. What became apparent to us was that there was a whole underground system of governance in some ports that the police were aware of but did not have the resources to address". The report recommended that the federal government impose mandatory background checks on port employees; a national standard for security perimeters; and public inquiries into the ports to root out waterfront corruption. The recommendations were ignored, and all the federal government provided was more money to hire more unarmed security guards for the ports.

Matticks himself admitted in an interview with a journalist held in Mickey's, the Irish-themed Montreal pub that he owned, that: "I inherited who I am from my family. We're not saints. You 'll notice there are no drugs here. I don't like drugs". The journalists William Marsden and Julian Sher wrote that Matticks may not had liked drugs in Mickey's as he claimed in the interview, but that he was at the center of a global smuggling network, bringing in drugs from Asia, Europe and the rest of the world to Montreal. Many of the drugs came from the "Golden Crescent" nations of Afghanistan, Pakistan and Iran, where the profits were immense. Hashish that cost $200 per kilogram in Afghanistan sold for $5,000 per kilogram in Montreal. Sher and Marsden wrote that of the 200-250 tons of hashish produced in the world annually, about 75 tons of the hashish is smuggled every year into North America via the port of Montreal, making Matticks into one of the most important players in the drug trade in Canada. Matticks was friendly with Boucher and served as the guarantor on the mortgage on Boucher's estate in Contrecoeur. However, the Rock Machine appealed to Matticks several times to broker a peace agreement to end the Quebec biker war as Matticks was despite his friendship with Boucher regarded as neutral.

=== Operation Springtime ===
As part of an investigation into the Hells Angels, the police observed Boucher meeting Matticks on 25 May 1999 at his office at Viandes 3–1, an office complex owned by Matticks. On 2 December 1999, Boucher was again observed meeting Matticks at Viandes 3–1. On 10 October 2000, Mattick's business partner, Louis Elias Lekkes, was observed by the police picking up two boxes full of money from the Hells Angels and taking it to Viandes 3–1, and from there to Mattick's estate. On 16 November 2000, Lekkes was observed taking a bag with some $500,000 in cash from the Hells Angels to Matticks's estate. On 7 December 2000, Matticks and Lekkes were observed meeting with Normand Robitaille of the Hells Angels' Nomad chapter at an Italian restaurant. Robitaille handed over to Matticks a briefcase. The Hells Angels in their records referred to Matticks as "Beef 1" and Lekkes as "Beef 2". According to the police, in the year 2000 Matticks oversaw the importation of eight shipments of drugs into Montreal totaling some 44 093 tons of hashish and 265 kilos of cocaine with a total street value of some $2 billion. Matticks and Lekkes preferred to use walkie-talkies instead of cellular phones, and Matticks was constantly on his guard for phone bugs. In the fall of 2000, the truckers union went on strike, but in a sign of Matticks' power, trucks continued to enter and leave the port of Montreal despite the strike. One truck that left the port, supposedly full of Belgian chocolates, was stopped by the police and found to contain a ton of hashish.

On 28 March 2001, Matticks was arrested as part of Operation Springtime, a crackdown aimed at the Hells Angels, but which also embraced him. As part of Operation Springtime, the police seized the records of the Hells Angels, which showed that Matticks was one of their main suppliers of drugs. At the time of Operation Springtime, the Hells Angels owned Matticks some $7 million accordingly to the records seized by the police. In Mattick's office at Viandes 3–1, the police found a refrigerator with a note-tag reading "Mom" (Boucher's nickname) and "Guy" together with two phone numbers. One number was for the cell phone number for Guy LePage, a former policeman turned chauffeur for Boucher while another was for a pager registered in LePage's name. In Mattick's house, the police found some US$6,200 in cash and CA$41,000 in cash.

After the arrests, Lekkes tried to commit suicide on 16 July 2001 by trying to hang himself in his jail cell. On the next day as Lekkes recovered he decided to turn Crown's evidence in exchange for a lesser sentence. According to Lekkes, the West End Gang controlled the port of Montreal, which Matticks used for drug smuggling, selling drugs to the Rizzuto family, the Hells Angels and the Rock Machine. Lekkes testified that he started working for Matticks in 1995 in his meat-processing plant. Soon after, Lekkes was involved in stealing a shipment of Tommy Hilfiger clothing from Asia for Matticks at the port of Montreal, and he also became involved in stealing chickens intended for Europe. Having gained Mattick's trust, Lekkes testified that he was sent to Colombia to make contact with the Cali Cartel.

Lekkes signed a statement for the Crown stating that Matticks, who controlled the longshoreman's union at the Port of Montreal, had made profits of $22 million from smuggling drugs into the city and had sold the Angels at least 700 kilos of cocaine in the last two years. Lekkes testified: "From different series of importations, we would take a percentage of the product. The first one was 33 percent. That is what we could charge to bring in merchandise for either ourselves or the people who owned it...We had different people we sold to. Namely one was Norm Robitaille. He was a Hells Angel".

On 6 August 2001, Matticks pleaded guilty to the drug charges in exchange for a lesser sentence. Matticks was sentenced to 12 years in prison. At his sentencing hearing, Gerald Mattrick's own lawyer admitted that his client controlled the port of Montreal and would demand a cut of anything illegal coming in. The Crown seized all of Matticks's property and assets as the proceeds of crime and in June 2004 Matticks was given an order by the Quebec Department of Revenue for some $2.1 million in unpaid taxes on illegal income.

Lekkes later testified at other trials in 2002 and 2003 that he regularly took cardboard boxes containing about $500,000 in cash from the Hells Angels as payments to the West End Gang. Lekkes also testified that the frozen chickens and turkeys that Matticks was so generous in donating to Catholic charities at Thanksgiving and Christmas times were stolen from container ships meant to export the chickens to grocery stores in Europe. Inspired by Lekkes's example, John McLean, one of Matticks's lieutenants, agreed to turn Crown's evidence and to testify against Matticks's son, Donald, in exchange for an 8-year prison sentence. Lekkes received a 7-year prison sentence with the promise that he would receive a new identity and police protection for the rest of his life when he was released, and as a result Donald Matticks pleaded guilty in December 2002 rather than face extradition to the United States, where he was wanted on charges of smuggling cocaine. Donald Matticks was accused of importing some $2.1 billion worth of drugs, consisting of 44 tons of hashish and 265 kilograms of cocaine in the years 1999 and 2000. The drugs were sold by the Hells Angels in Quebec, Ontario and New Brunswick. A spokesman for the Port Authority stated that Donald Matticks's conviction was not an issue for them because Donald Matticks was not technically an employee of the port during his 15 years as a checker, but rather of the Maritime Employers Association, a statement that Sher and Marsden used as evidence of the ineffectual responses to the Port Authority to the power of the West End Gang.

During his time in prison, Matticks became a friend of Danny Wolfe, the imprisoned leader of the Indian Posse gang. As Matticks was illiterate while Wolfe was literate, the latter wrote and read letters for the former. Wolfe in a letter to his brother Richard wrote "Running the fucking shit yet he couldn't read or write". When Wolfe asked Matticks as to why he was illiterate, he received the reply that his family was so poor that he had to work as a child rather than attend school. Matticks served as a mentor for Wolfe, recounting his youth in a working-class Montreal neighborhood and recalled how the West End Gang fought off the attempts by the Mafia to take over the port of Montreal. In Montreal, Matticks is widely considered to be a folk hero, seen as the champion of the working class, and his conviction led to a campaign to have him released early.

On 6 August 2010, Matticks was released on parole. One of his parole conditions was Matticks was forbidden to have contact with people with criminal records and not to the enter the Port of Montreal until his sentence was completed in 2014, after which he was free to enter the port and resume his associations.

== Death ==
Matticks died on 21 November 2025, at the age of 85.
