= Raymond Desfossés =

Canadian gangster (1950–2024)

- Born: 22 September 1950; Trois-Rivières, Quebec, Canada
- Died: 31 July 2024 (aged 73)
- Other names: "Trifluvien", "The Cocaine King of Trois-Rivières"
- Occupation: Gangster
- Allegiance: West End Gang
- Convictions: Murder (1998); Drug trafficking (2005); Conspiracy to commit murder (2014)
- Penalty: 12 years' imprisonment (1998); 13 years' imprisonment (2005); 20 years' imprisonment (2014)

Raymond Desfossés (22 September 1950 – 31 July 2024), also known as "Trifluvien", was a Canadian gangster and senior member of the West End Gang of Montreal.

== Criminal career ==
=== "The Cocaine King of Trois-Rivières" ===
Born in Trois-Rivières, Desfossés joined the Montreal-based West End Gang in the early 1970s and he became closely associated with the group's leaders, Frank "Dunie" Ryan and Allan "the Weasel" Ross. Overseeing the gang's drug operations in his hometown, he earned the sobriquet "Le roi de la cocaïne de Trois-Rivières" ("The Cocaine King of Trois-Rivières"). Desfossés was also given the nickname "Trifluvien" in underworld circles, which is a Québécois term for a resident of Trois-Rivières. He developed a reputation as a businessman-like operator, who had many connections and who spoke English very well. Desfossés was suspected by police in three murders which allegedly took place at the Rio nightclub in Trois-Rivières in the early 1970s. No bodies were ever found, however, and the murders remain unsolved despite several excavations at the site. In 1975, Desfossés became acquainted with Gérald Gallant while they were both incarcerated at Cowansville. Gallant would later tell police: "...Desfossés really impressed me. He controlled drug trafficking inside the penitentiary. He was a real big crime boss." Gallant was retained as a hitman for Desfossés between 1980 and 2001, carrying out at least six contract killings, for which he was paid $10,000 to $12,000 per murder. The first murder that Gallant committed on Desfossés' behalf occurred on 30 January 1980, when Louis Desjardins, a drug dealer who Desfossés suspected of cooperating with authorities, was lured to a tyre garage owned by Gallant in Port-Cartier and shot in the head. Although he did not order the hit, Desfossés provided Gallant with a driver, Réjean-Claude Juneau, for the 16 February 1984 assassination of Marcel Lefrançois in Sainte-Foy. Lefrançois was murdered because he had refused to pay Gallant for the contract killing of André Haince, who was executed two years earlier.

On 8 August 1984, Desfossés was arrested on charges relating to a $134,000 Brink's truck robbery which took place at a Knob Hill Farms food terminal in Pickering, Ontario on 29 June 1984. Police also seized $5,000 that matched some of the money taken in the robbery after a search of his home. Desfossés' first trial in the case ended in a mistrial in October 1988 due to procedural errors. While on bail, he was travelling regularly between Quebec and Florida. Desfossés was ultimately acquitted of the charges on 29 January 1990 when judge Richard Lovekin ruled that the warrant used by police to raid his residence in August 1984 had been obtained illegally.

Desfossés became the right hand man to Allan Ross, who succeeded Frank Ryan as boss of the West End Gang after Ryan was shot dead in November 1984. Desfossés and fellow West End Gang member Alain Strong were dispatched to the United States by Ross after he decided to eliminate another member, David Singer. Singer had gone into hiding in Florida after killing Eddie Phillips, a conspirator in the assassination of Ryan, in March 1985. Ross had doubts whether Singer could handle a potential police interrogation, leading him to order Singer's murder. Desfossés and Strong met with John Quitoni, another of Ross' associates, who provided them with a loaded .38 caliber revolver. On 10 May 1985, Singer was lured into a stolen car with Desfossés and Strong, after which Strong fatally shot him three times in the head and chest. Singer's body was discarded at the side of a road in Dania Beach. Desfossés and Strong were then pursued by Florida Highway Patrol officer Michael Foti after running a red light. Desfossés pulled the vehicle over and then opened fire as Foti approached, wounding him in the leg, before fleeing the scene. Quitoni drove the two Canadians to the airport the following day and they returned to Quebec. Strong was identified by a witness, however, and the Montreal telephone number of Ross' wife, Elaine Cohen, was also found by police on Singer's person. This evidence allowed authorities to link Desfossés to the murder.

According to testimony from Montreal drug trafficker-turned-Crown witness Gaétan Lafond, Désfosses visited him in Florida in 1990 and warned him that the Montreal "Consortium" – a committee made up of the West End Gang, the Rizzuto crime family and the Hells Angels that fixes drug prices in the city – had sent him to tell Lafond that the crime bosses of Quebec were unhappy with him as he was selling cocaine at too low a price. Desfossés contracted Gérald Gallant to kill Salvatore Luzi, the co-owner of a Montreal strip club with Ross, in Lorraine on 28 May 1990. Police believe the motive for the killing involved money lost in the business by Ross. On 18 March 1991, Gallant assassinated West End Gang associate Richard "Ricky" McGurnaghan at the Olympic Tavern in Pointe-Saint-Charles in another killing ordered by Desfossés. Like Luzi, McGurnaghan had also been feuding with Ross in the months preceding his death; he reportedly slashed Ross' face with a broken beer bottle during a physical altercation in December 1990. In the summer of 1991, Desfossés was photographed attending the wedding of Milena Di Maulo and Francesco Cotroni Jr., son of Cotroni crime family boss Frank Cotroni, at the Mary, Queen of the World Cathedral in Montreal.

=== Trials and imprisonment ===
Desfossés was arrested and detained while driving on Autoroute 40 near Louiseville on 24 March 1992 after U.S. authorities requested his extradition on several charges, including the murder of David Singer and the attempted murder of Michael Foti. He was held at the Parthenais Detention Centre in Montreal while challenging his extradition to Florida, which was approved in September 1997 after the Supreme Court of Canada refused to hear his appeal. On 29 May 1998, Desfossés pleaded no contest to the charge of non-premeditated murder and was sentenced to twelve years in prison. His lawyer John Howes explained that Desfossés "took this deal because he wanted to be home in Canada on time for his 30th wedding anniversary next summer". Howes estimated that Desfossés would be paroled within fourteen months because he had already spent seven years in custody while fighting his extradition. In November 1998, the Royal Canadian Mounted Police (RCMP) accused Desfossés, Roger Forgues, Pierre "Panache" Tremblay, and four others of importing 210 kilograms of cocaine into Quebec in early 1987. The Canadian government decided against pursuing the extradition of Desfossés, the alleged leader of the drug ring, however. He was transferred to a Canadian penitentiary before being released on parole in early 2000.

Desfossés aligned himself with the Rock Machine during the final years of the Quebec Biker War, and he put a $250,000 murder contract on the head of Hells Angels leader Maurice "Mom" Boucher in the summer of 2000. Gérald Gallant planned a hit on Boucher but the plan was called off due to the intense police surveillance Boucher was under at the time. According to Sylvain Boulanger, a member of the Hells Angels' Sherbrooke chapter who became a cooperating witness for the Crown, the Angels in turn offered $100,000 to anyone willing to kill Desfossés. Desfossés also ordered the killing of Hells Angels associate and loanshark Robert "Bob" Savard, who was shot dead by Gallant at a restaurant in Montréal-Nord on 7 July 2000. Another loanshark, former Quebec Nordiques hockey player Norm Descôteaux, and a waitress, Hélène Brunet, were also wounded during the shooting after Descôteaux used Brunet as a human shield. On 30 May 2001, Gallant killed bar manager Yvon Daigneault and wounded Michel Paquette in a case of mistaken identity in Sainte-Adèle. Gallant's intended target was Claude Faber, a former associate of the West End Gang who owed $250,000 to Desfossés. Desfossés supplied Gallant with the wrong licence plate number while providing instructions for the hit, however.

On 8 September 2004, Desfossés and 25 other criminals linked to the West End Gang, Hells Angels, and the Mafia were arrested in Project Calvette, an RCMP investigation that revealed he was the ringleader of a network that imported cocaine from South America to Quebec. The arrests followed the seizure of a 750 kilogram cocaine shipment found on board the ship Le Gabriela, which was intercepted by the United States Coast Guard off the coast of Puerto Rico in August 2003. RCMP inspector Serge Thériault stated following the arrests: "(Desfossés) has associations with all the major criminal organizations, from bikers to the Italian Mafia, and he had contacts in South America, Europe and Asia". In 2005, he pleaded guilty to his leading role in the enterprise and was sentenced to thirteen years' imprisonment.

Desfossés was among eleven people arrested by the Sûreté du Québec on 26 March 2009 as part of Project Baladeur, a vast investigation into 28 murders and 13 attempted murders carried out in the province between 1978 and 2003. He was already in custody at the medium-security Leclerc Institution in St-Vincent-de-Paul at the time of his indictment. Project Baladeur was aided by testimony from Gérald Gallant, who became a Crown witness after he was arrested in 2006. Desfossés was originally charged with six counts of first-degree murder and three counts of attempted murder, but he ultimately pleaded guilty on 20 February 2014 to a general conspiracy to commit murder. He was sentenced to a twenty-year prison term, to be served concurrently with the sentence he received for cocaine trafficking. On 28 June 2017, as Desfossés was approaching his statutory release date, the Parole Board of Canada imposed the condition that he must reside at a halfway house upon his release from prison. He was allowed to return to his home in January 2018, and other conditions imposed upon him by the parole board were further relaxed on 7 May 2019.

== Death ==
Desfossés died on 31 July 2024, at the age of 73.
