= 2020 Port of Montreal strike =

Strike action at the Port of Montreal

- Date: August 10, 2020 – August 21, 2020
- Location: Montreal, Quebec
- Methods: Demonstrations; Walkout
- Result: Truce

Parties
Canadian Union of Public Employees (Local 375)	Maritime Employers Association (MEA)

The 2020 Port of Montreal strike began at 7:00 AM on August 10, 2020, after Local 375 of the Canadian Union of Public Employees (Syndicat des débardeurs du Port de Montréal) walked off the jobsite. The local had previously voted for an indefinite strike. The strike is part of a dispute dating back to 2018, when the union and management were unable to negotiate a new contract.

== Background ==
The Port of Montreal is Canada's second busiest port of entry with approximately $100 billion worth of goods passing through the port each year. Approximately 1,150 workers are part of CUPE local 375. Working without a contract, CUPE members participated in a series of daytime walkouts during the summer of 2020. On July 27, CUPE launched a four-day protest strike. On July 29, acts of violence and intimidation perpetrated by union members were reported as tension escalated between parties. Again, on August 3, another partial four-day strike was initiated by the Union. In response, management changed working conditions, including premiums offered. On August 4, 99.22% of eligible workers voted in favour of an inifinite strike.

== Strike ==
Shortly after the strike began, the governments of François Legault (Quebec premier) and Doug Ford (Ontario premier), asked for the federal government to intervene to force the strikers back to work. This request was denied, with Labour Minister Filomena Tassi writing that "Our government has faith in the collective bargaining process, as we know the best deals are made at the table." Tensions were heightened during the finals days of the strike after the Maritime Employers Association announced its intention to use replacement workers to unload the sitting containers on August 19. However, A truce was agreed upon on August 21 which allowed the port to reopen two days later. The two sides agreed to resume contract talks and the union pledged to continue working without a labour stoppage for the next seven months after which time the union would resume its right to strike.
