= Allan Ross (gangster) =

Canadian gangster (1944–2018)

- Ross's 1 May 1979 mugshot
- Born: Alan Ronald Ross; 17 April 1944; Montreal, Quebec, Canada
- Died: 21 August 2018 (aged 74); Butner, North Carolina, U.S.
- Other name: "Allan the Weasel"
- Occupation: Gangster
- Years active: 1962–1992
- Known for: Boss of the West End Gang
- Predecessor: Frank Ryan
- Successor: Gerald Matticks
- Allegiance: West End Gang
- Convictions: Possession of a narcotic for the purposes of trafficking (1980); Conspiracy to traffic in cocaine (1992); Conspiracy to traffic in cocaine, and first-degree murder (1993)
- Penalty: 23 months' imprisonment (1980); Life imprisonment (1992); 30 years' imprisonment (1993)

Allan Ronald Ross (17 April 1944 – 21 August 2018), better known as "Allan the Weasel", was a Canadian gangster best known for leading the West End Gang of Montreal. At the time of his arrest in Florida in 1991, he was described by American law enforcement as the fifth most important drug kingpin in the world.

== Criminal career ==
=== Thief ===
Ross was born as Alan Ross, but he was usually known as Allan. Unlike most other West End Gang members who grew up in poverty, Ross was born into a well off family in the middle class district of Notre-Dame-de-Grâce in Montreal. The West End Gang has an average of about 150 members at any given moment and most come from the Pointe-Saint-Charles district of Montreal. Ross's criminal record began at the age of 18 when he was arrested three times within a period of five months for automobile theft, a home invasion and automobile theft again. He was first convicted of a criminal offense, namely automobile theft, on 8 May 1962. Ross joined the West End Gang in the 1960s, and rose up to become the right-hand man to the boss Frank "Dunie" Ryan.

Initially only a lowly thief and a truck hijacker, Ross started to rise to prominence in 1976 when Ryan put him in charge of the West End Gang's drug operations. The journalist Dan Burke, who knew Ross as a teenager in the 1970s, recalled that he and his associates liked to play pool at Smitty's Bar, saying it was "like a scene out of Goodfellas. That's what it was like". In 1980, Ross was convicted of possession of a narcotic for the purposes of trafficking and sentenced to 23 months in prison. He was friends with Frankie Cotroni, the son of Frank Cotroni, the number two man in the Cotroni family, which proved to be a useful connection. In 1984, following the death of his older brother Vic Cotroni due to cancer, Frank Cotroni became the new boss of the Cotroni family. Another connection Ross forged was with Sidney "Sid" Leithman, a high-profile lawyer who was the preferred defense counsel for gangsters in Montreal. Leithman had successfully defended several members of the West End Gang, most notably Ryan. Leithman who was a workaholic often used cocaine to relieve legal-related stress. Ross was generous in supplying Leithman with cocaine.

=== The "Emperor of Coke" ===
When Ryan was murdered on 13 November 1984, Ross took command of the West End Gang. His first action as leader was to hire the hitman Yves "Apache" Trudeau of the Hells Angels' Laval chapter to hunt down and kill those responsible for the murder of Ryan. At Ryan's funeral at St. Augustine of Canterbury Catholic Church, the police observed Ross talking to three Hells Angels, namely Laurent "L'anglais" Viau, Michel Blass and Yves Trudeau. Viau was the president of the Angels Laval chapter, to which both Blass and Trudeau were members of, and it is believed that the subject of the conversation was Ross seeking permission from Viau to have Trudeau and Blass hunt down Ryan's killers.

The man responsible for Ryan's murder, Paul April, was boasting that with Ryan dead, he was now roi de Montréal ("king of Montreal"). On 19 November 1984, Trudeau visited April's apartment to pay his respects to the self-proclaimed roi de Montréal on behalf of the Hells Angels. During the visit, Trudeau noticed that April did not have a functioning television, and he promised him that he would bring him one along with a VCR. On 25 November 1984, Trudeau and Blass dropped off a TV, a VCR and a video tape to the apartment where Ryan's killers, Paul April and Robert Lelièvre, were hiding. Also in apartment 917 that day were Gilles Paquette, a petty criminal, and Louis Charles, a professional bank robber who had met April while they were in Saint-Vincent-de-Paul penitentiary. After leaving the apartment, Trudeau used a remote control to set off a bomb that he had hidden inside the TV. The explosion killed both April and Lelièvre plus the two other men in the apartment. The explosion caused by the fifteen kilograms of C-4 plastic explosive hidden inside the TV was so powerful as to rip apart the bodies of all four men to such extent that the police had much difficulty in identifying what remained of the corpses that were spattered around apartment 917. Trudeau later testified: "I showed them the power of the Hells Angels".

Trudeau had been promised by Ross that he would pay him $200,000 to kill April, and he had been paid $25,000 in advance. When Trudeau tried to collect the rest of the $200,000 after killing April and Lelièvre, Ross told him he should go collect the money from the Halifax and Sorel chapters of the Hells Angels who owned the West End Gang drug debts, saying he would forgive those debts if those chapters paid the money to Trudeau instead. The president of the Hells Angels Halifax chapter, David "Wolf" Carroll, paid Trudeau $98,000. Carroll later learned that the Laval chapter was actually entitled to one-quarter of the money, and that Trudeau had used the extra money to support his cocaine addiction. As the Halifax chapter was much poorer than the Laval chapter, Trudeau's behavior was considered to be especially crass. Trudeau's stealing from the Halifax chapter led directly to the Lennoxville massacre of March 1985.

The third man involved in the plot to kill Ryan, Eddie Philips, was murdered in March 1985 by a West End Gang member David Singer. On 25 March 1985, Philips was invited to drink with Billy McAllister of the West End Gang at the Victoria Station bar on rue de Jean Talon in Mount Royal. As Philips was walking towards the bar in the parking lot, a motorcycle rode up to him while Singer, who was in the passenger seat, stepped off and shot Philips five times in the back. Singer then jumped back on the motorcycle. The driver of the motorcycle has never been conclusively identified.

Singer went to Florida to hide out, but Ross had doubts whether he could handle a police interrogation, leading him to order Singer's murder. Ross had gone into business with John Quitoni, a former New Jersey state trooper. In May 1985, during a visit to Fort Lauderdale, Ross requested that Quitoni work with Alain Strong, a West End Gang member. On 10 May 1985, Strong paged Quitoni that he needed a handgun, which Quitoni provided. Later that night, Strong together with another West End Gang member, Raymond Desfossés, murdered Singer. Found inside of the pockets of Singer's pants was a piece of paper with the telephone number for Ross's wife.

On 28 August 1985, Trudeau, who had turned Crown's evidence after the Lenoxville massacre, testified that it was Ross who had hired him to kill April and Lelièvre in November 1984. Despite Trudeau's testimony, the Canadian authorities took no action against Ross, under the grounds that the word of a hitman was not to be trusted, although that did not stop the authorities from charging Hells Angels on the basis of Trudeau's testimony. Ross lacked the charisma of Ryan and was respected rather than loved by the West End Gang. Ross was also considered to be more greedy than Ryan as Ross would not assist other members of the West End Gang facing financial issues with money as Ryan had frequently done. Ryan had often paid the rent of West End Gang members facing eviction, a practice that Ross discontinued. The moniker of "Allan the Weasel", or la Belette as he was known to French-Canadians, reflected his weasel-like face and his ability to "weasel" out of any situation.

In the late 1980s, Ross was a successful drug dealer who frequently went to Florida and Aruba to import cocaine, marijuana and hashish. Forming a partnership with a U.S.-based cell of the Cali Cartel, Ross took charge of a drug smuggling network running from Florida to Quebec. Ryan had been known as the "king of coke", but Ross, who was even more successful as a drug dealer, became known as the "emperor of coke". Ross was a crucial player into a drug smuggling network that brought cocaine from South America into Montreal. He also imported heroin from the "Golden Triangle" nations of Thailand, Burma and Laos, and the "Golden Crescent" nations of Afghanistan, Pakistan, and Iran.

Starting in late 1984, cars equipped with secret compartments delivered fifteen-kilogram packages of cocaine on a biweekly basis. By 1986, the amount of cocaine being smuggled had increased to 20–40 kilograms. In 1987, Ross started to export cocaine to the Netherlands and the United Kingdom. In 1986, he met with a Scottish drug dealer, William Blackledge, in Florida to arrange for cocaine to shipped to Europe. Ross was greatly helped by the fact that Inspector Claude Savoie, the director of the Royal Canadian Mounted Police (RCMP)'s drug squad and assistant director of the Criminal Intelligence Service, was working for him. The conduit between Ross and Savoie was a prominent Montreal lawyer, Sidney Leithman, who was Ross's lawyer. Ross paid Savoie $200,000 per week for his information. In late 1989, Leithman introduced Savoie to Ross at a meeting in his office, and brokered the deal under which Savoie would sell information to Ryan. The police eventually concluded that Ross knew too much about their activities, and that he must have a "mole" within their ranks. In 1989, the United States Drug Enforcement Administration (DEA) listed Ross as one of the biggest drug dealers in the entire world.

According to prosecutors, Ross was behind two contract killings carried out by the hitman Gérald Gallant under order from West End Gang lieutenant Raymond Desfossés. Gallant fatally shot Salvatore Luzi, the co-owner of a Montreal strip club with Ross, in Lorraine on 28 May 1990. Police believe the motive for the killing involved money lost in the business by Ross. On 18 March 1991, Gallant murdered West End Gang associate Richard "Ricky" McGurnaghan at the Olympic Tavern in Pointe-Saint-Charles. Like Luzi, McGurnaghan had also been feuding with Ross in the months preceding his death; he reportedly slashed Ross' face with a broken beer bottle during a physical altercation in December 1990. While Ross ultimately escaped prosecution for the murders of Luzi and McGurnaghan, Gallant and Desfossés pleaded guilty to their roles in the killings in 2009 and 2014, respectively.

=== Downfall ===
In 1990, Quitoni was arrested in El Paso, Texas for drug smuggling. In exchange for a lesser sentence, Quitoni revealed to the American authorities his involvement in Singer's murder in 1985. On 13 May 1991, Leithman was murdered in Montreal. In October 1991, Ross was arrested in Fort Lauderdale. The U.S. Marshals arrested Ross on 7 October 1991 as he was arriving at the airport. After his arrest, he told Detective Chris Dale of the Broward County Sheriff's Office: "Not that I would, but it sure would be nice if I could give you $200,000 or so and you would let me go."

After a six-week trial in the spring of 1992, an American jury found Ross guilty of drug trafficking. The trial began on 6 April 1992 and one of those who testified against Ross was an American pilot, Bertram "Bert" Gordon, who testified that he had flown in shipments of cocaine from Canada into the United States in 1987 and 1988. During the trial, Ross was heard to say as he was being led out of the courtroom to a Montreal detective who had arrived to testify against him that "your new TV and VCR is on its way". An American court guard who heard the exchange reported it to the judge who summoned the detective to chambers to discuss what sounded like an offer of a bribe. The detective had to explain that the remark was instead a threat as Ross was referring to the assassination of April in 1984 who had been killed by a bomb planted in his new TV which he had received alongside a free VCR. On 15 May 1992, a jury in Gainesville found Ross guilty of charges of conspiracy to traffic in a least 10,000 kilograms of cocaine plus more than 300 tons of marijuana from 1975 to 1989. The judge sentenced him to life imprisonment with no chance of parole plus fined him $10 million U.S. dollars.

In the meantime, the media had become curious about Leithman's murder, and started to probe the links between Savoie, Leithman and Ross. The fact that the American police agencies investigating Ross refused to share information with the Canadian police forces under the grounds that they suspected that there was a police "leak" became the source of some scandal in Canada. American law enforcement complained that whatever information that was shared with the RCMP always seemed to reach Ross. The Fifth Estate television show aired a segment about the connections between the three men. The scandal ended with Savoie killing himself.

In 1993, Ross was convicted of another set of drug charges together with the murder of Singer. During the trial, it was revealed that Ross had offered the Hells Angels $13,000 for killing Quitoni. On 29 October 1993, Ross was found guilty of first-degree murder. In the 1993 case, the judge sentenced Ross to 30 years in prison atop of his life sentence. About his conviction, Ross was quoted as saying: "They can ship my body to Florida to start the last 30 years." Ross was replaced as boss of the West End Gang by Gerald Matticks.

In May 2009, Ross asked for the fine to be waived under the grounds that he had colon cancer. In a letter, Ross stated he had not been able to work within the prison for the last twelve years because of his poor health, while his wife and mother were paying the fine. He wrote: "In the last few years it has been a hardship on my family and myself. My wife is 64 years old and due to health problems, now only works part time. My mom is 86 years old and just had a knee replacement, she lives on her old age pension... I can no longer impose upon my family in these difficult times". The judge refused his request. In February 2017, he appealed in court for an early release on the grounds that he was dying of colon cancer, which a judge refused. Ross died in the Federal Medical Center, Butner in North Carolina of complications from colon cancer.

== Books ==
- Auger, Michel; Edwards, Peter (2012). The Encyclopedia of Canadian Organized Crime: From Captain Kidd to Mom Boucher. Toronto: McClelland & Stewart. ISBN 978-0771030499.
- Langton, Jerry (2010). Showdown: How the Outlaws, Hells Angels and Cops Fought for Control of the Streets. Toronto: John Wiley & Sons. ISBN 978-0470678787.
- O'Connor, D'Arcy (2011). Montreal's Irish Mafia: The True Story of the Infamous West End Gang. Toronto: John Wiley & Sons.
- Schneider, Stephen (2009). Iced: The Story of Organized Crime in Canada. Toronto: John Wiley & Sons. ISBN 978-0470835005..
