= West End Gang =

Irish-Canadian criminal organization

- Founded: 1950s
- Founding location: Montreal, Quebec, Canada
- Years active: 1950s–present
- Territory: Primarily Greater Montreal, with additional territory throughout Quebec, as well as South Florida
- Ethnicity: Predominantly Irish Canadian, as well as French Canadian
- Membership (est.): 125–150 members and associates
- Leaders: Frank Ryan; Allan Ross Daniel Serero; Gerald Matticks; Shane Maloney
- Activities: Drug trafficking, contract killing, extortion, racketeering, illegal gambling, gun-running, prostitution, and money laundering
- Allies: Cali Cartel; Cotroni crime family; Hells Angels MC; Provisional IRA; Rizzuto crime family; Rock Machine MC
- Rivals: Dubois family
- Notable members: Raymond Desfossés

The West End Gang (French: Gang de l'ouest) is a Canadian organized crime group in Montreal, Quebec. An Irish mob group originating from the Irish-Canadian ethnic enclave of Pointe-Saint-Charles in the 1950s, the majority of the gang's earnings were initially derived from truck hijackings, home invasions, kidnapping, protection rackets, extortion, and armed robbery, with its criminal activities focused on, but not restricted to, the west side of Montreal. The West End Gang came to prominence via a series of high-profile bank robberies between the 1950s and the 1970s, a period when Montreal was known as "Bank Robbery capital of North America". Due to the gang's control of illegal activity at the Port of Montreal, it moved into drug trafficking and became one of the most influential criminal organizations in Canada.

Over the years many members have been murdered or convicted of murder, most notably the 1984 assassination of one time West End Gang boss Frank "Dunie" Ryan. Subsequent revenge killings weeks later are believed to have been organized by replacement leader Allan "The Weasel" Ross. Under Ross' leadership, the West End Gang formed a partnership with the Cali Cartel, transporting large quantitites of cocaine into Canada from the United States. After Ross was convicted in 1992, leadership of the West End Gang was assumed by Gerald "Big Gerry" Matticks.

== History ==
=== Origin ===
The West End Gang originated as a network of loosely affiliated Irish-Canadian gangsters in Montreal. The gang, which emerged in the 1950s, was known at first as the Irish Gang, and the name West End Gang seems to have been adopted in the late 1970s. A disproportionate number of the gang's members come from the predominantly Irish working-class Pointe-Saint-Charles district of Montreal. Other West End Gang members are from the Goose Village and Griffintown neighbourhoods. Additionally, bars and motels in the Notre-Dame-de-Grâce district have served as headquarters and meeting places for members of the gang.

Describing the origins of the West End Gang and how it differs from the other prominent crime groups in Montreal, the journalist Julian Sher said: "The thing about the Hells Angels and the Mafia is those are global organizations... The West End Gang could only be born and thrive in this city and in a particular neighbourhood of this city. They had no desire to take over Toronto or even the north of the city. This was such an English-Montreal product. It's like Fairmount Bagels". On the significance of the gang's ethnic makeup and the location from which it merged, Julian explained: "One of the reasons the West End Gang was able to thrive is that they were able to some degree to fly under the radar, in a largely French city with a largely French police force. The West End Gang came out of a community that was doubly marginalized. They're an English minority in a French city, but they're also poor and they're Irish in English Montreal. They're poor in a largely middle-class anglophone community. The Lachine Canal and the Ville-Marie Expressway could've been a fortress wall".

=== Bank robbery ===
From the 1950s to the 1970s, Montreal was known as the "Bank Robbery capital of North America" as Montreal had more bank robberies than any other city in North America. The journalist D'Arcy O'Connor used as an example that in the six months between January-June 1969, Montreal had 51 bank robberies with only a quarter with the thieves being arrested, while the city of Los Angeles had 36 bank robberies in the period January-June 1969 with 60% of the thieves being arrested. The West End Gang were some of the most successful bank robbers in Montreal in this period. Montreal's status as the "Bank Robbery capital of North America" was largely due to the light sentences handed by Quebec courts, which normally gave only 5 years in prison for convicted thieves as compared to the 20 years in prison normally handed down by American courts, which allowed the gangs of Montreal to build up a cadre of experienced thieves. The largest bank robbery ever in Canadian history adjusted for inflation, namely the theft of some $20,000 in cash from the vault of the Brockville Trust & Saving Company in Brockville on 4 May 1958 was a joint operation of the West End Gang and the Cotroni family. Commander André Bouchard of the Montreal police stated about the West End Gang that they: "...weren't thugs selling drugs on the street like the French and the Italians...They had the best safecrackers and the best hijackers. Some of those guys were sixteen years old and today they're still at it".

Typical of the West End Gang members were William "Billy" Morgan who was born in poverty to Irish-Canadian parents in Montreal in 1935 and grew up in a broken home, leading him to boast in a 2008 interview: "I was a thief by the age of seven". Being placed "in care" in various foster homes, Morgan joined the West End Gang as a teenager and boasted: "Back then, I could open any lock or crack any safe and I did a lot of that. I had a knack for it".

In the 1960s, West End Gang hitman Richard Blass was involved in minor fights with many Mafiosi, particularly those related to Frank Cotroni and brothers Joe and Vincenzo Di Maulo, all of whom received death threats from Blass.

Several of the West End Gang robberies led to deaths. In an attempted robbery of a branch of the Bank of Montreal on the Beaver Hall Hill on 3 May 1971 led to a shoot-out with Raymond Lynch of the West End Gang being shot dead by the bank security guards together with an innocent by-stander Corrado Festa who was killed when he was caught in the cross-fire. On 12 September 1973, a group of West End Gang thieves led by William "Billy" MacAllister attempted to rob a Brinks armored car that again led to a shoot-out that led one of the Brinks guards, Claude Vienneau being shot and bleeding to death on the street as the robbers fled with some $278,000 in cash from the armored car. The most successful robbery committed by the West End Gang in Montreal was the theft of some $2,275,884 in cash together with golden Olympic coins worth $5,000 from a Brinks armored car took on 30 March 1976. In April 1976, the Montreal police formed a special squad known as the "Rubber Duck Squad" led by detective André Savard whose sole task was to hunt down those involved in the Brinks robbery of 30 March 1976. On 14 May 1976, a West End Gang member involved in the Brinks robbery, John Slawvey, was killed in a shoot-out with Savard who was attempting to arrest him on charges of robbery. On the night after Slawvey's killing, Savard was phoned by the lawyer Sidney Leithman who told him: "There's a lot of talk going and I think you should be careful, André. There's a lot of people not happy and you can push only so much...call this a warning if you want, but be careful and take care". Savard heard rumors that the West End Gang leader Frank Ryan had placed a $50,000 contract on his life, which caused to live under armed guard for some time afterwards.

=== Move into drug trafficking ===
Under Frank Ryan's leadership, the West End Gang moved from local rackets, bank heists and truck robberies into cross-border drug smuggling. In the 1970s, the gang took control of the Port of Montreal, which allowed them to import narcotics. The West End Gang initially began to import significant quantities of marijuana and hashish before Ryan and Allan Ross started smuggling large shipments of cocaine into Canada from Florida as the drug's popularity increased in the early 1980s. The West End gang developed important contacts in the United States, South America and Europe, with some members working out of Florida.

In 1980, Allan Ross was convicted of possession of a narcotic for the purposes of trafficking and sentenced to a 23-month prison term.

Since that time, the gang has formulated ties to the Montreal Mafia, the Cosa Nostra, the Hells Angels, and Colombian cartels. The three Montreal organizations (West End Gang, Montreal Mafia, Hells Angels) make up the "Consortium" (similar to New York City's "Commission") and, together, the three groups' leaders fix the price of drugs for the wholesale and retail markets. The majority of the drugs smuggled through Montreal are ultimately retailed in the United States, with the small remainder being distributed across Canada. Police estimate that over a 15-year span from the late 1970s to the early 1990s, the gang trafficked more than 40 tons of cocaine and 300 tons of hashish, with an estimated street value of $150 billion. In 1997, the federal government disbanded the National Ports Police as a cost-saving measure, which has greatly aided the work of the West End Gang.

=== Murders ===
Patrick "Hughie" McGurnaghan, a cocaine dealer who sourced the drug from Frank Ryan, accrued a $100,000 debt to Ryan, partly because he used much of the cocaine he was supposed to be selling. When McGurnaghan cheated Ryan on a drug deal, Ryan contracted the Hells Angels hitman Yves "Apache" Trudeau to kill him. On 27 October 1981, McGurnaghan was driving his Mercedes-Benz along Melville Avenue in Westmount with two male passengers when Trudeau detonated a car bomb planted underneath the hood, killing McGurnaghan and seriously injuring a passenger.

On 13 November 1984, Frank Ryan was in his office at the Nittolo's Jardin Motel in Notre-Dame-de-Grâce, a motel and restaurant he owned which was a regular meeting place for West End Gang members. He was lured into an adjoining motel room by Paul April, a French-Canadian associate who told Ryan that an attractive young woman waiting to have sex with him there. April and an associate of his, Robert Lelièvre, who was armed with a shotgun, planned to tie Ryan to a chair and force him to reveal where he had hidden his fortune before killing him. Ryan resisted and threw a chair at Lelièvre, who then shot him in the chest. As Ryan lay dying on the floor, he was shot again in the head with a .45 handgun. By killing Ryan, April and Lelièvre erased a $200,000 drug debt they owed him.

Allan Ross took control of the West End Gang after Ryan's death. Ross' first action as leader was to hire Yves Trudeau to track down and kill those responsible for Ryan's murder. Paul April was boasting that, with Ryan dead, he was now roi de Montréal ("king of Montreal"). On 19 November 1984, Trudeau visited April's highrise apartment on De Maisonneuve Boulevard under the pretence of paying his respects to the self-proclaimed roi de Montréal on behalf of the Hells Angels. During the visit, Trudeau noticed that April did not have a functioning television, and he promised him that he would bring him one along with a videocassette recorder. On 25 November 1984, Trudeau and his occasional accomplice Michel Blass dropped off a TV set with fifteen kilograms of C-4 plastic explosive hidden inside, along with a VCR and a video tape of Hells Angels Forever to the apartment where April and Robert Lelièvre were hiding. Also in the apartment that day were Gilles Paquette, a petty criminal, and Louis Charles, a professional bank robber who had met April while they were imprisoned together at Saint-Vincent-de-Paul penitentiary. After leaving the apartment, Trudeau used a remote control to detonate the bomb. The explosion killed both April and Lelièvre along with Paquette and Charles. Eight bystanders were also injured. Ross paid for the murders by erasing a large drug debt owed to the West End Gang by the Laval chapter of the Hells Angels.

The third conspirator in the murder of Frank Ryan was Eddie Phillips, who was suspected by Allan Ross of renting the motel room where Ryan was killed. Phillips was invited to drink with West End Gang member Billy McAllister at the Victoria Station bar on rue de Jean Talon in Mount Royal on 25 March 1985. As Phillips was walking towards the bar in the parking lot, a motorcycle rode up to him while another member of the West End Gang, David Singer, who was in the passenger seat, stepped off and shot Phillips five times in the back. The driver of the motorcycle has never been conclusively identified. Singer subsequently went into hiding in Florida, but Ross had doubts whether he could handle a police interrogation, leading him to order Singer's murder.

=== "Kings of Coke" ===
Under the leadership of Allan Ross, the West End Gang became involved in even more ambitious international drug schemes. While the West End Gang trafficked primarily in hashish and marijuana under Frank Ryan's regime, the gang moved more heavily into cocaine after Ross took control. The gang forged a partnership with a Florida-based cell of the Cali Cartel, transporting kilograms of cocaine into Canada via Nashville, Tennessee. Ross also formed contacts in the "Golden Triangle" in Southeast Asia and in the "Golden Crescent" nations of Afghanistan, Turkey and Pakistan. According to informants, by 1986, cocaine shipments of between 20 and 40 kilograms were being delivered to Montreal every two weeks. By 1987, Ross' deals with the Cali Cartel included shipments of up to 200 kilograms being sent to the Netherlands and the United Kingdom.

On 15 May 1992, Allan Ross was convicted in Gainesville, Florida of conspiring to import and traffic in at least 10,000 kilograms of cocaine and more than 300 tonnes of marijuana between 1975 and 1989, for which he was sentenced to life in prison. The following year, he was sentenced to an additional 30 years' imprisonment when he was found guilty in Fort Lauderdale, Florida of conspiring to traffic in cocaine and conspiracy to commit murder. After Ross was imprisoned, leadership of the West End Gang was assumed by Gerald "Big Gerry" Matticks.

30 members and associate of the West End Gang were arrested in Montreal on 17 April 1996 on charges of conspiracy to import, importing, trafficking or possession of narcotics as part of the RCMP investigation Operation Caviar.

=== 21st century ===
In 2003 onetime gang associate Peter MacAllister wrote a novel called Dexter based on real stories from the gang.

In 2005, a 300 kilogram shipment of a total 1,300 kilograms of cocaine, co-organized by Rizzuto crime family confidante, Francesco Del Balso and West End Gang member, Richard Griffin, was intercepted in Boucherville, Quebec by police. After Griffin invested $1.5 million in the purchase and transportation of the cocaine, he demanded $350,000 from the Rizzutos for not taking preventive measures in transporting the drugs. After arguments about the debts, Griffin was killed by gunfire outside his home in Notre-Dame-de-Grâce on July 12, 2006.

A key member of the gang in recent years was Shane Kenneth Maloney, known as "Wheels" as he uses a wheelchair. On 27 October 2011, an officer with the Service de police de la Ville de Montréal on vacation in Playa del Carmen in Mexico saw two other officers of Service de police de la Ville de Montréal socializing with members of the West End Gang and the Montreal Hells Angels at the Blue Parrot nightclub. Upset with the apparent corruption, the officer used his cellphone to take pictures of the officers socializing with the gangsters at the Blue Parrot. Led by Maloney who noticed the policeman taking the photographs, the Hells Angels and the West End Gang members proceed to beat the policeman bloody, who required five hours of surgery in order to make his face resemble what it had been before the beating. The policeman noted that no-one in the management of the Blue Parrot made any attempt to call the police or stop the beating.

Maloney became a key member in the Wolfpack Alliance. On 1 November 2012, Maloney was charged with trafficking in cocaine; gangsterism; and arms smuggling. The police searched Maloney's house and found evidence linking to the theft of dynamite in Sainte-Sophie in August 2011. Found inside of his house were hundreds of guns; 1, 475 sticks of dynamite; two pounds of C-4 explosive and remote controls that could be used for bombs. In December 2013, Maloney was convicted of assault for his role in the Blue Parrot incident of 2011. In April 2017, Maloney was found guilty of the charges relating to his weapons and explosive cache and sentenced to 10 years in prison. Maloney worked as a member of the Wolfpack, but transferred his loyalty towards helping the Sinaloa Cartel in smuggling cocaine direct into Ontario.

Kings of Coke, a documentary film chronicling the history of the West End Gang directed by Julian Sher, was released in November 2022.

Montreal police estimate that the West End Gang currently consists of approximately 125 to 150 members and associates. The group often collaborates with the Montreal Mafia and the Hells Angels in drug shipments and remains a powerful and profitable criminal organizations in the country.

== Historical leadership ==
=== Boss ===
- 1970s–1984 – Frank "Dunie" Ryan – Murdered on 13 November 1984
- 1984–1992 – Allan "the Weasel" Ross – Sentenced to life imprisonment
- 1992–2001 – Gerald "Big Gerry" Matticks – Sentenced to 12 years' imprisonment
- 2001–present – Shane "Wheels" Maloney – Imprisoned 2017–present

== List of murders committed by the West End Gang ==
Name	Date	Reason
Patrick "Hughie" McGurnaghan	27 October 1981	Cocaine dealer McGurnaghan was killed by hitman Yves "Apache" Trudeau under contract from the West End Gang. He was killed by a car bomb while driving his car in Westmount after cheating Frank "Dunie" Ryan in a drug deal. A passenger was also injured.
Frank "Dunie" Ryan	13 November 1984	West End Gang boss Ryan was lured to a motel in the Notre-Dame-de-Grâce neighborhood of Montreal and shot by associates Paul April and Robert Lelièvre in order to erase a $200,000 debt.
David Singer	10 May 1985	Drug dealer Singer was shot by Raymond Desfossés and Alain Strong after being lured into a car in Dania, Florida, on the orders of Allan "the Weasel" Ross, who feared that Singer was on the verge of cooperating with Montreal police. State trooper Michael J. Foti was also wounded.
