= Frank Ryan (gangster) =

Canadian gangster (1942–1984)

- Born: Frank Peter Ryan Jr. 10 June 1942; Montreal, Quebec, Canada
- Died: 13 November 1984 (aged 42); Montreal, Quebec, Canada
- Other name: "Dunie"
- Occupation: Gangster
- Years active: 1956–1984
- Known for: Leader of the West End Gang
- Successor: Allan Ross
- Allegiance: West End Gang
- Convictions: Armed robbery (1962); Manslaughter (1965); Armed robbery (1966)
- Penalty: 15 years' imprisonment (1966)

Frank Peter "Dunie" Ryan Jr. (10 June 1942 – 13 November 1984) was a Canadian gangster and the leader of the West End Gang, a Montreal-based criminal organization.

== Criminal career ==
=== Hoodlum ===
Ryan was born of Irish descent in a poor neighborhood of Montreal. His father, Frank Ryan Sr., abandoned their family when Ryan was three years old, leaving his mother, May, to raise him by herself. Ryan's mother called him "junior", which he mispronounced as "Dunie", which became his lifelong nickname.

Ryan dropped out of school at the age of 16 and led his own teenage gang, who participated in "petty" crimes such as smash and grabs, garment thefts from trucks, and breaking and entering. Ryan's specialty as a teenager was stealing fur coats from delivery trucks and selling them on the black market. By 1962, he already had dozens of convictions for robbery, possession of stolen goods, and possession of a false drivers' license.

Ryan continued his crime spree throughout the 1960s, being convicted of robbery with violence and of burglary. He served both sentences at the St. Vincent de Paul prison. In 1965, Ryan killed a man while driving drunk. His conviction was overturned on a technicality. Ryan felt a much resentment about being charged for manslaughter, and he came to feel a grudge against the Quebec justice system, which he felt was biased against him.

Starting in 1966, Ryan started to frequent the Country Palace on rue Sherbrooke where his biographer, Daniel Burke, wrote: "Hoods from all over the country, but especially the Irish Catholic ghettos, gathered at the Country Palace. Primarily strong arms and bank robbers, the Irish Canadians were an important element of the Montreal underworld, and the nightclub was a mine of contacts for Ryan. There, through the Irish-Canadian links with the Boston underworld, he found the bridge to bigger opportunities and his first costly setback".

Ryan and four other men robbed the Essex County Bank and Trust on 24 August 1966, but were arrested by the Boston police shortly afterwards. He was convicted of bank robbery, for which he served six years of a 15-year sentence in an American prison.

After his parole in December 1972, Ryan joined what was then called the Irish Gang to help him continue his criminal enterprises, which now included loansharking as well as robberies. In 1973, he married Evelyn Lemieux from the Gaspé. Ryan had two children by his wife, Trica and Troy.

Ryan was known for his rambunctious and rowdy personality, often saying he wanted to "live fast, love hard and die young". His easy-going personality made him popular and he soon became the leader of the West End Gang. Ryan's favorite place was Smitty's, a run-down bar on rue Sherbrooke, where he played pool, drank and planned robberies with his Irish-Canadian and French-Canadian associates.

Starting in 1973, Ryan and the West End Gang went on a rampage of robbing jewelry stores and armoured cars for banks. The West End Gang did not have the rigid hierarchical structure of the Mafia and Ryan's status was more as primus inter pares rather as a boss in the traditional sense of the term. Besides robbing jewelry stores and loansharking, Ryan had the West End Gang start selling hashish, and then heroin and cocaine in the 1970s.

Ryan assembled a crew that consisted of Patrick "Hughie" McGurnaghan, Paul April, Allan "The Weasel" Ross, the Matticks brothers, Peter White, and Kenny McPolland as his principal lieutenants. In 1974, Ryan hired as his bodyguard, John "Jake the Snake" McLaughlin, a thief and a hitman suspected of least a dozen murders. McLaughlin was the prime suspect in the murders of George Groom in 1968, James McDonald in 1969, Gary Down in 1970, and Michael French in 1982.

The most successful robbery committed by the West End Gang under Ryan's leadership was the theft of $2,275,884 in cash together with golden Olympic coins worth $5,000 from a Brinks armored car on 30 March 1976. The Montreal newspapers called the robbery-which was the largest robbery ever committed in Montreal-the "crime of the century".

On 14 May 1976, one of the West End Gang members involved in the Brinks robbery, John Slawvey, was killed in a shoot-out with the police, with detective André Savard killing Slawvey. Ryan was enraged by Slawvey's killing, which he regarded as a cold-blooded execution by the police as he insisted that Slawvey was unarmed and was in the process of surrendering when Savard shot him. Ryan placed a $50,000 contract on Savard's life, which was unprecedented, as never before had a gangster in Montreal placed a contract on the life of a policeman. Savard was forced to live in hiding for some time afterwards. Ultimately no hitman proved willing to take up the contract out of the fear of the police reaction to the killing of a policeman, and Savard came out of hiding.

=== The "King of Coke" ===
After his initial forays in the drug market, Ryan realized that this was a market that could be expanded. He soon built a drug network that spread throughout Quebec, Ontario and the Atlantic provinces. The West End Gang, as the Irish Gang had been renamed sometime in the late 1970s, took control of the Port of Montreal, which allowed them to smuggle in drugs on a scale that other gangs could not. Through his connections with the Irish Mob of Boston, Ryan started to import cocaine from Colombia and heroin from the "Golden Crescent" nations of Afghanistan, Pakistan and Iran. Ryan's point-man for the Port of Montreal was Gerald Matticks and his brothers. Ryan was content to be a wholesaler, who sold drugs to the Mafia and the outlaw biker clubs, who in turn sold drugs to the street gangs.

He also began to engage in fund-raising and gun-running for the Irish Republican Army (IRA), both sending and receiving guns from Northern Ireland. Proud of his Irish heritage, Ryan wore a golden Claddagh ring on his third finger. Ryan was rumored to be worth $20 million, which was possibly an exaggeration, through he was clearly wealthy. Ryan's prize possession was his 36-foot yacht that he sailed on the St. Lawrence River.

By the late 1970s, Ryan developed relationships with other criminal organizations in Montreal, including the Hells Angels and Cotroni crime family. Ryan made a deal with Frank Cotroni that the Controni family would buy drugs exclusively from the West End Gang. As both of these criminal organizations depended on Ryan's steady supply of drugs, Ryan was on the top of the criminal foodchain in Quebec.

Ryan was known for his contempt for the other criminal organizations, once saying: "Mafia, pafia. If there's a war, we've got the IRA". Through his American cousin, Peter White, Ryan made an alliance with the Irish Mob of Boston. Ryan also formed an alliance with Yves Buteau, the national president of the Hells Angels, who became one of his largest customers. Buteau also become Ryan's main subcontractor, as Ryan often made use of the services of the Angels' ace assassin, the hitman Yves "Apache" Trudeau.

In November 1979, Ryan was subpoenaed to testify at la Commission d'Enquête sur le Crime Organisé who wanted to know why Ryan-who was officially unemployed as he never had a legitimate job once in his life-could afford the mortgage on his house. Ryan testified that during his time in Boston in the 1960s that he had stolen some $100,000 in various bank robberies, which he had hidden somewhere, which was the source of his income. Through his claim was not believed, it was not possible for the commissioners to disprove it. According to police documents, it was believed that Ryan was worth up to $50 million. Ryan was said to have a briefcase with $500,000 in cash that he kept on his person.

Despite not having a job, Ryan was able to afford the services of Sidney Leithman, who was regarded as one of Montreal's best lawyers and was the preferred defense counsel for gangsters. Leithman successfully defended Ryan several times, and was rewarded with a golden Claddagh ring by Ryan.

By 1980, Ryan's base of operations was the bar of the Cavalier Motel on rue St. Jacques, where a collection of criminals would go to meet him at what was known as "the zoo". When another crime figure, Patrick "Hughie" McGurnaghan, cheated Ryan in a drug deal and carried a $100,000 debt, Ryan contacted the Hells Angels' North chapter for assistance. Hells Angels member Trudeau was dispatched to kill McGurnaghan. On 27 October 1981, Trudeau planted a car bomb on McGurnaghan's Mercedes-Benz, killing him and seriously injuring a male passenger.

Ryan refused advice to retire as he stated: "If your tap was flowing $100 bills, would you turn it off? I've got three hundred guys working for me. What are they gonna do?" By 1982, Ryan was known within the Montreal underworld as the "King of Coke". Ryan was a popular gang boss, who was well liked for his generosity towards his men with one of his followers, John Philips calling him a "honorable thief". Philips recalled that Ryan would "help anybody that came out of the can [prison] anytime! He'd say, 'Well, I'd see what I can for you. Here's five hundred bucks; go get yourselves some clothes and whatever the fuck you need'. Dunnie was like that. He was generous to a fault". Another West End Gang thief, Billy Morgan, called him "a very generous man" who was "very articulate" and "he never got mad. He was a perfect gentleman".

In January 1982, Ryan learned that two Hells Angels, Denis "Le Curé" Kennedy and Charles Hachey, were planning to kidnap Ryan's children to force him to forgive their drug debts. Ryan gave an ultimatum to Buteau that either the two would-be kidnappers be killed or else he would cease selling drugs to the biker club. Buteau dispatched Trudeau after the two, whom Trudeau executed after taking them out for drinks in a bar. In 1983, Ryan had become wealthy enough to purchase to a large house at 541 Montrose Drive in the wealthy neighborhood of Beaconsfield, where he lived with his wife and two children.

In 1983, Ryan sent McLaughlin, who proved to be very bloodthirsty as he enjoyed killing people, to a farm in New Brunswick owned by Noel Winters with orders to stay there until the media furor caused by his killings in Montreal ceased. Going with McLaughlin to New Brunswick was his girlfriend, Maria Kraus-Hillebrand. On 23 April 1984, the decomposing bodies of McLaughlin and Kraus-Hillebrand were found buried in a shallow grave in a rural area outside of Saint John. Based upon the state of decomposition, the police estimated that McLaughlin and Kraus-Hillebrand had been killed in late 1983, and charged Winters with the murders.

Winters believed that Ryan had sent McLaughlin to kill him over an unpaid drug debt, leading to him to strike first. Winters hanged himself in his cell the next day as he believed that Ryan would have him murdered in prison.

== Murder ==
Ryan was murdered on 13 November 1984. On the evening of his death, Ryan was at the Nittolo's Jardin Motel on St. Jacques Street West in Montreal when Paul April, a French-Canadian associate, told him there was an attractive young woman waiting to have sex with him in the adjoining room. April and his associate, Robert Lelièvre, who had a shotgun, planned to tie Ryan to a chair and force him to reveal where he had hidden his fortune before killing him.

Ryan resisted and threw a chair at Lelièvre, who opened fire with his shotgun. As Ryan lay dying on the floor, someone finished him off by shooting him in the head with a .45 handgun. It is unclear who actually shot Ryan. One of Ryan's killers, Eddie Philips, told his brother, John Philips "I shot a dead man!", claiming he had shot Ryan after his death on the orders of April and Lelièvre.

Ryan's killers fled so quickly that they did not take any of the valuables on his corpse. The police found in Ryan's wallet $6,350 in cash along with a gold chain still around his neck and a Rolex watch still on his wrist.

Four days later, Ryan's funeral was held at St. Augustine of Canterbury Church in Montreal, attended by his mother May, wife Evelyn, his two children, and another 200 mourners. Among those who attended the funeral were Allan "The Weasel" Ross and Laurent "L'anglais" Viau, Michel Blass and Yves Trudeau of the Hells Angels. The police observed that after the service had ended that Ross spent much time talking to Viau, the president of the Angels Laval chapter, to which both Blass and Trudeau belonged.

Ryan was replaced as boss of the West End Gang by Ross whose first act as leader was to hire the hitman Yves Trudeau of the Hells Angels' Laval chapter to hunt down and kill those responsible for the murder of Ryan. April and Lelièvre were killed in an apartment bombing less than two weeks later.

== Books ==
- Auger, Michel; Edwards, Peter (2012). The Encyclopedia of Canadian Organized Crime: From Captain Kidd to Mom Boucher. Toronto: McClelland & Stewart. ISBN 978-0771030499.
- O'Connor, D'Arcy (2011). Montreal's Irish Mafia: The True Story of the Infamous West End Gang. Toronto: John Wiley & Sons.
- Schneider, Stephen (2009). Iced: The Story of Organized Crime in Canada. Toronto: John Wiley & Sons. ISBN 978-0470835005..
