= Port of Montreal =

Port of Montreal Port de Montréal
- Interactive map of Port of Montreal; Port de Montréal

Location
- Country: Canada
- Location: Montreal, Quebec; Contrecœur, Quebec
- Coordinates: 45.547°N 73.530°W
- UN/LOCODE: CAMTR

Details
- Opened: Montreal Port Authority (1999); Montreal Port Corporation (1983); National Harbours Board (1936); Harbour Commission (1830)
- Operated by: Montreal Port Authority
- Owned by: Government of Canada
- Land area: 6.35 km^{2} (2.45 sq mi) (Montreal); 4.67 km^{2} (1.80 sq mi) (Contrecœur)
- No. of berths: 82
- Draft depth: 11 m (36 ft)
- Employees: 272
- Chairman: Nathalie Pilon
- President & CEO: Julie Gascon

Statistics
- Vessel arrivals: 2,028 (2024)
- Annual cargo tonnage: 35.41 million metric tons (2024)
- Annual container volume: 1.5 million TEUs (2024)
- Passenger traffic: 65,136 (2024)
- Annual revenue: C$143 million (2024)
- Net income: C$22.6 million (2024)
- Website www.port-montreal.com

The Port of Montreal (French: Port de Montréal, pronounced [pɔʁ də mɔ̃ʁeal]) (ACI Canadian Port Code: 0395, UN/LOCODE: CA MTR) is a cruise and transshipment point. It is located on the St. Lawrence River in Montreal, Québec, Canada. The port operates as an international container port. It services Quebec, Ontario, Toronto, the rest of Central Canada, the Midwestern United States, and the Northeastern United States. Though found on the Saint Lawrence Seaway, it is some 1,600 kilometres (990 mi) inland from the Atlantic Ocean and it is on the shortest direct route between the North American Midwest and Europe or the Mediterranean.

In 2024, more than 2,000 cargo ships visited with the port, while handling 35,410,000 metric tonnes of consumer goods, machinery, cereal, sugar, petroleum products, and other types of cargo. Montreal is also a port for cruise ships. The port is operated by the Montreal Port Authority. As of 2024 it is estimated the port's activities support an estimated 600,000 jobs directly and indirectly across Montreal and Quebec.

== History ==
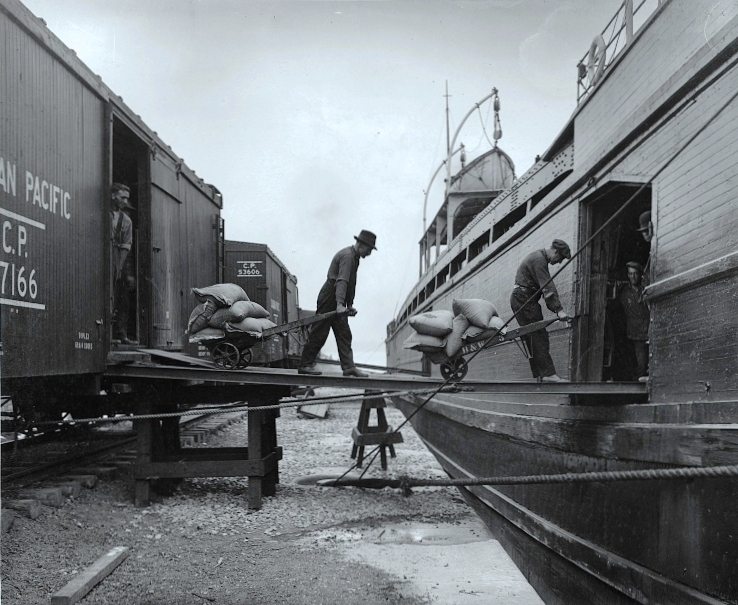
Loading sacks of grain on ship, about 1920

The port originated in the historic area now known as the Old Port of Montreal. Over the years, the Port of Montreal expanded eastward along the waterfront. In 1978, the Port of Montreal ceded the area now known as the Old Port to the Old Port of Montreal Corporation, a public corporation responsible for developing tourism and recreational activities in the area. The site is a tourist attraction, featuring museums, restaurants, shops and water-related activities. Most Port of Montreal facilities are located downstream from the Old Port. The Montreal Port Authority's head office and the multipurpose Bickerdike Terminal are located upstream from the Old Port.

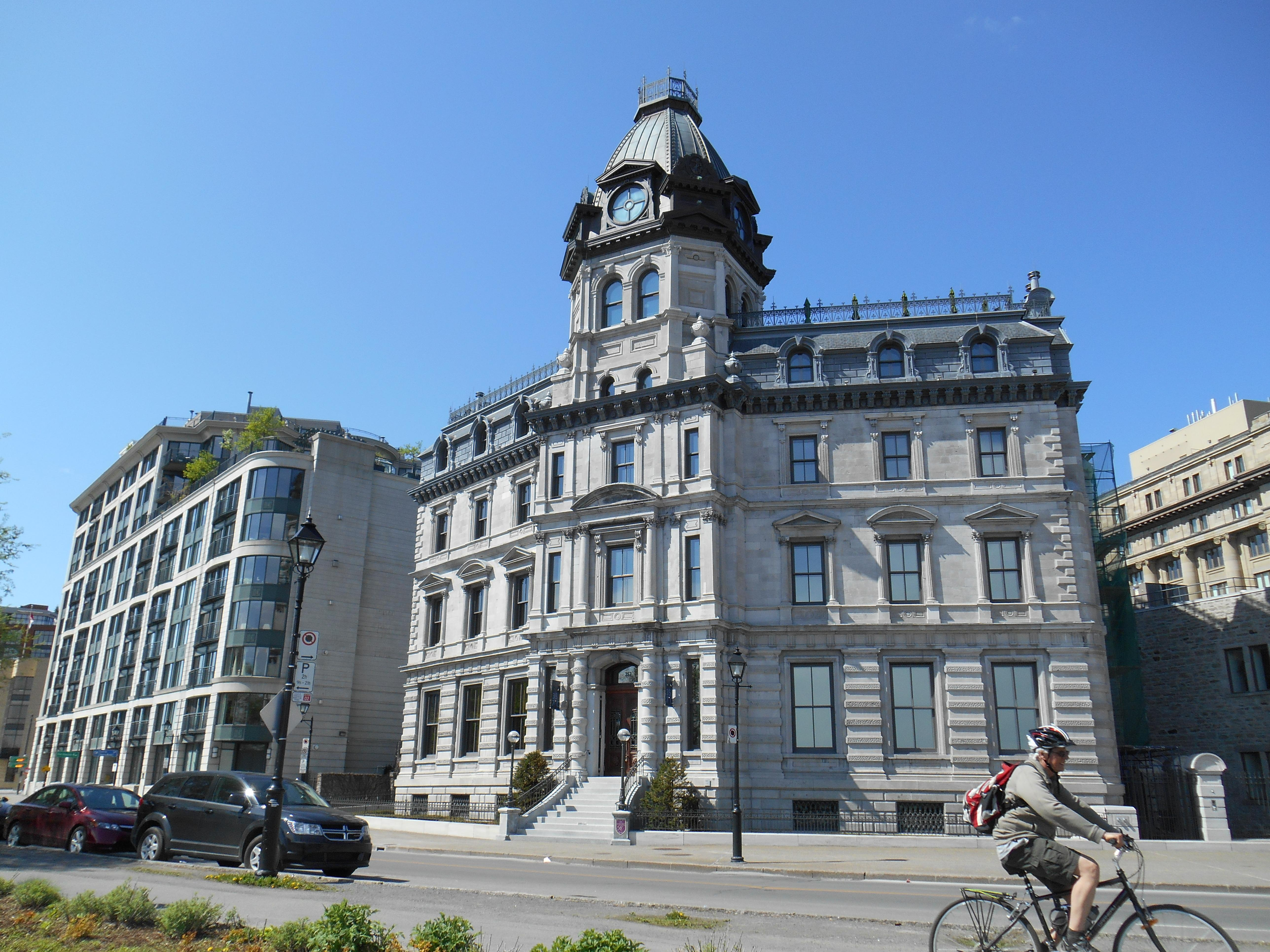
Historical building of the Harbour Commissioners of the Port of Montreal

=== Timeline ===
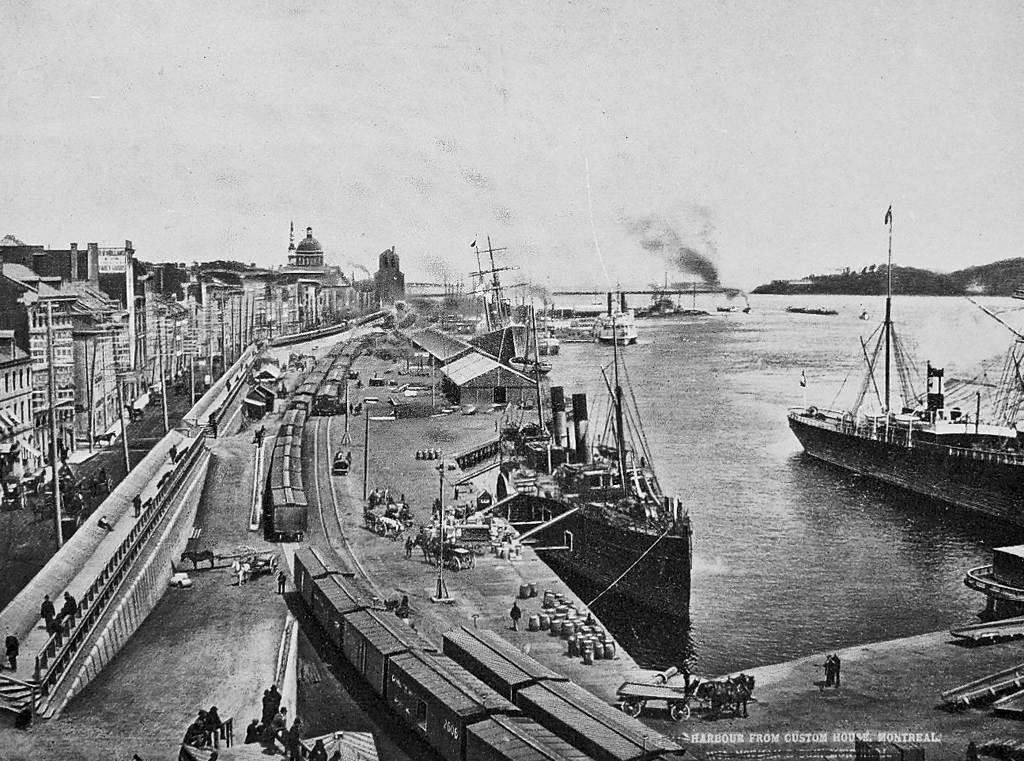
Old Port of Montreal circa 1899

Starting from the first authority:

- 1830: The first Harbour Commission is created. It built the first permanent wharves and pressed the government to dredge the river.
- 1830–1832: 1,143 metres (3,750 ft) of docks are built.
- 1840: The Gold-Headed Cane tradition begins, giving a cane to the captain of the first vessel to reach the port in the year.
- 1854: The navigation channel between Quebec City and Montreal is deepened to 4.88 metres (16.0 ft) and widened to 76.19 metres (250 ft).
- 1872: Archives for May 28 note that "there were 70 vessels—21 of them ocean-going steamships—docked at different berths, representing a total of 53,769 tonnes (59,270 short tons; 52,920 long tons)."
- 1883: Channel is dredged to 7.5 metres (25 ft).
- 1902: Start of construction of modern grain elevators in the port.
- 1908: First permanent transit sheds constructed.
- 1910: Project to deepen the channel to 10.7 metres (35 ft) began.
- 1936: The federal government creates the National Harbours Board.
- 1947: More than 25 steamship lines serve the port for seven and a half months of the year.
- 1962: The federal government decides to use icebreakers to keep the channel open between Montreal and Quebec City during winter.
- 1964: Year-round navigation begins in Montreal. In 1962, the Canadian Coast Guard began to use icebreakers to keep the St. Lawrence navigation channel open, first and foremost as an environmental measure designed to protect riverside communities from spring floods caused by ice jams. Year-round navigation to and from the port began in 1964.
- 1967: The port handles its first container.
- 1968: Canada's first container terminal is inaugurated in Montreal.
- 1972: Construction begins on Cast container terminal.
- 1977: The port handles its one-millionth TEU container.
- 1978: The port builds Racine container terminal and expands its operations in Montreal's east end.
- 1983: The Montreal Port Corporation is established.
- 1987: Maisonneuve container terminal (Termont) opens.
- 1992: Maximum draught is increased to 11 metres (36 ft).
- 1996: Three brand-new vessels, capable of carrying 2,300 TEU containers each, are christened in Montreal.
- 1998: Two shipping lines take delivery of three ships capable of transporting 2,800 TEU containers or the equivalent.
- 1999: Under the Canada Marine Act, the Montreal Port Corporation becomes the more autonomous Montreal Port Authority.
- 2000: The Port of Montreal handles more than 1 million TEU containers a year for the first time in its history.
- 2006: The port reaches a new milestone by handling more than 25 million tonnes of cargo.
- 2008: Electronic navigation system is implemented from Montreal to the mouth of the Gulf of St. Lawrence.
- 2011: The port opens a new common entry portal for trucks, transfers the management of its grain terminal operations to Viterra Inc., and reaches a new milestone by handling more than 28 million tonnes of cargo.
- 2018: The Port of Montreal inaugurates the Grand Quay, the renovated terminal for cruise ships.
- 2020: A series of labour disputes shut down the Port as part of the 2020 Port of Montreal strike.
- 2023: the Port of Montreal Tower is officially inaugurated.

== Economy ==
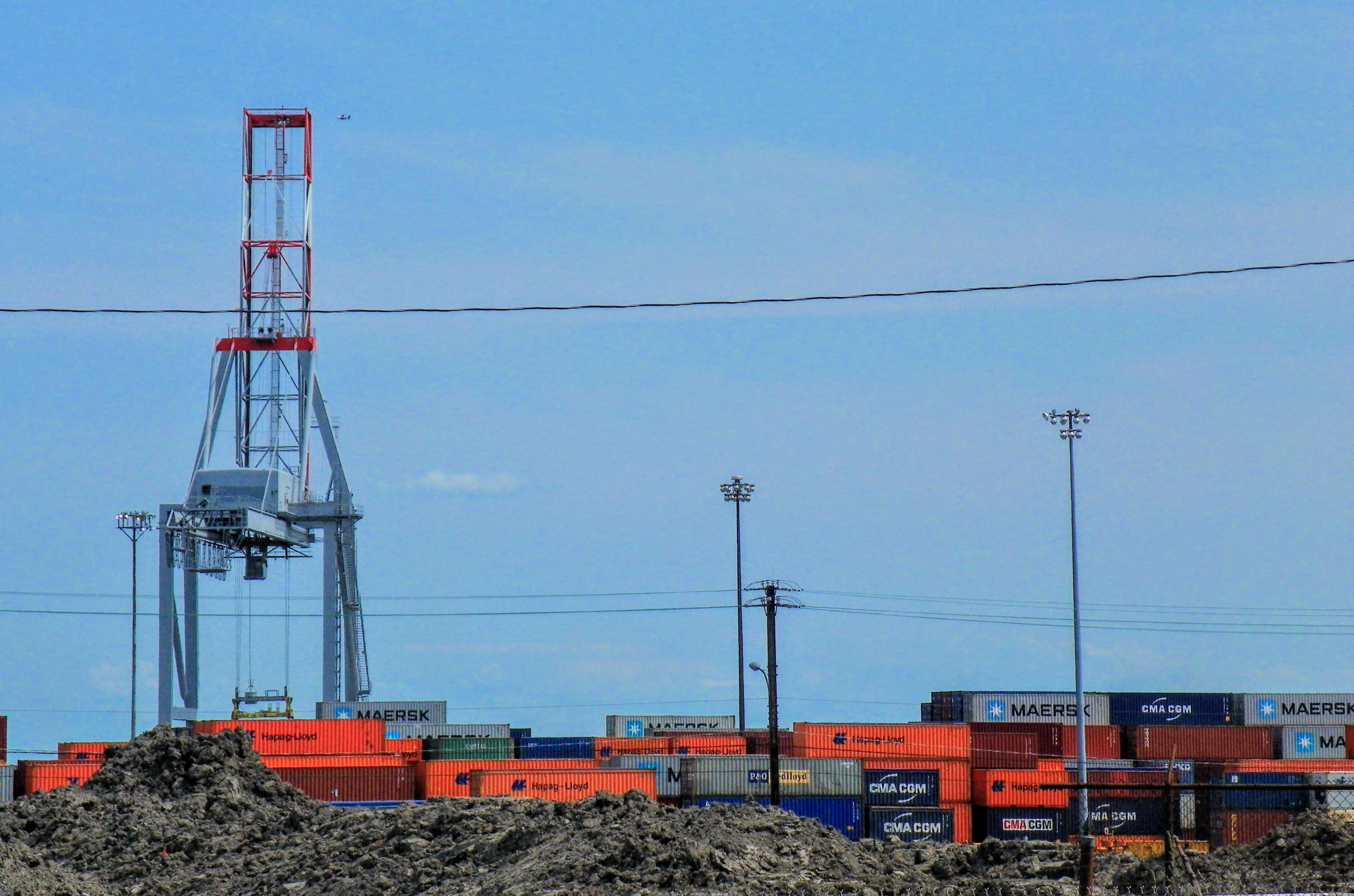
Crane and shipping containers in Racine Terminal in 2014

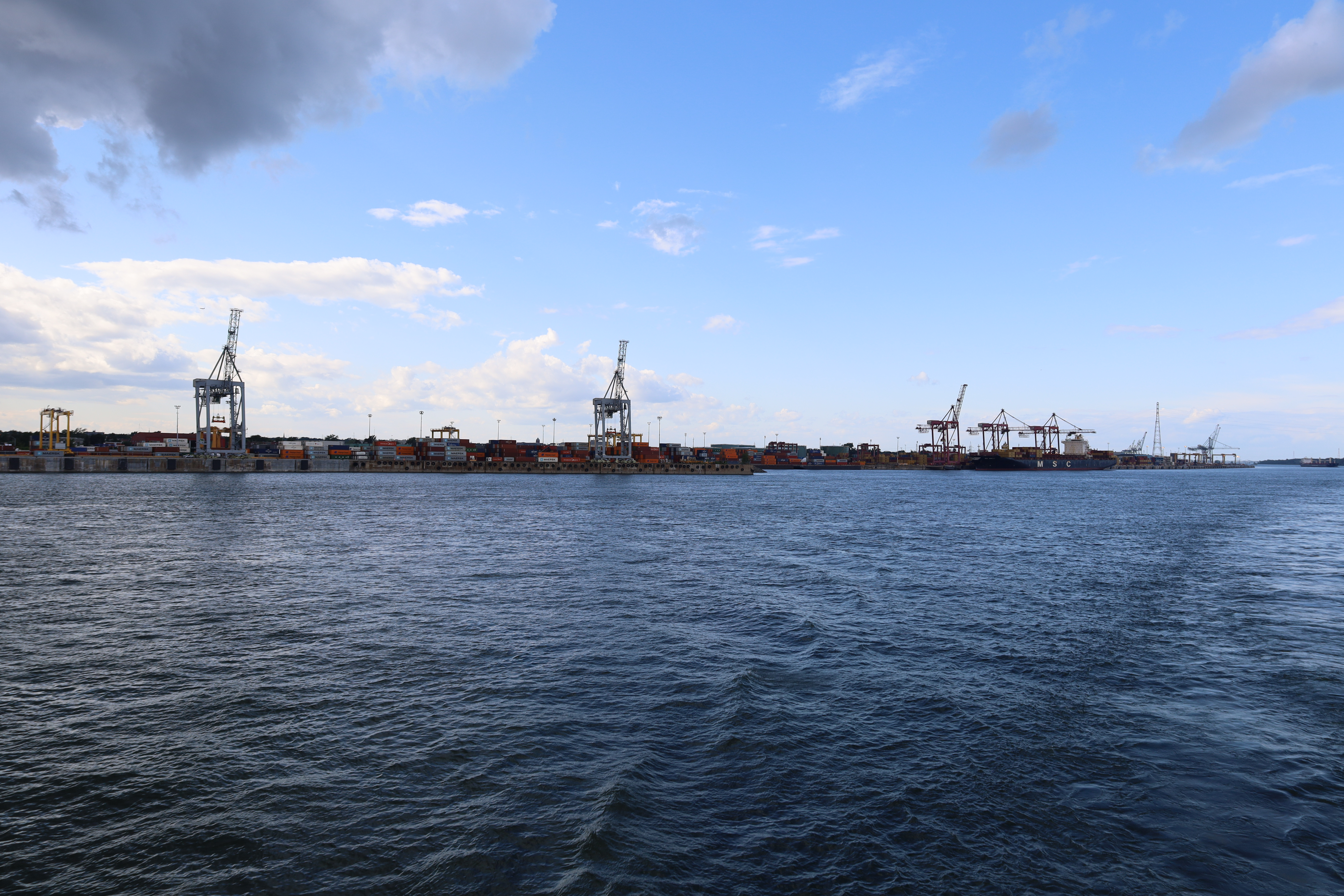
Cranes viewed from the river in 2023

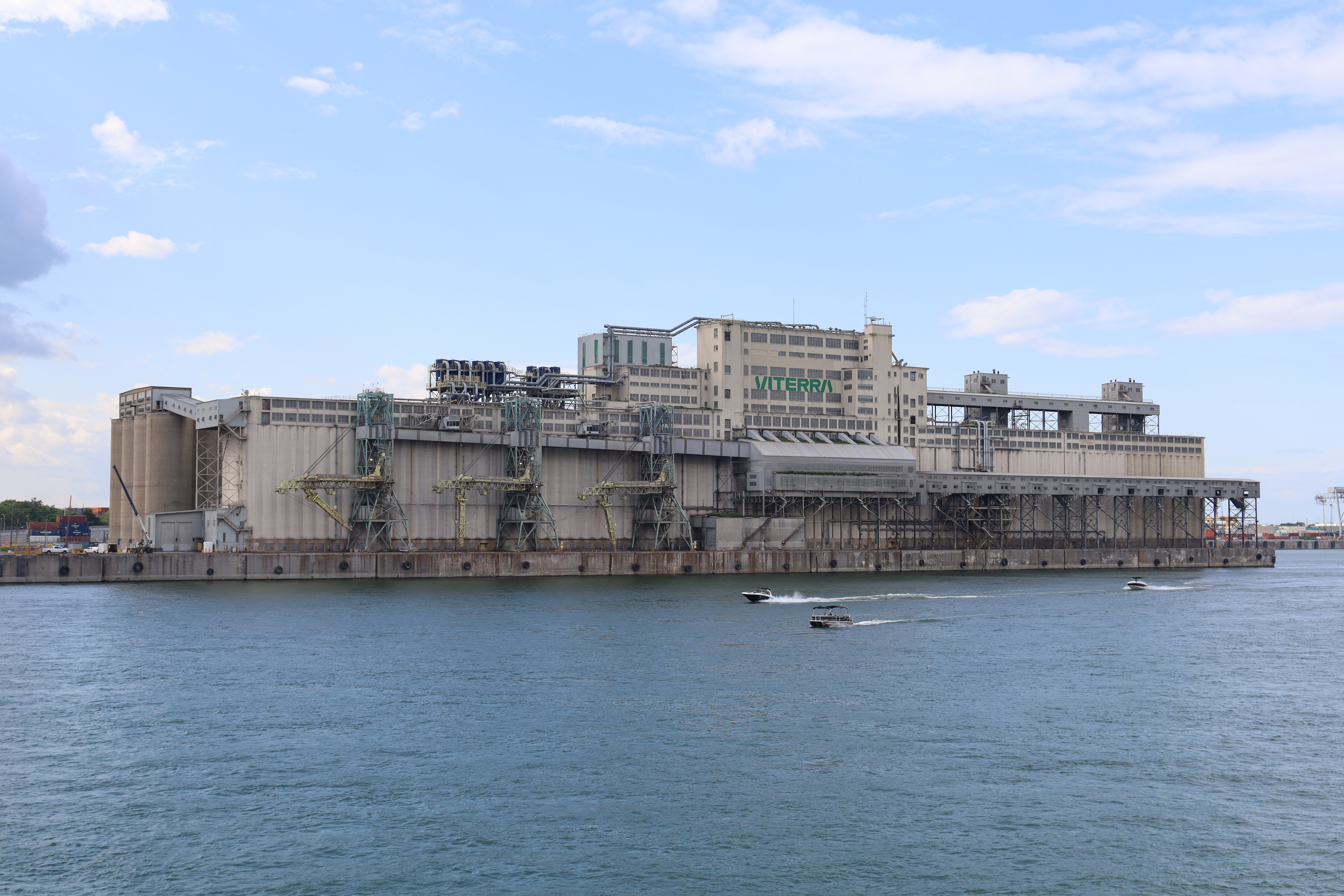
Viterra building at the port in 2023

Maritime and port activity in Montreal supports some 18,280 jobs and provides $1.5 billion in economic benefits to the Canadian economy (Secor study, 2008).

The Province of Québec announced in May 2013 the signature of a collaborative framework with the City of Montreal for the extension of a thoroughfare that was designed to link with port facilities. The province also announced the construction of an exit ramp from a major highway to allow trucks to directly reach the port, and the reconfiguration of an entrance ramp on the same highway to provide trucks leaving the port with direct access to the highway network. The two projects were designed to improve truck access at the Port of Montreal.

The Canada Infrastructure Bank announced $300 million in support of the Port of Montreal expansion project in Contrecoeur in 2018, and the Quebec government announced $55 million in financial assistance in 2021 and an additional $75 million in 2023.

The Port of Montreal was behind the creation of the Logistics and Transportation Metropolitan Cluster of Montreal, or Cargo Montreal, an initiative to help consolidate Montreal as a centre for goods transportation. The project is supported by the Metropolitan Community and its activities are financially supported by Québec's Finance and Economy Ministry, Executive Council Ministry, the Montreal Metropolitan Community and all Cargo Montreal members, while Transport Canada is a participant.

=== Markets ===
==== Export areas ====
The port serves a variety of North America markets. In 2024, 46% of the port's cargo traffic was destined for exportation, coming mainly from Québec (53%), Ontario (29%) and Western Canada (10%). The other 8% of containerized cargo traffic was destined for or came from the United States, mainly the Midwest.

The port has appointed representatives in the U.S., Europe and Asia to promote its advantages in those markets.

==== Import areas ====
In 2024, Northern Europe was the point of origin or final destination for 36% of the cargo moving through the port, followed by Asia (25%), the Mediterranean (22%), the Middle East (8%), Latin America (5%) and Africa/Oceania (4%). The port continues to benefit from traffic moving through the Suez Canal and the Panama Canal thanks to the direct services that shipping lines provide between Montreal and transhipment ports in the Mediterranean and the Caribbean.

== Port territory ==
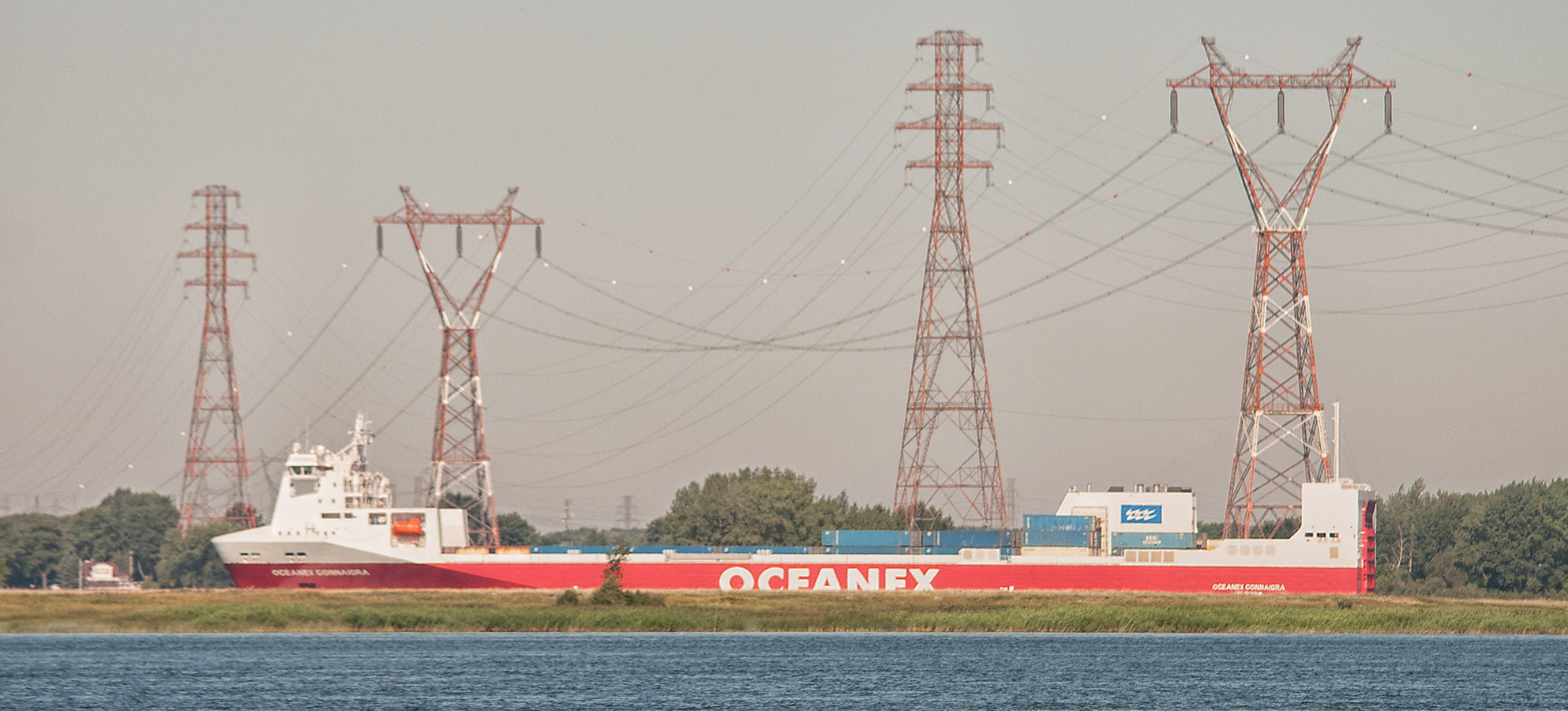
Ship passing under wires heading to the Port of Montreal

On the island of Montreal, port territory stretches along 26 kilometres (16 mi) of the waterfront from the Victoria Bridge at the upstream end of the port to Pointe-aux-Trembles at the downstream end of the port.

The port also has a terminal at Contrecoeur, on the south shore of the St. Lawrence River about 40 kilometres (25 mi) downstream from Montreal. The port owns land along four kilometres (2.5 mi) of the waterfront at Contrecoeur. This land was intended to be used to increase the port's container-handling capacity once its land on the island of Montreal reached full capacity.

=== Environment ===
The Port of Montreal is a founding member of Green Marine, a voluntary environmental program for the maritime industry in Canada and the United States. Green Marine addresses environmental issues such as greenhouse gases, cargo residues, conflict of use (noise, dust, odours, luminous pollution), water and soil pollution prevention, and environmental leadership. In Green Marine's most recent progress report, on a scale of 1 to 5, where Level 5 corresponds to the highest performance rating possible, the Port of Montreal scored Level 4 for efforts to reduce Air emissions and greenhouse gases, and Level 5 for Community impacts, Community relations, Environmental leadership, Spill prevention and stormwater management, and Waste management.

The Montreal Port Authority manages the Boucherville Islands Archipelago, which is located at the downstream end of the port. The port authority is completing work to provide fish with spawning areas at several islands of the archipelago as part of an agreement with the Fisheries and Oceans Canada Fish Habitat Management Branch. The Coastal Fisheries Protection Act calls for the creation or improvement of habitant banks as compensation for the impact of development projects, such as the development of berths, on the environment.

== Port infrastructure and characteristics ==
The Port of Montreal and the shipping channel between Montreal and Quebec City has a draft depth of 11.3 metres (37 ft) and is capable of handling neopanamax container ships of up to 6,700 TEUs.

=== Terminals ===
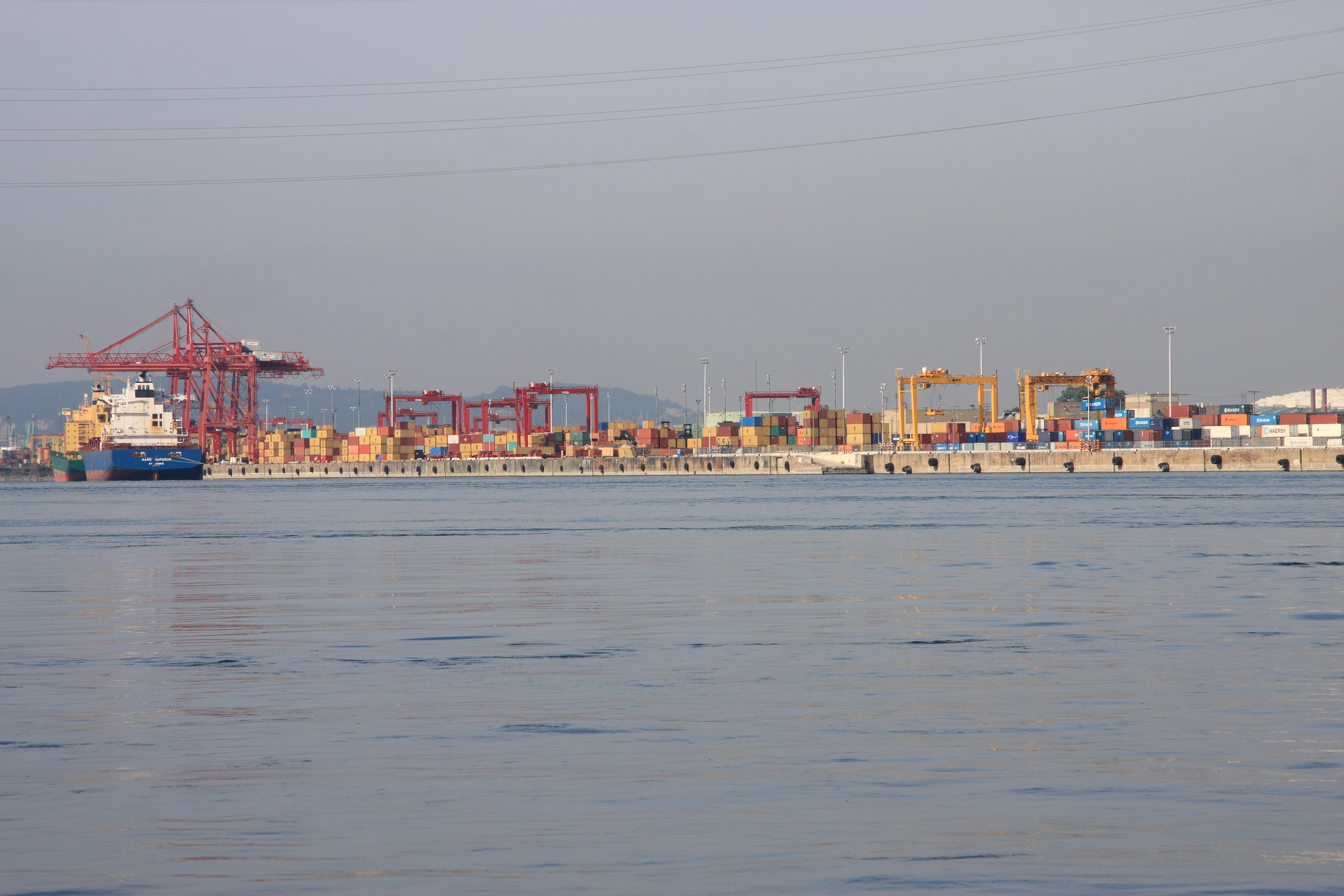
Port Montreal

==== Container ====
Container ships are completely unloaded and loaded. Container shipping lines calling the port include CMA CGM, Hapag-Lloyd, Maersk Line, Mediterranean Shipping Company and OOCL.

The port has five international container terminals. Montreal Gateway Terminals Partnership operates two of the terminals and Termont Montreal Inc. operates the others. QSL operates a terminal that handles domestic containers. These facilities cover an area of approximately 90 hectares (36 acres) and have 15 dockside gantry cranes with lifting capacities ranging from 40 to 65 tonnes, yard gantry cranes and other container-handling equipment.

==== Grain ====
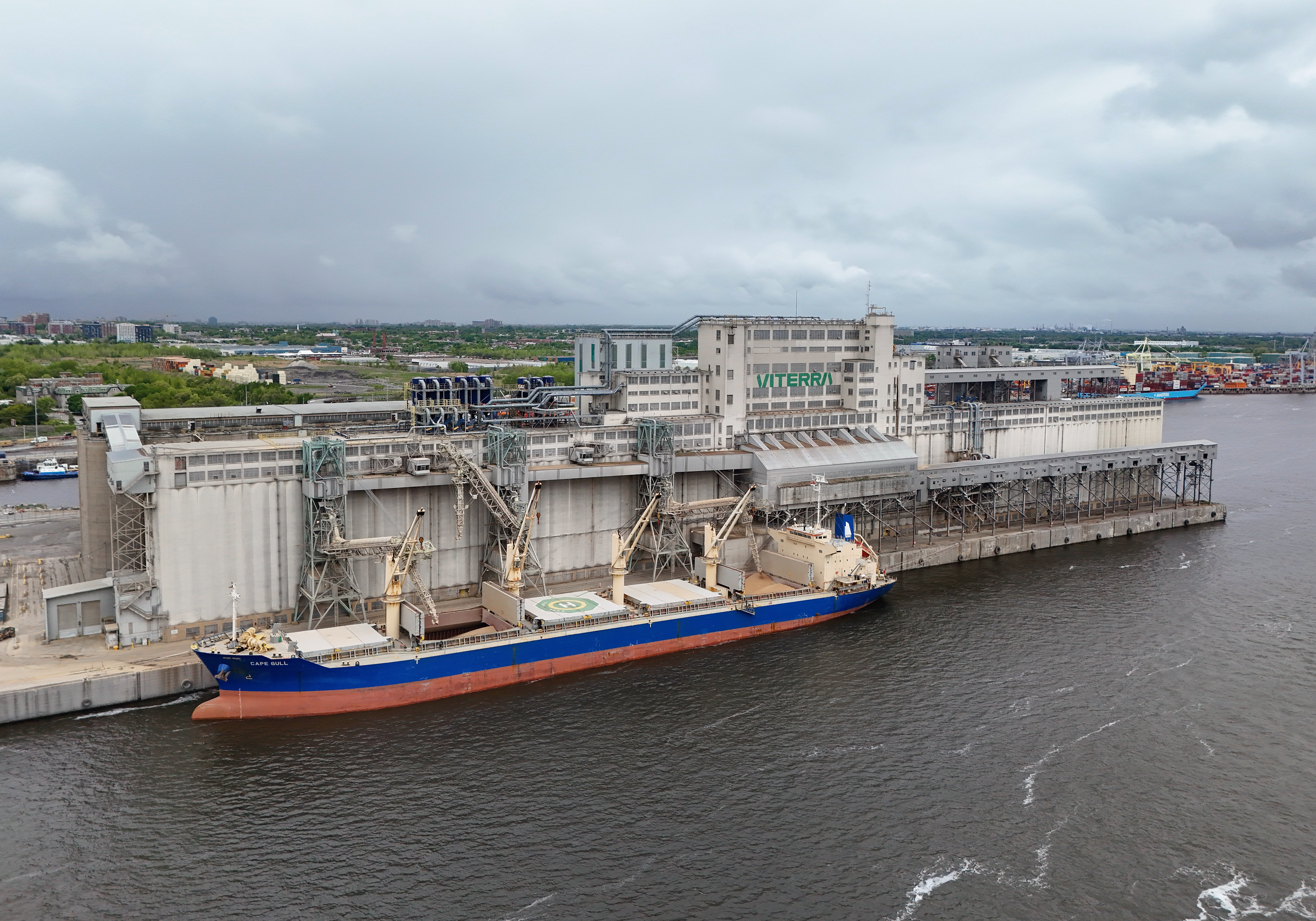
Viterra grain terminal

The port signed an agreement in 2011 with Viterra Inc., to lease and operate the port's grain terminal. Total grain traffic through the port reached 4,6 million tonnes in 2024. The grain terminal is a combined loading and unloading facility that has a total storage capacity of 260,000 tonnes.

==== Dry bulk (other than grain) ====
Iron ore, salt, fertilizers, copper ore, raw sugar and gypsum are among the major commodities handled. Logistec operates the port's dry bulk facilities.

==== Liquid bulk ====
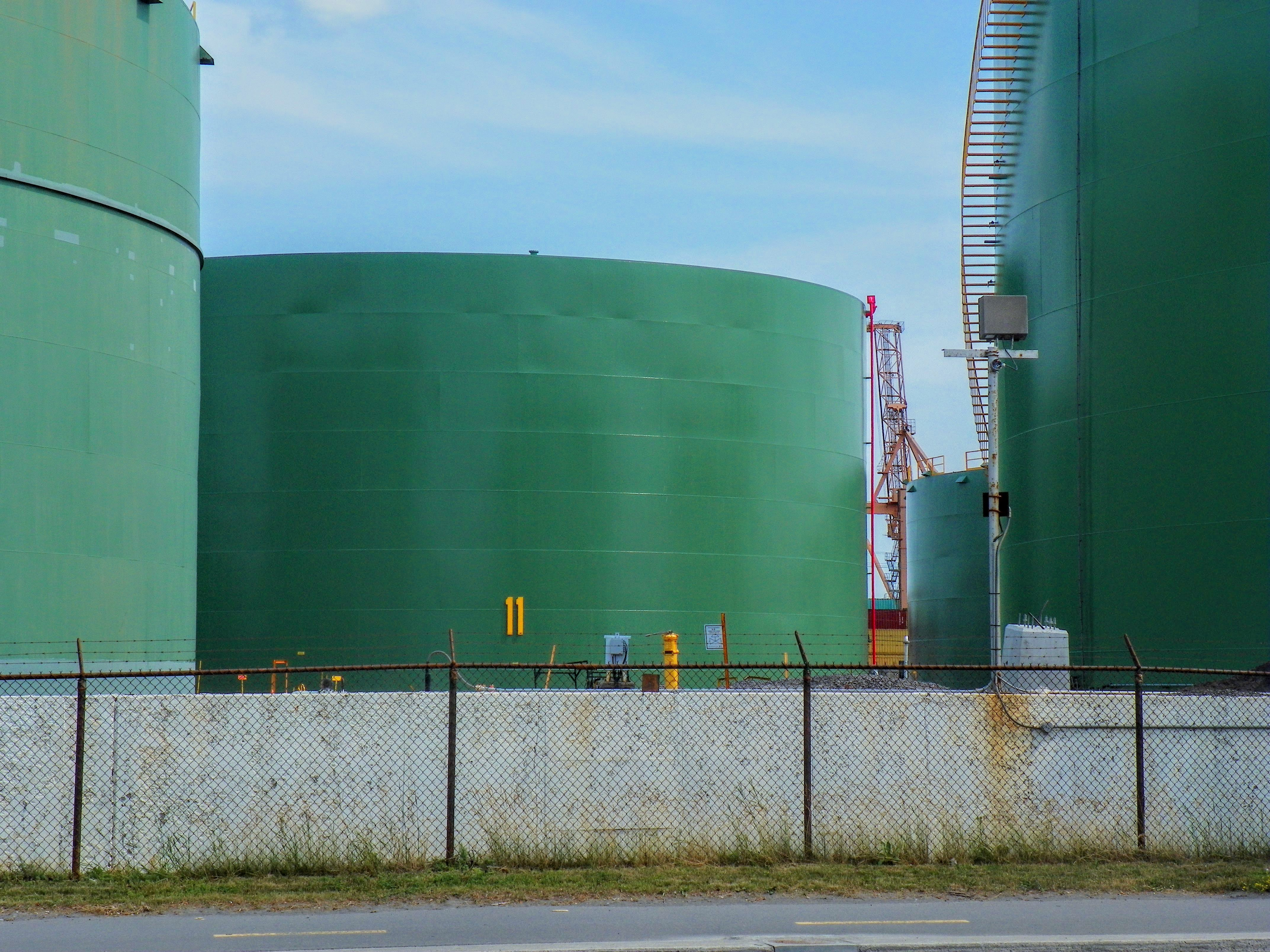
Tanks at the Norcan Oil Terminal

Six petroleum companies: Canterm Canadian Terminals Inc., Shell Canada Products, Suncor Energy, Terminal Montréal Est, Terminal Norcan Inc. and Ultramar Ltd. handle petroleum products at port facilities. Two companies Vopak Terminals Canada Inc. and Lallemand Inc. move other liquid bulk products.

==== Passenger cruise and leisure ====
The port authority directly operates a cruise passenger terminal, the Port of Montreal's Grand Quay. The port reported servicing 65,136 passengers and crew members in 2024.

== Transportation ==
The port authority provides facilities to shipping lines and land carriers, to terminal operators and to freight transport. It builds and maintains infrastructures that it leases to private stevedoring companies.

The port also has its own railway network, which includes more than 100 kilometres (62 mi) of track with direct access to almost every berth and further provides transcontinental railways through signed agreements with Canadian National Railway Co. (CN) and CPKC to improve supply chain efficiency for container traffic throughout North America.

== Management ==
The Montreal Port Authority operates the Port of Montreal and is a member of: the Association of Canadian Port Authorities (CPA), the American Association of Port Authorities, and the International Association of Ports and Harbors (IAPH). The port authority is an autonomous self-financing federal agency created under the terms of the Canada Marine Act.

The port authority's board of directors is composed of seven business people from the Montreal area. Each of three levels of government – federal, provincial and municipal – names a director. The federal transport minister, on the recommendation of port users, names the remaining four directors. The board elects its own chairman. As of 2024, the Port Authority had 272 employees, total revenue from operations was $143 million and its net earnings totalled $22.6 million.

== Smuggling ==
At the beginning of the 21st century, the port of Montreal was dominated by the West End Gang, which used it for drug smuggling. Over a 8 month period in 2000, the West End Gang smuggled in 260 kilograms of cocaine via the Port of Montreal. In 2001, the Liberal Senator Colin Kenny said of his visit to the port of Montreal that it reminded him of the 1954 film On The Waterfront. Kenny told the journalists Julian Sher and William Marsden: "We were looking at each other, wondering when Karl Malden was going to appear. It shocked the hell out of us". In 1997, the government of Jean Chretien disbanded the Canada Ports Police, which traditionally policed the waterfront and replaced the Ports Police with private security guards. Kenny and his Senate committee stated the unarmed and poorly paid private security guards who have no power of arrest were hapless in the face of the West End Gang. Kenny's committee discovered that 15% of the stevedores, 36% of the checkers and 56% of the garbagemen working at the port of Montreal had criminal records.

== International seaports agreements ==
- – Port of Antwerp, Belgium (2021)
- – Port of Marseille-Fos, France (2020)
- – Port of Tianjin, China
- – Mundra Port, Gujarat State, India (2018) Memorandum of Understanding (MOU)

== See also ==
- Board of Trade of Metropolitan Montreal
- Maritime Rescue Sub-Centre Quebec
- List of North American ports
- List of world's busiest container ports
- Container on barge

== Books ==
- Sher, Julian; Marsden, William (2003). The Road To Hell How the Biker Gangs Are Conquering Canada. Toronto: Alfred Knopf. ISBN 0-676-97598-4.
