= In Good Company =

In Good Company may refer to:

== Film and TV ==
- In Good Company (TV series), a Canadian television series hosted by Hana Gartner
- In Good Company (2000 film), a Greek film directed by Nikos Zapatinas
- In Good Company (2004 film), an American comedy-drama film written and directed by Paul Weitz

== Music ==
- In Good Company (Ted Brown album), 1985
- In Good Company (Joe Williams album), 1989
- In Good Company (Kevin Crawford album), 2001
- In Good Company (Canadian Chamber Choir album), 2010
- In Good Company (George Cables album), 2015

== See also ==
- Good Company (disambiguation)
