= Bibliography of the Front de libération du Québec =

Flag seen at demonstrations between 1968 and 1971 in Montreal and the U.S.

This is a Bibliography of the Front de libération du Québec.

The Front de libération du Québec (FLQ; English: Quebec Liberation Front) was a left-wing Québécois nationalist and Marxist–Leninist paramilitary group in Quebec, Canada. It was active between 1963 and 1970, and was regarded as a terrorist organization for its violent methods of action.

== In English ==
=== Militant writings ===
- Simard, Francis (1987). Talking it out : the October Crisis from inside. Montréal: Guernica. pp. 191 p. ISBN 0-919349-77-3. (translated by David Homel) online excerpt
- Vallières, Pierre (1977). The Assassination of Pierre Laporte. Toronto: J. Lorimer. pp. 192 p. ISBN 0-88862-136-1. (translated by Ralph Wells)
- Vallières, Pierre (1971). White Niggers of America. Toronto: McClelland and Stewart. pp. 278 p. ISBN 0-7710-8670-9. (translated by Joan Pinkham)

=== Works ===
- Tetley, William (2006). The October Crisis, 1970: An Insider's View. Montréal: McGill-Queen's University Press. pp. 310 p. ISBN 0-7735-3118-1.
- W. Kierans, Eric (2001). Remembering. Toronto: Stoddart Edition. ISBN 0-7737-3288-8.
- McLoughlin, Miachael (1998). Last stop, Paris: The Assassination of Mario Bachand and the Death of the FLQ. Toronto: Viking. pp. 320 p. ISBN 0-670-88196-1.
- Cléroux, Richard (1990). Official Secrets: The Story Behind the Canadian Security Intelligence Service (CSIS). Toronto: McGraw-Hill Ryerson. ISBN 0-07-551124-X.
- G. Loomis, Dan (1984). Not Much Glory: Quelling the F.L.Q. Toronto: Deneau. pp. 199 p. ISBN 0-88879-118-6.
- Fournier, Louis (1984). F.L.Q.: The Anatomy of an Underground Movement. Toronto: NC Press. pp. 373 p. ISBN 0-919601-91-X. (translated by Edward Baxter)
- Sawatsky, John (1980). Men in the Shadows. The RCMP Security Service. Doubleday Canada. pp. 302 p. ISBN 0-385-14682-5.
- Sallot, Jeff (1979). Nobody said No. Toronto: James Lorimer & Company Publishers. pp. 207 p. ISBN 0-88862-389-5.
- M. Regush, Nicholas (1973). Pierre Vallières: The Revolutionary Process in Quebec. Montreal: Fitzhenry and Whiteside. pp. 211 p.
- Hoggart, Ron; Aubrey Goldon (1971). Rumours of War. Toronto: New Press. pp. 320 p. ISBN 0-88862-243-0.

=== Criminology ===
- Whitaker, Reginald. "Apprehended Insurrection? RCMP Intelligence and the October Crisis". Queen's Quarterly. 100 (2 (Summer 1993)): 383–406.
- Crelinsten, Ronald. Limits to criminal justice in the control of insurgent political violence. A case study of the October Crisis in 1970, doctoral thesis, École de criminologie de l'Université de Montréal, 1985
- Wainstein, Eleanor Sullivan. The Cross and Laporte kidnappings, Montreal, October 1970 : a report prepared by Department of State and Defense Advanced Research Projects Agency, Santa Monica, California, Rand Corporation, 1977

=== Reports, Legal ===
- McDonald, David Cargill, Report of the Commission of Inquiry Concerning Certain Activities of the Royal Canadian Mounted Police, Ottawa, 1979-1981 (online)

=== Video ===
- The October Crisis: Civil Liberties Suspended, in CBC Archives, Canadian Broadcasting Corporation

== In French ==
=== FLQ documents ===
- La Cognée, 66 issues, from October 1963 to April 1967
- L'Avant-Garde, 5 issues, 1966
- La Victoire, from November 1967 to Summer 1968
- Pierre Vallières. Stratégie révolutionnaire et rôle de l'avant-garde, February 1969
- Charles Gagnon and Pierre Vallières. Pour un front commun multinational de libération, February 1970
- Pierre Vallières. La stratégie de la lutte armée, September 1971
- Partisans du Québec libre, single issue, by the Mouvement de libération des travailleurs du Québec, October 1970
- Délégation extérieure du FLQ, 6 issues, from Autumn 1970 to Autumn 1971
- Vaincre, 6 issues, from February to December 1971
- Organisons-nous, from October 1971 to September 1972

=== Militant writings ===
- Pierre Vallière. (1986) Les héritiers de Papineau. Itinéraire politique d'un «nègre blanc» (1960–1985), Montréal: Éditions Québec-Amérique
- Francis Simard. (1982) Pour en finir avec Octobre, Montréal: Éditions Stanké
- François Schirm. (1982) Personne ne voudra savoir ton nom, Montréal: Éditions Quinze
- Louise Lanctôt. (1981) Une sorcière comme les autres, Montréal: Éditions Québec-Amérique
- Jacques Lanctôt. (1979) Rupture de ban. Paroles d'exil et d'amour, Montréal: VLB éditeur
- Gabriel Hudon. (1977) Ce n'était qu'un début ou La petite histoire des premiers pas du FLQ, Montréal: Éditions Parti Pris
- Pierre Vallière. (1977) L'Exécution de Pierre Laporte. Les dessous de l'opération, Montréal: Éditions Québec/Amérique, 223 pages
- Jacques Lanctôt. (1975) La seule voie de la révolution au Québec, unpublished
- Pierre Vallière. (1972) L'urgence de choisir, Montréal: Éditions Parti Pris
- Pierre Vallière. (1968) Nègres blancs d'Amérique, Montréal: Éditions Parti Pris

=== Works ===
- Éric Bédard. (1998) Chronique d'une insurrection appréhendée. La Crise d'octobre et le milieu universitaire, Sillery: Septentrion (online excerpt)
- Normand Lester. (1998 ) Enquêtes sur les services secrets, Montréal: Éditions de l'Homme
- Léon Dion. (1998) La Révolution dérouté 1960-1976, Montréal: Boréal, 321 pages
- Louis Fournier. (1998) FLQ : Histoire d'un mouvement clandestin, Outremont: Lanctôt, 533 pages
- Bernard Dagenais. (1990) La crise d'octobre et les médias : le miroir à dix faces, Outremont: VLB éditeur, 217 p.
- Fernand Dumont. (1971) La Vigile du Quebec. Octobre 1970: l'impasse?, Outremont: Hurtubise HMH, 234 pages
- Marc Laurendeau. (1990) Les Québécois violents, Montréal: Éditions du Boréal
- Robert Comeau (dir) (1990) FLQ : un projet révolutionnaire. Lettres et écrits felquistes (1963–1982), Outremont: VLB, 275 pages
- Jean-François Cardin. (1990) Comprendre Octobre 1970. Le FLQ, la crise et le syndicalisme, Montréal: Méridien
- Germain Dion. (1985) Une Tornade de 60 jours: la crise d'octobre à la Chambre des communes, Hull, Éditions Asticou, 222 pages.
- De Vault, Carole (1982). The Informer: Confessions of an Ex-Terrorist, Toronto: Fleet Books, 282 p. (ISBN 0770600018) [translated by William Johnson]
- Luc Gosselin and Georges Paradis. (1980) État et violence: le terrorisme politique, une méthode d'opposition et d'affrontement, analysis essay, unpublished
- Louis Fournier. (1978) La police secrète au Québec, Montréal: Éditions Québec-Amérique
- Jean Paré. (1977) Le temps des otages (Le Québec entre parenthèses) 1970-1976, Montréal: Éditions Quinze, 269 pages.
- Jean Provencher. (1974) La grande peur d'octobre 70, Montréal: Éditions de l'Aurore, 123 pages.
- Jacques Lacoursière. (1972) Alarme citoyens!, Montréal: Éditions La Presse
- Gérard Pelletier. (1971) La crise d'octobre, Montréal: Éditions du jour, 268 pages.
- Ron Hoggart and Aubrey Goldon. (1971) Octobre 1970 un an après, Éditions Hurtubise-HMH (translation of Rumours of War)
- Dr Serge Mongeau. (1970) Kidnappé par la police, Montréal: Éditions du Jour
- Joseph Costisella. (1965) Peuple de la nuit. Histoire des Québécois, Éditions Chénier, 126 pages
- Claude Savoie. (1963) La véritable histoire du FLQ, Montréal: Éditions du Jour

=== Reports, Legal ===
- Jean-François Duchaîne. Report on the Events of October 1970, Direction générale des publications gouvernementales, Québec, 1981. 256 p.
- Jean Keable. Rapport de la Commission d'enquête sur des opérations policières en territoire québécois, Direction des communications, Ministère de la justice, 1981, 451 pages

=== Newspapers, journals ===
- Michel Gourd. "Quand l’arbitraire policier s’impose au Canada", in Le Monde diplomatique, February 2005
- Pierre Duchesne. "René Lévesque a-t-il su, avant 1981, que son ministre Claude Morin collaborait avec la GRC? - L'histoire s'écrit lentement...", in Le Devoir, May 4, 2000
- Andrée Ferretti. "From London to Ottawa, State terrorism in the history of Quebec", in L'Action nationale, volume 90, Issue 8 (October 2000) pp. 67–79
- "Octobre 1970 : dix ans après", in Criminologie, Volume 13, Issue 2 (1980)

=== Audio-Video ===
- Guerre secrète contre l'indépendance du Québec, documentary series Missions secrètes, 5 episodes broadcast on September 18, 2001 at Canal D, produced by Sophie Deschênes of Sovimage, script by Gilles Desjardins (online)
- Francis Simard and Jean-Daniel Lafond. La liberté en colère, video documentary, 1994
- Octobre 70 : le Québec en crise, dossier containing 8 clips in Les Archives de Radio-Canada, Société Radio-Canada
- L'espionnage au Canada décodé, dossier containing 10 clips in Les Archives de Radio-Canada, Société Radio-Canada
- Pierre Vallières retrouve la liberté, in Les Archives de Radio-Canada, Société Radio-Canada (broadcast on January 25, Format 30, 27 min 09 s)
- Médiateur de la crise d'Octobre, in Les Archives de Radio-Canada, Société Radio-Canada
- « La liberté en colère » in Les Archives de Radio-Canada, Société Radio-Canada (broadcast on November 30, 1994, 3 min 06 s)
- Pour un Québec socialiste, in Les Archives de Radio-Canada, Société Radio-Canada (broadcast November 24, 1972, 15 min 05 s)
- FLQ : Ni messie, ni Robin des Bois, dans Les Archives de Radio-Canada, Société Radio-Canada (broadcast October 8, 1970, 11 min 27 s)
