= Daniel Burke (music promoter) =

Canadian journalist (born 1957)

Daniel Burke (born 1957) is a Canadian journalist and music promoter.

== Journalist ==
Burke was born into a working-class Irish Catholic family in the Notre-Dame-de-Grâce district of Montreal, where he grew up. As a teenager, he began working as a copyboy for the Montreal Gazette, the city's main English-language newspaper, where his father, Timothy, worked as a sports writer. During his youth, he became acquainted with many members of the West End Gang.

In 2011, Burke recalled seeing Frank "Dunnie" Ryan, Allan "the Weasel" Ross, and other West End Gang members playing pool at Smitty's Bar, describing it as "like a scene out of Goodfellas. That's what it was like."

Neil Cameron, a journalist at the Montreal Gazette, stated, "Dan could be described—like many baby boomers who longed to be part of a world known by their fathers, a world dying out in their own time—as a man born too late. Both Tim [Burke] and Dan struck me as being romantically Irish: pugnacious, hard-drinking, sentimental, and rather fond of the more disreputable elements of Montreal."

Burke graduated from Loyola High School in 1974.

After working at the Edmonton Sun, Burke enrolled at Ryerson Polytechnical Institute (now Toronto Metropolitan University) in 1978, aiming to major in journalism. One former girlfriend at Ryerson described him as follows: "Dan was hot. He was very funny, had a slight lisp, and was also a bit of a brawler. I seem to remember he had a summer job working on a ship in the Great Lakes, and he’d talk about getting into fights. It was almost like he was from another generation."

In the early 1980s, Burke dropped out of Ryerson and began working as a journalist with the Toronto Star.

Burke had the ability to write well and to ingratiate himself with criminal elements, which made him a successful crime journalist. One journalist, Wilson-Smith, said of Burke: "Some cop writers work it from the police angle. Dan came at it from the other side. He was very comfortable with the thugs."

Unhappy with life in Toronto, Burke returned to his native Montreal later in the 1980s. In 1987, he published a story in Maclean's magazine that revealed gross corruption in the office of the Minister of Public Works, Roch LaSalle. His article led to LaSalle's resignation from the cabinet.

In 1987, Burke's profile of Ryan, entitled "An Uncommon Criminal," in Saturday Night magazine led to his nomination for a National Magazine Award for investigative journalism. Burke did not win the award, and at the ceremony, he was intoxicated and became involved in a brawl with rival journalist Gare Joyce.

During this period, many of Burke's friends, such as journalist John Haslett Cuff, expressed concern about his lifestyle. Cuff stated, "Burke got into some really bad drugs. I remember when he was doing work for Maclean’s, he’d call me up in the day, not about a story he was working on, but because he was high at his desk and thought it was funny... We were all concerned about his drug use. But the intervention failed. I myself had only just quit drinking, and it only got worse for Danny."

Burke started working for The Fifth Estate television show in 1991. By this time, Burke was, by his own admission, addicted to cocaine, and as a drug addict, he knew many of Montreal's drug dealers very well. From a West End Gang drug dealer, Burke learned that Claude Savoie, a senior officer with the Royal Canadian Mounted Police, was working for Allan "the Weasel" Ross of the West End Gang.

Burke stated in a 2008 interview, "I was on drugs then and I was fucked... I found out about it from one of the drug traffickers I knew. Savoie was corrupt. He was taking money from one of the biggest drug traffickers in Canada." Burke produced and researched an episode that exposed the shady links between Savoie, Ross, and a well-known Montreal lawyer, Sidney Leithman, who had been murdered in 1991. Together with Hana Gartner and Julian Sher, who also worked on the story, Burke exposed Savoie as corrupt.

In an interview with Burke, Savoie came close to admitting his guilt, stating, "I know with Allan Ross, there's no doubt that was word always, you know, that he had access to somebody, and you know, maybe he did... And I gather from you wanting to talk to me that you feel maybe I was one of those people on the list, and that's fair game I guess... Sometimes people make mistakes. What can I tell you?"

The revelation of his corruption prompted Savoie to commit suicide in his office at the RCMP's national headquarters in Ottawa on 21 December 1992.

Savoie's suicide caused some controversy, with many charging that The Fifth Estate bore some responsibility for his death by publicly exposing him as corrupt. Both Sher and Gartner have expressed feelings of guilt, with Sher saying in 2010, "All I could think was that his kids would never have another Christmas with their father. But I have to remind myself that I’m not the one who accepted the bribes."

In 2022, Sher stated, “I didn't kill him, I didn't load the gun, I didn't put the gun to his head. He made his choices. I'm not responsible, but if Dan [Burke] and I had decided not to do the story, if we had not covered this stuff, would he be alive? He might have decided to kill himself when the RCMP investigated him... The lesson I learned from that is the consequences of our work. For many of the people we tell stories about, it's their lives and sometimes their deaths."

Burke, by contrast, has expressed no guilt over Savoie's suicide, saying in 2008, "For all I know, it may have been a choice his colleagues forced him to make because they didn't want him to reveal further corruption. I don't know. All I know is that I didn't feel fucking bad about it." In 2011, Burke stated, "People ask me if I felt bad. Fuck no. That was the game. He was a dirty cop, and I nabbed him."

The Savoie scandal led to Burke being promoted to associate producer with The Fifth Estate, but his substance abuse led him to engage in erratic behavior that troubled many. By 1993, many of his colleagues at The Fifth Estate were pressing him to go into rehab, advice that he rejected. Linden MacIntyre, a journalist with The Fifth Estate, stated in a 2011 interview, "He'd say things like, ‘I want to live the life rather than talk about it.' For a long time, I thought he was just researching something, working on a novel, but he was just out of control, trying to give it a romantic gloss."

In December 1994, Burke walked out of The Fifth Estate office, never to return, marking the end of his journalism career. Bob Culbert, the executive director of CBC's news and current affairs, called Burke in for a meeting. MacIntyre recalled, "Bobby called Dan in and said he'd help him; that the CBC would do whatever it takes to get him back on track. Burke listened, and then said he didn't want to be back on his feet, and asked Bobby for a twenty-dollar loan."

== Homeless ==
From 1995 to 1997, Burke lived as a homeless person in Toronto. MacIntyre stated, "Dan became a character in his own life. I think he knew this, and it brought him comfort. He never looked down on people who were down and out. And so now he could look at them and say, ‘I'm one of those people, too. So be it.’"

Cuff, who tried to help him, recalled, "We hired him because of his research skills, but he just got high and messed up. I was cruising crack houses in Regent Park, looking for Danny and the rental car we'd given him."

== Music booker ==
In April 1997, Burke entered the music business almost by chance. He was able to leverage himself into becoming a music promoter by convincing a landlord, who owned a decaying building, that he could turn it into a nightclub, despite lying about knowing much about the music industry. In the spring of 1997, Burke began intensely researching various emerging music acts in Toronto, saying, "I'd read through the weeklies, get a feel for the story, and then try to set something up."

On 1 July 1997, Club Shanghai opened in Toronto, with Burke as its chief booking agent. Initially a failure, Club Shanghai had become Toronto's most popular club by 1998, hosting acts such as the White Stripes, the Brian Jonestown Massacre, Sloan, and the Deadly Snakes, all of which played to well-received shows. After quarreling with the owners of Club Shanghai, Burke left in the middle of 1998 to become the booker for El Mocambo club.

After leaving Club Shanghai, Burke recalled, "I'd gotten about $2,300 of a $5,000 settlement I was supposed to get, and I spent the whole fucking thing in about four days."

Burke recalled, “I got to the El Mo with $60 in my pocket, no job, and no home. Somehow I ended up booking the whole club, so I must have done something right.” The new owners of El Mocambo, Lamin Dibba and Ken Eng, wanted to revive the decaying venue and felt that Burke was the right person to facilitate the revival, based on his success with Club Shanghai.

Journalist Andrew Scott wrote in 2003, "...Burke was the visionary for, and gatekeeper of, the El Mocambo," though he also noted, "Burke's disdain of commercialism was good for street credibility, but bad for business." Clint Rogerson, a Toronto musician, recalled, "You'd see him on a payphone, booking some band from Memphis that nobody in Toronto had even heard of. The Black Lips, Brian Jonestown Massacre—Dan was the first to make that shit happen."

Burke's success at El Mocambo was largely due to his ability to discover rising new American bands, which he booked to play at the club just before they achieved mainstream popularity. At the same time, the bands Burke booked were perceived as having "authenticity," with the belief that they were playing music out of love for the art rather than for financial gain.

Burke's success as a booker made him a local celebrity in Toronto. Rogerson recalled, "There's been a lot of shows where nobody’s having a better time than Dan. He'd get a couple drink tickets that were supposed to be for the bands, and he'd be at the bar: Scotch. Scotch. Scotch. And then suddenly there’d be an altercation or misunderstanding that would escalate into a brouhaha."

His success as the booker for El Mocambo provided Burke with the first stability in his life for years, as he was able to hold the job. Burke considers the summer of 2001 one of the highpoints of his life, as he had a steady girlfriend and an apartment for the first time in years. However, the ownership of El Mocambo changed hands in 2001, with local businessman Abbas Jahangiri becoming the new owner.

In September 2001, Jahangiri decided to shut down El Mocambo, leading to a final show on 4 November 2001, which ended with Burke being arrested for alleged assault after he threw his sunglasses at Jahangiri. Burke attempted to reopen El Mocambo at another location, but the city of Toronto blocked his move by denying him a license to sell alcohol, rendering his plans moot. Without a job, Burke lost both his girlfriend and his apartment.

After six months of unemployment, by May 2002, Burke had lost the $18,000 he had saved from his time as the booker for El Mocambo, leading him to live on the streets again.

Burke lived on the margins of Toronto society while continuing to work as a booker. His most consistent job was as the booker for The Silver Dollar club, starting in early 2003.

During one show on 13 April 2004, Burke was involved in a brawl with musician John Dwyer of The Hospitals on stage, which ended with a guitar being smashed over his head. Burke regards this on-stage brawl with The Hospitals as one of the highlights of his music career. He told journalist Cathal Kelly, "It was so rude, what they did," charging that The Hospitals had been late to the show and were treating the Toronto audience poorly, which led him to confront them on stage.

Burke is considered by many to be one of Toronto's best music bookers, albeit an unstable figure with serious substance abuse issues. In 2008, journalist Jordan Bimm wrote:

"Booking and promoting live shows for The Silver Dollar at College and Spadina, Burke has become something of a living legend. Still struggling with addiction, Burke lives an unpredictable day-to-day existence—his name having become synonymous with crack-cocaine, erratic behaviour and street-level hustling, but also with indie celebrity, and some of the most memorable rock shows Toronto has ever seen. In a word, Dan Burke is an anomaly. Blessed with moxie, wit, and intellect, Burke has the skills and musical taste to be a big-time booker. At the same time, his absolutely heroic intake of drugs, transient life-style, and subsequent inability to control his finances virtually guarantees him a life of marginalized vagrancy. Somehow, every day, Burke manages to navigate this near-impossible tightrope between success and total self-destruction. He’s become an unlikely yet fascinating cultural icon".

Bimm described Burke as one of the most important music bookers in Toronto, noting his significant contributions to revitalizing the music scene on College Street since 1997.

Despite suffering a major heroin overdose during a visit to Manchester, Burke told Bimm that he had no interest in pursuing rehab for his substance abuse. For many years, Burke's "office" was an internet café on College Street, where he used the internet to research rising music acts. He ran up a $600 tab in unpaid internet usage, which he paid off gradually over time.

A colourful character, Burke was described by Kelly in 2009 as follows: "He is feckless and untrustworthy and an admitted thief. But he is a purist who lives harder than any of the acts he has helped thrust toward stardom. And that makes him untouchable."

Burke admitted to Kelly that he continued to struggle with substance abuse and was homeless. Kelly described Burke as an unnaturally fit man for his age, with the build of a boxer, who was deeply passionate about music and maintained an intense work ethic.

Despite having lived in Toronto for decades, Burke still regards his hometown of Montreal as his favorite city. He sees himself in a "Joycean" exile, comparing himself to Irish writer James Joyce. Burke explained that, just as Joyce lived away from his beloved Dublin to preserve perfect memories of the city, he remains away from Montreal to keep his memories of his hometown unsullied by current realities.

The journalist Jay Somerset, who met Burke in December 2010, described him as an oddity: one of Toronto's most successful music bookers with an annual income of about $40,000, yet homeless. Burke lived either in his office at the Velvet Underground bar or at the Oak Leaf men’s bathhouse. Burke told Somerset: "I’m a drug addict and an alcoholic with about twelve years left—twelve years of work—and I’m about to reinvent myself."

Burke's unconventional lifestyle inspired the 2011 documentary The Last Music Man as well as the song "Show Promoter Dan" by The Barmitzvah Brothers.

In 2017, journalist Sarah Greene reported that Burke appeared to have overcome many of his drug addiction issues, with his principal vice at the time being cigarettes.

In 2022, Burke played a prominent role as an expert in the documentary Kings of Coke, which focused on the West End Gang and the Savoie scandal. A significant portion of the documentary dealt with the still-unsolved 1991 murder of Sidney Leithman.

== Books ==
- O'Connor, D'Arcy (2011). Montreal's Irish Mafia: The True Story of the Infamous West End Gang. Toronto: John Wiley & Sons.
- Schneider, Stephen (2009). Iced: The Story of Organized Crime in Canada. Toronto: John Wiley & Sons. ISBN 978-0470835005..
