= Claude Savoie (policeman) =

Canadian police officer (1943–1992)

- Savoie in a 1992 episode of The Fifth Estate
- Born: Joseph Philippe Claude Savoie; 1943; Montreal, Quebec, Canada
- Died: 21 December 1992 (aged 49); Ottawa, Ontario, Canada
- Cause of death: Suicide by gunshot
- Police career
- Department: Royal Canadian Mounted Police; Criminal Intelligence Service
- Service years: 1965–1992
- Rank: Inspector

Joseph Philippe Claude Savoie (1943 – 21 December 1992) was a Canadian career policeman and senior anti-drug officer in the Royal Canadian Mounted Police (RCMP), while simultaneously a co-conspirator with the West End Gang of Montreal and its leader Allan "The Weasel" Ross. Savoie died by suicide in his office at the RCMP headquarters in Ottawa after his links to organized crime were exposed by investigative journalists from The Fifth Estate television program. The exposure of Savoie shattered the Canadian people's image of the Mounties as an incorruptible police force and was described by the Canadian scholar Steven Schneider as "the biggest case of police corruption in Canada for years".

== Police career ==
Savoie was born in Montreal and joined the Royal Canadian Mounted Police (RCMP) in 1965. The French-Canadian Savoie worked as the RCMP's liaison officer at the Canadian embassy in Paris until 1986. In 1986, he had become one of the most senior officers working in the RCMP's anti-drug squad in Montreal. Upon his return to Montreal, Savoie experienced financial problems. In 1987, reflecting the new policy of glasnost ("openness") in the Soviet Union, Savoie took part in a joint Soviet-Canadian investigation of a drug trafficking ring concerning the vory v zakone ("thieves in law", i.e., Russian organized crime). Savoie twice visited Moscow to hold discussions with Soviet Militsiya officers. The investigation ended with a large shipment of hashish, that had arrived from Odessa aboard a Soviet freighter, being seized by the RCMP at the Port of Montreal.

=== Corrupt policeman ===
Through his work, Savoie came to know a prominent Montreal lawyer, Sidney Leithman, who usually defended gangsters. Although it was a major breach of ethics on the part of both men, Leithman and Savoie started to trade information, with Leithman informing on his own clients, while Savoie told Leithman much about what the RCMP knew about Montreal gangsters. The trading of information came to cause tensions between American and Canadian law enforcement as the Americans complained that whatever information they shared with the Canadians always seemed to reach Montreal organized crime.

When Savoie was promoted to be the chief of the RCMP's Montreal Drug Section in January 1989, there were concerns by other Mounties about his relationship with Leithman. A secret RCMP report from 1993 states: "From that moment on, his meetings with Sidney Leithman became more frequent. It was not unusual to see Leithman meeting with Inspector Savoie inside his Montreal Drug Section office. On at least one occasion, such a meeting took place behind closed doors and lasted more than a half an hour. When his clients were arrested, Leithman arrived quickly at the office of Inspector Savoie. On a few occasions during (a) trial of Colombian drug traffickers, Inspector Savoie made impromptu visits to the courtroom".

Later in 1989, at a meeting in Leithman's office, Savoie was introduced to West End Gang leader Allan "The Weasel" Ross, where it was agreed that Savoie would work for Ross, selling information in exchange for a regular salary of $200,000. In a report dated 8 October 1989, Savoie stated that he had first met Leithman regarding Ross in late September 1989. Writing in the third person, Savoie stated: "“Inspector Savoie stated that he had first met with attorney Sidney Leithman concerning Allan Ross at the end of September 1989. He reported that, according to Leithman, Ross was worried about the American investigation being conducted on him. After his conversation with Leithman, Inspector Savoie explained that he had decided to meet with Allan Ross to turn him into an informant". Savoie further wrote that he met Ross alone in Leithman's office on 6 October 1989, but nothing came of the meeting. Savoie's report appeared to be part of an attempt to build a defense should his contacts with Ross and Leithman be exposed. Savoie also claimed that he had the approval of a RCMP superintendent to meet Ross alone, a claim that the superintendent later denied. In January 1990, Savoie took a lavish three week long vacation without his wife.

Insistence by American law enforcement that there was a "leak" in the RCMP grew more intense after Savoie was promoted, and finally reached the point where the Americans refused to share information with the RCMP on the grounds that there must be a "mole" inside of the Mounties. As the director of the RCMP's national anti-drug squad, Savoie had access to all of the RCMP's investigations across Canada and access to information being shared by the American, European and Latin American police services as well. Despite the extra income, Savoie continued to live modestly and spent most of the bribe money on his mistress, although the Canadian journalist Robert Knuckle noted: "...that Savoie handled even that extravagance with discretion". Savoie was well liked and respected by his colleagues, and many found it difficult to believe that a man who was known for living modestly could be corrupt.

One RCMP officer, Carl MacLeod, once asked for Savoie to provide him with $3,500 in flash money to assist with an investigation that was about to expand from Toronto into Montreal, which Savoie refused. At the time, MacLeod felt that the rejection was due to bureaucratic politics, but has since speculated that Savoie's rejection of his request – which stymied his investigation – might had been due to corruption. One of Savoie's subordinates, Constable Jorge Leite, was also corrupt, selling information to the Cali Cartel of Colombia, which had a strong presence in Montreal at the time. Leite, a former Marine with the Portuguese Navy, had joined the RCMP in 1987, which valued him as a man fluent in four languages, namely Portuguese, Spanish, French, and English. Inès Cecila Barbosa, known as La Madrina ("the Godmother"), an agent of the Cali Cartel, served as their money launderer in Montreal, and it was to her that Leite had been selling information to. Savoie is also believed to have sold information to Barbosa. In April 1991, the RCMP was monitoring a 240-kilogram shipment of cocaine from the Cali Cartel to the West End Gang as part of Project Carton/Valpro, which it "lost track of" while Savoie met with Leithman three times the same week that the West End Gang received the cocaine that the RCMP had lost sight of.

In April 1991, a shipment of cocaine hidden in hammocks worth $410 million shipped from Colombia arrived at the port of Montreal, which the RCMP was aware of. Much to the surprise of the RCMP constables watching the warehouse where the cocaine was hidden, no-one arrived to pick it up. After waiting for a number of days, the RCMP seized the cocaine, but the officers involved were very puzzled by the fact that the West End Gang had not picked up the cocaine despite having ample time to do so. Newly arrived cocaine shipments are normally picked up as quickly as possible to prevent other gangsters from stealing the cocaine or the police from seizing it. In early May 1991, another shipment of cocaine from Colombia worth $340 million arrived at the port of Montreal hidden in aluminum silicate powder that the RCMP was also aware of. Once again, no one arrived at the warehouse to pick up the cocaine as the RCMP officers watching the warehouse waited in vain for someone to arrive. The cocaine was again seized, but it was felt to be very odd that no-one had arrived to pick it over the course of several days. Given the value of the cocaine in both shipments, it was realized that the only reason why no-one arrived to pick up the cocaine was because the West End Gang was aware that the RCMP was watching the warehouses where the cocaine was being stored. Savoie requested that the Internal Affairs department of the RCMP start an investigation to find out who was selling information to the West End Gang and singled out Leite as the officer most likely to be corrupt as he stated Leite seemed very greedy as he always complaining that he was never making enough money. Through Leite was a corrupt officer, it is believed that he was the "fall guy" for Savoie's corruption as Savoie needed someone to blame after it became very apparent by May 1991 that the West End Gang had a "mole" inside the RCMP. On 5 May 1991, an Internal Affairs investigation led by Inspector Yves Roussel began with the aim of finding the "mole".

According to a secret RCMP report from 1993, in May 1991, Savoie revealed the identity of an RCMP informer in the West End Gang to Leithman. On 5 May 1991, Leithman told someone whose name is still redacted on the report that he “controlled a high-ranking member of the RCMP, a regional director who sold information to the West End Gang" and "he had been paid for his services for several years." Leithman does not name the regional director, but he appears to be referring to Savoie.

On 13 May 1991, Leithman was murdered, gunned down in an ambush on a street in Mount Royal. Discovered inside of Leithman's car was a piece of paper with Savoie's unlisted phone number on it. An informer in the Montreal underworld mentioned that Leithman had in his office safe numerous photocopies of C237 forms (the daily reports that Mounties are required to submit to their superiors about the status of their investigations) and had given them to Ross. Another informer mentioned that he heard rumours in the underworld that Leithman had waved about C237 forms in his office as a symbol of his power while he also provided them to Ross. The most redacted section of the 1993 RCMP report is the one relating to Leithman's murder. The report states: "Inspector Savoie’s contacts with Sidney Leithman and Allan Ross in the spring of 1991 finally reveal the complex dynamics that linked the three men before the murder of Sidney Leithman. Those contacts may raise questions regarding Savoie’s possible role in Leithman’s murder on May 13, 1991".

Savoie was shielded for a time when Leite was exposed as corrupt in May 1991 and fled back to his native Portugal. Savoie shifted rumors of a "mole" in the RCMP onto Leite, whom he argued was the one who must been selling information as he maintained that the "unacceptably high failure rate" of drug investigations in Montreal since 1988 was due to Leite. However, there still remained the lingering question of who had tipped off Leite that he was facing arrest. Leite was clearly aware that he was under investigation by Internal Affairs as he claimed to be unable to work due to marital problems starting on 12 May 1991 as he went about methodically preparing his flight from Canada, which occurred on 22 May 1991. On 1 June 1991, Savoie was promoted to be the director of the RCMP's national anti-drug squad in Ottawa. On 7 October 1991, Ross was arrested in Florida. A police search of Ross's Montreal home revealed that the rumors about him having C237 forms were true. As C237 forms are closely guarded secrets and Ross had multiple C237 forms filed from different officers since 1989, it indicated that a senior RCMP officer had been selling them. Leite was just a constable and would not have access to the C237 reports filed by other Mounties. In April 1992, Savoie was transferred over to become the assistant director of the Criminal Intelligence Service.

=== Downfall ===
The journalist Daniel Burke of The Fifth Estate television show heard rumours that a senior Mountie was working for Ross, and began an investigation. Burke came from an Irish working-class family in Montreal and knew many people from the Pointe-Saint-Charles neighborhood of Montreal where most of the West End Gang originates from. In his work as a journalist, Burke had many contacts with the Montreal underworld. Burke was also addicted to cocaine at the time and as a drug addict knew many of the drug dealers of Montreal very well. Burke stated in a 2008 interview: "I was on drugs then and I was fucked...I found out about it from one of the drug traffickers I knew. Savoie was corrupt. He was taking money from one of the biggest drug traffickers in Canada". Burke was able to deceive Savoie into talking with him by claiming he was doing a story on the West End Gang, and then confronted him with the evidence linking him to Leithman and Ross, which Savoie had not expected. In 1992, The Fifth Estate aired an episode that exposed the close links between Savoie, Ross, and Leithman. The episode revealed that Savoie had met Ross at an Italian restaurant in Montreal and at Leithman's office. The episode also revealed that Savoie had repeatedly phoned the Washington, D.C. headquarters of the Drug Enforcement Administration (DEA) to ask what the DEA knew about Ross and was always refused under the grounds the DEA simply did not trust the RCMP anymore. The U.S. federal prosecutor at Ross's trial in Florida, David McGee, was interviewed and stated he had seen evidence that Ross had a source inside the RCMP.

On The Fifth Estate, Savoie was interviewed where he stated: "Allan Ross, for us from '86 to '91, was not one of our problems. Allan Ross – everybody says he was head of this. People were saying this. But I must say that in my work, I wouldn't be able to say that. And we were not sure, we never had him pinned". In a follow-up interview on another show of The Fifth Estate, Savoie stated: "I know with Allan Ross, there's no doubt that was word always you know that he had access to somebody and you know maybe he did...And I gather from you wanting to talk to me that you feel maybe I was one of those people on the list and that's fair game I guess...Sometimes people make mistakes. What can I tell you?" Savoie claimed that he was trying to persuade Ross to work as an informer, and then changed his story to say that was trying to work out a plea bargain to spare Ross from being imprisoned in the United States. Savoie went to these meetings alone and without telling his superiors, both of which were major violations of the RCMP's rules. When asked by Burke about these violations of the rules, Savoie could give no explanations for his actions. Burke recalled of the interview in 2011: "He sounded like a man backed into a corner. Very worried." In another interview with Hana Gartner of The Fifth Estate, Savoie stated that he last seen Ross in May 1992 just before his conviction in Florida and that: "He [Ross] wasn't an informant, nor was I an informant for him. But I knew him. Put it that way. I met him". The documentary aired footage of Savoie talking with Ross in a Montreal coffee shop. Gartner also brought up the case of Leite, asking Savoie pointed questions about who had tipped Leite off that he was under investigation and facing arrest for corruption. On Friday, 18 December 1992, Savoie told a fellow Mountie that he was feeling depressed because a journalist was going to run an unflattering story about his relationship with an informer. Later the same day, Savoie broke down in tears in front of a superintendent, but was unwilling to talk about what was distressing him. Savoie's wife reported that he did not seem upset or sad during his last weekend with her.

== Death ==
On 21 December 1992, Savoie committed suicide in his office in Ottawa just minutes before he was due to face interrogation by RCMP Internal Affairs officers. He pressed his service revolver against his temple while wrapping his gun through the sleeve of his uniform to silence the blast before pulling the trigger. Savoie's suicide was not noticed at first as the secretaries mistook the gunshot for a desk drawer being slammed shut, and his corpse was only discovered fifteen minutes after his death when the Internal Affairs detectives went to his office to see why he had not arrived for the interview. He had learned days earlier that he was to be questioned about his links to organized crime. Savoie, who had been the subject of an internal police investigation for several months, killed himself the day before CBC aired another Fifth Estate program on drug trafficking which further implicated him, alleging that he had warned Allan Ross that U.S. authorities were preparing an indictment against him.

He was buried on Christmas Eve 1992 with no honor guard of the Mounties as is usually the case with an RCMP officer who has died. A Montreal police detective, John Westlake, who had known Savoie explained his suicide: "He had no choice but to kill himself because of the circumstances of his family and the disgrace of going to jail. Have you ever heard of an inspector in the RCMP going to jail? Very rare. They'd kill themselves before that". Corporal Jean-Pierre Boucher (no relation to Maurice Boucher) of the RCMP who had known Savoie stated in 2007: "He became as bad as the guys he was after. It was a terrible shame, because Savoie was a good man. In a moment of weakness, he went bad. That's all it takes, you know. When Savoie took one envelope, he was finished. As soon as you take one, they've got you and you're done". MacLeod stated that Savoie was very similar to Patrick Kelly, saying: "To me, the Savoie case has a lot in common with the Kelly case. They're both examples of what can happen to someone who gets too close to the bad guys and the big money. You gotta to be able to handle that. But some guys can't and it ruins them". Burke stated about Savoie's suicide: "For all I know, it may have been a choice his colleagues forced him to make because they didn't want him to reveal further corruption. I don’t know. All I know is that I didn’t feel fucking bad about it." In 2011, Burke stated when asked if he felt guilty about Savoie's suicide: "People ask me if I felt bad. Fuck no. That was the game. He was a dirty cop, and I nabbed him."

The exposure of Savoie destroyed the popular image of the Mounties as an incorruptible force. Even more humiliating for the RCMP was that journalists from The Fifth Estate TV show exposed Savoie rather than his fellow policemen. There had been other cases of corrupt Mounties before, but Savoie was the most senior RCMP officer ever exposed as corrupt. Knuckle wrote: "Inspector Claude Savoie is the first senior RCMP officer to be caught on the take and the highest ranking Mountie to have his reputation marred by scandal and corruption". It is believed that with regard to the two shipments of cocaine at the port of Montreal that the West End Gang did not pick up in the spring of 1991 that it was Savoie rather than Leite who tipped off the West End Gang that the warehouses were being watched. Leite was just a RCMP constable while Savoie was the head of the national anti-drug squad, making it more likely that the latter rather the former would the necessary information about what the RCMP knew about the West End Gang.

The journalist Julian Sher, who worked on the Savoie story alongside Burke, stated in a 2010 interview that he felt guilty about Savoie's suicide saying: "All I could think was that his kids would never have another Christmas with their father. But I have to remind myself that I'm not the one who accepted the bribes." In 2022, Sher stated: "I didn't kill him, I didn't load the gun, I didn't put the gun to his head. He made his choices. I'm not responsible but if Dan [Burke] and I had decided not to do the story, if we had not covered this stuff, would he be alive? He might have decided to kill himself when the RCMP investigated him...The lesson I learned from that is the consequences of our work. For many of the people we tell stories about, it's their lives and sometimes their deaths." In December 1993, the RCMP presented a 75-page report about l'affaire de Savoie that was so embarrassing that the Solicitor General Herb Gray only allowed a 2 page summary to be published. The full report was only obtained by Paul Cherry, the crime correspondent of The Montreal Gazette, in 2022 and even today much of the report is still redacted.

The journalist Yves Lavigne wrote: "No one knows how many police officers in all levels of law enforcement were recruited by Inspector Savoie to provide information to drug smugglers and sabotage investigations, or whether these moles are still in place. No one knows how case or informants have been compromised. Inspector Savoie had unlimited access to files and the heads of the world's criminal intelligence services. He kept more secrets in death than he did in life and his legacy may still haunt the RCMP today, as his hand-picked moles gnaw away at its effectiveness in the war against drug-rich criminals".

== See also ==
- List of controversies involving the Royal Canadian Mounted Police

== Books ==
- Auger, Michel; Edwards, Peter (2004). The Encyclopedia of Canadian Organized Crime: From Captain Kidd to Mom Boucher. Toronto: McClelland & Stewart. ISBN 0771030495.
- Knuckle, Robert (2007). A Master of Deception: Working Undercover for the RCMP. Renfrew: General Store Publishing House. ISBN 978-1897113660.
- O'Connor, D'Arcy (2011). Montreal's Irish Mafia: The True Story of the Infamous West End Gang. Toronto: John Wiley & Sons.
- Schneider, Stephen (2009). Iced: The Story of Organized Crime in Canada. Toronto: John Wiley & Sons. ISBN 978-0470835005..
- Lavigne, Yves (1999). Hells Angels at War. Toronto: HarperCollins. ISBN 9780002000246.
