= Daniel Burke =

Daniel Burke may refer to:

- Daniel J. Burke (born 1951), former Democratic member of the Illinois House of Representatives
- Dan Burke (baseball) (1868–1933), Major League Baseball player
- Daniel Burke (Australian politician) (1827–1927), member of the Tasmanian House of Assembly
- Daniel Burke (executive) (1929–2011), president of the American Broadcasting Corporation
- Daniel Burke (rower) (born 1974), Australian rower
- Daniel W. Burke (1841–1911), American soldier and Medal of Honor recipient
- Daniel Burke (music promoter), Canadian journalist and music promoter.
