= Hana Gartner =

Canadian investigative journalist

Hana Gartner CM
- Born: 1948 (age 77–78); Prague, Czechoslovakia (now Czech Republic
- Education: Loyola College MA York University 2017
- Occupations: Television journalist, radio journalist
- Children: Gar • Samm

Hana Gartner CM is a retired Canadian investigative journalist who is best known as the host and interviewer of several programs for the Canadian Broadcasting Corporation.

== Early life and education ==
Gartner was born in 1948 in Prague, Czechoslovakia, but grew up in Chomedey, Laval, Quebec. She studied at Loyola College (now Concordia University), in Montreal, and graduated cum laude.

== Career ==
Gartner began her career as a radio host at Montreal's CJAD in 1970.

In 1974, she joined the Canadian Broadcasting Corporation as a TV news anchor at CBMT Montreal. She moved to Toronto the following year to work on the program In Good Company, alongside Roger Abbott, Don Ferguson, Nancy White, and Gene DiNovi.

Gartner became the host of CBC Radio's This Country in the Morning and replaced Judy LaMarsh in 1976. The following year, she moved back to television as a co-host of both the CBC's local newscast at CBLT in Toronto and the network's afternoon public affairs program Take 30. (Previous hosts of Take 30 had included Mary Lou Finlay, Moses Znaimer, and Adrienne Clarkson.)

In 1982, Gartner became co-host of the CBC's primetime TV newsmagazine, The Fifth Estate. In 1992, she worked alongside Julian Sher and Daniel Burke in exposing Inspector Claude Savoie of the Royal Canadian Mounted Police as corrupt. In her interviews with Savoie, she asked him questions about his business relationships with the shady lawyer Sidney Leithman and the gangster Allan "the Weasel" Ross. Savoie told her that he had last seen Ross in May 1992 and that: "He [Ross] wasn't an informant, nor was I an informant for him. But I knew him. Put it that way. I met him". The scandal ended with Savoie committing suicide in his office at the RCMP's national headquarters in Ottawa. Gartner stated that she was in shock at the time as she recalled: "We were both like whirling dervishes. No story is worth anybody offing himself."

In 1995, she replaced Pamela Wallin as co-host with Peter Mansbridge of CBC's flagship newshour, Prime Time News, as it returned to 10 p.m. and reverted to its previous name, The National. Gartner hosted the National Magazine portion of the programme, which has interviews, extended features, and documentaries and was the second half of the hour, following Mansbridge's newscast.

Gartner left The National, returned to The Fifth Estate in 2000, and remained with the programme for 11 years.

On May 11, 2011, Gartner announced her retirement from the CBC.

== Awards ==
Gartner has won five Gemini Awards and has been nominated 18 times in the Gemini hosting, anchoring, and interviewing categories during her career. She has also twice won the special Gemini Gordon Sinclair Award for excellence in broadcast journalism: in 1985 and in 2006. In 2011, she was awarded a Michener Award for her story about a troubled teen who died while in the Ontario corrections system.

In 2019, she was appointed as a Member of the Order of Canada.

== Books ==
- Knuckle, Robert (2007). A Master of Deception: Working Undercover for the RCMP. Renfrew: General Store Publishing House. ISBN 978-1897113660.
