= Jorge Leite =

Jorge Manuel Oliveria Leite (born 1950) is a former Portuguese Canadian officer of the Royal Canadian Mounted Police (RCMP) linked to a high-profile case of corruption.

== From Marine to policeman ==
Leite was born in Portugal and joined the Marine Corps of the Portuguese Navy, leading him to fight in the colonial wars in Africa. As a Marine, Leite fought for five years between 1969 and 1974 in the wars in Angola and Mozambique. By the late 1960s, the Portuguese Army had developed serious morale problems as many of the teenage conscripts saw no point to the seemingly endless wars to hold on to Portugal's African colonies, leading to the all-volunteer Marine Corps playing a prominent role in the wars as an elite force committed to upholding Portuguese imperialism in Africa. Leite is fluent in four languages, namely Portuguese, Spanish, French, and English. After leaving the Marine Corps, Leite lived in Great Britain where he worked on the North Sea oil rigs. In 1979, he immigrated to Canada and settled in Cambridge. In Cambridge, he worked as a millwright with an annual income of $60,000.

In 1987, he joined the RCMP, which appreciated his fluency in four languages. The Mounties had traditionally been dominated ever since the force had been founded in 1873 by men of British descent, which led to a campaign to bring more diversity to the force starting in the 1960s. The requirement imposed in the 1960s that senior RCMP commanders be fluently bilingual led to something of a French-Canadian armlock on the senior ranks by the 1980s as more French-Canadians are fluent in English than English-Canadians are fluent in French, which to concerns that there was an overrepresentation of Quebecois officers in the senior ranks. There were questions raised about Leite's character during his recruitment screening, but he was allowed to join the Mounties as part of the campaign to make the RCMP more diverse as he was a fluently bilingual immigrant whose first language was neither French nor English. Leite is a short man standing 5'4, but his experiences as a Marine were felt to compensate for his diminutive stature. The RCMP had trouble attracting immigrants as recruits because in many Third World nations the profession of a policeman is associated with corruption and brutality, leading to a career with the Mounties to be seen as disreputable by many immigrants.

After completing his training in Regina, Leite served in the RCMP's Toronto office and as a translator for RCMP officers assigned to liaison in Spain concerning an investigation into the Cali Cartel. In 1988, he was assigned to RCMP's Montreal office, where he worked under Claude Savoie. Another Mountie at the Montreal office, Jean-Pierre Boucher, stated about him: "I knew who he was because I saw him around the office. He was a small guy...maybe five foot seven...with dark, curly hair. I never worked with him closely, but I understand that he was just an average investigator...nothing special". During his time in Montreal, Leite had a reputation as an aggressive "gung ho" constable who was very anxious to be promoted. Leite complained incessantly that he was never making enough money and he constantly talked about returning to Portugal to live his dream of being a high end restaurateur. Leite charged it was impossible to save enough money on a constable's salary to open up the expensive restaurant he wanted to own, which he felt to be deeply unjust. He often complained that he had taken a $25,000 reduction in his annual income, as his annual income as a millwright had been higher than his starting salary as a constable. Leite tried his hand at business on the side, running a limousine service that failed. The Canadian journalist Yves Lavinge wrote that Leite's behavior should have "raised eyebrows" as he had a most "curious attitude" with his expectations about having a lavish lifestyle that was far beyond the salary of a constable, but it did not. Lavinge wrote that Leite seemed to have no interest in public service, and appeared to be only interested in financial gain, which led him to argue that he should never had been allowed to join the RCMP in the first place.

== Corrupt policeman ==
According to a Montreal drug dealer, Luis Lopes, Leite had "bugged him incessantly" to introduce him to Inès Cecila Barbosa. Barbosa, better known as La Madrina ("the Godmother"), was the Montreal agent of the Cali Cartel. Leite by his own admission sold information about RCMP's operations to Barbosa 49 times over a three-month period. It is generally believed that Leite was romantically involved with Barbosa. Leite opened up a joint bank account denominated in U.S. dollars at the Canadian Imperial Bank of Commence branch in LaSalle with Barbosa on which she wrote $880,000 American dollars' worth of bouncing cheques. Leite also returned to Barbosa her Columbian passport which the RCMP had confiscated after her arrest in 1990. Barbosa, known to French-Canadians as la marraine du Cartel Cali à Montreal, was a plumb quadragenarian described by those who knew her as homely and "unattractive". She was known to greatly enjoy male attention. Barbosa served as a money launder who between 1989 and 1992 laundered about $75 million for the Cali cartel via banks in Montreal.

In 1990, several RCMP documents were found on the arrest sites of people linked to the Cali cartel, which led to the conclusion that there was a possible "mole" working for the Cali cartel in the RCMP. The RCMP also found that someone had faxed confidential information to people connected with the Cali cartel from their Montreal office, using a scrambler. In May 1991, Leite flew down to Cartagena to meet the leaders of the Cali cartel to discuss shipping cocaine into Montreal. Leite suggested that the remote and sparsely inhabited Labrador region of Newfoundland was the best area to smuggle cocaine into. Leite argued that Labrador had a rugged coastline full of bays and inlets while the interior was full of lakes on which it was possible to land float planes on. Leite met Diego Ortiz, an underboss of the Cali Cartel, during his Colombian trip. The RCMP later accused Leite of taking at least $500,000 in bribes from Barbosa. Barbosa also gave Leite the gift of a Toyota Previa mini-van worth $40,000. The $500,000 was for a three-month period between March–May 1991. It is possible that Leite received more in the way of bribes prior to March 1991 as the amount of money in his bank account swelled massively over the course of 1990 and the first half of 1991. Finally, Leite received the gift of a condo in his native Portugal. In May 1991, Leite was serving as the bodyguard to Douglas Jaworski, a Canadian pilot who worked for the Medellin cartel in the 1980s and who flow in numerous shipments of cocaine. After being arrested in March 1989, Jaworski turned Crown's evidence in return for a lighter sentence.

== Exposure ==
In April 1991, a shipment of cocaine from Colombia hidden in hammocks worth $410 million arrived at the port of Montreal, which the RCMP was aware of. Much to the surprise of the RCMP officers watching the warehouse where the cocaine-filled hammocks were stored, no-one arrived to pick it up, which was felt to be very strange given the value of the cocaine. A newly arrived shipment of cocaine is normally picked up as soon as possible by the intended recipients to avoid theft by other gangsters or being seized by the police. In early May 1991, another shipment of cocaine from Colombia worth $340 million arrived at the port of Montreal, which the RCMP was again aware of. A police team was awaiting to arrest the West End Gang drug dealers at the warehouse holding the cocaine, but no-one ever arrived to claim the shipment. Given the value of the cocaine in both cases, it was concluded that someone must have forewarned the underworld, and an internal affairs investigation led by Inspector Yves Roussel was opened on 5 May 1991. The internal affairs investigation was requested by Savoie who singled out Leite as the officer most likely to be corrupt. At the request of the Internal Affairs detective team, false information was provided to Leite, which in return was found to be in the possession of the Cali Cartel's agents, which led the team to focus their attention on him.

The Internal Affairs detectives soon discovered that the amount of money in Leite's bank accounts had swollen far beyond the salary of a Mountie constable and found circumstantial evidence that Leite might have also been dating Barbosa. On 12 May 1991, Leite claimed to be unable to work because of marital problems, and repeated that excuse everyday until his flight from Canada. On 13 May 1991, a prominent Montreal lawyer, Sidney Leithman was murdered. It appears that Leite was tipped off that he was under investigation and facing imminent arrest as he set about preparing methodically to leave Canada shortly after the investigation of him started. Further adding to the suspicion that someone had warned Leite was that both he and his wife had gone on a major spending spree during their last month in Canada, raking up thousands of dollars on their credit cards, which neither made any effort to pay once the couple fled.

On 22 May 1991, Leite, who had emerged as the prime suspect in the corruption investigation, fled Canada to Portugal, which does not extradite its citizens. Leite went to Toronto, where he booked a flight to Lisbon along with his two daughters. Leite also air-freighted his new Toyota Previa minivan from Toronto to Lisbon. A few days after his flight, Leite's wife, Maria, who worked as a nurse at Montreal's Reddy Memorial Hospital suddenly resigned and also went to Portugal. Maria Leite brought along a briefcase full of $100,000 in cash. Once he arrived in Portugal, Leite faxed a letter of resignation to the RCMP's Montreal office and asked about the details of his policeman's pension, a demand that was regarded as outrageous. One vehicle that Leite left behind in Montreal was his Mercedes-Benz, which afterwards became the property of Glen Cameron, an important drug dealer with the West End Gang. Savoie-who was corrupt-used the Leite scandal as a way to shift attention from himself onto Leite, whom he accused of being the one selling information to the underworld. However, there still remained the lingering question of who had tipped off Leite that he was facing arrest. A further question concerned why Leite had left himself open to exposure by informing the West End Gang that the warehouse was being watched, which led to the possibility being considered that it was in fact someone else who had informed the West End Gang.

John Westlake, an Irish-Canadian detective with the Service de police de la Ville de Montréal has argued in interviews his belief that there is a connection between the murder of Leithman and the Leite case. Westlake believes that Leite was in some way involved in Leithman's murder and in his viewpoint may have been the man who killed Leithman. Some such as the journalist Robert Knuckle have argued that Barbosa ordered Leithman's murder after learning from Savoie that he was a paid RCMP informer. The Toronto Star reporter Dale Brazao wrote: "The scandal severely tarnished Canada's national police force, shining a spotlight on the activities of the entire RCMP drug squad in Montreal during the early '90s."

== Life in hiding ==
Leite purchased a luxury villa overlooking the sea in Calhandiz. Leite rarely spoke with the locals in Calhandiza, but he was noted for his lifestyle as he bred snails in his vineyard and had a swimming pool in his backyard. Leite also owned a condo worth $140,000 Canadian dollars in Albufeira. A policeman stated the former owner of the Albufeira condo was a Montreal drug dealer and that: "This was an outright gift to Jorge Leite - no money changed hands".

In 1993, Leite was charged in Canada with corruption, breach of trust and fraud. The fraud charges related to the thousands of dollars in credit card debt he had run up in May 1991 and had never repaid. The RCMP only made desultory efforts to find Leite, whom they wrongly believed to be in the Middle East. In 1998, Leite was finally found by a Toronto Star reporter Dale Brazao, who discovered him in Portugal.

Brazao stated that Leite was easy to find as he stated that it was just a matter of finding and following his red Toyota Previa minivan with Quebec license plates (Leite never switched over to Portuguese license plates), which he was very fond of. Brazao wrote in 2016 about the Leite case: "Canada’s national police force, which according to folklore “always gets their man,” could not find Leite. The Star asked me to try. As I’ve told generations of young reporters, the secret to finding someone who does not want to be found, is simple — Find the Car, Sit on the Car. Everybody goes to their car at some point.". After receiving reports that Leite's minivan had been seen in Praia da Vieira, the village that was the hometown of Maria Leite's parents, Brazao was able via Maria's father to interview her, where she denied her husband was corrupt. Maria Leite denied the rumors of her husband having an affair with Barbosa and claimed that he left the RCMP because he was being bullied for being short. Brazao was unable to interview Leite himself, but was able to covertly take photographs of him getting into his minivan, which confirmed that he was indeed in Portugal.

== Trial, conviction and return to Canada ==
After Leite was exposed in 1998, the Canadian government asked for Leite to be put on trial in Portugal. Under Portuguese law, no Portuguese citizen may be extradited to face charges abroad, which protected the dual citizen Leite from extradition to Canada. Leite wanted to face a trial in Canada as under Canadian law, the burden of proof rests on the prosecution while the precise opposite is the case under Portuguese law. The Crown attorney Randall Richmond told Brazao: "He wanted to negotiate his return".

On 26 November 1998, Leite was arrested by the Portuguese police on an Interpol warrant. The RCMP forwarded a dossier 500 pages long of evidence against Leite to the Portuguese prosecutor Joao Parracho. Parracho admitted that Leite would probably get a light sentence if convicted, telling Brazao: "This happened in a foreign country. It was a long time ago." At his trial in January 1999, Leite claimed to have been working undercover for Savoie, but he was not able to present any evidence in support of this claim. He argued that all of the money he accepted from Barbosa he had handed over to Savoie, who was conveniently dead and unable to confirm or deny his account.

Leite claimed to be part of an ultra-secret undercover operation, reporting directly to Savoie, and had sold information downloaded from the RCMP's computers to Barbosa under Savoie's orders. Leite testified: "Everything I did, I did on orders and knowledge of my chief. I had specific instructions from my supervisor to infiltrate the group". Leite admitted to taking about $40,000 in cash together with the free Toyota Previa mini-van from Barbosa. However, despite his claims to have handed over all of the bribe money to Savoie, he also claimed not to have taken receipts from him or listed the payments in the RCMP's logs, making his story hearsay as he lacked any documentation to support his account. Leite also testified that he was making about $150,000 per annum as a RCMP constable and had purchased his villa and the condo with money from his savings. Inspector Roussel in rebuttal testified that Leite in fact made only $56,000 per annum as a Mountie constable while Maria Leite had made only $16,000 per annum as a part-time nurse, making it impossible for the Leites to own both a seaside villa and a condo out of savings from their legitimate income. Leite denied being a fugitive as he testified that his sudden flight and resignation from the Mounties in May 1991 was because he had been "feeling oppressed".

Kenny Fisher, a member of the West End Gang has claimed that the man on trial in Portugal was not Leite as he maintains had he been murdered by the RCMP to cover up the Savoie scandal and the man on trial was an imposter. Fisher claimed: "I know for a fact that Leite is now dead. He was eliminated by RCMP agents in Portugal to shut him up". Fisher who spent the years from 2002 to 2008 in a Mexican prison following his conviction on drug charges claims to learned this story during his imprisonment. The Canadian journalist D'Arcy O'Connor wrote that Fisher's theory of a pseudo-Leite who was able to fool even his own wife and children was highly unlikely and that Fisher has never presented any proof of his claims.

On 19 January 1999, Leite was found guilty of the corruption and breach of trust charges, but acquitted on the fraud charges. The court gave Leite a three-year suspended sentence, which saved him from doing any prison time and fined him a sum equal to $1,500 Canadian. Boucher stated: "We were baffled by the sentence he received...absolutely baffled". Justice Jose Martins told Leite in sentencing him: "You are almost 50 years old and it's time you got some brains". Because of the principle of double jeopardy, Leite was protected from being tried again in Canada. Knuckle wrote: "The simple fact in law is that Leite was tried in Portugal, he was found guilty, given a sentence-albeit a ridiculous one-and cannot be tried again for these crimes". Following his conviction, Leite returned to Canada and settled in Mississauga.

== Books ==
- Knuckle, Robert (2007). A Master of Deception: Working Undercover for the RCMP. Renfrew: General Store Publishing House. ISBN 978-1897113660.
- O'Connor, D'Arcy (2011). Montreal's Irish Mafia: The True Story of the Infamous West End Gang. Toronto: John Wiley & Sons.
- Schneider, Stephen (2009). Iced: The Story of Organized Crime in Canada. Toronto: John Wiley & Sons. ISBN 978-0470835005..
- Lavigne, Yves (1999). Hells Angels at War. Toronto: HarperCollins. ISBN 9780002000246.
