= Gilbert Galvan =

American bank robber (born 1957)

- Born: Gilbert William Galvan Jr. 1957 (age 68–69); Los Angeles, California
- Other names: Robert Whiteman; Flying Bandit; Phantom Bandit
- Known for: Multiple bank robberies across Canada

Gilbert William Galvan Jr. (born c. 1957) is an American bank robber. Having spent many of his adult years in prison, Galvan fled to Canada where he assumed the name Robert Lee Whiteman and began a three-year spree robbing banks and jewelry stores in the 1980s. The media dubbed him the Flying Bandit and the Phantom Bandit. Galvan's exploits were the subject of a 1996 true crime book, The Flying Bandit, written by Robert Knuckle and Ed Arnold, which was adapted into the 2022 film Bandit.

== Criminal career ==
In the United States, Galvan had embezzled from Western Union. In 1984, he escaped from prison in St. Joseph County, Michigan, and fled to Ontario where he took a new name, Robert Lee Whiteman. While living in a men's hostel in Ottawa he met his wife Janice, who was from nearby Pembroke, Ontario. The couple soon moved back to Pembroke to be closer to Janice's family. Around this time Galvan claimed to have found work as a traveling business consultant. He began robbing banks in 1984.

From the Pembroke Airport, Galvan was able to travel to Toronto Pearson International Airport, where he would transfer to Air Canada flights all across the country. With this method, his luggage was transferred to the connecting flight without going through security, permitting him to transport the weapons he would use in his robberies. In some of his jewelry store robberies, Galvan had an accomplice.

Galvan's method was to wear a disguise, carry a weapon (which he never fired during any of the robberies), and pass a note to a teller. Galvan robbed banks in every Canadian province except Prince Edward Island and Newfoundland. His takes ranged from $600 cash in his first robbery to $1.2 million in jewelry. His thefts totaled $251,333 in cash and more than $2 million in jewelry. Galvan was dubbed the Flying Bandit by Canadian media during his crime spree robbing banks and jewelry stores.

When Galvan and an accomplice stole $1.2 million in jewelry in Vancouver, they left behind a gun which police traced to a break-in in Ottawa.

A long-term investigation by police into stolen goods in the Ottawa area came across a man named Robert Whiteman fencing jewelry. Police determined that Whiteman had no social insurance number or birth certificate, but found a trail of credit-card receipts in that name. Comparing credit-card receipts and airline receipts led police to surveil Whiteman's residence in Pembroke where they gathered enough evidence to charge him.

When he was arrested in 1987, Galvan said he had planned to confess to his wife and move with her to the Turks and Caicos Islands.

Galvan pleaded guilty to 59 armed robberies in Canada, plus 17 related charges. In 1988, Galvan was sentenced to 20 years. He was deported from Canada to prison in Wisconsin in 1994 and released in 1998. After his release, he robbed a bank in McHenry, Illinois, in December 2000 and April 2001, for which he was sentenced to 15 years. In December, 2014, Galvan was released from federal custody.

In May, 2015, Galvan was arrested for retail theft in Barrington, Illinois, and was sentenced to 50 days in jail.

== In popular culture ==
Robert Knuckle published The Flying Bandit, Bringing Down Canada's Most Daring Armed Robber in 1996.

In 2005, the Canadian true crime series Masterminds (Canadian TV series) featured Galvan's exploits in episode 39.

Galvan's crimes were fictionalized in the 2022 film Bandit, starring Josh Duhamel who met with Galvan during filming. Duhamel said Galvan told him that he had "wanted to create a life and family, and his only option in his mind was to start robbing banks."

== Personal life ==
Galvan and his wife, whom he met in Ottawa, were married in Hamilton, Bermuda and had at least two children. (Note: At the time of Galvan's arrest in Canada, his wife was pregnant; however, there is no information about a third child.) According to the 2022 film Bandit, they divorced in 1989.
