= In Good Company (TV program) =

Canadian television program

- Genre: Entertainment
- Presented by: Hana Gartner
- Country of origin: Canada
- Original language: English
- No. of seasons: 1

Production
- Producer: Bob Gibbons
- Running time: 30–60 minutes

Original release
- Network: CBC Television
- Release: 22 September 1975 – 31 May 1976

In Good Company is a Canadian entertainment and current affairs television program that aired on CBC Television from 1975 to 1976.

== Premise ==
Hana Gartner (Take 30, The Fifth Estate) hosted this Toronto-produced program. Segments featured presenters such as Rod Coneybeare, Ruthie Lunenfeld and Ben Wicks, with satirical segments featuring the Royal Canadian Air Farce's Roger Abbott and Don Ferguson. The program also included hidden camera features produced by John Kastner.

== Scheduling ==
The first season of this half-hour program was broadcast on Mondays, Wednesdays and Fridays at 7:00 p.m. (Eastern) from 22 September 1975 to 9 January 1976. The second season aired on Mondays only in an hour-long format from 12 January to 31 May 1976.
