= Bandit (film) =

- Theatrical release poster
- Directed by: Allan Ungar
- Written by: Kraig Wenman
- Based on: The Flying Bandit by Robert Knuckle
- Produced by: Eric Gozlan; Ryan D. Smith; Jordan Yale Levine; Jordan Beckerman
- Starring: Josh Duhamel; Mel Gibson; Elisha Cuthbert; Nestor Carbonell
- Cinematography: Alex Chinnici
- Edited by: Michael Lane; Allan Ungar
- Music by: Aaron Gilhuis; John Paesano
- Production companies: Goldrush Entertainment; Yale Productions
- Distributed by: Quiver Distribution; Redbox Entertainment
- Release date: September 23, 2022
- Running time: 126 minutes
- Country: Canada
- Language: English

Bandit is a 2022 Canadian biographical crime film directed by Allan Ungar, written by Kraig Wenman, and starring Josh Duhamel, Elisha Cuthbert, Nestor Carbonell and Mel Gibson. The film is based on the true life story of Gilbert Galvan Jr (also known as The Flying Bandit), who still holds a record for the most consecutive robberies in Canadian history. The story and screenplay by Kraig Wenman is largely based on interviews and accounts featured in the 1996 true crime book The Flying Bandit by Robert Knuckle and Ed Arnold.

Redbox Entertainment and Quiver Distribution acquired North American distribution rights to the film and released it in theatres and on demand on September 23, 2022. The film received mostly positive reviews, with critics calling it a career-best performance by Duhamel.

== Premise ==
Gilbert Galvan Jr, a charming career criminal, escapes from a Michigan prison and crosses the border into Ontario, Canada where he assumes a new identity as Robert Whiteman. After falling in love with a woman he cannot provide for, he turns to robbing banks and discovers that he is exceptionally good at it. Under the guise of a security analyst, Robert begins flying around the country robbing multiple cities in a day, eventually catching the attention of national news outlets that dub him "The Flying Bandit". With his notoriety growing in record time, he is put into the direct sight of a ruthless detective who will stop at nothing to bring him down.

== Cast ==
- Josh Duhamel as Gilbert Galvan Jr/Robert Whiteman
- Mel Gibson as Tommy Kay
- Elisha Cuthbert as Andrea Hudson
- Nestor Carbonell as John Snydes

== Production ==
=== Casting ===
On October 30, 2020, it was announced that Josh Duhamel would star as Gilbert Galvan Jr in an adaptation of Robert Knuckle's book The Flying Bandit, which details the life of Galvan. On May 19, 2021, Mel Gibson and Elisha Cuthbert joined the cast. On June 15, 2021, it was reported that Nestor Carbonell had joined the cast as a detective hunting Duhamel's character.

=== Filming ===
Filming was originally planned to take place in Vancouver and Ottawa, but due to the COVID-19 pandemic, most of the production was relocated to the state of Georgia. Film crews were spotted in and around the Valdosta area in May and June 2021. Additional filming took place in Ottawa in September 2021.

During interviews with Collider and Screen Rant, director Allan Ungar revealed that even though the shooting schedule was cut from 32 days down to 21, the production still managed to shoot 200 scenes in 95 sets and locations. This often required Ungar to be directing three units at once, sometimes with cast member Nestor Carbonell's help. Carbonell tore his Achilles tendon while filming the chase scene for The Big Vancouver. Although he was advised to go in for surgery immediately, he decided to stay on until the completion of principal photography with the assistance of a walking boot. Despite this, only a few of the scenes involving his character Snydes had to be rewritten.

== Release ==
The film was theatrically released in the United States and Canada on September 23, 2022, and was also made available on digital platforms. In its first two weeks of release, Bandit was the #1 movie on iTunes across multiple categories and was the 5th most watched film on the platform.

Bandit was a global streaming success, reaching #1 on multiple platforms. Upon its debut on Paramount Plus Canada, it was the #1 film in its first week. It was released in the UK and several countries across Europe as an Amazon Original on Prime Video on February 22, 2023 where it spent its first two weeks at #1 and #2, and remained in the top 10 of all films for its first month. On Netflix, it became the #1 movie in multiple countries and remained in the top 5 in 19 others. It also reached #1 on Apple TV in Canada, Australia, Spain and Russia.

On October 28, 2022, a month after its release, Redbox announced that the film was the most-watched original title of 2022 and their second-best performing release ever.

== Reception ==
=== Critical response ===
Critical reception for the film was mostly positive, with many critics and journalists praising Josh Duhamel for delivering a career-best performance as well as Ungar's direction. On Rotten Tomatoes, 74% of 35 critics gave the film a positive review, with the critic consensus declaring: "It struggles to consistently capture its fact-based story's stranger-than-fiction charm, but Bandit mostly works -- and Josh Duhamel has never been better."

=== Accolades ===
The film won the award for Best Soundtrack at the 2023 Canadian Sync Awards as part of Canadian Music Week.
