= Bob Johnstone (broadcaster) =

Canadian journalist and broadcaster

Bob Johnstone (c. 1930 – September 2, 2012) was a Canadian journalist and broadcaster. For many years he hosted the CBC Radio programme Today in History and was one of the first reporters on the CBC Television programme the fifth estate.

He began his journalism career as a reporter for The Toronto Star, and later worked with the CBC as a court and crime reporter.

His book, Today in History, a collection of selected transcripts from the radio show, won the 1998 Pierre Berton Award for Achievement in Popularizing Canadian History.

== Personal life ==
Johnstone was married to Margaret and had two daughters.

He died of cancer in Toronto on September 2, 2012, at age 82.

== Bibliography ==
- Johnstone, Bob (1998). Today in History (revised ed.). Toronto: Warwick Publishing. ISBN 189402043X.
