= Julian Sher =

Canadian investigative journalist, filmmaker, author and newsroom trainer

Julian Sher is a Canadian investigative journalist, filmmaker, author and newsroom trainer based in Montreal, Quebec. He was an investigative producer for ten years then a senior producer for five years with the CBC's The Fifth Estate. He has written extensively about outlaw motorcycle gangs, child abuse and the justice system.

== Career ==
Sher began work at CBC in Montreal as an on-air radio journalist and show producer from 1983 to 1986. From 1986 to 1989, he was an investigative reporter for CBC Television in Montreal. He became a producer for the CBC network program The Fifth Estate from 1989 to 2001, where he covered wrongful convictions, police corruption, war criminals and biker gangs.

Sher played a leading role alongside Daniel Burke and Hana Gartner in exposing Inspector Claude Savoie of the Royal Canadian Mounted Police (RCMP) as corrupt. The scandal ended with Savoie committing suicide in his office at the RCMP's national headquarters on 21 December 1992. Sher stated in 2022 about Savoie's suicide: "I didn't kill him, I didn't load the gun, I didn't put the gun to his head. He made his choices. I'm not responsible but if Dan and I had decided not to do the story, if we had not covered this stuff, would he be alive? He might have decided to kill himself when the RCMP investigated him...The lesson I learned from that is the consequences of our work. For many of the people we tell stories about, it's their lives and sometimes their deaths." Sher then worked as an investigative reporter for the Globe and Mail and the Toronto Star. He returned to be the Senior Producer for CBC's The Fifth Estate from 2012 to 2018.

From 2001 to 2013, he wrote six investigative books. His book Somebody's Daughter: The Hidden Story of American's Prostituted Children and The Battle to Save Them was described by Publishers Weekly as a “thorough, deeply affecting study... [that] strikes a rare balance between revealing trauma and hope.”

His other book on child safety, One Child at a Time: Inside the Police Hunt to Rescue Children from Online Predators, was described by newspaper reviewers as “riveting” “eye-opening” and “gripping”. His writings on child abuse have appeared on the front page of the New York Times, the cover of Maclean's magazine and the OpEd page of USA Today.

He co-authored two books on outlaw motorcycle gangs, The Road to Hell: How the Biker Gangs are Conquering Canada and Angels of Death: Inside the Biker's Global Crime Empire, which was called “a devastating indictment of the gangs' drug-running and racketeering across three continents by the London Daily Mail and has been translated into several languages in seven countries.

His book Until You Are Dead: Steven Truscott's Long Ride Into History about Canada's most famous murder trial helped lead to an official re-opening of a 40-year-old case and clearing a man who was wrongly convicted.

His first book White Hoods: Canada's Ku Klux Klan, an expose of racism in Canada is cited as the main source of the subject in the encyclopedias.

He has filmed, written, directed and produced documentaries on scandals, wars and corporate intrigue in Afghanistan, Iraq, Lebanon, South Africa, Somalia, Costa Rica, Honduras, Mexico, Holland, France, England, the United States and Canada.

Sher taught journalists at CNN, the BBC, in newspapers and TV networks across Canada. He has been a guest speaker and trainer at conferences for the Investigative Reporters and Editors (IRE) and Arab Reporters for Investigative Journalism (ARIJ). He also trained in Bangladesh for FOJO and MRDI, with Syrian journalists in Turkey for Journalists for Human Rights, in Kosovo for the Canadian International Development Agency, and in the African countries of Tanzania, Ethiopia, Uganda, Ghana and Nigeria.

In 1990, Sher was president of the Canadian Association of Journalists. He now sits on the advisory board of the Investigative Journalism Bureau at the University of Toronto.

== Bibliography ==
- 1983: White Hoods: Canada's Ku Klux Klan
- 2001: "Until You Are Dead": Steven Truscott's Long Ride into History
- 2003: The Road to Hell: How the Biker Gangs are Conquering Canada co-authored by William Marsden
- 2006: Angels of Death: Inside the Bikers' Global Crime Empire co-authored by William Marsden
- 2007: One Child at a Time: the Global Fight to Rescue Children from Online Predators
- 2013: Somebody's Daughter: The Hidden Story of America's Prostituted Children and The Battle to Save Them

== Filmography ==
- 2006: Nuclear Jihad Can Terrorists get the Bomb
- 2007: The Battle for Baghdad: No Way Out
- 2008: Hunting the Predators
- 2009: Battle for the Arctic
- 2009: Love Hate and Propaganda World War II
- 2012: A Mother's Ordeal
- 2021: Ghosts of Afghanistan
- 2022: Kings of Coke

== Awards ==
- 1997: Gemini for best TV Documentary The Man who made Waves
- 2004: Arthur Ellis Award, Crime Writers of Canada, Best Non-Fiction The Road to Hell: How the Biker Gangs are Conquering Canada
- 2006: Governor General of Canada's Michener-Deacon Fellowship
- 2007 Alfred I. DuPont-Columbia University Award Nuclear Jihad Can Terrorists get the Bomb
- 2008: Arthur Ellis Award, Crime Writers of Canada Best Non Fiction One Child at a Time: the Global Fight to Rescue Children from Online Predators
- 2014: International Emmy “Made in Bangladesh” CBC The Fifth Estate (Senior Producer)
