= Good Company =

Good Company may refer to:

== Music ==
- "Good Company" (Queen song), a song on Queen's 1975 album A Night at the Opera
- "Good Company" (Jake Owen song), a song on Jake Owen's 2016 album American Love
- "Good Company", a song from Disney film Oliver & Company
- Good Company, a 2014 album by Canadian folk group The Dead South

== Other ==
- Good Company (company), a US film production company
- Good Company (TV series), an American sitcom aired in 1996
- "Good Company", a storyline in the science fiction comedy webtoon series Live with Yourself!

== See also ==
- In Good Company (disambiguation)
- "Pastime with Good Company", a song written by King Henry VIII of England
