= Ioanna Roumeliotis =

Canadian television journalist

Ioanna Roumeliotis is a Canadian television journalist, who joined the staff of the CBC Television investigative newsmagazine The Fifth Estate in 2025.

She began her career in journalism in the 1990s, writing for various newspapers before joining CBC News in 1995 as a reporter for CBMT in Montreal, and later moving to The National in 2000.

She won a Canadian Screen Award for Best News or Information Segment at the 8th Canadian Screen Awards in 2020 for "Scars Left Behind", her report on the ongoing recovery and rehabilitation of victims of the 2018 Toronto van attack. She previously received CSA nominations at the 6th Canadian Screen Awards in 2018 for her coverage of the Quebec City mosque shooting, and at the 7th Canadian Screen Awards in 2019 for "Canada's Silent Shame", her exposé on human trafficking.
