= Gillian Findlay =

Canadian television journalist

Gillian Findlay is a Canadian television journalist who has worked for the CBC and ABC.

== Biography ==
She studied history and literature at Simon Fraser University and she holds a diploma in broadcast journalism from the British Columbia Institute of Technology.

In the 1990s, Findlay worked as a foreign correspondent for CBC and later ABC, in countries such as former Yugoslavia, Somalia, Russia, South Africa, and Israel. She also worked as a Middle East correspondent for ABC.

She has been seen in such programs as CBC News: Disclosure and The Fifth Estate, and was a guest host on CBC Radio's journalism series As It Happens.

In July 2020, Findlay responded to allegations by former CBC producer Dexter Brown that she had used the n-word in meetings in April 2019 whilst discussing the screening of a documentary about racial issues. Ms. Findlay issued a statement that she had no recollection of using the n-word, but apologized in the event she had done so.

On April 14, 2023, Findlay stated on her Twitter account that, after more than 30 years, she would be leaving the CBC. In a letter to friends and colleagues, she wrote: "I am leaving the CBC because I have been unable to negotiate a remote work arrangement that is acceptable to me or in keeping with arrangements afforded peers." Finlay was scheduled to retire at the end of July 2023.
