= Sidney Leithman =

Canadian lawyer (1936–1991)

- Leithman in 1973
- Born: 14 October 1936; Montreal, Quebec, Canada
- Died: 13 May 1991 (aged 54); Mount Royal, Quebec, Canada
- Cause of death: Murder (gunshot wounds)
- Resting place: Baron de Hirsch Cemetery, Montreal
- Education: McGill University
- Occupation: Lawyer
- Years active: 1961–1991
- Known for: Defense lawyer of organized crime figures

Sidney "Sid" Leithman (14 October 1936 – 13 May 1991) was a Canadian lawyer known for representing numerous reputed organized crime figures in Montreal, Quebec. Leithman was shot dead in a murder that remains unsolved.

== Mob lawyer ==
Sidney Leithman was born in Montreal, Quebec, into a poor Jewish family, the son of Jack Leithman, a tailor and schmatta merchant, and Ethel Greenstein. He graduated with a law degree from McGill University in 1960 and, in 1961, joined the Quebec Bar Association. Leithman had a reputation as an intelligent and aggressive lawyer known for winning his cases, or at least greatly reducing the sentences imposed on the accused even if they were convicted. He became the preferred defense counsel for organized crime figures in Montreal, to such an extent that when a gangster was arrested, his first response was usually to say, "Get me Leithman!" Over the years, Leithman defended members of the Rizzuto crime family, the Cotroni crime family, the Hells Angels, the West End Gang and the Dubois brothers.

A self-confessed workaholic known for his taste in expensive cigars and cocaine, Leithman became Montreal's best known defense lawyer and a millionaire. The Canadian author Robert Knuckle wrote that Leithman was a "stylishly-dressed McGill graduate with an effusive personality" who was "well known as a wheeler-dealer among the political and commercial leaders of the city." One journalist said of Leithman: "He was a likable guy, a real wheeler-dealer." A female friend of Leithman recalled in 1991: "Well, he liked money and he liked to flash it around. When he paid for lunch he took out a wad like you wouldn’t believe." Another Leithman acquaintance said of him and his tendency to boast about his wealth: "If he'd buy you lunch, he'd make sure you knew how much it cost. If you complimented him on his tie, he'd tell you how much he paid for it."

On 18 February 1971, Leithman hosted a press conference where his client, crime boss Frank Cotroni, spoke about his arrest in Mexico the previous month. At the press conference, Leithman poured drinks for the assembled journalists. Several times he successfully defended Frank "Dunie" Ryan, the boss of the West End Gang, and was rewarded with a golden Claddagh ring by Ryan. In November 1975, Leithman, together with fellow lawyer Rolland Blais, held a press conference in which their clients, the Dubois brothers, stripped naked in front of the assembled reporters to support their claims that police had beaten them.

On 14 May 1976, a member of the West End Gang, John Slawvey, was killed in a shoot-out with Montreal police. At about 10pm on the next day, Leithman phoned André Savard, the officer who killed Slawvey, to tell him: "There's a lot of talk going on and I think you should be careful, André. There's a lot of people not happy [about the killing of Slawvey], and you can push only so much...Call this a warning if you want, but be careful and take care." Ryan was furious with Slawvey's killing – which he viewed as an execution as he insisted that Slawvey was unarmed and surrendering to the police when Savard killed him – and placed a CA$50,000 contract on the life of Savard, which Leithman was aware of. Savard denies the "execution" claim and argues that it was illogical for him to kill Slawvey, as he wanted him alive in order to pressure him to turn Crown's evidence against Ryan. After Ryan was murdered in 1984, he was replaced as West End Gang boss by Allan "The Weasel" Ross; Leithman was retained as Ross's counsel.

In 1983, Leithman was hired as the defense lawyer for Jair "El Mocho" Garcia, the Montreal agent for the Cali Cartel, and an associate of Ross'. In October of that year, Garcia was arrested and charged with importing 16 kilograms of cocaine from Colombia into Canada. At Garcia's trial in 1985, Leithman won an acquittal and Garcia returned to Colombia. Leithman also served as the lawyer for Inès Cecila Barbosa, known as La Madrina ("the Godmother"), an agent of the Cali Cartel who served as their money launderer in Montreal. In the 1980s, Leithman frequently visited Colombia, where he had connections with a number of Colombian crime figures associated with the Cali Cartel.

In 1983, the US government requested the extradition of Cotroni to face charges of conspiracy to smuggle heroin in Connecticut. Leithman represented Cotroni and maintained that the US Department of Justice had provided transcripts of Cotroni's telephone conversations and not the original tapes, which violated the rules about "best evidence" for extradition hearings. Leithman argued the extradition request should be rejected because the Department of Justice had alleged that Cotroni's references in his phone calls to buying diapers were to heroin, but Leithman noted that Cotroni really was buying diapers in bulk in the US. Cotroni believed that US diapers were much superior to Canadian diapers and he was buying diapers in bulk for one of his lieutenants, Claude Faber, who recently became a father. On this basis, Leithman argued that the extradition requests violated the Canadian Charter of Rights and Freedoms and should be rejected.

As part of his work, Leithman had befriended Claude Savoie, the chief of the Royal Canadian Mounted Police (RCMP)'s national anti-drug squad. Although it was illegal on the part of both men, Savoie started to trade information with Leithman about ongoing cases, with Leithman informing on his own clients while Savoie informed Leithman about what the RCMP knew. In 1985, Leithman told Ross via information he had learned from Savoie that one of Ross' men hiding in Florida, David Singer, was considering becoming an informer. Ross promptly had Singer killed.

In 1989, Ross gave Leithman CA$300,000 in cash and asked him to use his connections to find information about what police knew about him. In late 1989, at a meeting in Leithman's office, he introduced Savoie to Ross, where it was agreed that Savoie would sell information to Ross. Leithman served as the conduit, taking briefcases full of CA$200,000 in cash to Savoie in exchange for information about what the RCMP knew about the West End Gang.

== Murder ==
On Monday, 13 May 1991, Leithman was driving in his black Saab from his house in Mount Royal to his office. He liked to work early and that day he was preparing to make his final arguments in a case concerned several Colombian men accused of drug smuggling. At 6:48 am, at the intersection of Rockland Road and Monmouth Avenue, a car that was waiting for him suddenly pulled out onto the street, forcing Leithman to stop. A man who was standing in a telephone booth at the corner stepped out, pulled out a .45 automatic handgun and opened fire on Leithman. The killer first shot out the window and then shot Leithman four times in the head and neck. After Leithman was killed, the gunman tossed a bag of smoked ham into his car, which may have been an anti-Semitic gesture.

Found inside of Leithman's car was the unlisted phone number for Savoie, which became the first clue to the Savoie–Ross scandal that was to rock the RCMP in 1992. The murder remains unsolved, but is generally accepted that it was caused by his choice of clients. At the time of the murder, the US government was considering asking for Leithman's extradition to face charges of obstruction of justice in Florida, arguing that he had crossed the line from being a lawyer for gangsters to being a gangster himself. Leithman was laid to rest at Baron de Hirsch Cemetery in Montreal.

On 12 April 1993, it was revealed that Leithman had been working as a paid informer for the RCMP since 1985 and, in a major violation of the rules governing solicitor–client relations, had been informing on his own clients. British lawyer James Morton noted that Leithman's clients would have been enraged if they had learned that the information they had been sharing with their lawyer was being sold to the RCMP. Morton wrote that although it remains a mystery as to who had Leithman killed, it was likely that Leithman was killed because one of his clients had learned of his work as an informer.

By contrast, Canadian journalist D'Arcy O'Connor wrote that on the basis of interviews with various Mounties that Leithman was killed by one of his Colombian clients for reasons that remain unknown. Police theorized that he was assassinated by a Colombian hitman contracted by Ross and his Colombian cocaine suppliers, who feared they may be implicated by Leithman. Knuckle has argued that Barbosa ordered Leithman's murder from learning from Savoie that he was an RCMP informer. Barbosa committed suicide on 2 June 2006 by intentionally overdosing on medicinal pills, making the question impossible to answer. John Westlake, an Irish-Canadian detective with the Montreal police, has argued that corrupt constable Jorge Leite of the RCMP was in some way involved in Leithman's murder, and suggested that Leite may have been the gunman.

== Books ==
- Auger, Michel; Edwards, Peter (2004). The Encyclopedia of Canadian Organized Crime: From Captain Kidd to Mom Boucher. Toronto: McClelland & Stewart. ISBN 0771030495.
- Cédilot, André; Noël, André (2012). Mafia Inc.: The Long, Bloody Reign of Canada's Sicilian Clan. Toronto: Vintage Canada. ISBN 9780307360410.
- Edwards, Peter (1990). Blood Brothers: How Canada's Most Powerful Mafia Family Runs Its Business. Toronto: Key Porter Books. ISBN 155013213X.
- Knuckle, Robert (2007). A Master of Deception: Working Undercover for the RCMP. Renfrew: General Store Publishing House. ISBN 978-1897113660.
- Morton, James (2001). Gangland The Lawyers. London: Virgin Publishers. ISBN 9781852279417.
- O'Connor, D'Arcy (2011). Montreal's Irish Mafia: The True Story of the Infamous West End Gang. Toronto: John Wiley & Sons.
