= The Fifth Estate (TV program) =

Canadian investigative documentary series

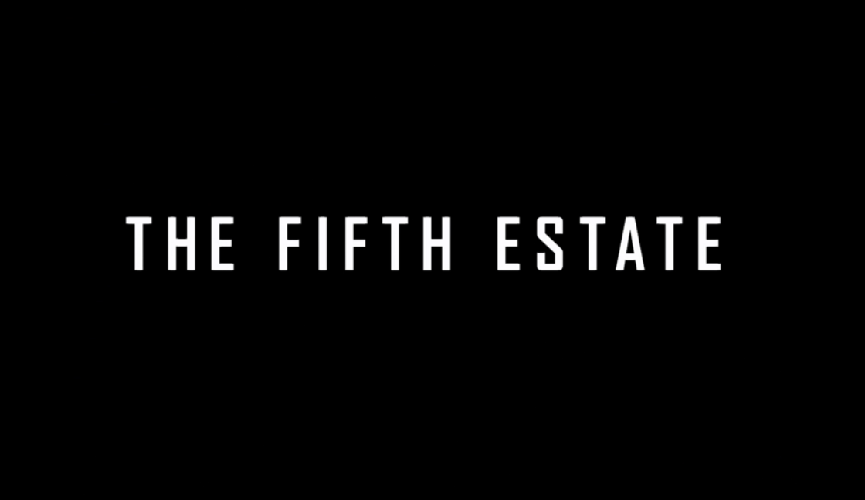
- Title card since 2017
- Genre: Investigative documentary
- Starring: Mark Kelley; Steven D'Souza; Ioanna Roumeliotis
- Country of origin: Canada
- Original language: English
- No. of seasons: 50

Production
- Executive producer: Allya Davidson
- Producer: Emmanuel Marchand
- Production location: Toronto
- Editors: Jan Silverthorne, Morna Scott-Dunne, Loretta Hicks, Christine Barclay, Anne MacRae
- Camera setup: Ousama Farag
- Running time: 60 minutes
- Production company: Canadian Broadcasting Corporation

Original release
- Network: CBC Television; CBC News Network
- Release: September 15, 1975 – present

The Fifth Estate is an English-language Canadian investigative documentary series that airs on the national CBC Television network.

The name is a reference to the term "Fourth Estate", and was chosen to highlight the program's determination to go beyond everyday news into original journalism. The program has been on the air since 16 September 1975, and its primary focus is on investigative journalism. The show was launched in 1975 by Ron Haggart. It has engaged in co-productions with the BBC, The New York Times, The Globe and Mail, the Toronto Star, and often with the PBS program Frontline.

The Fifth Estate is one of two television programs (with The Twilight Zone being the first) to win an Academy Award, a prize presented to theatrical films: Just Another Missing Kid, originally a The Fifth Estate episode, was released in theatres in the United States and won the 1982 Academy Award for Documentary Feature.

Every Thursday, The National airs a weekly segment that is based on the week's episode with Adrienne Arsenault introducing the segment.

== Journalists ==
The program is currently hosted by Mark Kelley and Steven D'Souza, with Ioanna Roumeliotis slated to join the show in spring 2025, following the retirement of longtime host Bob McKeown in fall 2024.

Other past personalities associated with the show have included:

- Bob McKeown
- Theresa Burke
- Marie Caloz
- Stevie Cameron
- Harvey Cashore
- Adrienne Clarkson
- Neil Docherty
- Gillian Findlay
- Declan Hill
- Hana Gartner
- Ron Haggart
- Bob Johnstone
- Joe MacAnthony
- Linden MacIntyre
- Sheila MacVicar
- Victor Malarek
- Eric Malling
- Habiba Nosheen
- Ian Parker
- Francine Pelletier
- Sally Reardon
- Peter Reilly
- Glenn Sarty
- David Studer
- Robin Taylor
- Warner Troyer
- Anna Maria Tremonti
- Jim Williamson
- Trish Wood

== Episodes ==
News reports aired on The Fifth Estate have included investigations into and reports about:

- 9/11 truth movement
- Death of Ashley Smith
- Airbus affair, Brian Mulroney and Karlheinz Schreiber
- William Francis Melchert-Dinkel
- Airport Security
- Al-Qaeda in Europe
- Benny Hinn
- Brendan Burke
- Brandon Crisp
- Chris Benoit ("Wrestler: Fight to the Death")
- Chuckie Akenz
- Charles Manson and the Manson Family
- Scouts Canada
- Communications Security Establishment
- David Frost and Mike Danton
- École Polytechnique massacre ("Montreal Massacre – Legacy of Pain")
- Jian Ghomeshi
- Rob Ford
- Dick Cheney
- MIM-104 Patriot and its ineffectiveness during the Gulf War as a missile defense system
- Guy Paul Morin
- Suicide of Amanda Todd
- Jane and Finch
- Noor Chowdhury
- Ontario Lottery and Gaming Corporation ("Luck of the Draw")
- Pierre Vallières
- Polygamy in Bountiful, British Columbia
- PROFUNC
- Steven Truscott
- To Sell a War
- Tunagate
- David Russell Williams
- Mark Twitchell
- Donald Trump
- Iglesia ni Cristo
- Julian Assange
- Buffy Sainte-Marie

=== Season 34 (2008–09) ===
The 2008–09 television season was the 34th season of The Fifth Estate.

| Episode | Title | Original air date | Subject |
|---|---|---|---|
| 1 | Disappearing Act | | Interview with David Reiner, a bookkeeper who turned fugitive after stealing nearly a million dollars from nonprofit day-care centres. |
| 2 | Inside Room 222 | | |
| 3 | Shadows of Doubt | | The death of Royal Military College cadet Joe Grozelle, whose disappearance in October 2003 launched a Canadian Forces National Investigation Service search. |
| 4 | The Girl in Saskatoon (Update) | | A follow-up on the unsolved murder of Alexandra Wiwcharuk, a former beauty queen in Saskatoon. |
| 5 | After the Storm | | The 2007 murder of filmmaker Helen Hill in New Orleans. |
| 6 | Overboard (Update) | | An update on the case of Laura Gainey, who was swept overboard while sailing on the Picton Castle in December 2006. |
| 7 | The Gospel of Green | | The efforts of German parliamentarian Hermann Scheer to increase his country's reliance on renewable-energy sources. |
| 8 | Head Games | | The short life expectancy of professional football players in Canada. |
| 9 | Where the Women Went | | |
| 10 | The Chess Master | | |
| 11 | A Death in the Family | | The case of Bill Mullins-Johnson, who served 12 years in prison after being wrongly convicted of the rape and murder of his 6-year-old niece. |
| 12 | Someone Got Away With Murder | January 21, 2009 | Double murder of Andrea Scherpf and Bernd Göricke |
| 13 | Strangers in Paradise | | |
| 14 | Collateral Damage | | Two men who were implicated in the 2005 shootings of four RCMP officers in Mayerthorpe, Alberta. |
| 15 | Powerless | | |
| 16 | Black Widow | | |
| 17 | The Code | | Hockey's "unwritten law" about fighting. |
| 18 | Top Gun | | The potential dangers of video-game obsession. |
| 19 | Staying Alive | | |
| 20 | The Elephant in the Room | | The Airbus affair and Karlheinz Schreiber's dealings. |
| 21 | A Fight to the Death | | |
| 22 | Amazing Grace | | |
| 23 | Bad Day in Barrhead | | |
| 24 | Life & Death in Kandahar | | The war in Afghanistan through the eyes of the medical professionals serving at Canada's trauma centre at the Kandahar Air Base. |

=== Season 36 (2010–11) ===
The 2010–11 television season was the 36th season of The Fifth Estate.

| Episode | Title | Original air date |
|---|---|---|
| 1 | Enemies of the State | October 15, 2010 |
| 2 | The Confession | October 22, 2010 |
| 3 | The Fall and Rise of Theo Fleury | October 29, 2010 |
| 4 | The Life and Death of Abdinasir Dirie | November 5, 2010 |
| 5 | Behind the Wall | November 12, 2010 |
| 6 | The Girl in the Suitcase | November 19, 2010 |
| 7 | The Legacy of Brendan Burke | November 26, 2010 |
| 8 | Presumed Dead | December 3, 2010 |
| 9 | After the Earth Shook | January 7, 2011 |
| 10 | Justice for Nadia | January 14, 2011 |
| 11 | Death of the Don | January 28, 2011 |
| 12 | WikiRebels | February 4, 2011 |
| 13 | Death at the Olympics | February 11, 2011 |
| 14 | The Devil You Know | February 18, 2011 |
| 15 | You Should Have Stayed At Home | February 25, 2011 |
| 16 | Missing | March 11, 2011 |
| 17 | Getting Off Easy | March 18, 2011 |
| 18 | My Friend the Bank Robber | March 25, 2011 |
| 19 | A Question of Innocence | April 1, 2011 |

=== Season 37 (2011–12) ===
The 2011–12 television season was the 37th season of The Fifth Estate.

| Episode | Title | Original air date | CBC viewers |
|---|---|---|---|
| 1 | Truth and Lies: The Last Days of Osama bin Laden | September 9, 2011 | 599,000 |
| 2 | Swissair 111: The Untold Story | September 16, 2011 | 775,000 |
| 3 | Gatti-vs-Gatti | September 23, 2011 | 436,000 |
| 4 | Mayday | September 30, 2011 | 482,000 |
| 5 | Colonel Gadhafi: Palace of Secrets | October 7, 2011 | 577,000 |
| 6 | True Confession | October 14, 2011 | 504,000 |
| 7 | Scout's Honour | October 21, 2011 | 567,000 |
| 8 | 'Til Death Do Us Part | October 28, 2011 | 482,000 |
| 9 | Stories from the River's Edge | November 4, 2011 | 509,000 |
| 10 | Murder, he wrote | November 18, 2011 | 535,000 |
| 11 | A Cold Case | November 25, 2011 | 612,000 |
| 12 | Holiday Hell | December 2, 2011 | 722,000 |
| 13 | Behind the Line | December 9, 2011 | 568,000 |
| 14 | Escape From Justice | January 6, 2012 | 853,000 |
| 15 | Diagnosis Murder | January 13, 2012 | 646,000 |
| 16 | The Lies People Tell | January 20, 2012 | 752,000 |
| 17 | Who's Killing the Rizzutos? | January 27, 2012 | 622,000 |
| 18 | The Wreck of the Costa Concordia | February 3, 2012 | 1,317,000 |
| 19 | The House of Shafia | February 10, 2012 | 470,000 |
| 20 | The Lost Boys | February 17, 2012 | 565,000 |
| 21 | Fearless | February 24, 2012 | 298,000 |
| 22 | Fast Break | March 2, 2012 | 203,000 |
| 23 | Time Bomb | March 9, 2012 | 895,000 |
| 24 | Lost on the Ice | March 23, 2012 | 300,400 |
| 25 | Kidnapped | April 6, 2012 | 1,200,000 |

=== Season 38 (2012–13) ===
The 2012–13 television season was the 38th season of The Fifth Estate.

| Episode | Title | Original air date | |
|---|---|---|---|
| 1 | Into the Death Zone | September 12, 2012 | Death of Canadian Shriya Shah-Klorfine on Mt. Everest |
| 2 | Kingston Pen: Secrets and Lies | September 21, 2012 | Kingston Penitentiary |
| 3 | Runaway Fighter | September 28, 2012 | Purchase of the F-35 fighter jet |
| 4 | The Widow's Web | October 5, 2012 | So-called "black widow" Melissa Ann Shepard |
| 5 | The Life and Death of Gloria Taylor | October 12, 2012 | Gloria Taylor, the first Canadian to have the right to ask for a doctor's assistance in dying |
| 6 | Whistleblowers: Moment of Truth | October 19, 2012 | The fate of well-known Canadian whistleblowers |
| 7 | Lost in the Struggle: The Next Chapter | October 26, 2012 | Return to Jane and Finch, Toronto |
| 8 | Lucky 7 | November 2, 2012 | The recovery of the stolen lottery win |
| 9 | The Elephant in the Room | November 9, 2012 | Retiring zoo elephants |
| 10 | Left for Dead | November 16, 2012 | Struggle for survival in icy waters near Baffin Island |
| 11 | Lance Armstrong: Master of Spin | November 23, 2012 | Lance Armstrong |
| 12 | Hunting Magnotta | November 30, 2012 | Double murderer Luka Magnotta and whether his gruesome crimes could have been prevented |
| 13 | Costa Concordia: The Captain's Tale | December 7, 2012 | Costa Concordia disaster |
| 14 | The Imperfect Spy | April 10, 2017 | What Jeffrey Delisle did and why |
| 15 | The Last Race | January 18, 2013 | Death of Canadian ski cross competitor Nick Zoricic in World Cup competition |
| 16 | Death in Paradise | January 25, 2013 | Unexplained tourist deaths may be linked to pesticide use |
| 17 | Target bin Laden | February 1, 2013 | Osama bin Laden |
| 18 | Crossfire | February 8, 2013 | The National Rifle Association's influence in the United States and Canada |
| 19 | The Unrepentant | February 22, 2013 | Canadian psychopaths Melbourne "Lightning" Lee, Russell Williams, Karla Homolka, and two young offenders |
| 20 | The Vanishing | March 1, 2013 | Disappearance of Wendy Ratté |
| 21 | Second Wave | March 8, 2013 | Debris from 2011 Japanese tsunami begins to reach Canadian coasts |
| 22 | Ironman | March 29, 2013 | Russ George's massive iron fertilization project off of BC's west coast |
| 23 | Mission Improbable | April 5, 2013 | Cynthia Vanier, SNC-Lavalin, and an alleged plot to smuggle Saadi Gaddafi and his family into Mexico |
| 24 | Rate My Hospital | April 12, 2013 | |

=== Season 39 (2013–14) ===
The 2013–14 television season was the 39th season of The Fifth Estate.

| Episode | Title | Original air date | Subject |
|---|---|---|---|
| 1 | The Secrets of Sugar | October 4, 2013 | |
| 2 | Made in Bangladesh | October 11, 2013 | Textile industry in Bangladesh, triggered by the 2013 Rana Plaza factory collapse |
| 3 | The Murder and the Money Trail | October 18, 2013 | |
| 4 | Elephants on Board: A Journey to Remember | October 25, 2013 | PAWS sanctuary |
| 5 | The Strange World of Julian Assange | November 1, 2013 | Julian Assange |
| 6 | The Rob Ford Story | November 8, 2013 | Rob Ford, late mayor of Toronto |
| 7 | The Sextortion of Amanda Todd | November 15, 2013 | Suicide of Amanda Todd |
| 8 | The Conspiracy Files: JFK and 9/11 | November 22, 2013 | Conspiracy theories around John F. Kennedy's assassination and 9/11 |
| 9 | The Last Great Escape | November 29, 2013 | |
| 10 | Silence of the Labs | January 10, 2013 | |
| 11 | The Man Who Hears Voices | January 17, 2014 | |
| 12 | Walk the Line | January 22, 2014 | A prominent biker cop who was accused of selling secrets to the Hell's Angels |
| 13 | Voyage of the Black Dragon | January 31, 2014 | A voyage attempted by 600 Chinese migrants to sneak into Canada in 1999. |
| 14 | Rabbi of the Pure Hearts: Inside Lev Tahor | February 28, 2014 | Lev Tahor and alleged child abuse within a Jewish community. |
| 15 | The Rise and Fall of Mike Duffy | March 7, 2014 | Mike Duffy and the Canadian Senate expenses scandal |
| 16 | Return to Paradise | March 14, 2014 | Pesticides used in a tropical resort hotel room may have killed guests in Asia. |
| 17 | Dead Enough | March 21, 2014 | Canada's varying standards for declaring death affects organ transplants |
| 18 | Your Tips, Our Stories | March 28, 2014 | Stories from viewer tips: a man deceives Canadian women into supporting him financially; the Halifax death of a young blind woman is re-examined; the worst case of small-town corruption |
| 19 | Love and the Perfect Stranger | March 28, 2014 | Markus Vuorinen, a Finnish former gameshow host who promised love to at least 10 women across Canada before being arrested on assault charges |
| 20 | The Long Way Home | March 28, 2014 | The Halifax death of a young blind woman, Holly Bartlett |
| 21 | Small Town Shakedown | March 28, 2014 | The worst case of small-town corruption: Rita Crundwell stealing millions from the town coffers in Dixon, Illinois. |

=== Season 43 (2017–18) ===
The 2017–18 television season was the 43rd season of The Fifth Estate.

| Episode | Title | Broadcast Date | Subject |
|---|---|---|---|
| 1 | Murder in Cottage Country | September 15, 2017 | Decades-old mystery over the disappearance of 4 elderly people in the Muskoka region of Ontario |
| 2 | Pit Bulls Unleashed: Should They Be Banned | September 22, 2017 | |
| 3 | The Truth Smugglers | September 29, 2017 | People in Syria who smuggle out photographs and pages of secret official documents |
| 4 | Jagmeet Singh: The Colour of Politics | October 13, 2017 | Jagmeet Singh |
| 5 | Motherisk: Tainted Tests & Broken Families | October 20, 2017 | Motherisk |
| 6 | Via Rail Terror Plot : The Inside Man | October 27, 2017 | |
| 7 | TransCanada and Keystone XL : The Money Pipeline | November 3, 2017 | TransCanada and Keystone XL Pipelines |
| 8 | The Super Scalpersh | November 10, 2017 | A Canadian super scalper, as revealed in the Paradise Papers |
| 9 | The JFK Files: The Murder of a President | November 17, 2017 | Assassination of John F. Kennedy |
| 10 | Basil Borutski and the Wilno Murders: Circle of Fear | November 24, 2017 | An investigation into the murders of three women in Wilno, Renfrew County, Ontario, and Basil Borutski, the man on trial for those crimes. |

=== Season 45 (2019–20) ===
The 2019–20 television season is the 45th season of The Fifth Estate. (Where two episodes appear in one program, a "/" is included between the episodes.)

| Episode | Title | Broadcast Date | Subject |
|---|---|---|---|
| 1 | Targeted / Is Murder In Your DNA? | September 22, 2019 | Gun lobby's fight to save assault weapons in Canada / DNA detective technique |
| 2 | When Terror Comes Home | September 29, 2019 | Plan for de-radicalizing returning ISIS fighters |
| 3 | The Forgotten / Havana Syndrome | | Stories from several women who grew up in Quebec's youth protection system / A new Canadian study into the Havana syndrome, looking into why an increasing number of Canadian and American diplomats have gotten sick in Cuba. |
| 4 | The Hood: Cops, Gangs, and a community in the crossfire | | Indigenous gangs in Regina, in one of Canada's most dangerous neighbourhoods. |
| 5 | Dear Mr. Bissonnette | | Alexandre Bissonnette, the man behind the 2017 Quebec City mosque shooting |
| 6 | My Father's Killer: Murder Mystery on Cortes Island / Wronged: Did Ashley Smith"s death end solitary confinement? | | A man's search for his father's killer and the problematic police investigation surrounding it. / The Ashley Smith inquest |
| 7 | Muskoka Murders: Closing in on the Killers | | The disappearance and presumed killing of four senior citizens—including Joan Lawrence, John Semple, John Crofts, and Ralph Grant—in Ontario's Muskoka cottage country |
| 8 | Captive: Caitlan Coleman vs. Joshua Boyle | | Kidnapping of Canadian-American couple Joshua Boyle and Caitlan Coleman in Ghazni Province, Afghanistan |
| 9 | The List: The Search For Church Secrets / Vintage Grapes: Revisiting a famous Don Cherry interview | | Survivors of clergy abuse demanding that the Roman Catholic church release secret lists of credibly-accused abusers / Revisiting an interview with Don Cherry that took place almost 3 decades ago. |
| 10 | Hockey Fight: Wives Reveal the Cost of Concussions / Sexism in Science: The Woman Who Pioneered Giraffe Research | | The wives of retired hockey enforcers demanding change from the NHL / Anne Innis Dagg, a Canadian pioneer for women's rights and a groundbreaking scientist on the behavior of giraffes. |
| 11 | Passport Babies: The Growing Shadow Industry of Birth Tourism / Confronting Hate: How Antifa Is Tracking the Extreme Right | | Birth tourism / The world of Antifa |
| 12 | The Autopsy Part One: What If Justice Got It Wrong? / The Insider: Tales From Inside the Benny Hinn Ministries | | Autopsy results in criminal cases in Alberta that may have led to miscarriages of justice, including wrongful convictions. / The worldwide influence of American-Canadian evangelist Benny Hinn |
| 13 | How Boeing Crashed: The Inside Story of the 737 Max | | The Boeing 737 MAX groundings |
| 14 | Runaway Train: Investigating a CP Rail Crash / Who Are They? Reconstructing Faces of the Dead | January 26, 2020 | The derailment of a Canadian Pacific train into the Kicking Horse River / How 15 students, 1 instructor, and an RCMP officer use forensic sculpture in an effort to identify the remains of 15 men found in Canada. |
| 15 | The Priest's Confession: What the Catholic Bishops Knew / John Connelly's Death: Family Fights for Answers | | Allegations of sexual assault among Catholic clergy in Canada / The death of University of Toronto pharmacy student John Connelly in 2001. |

=== Season 46 (2020–21) ===
The 2020–21 television season is the 46th season of The Fifth Estate. (Where two episodes appear in one program, a "/" is included between the episodes.)

| Episode | Title | Broadcast Date | Subject |
|---|---|---|---|
| 1 | Thirteen Deadly Hours: The Nova Scotia Shooting | | The April 2020 mass shooting in Nova Scotia by a man who went on a 13-hour crime spree in which he killed 22 people |
| 2 | Bitter Harvest: The Story of the Pandemic and the People Who Pick Our Food | | Government policies for protecting farm workers that Canada imports each year from abroad to grow and harvest fruits and vegetables. |
| | The Smartest Guy in the Room: Cameron Ortis and the RCMP Secrets Scandal | | How the RCMP charged Cameron Ortis, one of their own, with leaking confidential police secrets. |
| 4 | Nygard: The Secret Videos | | The December 2020 arrest of Peter Nygard, a Canadian fashion tycoon who faced charges involving sex trafficking and racketeering. |
| 5 | The Price WE Paid | | The political WE Charity scandal involving Prime Minister Justin Trudeau and the WE Charity. The episode includes an interview with WE's cofounders, Craig and Marc Kielburger. |
| 6 | Policing the Police | February 11, 2021 | How police are investigated in Canada; following the aftermath of a shooting in a small Ontario town, after one police officer shoots another. |
| 7 | Fatal Care / Sexism Within Ottawa Police | | A tragedy in an Ontario foster home, revealing problems in the for-profit child care system / Charges of sexual misconduct in the Ottawa Police Service |
| 8 | The Missing Millions / Black on Campus | February 25, 2021 | A massive case of financial fraud that cost investors and pensioners millions of dollars Three Black Canadians who claim anti-Black racism to be plaguing the hallways of higher learning. |
| 9 | Treatment or Torture / No More Tears: The Essure Legacy | | Canada's Oak Ridge institution, where mentally-ill prisoners are treated each other, and other human experiments were performed. / The fight for justice by Canadian women after having endured medical complications from Essure. |
| 10 | When Police Don't Knock / Broken Honour | | The issues with a controversial police tactic known as "dynamic entry," which is used in search of drugs, guns, and suspects / The Canadian military's attempts to combat sexual violence in its ranks. |
| 11 | The Gene Hunters / Recipe for Genius | | The Toronto Police's mining of genetic genealogy to find the killer behind cold cases, some of which are over 2 decades old / The renewed interest in the game of chess, as well as a fascination with children who show early genius for the game. |

== Awards ==
The Fifth Estate has won many awards, including Gemini Awards—among them ten for Best Information Series—numerous domestic investigative journalism awards, many New York and Columbus awards, International Emmys, and in 2000 and 2010 the Michener Award, Canada's top journalism prize, which is open to all media and has only one annual winner. A 2003 co-production with The New York Times and PBS's Frontline was recognized with the Pulitzer, Peabody, Polk, and other awards.

The Fifth Estate is one of two television programs (with The Twilight Zone being the first) to win an Academy Award, a prize presented to theatrical films: Just Another Missing Kid, originally a The Fifth Estate episode, was released in theatres in the United States and won the 1982 Academy Award for Documentary Feature.

| Award | Year | Category | Recipient | Result |
|---|---|---|---|---|
| Academy Awards | 1983 | Best Documentary, Features | John Zaritsky Episode: The Fifth Estate: Just Another Missing Kid (1981) | Winner |
| Gemini Awards | 1998 | Best Photography in an Information Program or Series | Colin Allison | Nominee |
| Gemini Awards | 1999 | Best News Information Series | David Studer and Susan Teskey | Winner |
| Gemini Awards | 1999 | Best Photography in an Information Program or Series | Colin Allison | Nominee |
| Gemini Awards | 2002 | Best Photography in an Information Program or Series | Colin Allison | Winner |
| Gemini Awards | 2003 | Best Picture Editing in an Information Program or Series | Kelly A. Morris | Nominee |
| Gemini Awards | 2004 | Best News Information Series | David Studer and Sally Reardon | Winner |
| Gemini Awards | 2004 | Best Writing in an Information Program or Series | Bob McKeown Segment: "Run For Your Life" | Winner |
| Gemini Awards | 2004 | Best Photography in an Information Program or Series | Colin Allison Segment: "Run For Your Life" | Winner |
| Gemini Awards | 2004 | Best Picture Editing in an Information Program or Series | Loretta Hicks Segment: "No Way Home" | Winner |
| Gemini Awards | 2004 | Best Direction in a News Information Program or Series | Marie Caloz Segment: "No Way Home" | Nominee |
| Gemini Awards | 2004 | Best Direction in a News Information Program or Series | Neil Docherty Segment: "Dead in the Water" | Nominee |
| Gemini Awards | 2004 | Best Direction in a News Information Program or Series | Claude Vickery Segment: "Run For Your Life" | Nominee |
| Gemini Awards | 2004 | Best Writing in an Information Program or Series | Linden MacIntyre Segment: "Death of a Beauty Queen" | Nominee |
| Gemini Awards | 2004 | Best Picture Editing in an Information Program or Series | Leslie Steven Onody Segment: "Dead in the Water" | Nominee |
| Gemini Awards | 2004 | Best Picture Editing in an Information Program or Series | Kelly A. Morris Segment: "Run For Your Life" | Nominee |
| Gemini Awards | 2004 | Best Sound in an Information/Documentary Program or Series | Joe Passeretti and Damian Kearns Segment: "Dead in the Water" | Nominee |
| Gemini Awards | 2005 | Best Direction in a News Information Program or Series | Oleh Rumak Episode: "Do You Believe in Miracles?" | Winner |
| Gemini Awards | 2005 | Best Writing in an Information Program or Series | Linden MacIntyre Episode: "War Without Borders" | Winner |
| Gemini Awards | 2005 | Best Picture Editing in an Information Program or Series | Loretta Hicks Episode: "Sticks and Stones" | Winner |
| Gemini Awards | 2005 | Best News Information Series | David Studer and Sally Reardon | Nominee |
| Gemini Awards | 2005 | Best Direction in a News Information Program or Series | Marie Caloz Episode: "First, Do No Harm" | Nominee |
| Gemini Awards | 2005 | Best Direction in a News Information Program or Series | Episode: "Sticks and Stones" | Nominee |
| Gemini Awards | 2005 | Best Direction in a News Information Program or Series | Kit Melamed Episode: "Mister Nobody" | Nominee |
| Gemini Awards | 2005 | Best Direction in a News Information Program or Series | Claude Vickery Episode: "The Girl in the Suitcase" | Nominee |
| Gemini Awards | 2005 | Best Writing in an Information Program or Series | Hana Gartner Episode: "The Canadian" | Nominee |
| Gemini Awards | 2005 | Best Writing in an Information Program or Series | Bob McKeown Episode: "Sticks and Stones" | Nominee |
| Gemini Awards | 2005 | Best Photography in an Information Program or Series | Paul Seeler Episode: "First, Do No Harm" | Nominee |
| Gemini Awards | 2005 | Best Picture Editing in an Information Program or Series | Leslie Steven Onody Episode: "War Without Borders" | Nominee |
| Gemini Awards | 2005 | Best Picture Editing in an Information Program or Series | Episode: "Do You Believe in Miracles?" | Nominee |
| Gemini Awards | 2005 | Best Host or Interviewer in a News Information Program or Series | Bob McKeown Episodes: "Bio of Dick Cheney", "Do You Believe in Miracles", and "Sticks and Stones" | Nominee |
| Gemini Awards | 2005 | Best Host or Interviewer in a News Information Program or Series | Gillian Findlay Episode: "First, Do No Harm" | Nominee |
| Gemini Awards | 2006 | Best News Information Series | David Studer, Jane Mingay, Sally Reardon, and Jim Williamson | Winner |
| Gemini Awards | 2006 | Best Writing in an Information Program or Series | Linden MacIntyre Episode: "Hail of Bullets" | Winner |
| Gemini Awards | 2006 | Best Science, Technology, Nature, Environment or Adventure Documentary Program | David Studer, Douglas Arrowsmith, Jane Mingay, and Jim Williamson Episode: "Black Dawn" | Nominee |
| Gemini Awards | 2006 | Best Sports Program or Series | David Studer, Caroline Harvey, Jane Mingay, and Jim Williamson Episode: "On the Edge of Glory" | Nominee |
| Gemini Awards | 2006 | Best Host or Interviewer in a News Information Program or Series | Gillian Findlay Episode: "Failing Jeffrey" | Nominee |
| Gemini Awards | 2006 | Best Host or Interviewer in a News Information Program or Series | Bob McKeown Episode: "Rogue Agent" | Nominee |
| Gemini Awards | 2006 | Best Writing in an Information Program or Series | Bob McKeown Episode: "Rogue Agent" | Nominee |
| Gemini Awards | 2006 | Best Writing in an Information Program or Series | Gillian Findlay Episode: "Failing Jeffrey" | Nominee |
| Gemini Awards | 2007 | Best News Information Series | David Studer and Sally Reardon | Winner |
| Gemini Awards | 2007 | Best Host or Interviewer in a News Information Program or Series | Gillian Findlay Episode: "Luck of the Draw" | Winner |
| Gemini Awards | 2007 | Best Picture Editing in an Information Program or Series | Tania White Episode: "The Good Father" | Winner |
| Gemini Awards | 2007 | Best Host or Interviewer in a News Information Program or Series | Hana Gartner Episode: "The Good Father" | Nominee |
| Gemini Awards | 2007 | Best Direction in a News Information Program or Series | Catherine Annau Episode: "The Good Father" | Nominee |
| Gemini Awards | 2007 | Best Direction in a News Information Program or Series | Tamar Weinstein Episode: "Lost in the Struggle" | Nominee |
| Gemini Awards | 2007 | Best Writing in an Information Program or Series | Gillian Findlay Episode: "Luck of the Draw" | Nominee |
| Gemini Awards | 2007 | Best Photography in an Information Program or Series | Colin Allison and Jeff Cole Episode: "Crime Pays" | Nominee |
| Gemini Awards | 2007 | Best Picture Editing in an Information Program or Series | Loretta Hicks Episode: "Lost in the Struggle" | Nominee |
| Gemini Awards | 2007 | Best Sound in an Information/Documentary Program or Series | Larry Kent, Damian Kearns, and Joe Passaretti Episode: "Road Warriors" | Nominee |
| Gemini Awards | 2008 | Best News Information Series | David Studer and Sally Reardon | Winner |
| Gemini Awards | 2008 | Best Host or Interviewer in a News Information Program or Series | Hana Gartner Episode: "The Lady Vanishes" | Winner |
| Gemini Awards | 2008 | Best Picture Editing in an Information Program or Series | Avi Lev Episode: "Overboard" | Winner |
| Gemini Awards | 2008 | Best Host or Interviewer in a News Information Program or Series | Gillian Findlay Episode: "Overboard" | Nominee |
| Gemini Awards | 2008 | Best Host or Interviewer in a News Information Program or Series | Linden MacIntyre Episode: "Bad Day in Barrhead" | Nominee |
| Gemini Awards | 2008 | Best Direction in a News Information Program or Series | Marie Caloz Episode: "Teacher's Pet" | Nominee |
| Gemini Awards | 2008 | Best Direction in a News Information Program or Series | Claude Vickery Episode: "Overboard" | Nominee |
| Gemini Awards | 2008 | Best Writing in an Information Program or Series | Gillian Findlay Episode: "Overboard" | Nominee |
| Gemini Awards | 2008 | Best Writing in an Information Program or Series | Linden MacIntyre Episode: "Brian Mulroney: The Unauthorized Chapter" | Nominee |
| Gemini Awards | 2008 | Best Photography in an Information Program or Series | Paul Seeler Episode: "Life and Death in Kandahar" | Nominee |
| Gemini Awards | 2008 | Best Sound in an Information/Documentary Program or Series | Joe Passaretti and Damian Kearns Episode: "Life and Death in Kandahar" | Nominee |
| Gemini Awards | 2010 | Best Editorial Research | Lynette Fortune (researcher) Canadian Broadcasting Corporation (production company) | Winner |
| Canadian Screen Awards | 2013 | Best Direction in a News Information Program or Series | Carmen Merrifield and Claude Vickery Episode: "Truth & Lies: The Last Days of Osama bin Laden" | Winner |
| Canadian Screen Awards | 2013 | Barbara Sears Award for Best Editorial Research | Angela Gilbert Episode: "Scout's Honour" | Winner |
| Canadian Screen Awards | 2013 | Best Direction in a News Information Program or Series | Timothy Sawa Episode: "Scout's Honour" | Nominee |
| Canadian Screen Awards | 2015 | Best News or Information Program | Tarannum Kamlani, Mark Kelley, Lysanne Louter, and Aileen McBride Episode: "Made in Bangladesh" | Winner |
| Canadian Screen Awards | 2015 | Best News or Information Series | Julian Sher and Jim Williamson | Winner |
| Canadian Screen Awards | 2015 | Best Photography in a News or Information Program, Series or Segment | John Badcock Episode: "Made in Bangladesh" | Nominee |
| Canadian Screen Awards | 2015 | Best Host or Interviewer in a News or Information Program or Series | Gillian Findlay | Nominee |
| Canadian Screen Awards | 2018 | Best Picture Editing, Documentary | Liz Rosch Episode: "The Disruptors" | Nominee |
| Canadian Screen Awards | 2019 | Barbara Sears Award for Best Visual Research | Leslie Morrison | Winner |
| Canadian Screen Awards | 2019 | Barbara Sears Award for Best Editorial Research | Timothy Sawa, Lisa Mayor, and Zander Sherman | Nominee |
| Mindset Awards | 2019 | Mindset Award for Workplace Mental Health Reporting | Mark Kelley (reporter), Timothy Sawa (producer), and Kimberly Ivany (associate producer) Episode: "Officer Down" | Winner |
| The Hillman Prize | 2019 | 2019 Canadian Hillman Prize | Harvey Cashore, Bob McKeown, Kimberly Ivany, Aileen McBride, Saman Malik, Doug Husby, and Lisa Mayor The Fifth Estate | Winner |
| Canadian Association of Journalists Awards | 2020 | Best Broadcast Feature | Gillian Findlay, Linda Guerriero, Elizabeth McMillan, Lisa Mayor, and Liz Rosch Episode: "13 Deadly Hours" | Finalist |
| Canadian Association of Journalists Awards | 2020 | JHR / CAJ Award for Human Rights Reporting | Mark Kelley, Virginia Smart, Karen Wirsig, Aileen Mcbride, and Andy Hincenbergs Episode: "Bitter Harvest" | Finalist |
| Canadian Screen Awards | 2020 | Best Picture Editing, Factual | Aileen McBride | |
| Canadian Screen Awards | 2021 | Best Picture Editing, Factual | Liz Rosch | Nominee |

== Controversies ==
=== The Savoie scandal ===
In 1992, The Fifth Estate aired an expose of Inspector Claude Savoie of the Royal Canadian Mounted Police, accusing him of being corrupt. On 21 December 1992, Savoie shot himself in his office at the RCMP's headquarters. Many felt that The Fifth Estate bore some responsibility for Savoie's suicide. Julian Sher of The Fifth Estate who worked on the Savoie story stated in 2022: "I didn't kill him, I didn't load the gun, I didn't put the gun to his head. He made his choices. I'm not responsible but if Dan and I had decided not to do the story, if we had not covered this stuff, would he be alive? He might have decided to kill himself when the RCMP (investigated him)...The lesson I learned from that is the consequences of our work. For many of the people we tell stories about, it's their lives and sometimes their deaths."

=== Libel suit ===
The CBC was successfully sued for libel over an episode that aired on 27 February 1996. Two doctors were interviewed for an episode about prescription drugs. Both doctors alleged their interviews were unfairly edited to give the false impression they were involved in kickbacks, cover-ups of patient deaths and other disreputable activities. Cardiologist Martin Myers asked for an apology plus $25,000, while researcher Frans Leenen asked for an apology plus $10,000. The CBC opted to fight the charges in court. The doctors ultimately prevailed. Myers was awarded $200,000, plus interest and costs, while Leenen won $950,000, plus interest and costs that could total over $2 million, a record for Canadian libel. The CBC has no libel insurance. Judges in both cases ruled that journalists at The Fifth Estate had twisted the facts and acted with malice, with one writing in his decision; "this was sensationalistic journalism of the worst sort and should serve as an embarrassment to this so-called 'flagship' investigative programme." The episode's host Trish Wood, producer Nicholas Regush, the researcher and executive producer David Studer were assessed punitive and aggravated damages.

=== Iglesia ni Cristo ===
The CBC and The Fifth Estate were sued in February 2019 by the Iglesia Ni Cristo after officials said one of the show's broadcasts defamed their church, calling the show "slanderous" and acting "without evidence." CBC News responded by stating they stand behind the story.

The episode in question, "Church of Secrets", which aired on 11 November 2018 and was hosted by Bob McKeown, detailed the controversies surrounding the church, including accusations of financial irregularities, kidnapping, and the murder of a Canadian man. In particular, McKeown interviewed the widow of a murder victim allegedly killed by INC members after a series of verbal altercations, as well as following the story of excommunicated ministerial worker Lowell Menorca II, who sought refugee status in Canada. The news crew also attempted for and were denied an interview with Eduardo V. Manalo after an event in Sacramento. During the attempt for an interview, their vehicle's tires were slashed, which McKeown suspected was an act of intimidation by INC, though an INC member denied the allegation.
