= In Good Company (Kevin Crawford album) =

Studio album by Kevin Crawford
- Released: April 3, 2001
- Genre: Celtic
- Length: 58:35
- Label: Green Linnet Records

Kevin Crawford chronology
| 'D' Flute Album (1995) | In Good Company (2001) | A Breath of Fresh Air (2007) |

Professional ratings
Review scores
| Source | Rating |
|---|---|
| Allmusic | link |

In Good Company is solo album by Kevin Crawford. It was released in 2001 on Green Linnet Records, and is Kevin's second solo release. The tracks on this album are primarily flute and fiddle duets, with the fiddlers among those Kevin most admires.

== Musicians ==
Kevin Crawford (D concert, B-flat, and E-flat flutes, low whistle)
Seán Smyth (fiddle)
James Cullinan (fiddle)
Frankie Gavin (fiddle)
Martin Hayes (viola)
Tony Linnane (fiddle)
Tommy Peoples (fiddle)
Manus McGuire (fiddle)
Mick Conneely (fiddle, bouzouki)
Conor Tully (fiddle)
Arty McGlynn (guitars)
Jim Higgins (bodhrán)
Carl Hession (keyboards)

== Track listing ==
1. Tommy Peoples' / The Long Drop / Callaghan's (reels) 3:06
2. Young Tom Ennis / The Mouse In The Mug (jigs) 3:18
3. Tae The Beggin' / Alice's Reel (reels) 2:40
4. Coilsfield House (slow air) 4:33
5. The Bag Of Spuds / Matt Peoples (reels) 3:13
6. Strike The Gay Harp / Jim O'Connor's (jigs) 3:01
7. Jim O'Reilly's / Doonagore / The Bell Harbor Reel (reels) 3:34
8. Sliabh Geal gCua (slow air) 3:18
9. The First Pint / The Flying Wheelchair / The Humours Of Derrycrossane (jigs) 3:25
10. John Carty's / The Stolen Reel / Feeding The Birds (reels) 3:48
11. The Rolling Waves / Finbar Dwyer's Favorite (jigs) 2:52
12. The Banks Of The Suir / Mama's Pet (air and reel) 4:18
13. The High Road To Glin / The Hard Road To Travel / Paddy Fahey's (reels) 3:19
14. Brian O'Lynn / Cailleach A Shúsa (jigs) 3:54
15. Tommy's Mazurkas (mazurkas) 3:32
16. Farewell To Jim / That's More Of It (jigs) 3:13
17. Ashmolean House / The Kilcloon / Out On The Road (reels) 3:31
