= Nicholas Regush =

Canadian journalist and author

Nicholas M. Regush (June 15, 1946 - October 14, 2004) was a Canadian journalist and author. He produced medical features for World News Tonight with Peter Jennings. He was nominated for an Emmy.

== Books ==
- The Drug Addiction Business (Dial, 1971)
- Condition Critical: Canada’s Health-Care System (Macmillan Canada, 1988)
- Safety Last: The Failure of the Consumer Health Protection System (Key Porter, 1993)
- The Virus Within: A Coming Epidemic (Dutton Books, 2000)
