= Robert Knuckle =

Canadian author, actor and playwright

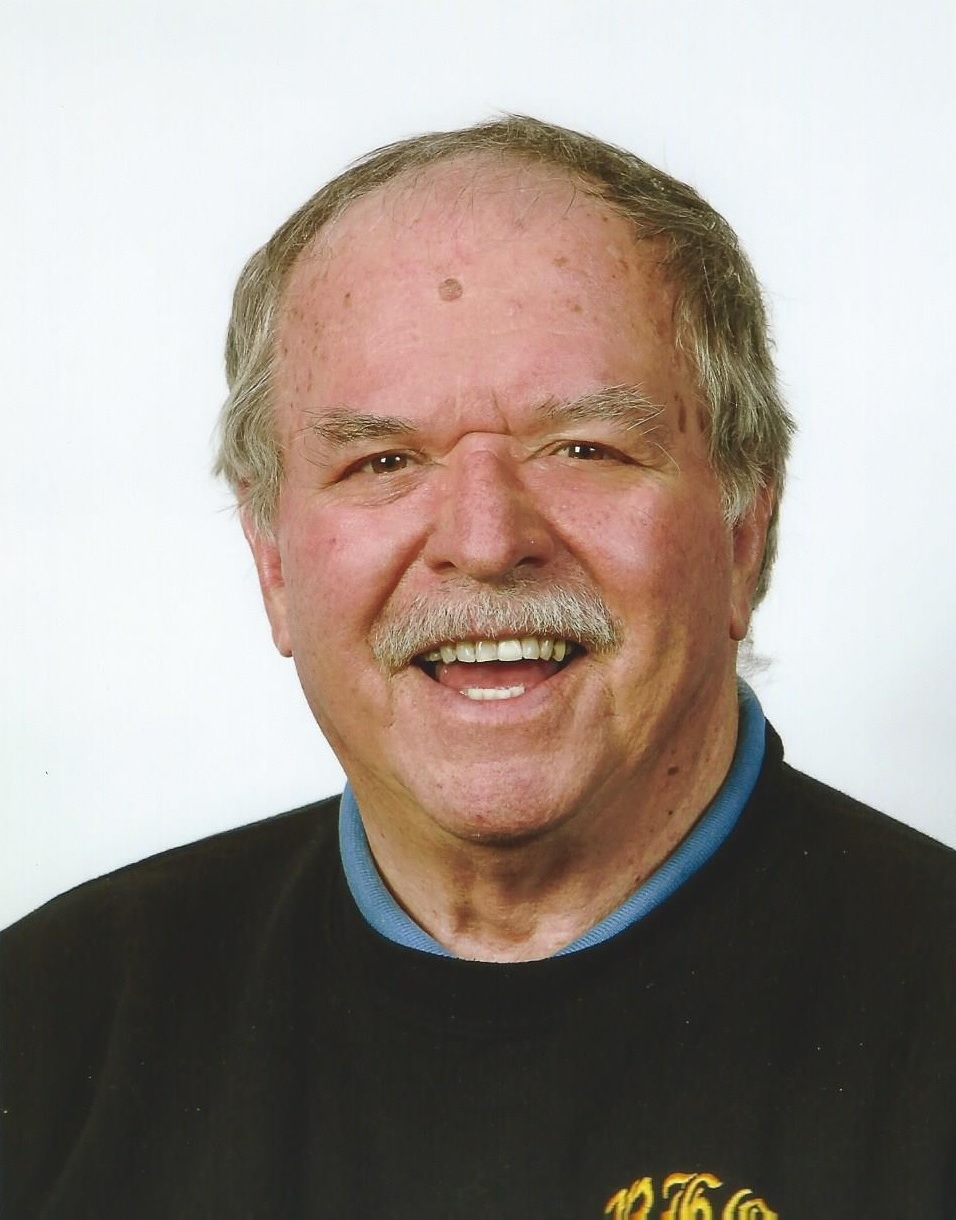
- Robert Knuckle, 2014
- Born: Robert Gordon Knuckle; February 15, 1935; Windsor, Ontario, Canada
- Died: March 3, 2019 (aged 84)
- Education: University of Windsor
- Occupations: Author, playwright, actor, public speaker
- Spouse: Elizabeth Anne Myles (1962-present)
- Children: Richard; Laura; Mark; Kelly

Robert Gordon Knuckle (February 15, 1935 – March 3, 2019) was a best-selling Canadian author, actor and playwright. He was a member of the Playwrights Guild of Canada. Knuckle was an educator for thirty-five years before he started writing full-time in 1992. He was an ACTRA award-winning author of ten books and two booklets.

Most of his books are about true crime and/or tales of the Royal Canadian Mounted Police who invested him as an honorary life member of their veterans association. He has also written for the stage, television, radio, and cinema. Nine of his thirteen-stage plays have been produced at major venues in Canada, USA, and in Europe, including the Edinburgh Fringe Festival. One of his true-crime books has been adapted into a movie which is presently in pre-production in Los Angeles.

He was a contributing researcher with Encyclopedia Titanica, specializing in Canada's role in retrieving the Titanic bodies from the sea and their burials in three Halifax graveyards.

Knuckle was also a prolific public speaker who has addressed over 200 service clubs. His topics included presentations about his books and plays and include a power-point presentation on Canada and the Titanic which deals with the aftermath of the Titanic tragedy.

== Education and early career ==
Knuckle acted and wrote sports columns in high school and university. After graduating from the University of Windsor, he earned his M. Ed. from the Ontario Institute for Studies in Education at the University of Toronto. He then pursued a lengthy career in education as an English and Latin teacher and high school administrator in Hamilton, Ontario. He also coached basketball and football in several high schools and at McMaster University in Hamilton. Upon retiring from education he became the general manager of the Hamilton Skyhawks of the World Basketball League. When that league folded in 1992, Knuckle began to write full-time. In 1984, while engaged as a vice-principal, he and his writing partner Gordon Carruth, a Hamilton Secondary School principal, wrote a play about the life of fabled National Football League (NFL) coach Vince Lombardi entitled I Am Not a Legend. It became very successful playing in Hamilton; Toronto; Windsor; Coventry, England; Edinburgh, Scotland; Lahr, Germany and Green Bay, Wisconsin. I Am Not a Legend was also televised and aired on ESPN in the USA. Knuckle and Carruth also adapted their Legend script for CBC Radio for which they both won ACTRA Awards for writing. In all these various productions of Legend Knuckle played the role of Vince Lombardi.

== Writing credits ==
- 1984: I Am Not A Legend - the story of football coaching legend Vince Lombardi that shows the "Human side of the gridiron legend" and is described as a surprise winner.
- 1990: The Trial of the 24th Infantry - a stage play written with Gordon Carruth that is based on the riot of the all-black United States 24th Infantry at Houston, Texas in 1917. This play was work-shopped by the Negro Ensemble Company in New York City.
- 1992: Nothing to Lose - a screenplay for Earl Owensby Studios, Shelby, North Carolina. This is a tale of two old and sickly war veterans who get revenge for the murder of one of their granddaughters.
- 1994: In the Line of Duty; The Honour Roll of the RCMP since 1873 (450 pages) - a compendium that chronicles the lives and deaths of all the members of the Royal Canadian Mounted Police killed in the line of duty.
- 1996: The Flying Bandit, Bringing Down Canada's Most Daring Armed Robber - a true crime book set in Ontario based on the life of Gilbert Galvan, an escaped American convict who flew across Canada from Vancouver to Halifax robbing fifty-nine banks and jewelry stores of over two million dollars. The book was adapted into a feature film in 2022 titled Bandit
- 1997: Beyond Reason, The Murder of a Mountie - a Canadian best-selling true crime book based on the RCMP pursuit of Canada's version of Bonnie and Clyde. This lawless couple cut a wide swath of crime across Canada that culminated with a killing in Calgary and ended with a violent, lethal gunfight and hostage-taking in Virden, Manitoba.
- 1998: Murder at Eglinton Square, The RCMP and Toronto Police Solve a Violent, Baffling Case - a true crime book about three thugs who murdered a man in Toronto and were eventually caught by exemplary Canadian police work that ranged from Ontario to Vancouver Island to Montreal.
- 1999: The Lovenest - a stage comedy that was professionally work-shopped in Toronto by Marlene Smith, the Canadian producer of Cats and produced for a two-week run with GOYA Productions in Ottawa.
- 2000: Molly of the Mounties, The Story of a Horse with Courage - an illustrated book for children to age twelve. This is the fictional story of a frail foal born at the RCMP stud farm in Pakenham, Ontario who tries valiantly to make the RCMP Musical Ride. Selected as "Our Choice" by the Canadian Children's Book Centre.
- 2002: Black Jack: America’s Famous Riderless Horse - the story of Black Jack who escorted 1,000 military burials at Arlington National Cemetery and served as the riderless horse in the funeral processions of Presidents Kennedy, Hoover, Johnson and General Douglas MacArthur. It is the endearing tale of a common and cantankerous cavalry mount that became the most illustrious horse in the history of the U.S. Army.
- 2003: Vaudeville - a musical comedy written with Gordon Carruth that played a two-week run at Ottawa's Centrepoint Theatre in October, 2003.
- 2004: True Crime and Espionage - two theme booklets written for an international educational project entitled Learning Through Literacy.
- 2005: In the Line of Duty, Volume II, From Fort MacLeod to Mayerthorpe (333 pages) - a companion to Volume I that chronicles the lives and deaths of the members of the RCMP killed in the line of duty from the inception of the Force to the tragedy at Mayerthorpe, Alberta in 2005.
- 2006: A Master of Deception: Working Undercover for the RCMP - a Canadian best-seller based on the life of Staff Sergeant Carl MacLeod whose career with the RCMP included dangerous, covert assignments where he infiltrated the Mafia, Colombian drug cartels, and Asian Triads.
- 2007: The Last Confession of Henry VIII - a stage drama that received its first public reading in Hamilton, Ontario at Christ's Church Cathedral in January, 2008.
- 2008: Strange Gods - a stage drama that was produced by GOYA Productions at Centrepoint Theatre in Ottawa in April, 2010.
- 2009: The Mayerthorpe Story: From Ambush to Aftermath - a Canadian best-seller about the 2005 incident at Mayerthorpe, Alberta where four RCMP officers were murdered by James Roszko. The book also covers the subsequent capture and imprisonment of two young men who were convicted as parties to this crime known as Canada's worst police mass killing.
- 2010: Breaking the Silence - a stage drama, factually based on clerical sexual abuse and its cover-up in the Roman Catholic Diocese of Stockton, California.
- 2011: The War of 1812 - An Inquiry - a stage drama that was produced for ten performances at the Players’ Guild of Hamilton in November, 2012. This play presents a review of events in southwestern Ontario during the War of 1812 that The Hamilton View says has great production value.
- 2012: Dundas, 1814 - a fictional stage drama based on historical fact that was scheduled for production in March, 2014 but, as yet, is unproduced.
- 2013: Hemingway and his Women - a stage drama that examines the professionally successful but personally tragic life of Ernest Hemingway. This play was produced for eight performances at the Dundas Little Theatre in May, 2014. Hemingway and his Women was also scheduled for production at the Winter Garden Theatre in Toronto in April, 2015.
- 2014: The Execution of Eddie Slovik - a stage drama about the only U.S. soldier executed for desertion from 1865 until this very day. Produced for a two-week run at Dundas Little Theatre in May, 2015.
- 2017: Black Jack's Best Friend - an illustrated children's book based on facts about a young girl's love for Black Jack, the common but difficult cavalry mount that became the most famous horse in the history of the U.S. Army.
- 2017: Jackie Gleason and Friends - a stage drama about the complex life of Jackie Gleason and his relationship with Art Carney, Audrey Meadows and Joyce Randolph. Produced for a three-week run at The Pearl Company in Hamilton, Ontario in November, 2017.
