= 2013 Canadian honours =

Canadian government recognitions

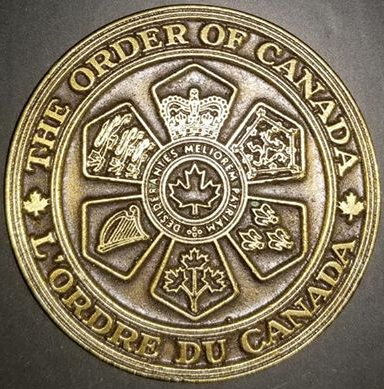
The Seal of the Order of Canada

The following are the appointments to various Canadian Honours of 2013. Usually, they are announced as a part of the New Year and Canada Day celebrations and are published within the Canada Gazette. This follows the custom set out within the United Kingdom which publishes its appoints of various British Honours for New Year's and for the monarch's official birthday. However, instead of the midyear appointments announced on Victoria Day, the official birthday of the Canadian Monarch. This custom has been transferred with the celebration of Canadian Confederation and the creation of the Order of Canada.

However, as the Canada Gazette publishes appointment to various orders, decorations and medals, either Canadian or from Commonwealth and foreign states, this article will reference all Canadians so honoured during the 2013 calendar year.

Provincial Honours are not listed within the Canada Gazette, however they are listed within the various publications of each provincial government. Provincial honours are listed within the page.

== The Order of Canada ==
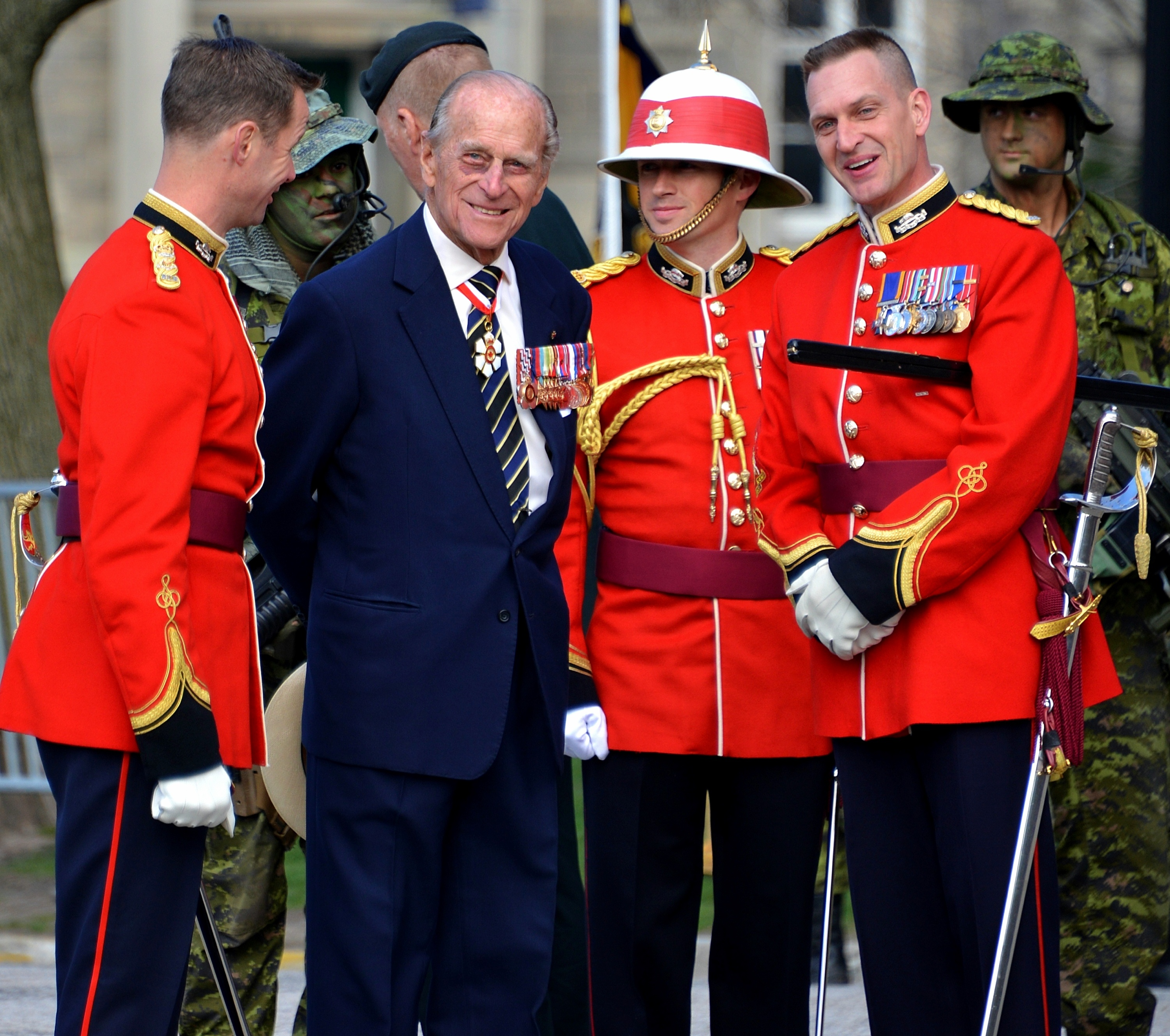
His Royal Highness The Prince Philip, Duke of Edinburgh, on his first wearing of his insignia as an Extraordinary Companion of the Order of Canada

=== Extraordinary Companion of the Order of Canada ===
- His Royal Highness The Prince Philip, Duke of Edinburgh, His Majesty's Privy Counsel for Canada, the Order of the Garter, the Order of the Thistle, the Order of Merit, the Order of the British Empire, the Order of New Zealand, the Queen's Service Order, the Order of Australia, the Order of Logohu, C.C., C.M.M., C.D., Aide de camp.

=== Companions of the Order of Canada ===
Undress ribbon of a Companion of the Order of Canada

- Louise Charron, C.C.
- L. Jacques Ménard, C.C., O.Q. - this is a promotion within the Order

=== Honorary Officers of the Order of Canada ===
Undress ribbon of an Officer of the Order of Canada

- Ronnie Hawkins, O.C.
- Bramwell Tovey, O.C.

=== Officers of the Order of Canada ===
- Arnold Boldt, O.C.
- Paul G. Cherry, O.C.
- The Honourable Sheila Copps, P.C., O.C.
- Julie M. Cruikshank, O.C.
- The Honourable Kenneth Wayne Dryden, P.C., O.C.
- Phil Fontaine, O.C., O.M.
- Paul-André Fortier, O.C.
- Michael Fullan, O.C.
- Colonel John Alan Gardam, O.C., O.M.M., M.S.M., C.D. (Retired)
- Scott Griffin, O.C.
- Jean Grondin, O.C.
- Michael Franklin Harcourt, O.C.
- Clyde Hertzman, O.C.
- Bonnie Sherr Klein, O.C.
- Veronica Lacey, O.C.
- Alain Lemaire, O.C.
- Laurent Lemaire, O.C.
- Michel Lemieux, O.C.
- Roderick Alexander Macdonald, O.C.
- M. G. Venkatesh Mannar, O.C.
- Roald Nasgaard, O.C.
- Victor Pilon, O.C., R.V.M.
- Donald Ross, O.C.
- John D. Ross, O.C.
- Danièle Sauvageau, O.C., M.S.C.
- David W. Scheifele, O.C.
- Ronald P. Schlegel, O.C.
- Rosemary Sullivan, O.C.
- Rachel Thibeault, O.C.
- The Honourable Brian Tobin, P.C., O.C.
- Ian Hugh Wallace, O.C.
- Lise Watier, O.C., O.Q. - this is a promotion within the Order
- Richard Waugh, O.C.
- Anthony Belcourt, O.C.
- Françoise Bertrand, O.C., C.Q.
- Dempsey Bob, O.C.
- William Breukelman, O.C.
- Robert Bringhurst, O.C.
- The Honourable Alexander B. Campbell, P.C., O.C.
- J. Edward Chamberlin, O.C.
- Denise Chong, O.C.
- Murray Costello, O.C.
- Frances Cutler, O.C.
- Jacqueline Desmarais, O.C., G.O.Q. - This is a promotion within the Order
- Nigel Fisher, O.C., O.Ont., M.S.C.
- Céline Galipeau, O.C., O.Q.
- Margie Gillis, O.C., C.Q. - This is a promotion within the Order
- John Ross Grace, O.C.
- Paul Gross, O.C.
- Michal Hornstein, O.C., G.O.Q. - This is a promotion within the Order
- Thomas J. Hudson, O.C.
- Patrick Lane, O.C.
- Carole Laure, O.C.
- Joseph Macerollo, O.C.
- John H. McArthur, O.C.
- Marnie McBean, O.C., M.S.M.
- Deepa Mehta, O.C., O.Ont.
- Arnold M. Noyek, O.C.
- David Edward Smith, O.C.
- John P. Smol, O.C.
- Robert Brent Thirsk, O.C., O.B.C.
- Roger F. Tomlinson, O.C. - This is a promotion within the Order
- Frederick James Wah, O.C.
- Dafydd Rhys Williams, O.C.
- Salim Yusuf, O.C.
- Luc Beauregard, O.C., C.Q.- This is a promotion within the Order

=== Members of the Order of Canada ===
Undress ribbon for a Member of the Order of Canada

- William John Aide, C.M.
- Garnet Angeconeb, C.M.
- René Angélil, C.M., O.Q.
- George William Archibald, C.M.
- Mitchell A. Baran, C.M.
- Andrew Barrie, C.M.
- Gaston Bellemare, C.M., O.Q.
- Warren T. Blume, C.M.
- Michael J. Brown, C.M.
- Stevie Cameron, C.M.
- John Cassaday, C.M.
- James K. M. Cheng, C.M.
- Bruce Clemmensen, C.M.
- Rebecca J. Cook, C.M.
- Jane Coop, C.M.
- Dennis Covill, C.M.
- Charmaine A. Crooks, C.M.
- Alban D'Amours, C.M., G.O.Q.
- Lorraine Desmarais, C.M.
- Beverley Diamond, C.M.
- Kildare Dobbs, C.M., O.Ont.
- James Durrell, C.M.
- Murray W. Enkin, C.M.
- Michael Enright, C.M.
- Janice Clare Filmon, C.M., O.M.
- Geoffrey D. Green, C.M.
- Albert Greer, C.M.
- Dana W. Hanson, C.M.
- Paul Henderson, C.M.
- Elmer Hildebrand, C.M., O.M.
- Martin Hunter, C.M.
- Harold Kalant, C.M.
- Harold Kalman, C.M.
- Elsie Kawulych, C.M., A.O.E.
- Janice MacKinnon, C.M., S.O.M.
- Leo MacNeil, C.M.
- David J. Magee, C.M.
- Fred V. Martin, C.M.
- Howard McCurdy, C.M., O.Ont.
- Claude Montmarquette, C.M.
- Hiroshi Nakamura, C.M.
- Jacqueline Oland, C.M.
- Marina Orsini, C.M.
- Jocelyn Palm, C.M.
- Stephen James Ralls, C.M.
- Heather Maxine Reisman, C.M.
- Angèle Rizzardo, C.M.
- Edward Sydney Schwartz, C.M.
- Joseph Shannon, C.M.
- Brigitte Shim, C.M.
- Linda Silver Dranoff, C.M.
- A. Howard Sutcliffe, C.M.
- James Bruce Ubukata, C.M.
- Jagannath Wani, C.M.
- Beverley Wybrow, C.M.
- Toyoshi Yoshihara, C.M.
- Elizabeth Baird, C.M.
- David Ross Beatty, C.M., O.B.E.
- Mary Boyd, C.M.
- Reuven P. Bulka, C.M.
- Paul J. J. Cavalluzzo, C.M., O.Ont.
- Édith Cloutier, C.M., C.Q.
- Shelagh Day, C.M.
- Nathalie Des Rosiers, C.M., O.Ont.
- Clare Drake, C.M., A.O.E.
- N. Murray Edwards, C.M.
- Louise Forand-Samson, C.M., O.Q.
- Gaétan Gervais, C.M.
- Paul Gobeil, C.M.
- Edward S. Goldenberg, C.M.
- Jacques Lacombe, C.M., C.Q.
- Sylvain Lafrance, C.M.
- Diane Lamarre, C.M.
- Bernard Lucht, C.M.
- Allister MacGillivray, C.M.
- Patricia Martens, C.M.
- Leslie McDonald, C.M.
- Heather Anne Menzies, C.M.
- Diane Morrison, C.M.
- Vice-Admiral Lawrence Murray, C.M., C.M.M., C.D. (Retired)
- Monica Patten, C.M.
- Léa Pool, C.M.
- Ross Porter, C.M.
- Alison Prentice, C.M.
- Barbara Reid, C.M., O.Ont.
- Michel Ringuet, C.M., C.Q.
- Kelly Russell, C.M.
- Anne M. Sado, C.M.
- Marjorie-Anne Sauder, C.M.
- Elexis Schloss, C.M.
- Gilbert Sicotte, C.M.
- Robert Silverman, C.M.
- Vaclav Smil, C.M.
- Jodi White, C.M.
- William J. Young, C.M.

=== Termination of appointments within the Order of Canada ===
- Garth Howard Drabinsky
- Camille Limoges
- Bernard Norman Barwin

== Order of Military Merit ==
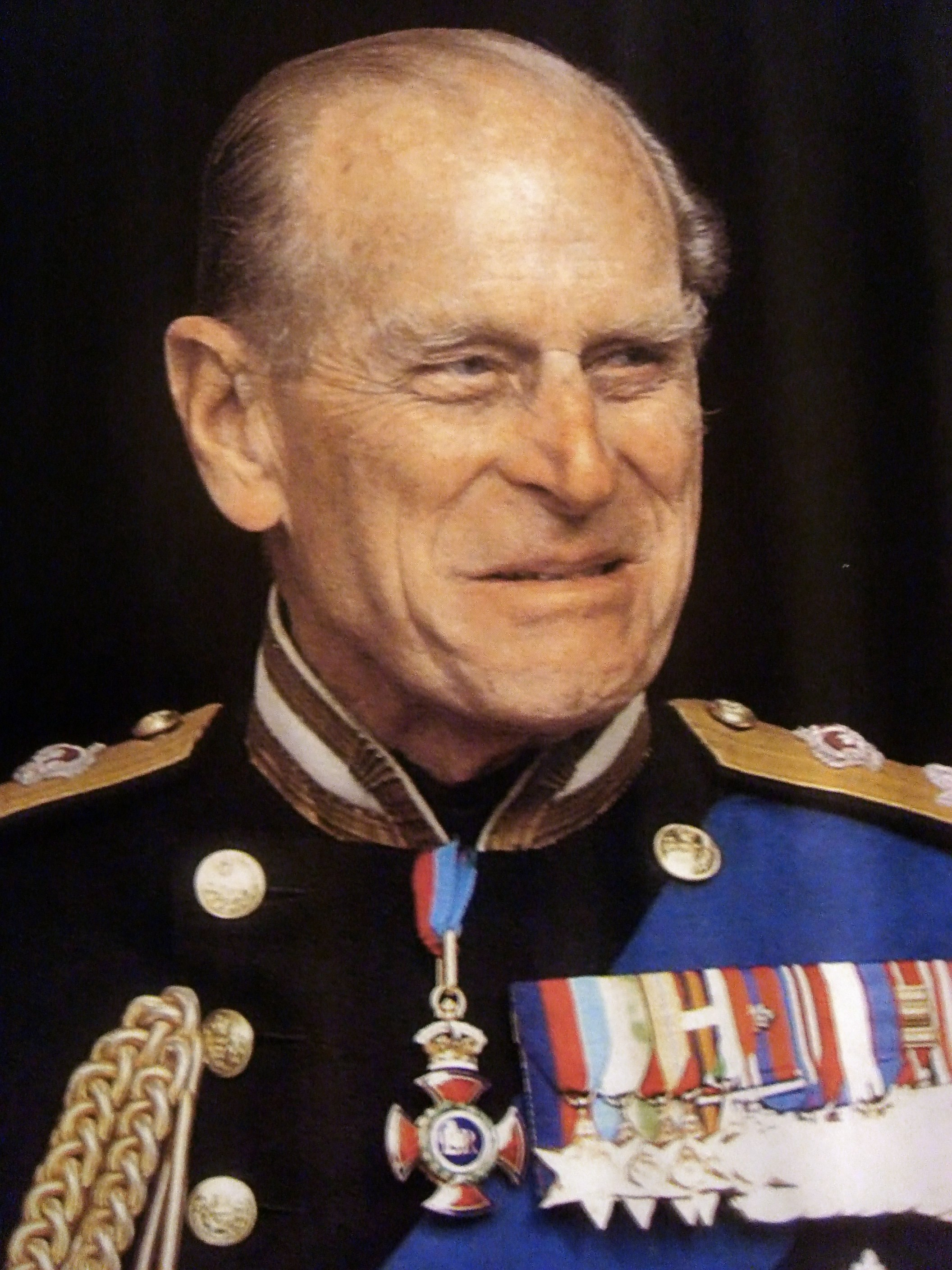
Admiral, His Royal Highness The Prince Philip, Duke of Edinburgh, Extraordinary Commander of the Order of Military Merit

=== Extraordinary Commander of the Order of Military Merit ===
- Admiral, His Royal Highness The Prince Philip, Duke of Edinburgh, P.C., K.G., K.T., O.M., G.B.E., O.N.Z., Q.S.O., A.C., G.C.L., C.C., C.M.M., C.D., A.D.C., R.C.N.

=== Commanders of the Order of Military Merit ===
Undress ribbon for a Commander of the Order of Military Merit

- Major-General Robert Pierre Félix Bertrand, C.M.M., C.D.
- Major-General Joseph Aimé Jean Yvan Blondin, C.M.M., C.D. (this is a promotion within the Order)
- Major-General Alan John Howard, C.M.M., M.S.M., C.D.
- Major-General Ian Charles Poulter, C.M.M., C.D. (this is a promotion within the Order)
- Major-General Joseph Marius Christian Rousseau, C.M.M., C.D.
- Rear-Admiral Andrew Mark Smith, C.M.M., C.D. (this is a promotion within the Order)
- Rear-Admiral Jennifer Jane Bennett, C.M.M., C.D. (this is a promotion within the Order)
- Rear-Admiral Maurice Frank Ronald Lloyd, C.M.M., C.D.
- Major-General Erik Nicolas Matern, C.M.M., C.D.
- Major-General Steven Patrick Noonan, C.M.M., M.S.C., C.D.
- Rear-Admiral Mark Arnold Gordon Norman, C.M.M., C.D.
- Lieutenant-General Alain Parent, C.M.M., C.D. (this is a promotion within the Order)

=== Officers of the Order of Military Merit ===
Undress ribbon for an Officer of the Order of Military Merit

- Brigadier-General Paul Bury, O.M.M., C.D.
- Brigadier-General Anthony Thomas Stack, O.M.M., C.D.
- Colonel Donald Kirby Abbott, O.M.M., C.D.
- Colonel Jamieson Cade, O.M.M., M.S.M., C.D.
- Captain(N) Marie Elizabeth Cyd Courchesne, O.M.M., C.D.
- Captain(N) Joseph Pierre Gilles Couturier, O.M.M., C.D.
- Colonel Joseph Pierre Hervé Hercule Gosselin, O.M.M., C.D.
- Colonel Omer Henry Lavoie, O.M.M., M.S.C., C.D.
- Colonel Gregory David Loos, O.M.M., C.D.
- Colonel Guy Joseph Maillet, O.M.M., C.D.
- Colonel Pierre Ruel, O.M.M., C.D.
- Colonel Joseph Sylvain Sirois, O.M.M., C.D.
- Lieutenant-Colonel Sean Thomas Boyle, O.M.M., C.D.
- Lieutenant-Colonel Daniel Allan Farris, O.M.M., C.D.
- Commander Stephen Edwards Irwin, O.M.M., C.D.
- Lieutenant-Colonel Telah Sybil Morrison, O.M.M., C.D.
- Lieutenant-Colonel John Vincent Pumphrey, O.M.M., C.D.
- Lieutenant-Colonel Darlene Olga Quinn, O.M.M., C.D.
- Lieutenant-Colonel Gilles Maurice Sansterre, O.M.M., C.D.
- Lieutenant-Commander Luke Dolphis Charbonneau, O.M.M., C.D. (COATS)
- Major Marjorie Coakwell, O.M.M., C.D.
- Major Michael Thomas Fawcett, O.M.M., C.D.
- Major Raymond Joseph Stockermans, O.M.M., C.D.
- Commander John Jeffrey Charles Agnew, O.M.M., C.D.
- Lieutenant-Colonel Kenneth Freeman Butterworth, O.M.M., M.S.M., C.D.
- Brigadier-General Bernard Blaise Cathcart, O.M.M., C.D.
- Brigadier-General Michael Raymond Dabros, O.M.M., C.D.
- Commander Wayne Joseph Dipersio, O.M.M., C.D.
- Brigadier-General Joseph Richard Giguère, O.M.M., M.S.M., C.D.
- Major Luc Joseph Girouard, O.M.M., C.D.
- Colonel Patrick Kevin Gleeson, O.M.M., C.D.
- Major Patrick Shawn Cosgrave Heebner, O.M.M., C.D.
- Lieutenant-Colonel Michael Shane Holder, O.M.M., C.D.
- Captain(N) Raymond Liang-chiyu Kao, O.M.M., C.D.
- Major Robert William Dunbar MacKay, O.M.M., C.D.
- Colonel Alexander Donald Meinzinger, O.M.M., M.S.M., C.D.
- Colonel Samuel Michel Michaud, O.M.M., M.S.M., C.D.
- Captain(N) Joseph Alexandre Simon Page, O.M.M., C.D.
- Colonel Jacques Paul Robert Prévost, O.M.M., M.S.M., C.D.
- Lieutenant-Colonel Harjit Sajjan, O.M.M., C.D.
- Lieutenant-Commander Lorinda Mae Semeniuk, O.M.M., C.D.
- Colonel Kristiana Margit Stevens, O.M.M., C.D.
- Lieutenant-Colonel Joseph Armand Christian St-Pierre, O.M.M., C.D.
- Colonel Lowell Earl Thomas, O.M.M., C.D.
- Captain Kenneth Charles Toomey, O.M.M., C.D.
- Colonel Richard Turner Witherden, O.M.M., M.B., C.D.

=== Members of the Order of Military Merit ===
Undress ribbon for a Member of the Order of Military Merit

- Major Joseph Eugène Vincent Michael Marc Moo Sang, M.M.M., C.D.
- Captain Lorne Joseph André Doucet, M.M.M., C.D.
- Lieutenant(N) Linda Anne Forward, M.M.M., C.D.
- Captain Nathalie Marie Mercer, M.M.M., C.D.
- Captain Tony Pépin, M.M.M., C.D.
- Captain Réjean Richard, M.M.M., C.D.
- Captain Leo Richard Snook, M.M.M., C.D.
- Captain Jonathan Burnside Utton, M.M.M., C.D.
- Captain Edwin Grant Whittla, M.M.M., C.D.
- Lieutenant Wayne Denis Forster, M.M.M., C.D.
- Lieutenant Horace Francis Lane, M.M.M., C.D. (Canadian Ranger)
- Chief Warrant Officer Wayne Alan Bartlett, M.M.M., M.S.C., C.D.
- Chief Warrant Officer Haley Joseph Bransfield, M.M.M., C.D.
- Chief Warrant Officer Bernard Joseph Jacques Caron, M.M.M., C.D.
- Chief Warrant Officer Joseph Marcel Chiasson, M.M.M., C.D.
- Chief Warrant Officer Joseph Claude Chouinard, M.M.M., C.D.
- Chief Petty Officer 1st Class Leonard James Denning, M.M.M., C.D.
- Chief Warrant Officer Karl Richard Joseph Ellis, M.M.M., C.D.
- Chief Petty Officer 1st Class David Warren Hart, M.M.M., C.D.
- Chief Warrant Officer Joseph Ovila Pierrot Jetté, M.M.M., C.D.
- Chief Warrant Officer Robert Denis Joseph Lamothe, M.M.M., C.D.
- Chief Warrant Officer Joseph Lionel Pierre Leger, M.M.M., C.D.
- Chief Warrant Officer Dianne Maidment, M.M.M., C.D.
- Chief Warrant Officer Deborah Ann Matthews, M.M.M., C.D.
- Chief Warrant Officer Robert Claude McCann, M.M.M., C.D.
- Chief Warrant Officer Norman James McLanaghan, M.M.M., C.D.
- Chief Warrant Officer Bradley William John Montgomery, M.M.M., M.S.M., C.D.
- Chief Warrant Officer Joseph Jean-Pierre Morin, M.M.M., C.D.
- Chief Warrant Officer Daniel Thomas Moyer, M.M.M., C.D.
- Chief Warrant Officer Derek John Munroe, M.M.M., C.D.
- Chief Petty Officer 1st Class Barry Keith Petten, M.M.M., C.D.
- Chief Warrant Officer Ernest Gérard Joseph Poitras, M.M.M., C.D.
- Chief Warrant Officer William Alan Richards, M.M.M., M.S.M., C.D.
- Chief Warrant Officer Joseph Patrice Claude Rioux, M.M.M., C.D.
- Chief Warrant Officer Shawn Douglas Stevens, M.M.M., M.S.M., C.D.
- Chief Warrant Officer Joseph Raymond Guy St-Jean, M.M.M., C.D.
- Chief Warrant Officer Robert Michael Unger, M.M.M., C.D.
- Chief Warrant Officer Chadley James Allen Wagar, M.M.M., C.D.
- Chief Warrant Officer Christopher John Waugh, M.M.M., C.D.
- Chief Warrant Officer Kevin Charles West, M.M.M., C.D.
- Chief Petty Officer 1st Class Stephen Douglas Wood, M.M.M., C.D.
- Master Warrant Officer Jorg Karl-Albert Adler, M.M.M., C.D.
- Master Warrant Officer Trent Donald Doucette, M.M.M., C.D.
- Chief Petty Officer 2nd Class Harry Sui Ming Fong, M.M.M., C.D.
- Chief Petty Officer 2nd Class Michael Murray Garuk, M.M.M., C.D.
- Chief Petty Officer 2nd Class Janet Alexandra Graham-Smith, M.M.M., C.D.
- Master Warrant Officer Shane Gerald Holwell, M.M.M., C.D.
- Chief Petty Officer 2nd Class Christopher Peter Koblun, M.M.M., C.D.
- Master Warrant Officer Serge Laforge, M.M.M., C.D.
- Master Warrant Officer Joseph Roland Claude Lavoie, M.M.M., C.D.
- Master Warrant Officer Joseph Sylvain Alain Marcil, M.M.M., C.D.
- Master Warrant Officer Steven Vincent Merry, M.M.M., C.D.
- Master Warrant Officer Stephen George McNabb, M.M.M., C.D.
- Master Warrant Officer Keith Michael Olstad, M.M.M., C.D.
- Master Warrant Officer Paul Joseph Pinel, M.M.M., C.D.
- Chief Petty Officer 2nd Class Joseph Ovila Mario Richard, M.M.M., C.D.
- Master Warrant Officer Joseph Eugène Patrick Richer, M.M.M., C.D.
- Master Warrant Officer Joseph Marcel Claude Rodrigue, M.M.M., C.D.
- Master Warrant Officer Joseph Normand Éric Saint-Pierre, M.M.M., C.D.
- Master Warrant Officer Sandra Marie Cecile Spragg, M.M.M., C.D.
- Master Warrant Officer Marie Antonia Suzie Thibault, M.M.M., C.D.
- Master Warrant Officer Joseph Laurent Stéphane Vallée, M.M.M., C.D.
- Master Warrant Officer James Francis Warwick, M.M.M., C.D.
- Warrant Officer Barbara Joyce Bajema, M.M.M., C.D.
- Warrant Officer Patrick Roland Bowers, M.M.M., C.D.
- Warrant Officer Robert Joseph Clarke, M.M.M., C.D.
- Petty Officer 1st Class Ronald Keith Crawford, M.M.M., C.D.
- Warrant Officer Peter William Dingle, M.M.M., C.D.
- Warrant Officer Wayne Edward Lundrigan, M.M.M., C.D.
- Warrant Officer Deryk James McGougan, M.M.M., C.D.
- Warrant Officer Patricia Mears, M.M.M., C.D.
- Petty Officer 1st Class Derrick Paul Nearing, M.M.M., C.D.
- Warrant Officer Gordon Nichol, M.M.M., C.D.
- Petty Officer 1st Class Linda May Parrish, M.M.M., C.D.
- Petty Officer 1st Class David William Poole, M.M.M., M.S.M., C.D.
- Petty Officer 1st Class Dion Sandy Vagn Randell, M.M.M., C.D.
- Warrant Officer Joseph Jean Dominic Roux, M.M.M., C.D.
- Warrant Officer Cameron Webster Stevens, M.M.M., C.D.
- Warrant Officer Alfred Bervyl Williston, M.M.M., C.D.
- Warrant Officer Alan Wilson, M.M.M., C.D.
- Warrant Officer Joseph Émilien François Yargeau, M.M.M., C.D.
- Warrant Officer Troy Anthony Zuorro, M.M.M., C.D.
- Sergeant Jeanette Esther Botari, M.M.M., C.D.
- Petty Officer 2nd Class Yves François Clément, M.M.M., M.S.M., C.D.
- Sergeant Peter Moon, M.M.M., C.D. (Canadian Ranger)
- Sergeant Harold Smallbones, M.M.M., C.D.
- Sergeant Karen Bernice Squires, M.M.M., C.D.
- Corporal Glenn Joseph Gerald Gray, M.M.M., C.D.
- Warrant Officer Paul James Albertson, M.M.M., C.D.
- Chief Warrant Officer Peter Stephen Andrews, M.M.M., C.D.
- Major Kevin Andrew Barry, M.M.M., C.D.
- Petty Officer 1st Class Jean Georges Christian Bélanger, M.M.M., C.D.
- Master Corporal Pierre Bernier (Canadian Ranger), M.M.M.
- Chief Warrant Officer Joseph Michel Bezeau, M.M.M., C.D.
- Master Warrant Officer James Blackmore, M.M.M., C.D.
- Chief Petty Officer 1st Class Wallace Francis Brake, M.M.M., C.D.
- Chief Warrant Officer Joseph André Michael Brideau, M.M.M., C.D.
- Captain Joseph Jean-Claude Caron, M.M.M., C.D.
- Warrant Officer Patrice Pascal Chartrand, M.M.M., M.S.M., C.D.
- Chief Warrant Officer Joseph Bruno Martin Colbert, M.M.M., C.D.
- Master Warrant Officer Gerald Ross Colgan, M.M.M., C.D.
- Lieutenant(N) Robert John Cookson, M.M.M., C.D.
- Warrant Officer Susan Yvonne Coupal, M.M.M., C.D.
- Chief Warrant Officer William John Crabb, M.M.M., M.S.M., C.D.
- Chief Warrant Officer Gordon Crossley, M.M.M., C.D.
- Chief Warrant Officer Shawn Edwin Croucher, M.M.M., C.D.
- Captain Kirk Darch, M.M.M., C.D.
- Master Warrant Officer Mary Denise D'Astous, M.M.M., C.D.
- Chief Warrant Officer Joseph Maurice Stephan Despins, M.M.M., C.D.
- Chief Petty Officer 2nd Class James Thomas Dicks, M.M.M., C.D.
- Warrant Officer Jeffrey Frank Allan Dickson, M.M.M., C.D.
- Warrant Officer Joseph Daniel Stéphane Dionne, M.M.M., C.D.
- Master Warrant Officer Keith Wayne Dobbin, M.M.M., C.D.
- Chief Warrant Officer Wayne Thomas Duggan, M.M.M., C.D.
- Warrant Officer Joseph Claude François Dutil, M.M.M., C.D.
- Chief Petty Officer 2nd Class Barry James Eady, M.M.M., C.D.
- Chief Petty Officer 1st Class Duncan Christian John Elbourne, M.M.M., C.D.
- Chief Warrant Officer Darcy Shawn Elder, M.M.M., M.S.M., C.D.
- Master Warrant Officer Paul Elliott, M.M.M., C.D.
- Master Warrant Officer Stephen Darrell Ellis, M.M.M., C.D.
- Sergeant Michael Wade Escott, M.M.M., C.D.
- Warrant Officer Donald Bruce Farr, M.M.M., C.D.
- Master Warrant Officer Darryl Shane Foster, M.M.M., C.D.
- Master Warrant Officer Brian William Mark Gauthier, M.M.M., C.D.
- Master Warrant Officer William Brent Gittens, M.M.M., C.D.
- Warrant Officer Eric Richard Green, M.M.M., M.S.M., C.D.
- Master Warrant Officer John Arthur Hann, M.M.M., C.D.
- Sergeant Christopher Gerard Hanrahan, M.M.M., C.D.
- Captain Andrew Harrington, M.M.M., C.D.
- Master Warrant Officer Timothy Edmund Holland, M.M.M., C.D.
- Warrant Officer Curtis Russell Hollister, M.M.M., C.D.
- Chief Petty Officer 2nd Class Cameron Wilson Jones, M.M.M., C.D.
- Chief Petty Officer 2nd Class Todd Kelly, M.M.M., C.D.
- Captain Jennifer Rose Kennedy, M.M.M., C.D.
- Chief Warrant Officer René Kiens, M.M.M., M.S.M., C.D.
- Chief Petty Officer 1st Class Joseph Pierre Bertrand Lafontaine, M.M.M., C.D.
- Warrant Officer Eric John LeClair, M.M.M., C.D.
- Chief Warrant Officer Joseph Pierre Roger Lefebvre, M.M.M., C.D.
- Captain Marie Irène Micheline Leguerrier, M.M.M., C.D.
- Petty Officer 1st Class Christopher John Lewis, M.M.M., C.D.
- Chief Warrant Officer Joseph Stephen Madore, M.M.M., C.D.
- Chief Warrant Officer Joseph Mario Denis Mailloux, M.M.M., C.D.
- Sergeant Joël Denis Joseph Manaigre, M.M.M., C.D.
- Master Warrant Officer Nicolas John Manoukarakis, M.M.M., C.D.
- Chief Warrant Officer Joseph Claude Mario Martel, M.M.M., C.D.
- Chief Petty Officer 1st Class Marcel Arthur Maynard, M.M.M., M.S.M., C.D.
- Chief Petty Officer 2nd Class Leo McDonald, M.M.M., C.D.
- Chief Petty Officer 1st Class Geoffrey Ewart Mctigue, M.M.M., C.D.
- Chief Warrant Officer Joseph Julien André Moreau, M.M.M., M.S.M., C.D.
- Master Warrant Officer Francis Justin Morneau, M.M.M., C.D.
- Captain Garry Morphet, M.M.M., C.D.
- Chief Warrant Officer Sherman Norman Neil, M.M.M., C.D.
- Captain Jose Ramon Nunez, M.M.M., C.D.
- Warrant Officer Donald Bradley Olmstead, M.M.M., C.D.
- Chief Warrant Officer Marie Dorothée Paradis, M.M.M., C.D.
- Master Warrant Officer Jean-Claude Jean Parent, M.M.M., C.D.
- Petty Officer 2nd Class Alana Michelle Power, M.M.M., C.D.
- Chief Warrant Officer Allan Rishchynski, M.M.M., C.D.
- Captain Mark Douglas Rittwage, M.M.M., C.D.
- Chief Warrant Officer Joseph Normand Michel Rivard, M.M.M., C.D.
- Chief Warrant Officer Marie Alphonsine Marina Roberge, M.M.M., C.D.
- Chief Warrant Officer Joseph Claude Jacques Roy, M.M.M., C.D.
- Warrant Officer Marlene AnnMarie Shillingford, M.M.M., C.D.
- Master Warrant Officer Richard Stacey, M.M.M., S.M.V., C.D.
- Master Warrant Officer Michael Dennis Stein, M.M.M., C.D.
- Warrant Officer Joseph Joël Laurent Darcy St-Laurent, M.M.M., S.C., M.B., C.D.
- Master Warrant Officer Leigh Matthew Taylor, M.M.M., C.D.
- Warrant Officer Jody Dwayne Tower, M.M.M., C.D.
- Chief Warrant Officer Joseph Fernand Luc Tremblay, M.M.M., C.D.
- Chief Warrant Officer Joseph Raymond Mario Tremblay, M.M.M., C.D.
- Petty Officer 1st Class Joseph Rolland Jacques Yvan Pierre Tremblay, M.M.M., C.D.
- Major Elizabeth Ann van Oostrum, M.M.M., C.D.
- Master Warrant Officer Joseph François Vidal, M.M.M., C.D.

== Order of Merit of the Police Forces ==
=== Commander of the Order of Merit of the Police Forces ===
Undress ribbon of a Commander of the Order of Merit of the Police Forces

- Commissioner Christopher D. Lewis, C.O.M. - This is a promotion within the Order
- Chief Clive L. Weighill, C.O.M. - This is a promotion within the Order

=== Officers of the Order of Merit of the Police Forces ===
Undress ribbon of an Officer of the Order of Merit of the Police Forces

- Chief Keith J. Atkinson, O.O.M. - this is a promotion within the Order
- Deputy Commissioner Craig J. Callens, O.O.M.
- Chief Paul Douglas Cook, O.O.M. - this is a promotion within the Order
- Assistant Director Didier Deramond, O.O.M.
- Chief Bradley S. Duncan, O.O.M. - this is a promotion within the Order
- Chief Jennifer Evans, O.O.M.
- Inspector Michel Forget, O.O.M.
- Director General Anna Gray-Henschel, O.O.M.
- Chief Richard Hanson, O.O.M. - this is a promotion within the Order
- Director Mario Harel, O.O.M.
- Deputy Commissioner Peter Henschel, O.O.M.
- Chief Rod R. Knecht, O.O.M. - this is a promotion within the Order
- Assistant Commissioner Roman N. Lipinski, O.O.M.
- Sergeant Charles Andre Momy, O.O.M.
- Deputy Chief William Francis Moore, O.O.M.
- Director Shelagh Elizabeth Morris, O.O.M.
- Director Marc Parent, O.O.M. - this is a promotion within the Order
- Chief Daniel Colin Parkinson, O.O.M. - this is a promotion within the Order
- Chief Constable Robert A. Rich, O.O.M. - this is a promotion within the Order
- Deputy Director General Marcel Savard, O.O.M.
- Superintendent Donald J. J. Spicer, O.O.M. - this is a promotion within the Order
- Deputy Commissioner William Scott Tod, O.O.M.
- Staff Superintendent Jane Wilcox, O.O.M. - this is a promotion within the Order

=== Members of the Order of Merit of the Police Forces ===
Undress ribbon of a Member of the Order of Merit of the Police Forces

- Superintendent Brian Adams, M.O.M.
- Chief Superintendent Janice Rose Armstrong, M.O.M.
- Constable Michael Arruda, M.O.M.
- Director Sharon Baiden, M.O.M.
- Chief Superintendent Ricky W. Barnum, M.O.M.
- Assistant Commissioner Randall J. Beck, M.O.M.
- Chief Superintendent Donald William Bell, M.O.M.
- Sergeant Colin Evan Lamont Brown, M.O.M.
- Chief Superintendent Brian Cantera, M.O.M.
- Deputy Chief Thomas W. B. Carrique, M.O.M.
- Superintendent James William Carroll, M.O.M.
- Sergeant Michael Chicorelli, M.O.M.
- Inspector Brian F. Cookman, M.O.M.
- Sergeant George A. Couchie, M.O.M.
- Superintendent Susanne Decock, M.O.M.
- Assistant Commissioner François Deschênes, M.O.M.
- Chief John C. Domm, M.O.M.
- Sergeant Charles Dubois, M.O.M.
- Staff Sergeant Cameron E. Durham, M.O.M.
- Superintendent Selwyn John Fernandes, M.O.M.
- Inspector Gerard E. Francois, M.O.M.
- Staff Sergeant Pierre Gauthier, M.O.M.
- Superintendent Ronald Girling, M.O.M.
- Chief Superintendent James R. D. Gresham, M.O.M.
- Constable Evens Guercy, M.O.M.
- Chief John Peter Hagarty, M.O.M.
- Chief Constable Paul Hames, M.O.M.
- Sergeant Michael Hunter, M.O.M.
- Detective Sergeant Leonard Gordon Isnor, M.O.M.
- Chief Constable Dave Jones, M.O.M.
- Mr. François Landry, M.O.M.
- Deputy Commissioner James Douglas Lang, M.O.M.
- Inspector William James Law, M.O.M.
- Inspector Michael W. Leighton, M.O.M.
- Sergeant Marc Lépine, M.O.M.
- Chief Constable Peter A. Lepine, M.O.M.
- Superintendent Brenda M. Lucki, M.O.M.
- Superintendent Kenneth MacDonald, M.O.M.
- Chief Superintendent Craig Steven MacMillan, M.O.M.
- Inspector Dan Markiewich, M.O.M.
- Inspector Steven James Martin, M.O.M.
- Deputy Chief Robert D. Morin, M.O.M.
- Inspector Glen L. Motz, M.O.M.
- Chief Superintendent Joseph Adrian Oliver, M.O.M.
- Deputy Chief Robert Percy, M.O.M.
- Inspector Adua Porteous, M.O.M.
- Superintendent Paul Richards, M.O.M.
- Inspector Lise Roussel, M.O.M.
- Chief Alfred Rudd, M.O.M.
- Corporal Wayne L. Russett, M.O.M.
- Assistant Commissioner Marianne C. Ryan, M.O.M.
- Inspector Allan Godfrey Sauve, M.O.M.
- Superintendent Michael P. Shea, M.O.M.
- Provincial Commander Mary Silverthorn, M.O.M.
- Superintendent Eric Kenneth Slinn, M.O.M.
- Staff Sergeant Brian Snyder, M.O.M.
- Chief William B. Sornberger, M.O.M.
- Inspector Bob Stewart, M.O.M.
- Deputy Chief Stephen Streeter, M.O.M.
- Chaplain James E. Turner, M.O.M.
- Sergeant Detective Benoit Vigeant, M.O.M.
- Superintendent Christopher Mark Wyatt, M.O.M.
- Dr. Akira Brian Yamashita, M.O.M.

== Royal Victorian Order ==
Undress ribbon for all grades of the Royal Victorian Order

=== Member of the Royal Victorian Order ===
- Greg Peters

== Most Venerable Order of the Hospital of St. John of Jerusalem ==
Undress ribbon for all grades of the Most Venerable Order of the Hospital of St. John of Jerusalem

=== Knights and Dames of the Order of St. John ===
- His Honour, the Honourable H. Frank Lewis, O.P.E.I., Charlottetown, PEI
- Commander Sylvain Bissonnette, Laval, QC
- Robert Cade, C.D., Regina, SK
- Gilbert James Carter, Sussex, NB
- Her Honour, the Honourable Judith Isabel Guichon, O.B.C., Victoria, BC

=== Commanders of the Order of St. John ===
- Daniel Faucher, Repentigny, QC
- Marianne Rita Hagen, Timberlea, NS
- Commander (Retired) Robert Henry McIlwaine, C.D., Vancouver, BC
- Thomas Craig Wilson, Surrey, BC
- Commodore Hans Jung, O.M.M., C.D., Ottawa, ON
- Carmie McCormack, Georgetown, ON
- Keith Ernest Perron, Guelph, ON

=== Officers of the Order of St. John ===
- Constable Kirk Patrick Hughes, Deline, NT
- Kevin Robert Edward McCormick, Sudbury, ON
- Captain(N) (Retired) Normand Potvin, Courtenay, BC
- Mohammad Imran Shamsi, Port Coquitlam, BC
- André Fournier, Drummondville, QC
- Steven David Gaetz, Winnipeg, MB
- Major Carl Gauthier, M.M.M., C.D., Nepean, ON
- Dany Houde, Québec, QC
- Lieutenant(N) Jeffrey Lee, Richmond, BC
- Kellie Lee Mitchell, Yellowknife, NT
- John Nadeau, Whistler, BC
- Kathleen May Parker, Walkerton, ON
- James Patterson, Ottawa, ON
- Annie Pinard, Saint-Ambroise-de-Kildare, QC
- Lieutenant Eric Lorenzo Marcel Roy, C.D., Ottawa, ON
- Lieutenant-Colonel (Retired) Douglas Edward Slowski, C.D., Nanaimo, BC
- Julia Kristine Zoetewey, Vancouver, BC

=== Members of the Order of St. John ===
- Daniel Alexander Arbuckle, Ingersoll, ON
- Tina Basque, Port Perry, ON
- Robert Boily, Laval, QC
- Nancy Darlene Burrows, River Ryan, NS
- Josée Cadieux, Princeville, QC
- Dyane Cadoret, Québec, QC
- Samson Ka Yang Chan, Vancouver, BC
- Vincenzo Cicero, Acton, ON
- Bradley John Collyer, Peterborough, ON
- Wendy Lilian Downing, North York, ON
- Marilyn Marie Dwyer, Brantford, ON
- Donna Marie Flemming, Ketch Harbour, NS
- Captain David Jean-Baptiste Donat Moreau Fortin, Saint-Jacques-le-Mineur, QC
- Jimmie Leroy Francis, Burlington, ON
- Matthew Aaron Glover, Burlington, ON
- Colonel Hercule Gosselin, O.M.M., C.D., Montréal, QC
- Allan Graham, Oshawa, ON
- Christina Hong, Burnaby, BC
- Master Warrant Officer Henry Klausnitzer, C.D., London, ON
- Patty Wai Yin Lo, Thornhill, ON
- Mary Georgette Loblaw, Port Moody, BC
- Wendy Luong, Vancouver, BC
- Lloyd David McKnight, M.M.M., Chester Basin, NS
- Evan John Charles Mohns, Arnprior, ON
- Adrian Kar-Hao Ng, Vancouver, BC
- Sergeant Lawrence William O'Brien, C.D., Courtenay, BC
- Jonathan William Peppler, Elmwood, ON
- Master Warrant Officer Richard Louis Perreault, C.D., Smiths Falls, ON
- Shirley Ann Philpot, Kamloops, BC
- Marsha Elaine Seens, Ajax, ON
- Richard Vincent Teixeira, Markham, ON
- Lieutenant-Colonel Paul Bradford, LaSalle, ON
- Keith Gordon Brine, Winnipeg, MB
- Norma Alice Broadbear, Belleville, ON
- Master Corporal (Retired) Paul Joseph Currie, C.D., Fort Smith, NT
- Lori Elaine Dubinsky, Dugald, MB
- Her Honour Linda May Ethell, Edmonton, AB
- Leon Frederick Flannigan, Rivers, MB
- Robert Goneau, Rockland, ON
- Glen Currie Greenhill, Courtenay, BC
- Yves Harvey, Québec, QC
- Nancy Lynette Hollman, Belleville, ON
- Benjamin Kay Yip Kaan, Vancouver, BC
- Darrel Elbert Kennedy, Ottawa, ON
- Janie Margaret Law, Dugald, MB
- Heather Marie Gordon Leong, Cambridge, ON
- Jeffrey Lott, Nanaimo, BC
- Reverend Joseph Francis Malley, Miramichi, NB
- Lyndsay Alison McGregor, Hanover, ON
- Russell Dennis Newcombe, Pitt Meadows, BC
- David Robert Paradis, Barrie, ON
- David Christopher Rakobowchuk, Ottawa, ON
- Trent Alexander Ralston, Burlington, ON
- Lieutenant-Colonel (Retired) Henry Leslie Lawrence Simpson, C.D., Belleville, ON

== Provincial Honours ==
=== National Order of Québec ===
==== Grand Officers of the National Order of Québec ====
Undress ribbon for a Grand Officer of the National Order of Québec

- Michal Hornstein, G.O.Q.
- Bernard Lamarre, G.O.Q

==== Officers of the National Order of Québec ====
Undress ribbon for an Officer of the National Order of Québec

- Frederick Andermann, O.Q
- Marc-André Bédard, O.Q
- Claude Corbo, O.Q
- Hélène Desmarais, O.Q
- Michel Dumont, O.Q
- Monique F. Leroux, O.Q
- Monique Jérôme-Forget, O.Q
- Yves Martin, O.Q
- André Melançon, O.Q
- Eric Herbert Molson, O.Q
- Claude C. Roy, O.Q
- H. Arnold Steinberg, O.Q

==== Honorary Officer of the National Order of Québec ====
- Nana Mouskouri, O.Q

==== Knight of the National Order of Québec ====
Undress ribbon for a Knight of the National Order of Québec

- Luc Beauregard, C.Q
- Aldo Bensadoun, C.Q
- Claire Bolduc, C.Q
- Walter Boudreau, C.Q
- Nicole Brossard, C.Q
- Léa Cousineau, C.Q
- Lise Denis, C.Q
- Danielle Descent, C.Q
- Rose Dufour, C.Q
- Minnie Grey, C.Q
- Louise Lemieux Bérubé, C.Q
- Marie-Nicole Lemieux, C.Q
- René Malo, C.Q
- Hany Moustapha, C.Q
- Maurice Ptito, C.Q
- Michel Ringuet, C.Q
- René Rozon, C.Q
- Lamine Touré, C.Q
- Jean-Marie Tremblay, C.Q

=== Saskatchewan Order of Merit ===
Undress ribbon for a member of the Saskatchewan Order of Merit

- Dr. Richard B. Baltzan, O.C., S.O.M., F.R.C.P. (C)
- John V. Cross, C.M., S.O.M.
- May Henderson, S.O.M.
- Grant J. Kook, S.O.M., C.Dir.
- Dr. J.R. (Jim) Miller, O.C., S.O.M., F.R.S.C.
- Dr. George R. Reed, C.M., S.O.M., LL.D.
- Arthur Tsuneo Wakabayashi, C.M., S.O.M.

== Secret awards of Canadian Decorations ==
- 22 June 2013: His Excellency the Right Honourable David Johnston, Governor General and Commander-in-Chief of Canada, on the recommendation of the Chief of Defence Staff, has awarded two Stars of Military Valour, one Medal of Military Valour, one Meritorious Service Cross (Military Division), and one Meritorious Service Medal (Military Division) to members of the Canadian Special Operations Forces Command, and two Meritorious Service Medals (Military Division) to members of the Chief of Defence Intelligence for military activities of high standard that have brought great honour to the Canadian Armed Forces and to Canada. For security and operational reasons, recipients' names and citations have not been released.

== Canadian Bravery Decorations ==
=== Star of Courage ===
Undress ribbon for the Star of Courage

- Tianah Auger
- Asaf Shargall
- Nicole Louise Foran
- Stéphanie Labbé (posthumous)
- Constable Jeff Smiley
- Master Seaman Cecil Jason Sparkes

=== Medal of Bravery ===
Undress ribbon for the Medal of Bravery

- Francis Bédard
- Jean-François Bernier
- Andrew Lawrence Bertrend
- Dale Burton Bollivar
- Robert Borduas
- Sergeant Michael Brown
- Constable Brian Murray Carmichael
- Constable Solange Aurelle Phyllis Cormier
- Matthew Crombeen
- Sergeant Brian Robert Eadie
- Constable Jeremy James Falle
- Constable Neal Fowler
- Harry Malcolm Fraser
- Constable Charles Gagné
- Matthew Patrick Gallant
- Simon Glen Gallant
- Constable Charlie Gunner
- Constable Keith Carson Head
- Michael Henry
- Annie Mairin Caitlin Hutchison
- Sarah Beth Hutchison
- Sarah Ann John
- Susan John (posthumous)
- Sergeant Michael Hamilton Johnston, M.B. (This is a second award to the Medal of Bravery for Sergeant Johnston)
- Andreas Michael Jorgensen
- Constable Steve Kowan
- Constable Jérôme Labonté
- John Lamkey
- Kirk Laroque
- Danick Lévesque
- Jean-Claude Lindsay
- Daniel Gordon Livingston
- Laura Elizabeth MacDonald
- Craig MacInnes
- Jacques Marcoux
- Ian Frederick McBride
- John Frederick Meredith
- Constable Randal Douglas Metzler
- Michel Michaud
- Sergeant George Winton Matthew Myers
- Alexander L. Myros
- Paris Nicolaides
- Paul Alexander Oliver
- Lee Page
- Constable Roger Lee Paris
- Constable Philippe Pauzé
- Wayne David Pink
- Constable Glenn Joseph Pinto
- Constable Sylvain Proulx
- Constable Ken Ramsay, C.D.
- Nicholas Romain
- Constable Nicholas Joseph Roy, C.D.
- McCartney Sealey
- Damien Simard
- Constable Jason Spooner
- Constable Derek St-Cyr
- Patricia St. Denis
- Lenoard C. Taft
- Timothy Jordy Tait
- André Tremblay
- Constable Kathleen Tremblay
- Constable Stéphane Tremblay
- Constable Régis Voyer
- Kyle Walker
- Amanda Walkowiak
- Constable Toby Whinney
- Troy Alan Wilcox
- Sergeant Jeffery Paul Alderdice
- Benoit Bourbonnais
- Christopher Bugelli
- Bertrand Carle
- Sergeant Stéphane Lionel Clavette, C.D.
- Denise Marie Collins
- Sergeant Michael Edgar Cox, C.D.
- Bobbi-Jo Dalziel
- Kevin M. Daniels
- Constable Lane Ashley Douglas-Hunt
- Constable Dwight Doyle
- Shawn Alexander Doyle
- Melville E. Farnell
- André Fauchon
- Warnakulasuriya Raja Fernando
- Constable Warren Neil Fo Sing
- Marc-André Forgues
- Constable Joel Edward Fraser
- Constable Shawn Fraser
- Keith Glibbery
- Taylor John Gostick
- James Randall Haden
- RCMP Constable Deanna Theresa Hagen
- Daniel Henri
- Alden Yale Henry
- John Robert Jacques
- Philippe Jacques-Bélair
- Lieutenant-Colonel David D. Johnson
- Randy Johnson
- Sergeant John L. Jorginson
- Connor Frederick Klein
- Gregory John Kutney
- Constable Robert H. Labelle
- Cindy Levasseur
- Guy Liboiron
- Len MacIntyre
- Jean Marquis
- Francis J. Marshall
- Constable Samantha McInnis
- Steven Douglas McLavish
- Master Corporal Caleb W. McPhail, C.D.
- Brian Darrell McRae
- Jakob Merkel (posthumous)
- David Garnet Mills
- Marilyn Marion Mills
- Constable Michael Alexander Mulville
- Richard S. Munro
- Brock Elliott Nelson
- James Parker
- Samuel Rainville
- Leslie Dawn Rakow
- Alexander C. Robertson
- Gerard Denis Robineau
- Elijah Ashton Rumleski-Boisvert
- Carolina Aida Santizo Arriola
- Eunice Marie Selagi
- Constable John Shean
- Craig Alexander Sibley
- David W. Simpson
- Robert Spencer
- Joseph Sylvester
- Constable Jacques W. Thibeault
- Claude Veilleux
- Chief Warrant Officer William Thomas Walker, C.D.
- Brandon Wheeler
- Mayer Yacowar

== Meritorious Service Decorations ==
=== Meritorious Service Cross (Military Division) ===
Undress ribbon for Meritious Service Cross in the military division

- GENERAL JAMES MATTIS, M.S.C. (United States Marine Corps)
- LIEUTENANT-COLONEL BARRY MARSHALL SOUTHERN, M.S.C., M.S.M., C.D.
- MAJOR-GENERAL STUART BEARE, C.M.M., M.S.C., M.S.M., C.D.
- BRIGADIER-GENERAL MICHAEL DAY, O.M.M., M.S.C., C.D.
- MAJOR-GENERAL JAMES ROBERT FERRON, O.M.M., M.S.C., C.D.
- LIEUTENANT GENERAL JAMES TERRY, M.S.C. (United States Army)
- LIEUTENANT-GENERAL GUY ROBERT THIBAULT, C.M.M., M.S.C., C.D.

=== Meritorious Service Cross (Civil Division) ===
Undress ribbon for Meritious Service Cross in the civilian division

- COLONEL CHRIS AUSTIN HADFIELD, O.Ont., M.S.C., C.D. (Retired)

=== Meritorious Service Medal (Military Division) ===
Undress ribbon for the Meritious Service Medal in the military division

- PETTY OFFICER 1ST CLASS DANIEL JAMES MAURICE ASH, M.S.M., C.D.
- MAJOR DANIEL AUGER, M.S.M., C.D.
- SERGEANT JOSEPH CLAUDE PATRICK AUGER, M.S.M., C.D.
- CHIEF WARRANT OFFICER GÉRALD BLAIS, M.S.M., C.D.
- MAJOR PASCAL BLANCHETTE, M.S.M., C.D.
- LIEUTENANT-COLONEL KIRK DOUGLAS BLAND, M.S.M., C.D.
- LIEUTENANT-COLONEL SÉBASTIEN BOUCHARD, M.S.M., C.D.
- LIEUTENANT-COLONEL CHARLES DOUGLAS CLAGGETT, M.S.M., C.D.
- LIEUTENANT-COMMANDER MATTHEW DAVID COATES, M.S.M., C.D.
- LIEUTENANT-COLONEL DAVID BRUCE COCHRANE, M.S.M., C.D.
- COLONEL DAVID BRUCE COCHRANE, M.S.M., C.D.
- CHIEF WARRANT OFFICER DANIEL ALEXANDER DEBRIE, M.S.M., C.D.
- LIEUTENANT-COLONEL BRIAN CHARLES DERRY, M.S.M., C.D.
- LIEUTENANT-COLONEL MARTIN ANDREAS FRANK, M.S.M., C.D.
- LIEUTENANT(N) MELISSA HELEN FUDGE, M.S.M.
- MAJOR JOSEPH JEAN-LOUIS DENIS GENDRON, M.S.M., C.D.
- LIEUTENANT(N) JEAN-EUDES GENDRON, M.S.M., C.D.
- PETTY OFFICER 2ND CLASS PHILIP MURRAY GORMLEY, M.S.M., C.D.
- WARRANT OFFICER PAUL DERRICK GOULDING, M.S.M., C.D.
- LIEUTENANT-COLONEL ROBERT HARRISON, M.S.M., C.D.
- MAJOR GUY CHARLES INGRAM, M.S.M., C.D.
- COLONEL ERIC JEAN KENNY, M.S.M., C.D.
- CORPORAL ASHRAF KHALIL, M.S.M.
- COMMANDER STÉPHANE JOSEPH DOMINIQUE LAFOND, M.S.M., C.D.
- COLONEL ALEXANDER DONALD MEINZINGER, O.M.M., M.S.M., C.D.
- LIEUTENANT-COLONEL MARK MISENER, M.S.M., C.D.
- COMMANDER DEREK MOSS, M.S.M., C.D.
- LIEUTENANT-COLONEL JOHN PAGANINI, M.S.M. (United States Army)
- COLONEL MICHAEL MATTHEW LAWRENCE RAFTER, M.S.M., C.D.
- MAJOR JEFFREY ALAN RODGER, M.S.M., C.D.
- MAJOR HARJIT SAJJAN, M.S.M., C.D.
- COLONEL JAMES BAXTER SIMMS, O.M.M., M.S.M., C.D.
- COLONEL STEVEN JOSEPH RUSSELL WHELAN, M.S.M., C.D.
- MAJOR PIERRE FRANÇOIS NICOLAS BERTRAND, M.S.M., C.D.
- LIEUTENANT-COLONEL MAXIME TALBOT, M.S.M.
- LIEUTENANT-COLONEL SUZANNE MARIE BAILEY, M.S.M., C.D.
- CHIEF PETTY OFFICER 2ND CLASS CHRISTOPHER JAMES BLONDE, M.S.M., C.D.
- MAJOR JOSEPH ÉRIC STÉPHANE BRIAND, M.S.M., C.D
- CHIEF WARRANT OFFICER GORDEN ROY CAVANAGH, M.S.M., C.D.
- MAJOR DEREK JOHN CHENETTE, M.S.M., C.D.
- MAJOR ADAM RICHARD CYBANSKI, M.S.M., C.D.
- LIEUTENANT-COLONEL GUY DOIRON, M.S.M., C.D.
- PETTY OFFICER 2ND CLASS MICHÈLE DUMARESQ-OUELLET, M.S.M.
- HONORARY COLONEL DENNIS MICHAEL ERKER, M.S.M.
- HONORARY CAPTAIN(N) THE HONOURABLE MYRA AVA FREEMAN, C.M., O.N.S., M.S.M.
- CHIEF WARRANT OFFICER DAPHNE VIOLA GERMAIN, M.M.M., M.S.M., C.D.
- MAJOR JAY LYMAN INDEWEY, M.S.M., C.D.
- COLONEL DEREK WILLIAM JOYCE, O.M.M., M.S.M., C.D.
- WARRANT OFFICER ALLAN MARK KENDALL, M.S.M., C.D.
- MAJOR DENE LEONARD, M.S.M. (United States Army)
- LIEUTENANT-COLONEL YANNICK LEMIEUX, M.S.M., C.D.
- MAJOR JAY ADAM MACKEEN, M.S.M., C.D.
- MAJOR STEPHEN NOEL, M.S.M., C.D.
- COLONEL PAUL ORMSBY, O.M.M., M.S.M., C.D.
- COMMANDER BRADLEY ALAN PEATS, M.S.M., C.D.
- COLONEL JOSEPH PAUL ALAIN PELLETIER, M.S.M., C.D.
- MASTER WARRANT OFFICER ANTHONY CARL PETTIPAS, M.S.M., C.D.
- MASTER CORPORAL MONTGOMERY PATRICK ROBSON, M.S.M., C.D.
- LIEUTENANT-COLONEL DAVID DONALD ROSS, M.M.M., M.S.M., C.D.
- CHIEF WARRANT OFFICER CHRISTOPHER PAUL RUSK, M.M.M., M.S.M., C.D.
- MAJOR CAROL DIANE SAWATZKY, M.S.M., C.D.
- CHIEF PETTY OFFICER 1ST CLASS ALISTAIR SKINNER, M.S.M., C.D.
- COMMANDER CRAIG TROY SKJERPEN, M.S.M., C.D.
- CHIEF WARRANT OFFICER ANTHONY JAMES SLACK, M.M.M., M.S.M., C.D.
- WARRANT OFFICER GREGORY ALLAN SMIT, S.C., M.S.M., C.D.
- CHIEF PETTY OFFICER 1ST CLASS ROBERT STEPHEN SPINELLI, M.M.M., M.S.M., C.D.
- CAPTAIN(N) KENNETH ROBERT STEWART, M.S.M., C.D.

=== Erratum ===
- Correction from 8 December 2012: Meritorious Service Medal (Military Division) to COLONEL JOSEPH PIERRE HERVÉ HERCULE GOSSELIN, O.M.M., M.S.M., C.D.

== Commonwealth and Foreign Orders, Decorations and Medal awarded to Canadians ==
=== From Her Majesty The Queen in Right of Australia ===
==== National Emergency Medal ====
- Mr. Kelly Bedford

=== From Her Majesty The Queen in Right of Jamaica ===
==== Badge of Honour for Long and Faithful Service (Honorary Member) ====
- Mr. Hector Delanghe
- Mr. Ken Elgin Forth

=== From Her Majesty The Queen in Right of the United Kingdom ===
==== Commander of the Most Excellent Order of the British Empire ====
- Ms. Sherry Coutu
- Ms. Johanna Waterous

==== Member of the Most Excellent Order of the British Empire ====
- Ms. Kresse Wesling
- Ms. Frances Noronha

==== British Empire Medal ====
- Ms. Gloria Olga Crossley

==== Operational Service Medal with Afghanistan Clasp ====
- Major Joseph Ianic Nicolas Duval
- Captain Christopher Hogan
- Captain D. Jimmy Leclerc

=== From the President of the Islamic Republic of Afghanistan ===
==== Baryaal Darajaah Yak (Successfulness 1st Grade) Medal ====
- Major-General Donald M. Day

=== From Her Majesty The Queen of Denmark ===
==== Knight 1st Degree of the Dannebrog ====
- Mr. Peter Erik Lawrence Teed

=== From the President of Estonia ===
==== Order of Terra Mariana (3rd Class) ====
- The Honourable Robert Keith Rae

=== From the President of the Republic of Finland ===
==== Knight 1st Class of the Order of the White Rose of Finland ====
- Mr. Gerald Malcolm Lougheed Jr.

=== From the President of the French Republic ===
==== Officer of the National Order of the Legion of Honour ====
- Lieutenant-General Yvan Blondin
- Vice-Admiral Paul Andrew Maddison

==== Knight of the National Order of the Legion of Honour ====
- Mr. Jean-François Béland
- Mr. Bernard Bélanger
- Mr. Pierre L. Gauthier
- Ms. Linda Hasenfratz

==== Knight of the National Order of Merit of the Republic of France ====
- Mrs. Julie Snyder
- Colonel (Retired) Christian Rousseau
- Sister François Solano

==== Officer of the National Order of Merit of the Republic of France ====
- Ms. Suzanne Fortier

==== Knight of the National Order of Merit of the Republic of France ====
- The Honourable Jocelyne Bourgon

==== Officer of the Order of the Academic Palms ====
- Mr. Martin Bielz

==== Knight of the Order of the Academic Palms ====
- Mr. André Delisle
- Mrs. Lise Gaboury-Diallo
- Mr. Alain Goldschläger
- Mr. Denis Monière
- Mr. Kenneth Meadwell
- Mr. Maurice Periard
- Mr. François Roberge

==== Commander of the Order of Arts and Letters ====
- Mr. Jean-Louis Roy

==== Officer of the Order of Arts and Letters ====
- Mr. Michel Côté
- Mr. Edmond Elbaz
- Mr. Wadji Mouawad

==== Knight of the Order of Arts and Letters ====
- Ms. Tina Celestin
- Mr. Normand Charbonneau
- Mr. Francis Corpataux
- Mr. Daniel Gelinas
- Mr. Julien MacKay
- Ms. Janine Sutto
- Mr. Guy Delisle
- Ms. Loreena McKennitt

==== National Defence Medal, Gold Echelon with Gendarmerie Nationale Clasp ====
- Inspector Nadine Carmel-Tremblay
- Constable Michel Martel

==== National Defence Medal, Silver Echelon with Armée de Terre Clasp ====
- Captain Tom Foulds

==== National Defence Medal with Silver Echelon ====
- Lieutenant-Colonel Jean-François Bédard
- Major Michaël R. G. Godard
- Captain Marc-André La Haye

==== National Defence Medal, Bronze Echelon with "État-Major" Clasp ====
- Mr. Nicolas Morin Valcour

==== National Defence Medal, Bronze Echelon ====
- Major William Church

==== Knight of the Order of Agricultural Merit ====
- Professor Paul Paquin
- Me Ghislain K.-Laflamme

==== French Commemorative Medal with Afghanistan Clasp ====
- Mr. Zobair David Deen

=== From the President of the Federal Republic of Germany ===
==== Knight's Cross of the Order of Merit of the Federal Republic of Germany ====
- Mr. George Jiři Brady

=== From the President of Hungary ===
==== Commander's Cross of the Order of Merit of Hungary ====
- Mr. Szabolcs Magyarodi

==== Officer's Cross of the Order of Merit of Hungary ====
- Mr. Miklos Mezes
- Mr. Janos Miska

==== Gold Cross of Merit of Hungary ====
- Mr. Zoltan Veres
- Mr. Tibor Abraham
- Ms. Susan Margaret Papp-Aykler

=== From the President of the Republic of Italy ===
==== Knight of the National Order of Merit of the Republic of Italy ====
- Mr. Carman Anthony Giacomantonio
- Mr. John Osborne
- Ms. Josephine Palumbo
- Mr. Italo Spagnuolo
- Ms. Alda Venditti Viero

==== Knight of the Order of the Star of the Republic of Italy ====
- Mr. Antonio Caruso
- Mr. Michel Gagnon
- Ms. Maria Giardini

=== From His Majesty The Emperor of Japan ===
==== Order of the Rising Sun, Silver Rays ====
- Mr. Shinichiro (James) Matsumoto

=== From the President of the Republic of Korea ===
==== Order of Merit for Diplomatic Service ====
- Mr. Barry Devolin

==== Order of Civil Merit, Moran Medal (2nd Class) ====
- Mr. Dominic Barton

==== Civil Merit Medal ====
- Mr. James McCormack

=== From the President of the Republic of Moldova ===
==== Civil Merit Medal ====
- The Honourable Corneliu Chisu

=== From His Majesty The King of the Netherlands ===
==== Commemorative Medal for Peacekeeping Operations with ISAF Clasp ====
- Captain Adam K. Guibat

=== From the Secretary of the North Atlantic Treaty Organization ===
==== NATO Meritorious Service Medal ====
- Lieutenant-General Charles Bouchard
- Major Brian Erickson
- Major Michael Van Marum
- Lieutenant-Colonel Larry Weir

=== From the President of the Republic of Poland ===
==== Commander's Cross of the Order of Merit of the Republic of Poland ====
- General (Retired) Walter J. Natynczyk

==== Officer's Cross of the Order of Merit of the Republic of Poland ====
- Mrs. Longina Dimant
- Ms. Janina Muszyńska

==== Knight's Cross of the Order of Merit of the Republic of Poland ====
- Mrs. Urszula Sulinska
- Mr. Krzysztof Kasprzyk
- Mrs. Maria Karulis

==== Officer's Cross of the Order of Polonia Restituta ====
- Mrs. Zofia Lewicka-Pezowicz

==== Cross of Freedom and Solidarity of the Republic of Poland ====
- Mr. Piotr Jakubiak
- Mr. Mariusz Labentowicz
- Mr. Ladyslaw Piotrowski
- to Mr. Kazimierz Pater
- Mr. Grzegorz Staszewski

==== Gold Cross of Merit of the Republic of Poland ====
- Mr. Shimon Fogel
- Mr. Michal Kuleczka
- Mr. Bogdan Labecki
- Mrs. Kinga Mitrowska-Kowalska
- Mrs. Agata Pilitowska
- Ms. Maria Dukowski
- Ms. Róża Granek
- Ms. Maria Michalik
- Mr. Stanislaw Jaworski

==== Silver Cross of Merit of the Republic of Poland ====
- Ms. Ewa Anna Karpinska
- Mr. Richard Marceau
- Ms. Marie-Christine Palczak
- Ms. Ewa Wiklik

==== Bronze Cross of Merit of the Republic of Poland ====
- Mr. Tomasz Trembowski

==== Long Term Marriage Relationship Medal ====
- Mrs. Iwona Brzeska
- Mr. Stanislaw Brzeski

=== From the President of the United States of America ===
==== Commander of the Legion of Merit ====
- Vice-Admiral Paul Andrew Maddison, CMM MSM CD

==== Officer of the Legion of Merit ====
- Brigadier-General Robert J. Chekan
- Major-General Donald M. Day
- Lieutenant-General Thomas James Lawson
- Colonel Michel Duhamel
- Colonel Christian G. Juneau
- Captain(N) Richard Bergeron
- Brigadier-General J. Y. R. André Viens

==== Legion of Merit (Degree of Legionnaire) ====
- Chief Warrant Officer Mark L. Baisley

==== Bronze Star Medal ====
- Major Eghtedar Manouchehri
- Brigadier-General Karl D. McQuillan
- Lieutenant-Colonel Douglas Clark
- Major William Church

==== Meritorious Service Medal with First Oak Leaf Cluster ====
- Colonel Sylvain Bédard
- Major Michael L. Evans

==== Meritorious Service Medal ====
- Captain Jean-François Latreille
- Major Leonard M. Wappler
- Major James Armstrong
- Major Jean P. Dorris
- Lieutenant-Colonel Donald B. McKinnon
- Major Marco E. Vunak
- Major Luc Hamel
- Major Adam M. McCabe
- Lieutenant-Colonel Michael G. Hogan
- Lieutenant-Colonel Arnold Herbert Kettenacker
- Chief Warrant Officer Christopher Paul Rusk
- Major Patrick Granholm
- Major Michael L. Evans
- Lieutenant-Colonel Casey W. McLean
- Major John T. Williams
- Lieutenant-Commander Brenton H. Baxter
- Major Stephen F. Gallagher
- Major John Harris
- Major Earl J. Maher
- Major Conrad E. Bourgeois
- Captain Nasser El-Beltagy
- Lieutenant-Colonel Kevin B. Ferdinand
- Major John K. Vintar
- Major Stephen Harvie
- Major Daniel R. Hilliker
- Lieutenant-Colonel Christopher Lawrence Swallow

==== Air Medal, First Oak Leaf Cluster ====
- Captain Shawn Guilbault
- Major Richard A. Jolette

==== Air Medal, Second Strike/Flight Award ====
- Captain Jared O. Penney

==== Air Medal ====
- Captain Shawn A. Guilbault
- Master Corporal Carrie A. Clifford
- Captain Erik N. Rozema-Seaton
- Master Corporal Jonathan P. Peters
- Captain Karen Baker
- Sergeant Grant T. Krygsveld

== Erratums of Commonwealth and Foreign Orders, Decorations and Medal awarded to Canadians ==
=== Corrections of 23 February 2013 ===
- The notice published on page 96 of the January 26, 2013, issue of the Canada Gazette, Part I, is hereby amended as follows: From the President of the Republic of Poland, the Silver Cross of Merit of the Republic of Poland to Mr. Richard Marceau.
