= Senator Percy =

Senator Percy may refer to:

- Charles H. Percy (1919–2011), U.S Senator from Illinois from 1967 to 1985.
- LeRoy Percy, (1860–1929), U.S. Senator from Mississippi from 1910 to 1913
- Percy Downe (born 1954), Canadian senator from 2003
