= Wybrow =

Wybrow is a surname. Notable people with the surname include:

- Beverley Wybrow, Canadian women's rights activist
- Christopher Wybrow (born 1961), Australian water polo player
- John Wybrow (1928–2019), New Zealand politician and diplomat
- William Wybrow (1805–1897), English cricketer

== See also ==
- Whybrow
