= Eddie Goldenberg =

Canadian political advisor (1948–2026)

Eddie Goldenberg CM
- Goldenberg in 2006

9th Chief of Staff to the Prime Minister
- In office 2003
- Prime Minister: Jean Chrétien
- Preceded by: Percy Downe
- Succeeded by: Tim Murphy

Personal details
- Born: Edward Goldenberg; July 31, 1948 Montreal, Quebec, Canada
- Died: July 9, 2026 (aged 77) Ottawa, Ontario, Canada
- Party: Liberal Party of Canada
- Relations: Carl Goldenberg (father)
- Education: McGill University
- Profession: Lawyer

Edward Goldenberg CM (July 31, 1948 – July 9, 2026), was a Canadian lawyer and writer who served as a senior advisor to Canadian Prime Minister Jean Chrétien for decades. Described as Chrétien's "Machiavelli", from 1993 until 2003 he was chief policy advisor to the Prime Minister, becoming chief of staff in 2003. Along with Jean Pelletier and Aline Chrétien, he was considered Chrétien's most influential political guide. Goldenberg's 2006 memoir, The Way It Works, focused on his time in government. He was the son of the Canadian Senator and lawyer H. Carl Goldenberg.

== Career ==
Goldenberg first worked for politician Jean Chrétien in 1972 with a summer internship after completing his first year at McGill University Faculty of Law. From 1980 to 1982, he supported Chrétien as Special Constitutional Advisor to the Minister of Justice and was one of the authors of the Charter of Rights and Freedoms.

In 1990, Goldenberg was "co-ordinating the 10 policy groups that have been organized to brief Chrétien on various issues and to write speeches." He worked with Paul Martin, Terrie O'Leary, and Chaviva Hosek "on finalizing the text of the famous Red Book, officially titled Creating Opportunity: The Liberal Plan for Canada."

From 1993 until 2003 he was Chrétien's aide and chief policy advisor. He was involved with the government when the Kyoto Protocol was signed in 1998 and then signed again in 2002, and later wrote on the matter. He became the Prime Minister's Chief of Staff in 2003.

After Chretien left office, Goldenberg became a partner at the Ottawa office of law firm Stikeman Elliott LLP and subsequently a senior partner at Bennett Jones LLP, leading the firm's government affairs and public policy practice. He was a supporter of Bob Rae's bid to become Liberal leader in 2006. In 2019, he was still working with Jean Chretien on diplomatic matters with the People's Republic of China.

=== Goldenberg's The Way It Works book ===
Goldenberg was the author of The Way It Works, a book about his experiences working with Chrétien. It focuses especially on 1993 until 2003 during Goldenberg's time as Senior Policy Advisor to Chrétien.

Goldenberg's 2006 memoir, The Way It Works, was called by Maclean's "a bluntly realistic endorsement of the Savoie-Simpson thesis with none of the handwringing." The memoir also covers Goldenberg's recollections of the writing process for 'the Red Book, which set the Liberal platform for the 1993 federal election. In 2006, it was a finalist for the Shaughnessy Cohen Award for Political Writing.

== Death ==
Goldenberg died of cancer in Ottawa, on July 9, 2026, at the age of 77.

== Honours ==
Goldenberg was appointed a Member of the Order of Canada (CM) in the 2013 Canadian honours for "his contributions to public policy in Canada and for his championing of innovation and research excellence." He was also awarded the King Charles III Coronation Medal in 2023.

== Publishing history ==
- Author of The Way It Works (September 18, 2007, ISBN 9780771035623)

== Archives ==
There is an Edward S. Goldenberg fonds at Library and Archives Canada.

Political offices
Preceded by Percy Downe	Chief of Staff of the Prime Minister's Office; 2003	Succeeded by Tim Murphy
