= Whybrow =

Whybrow is a surname. Notable people with the surname include:

- Arthur Whybrow (1923–2009), British actor
- Ian Whybrow (born 1941), English writer
- Peter C. Whybrow (1939–2025), English psychiatrist and writer

== See also ==
- Wybrow
