= Harold Kalant =

Canadian pharmacologist and physician (1923–2021)

Harold Kalant CC
- Born: November 15, 1923; Toronto, Ontario, Canada
- Died: July 6, 2021 (aged 97); Toronto, Ontario, Canada
- Education: University of Toronto
- Occupation: Physician

Harold Kalant CC (November 15, 1923 – July 6, 2021) was a Canadian pharmacologist and physician specializing in research in drug addiction. He made contributions to research on the effect of alcohol and psychoactive drugs on the human body. He was a professor emeritus of the University of Toronto.

Kalant died on July 6, 2021.

== Most cited papers ==
- Eckardt MJ, File SE, Gessa GL, Grant KA, Guerri C, Hoffman PL, Kalant H, Koob GF, Li TK, Tabakoff B. Effects of moderate alcohol consumption on the central nervous system. Alcoholism: Clinical and Experimental Research. 1998 Aug;22(5):998-1040. According to Google Scholar, it has been cited 742 times.
- Kalant, Harold. "The pharmacology and toxicology of “ecstasy”(MDMA) and related drugs." CMAJ (Canadian Medical Association Journal)165, no. 7 (2001): 917-928 According to Google Scholar, this article has been cited 728 times
- Kalant H. Adverse effects of cannabis on health: an update of the literature since 1996. Progress in Neuro-Psychopharmacology & Biological Psychiatry. 2004 Aug 1;28(5):849-63. According to Google Scholar, this article has been cited 417 times
- Hawkins RD, Kalant H. The metabolism of ethanol and its metabolic effects. Pharmacological Reviews. 1972 Mar 1;24(1):67-157. According to Google Scholar, this article has been cited 409 times
- Kalant H, Kalant OJ. Death in amphetamine users: causes and rates. Canadian Medical Association Journal. 1975 Feb 8;112(3):299. According to Google Scholar, this article has been cited 232 times
- Kalant H. Medicinal use of cannabis: history and current status. Pain Research & Management. 2001 Jan 1;6(2):80-91. According to Google Scholar, this article has been cited 211 times
- Kalant H. What neurobiology cannot tell us about addiction. Addiction. 2010 May;105(5):780-9. According to Google Scholar, this article has been cited 158 times
- Kalant H. Opium revisited: a brief review of its nature, composition, non‐medical use and relative risks 1. Addiction. 1997 Mar;92(3):267-77. According to Google Scholar, this article has been cited 124 times
