= Camille Limoges =

- Born: May 31, 1942 (age 82); Montreal, Quebec, Canada
- Occupation(s): Former deputy minister, civil servant, historian

Camille Limoges (born 31 May 1942, in Montreal) is the former deputy minister of the Ministry of Higher Education, Research, Science and Technology in Quebec, Canada.

Limoges founded the Institut d'histoire et de sociopolitique des sciences at the Université de Montréal in 1973. Ten years later, he became the deputy minister of Quebec's newly created ministère de l'Enseignement supérieur et de la Science.

Returning to academia in 1987, this time to the Université du Québec à Montréal, Limoges joined a multi-university team to create the Centre de recherche en évaluation sociale des technologies. Thereafter, he went on to found and serve as director of the Centre interuniversitaire de recherche sur la science et la technologie. He also served from 1989 to 1990 as president of ACFAS (Association canadienne-française pour l'avancement des sciences). In 1997, he became president of the Conseil de la science et de la technologie (CST). The Government of Quebec integrated a number of proposals developed by the CST into its policy on science and technology, announced in January 2000.

Limoges received his PhD from the Sorbonne in 1968, studying under Georges Canguilhem. One of his most influential students is historian of biology Jan Sapp.

Limoges was appointed a member of the Order of Canada on 16 November 2010, but he resigned from the Order on 26 January 2013, for personal reasons.
