= John H. McArthur =

American business academic

John Hector McArthur
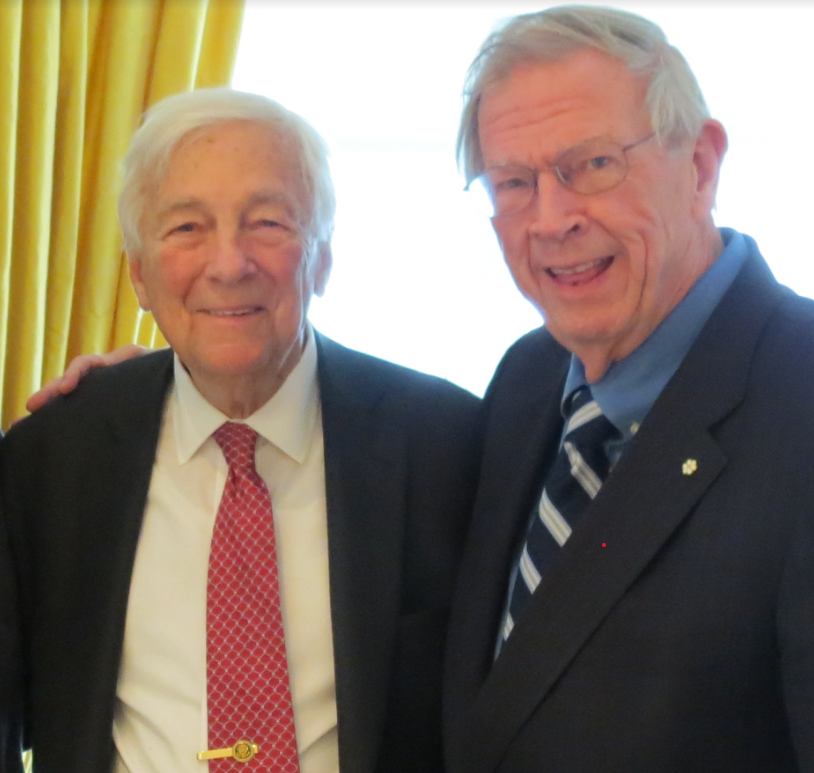
- McArthur (right) and John C. Whitehead (left) in 2014
- Born: March 31, 1934; Vancouver, British Columbia, Canada
- Died: August 20, 2019 (aged 85); Boston, Massachusetts, U.S.
- Education: University of British Columbia; Harvard Business School
- Occupations: Professor emeritus Administrator
- Spouse: Natty Ewasiuk
- Children: 2

John Hector McArthur (March 31, 1934 – August 20, 2019) was a Canadian-American organizational theorist. He served as Professor of Business Administration and the 7th Dean of the Harvard Business School (1980–1995).

== Personal life ==
McArthur was born on March 31, 1934, in Vancouver, McArthur grew up in nearby Burnaby, British Columbia. His father was a government grain inspector and his mother was a nurse. He graduated from Burnaby South High School, attended the University of British Columbia and earned a Bachelor of Commerce degree in Forestry in 1957. He earned MBA and doctorate (DBA) degrees from the Harvard Business School in 1959 and 1963, respectively.

McArthur died on August 20, 2019, at the age of 85.

== Professional career ==
McArthur started his academic career as faculty member of the Harvard Business School in 1962. In 1973, he became Professor of Financial Management, and in 1980 Professor of Business Administration. From 1980 through 1995, he served as seventh dean of the Harvard Business School. During his tenure, the Business School fundamentally redesigned its programs and campus which were highlighted in a Business Week cover story and The Harvard Crimson. According to a review of Thomas K. McCraw, Jeffrey L. Cruikshank's book The Intellectual Venture Capitalist: John H. McArthur and the Work of the Harvard Business School, 1980-1995, McArthur's trademark was "his commitment to creating a collaborative community.". From 1995 to 2005, McArthur was also Senior Advisor to the President of The World Bank.

McArthur also served as the founding Co-Chair of Partners HealthCare after his successful effort to unite two prominent Harvard University Teaching Hospitals: Brigham and Women's and Massachusetts General Hospital. McArthur had previously served as Chair of the Board for the Brigham and Women's Hospital. He had served on numerous boards and as Chair of the Asia Pacific Foundation of Canada, based in Vancouver, British Columbia. He also served as a key member on the Canadian Advisory Board for the Harvard Business School since it was founded in the early 1990s. McArthur was Co-Chair of the Venly Institute.

== Recognition and awards ==
In 2015, McArthur was named Officer of the Order of Canada "[f]or his accomplishments as a leader in business education and for his ongoing engagement as an advisor in Canada's public and private sectors". In 2016, he received The Harvard Medal for distinguished service to the university.

The John H. McArthur Canadian Fellowship was established in 1998 at the Harvard Business School. The Fellowship is named in honor of the former dean, who is a British Columbia native, and is funded by the generous support of Canadian alumni.

== Publications ==
Books:

- 1969. Industrial Planning in France. With Bruce R. Scott. Boston: Harvard Business School, Division of Research,
