= Progress in Neuro-Psychopharmacology & Biological Psychiatry =

- Discipline: Neuropsychopharmacology, biological psychiatry
- Language: English
- Edited by: Louis Gendron

Publication details
- Former name(s): Progress in Neuro-Psychopharmacology
- History: 1977-present
- Publisher: Elsevier
- Frequency: 8/year
- Impact factor: 5.6 (2022)

Standard abbreviations
- ISO 4: Prog. Neuro-Psychopharmacol. Biol. Psychiatry

Indexing
- CODEN: PNPPD7
- ISSN: 0278-5846 (print); 1878-4216 (web)
- OCLC no.: 848644184

Links
- Journal homepage; Online archive

Progress in Neuro-Psychopharmacology & Biological Psychiatry is a peer-reviewed academic journal publishing review articles and original research reports pertaining to neuropsychopharmacology and biological psychiatry.

== Background ==
The journal was established in 1977 as Progress in Neuro-Psychopharmacology, obtaining its current name in 1982. It is published eight times per year by Elsevier. The editor-in-chief is Louis Gendron (Université de Sherbrooke). According to the Journal Citation Reports, the journal has a 2022 impact factor of 5.6.
