= L. Jacques Ménard =

Canadian businessman (1946–2020)

L. Jacques Ménard CC, OQ, GOQ, LLD
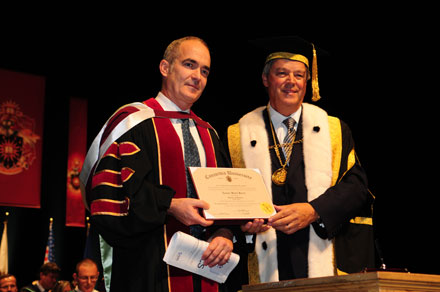
- L. Jacques Ménard (right)
- Born: January 29, 1946; Chicoutimi, Quebec, Canada
- Died: February 4, 2020 (aged 74); Montreal, Quebec, Canada
- Known for: Chancellor of Concordia University

Louis-Jacques Ménard, CC GOQ COM (January 29, 1946 – February 4, 2020) was President Emeritus of BMO Financial Group, Quebec. Prior to this appointment, Mr. Ménard held the position of President Quebec, BMO Financial Group and oversaw the activities of Bank of Montreal and its subsidiaries in Quebec. He also acted as the Chairman of BMO Nesbitt Burns. (January 29, 1946 – February 4, 2020) was the chancellor of Concordia University from 2011 to 2014.

== Biography ==
Ménard was a companion in the Order of Canada and an officer in the Order of Quebec. He was president of BMO Financial group, Quebec; chairman of BMO Nesbitt Burns; Ménard was also chairman of Hydro-Québec, the Investment Dealers Association of Canada and the Task Force on the Sustainability of the Quebec Health Care and Social Services System.

He received Concordia University’s Loyola Medal in 1999 and an honorary doctorate in 2006. He died in Montreal after a long illness on February 4, 2020.

In 2009-2010, he served as Vice-Chair of the Federal Task Force on Financial Literacy, and in 2013 he initiated a major study, in conjunction with The Boston Consulting Group, "Building a New Momentum in Montreal" and a subsequent program "I see mtl" aimed at revitalizing Montreal.

== Books published ==
- Si on s’y mettait... ISBN 9782894723654 (2008)
- Beyond the Numbers... a Matter of the Heart
- Réussir: Aller au bout de ses rêves ISBN 9782896493494 (2011)
