= Chief of Defence Intelligence (Canada) =

The Chief of Defence Intelligence (CDI); French: Chef du Renseignement de la Défense, (CRD) was a Canadian intelligence agency, part of a broader Canadian security and intelligence community that comprises several departments and agencies that collect and analyze intelligence on issues of concern to Canada and also manages DND/CF national/international intelligence partnerships.

In addition to providing support to military operations, CDI provides the community with unique capabilities and expertise: strategic threats to Canada and allied governments, indications and warning intelligence on international political and military activities, strategic and crisis coverage of regional security developments that may affect Canadian security interests or engage Canadian forces, and scientific and technical intelligence with a defence or security focus. CDI supports broader intelligence community collection, analysis and reporting on asymmetric threats, terrorism and international criminal activity.

CDI was renamed Canadian Forces Intelligence Command in 2013 and it is equivalent to: the Defense Intelligence Agency of the US, Defence Intelligence of the UK and Defence Intelligence Organisation of Australia.

== Mission ==
CDI was formed in 2004 and its mission was to provide credible, reliable and sustained intelligence services to Department of National Defense (DND) and the Canadian Forces (CF) in support of decision making and military operations; to support other government departments in the defence and security of Canada; and to build relationships and work with allies in support of mutual defense and security issues.

== Organisation ==
CDI, as an organization, was established in November 2004, by a joint decision of the Deputy Minister (DM) and the Chief of the Defence Staff (CDS), to meet the heightened demand for defence intelligence and in response to recommendations made in the DIR. The CDI became the functional authority within DND/CF for the defence intelligence function and the central source of defence intelligence policy/programme direction.

The CDI organization is the home to an 800-person highly integrated workforce employed in Canada and around the world. As the functional authority within DND/CF, the CDI is responsible for common policy, oversight, doctrine and procedures for a much broader Defence Intelligence function. Including the CDI organization, the Defence Intelligence function consists of 2 500 individuals from over a dozen military and civilian classifications.
