= Percy Downe =

Canadian politician (born 1954)

The Honourable Percy Downe
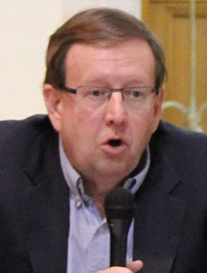
- Downe in 2013

Canadian Senator from Prince Edward Island
- Incumbent
- Assumed office June 26, 2003
- Nominated by: Jean Chrétien
- Appointed by: Adrienne Clarkson

8th Chief of Staff to the Prime Minister
- In office May 2, 2001 – June 26, 2003
- Prime Minister: Jean Chrétien
- Preceded by: Jean Pelletier
- Succeeded by: Eddie Goldenberg

Personal details
- Born: July 8, 1954 (age 72) Charlottetown, Prince Edward Island, Canada
- Party: Canadian Senators Group (2019–present)
- Other political affiliations: Progressive Senate Group (2019–2019); Independent Liberal (2014–2019); Liberal (until 2014)
- Education: University of Prince Edward Island (BA)

Military service
- Allegiance: Canada
- Branch/service: Force Mobile Command
- Years of service: 1970–1972
- Unit: The Prince Edward Island Regiment (RCAC)

Percy E. Downe (born July 8, 1954) is a Canadian politician and former politician aide. On the recommendation of Prime Minister Jean Chrétien, Downe was appointed to the Senate of Canada by Governor General Adrienne Clarkson on June 26, 2003.

== Career ==
Since graduating from the University of Prince Edward Island in 1977, Downe has served at the provincial and federal levels of government in Canada. Downe moved to Ottawa following the Liberal victory in the 1993 federal election, and served as executive assistant to the Secretary of State for Veterans Affairs. He subsequently served as executive assistant to the Minister of Fisheries and Oceans, and then the Minister of Labour.

He joined the Prime Minister's Office as director of appointments in 1998. He became Prime Minister Jean Chrétien's chief of staff in 2001. He was appointed to the Senate of Canada on June 26, 2003.

Downe is currently Vice-Chair of the Senate Standing Committee on Foreign Affairs and International Trade, Joint-Chair of the Standing Joint Committee on the Library of Parliament, a member of the Senate Standing Committee on Internal Economy, Budgets and Administration, and is also on the Executive Committee of the Canada-Europe Parliamentary Association.

He was also formerly a member of the Senate Standing Committee on National Finance, the Senate Standing Committee on Legal and Constitutional Affairs and the Senate Standing Committee on Rules, Rights and Procedures of Parliament.

Downe is also currently Vice-Chair of The Parliamentary Network on the World Bank & International Monetary Fund.

On January 29, 2014, Liberal Party leader Justin Trudeau announced all Liberal Senators, including Downe, were removed from the Liberal caucus, and would continue sitting as independents. Those Senators created the Senate Liberal Caucus, distinct from the Liberal caucus in the House of Commons.

With the Senate Liberal Caucus facing losing official parliamentary caucus status in 2020 with a third of its caucus facing mandatory retirements on their turning age 75, Senator Joseph Day announced that the Senate Liberal Caucus had been dissolved and a new Progressive Senate Group formed in its wake, with the entire membership joining the new group, including this senator. However, on November 18, 2019, Downe announced he was joining the Canadian Senators Group. He was deputy chair of the Canadian Senate Standing Committee on Rules, Procedures and the Rights of Parliament in the 45th Canadian Parliament.

== Personal life ==
He resides in Charlottetown with his wife and two daughters.

Political offices
| Preceded by Jean Pelletier | Chief of Staff of the Prime Minister's Office; 2001–2003 | Succeeded by Eddie Goldenberg |
