= Beverley Wybrow =

Canadian women's rights activist

Beverley Wybrow CM is a Canadian women's rights activist. She established the Assaulted Women's Helpline in Toronto and was president and CEO of the Canadian Women's Foundation (CWF).

== Biography ==
Wybrow studied at York University in Toronto, graduating in 1971.

In 1985, Wybrow established the Assaulted Women's Helpline in Toronto, the first telephone crisis service of its kind in Ontario. From 1991, Wybrow was president and CEO of the Canadian Women's Foundation (CWF). She retired in 2013.

Wybrow was appointed as a Member of the Order of Canada in 2013.
